= 2020 WTA 125K series =

Details
- Duration: 27 January – 20 December
- Edition: 9th
- Tournaments: 3

Achievements (singles)

The WTA 125K series is the secondary professional tennis circuit organised by the Women's Tennis Association. The 2020 WTA 125K series calendar consists of only three tournaments, shortened from the original schedule of fourteen tournaments due to the COVID-19 pandemic.

== Schedule ==
Week of	Tournament	Champions	Runners-up	Semifinalists	Quarterfinalists
January 27	Oracle Challenger Series – Newport Beach; Newport Beach, United States; Hard – $162,480 – 48S/4Q/16D; Singles – Doubles	(United States) Madison Brengle; 6–1, 3–6, 6–2	(Switzerland) Stefanie Vögele	(Argentina) Nadia Podoroska (United States) Taylor Townsend	(United States) Jessica Pegula (Germany) Tatjana Maria (United States) Christina McHale (United States) CoCo Vandeweghe
January 27	Oracle Challenger Series – Newport Beach; Newport Beach, United States; Hard – $162,480 – 48S/4Q/16D; Singles – Doubles	(United States) Hayley Carter (Brazil) Luisa Stefani; 6–1, 6–3	(Belgium) Marie Benoît (France) Jessika Ponchet	(Argentina) Nadia Podoroska (United States) Taylor Townsend	(United States) Jessica Pegula (Germany) Tatjana Maria (United States) Christina McHale (United States) CoCo Vandeweghe
March 2	Oracle Challenger Series – Indian Wells; Indian Wells, United States; Hard – $162,480 – 48S/4Q/16D; Singles – Doubles	(Romania) Irina-Camelia Begu; 6–3, 6–3	(Japan) Misaki Doi	(Russia) Vera Zvonareva (Ukraine) Lesia Tsurenko	(Germany) Laura Siegemund (Belgium) Yanina Wickmayer (United States) Jessica Pegula (Serbia) Olga Danilović
March 2	Oracle Challenger Series – Indian Wells; Indian Wells, United States; Hard – $162,480 – 48S/4Q/16D; Singles – Doubles	(United States) Asia Muhammad (United States) Taylor Townsend; 6–4, 6–4	(United States) Caty McNally (United States) Jessica Pegula	(Russia) Vera Zvonareva (Ukraine) Lesia Tsurenko	(Germany) Laura Siegemund (Belgium) Yanina Wickmayer (United States) Jessica Pegula (Serbia) Olga Danilović
August 31	Prague Open; Prague, Czech Republic; Clay – $3,125,000 – 128S/32D; Singles – Doubles	(Slovakia) Kristína Kučová; 6–4, 6–3	(Italy) Elisabetta Cocciaretto	(Serbia) Ivana Jorović (Argentina) Nadia Podoroska	(United Kingdom) Francesca Jones (Turkey) Çağla Büyükakçay (Russia) Marina Melnikova (Slovakia) Anna Karolína Schmiedlová
August 31	Prague Open; Prague, Czech Republic; Clay – $3,125,000 – 128S/32D; Singles – Doubles	(Belarus) Lidziya Marozava (Romania) Andreea Mitu; 6–4, 6–4	(Italy) Giulia Gatto-Monticone (Argentina) Nadia Podoroska	(Serbia) Ivana Jorović (Argentina) Nadia Podoroska	(United Kingdom) Francesca Jones (Turkey) Çağla Büyükakçay (Russia) Marina Melnikova (Slovakia) Anna Karolína Schmiedlová

=== Canceled and postponed without new date in 2020 ===
Original Week of	Tournament
March 16	Abierto Zapopan; Guadalajara, Mexico; Hard – $125,000 – 32S/8Q/16D
April 13	Xi'an Open; Xi'an, China; Hard – $125,000 – 32S/16Q/16D
April 27	Kunming Open; Anning, China; Clay – $125,000 – 32S/16Q/16D
June 1	Bol Open; Bol, Croatia; Clay – $125,000 – 32S/16D
July 6	Swedish Open; Båstad, Sweden; Clay – $125,000 – 32S/16D
July 27	Oracle Challenger Series – New Haven; New Haven, United States; Hard – $162,480 – 48S/4Q/16D
July 27	Karlsruhe Open; Karlsruhe, Germany; Clay – $125,000 – 32S/6Q/8D
August 29	Carinthian Ladies Open; Portschach, Austria; Hard – $1,575,000 – 64S/16D
September 7	Warsaw Open; Warsaw, Poland; Hard – $125,000 – 32S/6Q/8D
September 28	Tashkent Open; Tashkent, Uzbekistan; Hard – $125,000 – 32S/6Q/8D
October 5	OEC Taipei WTA Challenger; Taipei, Taiwan; Carpet (i) – $125,000 – 32S/16Q/16D
November 16	Oracle Challenger Series – Houston; Houston, United States; Hard – $162,480 – 48S/4Q/16D
December 14	Open de Limoges; Limoges, France; Hard (i) – $125,000 – 32S/8Q/8D

== Statistical information ==
These tables present the number of singles (S) and doubles (D) titles won by each player and each nation during the season. The players/nations are sorted by: 1) total number of titles (a doubles title won by two players representing the same nation counts as only one win for the nation); 2) a singles > doubles hierarchy; 3) alphabetical order (by family names for players).

To avoid confusion and double counting, these tables should be updated only after an event is completed.

=== Titles won by player ===
Total	Player	S	D	S	D
1	Irina-Camelia Begu (ROU)	●		1	0
1	Madison Brengle (USA)	●		1	0
1	Kristína Kučová (SVK)	●		1	0
1	Hayley Carter (USA)		●	0	1
1	Lidziya Marozava (BLR)		●	0	1
1	Andreea Mitu (ROU)		●	0	1
1	Asia Muhammad (USA)		●	0	1
1	Luisa Stefani (BRA)		●	0	1
1	Taylor Townsend (USA)		●	0	1

=== Titles won by nation ===
Total	Nation	S	D
3	United States (USA)	1	2
2	Romania (ROU)	1	1
1	Slovakia (SVK)	1	0
1	Belarus (BLR)	0	1
1	Brazil (BRA)	0	1

== Points distribution ==
Event	W	F	SF	QF	R16	R32	R64	R128	Q	Q2	Q1
Singles (128S)	160	95	75	57	40	30	20	2	—		
Singles (48S)	160	95	57	29	15	8	1	—	4	—	1
Singles (32S)	160	95	57	29	15	1	—		6	4	1
Doubles (32D)	160	95	75	57	40	2	—				
Doubles (16D)	160	95	57	29	1	—					
Doubles (8D)	160	95	57	1	—						

== See also ==
- 2020 WTA Tour
- 2020 ITF Women's World Tennis Tour
- 2020 ATP Challenger Tour
