= 2019 Oracle Challenger Series – Newport Beach =

- Date: January 21–27
- Edition: 2nd
- Category: ATP Challenger Tour; WTA 125K series
- Draw: 48S / 16D
- Prize money: $162,480+H (ATP) $162,480 (WTA)
- Surface: Hard, outdoor
- Location: Newport Beach, United States
- Venue: Newport Beach Tennis Club

Champions

Men's singles
- (United States) Taylor Fritz

Women's singles
- (Canada) Bianca Andreescu

Men's doubles
- (United States) Robert Galloway / (United States) Nathaniel Lammons

Women's doubles
- (United States) Hayley Carter / (United States) Ena Shibahara
← 2018 ·	Oracle Challenger Series – Newport Beach	· 2020 →

The 2019 Oracle Challenger Series – Newport Beach was a professional tennis tournament played on outdoor hard courts. It was the second edition of the tournament, which is part of the 2019 ATP Challenger Tour and the 2019 WTA 125K series. It took place from January 21–27, 2019 in Newport Beach, United States.

== Point distribution ==
Event	W	F	SF	QF	Round of 16	Round of 32	Round of 48	Q	Q1
Men's singles	125	75	45	25	10	5	0	0	0
Men's doubles	125	75	45	25	0	—	—	—	—
Women's singles	160	95	57	29	15	8	1	4	1
Women's doubles	160	95	57	29	1	—	—	—	—

== Men's singles main-draw entrants ==
=== Seeds ===
Country	Player	Rank^{1}	Seed
USA	Taylor Fritz	50	1
~~USA~~	~~Bradley Klahn~~	~~78~~	~~2~~
USA	Mackenzie McDonald	81	3
ITA	Paolo Lorenzi	116	4
CAN	Peter Polansky	118	5
TPE	Jason Jung	120	6
SRB	Miomir Kecmanović	125	7
USA	Bjorn Fratangelo	133	8
USA	Noah Rubin	140	9
GER	Dominik Köpfer	160	10
USA	Christopher Eubanks	170	11
BAR	Darian King	171	12
ECU	Roberto Quiroz	181	13
USA	Ernesto Escobedo	190	14
~~USA~~	~~Tommy Paul~~	~~194~~	~~15~~
CAN	Brayden Schnur	196	16

- ^{1} Rankings are as of 14 January 2019.

=== Other entrants ===
The following players received wildcards into the singles main draw:

- (United States) Ulises Blanch
- (United States) Taylor Fritz
- (United States) Marcos Giron
- (United States) Patrick Kypson
- (United States) Roy Smith

The following player received entry into the singles main draw as an alternate:

- (United States) Collin Altamirano

The following players received entry from the qualifying draw:

- (United States) Maxime Cressy
- (United States) Evan Song

The following player received entry as a lucky loser:

- (United States) Alafia Ayeni

== Women's singles main-draw entrants ==
=== Seeds ===
Country	Player	Rank^{1}	Seed
SWE	Rebecca Peterson	64	1
GER	Tatjana Maria	74	2
CAN	Eugenie Bouchard	79	3
USA	Madison Brengle	88	4
USA	Taylor Townsend	93	5
CAN	Bianca Andreescu	106	6
USA	Jessica Pegula	113	7
RUS	Sofya Zhuk	119	8
CZE	Marie Bouzková	121	9
USA	Sachia Vickery	123	10
BEL	Yanina Wickmayer	126	11
USA	Nicole Gibbs	127	12
JPN	Misaki Doi	133	13
USA	Claire Liu	138	14
USA	Varvara Lepchenko	140	15
SUI	Jil Teichmann	148	16

- ^{1} Rankings are as of 14 January 2019.

=== Other entrants ===
The following players received wildcards into the singles main draw:

- (United States) Hanna Chang
- (United States) Haley Giavara
- (United States) Elizabeth Halbauer
- (United States) Maegan Manasse

The following players received entry from the qualifying draw:

- (Mexico) Giuliana Olmos
- (United States) Katie Volynets

=== Withdrawals ===
Before the tournament

- (United States) Sofia Kenin → replaced by (Poland) Urszula Radwańska
- (Slovakia) Kristína Kučová → replaced by (Germany) Lena Rüffer
- (Slovakia) Anna Karolína Schmiedlová → replaced by (Japan) Mari Osaka
- (United States) CoCo Vandeweghe → replaced by (United States) Kayla Day

== Women's doubles main-draw entrants ==
=== Seeds ===
Country	Player	Country	Player	Rank^{1}	Seed
CHI	Alexa Guarachi	MEX	Giuliana Olmos	156	1
USA	Sabrina Santamaria	RUS	Valeria Savinykh	193	2
USA	Taylor Townsend	BEL	Yanina Wickmayer	283	3
KAZ	Anna Danilina	USA	Ingrid Neel	297	4

- ^{1} Rankings as of 14 January 2019

=== Other entrants ===
The following pair received wildcard into the doubles main draw:

- (United States) Gail Brodsky / (United States) Francesca Di Lorenzo

== Champions ==
=== Men's singles ===
- (United States) Taylor Fritz def. (Canada) Brayden Schnur, 7–6^{(9–7)}, 6–4

=== Women's singles ===
- (Canada) Bianca Andreescu def. (United States) Jessica Pegula 0–6, 6–4, 6–2

=== Men's doubles ===
- (United States) Robert Galloway / (United States) Nathaniel Lammons def. (Monaco) Romain Arneodo / (Belarus) Andrei Vasilevski 7–5, 7–6^{(7–1)}

=== Women's doubles ===
- (United States) Hayley Carter / (United States) Ena Shibahara def. (United States) Taylor Townsend / (Belgium) Yanina Wickmayer, 6–3, 7–6^{(7–1)}
