= 2019 Oracle Challenger Series – Newport Beach – Women's doubles =

Tennis event

Newport Beach – Women's doubles
- 2019 Oracle Challenger Series – Newport Beach

Final
- Champions: (United States) Hayley Carter (United States) Ena Shibahara
- Runners-up: (United States) Taylor Townsend (Belgium) Yanina Wickmayer
- Score: 6–3, 7–6^{(7–1)}

Events
Singles	men	women
Doubles	men	women
← 2018 ·	Oracle Challenger Series – Newport Beach	· 2020 →

Misaki Doi and Jil Teichmann were the defending champions, but Doi chose not to participate. Teichmann played alongside Madison Brengle, but they lost in the first round to Quinn Gleason and Luisa Stefani.

Hayley Carter and Ena Shibahara won the title, defeating Taylor Townsend and Yanina Wickmayer in the final, 6–3, 7–6^{(7–1)}.

== Seeds ==
1. (Chile) Alexa Guarachi / (Mexico) Giuliana Olmos (semifinals)
2. (United States) Sabrina Santamaria / (Russia) Valeria Savinykh (quarterfinals)
3. (United States) Taylor Townsend / (Belgium) Yanina Wickmayer (final)
4. (Kazakhstan) Anna Danilina / (United States) Ingrid Neel (first round)

== Draw ==
=== Key ===
- Q = Qualifier
- WC = Wild card
- LL = Lucky loser
- Alt = Alternate
- SE = Special exempt
- PR = Protected ranking
- ITF = ITF entry
- JE = Junior exempt
- w/o = Walkover
- r = Retired
- d = Defaulted
- SR = Special ranking

=== Draw ===
First round
1	(Chile) A Guarachi (Mexico) G Olmos	7	7
(Italy) G Marchetti (Mexico) R Zarazúa	5	5
(United States) M Manasse (United States) J Pegula	7^{7}	6
(United States) K Ahn (New Zealand) E Routliffe	6^{0}	1
3	(United States) T Townsend (Belgium) Y Wickmayer	4	7	[10]
(United States) J Loeb (Sweden) R Peterson	6	5	[3]
(United States) Q Gleason (Brazil) L Stefani	6	6
(United States) M Brengle (Switzerland) J Teichmann	4	4
(United States) C McHale (Netherlands) R van der Hoek	4	2
(United States) J Cako (United States) L Davis	6	6
WC	(United States) G Brodsky (United States) F Di Lorenzo	6	4	[10]
4	(Kazakhstan) A Danilina (United States) I Neel	3	6	[8]
(United States) H Carter (United States) E Shibahara	6	6
(United States) N Gibbs (United States) V Lepchenko	4	0
(United States) S Marand (United Kingdom) E Webley-Smith	4	6^{7}
2	(United States) S Santamaria (Russia) V Savinykh	6	7^{9}

Quarterfinals
1	(Chile) A Guarachi (Mexico) G Olmos	3	6	[10]
(United States) M Manasse (United States) J Pegula	6	4	[8]
3	(United States) T Townsend (Belgium) Y Wickmayer	6	6
(United States) Q Gleason (Brazil) L Stefani	4	4
(United States) J Cako (United States) L Davis	7^{7}	6
WC	(United States) G Brodsky (United States) F Di Lorenzo	6^{3}	3
(United States) H Carter (United States) E Shibahara	6	6
2	(United States) S Santamaria (Russia) V Savinykh	4	4

Semifinals
1	(Chile) A Guarachi (Mexico) G Olmos	4	5
3	(United States) T Townsend (Belgium) Y Wickmayer	6	7
(United States) J Cako (United States) L Davis	4	6^{2}
(United States) H Carter (United States) E Shibahara	6	7^{7}

Final
3	(United States) T Townsend (Belgium) Y Wickmayer	3	6^{1}
(United States) H Carter (United States) E Shibahara	6	7^{7}
