= 2019 Oracle Challenger Series – Newport Beach – Men's doubles =

Newport Beach – Men's doubles
- 2019 Oracle Challenger Series – Newport Beach

Final
- Champions: (United States) Robert Galloway (United States) Nathaniel Lammons
- Runners-up: (Monaco) Romain Arneodo (Belarus) Andrei Vasilevski
- Score: 7–5, 7–6^{(7–1)}

Events
Singles	men	women
Doubles	men	women
- Oracle Challenger Series – Newport Beach

James Cerretani and Leander Paes were the defending champions but only Cerretani chose to defend his title, partnering Marcelo Arévalo. Cerretani lost in the quarterfinals to Miomir Kecmanović and Darian King.

Robert Galloway and Nathaniel Lammons won the title after defeating Romain Arneodo and Andrei Vasilevski 7–5, 7–6^{(7–1)} in the final.

== Seeds ==
1. (El Salvador) Marcelo Arévalo / (United States) James Cerretani (quarterfinals)
2. (United States) Nicholas Monroe / (Mexico) Miguel Ángel Reyes-Varela (first round)
3. (Monaco) Romain Arneodo / (Belarus) Andrei Vasilevski (final)
4. (United States) Robert Galloway / (United States) Nathaniel Lammons (champions)

== Draw ==
Key

- Q = Qualifier
- WC = Wild card
- LL = Lucky loser
- Alt = Alternate
- ITF = ITF entry
- PR = Protected ranking
- SR = Special ranking
- SE = Special exempt
- JE = Junior exempt
- JR = Junior Accelerator Programme entrant
- CO = College Accelerator Programme entrant
- NG = Next Gen Accelerator Program entrant
- w/o = Walkover
- r = Retired
- d = Defaulted

First round
1	(El Salvador) M Arévalo (United States) J Cerretani	6	6
(United States) T Fritz (United States) M McDonald	4	4
(Serbia) M Kecmanović (Barbados) D King	1	6	[10]
WC	(United States) U Blanch (United States) Mi Redlicki	6	4	[7]
3	(Monaco) R Arneodo (Belarus) A Vasilevski	6	2	[10]
(United States) A Lawson (Canada) P Polansky	1	6	[5]
(India) S Balaji (Chinese Taipei) J Jung	6	6
WC	(United States) T-S Kwiatkowski (United States) N Rubin	3	2
(Portugal) G Oliveira (Italy) A Vavassori	3	3
(Ecuador) G Escobar (Venezuela) R Maytín	6	6
(Philippines) R Gonzales (United States) N Pasha	4	2
4	(United States) R Galloway (United States) N Lammons	6	6
WC	(United States) JC Aragone (United States) M Giron	6	6
(Italy) P Lorenzi (Venezuela) LD Martínez	3	3
(United States) E King (United States) H Reese	2	7^{7}	[10]
2	(United States) N Monroe (Mexico) MÁ Reyes-Varela	6	6^{4}	[4]

Quarterfinals
1	(El Salvador) M Arévalo (United States) J Cerretani	3	4
(Serbia) M Kecmanović (Barbados) D King	6	6
3	(Monaco) R Arneodo (Belarus) A Vasilevski	7^{7}	6
(India) S Balaji (Chinese Taipei) J Jung	6^{4}	3
(Ecuador) G Escobar (Venezuela) R Maytín	6^{5}	6^{5}
4	(United States) R Galloway (United States) N Lammons	7^{7}	7^{7}
WC	(United States) JC Aragone (United States) M Giron	6^{2}	6	[8]
(United States) E King (United States) H Reese	7^{7}	4	[10]

Semifinals
(Serbia) M Kecmanović (Barbados) D King	1	3
3	(Monaco) R Arneodo (Belarus) A Vasilevski	6	6
4	(United States) R Galloway (United States) N Lammons	7^{7}	4	[10]
(United States) E King (United States) H Reese	6^{4}	6	[7]

Final
3	(Monaco) R Arneodo (Belarus) A Vasilevski	5	6^{1}
4	(United States) R Galloway (United States) N Lammons	7	7^{7}
