= 2019 Oracle Challenger Series – Newport Beach – Women's singles =

Newport Beach – Women's singles
- 2019 Oracle Challenger Series – Newport Beach

Final
- Champion: (Canada) Bianca Andreescu
- Runner-up: (United States) Jessica Pegula
- Score: 0–6, 6–4, 6–2

Events
| Singles | men | women |
| Doubles | men | women |
| ← 2018 · | Oracle Challenger Series – Newport Beach | · 2020 → |

Danielle Collins was the defending champion, but chose not to participate as she was still competing at the Australian Open.

Bianca Andreescu won her first WTA 125K series title, defeating Jessica Pegula in the final, 0–6, 6–4, 6–2.

== Seeds ==
All seeds received a bye into the second round.

1. (Sweden) Rebecca Peterson (quarterfinals)
2. (Germany) Tatjana Maria (semifinals)
3. (Canada) Eugenie Bouchard (quarterfinals)
4. (United States) Madison Brengle (second round)
5. (United States) Taylor Townsend (quarterfinals)
6. (Canada) Bianca Andreescu (champion)
7. (United States) Jessica Pegula (final)
8. (Russia) Sofya Zhuk (second round)
9. (Czech Republic) Marie Bouzková (third round)
10. (United States) Sachia Vickery (second round, retired)
11. (Belgium) Yanina Wickmayer (second round)
12. (United States) Nicole Gibbs (quarterfinals)
13. (Japan) Misaki Doi (second round)
14. (United States) Claire Liu (third round)
15. (United States) Varvara Lepchenko (second round)
16. (Switzerland) Jil Teichmann (third round)

== Draw ==
=== Key ===
- Q = Qualifier
- WC = Wild card
- LL = Lucky loser
- Alt = Alternate
- ITF = ITF entry
- PR = Protected ranking
- SR = Special ranking
- SE = Special exempt
- JE = Junior exempt
- JR = Junior Accelerator Programme entrant
- CO = College Accelerator Programme entrant
- NG = Next Gen Accelerator Program entrant
- w/o = Walkover
- r = Retired
- d = Defaulted

=== Finals ===
Quarterfinals
1 | (Sweden) Rebecca Peterson | 3 | 3
7 | (United States) Jessica Pegula | 6 | 6
(United States) Lauren Davis | 6 | 3 | 7^{8}
5 | (United States) Taylor Townsend | 3 | 6 | 6^{6}
6 | (Canada) Bianca Andreescu | 6 | 6
3 | (Canada) Eugenie Bouchard | 2 | 0
12 | (United States) Nicole Gibbs | 1 | 3
2 | (Germany) Tatjana Maria | 6 | 6

Semifinals
7 | (United States) Jessica Pegula | 6 | 6
(United States) Lauren Davis | 3 | 4
6 | (Canada) Bianca Andreescu | 5 | 7 | 7^{7}
2 | (Germany) Tatjana Maria | 7 | 5 | 6^{3}

Final
7 | (United States) Jessica Pegula | 6 | 4 | 2
6 | (Canada) Bianca Andreescu | 0 | 6 | 6

=== Top half ===
==== Section 1 ====
First round
(United States) K Ahn | 6 | 6
(Poland) U Radwańska | 4 | 2
Alt | (Kazakhstan) A Danilina | 4 | 4
(Japan) M Hibi | 6 | 6
(United States) G Brodsky | 7 | 2 | 1
(United States) A Kiick | 5 | 6 | 6
(United States) F Di Lorenzo | 6 | 6
(China) Jia Lu | 3 | 4

Second round
1 | (Sweden) R Peterson | 6 | 6
(United States) K Ahn | 4 | 4
(Japan) M Hibi | 2 | 1
14 | (United States) C Liu | 6 | 6
11 | (Belgium) Y Wickmayer | 2 | 2
(United States) A Kiick | 6 | 6
(United States) F Di Lorenzo | 1 | 2
7 | (United States) J Pegula | 6 | 6

Third round
1 | (Sweden) R Peterson | 7^{7} | 7^{7}
14 | (United States) C Liu | 6^{0} | 6^{2}
(United States) A Kiick | 5 | 3
7 | (United States) J Pegula | 7 | 6

Quarterfinals
1 | (Sweden) R Peterson | 3 | 3
7 | (United States) J Pegula | 6 | 6

==== Section 2 ====
First round
(Canada) R Marino | 4 | 4
(Mexico) R Zarazúa | 6 | 6
(Bulgaria) S Karatantcheva | 2 | 5
(United States) L Davis | 6 | 7
(France) H Tan | 6 | 6
(Germany) K Gerlach | 4 | 2
(Germany) L Rüffer | 6 | 5 | 5
WC | (United States) H Chang | 2 | 7 | 7

Second round
4 | (United States) M Brengle | 6 | 4 | 2
(Mexico) R Zarazúa | 2 | 6 | 6
(United States) L Davis | 6 | 6
15 | (United States) V Lepchenko | 1 | 4
10 | (United States) S Vickery | 4 | 2^{r}
(France) H Tan | 6 | 4
WC | (United States) H Chang | 3 | 4
5 | (United States) T Townsend | 6 | 6

Third round
(Mexico) R Zarazúa | 2 | 6^{5}
(United States) L Davis | 6 | 7^{7}
(France) H Tan | 3 | 1
5 | (United States) T Townsend | 6 | 6

Quarterfinals
(United States) L Davis | 6 | 3 | 7^{8}
5 | (United States) T Townsend | 3 | 6 | 6^{6}

=== Bottom half ===
==== Section 3 ====
First round
(Japan) M Osaka | 0 | 0
Q | (United States) K Volynets | 6 | 6
(United States) J Loeb | 3 | 3
(Australia) O Rogowska | 6 | 6
(Serbia) J Jakšić | 6 | 5 | 6
WC | (United States) E Halbauer | 4 | 7 | 4
(United States) D Lao | 0 | 2
(United States) K Day | 6 | 6

Second round
6 | (Canada) B Andreescu | 6 | 7^{9}
Q | (United States) K Volynets | 2 | 6^{7}
(Australia) O Rogowska | 3 | 7^{7} | 6^{6}
9 | (Czech Republic) M Bouzková | 6 | 6^{5} | 7^{8}
16 | (Switzerland) J Teichmann | 6 | 7^{7}
(Serbia) J Jakšić | 3 | 6^{2}
(United States) K Day | 6 | 3 | 2
3 | (Canada) E Bouchard | 2 | 6 | 6

Third round
6 | (Canada) B Andreescu | 6 | 6
9 | (Czech Republic) M Bouzková | 1 | 2
16 | (Switzerland) J Teichmann | 2 | 2
3 | (Canada) E Bouchard | 6 | 6

Quarterfinals
6 | (Canada) B Andreescu | 6 | 6
3 | (Canada) E Bouchard | 2 | 0

==== Section 4 ====
First round
(Canada) K Sebov | 6 | 6
WC | (United States) H Giavara | 2 | 4
Q | (Mexico) G Olmos | 6 | 6
(Russia) V Savinykh | 1 | 1
(United States) C McHale | 6 | 6
(United States) R Anderson | 2 | 0
WC | (United States) M Manasse | 2 | 2
(Paraguay) V Cepede Royg | 6 | 6

Second round
8 | (Russia) S Zhuk | 2 | 3
(Canada) K Sebov | 6 | 6
Q | (Mexico) G Olmos | 6^{2} | 1
12 | (United States) N Gibbs | 7^{7} | 6
13 | (Japan) M Doi | 4 | 7 | 3
(United States) C McHale | 6 | 5 | 6
(Paraguay) V Cepede Royg | 6^{0} | 4
2 | (Germany) T Maria | 7^{7} | 6

Third round
(Canada) K Sebov | 1 | 2
12 | (United States) N Gibbs | 6 | 6
(United States) C McHale | 2 | 3
2 | (Germany) T Maria | 6 | 6

Quarterfinals
12 | (United States) N Gibbs | 1 | 3
2 | (Germany) T Maria | 6 | 6

== Qualifying ==
=== Seeds ===
1. (Mexico) Giuliana Olmos (qualified)
2. (Chile) Alexa Guarachi (qualifying competition)

=== Qualifiers ===
1. (Mexico) Giuliana Olmos
2. (United States) Katie Volynets

=== Qualifying draw ===
==== First qualifier ====
| Qualifying competition |
| 1 | (Mexico) Giuliana Olmos | 7 | 2 | 6 |
| WC | (Canada) Carson Branstine | 5 | 6 | 3 |

==== Second qualifier ====
| Qualifying competition |
| 2 | (Chile) Alexa Guarachi | 6 | 4 | 3 |
| WC | (United States) Katie Volynets | 4 | 6 | 6 |
