= 2019 Oracle Challenger Series – Newport Beach – Men's singles =

Newport Beach – Men's singles
- 2019 Oracle Challenger Series – Newport Beach

Final
- Champion: (United States) Taylor Fritz
- Runner-up: (Canada) Brayden Schnur
- Score: 7–6^{(9–7)}, 6–4

Events
Singles	men	women
Doubles	men	women
- Oracle Challenger Series – Newport Beach

Taylor Fritz was the defending champion and successfully retained his title after defeating Brayden Schnur 7–6^{(9–7)}, 6–4 in the final.

== Seeds ==
All seeds receive a bye into the second round.

1. (United States) Taylor Fritz (champion)
2. (United States) Bradley Klahn (withdrew)
3. (United States) Mackenzie McDonald (third round)
4. (Italy) Paolo Lorenzi (second round)
5. (Canada) Peter Polansky (second round)
6. (Chinese Taipei) Jason Jung (quarterfinals)
7. (Serbia) Miomir Kecmanović (quarterfinals)
8. (United States) Bjorn Fratangelo (second round)
9. (United States) Noah Rubin (second round)
10. (Germany) Dominik Köpfer (second round)
11. (United States) Christopher Eubanks (second round)
12. (Barbados) Darian King (quarterfinals)
13. (Ecuador) Roberto Quiroz (third round)
14. (United States) Ernesto Escobedo (second round)
15. (United States) Tommy Paul (withdrew)
16. (Canada) Brayden Schnur (final)

== Draw ==
Key

- Q = Qualifier
- WC = Wild card
- LL = Lucky loser
- Alt = Alternate
- ITF = ITF entry
- PR = Protected ranking
- SR = Special ranking
- SE = Special exempt
- JE = Junior exempt
- JR = Junior Accelerator Programme entrant
- CO = College Accelerator Programme entrant
- NG = Next Gen Accelerator Program entrant
- w/o = Walkover
- r = Retired
- d = Defaulted

=== Finals ===
Quarterfinals
1/WC	(United States) Taylor Fritz	2	6	6
7	(Serbia) Miomir Kecmanović	6	4	3
(France) Enzo Couacaud	6	3	7^{7}
12	(Barbados) Darian King	3	6	6^{0}
6	(Chinese Taipei) Jason Jung	2	1
16	(Canada) Brayden Schnur	6	6
(United States) Donald Young	6	6
Alt	(United States) Collin Altamirano	2	1

Semifinals
1/WC	(United States) Taylor Fritz	6	6
(France) Enzo Couacaud	1	4
16	(Canada) Brayden Schnur	6	3	7^{8}
(United States) Donald Young	2	6	6^{6}

Final
1/WC	(United States) Taylor Fritz	7^{9}	6
16	(Canada) Brayden Schnur	6^{7}	4

=== Top half ===
==== Section 1 ====
First round
(Portugal) G Oliveira	7^{7}	3	3
WC	(United States) M Giron	6^{3}	6	6
(United States) C Harrison	6	6^{5}	6
(United Kingdom) J Choinski	2	7^{7}	4
(Portugal) G Elias	5	4
(Brazil) T Bellucci	7	6
(Serbia) D Petrović	4	6	6
(Colombia) DE Galán	6	4	2

Second round
1/WC	(United States) T Fritz	2	7^{8}	7^{9}
WC	(United States) M Giron	6	6^{6}	6^{7}
(United States) C Harrison	6^{4}	2
13	(Ecuador) R Quiroz	7^{7}	6
10	(Germany) D Köpfer	4	4
(Brazil) T Bellucci	6	6
(Serbia) D Petrović	4	3
7	(Serbia) M Kecmanović	6	6

Third round
1/WC	(United States) T Fritz	6	6
13	(Ecuador) R Quiroz	3	3
(Brazil) T Bellucci	2	6	2
7	(Serbia) M Kecmanović	6	1	6

Quarterfinals
1/WC	(United States) T Fritz	2	6	6
7	(Serbia) M Kecmanović	6	4	3

==== Section 2 ====
First round
(Dominican Republic) R Cid Subervi	6	3	6^{2}
(Canada) F Peliwo	2	6	7^{7}
(Spain) M Vilella Martínez	4	3
(France) E Couacaud	6	6
WC	(United States) Roy Smith	2	5
(France) B Bonzi	6	7
Q	(United States) Evan Song	6^{5}	2
(Japan) K Uchida	7^{7}	6

Second round
4	(Italy) P Lorenzi	4	6	4
(Canada) F Peliwo	6	3	6
(France) E Couacaud	6	6
14	(United States) E Escobedo	4	4
12	(Barbados) D King	6	6
(France) B Bonzi	4	2
(Japan) K Uchida	0	6	7^{7}
5	(Canada) P Polansky	6	3	6^{5}

Third round
(Canada) F Peliwo	6	4	3
(France) E Couacaud	3	6	6
12	(Barbados) D King	6	4	6
(Japan) K Uchida	3	6	4

Quarterfinals
(France) E Couacaud	6	3	7^{7}
12	(Barbados) D King	3	6	6^{0}

=== Bottom half ===
==== Section 3 ====
First round
(Colombia) S Giraldo	6	7^{7}
(Italy) R Marcora	3	6^{5}
(United States) D Novikov	6	7
(Croatia) A Pavić	1	5
(United States) A Sarkissian	3	0
Q	(United States) M Cressy	6	6
(United States) M Krueger	7^{7}	7^{8}
(United States) E King	6^{5}	6^{6}

Second round
6	(Chinese Taipei) J Jung	7^{7}	7^{8}
(Colombia) S Giraldo	6^{5}	6^{6}
(United States) D Novikov	4	6	7^{7}
11	(United States) C Eubanks	6	1	6^{4}
16	(Canada) B Schnur	6	7
Q	(United States) M Cressy	2	5
(United States) M Krueger	3	4
3	(United States) M McDonald	6	6

Third round
6	(Chinese Taipei) J Jung	4	6	7
(United States) D Novikov	6	4	5
16	(Canada) B Schnur	6	6
3	(United States) M McDonald	2	4

Quarterfinals
6	(Chinese Taipei) J Jung	2	1
16	(Canada) B Schnur	6	6

==== Section 4 ====
First round
WC	(United States) U Blanch	6^{5}	6	4
(United States) JC Aragone	7^{7}	2	6
WC	(United States) P Kypson	3	2
(United States) D Young	6	6
(United States) T-S Kwiatkowski	3	4
(Dominican Republic) V Estrella Burgos	6	6
(Germany) D Brown	4	6	6
(El Salvador) M Arévalo	6	4	4

Second round
8	(United States) B Fratangelo	5	4
(United States) JC Aragone	7	6
(United States) D Young	6	6
9	(United States) N Rubin	4	3
Alt	(United States) C Altamirano	7	6
(Dominican Republic) V Estrella Burgos	5	2
(Germany) D Brown	6^{4}	6	6
LL	(United States) A Ayeni	7^{7}	3	3

Third round
(United States) JC Aragone	3	4
(United States) D Young	6	6
Alt	(United States) C Altamirano	7^{7}	6
(Germany) D Brown	6^{5}	2

Quarterfinals
(United States) D Young	6	6
Alt	(United States) C Altamirano	2	1
