= 2020 French Open – Day-by-day summaries =

Day-by-day summaries of the 2020 edition of the French Open tennis tournament

The 2020 French Open is described here in detail, in the form of day-by-day summaries.

All dates and times are CEST (UTC+2)

== Day 1 (27 September) ==
- Seeds out:
  - Men's Singles: (Belgium) David Goffin [11], (Croatia) Borna Ćorić [24], (Australia) Alex de Minaur [25], (United Kingdom) Dan Evans [32]
  - Women's Singles: (United Kingdom) Johanna Konta [9], (Estonia) Anett Kontaveit [17], (Ukraine) Dayana Yastremska [24]
- Schedule of Play

Matches on main courts
Matches on Court Philippe Chatrier
Event	Winner	Loser	Score
Men's Singles 1st Round	(Italy) Jannik Sinner	(Belgium) David Goffin [11]	7–5, 6–0, 6–3
Women's Singles 1st Round	(Romania) Simona Halep [1]	(Spain) Sara Sorribes Tormo	6–4, 6–0
Women's Singles 1st Round	(France) Caroline Garcia	(Estonia) Anett Kontaveit [17]	6–4, 3–6, 6–4
Men's Singles 1st Round	(Switzerland) Stan Wawrinka [16]	(United Kingdom) Andy Murray [WC]	6–1, 6–3, 6–2
Men's Singles 1st Round (Note: Originally scheduled for play on Court Suzanne Lenglen. Moved to Court Philippe Chatrier due to rain after the conclusion of Wawrinka–Murray match.)	(Germany) Alexander Zverev [6]	(Austria) Dennis Novak	7–5, 6–2, 6–4
Matches on Court Suzanne Lenglen
Event	Winner	Loser	Score
Women's Singles 1st Round	(Belarus) Victoria Azarenka [10]	(Montenegro) Danka Kovinić	6–1, 6–2
Men's Singles 1st Round	(Austria) Jurij Rodionov [Q]	(France) Jérémy Chardy	3–6, 4–6, 7–6^{(8–6)}, 6–4, 10–8
Women's Singles 1st Round	(United States) Coco Gauff	(United Kingdom) Johanna Konta [9]	6–3, 6–3
Matches on Court Simonne Mathieu
Event	Winner	Loser	Score
Women's Singles 1st Round	(Belgium) Elise Mertens [16]	(Russia) Margarita Gasparyan	6–2, 6–3
Women's Singles 1st Round	(Slovakia) Anna Karolína Schmiedlová [PR]	(United States) Venus Williams	6–4, 6–4
Men's Singles 1st Round	(France) Benoît Paire [23]	(South Korea) Kwon Soon-woo	7–5, 6–4, 6–4
Men's Singles 1st Round	(Argentina) Diego Schwartzman [12]	(Serbia) Miomir Kecmanović	6–0, 6–1, 6–3

== Day 2 (28 September) ==
- Seeds out:
  - Men's Singles: (Russia) Daniil Medvedev [4], (France) Gaël Monfils [8], (Italy) Fabio Fognini [14], (Canada) Félix Auger-Aliassime [19], (Serbia) Filip Krajinović [26], (Poland) Hubert Hurkacz [29]
  - Women's Singles: (United States) Madison Keys [12], (Czech Republic) Markéta Vondroušová [15], (Germany) Angelique Kerber [18], (Czech Republic) Karolína Muchová [22], (Russia) Svetlana Kuznetsova [28], (Poland) Magda Linette [31]
- Schedule of Play

Matches on main courts
Matches on Court Philippe Chatrier
Event	Winner	Loser	Score
Women's Singles 1st Round	(Czech Republic) Petra Kvitová [7]	(France) Océane Dodin	6–3, 7–5
Men's Singles 1st Round	(Austria) Dominic Thiem [3]	(Croatia) Marin Čilić	6–4, 6–3, 6–3
Women's Singles 1st Round	(United States) Serena Williams [6]	(United States) Kristie Ahn	7–6^{(7–2)}, 6–0
Men's Singles 1st Round	(Spain) Rafael Nadal [2]	(Belarus) Egor Gerasimov	6–4, 6–4, 6–2
Women's Singles 1st Round (Note: Originally scheduled for play on Court Simonne Mathieu. Moved to Court Philippe Chatrier due to match overruns after the conclusion of Gerasimov-Nadal match.)	(France) Alizé Cornet	(France) Chloé Paquet [WC]	6–3, 6–2
Matches on Court Suzanne Lenglen
Event	Winner	Loser	Score
Women's Singles 1st Round	(Netherlands) Kiki Bertens [5]	(Ukraine) Katarina Zavatska	2–6, 6–2, 6–0
Women's Singles 1st Round	(Ukraine) Elina Svitolina [3]	(Russia) Varvara Gracheva	7–6^{(7–2)}, 6–4
Men's Singles 1st Round	(Kazakhstan) Alexander Bublik	(France) Gaël Monfils [8]	6–4, 7–5, 3–6, 6–3
Men's Singles 1st Round	(Hungary) Márton Fucsovics	(Russia) Daniil Medvedev [4]	6–4, 7–6^{(7–3)}, 2–6, 6–1
Matches on Court Simonne Mathieu
Event	Winner	Loser	Score
Men's Singles 1st Round	(Kazakhstan) Mikhail Kukushkin	(Italy) Fabio Fognini [14]	7–5, 3–6, 7–6^{(7–1)}, 6–0
Women's Singles 1st Round	(Spain) Garbiñe Muguruza [11]	(Slovenia) Tamara Zidanšek	7–5, 4–6, 8–6
Men's Singles 1st Round	(Russia) Karen Khachanov [15]	(Poland) Kamil Majchrzak [PR]	7–6^{(7–3)}, 6–3, 6–3

== Day 3 (29 September) ==
- Seeds out:
  - Men's Singles: (Georgia (country)) Nikoloz Basilashvili [31]
  - Women's Singles: (United States) Alison Riske [19], (United States) Jennifer Brady [21], (Croatia) Donna Vekić [26]
  - Men's Doubles: (South Africa) Raven Klaasen / (Austria) Oliver Marach [10]
- Schedule of Play

Matches on main courts
Matches on Court Philippe Chatrier
Event	Winner	Loser	Score
Women's Singles 1st Round	(Czech Republic) Karolína Plíšková [2]	(Egypt) Mayar Sherif [Q]	6–7^{(9–11)}, 6–2, 6–4
Women's Singles 1st Round	(Germany) Laura Siegemund	(France) Kristina Mladenovic	7–5, 6–3
Men's Singles 1st Round	(Serbia) Novak Djokovic [1]	(Sweden) Mikael Ymer	6–0, 6–2, 6–3
Men's Singles 1st Round	(Canada) Denis Shapovalov [9]	(France) Gilles Simon	6–2, 7–5, 5–7, 6–3
Matches on Court Suzanne Lenglen
Event	Winner	Loser	Score
Men's Singles 1st Round	(Italy) Matteo Berrettini [7]	(Canada) Vasek Pospisil	6–3, 6–1, 6–3
Women's Singles 1st Round	(United States) Sofia Kenin [4]	(Russia) Liudmila Samsonova	6–4, 3–6, 6–3
Men's Singles 1st Round	(Greece) Stefanos Tsitsipas [5]	(Spain) Jaume Munar	4–6, 2–6, 6–1, 6–4, 6–4
Women's Singles 1st Round	(Belarus) Aryna Sabalenka [8]	(United States) Jessica Pegula	6–3, 6–1
Matches on Court Simonne Mathieu
Event	Winner	Loser	Score
Women's Singles 1st Round	(Denmark) Clara Tauson [Q]	(United States) Jennifer Brady [21]	6–4, 3–6, 9–7
Men's Singles 1st Round	(Russia) Andrey Rublev [13]	(United States) Sam Querrey	6–7^{(5–7)}, 6–7^{(4–7)}, 7–5, 6–4, 6–3
Men's Singles 1st Round	(Spain) Roberto Bautista Agut [10]	(France) Richard Gasquet	7–6^{(7–2)}, 6–2, 6–1
Women's Singles 1st Round	(Russia) Veronika Kudermetova	(France) Pauline Parmentier [WC]	6–2, 6–3

== Day 4 (30 September) ==
- Seeds out:
  - Men's Singles: (United States) John Isner [21], (France) Benoît Paire [23]
  - Women's Singles: (United States) Serena Williams [6], (Belarus) Victoria Azarenka [10], (Kazakhstan) Yulia Putintseva [23], (Czech Republic) Barbora Strýcová [32]
  - Women's Doubles: (Ukraine) Lyudmyla Kichenok / (Ukraine) Nadiia Kichenok [15]
- Schedule of Play

Matches on main courts
Matches on Court Philippe Chatrier
Event	Winner	Loser	Score
Women's Singles 2nd Round	(Ukraine) Elina Svitolina [3]	(Mexico) Renata Zarazúa [Q]	6–3, 0–6, 6–2
Women's Singles 2nd Round	(Bulgaria) Tsvetana Pironkova [WC]	(United States) Serena Williams [6]	Walkover
Women's Singles 2nd Round	(United States) Amanda Anisimova [25]	(United States) Bernarda Pera	6–2, 6–0
Men's Singles 2nd Round	(Spain) Rafael Nadal [2]	(United States) Mackenzie McDonald [PR]	6–1, 6–0, 6–3
Men's Singles 2nd Round	(Germany) Alexander Zverev [6]	(France) Pierre-Hugues Herbert	2–6, 6–4, 7–6^{(7–5)}, 4–6, 6–4
Men's Doubles 1st Round (Note: Originally scheduled for play on Court 5. Moved to Court Philippe Chatrier due to match overruns after the conclusion of Zverev-Herbert match.)	(Poland) Łukasz Kubot [2] (Brazil) Marcelo Melo [2]	(France) Arthur Cazaux [WC] (France) Harold Mayot [WC]	6–2, 6–2
Matches on Court Suzanne Lenglen
Event	Winner	Loser	Score
Men's Singles 2nd Round	(Switzerland) Stan Wawrinka [16]	(Germany) Dominik Koepfer	6–3, 6–2, 3–6, 6–1
Men's Singles 2nd Round	(Austria) Dominic Thiem [3]	(United States) Jack Sock [Q]	6–1, 6–3, 7–6^{(8–6)}
Women's Singles 2nd Round	(Romania) Simona Halep [1]	(Romania) Irina-Camelia Begu	6–3, 6–4
Women's Singles 2nd Round	(France) Caroline Garcia	(Belarus) Aliaksandra Sasnovich	7–6^{(7–5)}, 6–2
Men's Doubles 1st Round (Note: Originally scheduled for play on Court 12. Moved to Court Suzanne Lenglen due to match overruns after the conclusion of Garcia-Sasnovich match.)	(United Kingdom) Dan Evans (Poland) Hubert Hurkacz	(Brazil) Marcelo Demoliner (Netherlands) Matwé Middelkoop	7–6^{(7–2)}, 3–6, 7–5
Matches on Court Simonne Mathieu
Event	Winner	Loser	Score
Women's Singles 2nd Round	(Slovakia) Anna Karolína Schmiedlová [PR]	(Belarus) Victoria Azarenka [10]	6–2, 6–2
Men's Singles 2nd Round	(Argentina) Diego Schwartzman [12]	(Italy) Lorenzo Giustino [Q]	6–1, 7–5, 6–0
Men's Singles 2nd Round	(Argentina) Federico Coria	(France) Benoît Paire [23]	7–6^{(7–3)}, 3–6, 6–3, 6–1
Women's Singles 2nd Round	(Italy) Martina Trevisan [Q]	(United States) Coco Gauff	4–6, 6–2, 7–5

== Day 5 (1 October) ==
- Seeds out:
  - Men's Singles: (Canada) Denis Shapovalov [9], (Serbia) Dušan Lajović [22], (Germany) Jan-Lennard Struff [30]
  - Women's Singles: (Czech Republic) Karolína Plíšková [2], (Kazakhstan) Elena Rybakina [14], (United States) Sloane Stephens [29]
  - Men's Doubles: (Poland) Łukasz Kubot / (Brazil) Marcelo Melo [4]
  - Women's Doubles: (Czech Republic) Lucie Hradecká / (Slovenia) Andreja Klepač [11]
- Schedule of Play

Matches on main courts
Matches on Court Philippe Chatrier
Event	Winner	Loser	Score
Women's Singles 2nd Round	(Latvia) Jeļena Ostapenko	(Czech Republic) Karolína Plíšková [2]	6–4, 6–2
Women's Singles 2nd Round	(United States) Sofia Kenin [4]	(Romania) Ana Bogdan	3–6, 6–3, 6–2
Men's Singles 2nd Round	(Serbia) Novak Djokovic [1]	(Lithuania) Ričardas Berankis	6–1, 6–2, 6–2
Men's Singles 2nd Round	(Greece) Stefanos Tsitsipas [5]	(Uruguay) Pablo Cuevas	6–1, 6–4, 6–2
Women's Singles 2nd Round (Note: Originally scheduled for play on Court Suzanne Lenglen. Moved to Court Philippe Chatrier due to match overruns after the conclusion of Cuevas-Tsitsipas match.)	(France) Fiona Ferro	(Kazakhstan) Elena Rybakina [14]	6–3, 4–6, 6–2
Matches on Court Suzanne Lenglen
Event	Winner	Loser	Score
Men's Singles 2nd Round	(Spain) Roberto Carballés Baena	(Canada) Denis Shapovalov [9]	7–5, 6–7^{(5–7)}, 6–3, 3–6, 8–6
Women's Singles 2nd Round	(Spain) Garbiñe Muguruza [11]	(Czech Republic) Kristýna Plíšková	6–3, 6–2
Men's Singles 2nd Round	(Italy) Matteo Berrettini [7]	(South Africa) Lloyd Harris	6–4, 4–6, 6–2, 6–3
Matches on Court Simonne Mathieu
Event	Winner	Loser	Score
Women's Singles 2nd Round	(Czech Republic) Petra Kvitová [7]	(Italy) Jasmine Paolini	6–3, 6–3
Men's Singles 2nd Round	(Bulgaria) Grigor Dimitrov [18]	(Slovakia) Andrej Martin	6–4, 7–6^{(7–5)}, 6–1
Women's Singles 2nd Round	(China) Zhang Shuai	(France) Alizé Cornet	6–4, 7–6^{(7–3)}
Men's Singles 2nd Round	(Russia) Andrey Rublev [13]	(Spain) Alejandro Davidovich Fokina	7–5, 6–1, 3–6, 6–1

== Day 6 (2 October) ==
- Seeds out:
  - Men's Singles: (Switzerland) Stan Wawrinka [16], (United States) Taylor Fritz [27], (Norway) Casper Ruud [28]
  - Women's Singles: (Belgium) Elise Mertens [16], (Greece) Maria Sakkari [20], (United States) Amanda Anisimova [25], (Russia) Ekaterina Alexandrova [27]
  - Men's Doubles: (Australia) John Peers / (New Zealand) Michael Venus [11]
  - Women's Doubles: (Germany) Laura Siegemund / (Russia) Vera Zvonareva [12]
- Schedule of Play

Matches on main courts
Matches on Court Philippe Chatrier
Event	Winner	Loser	Score
Men's Singles 3rd Round	(Austria) Dominic Thiem [3]	(Norway) Casper Ruud [28]	6–4, 6–3, 6–1
Women's Singles 3rd Round	(Romania) Simona Halep [1]	(United States) Amanda Anisimova [25]	6–0, 6–1
Women's Singles 3rd Round	(France) Caroline Garcia	(Belgium) Elise Mertens [16]	1–6, 6–4, 7–5
Men's Singles 3rd Round	(Spain) Rafael Nadal [2]	(Italy) Stefano Travaglia	6–1, 6–4, 6–0
Women's Singles 3rd Round (Note: Originally scheduled for play on Court Suzanne Lenglen. Moved to Court Philippe Chatrier due to rain delay resulting in match overruns after the conclusion of Travaglia-Nadal match.)	(Netherlands) Kiki Bertens [5]	(Czech Republic) Kateřina Siniaková	6–2, 6–2
Matches on Court Suzanne Lenglen
Event	Winner	Loser	Score
Women's Singles 3rd Round	(Ukraine) Elina Svitolina [3]	(Russia) Ekaterina Alexandrova [27]	6–4, 7–5
Men's Singles 3rd Round	(France) Hugo Gaston [WC]	(Switzerland) Stan Wawrinka [16]	2–6, 6–3, 6–3, 4–6, 6–0
Men's Singles 3rd Round	(Germany) Alexander Zverev [6]	(Italy) Marco Cecchinato [Q]	6–1, 7–5, 6–3
Matches on Court Simonne Mathieu
Event	Winner	Loser	Score
Women's Singles 3rd Round	(Poland) Iga Świątek	(Canada) Eugenie Bouchard [WC]	6–3, 6–2
Men's Singles 3rd Round	(Italy) Lorenzo Sonego	(United States) Taylor Fritz [27]	7–6^{(7–5)}, 6–3, 7–6^{(19–17)}
Men's Singles 3rd Round	(Argentina) Diego Schwartzman [12]	(Slovakia) Norbert Gombos	7–6^{(7–3)}, 6–3, 6–3

== Day 7 (3 October) ==
- Seeds out:
  - Men's Singles: (Italy) Matteo Berrettini [7], (Spain) Roberto Bautista Agut [10], (Chile) Cristian Garín [20]
  - Women's Singles: (Belarus) Aryna Sabalenka [8], (Spain) Garbiñe Muguruza [11], (Croatia) Petra Martić [13]
  - Men's Doubles: (Spain) Marcel Granollers / (Argentina) Horacio Zeballos [2], (France) Jérémy Chardy / (France) Fabrice Martin [14], (United States) Austin Krajicek / (Croatia) Franko Škugor [16]
  - Women's Doubles: (Belgium) Elise Mertens / (Belarus) Aryna Sabalenka [3]
- Schedule of Play

Matches on main courts
Matches on Court Philippe Chatrier
Event	Winner	Loser	Score
Men's Singles 3rd Round	(Germany) Daniel Altmaier [Q]	(Italy) Matteo Berrettini [7]	6–2, 7–6^{(7–5)}, 6–4
Women's Singles 3rd Round	(United States) Sofia Kenin [4]	(Romania) Irina Bara [Q]	6–2, 6–0
Women's Singles 3rd Round	(France) Fiona Ferro	(Romania) Patricia Maria Țig	7–6^{(9–7)}, 4–6, 6–0
Men's Singles 3rd Round	(Serbia) Novak Djokovic [1]	(Colombia) Daniel Elahi Galán [LL]	6–0, 6–3, 6–2
Women's Singles 3rd Round (Note: Match began on Court Suzanne Lenglen. Moved to Court Philippe Chatrier due to rain during the second game of the first set.)	(United States) Danielle Collins	(Spain) Garbiñe Muguruza [11]	7–5, 2–6, 6–4
Matches on Court Suzanne Lenglen
Event	Winner	Loser	Score
Men's Singles 3rd Round	(Spain) Pablo Carreño Busta [17]	(Spain) Roberto Bautista Agut [10]	6–4, 6–3, 5–7, 6–4
Men's Singles 3rd Round	(Greece) Stefanos Tsitsipas [5]	(Slovenia) Aljaž Bedene	6–1, 6–2, 3–1, retired
Women's Singles 3rd Round	(Czech Republic) Petra Kvitová [7]	(Canada) Leylah Annie Fernandez	7–5, 6–3
Matches on Court Simonne Mathieu
Event	Winner	Loser	Score
Men's Singles 3rd Round	(Russia) Andrey Rublev [13]	(South Africa) Kevin Anderson [PR]	6–3, 6–2, 6–3
Women's Singles 3rd Round	(China) Zhang Shuai	(France) Clara Burel [WC]	7–6^{(7–2)}, 7–5
Men's Singles 3rd Round	(Bulgaria) Grigor Dimitrov [18]	(Spain) Roberto Carballés Baena	6–1, 6–3, retired
Women's Singles 3rd Round	(Spain) Paula Badosa	(Latvia) Jeļena Ostapenko	6–4, 6–3

== Day 8 (4 October) ==
- Seeds out:
  - Men's Singles: (Germany) Alexander Zverev [6]
  - Women's Singles: (Romania) Simona Halep [1], (Netherlands) Kiki Bertens [5]
  - Men's Doubles: (Croatia) Ivan Dodig / (Slovakia) Filip Polášek [5], (France) Pierre-Hugues Herbert / (France) Nicolas Mahut [6], (Netherlands) Jean-Julien Rojer / (Romania) Horia Tecău [12], (Austria) Jürgen Melzer / (France) Édouard Roger-Vasselin [15]
  - Women's Doubles: (Chinese Taipei) Hsieh Su-wei / (Czech Republic) Barbora Strýcová [1], (Canada) Gabriela Dabrowski / (Latvia) Jeļena Ostapenko [5], (Russia) Veronika Kudermetova / (China) Zhang Shuai [8], (United States) Hayley Carter / (Brazil) Luisa Stefani [10], (United States) Coco Gauff / (United States) Caty McNally [16]
- Schedule of Play

Matches on main courts
Matches on Court Philippe Chatrier
Event	Winner	Loser	Score
Women's Singles 4th Round	(Poland) Iga Świątek	(Romania) Simona Halep [1]	6–1, 6–2
Men's Singles 4th Round	(Spain) Rafael Nadal [2]	(United States) Sebastian Korda [Q]	6–1, 6–1, 6–2
Women's Singles 4th Round	(Ukraine) Elina Svitolina [3]	(France) Caroline Garcia	6–1, 6–3
Men's Singles 4th Round	(Austria) Dominic Thiem [3]	(France) Hugo Gaston [WC]	6–4, 6–4, 5–7, 3–6, 6–3
Matches on Court Suzanne Lenglen
Event	Winner	Loser	Score
Women's Singles 4th Round	(Italy) Martina Trevisan [Q]	(Netherlands) Kiki Bertens [5]	6–4, 6–4
Men's Singles 4th Round	(Italy) Jannik Sinner	(Germany) Alexander Zverev [6]	6–3, 6–3, 4–6, 6–3
Men's Singles 4th Round	(Argentina) Diego Schwartzman [12]	(Italy) Lorenzo Sonego	6–1, 6–3, 6–4
Matches on Court Simonne Mathieu
Event	Winner	Loser	Score
Men's Doubles 3rd Round	(Colombia) Juan Sebastián Cabal [1] (Colombia) Robert Farah [1]	(Austria) Jürgen Melzer [15] (France) Édouard Roger-Vasselin [15]	4−6, 7−6^{(7−3)}, 7−6^{(7−3)}
Women's Singles 4th Round	(Argentina) Nadia Podoroska [Q]	(Czech Republic) Barbora Krejčíková	2–6, 6–2, 6–3
Women's Doubles 3rd Round	(Hungary) Tímea Babos [2] (France) Kristina Mladenovic [2]	(Romania) Andreea Mitu (Romania) Patricia Maria Țig	6–2, 6–3
Men's Doubles 3rd Round (Note: Originally scheduled for play on Court Suzanne Lenglen. Moved to Court Simonne Mathieu due to match overruns.)	(Netherlands) Wesley Koolhof [9] (Croatia) Nikola Mektić [9]	(France) Pierre-Hugues Herbert [6] (France) Nicolas Mahut [6]	6–2, 7–6^{(7–3)}

== Day 9 (5 October) ==
- Seeds out:
  - Men's Singles: (Russia) Karen Khachanov [15], (Bulgaria) Grigor Dimitrov [18]
  - Men's Doubles: (United States) Rajeev Ram / (United Kingdom) Joe Salisbury [3]
  - Women's Doubles: (Czech Republic) Květa Peschke / (Netherlands) Demi Schuurs [6], (Slovakia) Viktória Kužmová / (Czech Republic) Kristýna Plíšková [13]
- Schedule of Play

Matches on main courts
Matches on Court Philippe Chatrier
Event	Winner	Loser	Score
Women's Singles 4th Round	(Czech Republic) Petra Kvitová [7]	(China) Zhang Shuai	6–2, 6–4
Men's Singles 4th Round	(Greece) Stefanos Tsitsipas [5]	(Bulgaria) Grigor Dimitrov [18]	6–3, 7–6^{(11–9)}, 6–2
Men's Singles 4th Round	(Serbia) Novak Djokovic [1]	(Russia) Karen Khachanov [15]	6–4, 6–3, 6–3
Women's Singles 4th Round	(United States) Sofia Kenin [4]	(France) Fiona Ferro	2–6, 6–2, 6–1
Men's Singles 4th Round (Note: Originally scheduled for play on Court Suzanne Lenglen after the conclusion of Jabeur-Collins match. Moved to Court Philippe Chatrier due to rain after the conclusion of Ferro-Kenin match.)	(Spain) Pablo Carreño Busta [17]	(Germany) Daniel Altmaier [Q]	6–2, 7–5, 6–2
Matches on Court Suzanne Lenglen
Event	Winner	Loser	Score
Men's Singles 4th Round	(Russia) Andrey Rublev [13]	(Hungary) Márton Fucsovics	6–7^{(4–7)}, 7–5, 6–4, 7–6^{(7–3)}
Women's Singles 4th Round	(Tunisia) Ons Jabeur [30] vs (United States) Danielle Collins		Postponed
Matches on Court Simonne Mathieu
Event	Winner	Loser	Score
Women's Singles 4th Round	(Germany) Laura Siegemund	(Spain) Paula Badosa	7–5, 6–2
Women's Doubles 3rd Round	(Czech Republic) Barbora Krejčíková [4] (Czech Republic) Kateřina Siniaková [4]	(Slovakia) Viktória Kužmová [13] (Czech Republic) Kristýna Plíšková [13]	6–4, 6–2
Men's Doubles Quarterfinals	(Colombia) Juan Sebastián Cabal [1] (Colombia) Robert Farah [1]	(Denmark) Frederik Nielsen (Germany) Tim Pütz	6–7^{(10–12)}, 6–4, 7–6^{(9–7)}

== Day 10 (6 October) ==
Play was set to start at 1200 CEST, but due to inclement weather in the latter half of the previous day, the women's singles fourth round match of Ons Jabeur and Danielle Collins was moved from Court Suzanne Lenglen to Court Philippe Chatrier to be started at 1100 CEST, with the quarterfinals matches to follow shortly thereafter.

- Seeds out:
  - Men's Singles: (Austria) Dominic Thiem [3]
  - Women's Singles: (Ukraine) Elina Svitolina [3], (Tunisia) Ons Jabeur [30]
  - Men's Doubles: (United Kingdom) Jamie Murray / (United Kingdom) Neal Skupski [13]
  - Women's Doubles: (United States) Sofia Kenin / (United States) Bethanie Mattek-Sands [9]
- Schedule of Play

Matches on main courts
Matches on Court Philippe Chatrier
Event	Winner	Loser	Score
Women's Singles 4th Round	(United States) Danielle Collins	(Tunisia) Ons Jabeur [30]	6–4, 4–6, 6–4
Women's Singles Quarterfinals	(Argentina) Nadia Podoroska [Q]	(Ukraine) Elina Svitolina [3]	6–2, 6–4
Men's Singles Quarterfinals	(Argentina) Diego Schwartzman [12]	(Austria) Dominic Thiem [3]	7–6^{(7–1)}, 5–7, 6–7^{(6–8)}, 7–6^{(7–5)}, 6–2
Women's Singles Quarterfinals	(Poland) Iga Świątek	(Italy) Martina Trevisan [Q]	6–3, 6–1
Men's Singles Quarterfinals	(Spain) Rafael Nadal [2]	(Italy) Jannik Sinner	7–6^{(7–4)}, 6–4, 6–1
Matches on Court Suzanne Lenglen
Event	Winner	Loser	Score
Men's Doubles Quarterfinals	(Germany) Kevin Krawietz [8] (Germany) Andreas Mies [8]	(United Kingdom) Jamie Murray [13] (United Kingdom) Neal Skupski [13]	6–4, 6–4
Women's Doubles Quarterfinals	(Hungary) Tímea Babos [2] (France) Kristina Mladenovic [2]	(Ukraine) Marta Kostyuk (Belarus) Aliaksandra Sasnovich	6–2, 7–5
Women's Doubles Quarterfinals	(Czech Republic) Barbora Krejčíková [4] (Czech Republic) Kateřina Siniaková [4]	(United States) Sofia Kenin [9] (United States) Bethanie Mattek-Sands [9]	1–6, 6–4, 6–2
Men's Doubles Quarterfinals	(Netherlands) Wesley Koolhof [9] (Croatia) Nikola Mektić [9]	(United States) Nicholas Monroe (United States) Tommy Paul	6–4, 6–4

== Day 11 (7 October) ==
- Seeds out:
  - Men's Singles: (Russia) Andrey Rublev [13], (Spain) Pablo Carreño Busta [17]
  - Women's Doubles: (Japan) Shuko Aoyama / (Japan) Ena Shibahara [7]
- Schedule of Play

Matches on main courts
Matches on Court Philippe Chatrier
Event	Winner	Loser	Score
Women's Singles Quarterfinals	(Czech Republic) Petra Kvitová [7]	(Germany) Laura Siegemund	6–3, 6–3
Women's Singles Quarterfinals	(United States) Sofia Kenin [4]	(United States) Danielle Collins	6–4, 4–6, 6–0
Men's Singles Quarterfinals	(Greece) Stefanos Tsitsipas [5]	(Russia) Andrey Rublev [13]	7–5, 6–2, 6–3
Men's Singles Quarterfinals	(Serbia) Novak Djokovic [1]	(Spain) Pablo Carreño Busta [17]	4–6, 6–2, 6–3, 6–4
Matches on Court Suzanne Lenglen
Event	Winner	Loser	Score
Women's Doubles Quarterfinals	(Chile) Alexa Guarachi [14] (United States) Desirae Krawczyk [14]	(Japan) Shuko Aoyama [7] (Japan) Ena Shibahara [7]	6–0, 6–4
Women's Doubles Quarterfinals	(United States) Nicole Melichar (Poland) Iga Świątek	(United States) Asia Muhammad (United States) Jessica Pegula	6–3, 6–4

== Day 12 (8 October) ==
- Seeds out:
  - Women's Singles: (Czech Republic) Petra Kvitová [7]
  - Men's Doubles: (Colombia) Juan Sebastián Cabal / (Colombia) Robert Farah [1], (Netherlands) Wesley Koolhof / (Croatia) Nikola Mektić [9]
- Schedule of Play

Matches on main courts
Matches on Court Philippe Chatrier
Event	Winner	Loser	Score
Women's Singles Semifinals	(Poland) Iga Świątek	(Argentina) Nadia Podoroska [Q]	6–2, 6–1
Women's Singles Semifinals	(United States) Sofia Kenin [4]	(Czech Republic) Petra Kvitová [7]	6–4, 7–5
Matches on Court Suzanne Lenglen
Event	Winner	Loser	Score
Men's Doubles Semifinals	(Croatia) Mate Pavić [7] (Brazil) Bruno Soares [7]	(Colombia) Juan Sebastián Cabal [1] (Colombia) Robert Farah [1]	7–6^{(7–4)}, 7–5
Men's Doubles Semifinals	(Germany) Kevin Krawietz [8] (Germany) Andreas Mies [8]	(Netherlands) Wesley Koolhof [9] (Croatia) Nikola Mektić [9]	6–3, 7–5

== Day 13 (9 October) ==
- Seeds out:
  - Men's Singles: (Greece) Stefanos Tsitsipas [5], (Argentina) Diego Schwartzman [12]
  - Women's Doubles: (Czech Republic) Barbora Krejčíková / (Czech Republic) Kateřina Siniaková [4]
- Schedule of Play

Matches on main courts
Matches on Court Philippe Chatrier
Event	Winner	Loser	Score
Men's Singles Semifinals	(Spain) Rafael Nadal [2]	(Argentina) Diego Schwartzman [12]	6–3, 6–3, 7–6^{(7–0)}
Men's Singles Semifinals	(Serbia) Novak Djokovic [1]	(Greece) Stefanos Tsitsipas [5]	6–3, 6–2, 5–7, 4–6, 6–1
Matches on Court Suzanne Lenglen
Event	Winner	Loser	Score
Women's Doubles Semifinals	(Hungary) Tímea Babos [2] (France) Kristina Mladenovic [2]	(Czech Republic) Barbora Krejčíková [4] (Czech Republic) Kateřina Siniaková [4]	6–2, 4–6, 7–5
Women's Doubles Semifinals	(Chile) Alexa Guarachi [14] (United States) Desirae Krawczyk [14]	(United States) Nicole Melichar (Poland) Iga Świątek	7–6^{(7–5)}, 1–6, 6–4

== Day 14 (10 October) ==
- Seeds out:
  - Women's Singles: (United States) Sofia Kenin [4]
  - Men's Doubles: (Croatia) Mate Pavić / (Brazil) Bruno Soares [7]
- Schedule of Play

Matches on main courts
Matches on Court Philippe Chatrier
Event	Winner	Loser	Score
Women's Singles Final	(Poland) Iga Świątek	(United States) Sofia Kenin [4]	6–4, 6–1
Men's Doubles Final	(Germany) Kevin Krawietz [8] (Germany) Andreas Mies [8]	(Croatia) Mate Pavić [7] (Brazil) Bruno Soares [7]	6–3, 7–5
Matches on Court Suzanne Lenglen
Event	Winner	Loser	Score
Wheelchair Men's Singles Final	(United Kingdom) Alfie Hewett	(Belgium) Joachim Gérard	6–4, 4–6, 6–3
Wheelchair Quad Singles Final	(Australia) Dylan Alcott [1]	(United Kingdom) Andy Lapthorne [2]	6–2, 6–2
Wheelchair Women's Doubles Final	(Netherlands) Diede de Groot [1] (Netherlands) Aniek van Koot [1]	(Japan) Yui Kamiji [2] (United Kingdom) Jordanne Whiley [2]	7–6^{(7–2)}, 3–6, [10–8]

== Day 15 (11 October) ==
- Seeds out:
  - Men's Singles: (Serbia) Novak Djokovic [1]
  - Women's Doubles: (Chile) Alexa Guarachi / (United States) Desirae Krawczyk [14]
- Schedule of Play

Matches on main courts
Matches on Court Philippe Chatrier
Event	Winner	Loser	Score
Women's Doubles Finals	(Hungary) Tímea Babos [2] (France) Kristina Mladenovic [2]	(Chile) Alexa Guarachi [14] (United States) Desirae Krawczyk [14]	6–4, 7–5
Men's Singles Final	(Spain) Rafael Nadal [2]	(Serbia) Novak Djokovic [1]	6–0, 6–2, 7–5
