= 2020 Oracle Challenger Series – Newport Beach – Men's singles =

Newport Beach – Men's singles
- 2020 Oracle Challenger Series – Newport Beach

Final
- Champion: (United States) Thai-Son Kwiatkowski
- Runner-up: (Colombia) Daniel Elahi Galán
- Score: 6–4, 6–1

Events
Singles	men	women
Doubles	men	women
- Oracle Challenger Series – Newport Beach

Taylor Fritz was the defending champion but lost in the third round to Mitchell Krueger.

Thai-Son Kwiatkowski won the title after defeating Daniel Elahi Galán 6–4, 6–1 in the final.

== Seeds ==
All seeds receive a bye into the second round.

1. (United States) Taylor Fritz (third round)
2. (United States) Frances Tiafoe (third round)
3. (Serbia) Miomir Kecmanović (third round)
4. (United States) Steve Johnson (semifinals)
5. (Italy) Andreas Seppi (second round)
6. (Canada) Brayden Schnur (third round)
7. (United States) Marcos Giron (second round)
8. (Chinese Taipei) Jason Jung (second round)
9. (United States) Mackenzie McDonald (second round)
10. (United States) Bradley Klahn (quarterfinals)
11. (Ecuador) Emilio Gómez (second round)
12. (Romania) Marius Copil (second round)
13. (United States) Mitchell Krueger (semifinals)
14. (Germany) Rudolf Molleker (second round)
15. (Uzbekistan) Denis Istomin (quarterfinals)
16. (Canada) Peter Polansky (second round)

== Draw ==
Key

- Q = Qualifier
- WC = Wild card
- LL = Lucky loser
- Alt = Alternate
- ITF = ITF entry
- PR = Protected ranking
- SR = Special ranking
- SE = Special exempt
- JE = Junior exempt
- JR = Junior Accelerator Programme entrant
- CO = College Accelerator Programme entrant
- NG = Next Gen Accelerator Program entrant
- w/o = Walkover
- r = Retired
- d = Defaulted

=== Finals ===
Quarterfinals
13	(United States) Mitchell Krueger	6	6^{5}	6
PR	(United States) Raymond Sarmiento	3	7^{7}	3
(Colombia) Daniel Elahi Galán	4	7^{7}	6
(United States) Christopher Eubanks	6	6^{5}	3
10	(United States) Bradley Klahn	4	2
4	(United States) Steve Johnson	6	6
(United States) Thai-Son Kwiatkowski	7^{8}	6
15	(Uzbekistan) Denis Istomin	6^{6}	4

Semifinals
13	(United States) Mitchell Krueger	2	6^{3}
(Colombia) Daniel Elahi Galán	6	7^{7}
4	(United States) Steve Johnson	6	6^{4}	1
(United States) Thai-Son Kwiatkowski	3	7^{7}	6

Final
(Colombia) Daniel Elahi Galán	4	1
(United States) Thai-Son Kwiatkowski	6	6

=== Top half ===
==== Section 1 ====
First round
WC	(United States) G Nanda	4	0
Q	(Argentina) A Velotti	6	6
(United States) D Young	1	7^{7}	6
(United States) B Nakashima	6	6^{5}	4
(United States) K King	4	5
PR	(United States) R Sarmiento	6	7
(United States) JC Aragone	6	6
(Japan) K Uchida	1	3

Second round
1/WC	(United States) T Fritz	6	6
Q	(Argentina) A Velotti	3	3
(United States) D Young	6	1	4
13	(United States) M Krueger	3	6	6
9	(United States) M McDonald	5	4
PR	(United States) R Sarmiento	7	6
(United States) JC Aragone	6	7^{7}
5	(Italy) A Seppi	2	6^{2}

Third round
1/WC	(United States) T Fritz	4	6	3
13	(United States) M Krueger	6	3	6
PR	(United States) R Sarmiento	7	7^{7}
(United States) JC Aragone	5	6^{3}

Quarterfinals
13	(United States) M Krueger	6	6^{5}	6
PR	(United States) R Sarmiento	3	7^{7}	3

==== Section 2 ====
First round
(Japan) Yo Watanuki	6	6
(Tunisia) S Mansouri	3	1
(Colombia) DE Galán	6	3	6
(United Kingdom) J Ward	4	6	2
WC	(United States) Mi Redlicki	7	6
(United States) R Harrison	5	2
Q	(United States) A Sarkissian	4	5
(United States) C Eubanks	6	7

Second round
3	(Serbia) M Kecmanović	6	4	6
(Japan) Yo Watanuki	1	6	3
(Colombia) DE Galán	6	6
14	(Germany) R Molleker	3	1
12	(Romania) M Copil	6^{3}	4
WC	(United States) Mi Redlicki	7^{7}	6
(United States) C Eubanks	6	7
8	(Chinese Taipei) J Jung	4	5

Third round
3	(Serbia) M Kecmanović	3	7^{8}	3
(Colombia) DE Galán	6	6^{6}	6
WC	(United States) Mi Redlicki	6	1	4
(United States) C Eubanks	3	6	6

Quarterfinals
(Colombia) DE Galán	4	7^{7}	6
(United States) C Eubanks	6	6^{5}	3

=== Bottom half ===
==== Section 3 ====
First round
(Switzerland) S Ehrat	3	6	2
(United States) S Korda	6	4	6
(United States) E Escobedo	6	7
(Brazil) T Bellucci	1	5
WC	(United States) U Blanch	2	5
(Australia) A Vukic	6	7
(Ecuador) R Quiroz	5
(Ecuador) G Escobar	1^{r}

Second round
7	(United States) M Giron	4	6	6^{5}
(United States) S Korda	6	3	7^{7}
(United States) E Escobedo	5	1
10	(United States) B Klahn	7	6
16	(Canada) P Polansky	7^{7}	6^{6}	4
(Australia) A Vukic	6^{5}	7^{8}	6
(Ecuador) R Quiroz	3	2
4	(United States) S Johnson	6	6

Third round
(United States) S Korda	7	3	4
10	(United States) B Klahn	5	6	6
(Australia) A Vukic	6^{6}	7^{7}	6^{4}
4	(United States) S Johnson	7^{8}	6^{4}	7^{7}

Quarterfinals
10	(United States) B Klahn	4	2
4	(United States) S Johnson	6	6

==== Section 4 ====
First round
(United States) M Cressy	6	6
(Portugal) G Oliveira	1	4
(United States) C Altamirano	1	3
(United States) T-S Kwiatkowski	6	6
(Kazakhstan) D Popko	6^{3}	6	4
(United States) S Bangoura	7^{7}	4	6
(Dominican Republic) R Cid Subervi	6^{7}	2
(Chile) A Tabilo	7^{9}	6

Second round
6	(Canada) B Schnur	6	6
(United States) M Cressy	4	2
(United States) T-S Kwiatkowski	7	6
11	(Ecuador) E Gómez	5	3
15	(Uzbekistan) D Istomin	7^{8}	6
(United States) S Bangoura	6^{6}	4
(Chile) A Tabilo	4	2
2/WC	(United States) F Tiafoe	6	6

Third round
6	(Canada) B Schnur	6	3	2
(United States) T-S Kwiatkowski	3	6	6
15	(Uzbekistan) D Istomin	6	6
2/WC	(United States) F Tiafoe	3	2

Quarterfinals
(United States) T-S Kwiatkowski	7^{8}	6
15	(Uzbekistan) D Istomin	6^{6}	4
