= 2020 Oracle Challenger Series – Newport Beach – Men's doubles =

Newport Beach – Men's doubles
- 2020 Oracle Challenger Series – Newport Beach

Final
- Champions: (Uruguay) Ariel Behar (Ecuador) Gonzalo Escobar
- Runners-up: (Croatia) Antonio Šančić (Austria) Tristan-Samuel Weissborn
- Score: 6–2, 6–4

Events
Singles	men	women
Doubles	men	women
- Oracle Challenger Series – Newport Beach

Robert Galloway and Nathaniel Lammons were the defending champions but only Lammons chose to defend his title, partnering Hunter Reese. Lammons lost in the first round to Sekou Bangoura and Sebastian Korda.

Ariel Behar and Gonzalo Escobar won the title after defeating Antonio Šančić and Tristan-Samuel Weissborn 6–2, 6–4 in the final.

== Seeds ==
1. (Uruguay) Ariel Behar / (Ecuador) Gonzalo Escobar (champions)
2. (United States) Nicholas Monroe / (United States) Jackson Withrow (quarterfinals)
3. (Sweden) André Göransson / (Indonesia) Christopher Rungkat (semifinals)
4. (United States) Nathaniel Lammons / (United States) Hunter Reese (first round)

== Draw ==
Key

- Q = Qualifier
- WC = Wild card
- LL = Lucky loser
- Alt = Alternate
- ITF = ITF entry
- PR = Protected ranking
- SR = Special ranking
- SE = Special exempt
- JE = Junior exempt
- JR = Junior Accelerator Programme entrant
- CO = College Accelerator Programme entrant
- NG = Next Gen Accelerator Program entrant
- w/o = Walkover
- r = Retired
- d = Defaulted

First round
1	(Uruguay) A Behar (Ecuador) G Escobar	6	6
(United States) A Lawson (United States) D Novikov	3	3
(Canada) P Polansky (Canada) B Schnur	4	4
(Venezuela) LD Martínez (Mexico) MÁ Reyes-Varela	6	6
4	(United States) N Lammons (United States) H Reese	4	4
WC	(United States) S Bangoura (United States) S Korda	6	6
WC	(United States) H Johnson (United States) Y Johnson	7	3	[8]
(Romania) M Copil (United States) C Eubanks	5	6	[10]
(Uzbekistan) D Istomin (Brazil) F Romboli	7^{7}	2	[10]
(United States) J Cerretani (United States) M Cressy	6^{5}	6	[7]
(Ecuador) E Gómez (Portugal) G Oliveira	4	6	[6]
3	(Sweden) A Göransson (Indonesia) C Rungkat	6	3	[10]
(United States) M Giron (United States) B Klahn	6	3	[4]
(Croatia) A Šančić (Austria) T-S Weissborn	2	6	[10]
WC	(United States) C Harrison (United States) R Harrison	3	7^{13}	[2]
2	(United States) N Monroe (United States) J Withrow	6	6^{11}	[10]

Quarterfinals
1	(Uruguay) A Behar (Ecuador) G Escobar	3	6	[10]
(Venezuela) LD Martínez (Mexico) MÁ Reyes-Varela	6	3	[8]
WC	(United States) S Bangoura (United States) S Korda	6^{5}	7	[8]
(Romania) M Copil (United States) C Eubanks	7^{7}	5	[10]
(Uzbekistan) D Istomin (Brazil) F Romboli	1	6^{1}
3	(Sweden) A Göransson (Indonesia) C Rungkat	6	7^{7}
(Croatia) A Šančić (Austria) T-S Weissborn	6	6
2	(United States) N Monroe (United States) J Withrow	3	1

Semifinals
1	(Uruguay) A Behar (Ecuador) G Escobar	6	6
(Romania) M Copil (United States) C Eubanks	4	3
3	(Sweden) A Göransson (Indonesia) C Rungkat	6^{2}	5
(Croatia) A Šančić (Austria) T-S Weissborn	7^{7}	7

Final
1	(Uruguay) A Behar (Ecuador) G Escobar	6	6
(Croatia) A Šančić (Austria) T-S Weissborn	2	4
