= 2020 TK Sparta Prague Open – Singles =

Singles
- 2020 TK Sparta Prague Open

Final
- Champion: (Slovakia) Kristína Kučová
- Runner-up: (Italy) Elisabetta Cocciaretto
- Score: 6–4, 6–3

Events
Singles	Doubles
TK Sparta Prague Open

The 2020 TK Sparta Prague Open was a women's tennis tournament played on Clay in Prague, Czech Republic, and was part of the 2020 WTA 125K series.

This was the first edition and was held from 29 August to 6 September 2020.

Kristína Kučová won the title, defeating Elisabetta Cocciaretto in the final, 6–4, 6–3.

== Seeds ==
1. (Romania) Monica Niculescu (second round)
2. (Italy) Elisabetta Cocciaretto (final)
3. (United Kingdom) Harriet Dart (first round)
4. (Switzerland) Leonie Küng (third round)
5. (Spain) Lara Arruabarrena (third round)
6. (Italy) Sara Errani (second round)
7. (Italy) Martina Trevisan (second round)
8. (Italy) Giulia Gatto-Monticone (third round)
9. (Poland) Magdalena Fręch (first round)
10. (Romania) Irina Bara (third round)
11. (Romania) Jaqueline Cristian (third round)
12. (Argentina) Nadia Podoroska (semifinals)
13. (India) Ankita Raina (first round)
14. (Slovakia) Jana Čepelová (first round)
15. (Netherlands) Lesley Pattinama Kerkhove (first round)
16. (Romania) Elena-Gabriela Ruse (second round)

17. (Egypt) Mayar Sherif (third round)
18. (Slovakia) Kristína Kučová (champion)
19. (Serbia) Olga Danilović (second round)
20. (France) Chloé Paquet (first round)
21. (Spain) Cristina Bucșa (third round)
22. (United States) Varvara Lepchenko (first round)
23. (United Kingdom) Samantha Murray Sharan (first round)
24. (Slovakia) Anna Karolína Schmiedlová (quarterfinals)
25. (Netherlands) Indy de Vroome (first round)
26. (Georgia (country)) Mariam Bolkvadze (second round)
27. (Turkey) Çağla Büyükakçay (quarterfinals)
28. (Bulgaria) Isabella Shinikova (second round)
29. (Netherlands) Bibiane Schoofs (third round)
30. (Mexico) Renata Zarazúa (fourth round)
31. (Italy) Martina Di Giuseppe (second round)
32. (Slovakia) Rebecca Šramková (second round)

Click on the seed number of a player to go to their draw section.

== Draw ==
=== Key ===
- Q = Qualifier
- WC = Wild card
- LL = Lucky loser
- Alt = Alternate
- ITF = ITF entry
- PR = Protected ranking
- SR = Special ranking
- SE = Special exempt
- JE = Junior exempt
- JR = Junior Accelerator Programme entrant
- CO = College Accelerator Programme entrant
- NG = Next Gen Accelerator Program entrant
- w/o = Walkover
- r = Retired
- d = Defaulted

=== Finals ===
Quarterfinals
(United Kingdom) Francesca Jones	0	2
18	(Slovakia) Kristína Kučová	6	6
(Serbia) Ivana Jorović	6	6
27	(Turkey) Çağla Büyükakçay	3	3
12	(Argentina) Nadia Podoroska	6	6
(Russia) Marina Melnikova	2	2
24	(Slovakia) Anna Karolína Schmiedlová	6	2	1
2	(Italy) Elisabetta Cocciaretto	3	6	6

Semifinals
18	(Slovakia) Kristína Kučová	6	6
(Serbia) Ivana Jorović	3	1
12	(Argentina) Nadia Podoroska	4	3
2	(Italy) Elisabetta Cocciaretto	6	6

Final
18	(Slovakia) Kristína Kučová	6	6
2	(Italy) Elisabetta Cocciaretto	4	3

=== Top half ===
==== Section 1 ====
First round
1	(Romania) M Niculescu	7^{8}	7^{7}
(Hungary) P Udvardy	6^{6}	6^{4}
(Spain) A Lázaro García	6	6
(North Macedonia) L Gjorcheska	4	2
(United Kingdom) F Jones	6^{4}	6	6
WC	(Czech Republic) B Palicová	7^{7}	2	1
WC	(Czech Republic) K Lavičková	1	5
32	(Slovakia) R Šramková	6	7
23	(United Kingdom) S Murray Sharan	3	4
PR	(Germany) S Lisicki	6	6
(Russia) A Gasanova	4	3
(Germany) S Wagner	6	6
(France) H Tan	6	6
(Switzerland) C Perrin	3	4
(Japan) C Muramatsu	7^{7}	1	6
14	(Slovakia) J Čepelová	6^{5}	6	2

Second round
1	(Romania) M Niculescu	4	4
(Spain) A Lázaro García	6	6
(United Kingdom) F Jones	6	1	6
32	(Slovakia) R Šramková	2	6	2
PR	(Germany) S Lisicki	6	6
(Germany) S Wagner	4	4
(France) H Tan	6	3	1^{r}
(Japan) C Muramatsu	4	6	5

Third round
(Spain) A Lázaro García	5	4
(United Kingdom) F Jones	7	6
PR	(Germany) S Lisicki	6	6
(Japan) C Muramatsu	4	4

Fourth round
(United Kingdom) F Jones	6	5	6
PR	(Germany) S Lisicki	4	7	4

==== Section 2 ====
First round
9	(Poland) M Fręch	3	6	3
(Japan) K Okamura	6	2	6
(India) R Bhatia	0	0
WC	(Czech Republic) L Havlíčková	6	6
(Romania) LI Paar	6	6
(Germany) J Niemeier	3	4
(Croatia) T Mrdeža	4	4
18	(Slovakia) K Kučová	6	6
26	(Georgia (country)) M Bolkvadze	2	6	6
(Russia) V Savinykh	6	3	4
(Poland) M Chwalińska	6	6
WC	(Czech Republic) S Bejlek	0	1
WC	(Czech Republic) L Fruhvirtová	3	2
(Denmark) C Tauson	6	6
(Argentina) P Ormaechea	6	5	6^{7}
6	(Italy) S Errani	0	7	7^{9}

Second round
(Japan) K Okamura	6	6
WC	(Czech Republic) L Havlíčková	4	4
(Romania) LI Paar	3	6^{3}
18	(Slovakia) K Kučová	6	7^{7}
26	(Georgia (country)) M Bolkvadze	1	1
(Poland) M Chwalińska	6	6
(Denmark) C Tauson	6	7
6	(Italy) S Errani	3	5

Third round
(Japan) K Okamura	2	1
18	(Slovakia) K Kučová	6	6
(Poland) M Chwalińska	6^{2}	2
(Denmark) C Tauson	7^{7}	6

Fourth round
18	(Slovakia) K Kučová	1	6	6
(Denmark) C Tauson	6	1	3

==== Section 3 ====
First round
4	(Switzerland) L Küng	6	6
Alt	(Australia) I Popovic	1	0
(Mexico) AS Sánchez	3	6	7^{7}
(United States) C Harrison	6	4	6^{3}
(Spain) I Burillo Escorihuela	4	5
(Italy) J Pieri	6	7
PR	(Ukraine) D Lopatetska	6	6
25	(Netherlands) I de Vroome	2	3
17	(Egypt) M Sherif	7^{7}	7
WC	(Czech Republic) L Nosková	6^{3}	5
(Hungary) D Gálfi	6	6
(France) J Ponchet	0	2
(Croatia) L Bošković	1	5
(Serbia) I Jorović	6	7
(Romania) I Fetecău	2	4
16	(Romania) E-G Ruse	6	6

Second round
4	(Switzerland) L Küng	6	6
(Mexico) AS Sánchez	3	4
(Italy) J Pieri	3	7^{7}	6
PR	(Ukraine) D Lopatetska	6	6^{2}	4
17	(Egypt) M Sherif	6^{7}	6	6
(Hungary) D Gálfi	7^{9}	3	1
(Serbia) I Jorović	6	6
16	(Romania) E-G Ruse	3	4

Third round
4	(Switzerland) L Küng	6	1	4
(Italy) J Pieri	1	6	6
17	(Egypt) M Sherif	6^{5}	1
(Serbia) I Jorović	7^{7}	6

Fourth round
(Italy) J Pieri	0	0^{r}
(Serbia) I Jorović	6	0

==== Section 4 ====
First round
10	(Romania) I Bara	6	6
(Slovakia) Z Zlochová	2	2
(Australia) S Mendez	6	6
(United Kingdom) A Carreras	2	2
(Romania) G Talabă	3	3
(Russia) V Kan	6	6
(Belgium) M Benoît	7^{8}	7^{7}
22	(United States) V Lepchenko	6^{6}	6^{4}
27	(Turkey) Ç Büyükakçay	7	6
(United States) G Min	5	4
(United States) K Volynets	2	5
(Brazil) G Cé	6	7
(Croatia) T Lukas	6	6
WC	(Czech Republic) N Bartůňková	1	2
(Croatia) J Fett	5	1
8	(Italy) G Gatto-Monticone	7	6

Second round
10	(Romania) I Bara	6	6
(Australia) S Mendez	3	0
(Russia) V Kan	2	1
(Belgium) M Benoît	6	6
27	(Turkey) Ç Büyükakçay	4	6	7^{7}
(Brazil) G Cé	6	1	6^{1}
(Croatia) T Lukas	3	3
8	(Italy) G Gatto-Monticone	6	6

Third round
10	(Romania) I Bara	3	2
(Belgium) M Benoît	6	6
27	(Turkey) Ç Büyükakçay	6	6
8	(Italy) G Gatto-Monticone	1	3

Fourth round
(Belgium) M Benoît	3	6^{5}
27	(Turkey) Ç Büyükakçay	6	7^{7}

=== Bottom half ===
==== Section 5 ====
First round
5	(Spain) L Arruabarrena	7	6
(Russia) V Ivakhnenko	5	1
(Switzerland) S Waltert	6	3	4
(Sweden) M Björklund	3	6	6
(France) A Hesse	5	2
(Belgium) M Zanevska	7	6
(Spain) E Guerrero Álvarez	6	4	5
28	(Bulgaria) I Shinikova	2	6	7
21	(Spain) C Bucșa	6	6
(Russia) A Komardina	0	2
(United States) E Halbauer	1	6	5
(Liechtenstein) K von Deichmann	6	2	7
(Austria) J Grabher	4	4
(Colombia) C Osorio	6	6
WC	(Czech Republic) D Viďmanová	2	1
12	(Argentina) N Podoroska	6	6

Second round
5	(Spain) L Arruabarrena	6	6
(Sweden) M Björklund	0	3
(Belgium) M Zanevska	6	7^{7}
28	(Bulgaria) I Shinikova	1	6^{4}
21	(Spain) C Bucșa	5	6	6
(Liechtenstein) K von Deichmann	7	4	3
(Colombia) C Osorio	3	6^{4}
12	(Argentina) N Podoroska	6	7^{7}

Third round
5	(Spain) L Arruabarrena	3	6	5
(Belgium) M Zanevska	6	2	7
21	(Spain) C Bucșa	2	1
12	(Argentina) N Podoroska	6	6

Fourth round
(Belgium) M Zanevska	5	2
12	(Argentina) N Podoroska	7	6

==== Section 6 ====
First round
13	(India) A Raina	2	6^{8}
(Russia) M Melnikova	6	7^{10}
(Ukraine) D Snigur	2	2
(Hungary) A Bondár	6	6
(Romania) N Dascălu	6	5	3
(Belgium) L Salden	3	7	6
(Netherlands) R Hogenkamp	1	6	7^{7}
20	(France) C Paquet	6	1	6^{3}
30	(Mexico) R Zarazúa	6	7^{7}
(Canada) E Bouchard	0	6^{5}
(Hungary) RL Jani	6	6
(Poland) U Radwańska	1	1
PR	(Czech Republic) M Kolodziejová	6	6
PR	(Turkey) B Eraydın	3	2
(Japan) Y Naito	1	6	6
3	(United Kingdom) H Dart	6	2	2

Second round
(Russia) M Melnikova	7	6
(Hungary) A Bondár	5	2
(Belgium) L Salden	6	6^{4}	6
(Netherlands) R Hogenkamp	4	7^{7}	2
30	(Mexico) R Zarazúa	6	6
(Hungary) RL Jani	4	3
PR	(Czech Republic) M Kolodziejová	6	3	6
(Japan) Y Naito	0	6	3

Third round
(Russia) M Melnikova	6	7
(Belgium) L Salden	1	5
30	(Mexico) R Zarazúa	6	6^{6}	6
PR	(Czech Republic) M Kolodziejová	2	7^{8}	2

Fourth round
(Russia) M Melnikova	6	6
30	(Mexico) R Zarazúa	0	4

==== Section 7 ====
First round
7	(Italy) M Trevisan	2	6	6
(France) D Parry	6	3	1
(Greece) V Grammatikopoulou	6	6
(Spain) N Párrizas Díaz	4	1
(United States) R Anderson	7^{7}	6
(Serbia) D Radanović	6^{4}	4
(Bulgaria) E Kostova	5	6	3
31	(Italy) M Di Giuseppe	7	3	6
24	(Slovakia) AK Schmiedlová	6	6
(Russia) S Lansere	2	2
(Romania) A Cadanțu	2	6	6
(United States) J Loeb	6	1	1
(Latvia) D Marcinkēviča	3	6	6
(Serbia) J Jović	6	3	4
(France) T Andrianjafitrimo	2	2
11	(Romania) J Cristian	6	6

Second round
7	(Italy) M Trevisan	2	1
(Greece) V Grammatikopoulou	6	6
(United States) R Anderson	6	6
31	(Italy) M Di Giuseppe	4	3
24	(Slovakia) AK Schmiedlová	7^{7}	3
(Romania) A Cadanțu	6^{4}	2^{r}
(Latvia) D Marcinkēviča	2	2
11	(Romania) J Cristian	6	6

Third round
(Greece) V Grammatikopoulou	3	6	6
(United States) R Anderson	6	4	3
24	(Slovakia) AK Schmiedlová	7	6
11	(Romania) J Cristian	5	2

Fourth round
(Greece) V Grammatikopoulou	3	0
24	(Slovakia) AK Schmiedlová	6	6

==== Section 8 ====
First round
15	(Netherlands) L Pattinama Kerkhove	7^{7}	5	1
(Kazakhstan) A Danilina	6^{5}	7	6
(Turkey) P Özgen	7	6^{7}	6
(Serbia) N Kostić	5	7^{9}	4
(Spain) G García Pérez	6	3	6
(Georgia (country)) E Gorgodze	4	6	1
(Mexico) M Zacarías	3	1
19	(Serbia) O Danilović	6	6
29	(Netherlands) B Schoofs	5	6	6
(Norway) U Eikeri	7	0	4
(Germany) K Gerlach	6	6
(Czech Republic) D Šátralová	2	1
(Chile) D Seguel	6	6
(Canada) K Sebov	2	2
(Slovenia) D Jakupović	5	0
2	(Italy) E Cocciaretto	7	6

Second round
(Kazakhstan) A Danilina	1	6	0
(Turkey) P Özgen	6	3	6
(Spain) G García Pérez	7^{7}	6
19	(Serbia) O Danilović	6^{5}	4
29	(Netherlands) B Schoofs	6	6
(Germany) K Gerlach	2	0
(Chile) D Seguel	1	6^{2}
2	(Italy) E Cocciaretto	6	7^{7}

Third round
(Turkey) P Özgen	4	2
(Spain) G García Pérez	6	6
29	(Netherlands) B Schoofs	3	3
2	(Italy) E Cocciaretto	6	6

Fourth round
(Spain) G García Pérez	1	6^{2}
2	(Italy) E Cocciaretto	6	7^{7}
