= 2020 Oracle Challenger Series – Newport Beach – Women's doubles =

Newport Beach – Women's doubles
- 2020 Oracle Challenger Series – Newport Beach

Final
- Champions: (United States) Hayley Carter (Brazil) Luisa Stefani
- Runners-up: (Belgium) Marie Benoît (France) Jessika Ponchet
- Score: 6–1, 6–3

Events
Singles	men	women
Doubles	men	women
← 2019 ·	Oracle Challenger Series – Newport Beach	· 2021 →

Hayley Carter and Ena Shibahara were the defending champions, but Shibahara chose not to participate this year.

Carter played alongside Luisa Stefani and successfully defended the title, defeating Marie Benoît and Jessika Ponchet in the final, 6–1, 6–3.

== Seeds ==
1. (United States) Hayley Carter / (Brazil) Luisa Stefani (champions)
2. (Mexico) Giuliana Olmos / (United States) Sabrina Santamaria (quarterfinals)
3. (Belarus) Lidziya Marozava / (United States) Maria Sanchez (first round)
4. (United States) Christina McHale / (Russia) Valeria Savinykh (semifinals)

== Draw ==
=== Key ===
- Q = Qualifier
- WC = Wild card
- LL = Lucky loser
- Alt = Alternate
- SE = Special exempt
- PR = Protected ranking
- ITF = ITF entry
- JE = Junior exempt
- w/o = Walkover
- r = Retired
- d = Defaulted
- SR = Special ranking

=== Draw ===
First round
1	(United States) H Carter (Brazil) L Stefani	6	6^{4}	[10]
(Canada) S Fichman (United States) S Rogers	2	7^{7}	[7]
(Kazakhstan) A Danilina (United States) I Neel	6	7^{7}
(Brazil) L Pigossi (Netherlands) R van der Hoek	3	6^{4}
3	(Belarus) L Marozava (United States) M Sanchez	3	7^{7}	[5]
(Hungary) D Gálfi (France) A Hesse	6	6^{4}	[10]
(Japan) E Hozumi (Japan) M Yonehara	7	6
(United States) UM Arconada (United States) J Loeb	5	2
(United States) J Cako (United States) Q Gleason	2	3
(Indonesia) B Gumulya (Indonesia) J Rompies	6	6
WC	(United States) F Di Lorenzo (United States) C Harrison	6	1	[4]
4	(United States) C McHale (Russia) V Savinykh	2	6	[10]
Alt	(Belgium) M Benoît (France) J Ponchet	6	7^{7}
(Hong Kong) E Chong (Indonesia) A Sutjiadi	4	6^{5}
(Chinese Taipei) C-y Hsu (Mexico) M Zacarías	5	1
2	(Mexico) G Olmos (United States) S Santamaria	7	6

Quarterfinals
1	(United States) H Carter (Brazil) L Stefani	6	7
(Kazakhstan) A Danilina (United States) I Neel	0	5
(Hungary) D Gálfi (France) A Hesse	6^{4}	6	[3]
(Japan) E Hozumi (Japan) M Yonehara	7^{7}	0	[10]
(Indonesia) B Gumulya (Indonesia) J Rompies	6	4	[13]
4	(United States) C McHale (Russia) V Savinykh	3	6	[15]
Alt	(Belgium) M Benoît (France) J Ponchet	6	6
2	(Mexico) G Olmos (United States) S Santamaria	2	1

Semifinals
1	(United States) H Carter (Brazil) L Stefani	6	6
(Japan) E Hozumi (Japan) M Yonehara	2	3
4	(United States) C McHale (Russia) V Savinykh	6^{3}	4
Alt	(Belgium) M Benoît (France) J Ponchet	7^{7}	6

Final
1	(United States) H Carter (Brazil) L Stefani	6	6
Alt	(Belgium) M Benoît (France) J Ponchet	1	3
