= 2020 Oracle Challenger Series – Newport Beach =

- Date: January 27–February 2
- Edition: 3rd
- Category: ATP Challenger Tour; WTA 125K series
- Draw: 48S / 16D
- Prize money: $162,480+H (ATP) $162,480 (WTA)
- Surface: Hard, outdoor
- Location: Newport Beach, California, United States
- Venue: Newport Beach Tennis Club

Champions

Men's singles
- (United States) Thai-Son Kwiatkowski

Women's singles
- (United States) Madison Brengle

Men's doubles
- (Uruguay) Ariel Behar / (Ecuador) Gonzalo Escobar

Women's doubles
- (United States) Hayley Carter / (Brazil) Luisa Stefani
- Oracle Challenger Series – Newport Beach

The 2020 Oracle Challenger Series – Newport Beach was a professional tennis tournament played on outdoor hard courts. It was the third edition of the tournament, which was part of the 2020 ATP Challenger Tour and the 2020 WTA 125K series. It took place from January 27 – February 2, 2020 at the Newport Beach Tennis Club in Newport Beach, California, United States.

== Point distribution ==
Event	W	F	SF	QF	Round of 16	Round of 32	Round of 48	Q	Q1
Men's singles	125	75	45	25	10	5	0	0	0
Men's doubles	125	75	45	25	0	—N/a	—N/a	—N/a	—N/a
Women's singles	160	95	57	29	15	8	1	4	1
Women's doubles	160	95	57	29	1	—N/a	—N/a	—N/a	—N/a

== Men's singles main-draw entrants ==
=== Seeds ===
Country	Player	Rank^{1}	Seed
USA	Taylor Fritz	34	1
USA	Frances Tiafoe	50	2
SRB	Miomir Kecmanović	54	3
USA	Steve Johnson	75	4
ITA	Andreas Seppi	85	5
CAN	Brayden Schnur	103	6
USA	Marcos Giron	107	7
TPE	Jason Jung	126	8
USA	Mackenzie McDonald	129	9
USA	Bradley Klahn	132	10
ECU	Emilio Gómez	148	11
ROU	Marius Copil	152	12
USA	Mitchell Krueger	164	13
GER	Rudolf Molleker	165	14
UZB	Denis Istomin	170	15
CAN	Peter Polansky	180	16

- ^{1} Rankings are as of 20 January 2020.

=== Other entrants ===
The following players received wildcards into the singles main draw:

- (United States) Ulises Blanch
- (United States) Taylor Fritz
- (United States) Govind Nanda
- (United States) Michael Redlicki
- (United States) Frances Tiafoe

The following player received entry into the singles main draw using a protected ranking:

- (United States) Raymond Sarmiento

The following players received entry from the qualifying draw:

- (United States) Alexander Sarkissian
- (Argentina) Agustín Velotti

== Women's singles main-draw entrants ==
=== Seeds ===
Country	Player	Rank^{1}	Seed
USA	Jessica Pegula	66	1
USA	Taylor Townsend	79	2
USA	Christina McHale	84	3
GER	Tatjana Maria	87	4
USA	Madison Brengle	95	5
SUI	Stefanie Vögele	117	6
USA	Francesca Di Lorenzo	122	7
USA	Nicole Gibbs	124	8
USA	Usue Maitane Arconada	131	9
USA	Allie Kiick	138	10
PAR	Verónica Cepede Royg	146	11
BEL	Yanina Wickmayer	147	12
USA	Shelby Rogers	155	13
UKR	Anhelina Kalinina	157	14
USA	Robin Anderson	161	15
USA	Varvara Lepchenko	166	16

- ^{1} Rankings are as of 20 January 2020.

=== Other entrants ===
The following players received wildcards into the singles main draw:

- (United States) Kayla Day
- (United States) Allie Kiick
- (United States) Katie Volynets
- (United States) Sophia Whittle

The following player received entry using a protected ranking into the singles main draw:

- (United States) Irina Falconi

The following players received entry from the qualifying draw:

- (United States) Quinn Gleason
- (Japan) Eri Hozumi

=== Retirements ===
- (Belgium) Yanina Wickmayer (lower back injury)

== Women's doubles main-draw entrants ==
=== Seeds ===
Country	Player	Country	Player	Rank^{1}	Seed
USA	Hayley Carter	BRA	Luisa Stefani	134	1
MEX	Giuliana Olmos	USA	Sabrina Santamaria	153	2
BLR	Lidziya Marozava	USA	Maria Sanchez	193	3
USA	Christina McHale	RUS	Valeria Savinykh	264	4

- ^{1} Rankings as of 20 January 2020

=== Other entrants ===
The following pair received a wildcard into the doubles main draw:

- (United States) Francesca Di Lorenzo / (United States) Catherine Harrison

The following pair received entry as alternates:

- (Belgium) Marie Benoît / (France) Jessika Ponchet

=== Withdrawals ===
Before the tournament

- (Belgium) Yanina Wickmayer (lower back injury)

== Champions ==
=== Men's singles ===
- (United States) Thai-Son Kwiatkowski def. (Colombia) Daniel Elahi Galán 6–4, 6–1.

=== Women's singles ===
- (United States) Madison Brengle def. (Switzerland) Stefanie Vögele, 6–1, 3–6, 6–2

=== Men's doubles ===
- (Uruguay) Ariel Behar / (Ecuador) Gonzalo Escobar def. (Croatia) Antonio Šančić / (Austria) Tristan-Samuel Weissborn 6–2, 6–4.

=== Women's doubles ===
- (United States) Hayley Carter / (Brazil) Luisa Stefani def. (Belgium) Marie Benoît / (France) Jessika Ponchet, 6–1, 6–3
