= 2020 TK Sparta Prague Open =

- Date: 29 August – 6 September
- Edition: 1st
- Category: WTA 125s
- Prize money: $3,125,000
- Surface: Clay
- Location: Prague, Czech Republic
- Venue: TK Sparta Prague; I.ČLTK (few)

Champions

Singles
- (Slovakia) Kristína Kučová

Doubles
- (Belarus) Lidziya Marozava / (Romania) Andreea Mitu
- TK Sparta Prague Open

The 2020 TK Sparta Prague Open was a professional tennis tournament played on outdoor clay courts. It was part of the 2020 WTA 125K series. It took place in Prague, Czech Republic between 29 August – 6 September 2020.

The tournament draw size was increased from 32 to 128 (and hence, the prize money and ranking points offered increased, as well). This was done to allow players unable to participate in the US Open qualifying to compete, which was cancelled due to the ongoing COVID-19 pandemic. along with the last minute cancellation of a concurrent tournament in Austria. Due to the overwhelming size of participants, the event scheduled to be held only on TK Sparta Praha had to have make use also of nearby I. Czech Lawn Tennis Club on the Stvanice Island.

== WTA singles main-draw entrants ==
=== Seeds ===
Country	Player	Rank^{1}	Seed
ROU	Monica Niculescu	138	1
ITA	Elisabetta Cocciaretto	144	2
GBR	Harriet Dart	147	3
SUI	Leonie Küng	148	4
ESP	Lara Arruabarrena	150	5
ITA	Sara Errani	151	6
ITA	Martina Trevisan	153	7
ITA	Giulia Gatto-Monticone	156	8
POL	Magdalena Fręch	158	9
ROU	Irina Bara	161	10
ROU	Jaqueline Cristian	164	11
ARG	Nadia Podoroska	165	12
IND	Ankita Raina	166	13
SVK	Jana Čepelová	167	14
NED	Lesley Pattinama Kerkhove	168	15
ROU	Elena-Gabriela Ruse	169	16
EGY	Mayar Sherif	170	17
SVK	Kristína Kučová	173	18
SRB	Olga Danilović	174	19
FRA	Chloé Paquet	175	20
ESP	Cristina Bucșa	177	21
USA	Varvara Lepchenko	179	22
GBR	Samantha Murray Sharan	180	23
SVK	Anna Karolína Schmiedlová	181	24
NED	Indy de Vroome	183	25
GEO	Mariam Bolkvadze	184	26
TUR	Çağla Büyükakçay	185	27
BUL	Isabella Shinikova	187	28
NED	Bibiane Schoofs	188	29
MEX	Renata Zarazúa	189	30
ITA	Martina Di Giuseppe	191	31
SVK	Rebecca Šramková	193	32

- ^{1} Rankings are as of 17 August 2020.

=== Other entrants ===
The following players received wildcards into the singles main draw:

- (Czech Republic) Nikola Bartůňková
- (Czech Republic) Sára Bejlek
- (Czech Republic) Linda Fruhvirtová
- (Czech Republic) Lucie Havlíčková
- (Czech Republic) Kristýna Lavičková
- (Czech Republic) Linda Nosková
- (Czech Republic) Barbora Palicová
- (Czech Republic) Darja Viďmanová

The following players received entry into the singles main draw using a protected ranking:

- (Turkey) Başak Eraydın
- (Czech Republic) Miriam Kolodziejová
- (Germany) Sabine Lisicki
- (Ukraine) Daria Lopatetska

The following players received entry as an alternate:

- (Australia) Ivana Popovic

=== Withdrawals ===
- (United Kingdom) Naiktha Bains → replaced by (Canada) Eugenie Bouchard
- (Paraguay) Verónica Cepede Royg → replaced by (North Macedonia) Lina Gjorcheska
- (United States) Alexa Glatch → replaced by (Sweden) Mirjam Björklund
- (Ukraine) Anhelina Kalinina → replaced by (Hungary) Panna Udvardy
- (Ukraine) Marta Kostyuk → replaced by (United Kingdom) Amanda Carreras
- (United States) Claire Liu → replaced by (Spain) Andrea Lázaro García
- (Czech Republic) Jesika Malečková → replaced by (Australia) Ivana Popovic
- (Luxembourg) Mandy Minella → replaced by (Spain) Irene Burillo Escorihuela
- (Australia) Ellen Perez → replaced by (Mexico) Ana Sofía Sánchez
- (Russia) Kamilla Rakhimova → replaced by (India) Riya Bhatia
- (Australia) Arina Rodionova → replaced by (Belgium) Maryna Zanevska
- (Australia) Storm Sanders → replaced by (United Kingdom) Francesca Jones
- (Belgium) Yanina Wickmayer → replaced by (United States) Katie Volynets

== WTA doubles main-draw entrants ==
=== Seeds ===
Country	Player	Country	Player	Rank^{1}	Seed
ROU	Monica Niculescu	CZE	Renata Voráčová	110	1
ESP	Lara Arruabarrena	SLO	Katarina Srebotnik	158	2
ESP	Georgina García Pérez	HUN	Fanny Stollár	167	3
NED	Bibiane Schoofs	NED	Rosalie van der Hoek	202	4
SLO	Dalila Jakupović	RUS	Valeria Savinykh	217	5
KAZ	Anna Danilina	RUS	Yana Sizikova	218	6
BLR	Lidziya Marozava	ROU	Andreea Mitu	235	7
ROU	Laura Ioana Paar	GER	Julia Wachaczyk	239	8

- ^{1} Rankings as of 17 August 2020

== Champions ==
=== Singles ===
- (Slovakia) Kristína Kučová def. (Italy) Elisabetta Cocciaretto 6–4, 6–3

=== Doubles ===
- (Belarus) Lidziya Marozava / (Romania) Andreea Mitu def. (Italy) Giulia Gatto-Monticone / (Argentina) Nadia Podoroska 6–4, 6–4
