= 2020 TK Sparta Prague Open – Doubles =

Doubles
- 2020 TK Sparta Prague Open

Final
- Champion: (Belarus) Lidziya Marozava (Romania) Andreea Mitu
- Runner-up: (Italy) Giulia Gatto-Monticone (Argentina) Nadia Podoroska
- Score: 6–4, 6–4

Events
| Singles | Doubles |
| TK Sparta Prague Open |

The 2020 TK Sparta Prague Open was a women's tennis tournament played on Clay in Prague, Czech Republic, and was part of the 2020 WTA 125K series.

This was the first edition of the tournament and was held from 29 August to 6 September 2020.

Lidziya Marozava and Andreea Mitu won the title, defeating Giulia Gatto-Monticone and Nadia Podoroska in the final, 6–4, 6–4.

== Seeds ==
1. (Romania) Monica Niculescu / (Czech Republic) Renata Voráčová (second round)
2. (Spain) Lara Arruabarrena / (Slovenia) Katarina Srebotnik (second round)
3. (Spain) Georgina García Pérez / (Hungary) Fanny Stollár (second round)
4. (Netherlands) Bibiane Schoofs / (Netherlands) Rosalie van der Hoek (second round)
5. (Slovenia) Dalila Jakupović / (Russia) Valeria Savinykh (first round)
6. (Kazakhstan) Anna Danilina / (Russia) Yana Sizikova (second round)
7. (Belarus) Lidziya Marozava / (Romania) Andreea Mitu (champions)
8. (Romania) Laura Ioana Paar / (Germany) Julia Wachaczyk (second round)

== Draw ==
=== Key ===
- Q = Qualifier
- WC = Wild card
- LL = Lucky loser
- Alt = Alternate
- SE = Special exempt
- PR = Protected ranking
- ITF = ITF entry
- JE = Junior exempt
- w/o = Walkover
- r = Retired
- d = Defaulted
- SR = Special ranking

=== Finals ===
Semifinals
(Switzerland) Leonie Küng (Egypt) Mayar Sherif | 6 | 3 | [5]
7 | (Belarus) Lidziya Marozava (Romania) Andreea Mitu | 2 | 6 | [10]
(Italy) Giulia Gatto-Monticone (Argentina) Nadia Podoroska | 2 | 6 | [10]
(United Kingdom) Harriet Dart (Sweden) Cornelia Lister | 6 | 4 | [8]

Final
7 | (Belarus) Lidziya Marozava (Romania) Andreea Mitu | 6 | 6
(Italy) Giulia Gatto-Monticone (Argentina) Nadia Podoroska | 4 | 4

=== Top half ===
First round
1 | (Romania) M Niculescu (Czech Republic) R Voráčová | 6 | 7
(Italy) E Cocciaretto (Italy) M Trevisan | 0 | 5
(Switzerland) L Küng (Egypt) M Sherif | 6 | 6
(France) A Hesse (Mexico) V Rodríguez | 2 | 0
(Czech Republic) A Dețiuc (Czech Republic) J Marková | 6 | 6
(Russia) A Anshba (Russia) E Yashina | 1 | 1
(Romania) G Talabă (Mexico) M Zacarías | 6 | 4 | [8]
6 | (Kazakhstan) A Danilina (Russia) Y Sizikova | 4 | 6 | [10]
4 | (Netherlands) B Schoofs (Netherlands) R van der Hoek | 6 | 6
(United Kingdom) S Murray Sharan (India) A Raina | 1 | 2
(Hungary) A Bondár (Slovakia) T Mihalíková | 6 | 2 | [10]
(United States) I Neel (New Zealand) E Routliffe | 1 | 6 | [7]
(Poland) P Kania (Poland) K Piter | 6 | 6
(Romania) J Cristian (Romania) E-G Ruse | 4 | 2
(Norway) U Eikeri (United States) C Harrison | 6 | 6^{3} | [3]
7 | (Belarus) L Marozava (Romania) A Mitu | 4 | 7^{7} | [10]

Second round
1 | (Romania) M Niculescu (Czech Republic) R Voráčová | 6 | 3 | [9]
(Switzerland) L Küng (Egypt) M Sherif | 0 | 6 | [11]
(Czech Republic) A Dețiuc (Czech Republic) J Marková | 6 | 6
6 | (Kazakhstan) A Danilina (Russia) Y Sizikova | 1 | 2
4 | (Netherlands) B Schoofs (Netherlands) R van der Hoek | 4 | 1
(Hungary) A Bondár (Slovakia) T Mihalíková | 6 | 6
(Poland) P Kania (Poland) K Piter | 6 | 4 | [8]
7 | (Belarus) L Marozava (Romania) A Mitu | 4 | 6 | [10]

Quarterfinals
(Switzerland) L Küng (Egypt) M Sherif | 1 | 6 | [10]
(Czech Republic) A Dețiuc (Czech Republic) J Marková | 6 | 3 | [7]
(Hungary) A Bondár (Slovakia) T Mihalíková | 4 | 4
7 | (Belarus) L Marozava (Romania) A Mitu | 6 | 6

Semifinals
(Switzerland) L Küng (Egypt) M Sherif | 6 | 3 | [5]
7 | (Belarus) L Marozava (Romania) A Mitu | 2 | 6 | [10]

=== Bottom half ===
First round
5 | (Slovenia) D Jakupović (Russia) V Savinykh | 2 | 3
(Slovakia) J Čepelová (Italy) S Errani | 6 | 6
(Hungary) D Gálfi (Belgium) K Zimmermann | 6 | 4 | [10]
(United States) R Anderson (United States) J Loeb | 4 | 6 | [6]
(France) E Lechemia (France) J Ponchet | 3 | 4
(Italy) G Gatto-Monticone (Argentina) N Podoroska | 6 | 6
(Romania) I Bara (Hungary) RL Jani | 2 | 5
3 | (Spain) G García Pérez (Hungary) F Stollár | 6 | 7
8 | (Romania) LI Paar (Germany) J Wachaczyk | 6 | 7
(Germany) V Heisen (United Kingdom) E Webley-Smith | 4 | 5
(Georgia (country)) E Gorgodze (Georgia (country)) S Shapatava | 7 | 7^{7}
(United Kingdom) SB Grey (United Kingdom) E Silva | 5 | 6^{5}
(Romania) C Dinu (Brazil) L Pigossi | 2 | 7^{7} | [2]
(United Kingdom) H Dart (Sweden) C Lister | 6 | 6^{5} | [10]
(Netherlands) R Hogenkamp (Netherlands) L Pattinama Kerkhove | 6 | 1 | [5]
2 | (Spain) L Arruabarrena (Slovenia) K Srebotnik | 4 | 6 | [10]

Second round
(Slovakia) J Čepelová (Italy) S Errani | 6 | 1 | [10]
(Hungary) D Gálfi (Belgium) K Zimmermann | 4 | 6 | [12]
(Italy) G Gatto-Monticone (Argentina) N Podoroska | 5 | 6 | [10]
3 | (Spain) G García Pérez (Hungary) F Stollár | 7 | 4 | [2]
8 | (Romania) LI Paar (Germany) J Wachaczyk | 4 | 6 | [8]
(Georgia (country)) E Gorgodze (Georgia (country)) S Shapatava | 6 | 3 | [10]
(United Kingdom) H Dart (Sweden) C Lister | 6 | 6
2 | (Spain) L Arruabarrena (Slovenia) K Srebotnik | 3 | 3

Quarterfinals
(Hungary) D Gálfi (Belgium) K Zimmermann | 5 | 6 | [8]
(Italy) G Gatto-Monticone (Argentina) N Podoroska | 7 | 3 | [10]
(Georgia (country)) E Gorgodze (Georgia (country)) S Shapatava | 4 | 1
(United Kingdom) H Dart (Sweden) C Lister | 6 | 6

Semifinals
(Italy) G Gatto-Monticone (Argentina) N Podoroska | 2 | 6 | [10]
(United Kingdom) H Dart (Sweden) C Lister | 6 | 4 | [8]
