= 2020 Oracle Challenger Series – Newport Beach – Women's singles =

Newport Beach – Women's singles
- 2020 Oracle Challenger Series – Newport Beach

Final
- Champion: (United States) Madison Brengle
- Runner-up: (Switzerland) Stefanie Vögele
- Score: 6–1, 3–6, 6–2

Events
Singles	men	women
Doubles	men	women
← 2019 ·	Oracle Challenger Series – Newport Beach	· 2021 →

Bianca Andreescu was the defending champion, but chose not to participate this year.

Madison Brengle won the title, defeating Stefanie Vögele in the final, 6–1, 3–6, 6–2.

== Seeds ==
All seeds received a bye into the second round.

1. (United States) Jessica Pegula (quarterfinals)
2. (United States) Taylor Townsend (semifinals)
3. (United States) Christina McHale (quarterfinals)
4. (Germany) Tatjana Maria (quarterfinals)
5. (United States) Madison Brengle (champion)
6. (Switzerland) Stefanie Vögele (final)
7. (United States) Francesca Di Lorenzo (second round)
8. (United States) Nicole Gibbs (third round)

9. (United States) Usue Maitane Arconada (second round)
10. (United States) Allie Kiick (second round)
11. (Paraguay) Verónica Cepede Royg (third round)
12. (Belgium) Yanina Wickmayer (third round, retired)
13. (United States) Shelby Rogers (third round)
14. (Ukraine) Anhelina Kalinina (third round)
15. (United States) Robin Anderson (second round)
16. (United States) Varvara Lepchenko (second round)

Click on the seed number of a player to go to their draw section.

== Draw ==
=== Key ===
- Q = Qualifier
- WC = Wild card
- LL = Lucky loser
- Alt = Alternate
- SE = Special exempt
- PR = Protected ranking
- ITF = ITF entry
- JE = Junior exempt
- w/o = Walkover
- r = Retired
- d = Defaulted
- SR = Special ranking

=== Finals ===
Quarterfinals
1	(United States) Jessica Pegula	6	6^{7}	2
5	(United States) Madison Brengle	1	7^{9}	6
4	(Germany) Tatjana Maria	6	1	1
(Argentina) Nadia Podoroska	2	6	6
6	(Switzerland) Stefanie Vögele	6	1	6
3	(United States) Christina McHale	1	6	4
(United States) CoCo Vandeweghe	6	1	1
2	(United States) Taylor Townsend	1	6	6

Semifinals
5	(United States) Madison Brengle	6	7^{7}
(Argentina) Nadia Podoroska	4	6^{5}
6	(Switzerland) Stefanie Vögele	6	6
2	(United States) Taylor Townsend	2	3

Final
5	(United States) Madison Brengle	6	3	6
6	(Switzerland) Stefanie Vögele	1	6	2

=== Top half ===
==== Section 1 ====
First round
(Italy) S Errani	6	6
(Mexico) M Zacarías	1	2
(Hungary) D Gálfi	5	6	6
(Canada) K Sebov	7	2	4
(United States) J Loeb	4	2
(United States) C Liu	6	6
(Japan) M Hibi	6	2	6
(Croatia) T Mrdeža	1	6	3

Second round
1	(United States) J Pegula	6	6
(Italy) S Errani	1	1
(Hungary) D Gálfi	6	6
16	(United States) V Lepchenko	4	4
12	(Belgium) Y Wickmayer	6	6
(United States) C Liu	1	3
(Japan) M Hibi	1	5
5	(United States) M Brengle	6	7

Third round
1	(United States) J Pegula	6	3	6
(Hungary) D Gálfi	2	6	1
12	(Belgium) Y Wickmayer	2	0^{r}
5	(United States) M Brengle	6	3

Quarterfinals
1	(United States) J Pegula	6	6^{7}	2
5	(United States) M Brengle	1	7^{9}	6

==== Section 2 ====
First round
(United States) C Harrison	4	5
(France) A Hesse	6	7
(Canada) E Bouchard	1	2
(United States) A Glatch	6	6
Q	(United States) Q Gleason	7^{7}	7^{7}
(Belgium) M Benoît	6^{4}	6^{4}
(Argentina) N Podoroska	6	6
(Brazil) G Cé	3	2

Second round
4	(Germany) T Maria	6	6
(France) A Hesse	2	3
(United States) A Glatch	0	4
13	(United States) S Rogers	6	6
11	(Paraguay) V Cepede Royg	7	2	6
Q	(United States) Q Gleason	5	6	2
(Argentina) N Podoroska	6	4	6
7	(United States) F Di Lorenzo	3	6	4

Third round
4	(Germany) T Maria	7	6
13	(United States) S Rogers	5	4
11	(Paraguay) V Cepede Royg	0	6	3
(Argentina) N Podoroska	6	3	6

Quarterfinals
4	(Germany) T Maria	6	1	1
(Argentina) N Podoroska	2	6	6

=== Bottom half ===
==== Section 3 ====
First round
(United States) H Chang	6^{3}	6	6
Q	(Japan) E Hozumi	7^{7}	4	4
(Mexico) R Zarazúa	5	6^{4}
PR	(United States) I Falconi	7	7^{7}
WC	(United States) S Whittle	6	6
(Kazakhstan) A Danilina	2	2
WC	(United States) K Volynets	3	5
(United States) G Min	6	7

Second round
6	(Switzerland) S Vögele	6	6
(United States) H Chang	4	3
PR	(United States) I Falconi	7^{7}	6
9	(United States) UM Arconada	6^{5}	1
15	(United States) R Anderson	3	0
WC	(United States) S Whittle	6	6
(United States) G Min	5	4
3	(United States) C McHale	7	6

Third round
6	(Switzerland) S Vögele	6	6
PR	(United States) I Falconi	1	1
WC	(United States) S Whittle	4	3
3	(United States) C McHale	6	6

Quarterfinals
6	(Switzerland) S Vögele	6	1	6
3	(United States) C McHale	1	6	4

==== Section 4 ====
First round
WC	(United States) K Day	6	4	3
(United States) H Baptiste	4	6	6
(United States) C Vandeweghe	6	6
(Colombia) C Osorio	4	1
(France) J Ponchet	6	6
(Latvia) D Marcinkēviča	3	2
(Mexico) AS Sánchez	6	5	6
(Serbia) J Jović	4	7	4

Second round
8	(United States) N Gibbs	6	6
(United States) H Baptiste	4	4
(United States) C Vandeweghe	6	6
10/WC	(United States) A Kiick	2	1
14	(Ukraine) A Kalinina	3	6	6
(France) J Ponchet	6	3	2
(Mexico) AS Sánchez	2	4
2	(United States) T Townsend	6	6

Third round
8	(United States) N Gibbs	5	4
(United States) C Vandeweghe	7	6
14	(Ukraine) A Kalinina	3	1
2	(United States) T Townsend	6	6

Quarterfinals
(United States) C Vandeweghe	6	1	1
2	(United States) T Townsend	1	6	6

== Qualifying ==
=== Seeds ===
1. (Japan) Eri Hozumi (qualified)
2. (United States) Quinn Gleason (qualified)

=== Qualifiers ===
1. (Japan) Eri Hozumi
2. (United States) Quinn Gleason

=== Draw ===
==== First qualifier ====
Qualifying competition
1	(Japan) Eri Hozumi	6	6^{2}	6
	(United States) Ashley Kratzer	4	7^{7}	1

==== Second qualifier ====
Qualifying competition
2	(United States) Quinn Gleason	6^{4}	7	7
	(United States) Maegan Manasse	7^{7}	5	5
