= Hayley Carter =

American tennis player (born 1995)

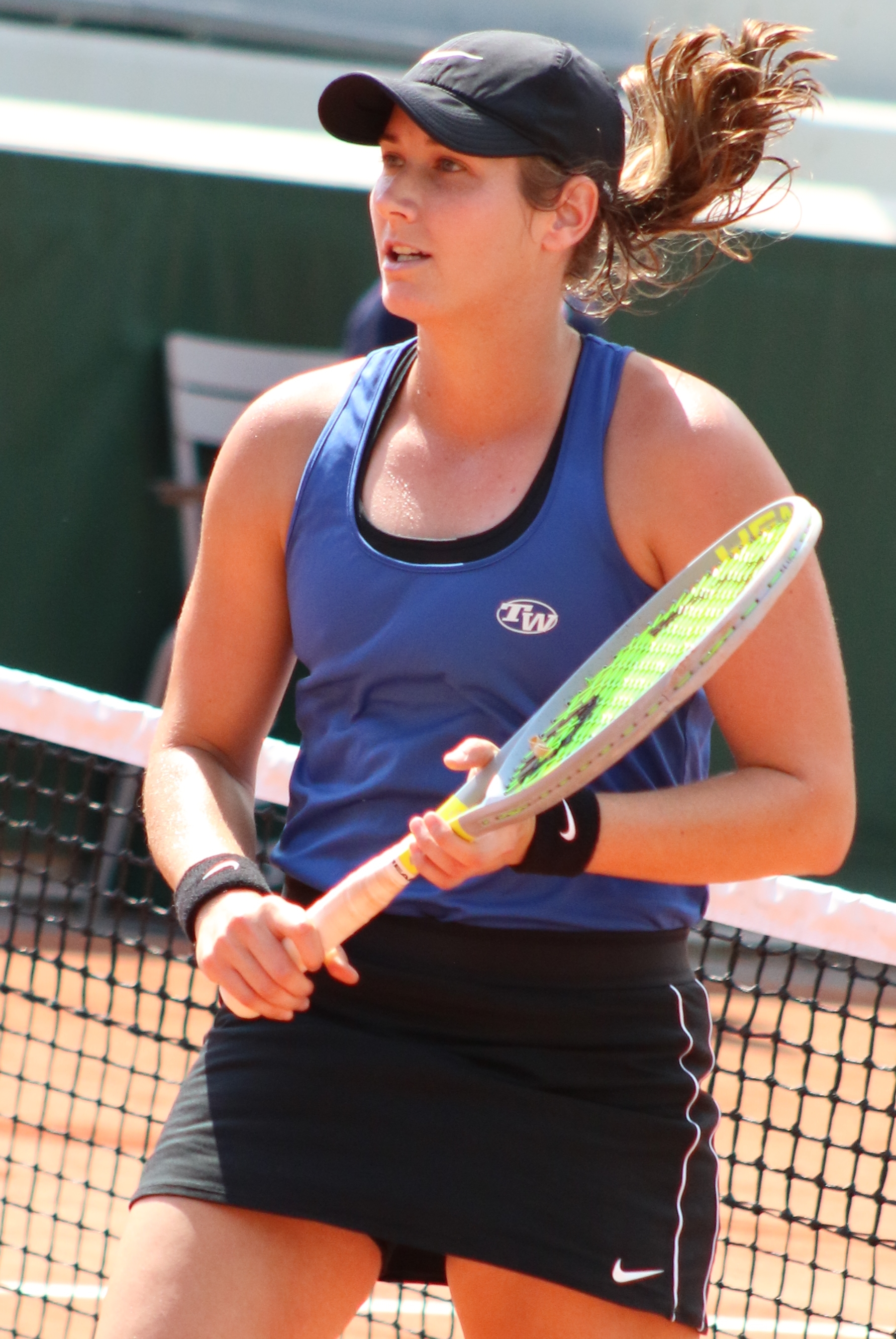
- Carter at the 2021 French Open
- Full name: Hayley Nicole Carter
- Country (sports): United States
- Born: May 17, 1995 (age 31) Chattanooga, Tennessee, U.S.
- Height: 5 ft 11 in (1.80 m)
- Turned pro: 2012
- Plays: Right-handed (two-handed backhand)
- College: University of North Carolina
- Prize money: $353,552

Singles
- Career record: 62–44
- Career titles: 0
- Highest ranking: No. 438 (July 29, 2019)

Doubles
- Career record: 124–56
- Career titles: 2 WTA, 2 WTA 125
- Highest ranking: No. 25 (June 14, 2021)

Grand Slam doubles results
- Australian Open: 3R (2020, 2021)
- French Open: 3R (2020)
- Wimbledon: 1R (2021)
- US Open: QF (2020)

Grand Slam mixed doubles results
- Australian Open: QF (2021)
- Wimbledon: 3R (2021)
- US Open: 1R (2021)

Hayley Nicole Carter (born May 17, 1995) is an American former professional tennis player. She has a career-high WTA doubles ranking of No. 25, which she achieved on 14 June 2021. Primarily a doubles player, Carter won over her career two WTA Tour and two WTA 125 doubles titles, with nine titles on the ITF Women's Circuit.

== Junior years ==
Carter played at the Smith Stearn's Tennis Academy growing up. She also won a record 14 South Carolina state championships. Between 2009 and 2012, she won three ITF Junior Circuit singles titles and one doubles title.

Carter played collegiate tennis for the North Carolina Tar Heels, where she earned All-American honors each of the four years she competed. She is the Atlantic Coast Conference's all-time leader in women's tennis singles victories with 168.

== Professional ==
=== 2019: New partnership with Stefani, first WTA Tour title ===
In September 2019, with Luisa Stefani as partner, she reached her first doubles final on the WTA Tour at the Korea Open, and the following week, they won their first WTA Tour title at the Tashkent Open. Thereafter, Carter established a fixed partnership with Stefani.

=== 2020: Top 40 debut ===
The Carter/Stefani duo reached the third round for the first time at a major at the 2020 Australian Open where they were defeated by sixth seeded duo Gabriela Dabrowski/Jeļena Ostapenko.

They won the title at the Newport Beach Challenger, which was the second year in a row that Carter had won this event (with Ena Shibahara in 2019). They also reached the Dubai Tennis Championships quarterfinals in February, and won the Lexington Open in August. With that, they entered the top 40 for the first time.

At the Italian Open, they had another great tournament reaching the semifinals and losing only to the top seeds Hsieh/Strycová.

The pair's best result at a major championship came at the US Open where they reached the quarterfinals, defeating the No. 6 seeds, Japan duo of Shuko Aoyama and Ena Shibahara, in the round of 16.

=== 2021: WTA 1000 doubles final and top 25, coaching ===
Carter reached her best result at the WTA 1000-level by becoming a doubles finalist alongside Stefani in Miami, where they were defeated by the fifth-seeded duo Aoyama/Shibahara. Following Wimbledon, she joined the coaching staff of the Vanderbilt Commodores college team in July 2021. Through the rest of the year, she took part in three WTA tournaments in the US: the Cincinnati Open with Sabrina Santamaria, the US Open with Astra Sharma, and Indian Wells Open with Dabrowski.

=== 2023 ===
Carter returned to the University of North Carolina as an assistant coach in July 2023.

== Grand Slam performance timelines ==
Key
W	F	SF	QF	#R	RR	Q#	P#	DNQ	A	Z#	PO	G	S	B	NMS	NTI	P	NH

(W) winner; (F) finalist; (SF) semifinalist; (QF) quarterfinalist; (#R) rounds 4, 3, 2, 1; (RR) round-robin stage; (Q#) qualification round; (P#) preliminary round; (DNQ) did not qualify; (A) absent; (Z#) Davis/Fed Cup Zonal Group (with number indication) or (PO) play-off; (G) gold, (S) silver or (B) bronze Olympic/Paralympic medal; (NMS) not a Masters tournament; (NTI) not a Tier I tournament; (P) postponed; (NH) not held; (SR) strike rate (events won / competed); (W–L) win–loss record.
To avoid confusion and double counting, these charts are updated at the conclusion of a tournament or when the player's participation has ended.

=== Women's doubles ===
Tournament	2019	2020	2021	SR	W–L
Australian Open	A	3R	3R	0 / 2	4–2
French Open	A	3R	1R	0 / 2	2–2
Wimbledon	A	NH	1R	0 / 1	0–1
US Open	1R	QF	1R	0 / 3	3–3
Win–Loss	0–1	7–3	2–4	0 / 8	9–8

=== Mixed doubles ===
Tournament	2019	2020	2021	SR	W–L
Australian Open	A	A	QF	0 / 1	2–1
French Open	A	NH	A	0 / 0	0–0
Wimbledon	A	NH	3R	0 / 1	1–1
US Open	2R	NH	1R	0 / 2	1–2
Win–Loss	1–1	0–0	3–3	0 / 4	4–4

== Significant finals ==
=== WTA 1000 tournaments ===
==== Doubles: 1 (runner-up) ====
Result	Date	Tournament	Surface	Partner	Opponents	Score
Loss	2021	Miami Open	Hard	(Brazil) Luisa Stefani	(Japan) Shuko Aoyama (Japan) Ena Shibahara	2–6, 5–7

== WTA Tour finals ==
=== Doubles: 8 (2 titles, 6 runner-ups) ===
Legend Premier M & 5 / WTA 1000 (0–1) Premier / WTA 500 (0–2) International / WTA 250 (2–3)	Finals by surface Hard (2–4) Clay (0–2)

Result	W–L	Date	Tournament	Tier	Surface	Partner	Opponents	Score
Loss	0–1	Apr 2019	Copa Colsanitas, Colombia	International	Clay	(Japan) Ena Shibahara	(Australia) Zoe Hives (Australia) Astra Sharma	1–6, 2–6
Loss	0–2	Sep 2019	Korea Open, South Korea	International	Hard	(Brazil) Luisa Stefani	(Spain) Lara Arruabarrena (Germany) Tatjana Maria	6–7^{(7–9)}, 6–3, [7–10]
Win	1–2	Sep 2019	Tashkent Open, Uzbekistan	International	Hard	(Brazil) Luisa Stefani	(Slovenia) Dalila Jakupović (United States) Sabrina Santamaria	6–3, 7–6^{(7–4)}
Win	2–2	Aug 2020	Lexington Open, United States	International	Hard	(Brazil) Luisa Stefani	(Czech Republic) Marie Bouzková (Switzerland) Jil Teichmann	6–1, 7–5
Loss	2–3	Sep 2020	Internationaux de Strasbourg, France	International	Clay	(Brazil) Luisa Stefani	(United States) Nicole Melichar (Netherlands) Demi Schuurs	4–6, 3–6
Loss	2–4	Jan 2021	Abu Dhabi Open, United Arab Emirates	WTA 500	Hard	(Brazil) Luisa Stefani	(Japan) Shuko Aoyama (Japan) Ena Shibahara	6–7^{(5–7)}, 4–6
Loss	2–5	Feb 2021	Adelaide International, Australia	WTA 500	Hard	(Brazil) Luisa Stefani	(Chile) Alexa Guarachi (United States) Desirae Krawczyk	7–6^{(7–4)}, 4–6, [3–10]
Loss	2–6	Apr 2021	Miami Open, United States	WTA 1000	Hard	(Brazil) Luisa Stefani	(Japan) Shuko Aoyama (Japan) Ena Shibahara	2–6, 5–7

== WTA 125 finals ==
=== Doubles: 3 (2 titles, 1 runner-up) ===
Result	W–L	Date	Tournament	Surface	Partner	Opponents	Score
Win	1–0	Jan 2019	Newport Beach Challenger, United States	Hard	(Japan) Ena Shibahara	(United States) Taylor Townsend (Belgium) Yanina Wickmayer	6–3, 7–6^{(1)}
Win	2–0	Feb 2020	Newport Beach Challenger (2)	Hard	(Brazil) Luisa Stefani	(Belgium) Marie Benoît (France) Jessika Ponchet	6–1, 6–3
Loss	1–2	May 2021	Open de Saint-Malo, France	Clay	(Brazil) Luisa Stefani	(United States) Kaitlyn Christian (United States) Sabrina Santamaria	6–7^{(4)}, 6–4, [5–10]

== ITF Circuit finals ==
Legend
$60,000 tournaments
$25,000 tournaments
$10,000 tournaments

=== Singles: 2 (runner-ups) ===
Result	W–L	Date	Tournament	Tier	Surface	Opponent	Score
Loss	0–1	May 2013	ITF Hilton Head, United States	10,000	Hard	(Russia) Yana Koroleva	5–7, 4–6
Loss	0–2	Aug 2014	ITF Fort Worth, United States	10,000	Hard	(Germany) Tatjana Maria	1–6, 1–6

=== Doubles: 14 (9 titles, 5 runner-ups) ===
Result	W–L	Date	Tournament	Tier	Surface	Partner	Opponents	Score
Loss	0–1	Oct 2012	ITF Florence, United States	25,000	Hard	(United States) Brooke Austin	(Norway) Ulrikke Eikeri (Japan) Akiko Omae	1–6, 1–6
Loss	0–2	May 2013	ITF Hilton Head, United States	10,000	Hard	(United States) Josie Kuhlman	(United States) Kristy Frilling (United States) Alexandra Mueller	3–6, 4–6
Win	1–2	Jul 2014	ITF Fort Worth, United States	10,000	Hard	(Singapore) Stefanie Tan	(United States) Catherine Harrison (United States) Mary Weatherholt	6–3, 6–3
Win	2–2	Jun 2018	ITF Baton Rouge, United States	25,000	Hard	(United States) Ena Shibahara	(Australia) Astra Sharma (Romania) Gabriela Talabă	6–3, 6–4
Win	3–2	Aug 2018	Lexington Challenger, United States	60,000	Hard	(United States) Ena Shibahara	(United States) Sanaz Marand (Mexico) Victoria Rodríguez	6–3, 6–1
Loss	3–3	Sep 2018	ITF Lubbock, United States	25,000	Hard	(Montenegro) Vladica Babić	(United Kingdom) Naomi Broady (Argentina) Nadia Podoroska	6–3, 6–4
Win	4–3	Oct 2018	Stockton Challenger, United States	60,000	Hard	(United States) Ena Shibahara	(United States) Quinn Gleason (Brazil) Luisa Stefani	7–5, 5–7, [10–7]
Win	5–3	Feb 2019	Rancho Santa Fe Open, United States	25,000	Hard	(United States) Ena Shibahara	(United States) Francesca Di Lorenzo (United States) Caty McNally	7–5, 6–2
Win	6–3	Jun 2019	ITF Bethany Beach, United States	25,000	Clay	(United States) Usue Maitane Arconada	(Bosnia and Herzegovina) Dea Herdželaš (Slovakia) Tereza Mihalíková	6–4, 6–4
Loss	6–4	Jun 2019	ITF Sumter, United States	25,000	Hard	(Montenegro) Vladica Babić	(United States) Brynn Boren (United States) Caitlin Whoriskey	4–6, 4–6
Win	7–4	Jun 2019	ITF Denver, United States	25,000	Hard	(Montenegro) Vladica Babić	(United States) Brynn Boren (United States) Gail Brodsky	6–2, 6–3
Win	8–4	Jul 2019	Championships of Honolulu, United States	60,000	Hard	(United States) Jamie Loeb	(United States) Usue Maitane Arconada (United States) Caroline Dolehide	6–4, 6–4
Loss	8–5	Aug 2019	Landisville Tennis Challenge, United States	60,000	Hard	(United States) Jamie Loeb	(United States) Vania King (United States) Claire Liu	6–4, 2–6, [5–10]
Win	9–5	Nov 2019	Copa Santiago, Chile	60,000	Clay	(Brazil) Luisa Stefani	(Kazakhstan) Anna Danilina (Switzerland) Conny Perrin	5–7, 6–3, [10–6]

== World TeamTennis ==
Carter made her World TeamTennis debut in 2020.
