= Oracle Challenger Series – Newport Beach =

- 2019 Oracle Challenger Series – Newport Beach

Defunct tennis tournament
- Event name: Oracle Challenger Series – Newport Beach
- Founded: 2018
- Location: Newport Beach, California, United States
- Venue: Newport Beach Tennis Club
- Surface: Hard
- Website: oraclechallengerseries.com

Current champions (2020)
- Men's singles: (United States) Thai-Son Kwiatkowski
- Women's singles: (United States) Madison Brengle
- Men's doubles: (Uruguay) Ariel Behar (Colombia) Gonzalo Escobar
- Women's doubles: (United States) Hayley Carter (Brazil) Luisa Stefani
ATP Tour
- Category: ATP Challenger Tour
- Draw: 48S / 4Q / 16D
- Prize money: $162,480+H
WTA Tour
- Category: WTA 125K series
- Draw: 48S / 4Q / 16D
- Prize money: $162,480

The Oracle Challenger Series – Newport Beach is a professional tennis tournament played on hardcourts. It is currently part of the ATP Challenger Tour and the WTA 125 tournaments. It is held annually in Newport Beach, California, United States since 2018.

== Past finals ==
=== Men's singles ===
Year	Champion	Runner-up	Score	Ref.
2020	(United States) Thai-Son Kwiatkowski	(Colombia) Daniel Elahi Galán	6–4, 6–1	
2019	(United States) Taylor Fritz (2)	(Canada) Brayden Schnur	7–6^{(9–7)}, 6–4	
2018	(United States) Taylor Fritz	(United States) Bradley Klahn	3–6, 7–5, 6–0	

=== Women's singles ===
Year	Champion	Runner-up	Score	Ref.
2020	(United States) Madison Brengle	(Switzerland) Stefanie Vögele	6–1, 3–6, 6–2	
2019	(Canada) Bianca Andreescu	(United States) Jessica Pegula	0–6, 6–4, 6–2	
2018	(United States) Danielle Collins	(Russia) Sofya Zhuk	2–6, 6–4, 6–3	

=== Men's doubles ===
Year	Champions	Runners-up	Score
2020	(Uruguay) Ariel Behar (Ecuador) Gonzalo Escobar	(Croatia) Antonio Šančić (Austria) Tristan-Samuel Weissborn	6–2, 6–4
2019	(United States) Robert Galloway (United States) Nathaniel Lammons	(Monaco) Romain Arneodo (Belarus) Andrei Vasilevski	7–5, 7–6^{(7–1)}
2018	(United States) James Cerretani (India) Leander Paes	(Philippines) Treat Huey (United States) Denis Kudla	6–4, 7–5

=== Women's doubles ===
Year	Champions	Runners-up	Score
2020	(United States) Hayley Carter (2) (Brazil) Luisa Stefani	(Belgium) Marie Benoît (France) Jessika Ponchet	6–1, 6–3
2019	(United States) Hayley Carter (United States) Ena Shibahara	(United States) Taylor Townsend (Belgium) Yanina Wickmayer	6–3, 7–6^{(7–1)}
2018	(Japan) Misaki Doi (Switzerland) Jil Teichmann	(United States) Jamie Loeb (Sweden) Rebecca Peterson	7–6^{(7–4)}, 1–6, [10–8]
