= 2019 WTA 125K series =

Details
- Duration: 21 January – 22 December
- Edition: 8th
- Tournaments: 11

Achievements (singles)

The WTA 125K series is the secondary professional tennis circuit organised by the Women's Tennis Association. The 2019 WTA 125K series calendar consists of eleven tournaments, each with a total prize fund of $125,000 except the Oracle Challenger Series that offers $162,480 in prize money. Starting from 2019, Zhengzhou Open was upgraded to a WTA Premier level event while the Mumbai Open was cancelled due to elections in the city. The Oracle Challenger event in Chicago was replaced by another one in New Haven. Three new Challenger events were introduced in Guadalajara, Båstad and Karlsruhe.

== Schedule ==
Week of	Tournament	Champions	Runners-up	Semifinalists	Quarterfinalists
January 21	Oracle Challenger Series – Newport Beach; Newport Beach, United States; Hard – $162,480 – 48S/4Q/16D; Singles – Doubles	(Canada) Bianca Andreescu; 0–6, 6–4, 6–2	(United States) Jessica Pegula	(United States) Lauren Davis (Germany) Tatjana Maria	(Sweden) Rebecca Peterson (United States) Taylor Townsend (Canada) Eugenie Bouchard (United States) Nicole Gibbs
January 21	Oracle Challenger Series – Newport Beach; Newport Beach, United States; Hard – $162,480 – 48S/4Q/16D; Singles – Doubles	(United States) Hayley Carter (United States) Ena Shibahara; 6–3, 7–6^{(7–1)}	(United States) Taylor Townsend (Belgium) Yanina Wickmayer	(United States) Lauren Davis (Germany) Tatjana Maria	(Sweden) Rebecca Peterson (United States) Taylor Townsend (Canada) Eugenie Bouchard (United States) Nicole Gibbs
February 25	Oracle Challenger Series – Indian Wells; Indian Wells, United States; Hard – $162,480 – 48S/4Q/16D; Singles – Doubles	(Switzerland) Viktorija Golubic; 3–6, 7–5, 6–3	(United States) Jennifer Brady	(China) Wang Qiang (Kazakhstan) Zarina Diyas	(Czech Republic) Kristýna Plíšková (Spain) Sara Sorribes Tormo (United States) Francesca Di Lorenzo (United States) Nicole Gibbs
February 25	Oracle Challenger Series – Indian Wells; Indian Wells, United States; Hard – $162,480 – 48S/4Q/16D; Singles – Doubles	(Czech Republic) Kristýna Plíšková (Russia) Evgeniya Rodina; 7–6^{(9–7)}, 6–4	(United States) Taylor Townsend (Belgium) Yanina Wickmayer	(China) Wang Qiang (Kazakhstan) Zarina Diyas	(Czech Republic) Kristýna Plíšková (Spain) Sara Sorribes Tormo (United States) Francesca Di Lorenzo (United States) Nicole Gibbs
March 11	Abierto Zapopan; Guadalajara, Mexico; Hard – $125,000 – 32S/16Q/16D; Singles – Doubles	(Russia) Veronika Kudermetova; 6–2, 6–0	(Czech Republic) Marie Bouzková	(Germany) Tatjana Maria (France) Fiona Ferro	(Czech Republic) Kristýna Plíšková (Serbia) Olga Danilović (Mexico) Renata Zarazúa (Poland) Magda Linette
March 11	Abierto Zapopan; Guadalajara, Mexico; Hard – $125,000 – 32S/16Q/16D; Singles – Doubles	(United States) Maria Sanchez (Hungary) Fanny Stollár; 7–5, 6–1	(Sweden) Cornelia Lister (Czech Republic) Renata Voráčová	(Germany) Tatjana Maria (France) Fiona Ferro	(Czech Republic) Kristýna Plíšková (Serbia) Olga Danilović (Mexico) Renata Zarazúa (Poland) Magda Linette
April 22	Kunming Open; Anning, China; Clay – $125,000 – 32S/16Q/16D; Singles – Doubles	(China) Zheng Saisai; 6–4, 6–1	(China) Zhang Shuai	(Chinese Taipei) Liang En-shuo (Australia) Kaylah McPhee	(China) Ma Shuyue (China) Zhang Kailin (Japan) Chihiro Muramatsu (Romania) Alexandra Cadanțu
April 22	Kunming Open; Anning, China; Clay – $125,000 – 32S/16Q/16D; Singles – Doubles	(China) Peng Shuai (China) Yang Zhaoxuan; 7–5, 6–2	(China) Duan Yingying (China) Han Xinyun	(Chinese Taipei) Liang En-shuo (Australia) Kaylah McPhee	(China) Ma Shuyue (China) Zhang Kailin (Japan) Chihiro Muramatsu (Romania) Alexandra Cadanțu
June 4	Bol Open; Bol, Croatia; Clay – $125,000 – 32S/16D; Singles – Doubles	(Slovenia) Tamara Zidanšek; 7–5, 7–5	(Spain) Sara Sorribes Tormo	(Slovenia) Kaja Juvan (Slovakia) Anna Karolína Schmiedlová	(Switzerland) Timea Bacsinszky (Serbia) Aleksandra Krunić (Switzerland) Jil Teichmann (Germany) Laura Siegemund
June 4	Bol Open; Bol, Croatia; Clay – $125,000 – 32S/16D; Singles – Doubles	(Switzerland) Timea Bacsinszky (Luxembourg) Mandy Minella; 0–6, 7–6^{(7–3)}, [10–4]	(Sweden) Cornelia Lister (Czech Republic) Renata Voráčová	(Slovenia) Kaja Juvan (Slovakia) Anna Karolína Schmiedlová	(Switzerland) Timea Bacsinszky (Serbia) Aleksandra Krunić (Switzerland) Jil Teichmann (Germany) Laura Siegemund
July 8	Swedish Open; Båstad, Sweden; Clay – $125,000 – 32S/16D; Singles – Doubles	(Japan) Misaki Doi; 6–4, 6–4	(Montenegro) Danka Kovinić	(Serbia) Aleksandra Krunić (Poland) Katarzyna Kawa	(Sweden) Johanna Larsson (Germany) Mona Barthel (Russia) Natalia Vikhlyantseva (France) Fiona Ferro
July 8	Swedish Open; Båstad, Sweden; Clay – $125,000 – 32S/16D; Singles – Doubles	(Japan) Misaki Doi (Russia) Natalia Vikhlyantseva; 7–5, 6–7^{(4–7)}, [10–7]	(Chile) Alexa Guarachi (Montenegro) Danka Kovinić	(Serbia) Aleksandra Krunić (Poland) Katarzyna Kawa	(Sweden) Johanna Larsson (Germany) Mona Barthel (Russia) Natalia Vikhlyantseva (France) Fiona Ferro
July 29	Liqui Moly Open Karlsruhe; Karlsruhe, Germany; Clay – $125,000 – 32S/6Q/8D; Singles – Doubles	(Romania) Patricia Maria Țig; 3–6, 6–1, 6–2	(Belgium) Alison Van Uytvanck	(Italy) Jasmine Paolini (Spain) Paula Badosa	(Georgia (country)) Ekaterine Gorgodze (Germany) Stephanie Wagner (Germany) Tamara Korpatsch (Croatia) Tereza Mrdeža
July 29	Liqui Moly Open Karlsruhe; Karlsruhe, Germany; Clay – $125,000 – 32S/6Q/8D; Singles – Doubles	(Spain) Lara Arruabarrena (Czech Republic) Renata Voráčová; 6–7^{(2–7)}, 6–4, [10–4]	(China) Han Xinyun (China) Yuan Yue	(Italy) Jasmine Paolini (Spain) Paula Badosa	(Georgia (country)) Ekaterine Gorgodze (Germany) Stephanie Wagner (Germany) Tamara Korpatsch (Croatia) Tereza Mrdeža
September 2	Oracle Challenger Series – New Haven; New Haven, United States; Hard – $162,480 – 48S/4Q/16D; Singles – Doubles	(Russia) Anna Blinkova; 6–4, 6–2	(United States) Usue Maitane Arconada	(United Kingdom) Heather Watson (United States) Lauren Davis	(United States) Danielle Lao (Australia) Astra Sharma (France) Pauline Parmentier (United States) Jennifer Brady
September 2	Oracle Challenger Series – New Haven; New Haven, United States; Hard – $162,480 – 48S/4Q/16D; Singles – Doubles	(Russia) Anna Blinkova (Georgia (country)) Oksana Kalashnikova; 6–2, 4–6, [10–4]	(United States) Usue Maitane Arconada (United States) Jamie Loeb	(United Kingdom) Heather Watson (United States) Lauren Davis	(United States) Danielle Lao (Australia) Astra Sharma (France) Pauline Parmentier (United States) Jennifer Brady
November 11	OEC Taipei WTA Challenger; Taipei, Taiwan; Carpet (i) – $125,000 – 32S/16Q/16D; Singles – Doubles	(Russia) Vitalia Diatchenko; 6–3, 6–2	(Hungary) Tímea Babos	(Montenegro) Danka Kovinić (Bulgaria) Viktoriya Tomova	(Japan) Kyōka Okamura (Slovakia) Jana Čepelová (Slovenia) Dalila Jakupović (United Kingdom) Naiktha Bains
November 11	OEC Taipei WTA Challenger; Taipei, Taiwan; Carpet (i) – $125,000 – 32S/16Q/16D; Singles – Doubles	(Chinese Taipei) Lee Ya-hsuan (Chinese Taipei) Wu Fang-hsien; 4–6, 6–4, [10–7]	(Slovenia) Dalila Jakupović (Montenegro) Danka Kovinić	(Montenegro) Danka Kovinić (Bulgaria) Viktoriya Tomova	(Japan) Kyōka Okamura (Slovakia) Jana Čepelová (Slovenia) Dalila Jakupović (United Kingdom) Naiktha Bains
November 11	Oracle Challenger Series – Houston; Houston, United States; Hard – $162,480 – 48S/4Q/16D; Singles – Doubles	(Belgium) Kirsten Flipkens; 7–6^{(7–4)}, 6–4	(United States) CoCo Vandeweghe	(Switzerland) Stefanie Vögele (United States) Irina Falconi	(Luxembourg) Mandy Minella (Ukraine) Katarina Zavatska (United States) Caty McNally (United States) Taylor Townsend
November 11	Oracle Challenger Series – Houston; Houston, United States; Hard – $162,480 – 48S/4Q/16D; Singles – Doubles	(Australia) Ellen Perez (Brazil) Luisa Stefani; 1–6, 6–4, [10–5]	(Canada) Sharon Fichman (Japan) Ena Shibahara	(Switzerland) Stefanie Vögele (United States) Irina Falconi	(Luxembourg) Mandy Minella (Ukraine) Katarina Zavatska (United States) Caty McNally (United States) Taylor Townsend
December 16	Open BLS de Limoges; Limoges, France; Hard (i) – $125,000 – 32S/8Q/8D; Singles – Doubles	(Russia) Ekaterina Alexandrova; 6–1, 6–3	(Belarus) Aliaksandra Sasnovich	(United States) Nicole Gibbs (Belgium) Greet Minnen	(Romania) Ana Bogdan (Romania) Sorana Cîrstea (Switzerland) Jil Teichmann (Russia) Liudmila Samsonova
December 16	Open BLS de Limoges; Limoges, France; Hard (i) – $125,000 – 32S/8Q/8D; Singles – Doubles	(Spain) Georgina García Pérez (Spain) Sara Sorribes Tormo; 6–2, 7–6^{(7–3)}	(Russia) Ekaterina Alexandrova (Georgia (country)) Oksana Kalashnikova	(United States) Nicole Gibbs (Belgium) Greet Minnen	(Romania) Ana Bogdan (Romania) Sorana Cîrstea (Switzerland) Jil Teichmann (Russia) Liudmila Samsonova

== Statistical information ==
These tables present the number of singles (S) and doubles (D) titles won by each player and each nation during the season. The players/nations are sorted by: 1) total number of titles (a doubles title won by two players representing the same nation counts as only one win for the nation); 2) a singles > doubles hierarchy; 3) alphabetical order (by family names for players).

To avoid confusion and double counting, these tables should be updated only after an event is completed.

=== Titles won by player ===
Total	Player	S	D	S	D
2	Anna Blinkova (RUS)	●	●	1	1
2	Misaki Doi (JPN)	●	●	1	1
1	Ekaterina Alexandrova (RUS)	●		1	0
1	Bianca Andreescu (CAN)	●		1	0
1	Vitalia Diatchenko (RUS)	●		1	0
1	Kirsten Flipkens (BEL)	●		1	0
1	Viktorija Golubic (SUI)	●		1	0
1	Veronika Kudermetova (RUS)	●		1	0
1	Patricia Maria Țig (ROU)	●		1	0
1	Zheng Saisai (CHN)	●		1	0
1	Tamara Zidanšek (SLO)	●		1	0
1	Lara Arruabarrena (ESP)		●	0	1
1	Timea Bacsinszky (SUI)		●	0	1
1	Hayley Carter (USA)		●	0	1
1	Georgina García Pérez (ESP)		●	0	1
1	Oksana Kalashnikova (GEO)		●	0	1
1	Lee Ya-hsuan (TPE)		●	0	1
1	Mandy Minella (LUX)		●	0	1
1	Peng Shuai (CHN)		●	0	1
1	Ellen Perez (AUS)		●	0	1
1	Kristýna Plíšková (CZE)		●	0	1
1	Evgeniya Rodina (RUS)		●	0	1
1	Maria Sanchez (USA)		●	0	1
1	Ena Shibahara (USA)		●	0	1
1	Sara Sorribes Tormo (ESP)		●	0	1
1	Luisa Stefani (BRA)		●	0	1
1	Fanny Stollár (HUN)		●	0	1
1	Natalia Vikhlyantseva (RUS)		●	0	1
1	Renata Voráčová (CZE)		●	0	1
1	Wu Fang-hsien (TPE)		●	0	1
1	Yang Zhaoxuan (CHN)		●	0	1

=== Titles won by nation ===
Total	Nation	S	D
7	Russia (RUS)	4	3
2	China (CHN)	1	1
2	Japan (JPN)	1	1
2	Switzerland (SUI)	1	1
2	Czech Republic (CZE)	0	2
2	Spain (ESP)	0	2
2	United States (USA)	0	2
1	Belgium (BEL)	1	0
1	Canada (CAN)	1	0
1	Romania (ROU)	1	0
1	Slovenia (SLO)	1	0
1	Australia (AUS)	0	1
1	Brazil (BRA)	0	1
1	Chinese Taipei (TPE)	0	1
1	Georgia (GEO)	0	1
1	Hungary (HUN)	0	1
1	Luxembourg (LUX)	0	1

== Points distribution ==
Event	W	F	SF	QF	R16	R32	R48	Q	Q2	Q1
Singles (48S)	160	95	57	29	15	8	1	4	—	1
Singles (32S)	160	95	57	29	15	1	—	6	4	1
Doubles (16D)	160	95	57	29	1	—	—	—	—	—
Doubles (8D)	160	95	57	1	—	—	—	—	—	—
