= 2011 OEC Taipei Ladies Open =

Professional tennis tournament

- Date: 31 October – 6 November
- Edition: 4th
- Location: Taipei, Taiwan

Champions

Singles
- (Japan) Ayumi Morita

Doubles
- (Chinese Taipei) Chan Yung-jan / (China) Zheng Jie
- Taipei Open

The 2011 OEC Taipei Ladies Open was a professional tennis tournament played on indoor carpet courts. It was the fourth edition of the OEC Taipei Ladies Open, and part of the 2011 ITF Women's Circuit. It took place between 31 October and 6 November 2011 at the Taipei Arena in Taipei, Taiwan.

== WTA entrants ==
=== Seeds ===
Country	Player	Rank^{1}	Seed
CHN	Zheng Jie	48	1
JPN	Ayumi Morita	53	2
THA	Tamarine Tanasugarn	110	3
JPN	Misaki Doi	111	4
BLR	Olga Govortsova	129	5
TPE	Chan Yung-jan	133	6
JPN	Kimiko Date-Krumm	144	7
TPE	Chang Kai-chen	150	8

- ^{1} Rankings are as of October 24, 2011.

=== Other entrants ===
The following players received wildcards into the singles main draw:

- (Chinese Taipei) Chan Chin-wei
- (Chinese Taipei) Hsu Wen-hsin
- (Chinese Taipei) Juan Ting-fei
- (Chinese Taipei) Lee Ya-hsuan

The following players received entry from the qualifying draw:

- (Hong Kong) Chan Wing-yau
- (Japan) Kumiko Iijima
- (Thailand) Nudnida Luangnam
- (China) Wang Qiang

== Champions ==
=== Singles ===
(Japan) Ayumi Morita def. (Japan) Kimiko Date-Krumm, 6–2, 6–2

=== Doubles ===
(Chinese Taipei) Chan Yung-jan / (China) Zheng Jie def. (Czech Republic) Karolína Plíšková / (Czech Republic) Kristýna Plíšková, 7–6^{(7–5)}, 5–7, [10–5]
