= 2011 OEC Taipei Ladies Open – Singles =

Singles
- 2011 OEC Taipei Ladies Open

Final
- Champion: (Japan) Ayumi Morita
- Runner-up: (Japan) Kimiko Date-Krumm
- Score: 6–2, 6–2

Events
Singles	Doubles
- OEC Taipei Ladies Open

The Taipei Open is a tennis tournament for female professionals played on indoor carpet courts. In 2011, it was known was the OEC Taipei Ladies Open. It is held at the National Taiwan University Gymnasium and the Taipei Arena. Peng Shuai was the defending champion, but chose to participate at the Tournament of Champions instead.

As a result, Ayumi Morita won the title defeating Kimiko Date-Krumm in the final 6–2, 6–2.

== Seeds ==
1. (China) Zheng Jie (second round)
2. (Japan) Ayumi Morita (champion)
3. (Thailand) Tamarine Tanasugarn (second round)
4. (Japan) Misaki Doi (quarterfinals)
5. (Belarus) Olga Govortsova (semifinals)
6. (Chinese Taipei) Chan Yung-jan (second round)
7. (Japan) Kimiko Date-Krumm (final)
8. (Chinese Taipei) Chang Kai-chen (semifinals)

== Main draw ==
Key

- Q = Qualifier
- WC = Wild card
- LL = Lucky loser
- Alt = Alternate
- ITF = ITF entry
- PR = Protected ranking
- SR = Special ranking
- SE = Special exempt
- JE = Junior exempt
- JR = Junior Accelerator Programme entrant
- CO = College Accelerator Programme entrant
- NG = Next Gen Accelerator Program entrant
- w/o = Walkover
- r = Retired
- d = Defaulted

=== Finals ===
Semifinals
8	(Chinese Taipei) Chang Kai-chen	1	1
7	(Japan) Kimiko Date-Krumm	6	6
5	(Belarus) Olga Govortsova	2	6	4
2	(Japan) Ayumi Morita	6	0	6

Final
7	(Japan) Kimiko Date-Krumm	2	2
2	(Japan) Ayumi Morita	6	6

=== Top half ===
First round
1	(China) J Zheng	6	3	6
Q	(Thailand) N Luangnam	2	6	1
(Kazakhstan) Y Shvedova	6	6
(Japan) R Fujiwara	3	3
(Japan) M Eguchi	6^{4}	4
(Chinese Taipei) S-w Hsieh	7^{7}	6
(Turkey) Ç Büyükakçay	2	3
8	(Chinese Taipei) K-c Chang	6	6
4	(Japan) M Doi	6	6
(Indonesia) A-F Damayanti	4	1
Q	(China) Q Wang	6	6
(Japan) J Namigata	2	3
(Japan) Y Sema	7	7
(China) S Zheng	5	5
WC	(Chinese Taipei) C-w Chan	2	4
7	(Japan) K Date-Krumm	6	6

Second round
1	(China) J Zheng	2	2
(Kazakhstan) Y Shvedova	6	6
(Chinese Taipei) S-w Hsieh	6	1	4
8	(Chinese Taipei) K-c Chang	4	6	6
4	(Japan) M Doi	6	4	7^{7}
Q	(China) Q Wang	0	6	6^{5}
(Japan) Y Sema	1	2
7	(Japan) K Date-Krumm	6	6

Quarterfinals
(Kazakhstan) Y Shvedova	3	4
8	(Chinese Taipei) K-c Chang	6	6
4	(Japan) M Doi	5	3
7	(Japan) K Date-Krumm	7	6

Semifinals
8	(Chinese Taipei) K-c Chang	1	1
7	(Japan) K Date-Krumm	6	6

=== Bottom half ===
First round
5	(Belarus) O Govortsova	7^{8}	6
(Czech Republic) Kr Plíšková	6^{6}	3
WC	(Chinese Taipei) T-f Juan	5	4
Q	(Hong Kong) W-y Chan	7	6
(United States) J Craybas	6	6
(Thailand) V Wongteanchai	1	2
WC	(Chinese Taipei) Y-h Lee	3	0
3	(Thailand) T Tanasugarn	6	6
6	(Chinese Taipei) Y-j Chan	6	4	6
(Thailand) N Leertcheewakarn	4	6	1
SR	(Hungary) K Marosi	1	6	3
(Czech Republic) Ka Plíšková	6	3	6
WC	(Chinese Taipei) W-h Hsu	0	3
SR	(Australia) M Adamczak	6	6
Q	(Japan) K Iijima	2	4
2	(Japan) A Morita	6	6

Second round
5	(Belarus) O Govortsova	6	6
Q	(Hong Kong) W-y Chan	0	1
(United States) J Craybas	6	0	6
3	(Thailand) T Tanasugarn	4	6	4
6	(Chinese Taipei) Y-j Chan	4	4
(Czech Republic) Ka Plíšková	6	6
SR	(Australia) M Adamczak	2	2
2	(Japan) A Morita	6	6

Quarterfinals
5	(Belarus) O Govortsova	6	6
(United States) J Craybas	1	1
(Czech Republic) Ka Plíšková	7^{7}	1	0
2	(Japan) A Morita	6^{5}	6	6

Semifinals
5	(Belarus) O Govortsova	2	6	4
2	(Japan) A Morita	6	0	6
