= 2019 OEC Taipei WTA Challenger =

- Date: 11–17 November
- Edition: 12th
- Category: WTA 125K series
- Prize money: $125,000
- Surface: Carpet (indoor)
- Location: Taipei, Taiwan

Champions

Singles
- (Russia) Vitalia Diatchenko

Doubles
- (Chinese Taipei) Lee Ya-hsuan / (Chinese Taipei) Wu Fang-hsien
← 2018 ·	OEC Taipei WTA Challenger	· 2020 →

The 2019 OEC Taipei WTA Challenger was a professional tennis tournament played on indoor carpet courts. It was the 12th edition of the tournament and part of the 2019 WTA 125K series, offering a total of $125,000 in prize money. It took place at the Taipei Arena in Taipei, Taiwan, on 11–17 November 2019.

== Singles main draw entrants ==
=== Seeds ===
Country	Player	Rank^{1}	Seed
MNE	Danka Kovinić	88	1
HUN	Tímea Babos	104	2
RUS	Vitalia Diatchenko	107	3
AUS	Priscilla Hon	126	4
CZE	Tereza Martincová	130	5
SLO	Kaja Juvan	133	6
NED	Bibiane Schoofs	149	7
BUL	Viktoriya Tomova	159	8

- ^{1} Rankings as of 4 November 2019.

=== Other entrants ===
The following player received wildcards into the singles main draw:

- (Hong Kong) Eudice Chong
- (Chinese Taipei) Joanna Garland
- (Chinese Taipei) Hsu Ching-wen
- (Chinese Taipei) Yang Ya-yi

The following players received entry from the qualifying draw:

- (Chinese Taipei) Lee Ya-hsin
- (Australia) Storm Sanders
- (Indonesia) Aldila Sutjiadi
- (United Kingdom) Emily Webley-Smith

=== Withdrawals ===
- (Australia) Lizette Cabrera → replaced by (Switzerland) Susan Bandecchi
- (Romania) Jaqueline Cristian → replaced by (Australia) Arina Rodionova
- (Australia) Maddison Inglis → replaced by (Poland) Urszula Radwańska
- (Thailand) Luksika Kumkhum → replaced by (United Kingdom) Naiktha Bains
- (Chinese Taipei) Liang En-shuo → replaced by (Russia) Kamilla Rakhimova
- (Romania) Monica Niculescu → replaced by (Croatia) Jana Fett
- (Romania) Elena-Gabriela Ruse → replaced by (France) Amandine Hesse
- (Russia) Valeria Savinykh → replaced by (Chinese Taipei) Lee Ya-hsuan
- (Serbia) Nina Stojanović → replaced by (Japan) Kyōka Okamura
- (Italy) Martina Trevisan → replaced by (Thailand) Peangtarn Plipuech

== Doubles entrants ==
=== Seeds ===
Country	Player	Country	Player	Rank^{1}	Seed
AUS	Arina Rodionova	AUS	Storm Sanders	206	1
SLO	Dalila Jakupović	MNE	Danka Kovinić	227	2
IND	Ankita Raina	NED	Bibiane Schoofs	264	3
RUS	Yana Sizikova	GBR	Emily Webley-Smith	278	4

- ^{1} Rankings as of 4 November 2019.

=== Other entrants ===
The following pair received a wildcard into the doubles main draw:

- (Chinese Taipei) Joanna Garland / (Chinese Taipei) Yang Ya-yi

== Champions ==
=== Singles ===
- (Russia) Vitalia Diatchenko def. (Hungary) Tímea Babos, 6–3, 6–2

=== Doubles ===
- (Chinese Taipei) Lee Ya-hsuan / (Chinese Taipei) Wu Fang-hsien def. (Slovenia) Dalila Jakupović / (Montenegro) Danka Kovinić 4–6, 6–4, [10–7]
