= 2019 Kunming Open – Men's doubles =

Men's doubles
- 2019 Kunming Open

Final
- Champions: (Australia) Max Purcell (Australia) Luke Saville
- Runners-up: (Netherlands) David Pel (Chile) Hans Podlipnik Castillo
- Score: 4–6, 7–5, [10–5]

Events
Singles	men	women
Doubles	men	women
- Kunming Open

Aliaksandr Bury and Lloyd Harris were the defending champions but chose not to defend their title.

Max Purcell and Luke Saville won the title after defeating David Pel and Hans Podlipnik Castillo 4–6, 7–5, [10–5] in the final.

== Seeds ==
1. (China) Gong Maoxin / (China) Zhang Ze (quarterfinals)
2. (India) Sriram Balaji / (United States) James Cerretani (quarterfinals)
3. (Australia) Max Purcell / (Australia) Luke Saville (champions)
4. (Netherlands) Sander Arends / (Austria) Tristan-Samuel Weissborn (semifinals)

== Draw ==
Key

- Q = Qualifier
- WC = Wild card
- LL = Lucky loser
- Alt = Alternate
- ITF = ITF entry
- PR = Protected ranking
- SR = Special ranking
- SE = Special exempt
- JE = Junior exempt
- JR = Junior Accelerator Programme entrant
- CO = College Accelerator Programme entrant
- NG = Next Gen Accelerator Program entrant
- w/o = Walkover
- r = Retired
- d = Defaulted

First round
1	(China) M Gong (China) Ze Zhang	6	7^{7}
WC	(China) X Gao (China) Zh Zhang	3	6^{0}
(Netherlands) D Pel (Chile) H Podlipnik Castillo	5	6	[10]
(Chinese Taipei) J Jung (Thailand) Sa Ratiwatana	7	1	[4]
4	(Netherlands) S Arends (Austria) T-S Weissborn	7^{7}	7^{9}
(India) R Ramanathan (India) V Vardhan	6^{4}	6^{7}
(Chinese Taipei) C-p Hsieh (Chinese Taipei) T-h Yang	6^{2}	6	[7]
(Poland) K Majchrzak (Japan) T Matsui	7^{7}	4	[10]
(India) P Gunneswaran (India) S Myneni	7^{7}	6
(Spain) E López Pérez (Switzerland) L Margaroli	6^{5}	4
(China) Z Li (Portugal) G Oliveira	5	3
3	(Australia) M Purcell (Australia) L Saville	7	6
WC	(China) Y Bai (China) F Sun	6	7^{7}
(Thailand) So Ratiwatana (Indonesia) C Rungkat	3	6^{1}
WC	(China) Y He (China) D Wu	4	6^{4}
2	(India) S Balaji (United States) J Cerretani	6	7^{7}

Quarterfinals
1	(China) M Gong (China) Ze Zhang	6^{5}	4
(Netherlands) D Pel (Chile) H Podlipnik Castillo	7^{7}	6
4	(Netherlands) S Arends (Austria) T-S Weissborn	6	7
(Poland) K Majchrzak (Japan) T Matsui	3	5
(India) P Gunneswaran (India) S Myneni	1	1
3	(Australia) M Purcell (Australia) L Saville	6	6
WC	(China) Y Bai (China) F Sun	7^{11}	4	[11]
2	(India) S Balaji (United States) J Cerretani	6^{9}	6	[9]

Semifinals
(Netherlands) D Pel (Chile) H Podlipnik Castillo	6	6
4	(Netherlands) S Arends (Austria) T-S Weissborn	2	3
3	(Australia) M Purcell (Australia) L Saville	6	6
WC	(China) Y Bai (China) F Sun	3	2

Final
(Netherlands) D Pel (Chile) H Podlipnik Castillo	6	5	[5]
3	(Australia) M Purcell (Australia) L Saville	4	7	[10]
