= 2019 Abierto Zapopan =

- Date: 11–16 March
- Edition: 1st
- Category: WTA 125K series
- Draw: 32S / 16D
- Prize money: $125,000
- Surface: Hard
- Location: Guadalajara, Mexico
- Venue: Panamerican Tennis Center

Champions

Singles
- (Russia) Veronika Kudermetova

Doubles
- (United States) Maria Sanchez / (Hungary) Fanny Stollár
- Abierto Zapopan

The 2019 Abierto Zapopan 125K was a professional tennis tournament played on outdoor hardcourts. It was the 1st edition of the tournament and part of the 2019 WTA 125K series, offering a total of $125,000 in prize money. It took place in Guadalajara, Mexico on 11–16 March 2019.

== Singles main draw entrants ==
=== Seeds ===
Country	Player	Rank^{1}	Seed
FRA	Alizé Cornet	52	1
SVK	Anna Karolína Schmiedlová	63	2
GER	Tatjana Maria	69	3
ROU	Irina-Camelia Begu	70	4
RUS	Evgeniya Rodina	71	5
ESP	Lara Arruabarrena	88	6
CZE	Kristýna Plíšková	90	7
POL	Magda Linette	92	8

- ^{1} Rankings as of 4 March 2019.

=== Other entrants ===
The following players received a wildcard into the singles main draw:

- (Mexico) Giuliana Olmos
- (Mexico) Renata Zarazúa
- (Russia) Sofya Zhuk

The following players qualified into the singles main draw:

- (Serbia) Natalija Kostić
- (United States) Varvara Lepchenko
- (Switzerland) Conny Perrin
- (China) Wang Xiyu

The following players received entry into the main draw as lucky losers:

- (Spain) Paula Badosa Gibert
- (Ukraine) Katarina Zavatska

=== Withdrawals ===
- (Germany) Mona Barthel → replaced by (France) Fiona Ferro
- (Canada) Eugénie Bouchard → replaced by (Ukraine) Anhelina Kalinina
- (Russia) Margarita Gasparyan → replaced by (Russia) Vitalia Diatchenko
- (Slovenia) Dalila Jakupović → replaced by (Italy) Sara Errani
- (France) Pauline Parmentier → replaced by (Russia) Anna Blinkova
- (Russia) Anastasia Potapova → replaced by (Spain) Paula Badosa Gibert
- (Spain) Sara Sorribes Tormo → replaced by (Ukraine) Katarina Zavatska
- (United States) Taylor Townsend → replaced by (Romania) Ana Bogdan
- (Switzerland) Stefanie Vögele → replaced by (United Kingdom) Heather Watson
- (China) Wang Yafan → replaced by (Belgium) Yanina Wickmayer
- (Slovenia) Tamara Zidanšek → replaced by (Czech Republic) Marie Bouzková
- (Russia) Vera Zvonareva → replaced by (Serbia) Olga Danilović

== Doubles entrants ==
=== Seeds ===
Country	Player	Country	Player	Rank^{1}	Seed
JPN	Miyu Kato	JPN	Makoto Ninomiya	80	1
JPN	Nao Hibino	USA	Desirae Krawczyk	117	2
CHI	Alexa Guarachi	USA	Sabrina Santamaria	144	3
RUS	Anna Blinkova	RUS	Alexandra Panova	150	4

- ^{1} Rankings as of 4 March 2019.

=== Other entrants ===
The following pair received a wildcard into the doubles main draw:

- (Switzerland) Conny Perrin / (Russia) Sofya Zhuk

== Champions ==
=== Singles ===
- (Russia) Veronika Kudermetova def. (Czech Republic) Marie Bouzková 6–2, 6–0

=== Doubles ===
- (United States) Maria Sanchez / (Hungary) Fanny Stollár def. (Sweden) Cornelia Lister / (Czech Republic) Renata Voráčová 7–5, 6–1
