= 2025 Qatar TotalEnergies Open – Doubles =

Doubles
- 2025 Qatar TotalEnergies Open

Final
- Champions: (Italy) Sara Errani (Italy) Jasmine Paolini
- Runners-up: (China) Jiang Xinyu (Chinese Taipei) Wu Fang-hsien
- Score: 7–5, 7–6^{(12–10)}

Details
- Draw: 28
- Seeds: 8

Events
Singles	Doubles
← 2024 ·	WTA Qatar Open	· 2026 →

Sara Errani and Jasmine Paolini defeated Jiang Xinyu and Wu Fang-hsien in the final, 7–5, 7–6^{(12–10)} to win the doubles tennis title at the 2025 Qatar Open.

Demi Schuurs and Luisa Stefani were the defending champions, but chose not to participate together. Schuurs partnered Asia Muhammad, but lost in the second round to Alexandra Panova and Fanny Stollár. Stefani partnered Peyton Stearns, but lost in the second round to Chan Hao-ching and Veronika Kudermetova.

== Seeds ==
The top four seeds received a bye into the second round.

1. (Canada) Gabriela Dabrowski / (New Zealand) Erin Routliffe (second round)
2. (Chinese Taipei) Hsieh Su-wei / (Latvia) Jeļena Ostapenko (second round)
3. (Italy) Sara Errani / (Italy) Jasmine Paolini (champions)
4. (United States) Sofia Kenin / (Ukraine) Lyudmyla Kichenok (second round)
5. (Chinese Taipei) Chan Hao-ching / Veronika Kudermetova (quarterfinals, withdrew)
6. (Belgium) Elise Mertens / (Australia) Ellen Perez (quarterfinals)
7. (Kazakhstan) Anna Danilina / Irina Khromacheva (quarterfinals)
8. (United States) Asia Muhammad / (Netherlands) Demi Schuurs (second round)

== Draw ==
=== Key ===
- Q = Qualifier
- WC = Wild card
- LL = Lucky loser
- Alt = Alternate
- ITF = ITF entry
- PR = Protected ranking
- SR = Special ranking
- SE = Special exempt
- JE = Junior exempt
- JR = Junior Accelerator Programme entrant
- CO = College Accelerator Programme entrant
- NG = Next Gen Accelerator Program entrant
- w/o = Walkover
- r = Retired
- d = Defaulted

=== Finals ===
Semifinals
Mirra Andreeva; Diana Shnaider	6	6^{2}	[9]
3	(Italy) Sara Errani (Italy) Jasmine Paolini	4	7^{7}	[11]
(Brazil) Beatriz Haddad Maia (Germany) Laura Siegemund	2	3
(China) Jiang Xinyu (Chinese Taipei) Wu Fang-hsien	6	6

Final
3	(Italy) Sara Errani (Italy) Jasmine Paolini	7	7^{12}
(China) Jiang Xinyu (Chinese Taipei) Wu Fang-hsien	5	6^{10}

=== Top half ===
First round
M Andreeva; D Shnaider	4	6	[10]
(United States) A Krueger (United States) J Pegula	6	3	[7]
(United States) D Krawczyk (Mexico) G Olmos	3	7	[4]
(Japan) S Aoyama (Japan) E Hozumi	6	5	[10]
(Slovakia) T Mihalíková (United Kingdom) O Nicholls	5	4
7	(Kazakhstan) A Danilina; I Khromacheva	7	6
(Norway) U Eikeri (Romania) M Niculescu	6	6
(Czech Republic) L Nosková (Kazakhstan) Y Putintseva	4	4
A Panova (Hungary) F Stollár	6	6
(France) K Mladenovic (China) S Zhang	1	4
(Canada) L Fernandez (Ukraine) N Kichenok	2	1
8	(United States) A Muhammad (Netherlands) D Schuurs	6	6

Second round
1	(Canada) G Dabrowski (New Zealand) E Routliffe	2	1
M Andreeva; D Shnaider	6	6
(Japan) S Aoyama (Japan) E Hozumi	4	6	[6]
7	(Kazakhstan) A Danilina; I Khromacheva	6	4	[10]
3	(Italy) S Errani (Italy) J Paolini	6	6
(Norway) U Eikeri (Romania) M Niculescu	3	2
A Panova (Hungary) F Stollár	7	6^{3}	[10]
8	(United States) A Muhammad (Netherlands) D Schuurs	5	7^{7}	[5]

Quarterfinals
M Andreeva; D Shnaider	6	6
7	(Kazakhstan) A Danilina; I Khromacheva	4	1
3	(Italy) S Errani (Italy) J Paolini	6	6
A Panova (Hungary) F Stollár	2	1

Semifinals
M Andreeva; D Shnaider	6	6^{2}	[9]
3	(Italy) S Errani (Italy) J Paolini	4	7^{7}	[11]

=== Bottom half ===
First round
6	(Belgium) E Mertens (Australia) E Perez	7^{7}	7
WC	(China) Xin Wang (China) S Zheng	6^{4}	5
WC	(United States) B Mattek-Sands (Czech Republic) L Šafářová	3	2
PR	(China) Y Xu (China) Z Yang	6	6
(Brazil) B Haddad Maia (Germany) L Siegemund	6	6
E Alexandrova; L Samsonova	1	3
5	(Chinese Taipei) H-c Chan; V Kudermetova	6	6
(Ukraine) M Kostyuk (Romania) E-G Ruse	3	4
(Hungary) T Babos (United States) N Melichar-Martinez	3	6	[6]
WC	(United States) P Stearns (Brazil) L Stefani	6	4	[10]
(Spain) C Bucșa (Japan) M Kato	6^{7}	6	[6]
(China) X Jiang (Chinese Taipei) F-h Wu	7^{9}	3	[10]

Second round
6	(Belgium) E Mertens (Australia) E Perez	7	6
PR	(China) Y Xu (China) Z Yang	5	3
(Brazil) B Haddad Maia (Germany) L Siegemund	6	6
4	(United States) S Kenin (Ukraine) L Kichenok	4	2
5	(Chinese Taipei) H-c Chan; V Kudermetova	7^{7}	6
WC	(United States) P Stearns (Brazil) L Stefani	6^{5}	1
(China) X Jiang (Chinese Taipei) F-h Wu	6	6^{3}	[10]
2	(Chinese Taipei) S-w Hsieh (Latvia) J Ostapenko	2	7^{7}	[5]

Quarterfinals
6	(Belgium) E Mertens (Australia) E Perez	7	4	[9]
(Brazil) B Haddad Maia (Germany) L Siegemund	5	6	[11]
5	(Chinese Taipei) H-c Chan; V Kudermetova
(China) X Jiang (Chinese Taipei) F-h Wu	w/o

Semifinals
(Brazil) B Haddad Maia (Germany) L Siegemund	2	3
(China) X Jiang (Chinese Taipei) F-h Wu	6	6
