= 2019 OEC Taipei WTA Challenger – Singles =

Singles
- 2019 OEC Taipei WTA Challenger

Final
- Champion: (Russia) Vitalia Diatchenko
- Runner-up: (Hungary) Tímea Babos
- Score: 6–3, 6–2

Events
Singles	Doubles
- OEC Taipei WTA Challenger

Luksika Kumkhum was the defending champion, but chose not to participate.

Vitalia Diatchenko won the title for the second time, defeating Tímea Babos in the final, 6–3, 6–2.

== Seeds ==
1. (Montenegro) Danka Kovinić (semifinals)
2. (Hungary) Tímea Babos (final)
3. (Russia) Vitalia Diatchenko (champion)
4. (Australia) Priscilla Hon (first round)
5. (Czech Republic) Tereza Martincová (first round)
6. (Slovenia) Kaja Juvan (second round, retired)
7. (Netherlands) Bibiane Schoofs (first round)
8. (Bulgaria) Viktoriya Tomova (semifinals)

== Draw ==
Key

- Q = Qualifier
- WC = Wild card
- LL = Lucky loser
- Alt = Alternate
- ITF = ITF entry
- PR = Protected ranking
- SR = Special ranking
- SE = Special exempt
- JE = Junior exempt
- JR = Junior Accelerator Programme entrant
- CO = College Accelerator Programme entrant
- NG = Next Gen Accelerator Program entrant
- w/o = Walkover
- r = Retired
- d = Defaulted

=== Finals ===
Semifinals
1	(Montenegro) Danka Kovinić	3	2
3	(Russia) Vitalia Diatchenko	6	6
8	(Bulgaria) Viktoriya Tomova	1	2
2	(Hungary) Tímea Babos	6	6

Final
3	(Russia) Vitalia Diatchenko	6	6
2	(Hungary) Tímea Babos	3	2

=== Top half ===
First round
1	(Montenegro) D Kovinić	6^{3}	6	6
WC	(Hong Kong) E Chong	7^{7}	4	3
(Croatia) J Fett	6	1	2
(Poland) U Radwańska	0	6	6
(Thailand) P Plipuech	7	3	3
(Japan) K Okamura	5	6	6
(Bulgaria) I Shinikova	6	6
7	(Netherlands) B Schoofs	2	4
3	(Russia) V Diatchenko	7^{7}	6
(India) A Raina	6^{1}	1
(Japan) R Ozaki	1	3
(Russia) K Rakhimova	6	6
(Chinese Taipei) Ya-hsu Lee	7^{11}	6
(Japan) C Muramatsu	6^{9}	4
(Slovakia) J Čepelová	6	6
5	(Czech Republic) T Martincová	3	1

Second round
1	(Montenegro) D Kovinić	6	7
(Poland) U Radwańska	2	5
(Japan) K Okamura	1	6	6
(Bulgaria) I Shinikova	6	2	4
3	(Russia) V Diatchenko	6	6
(Russia) K Rakhimova	4	4
(Chinese Taipei) Ya-hsu Lee	3	3
(Slovakia) J Čepelová	6	6

Quarterfinals
1	(Montenegro) D Kovinić	6	6
(Japan) K Okamura	3	0
3	(Russia) V Diatchenko	6	6
(Slovakia) J Čepelová	1	1

Semifinals
1	(Montenegro) D Kovinić	3	2
3	(Russia) V Diatchenko	6	6

=== Bottom half ===
First round
8	(Bulgaria) V Tomova	6	2	3
(Switzerland) S Bandecchi	4	6	0^{r}
WC	(Chinese Taipei) J Garland	3	3
WC	(Chinese Taipei) Y-y Yang	6	6
(Slovenia) D Jakupović	2	6	6
Q	(Chinese Taipei) Ya-hsi Lee	6	2	2
(France) A Hesse	6	3	6
4	(Australia) P Hon	4	6	3
6	(Slovenia) K Juvan	6	6
Q	(United Kingdom) E Webley-Smith	1	2
(Australia) Ar Rodionova	3	7^{7}	5
(United Kingdom) N Bains	6	6^{3}	7
WC	(Chinese Taipei) C-w Hsu	1	4
Q	(Australia) S Sanders	6	6
Q	(Indonesia) A Sutjiadi	6	4	3
2	(Hungary) T Babos	2	6	6

Second round
8	(Bulgaria) V Tomova	6	6
WC	(Chinese Taipei) Y-y Yang	4	2
(Slovenia) D Jakupović	3	6	6
(France) A Hesse	6	3	3
6	(Slovenia) K Juvan	6	2	4^{r}
(United Kingdom) N Bains	1	6	3
Q	(Australia) S Sanders	4	6^{8}
2	(Hungary) T Babos	6	7^{10}

Quarterfinals
8	(Bulgaria) V Tomova	6	7
(Slovenia) D Jakupović	0	5
(United Kingdom) N Bains	4	6	3
2	(Hungary) T Babos	6	4	6

Semifinals
8	(Bulgaria) V Tomova	1	2
2	(Hungary) T Babos	6	6

== Qualifying ==
=== Seeds ===
1. (Indonesia) Aldila Sutjiadi (qualified)
2. (Australia) Storm Sanders (qualified)
3. (Germany) Sarah-Rebecca Sekulic (qualifying competition)
4. (United Kingdom) Emily Webley-Smith (qualified)
5. (Russia) Yana Sizikova (qualifying competition)
6. (Germany) Jasmin Jebawy (first round)
7. (Belarus) Sviatlana Pirazhenka (first round)
8. (Chinese Taipei) Lee Ya-hsin (qualified)

=== Qualifiers ===
1. (Indonesia) Aldila Sutjiadi
2. (Australia) Storm Sanders
3. (Chinese Taipei) Lee Ya-hsin
4. (United Kingdom) Emily Webley-Smith

=== Qualifying draw ===
==== First qualifier ====
First round
1	(Indonesia) Aldila Sutjiadi	6	1	7
(Chinese Taipei) Cho Yi-tsen	0	6	5
(Russia) Natela Dzalamidze	6	6
7	(Belarus) Sviatlana Pirazhenka	3	1

Qualifying competition
1	(Indonesia) Aldila Sutjiadi	5	6	6
(Russia) Natela Dzalamidze	7	2	4

==== Second qualifier ====
First round
2	(Australia) Storm Sanders	2	6	6
WC	(Chinese Taipei) Chen Pei-hsuan	6	0	3
WC	(Chinese Taipei) Lee Kuan-yi	6	6
6	(Germany) Jasmin Jebawy	3	3

Qualifying competition
2	(Australia) Storm Sanders	6	6
WC	(Chinese Taipei) Lee Kuan-yi	3	2

==== Third qualifier ====
First round
3	(Germany) Sarah-Rebecca Sekulic	6	6
(Chinese Taipei) Hsieh Yu-chieh	2	3
(Japan) Naoko Eto	0	1
8	(Chinese Taipei) Lee Ya-hsin	6	6

Qualifying competition
3	(Germany) Sarah-Rebecca Sekulic	7^{7}	6^{5}	4
8	(Chinese Taipei) Lee Ya-hsin	6^{5}	7^{7}	6

==== Fourth qualifier ====
First round
4	(United Kingdom) Emily Webley-Smith	6	6
(Chinese Taipei) Cho I-hsuan	4	1
(United States) Alexandra Riley	4	2
5	(Russia) Yana Sizikova	6	6

Qualifying competition
4	(United Kingdom) Emily Webley-Smith	6	6
5	(Russia) Yana Sizikova	2	2
