= Taipei Open =

Taipei WTA Challenger

Defunct tennis tournament
- Event name: Taipei WTA Challenger
- Founded: 2006
- Abolished: 2019
- Location: Taipei City; Taiwan
- Venue: Taipei Arena
- Category: WTA 125K series
- Surface: Carpet - indoors
- Draw: 32S / 16Q / 16D
- Prize money: US$125,000 (2019)
- Website: www.oectennis.com

Current champions (2019)
- Singles: (Russia) Vitalia Diatchenko
- Doubles: (Chinese Taipei) Lee Ya-hsuan (Chinese Taipei) Wu Fang-hsien

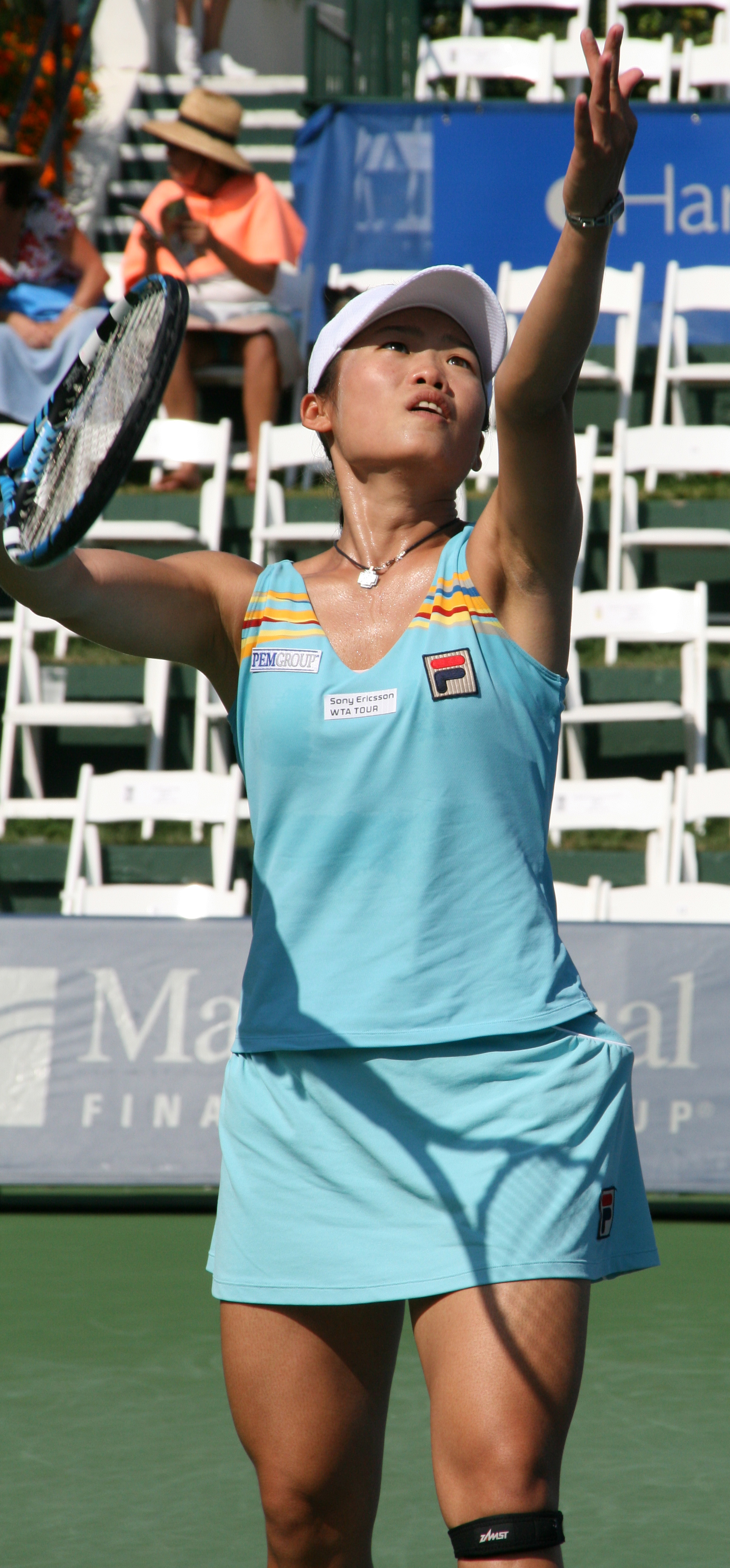
Chuang Chia-jung has lifted the doubles trophy three times at this event as the home-crowd favourite

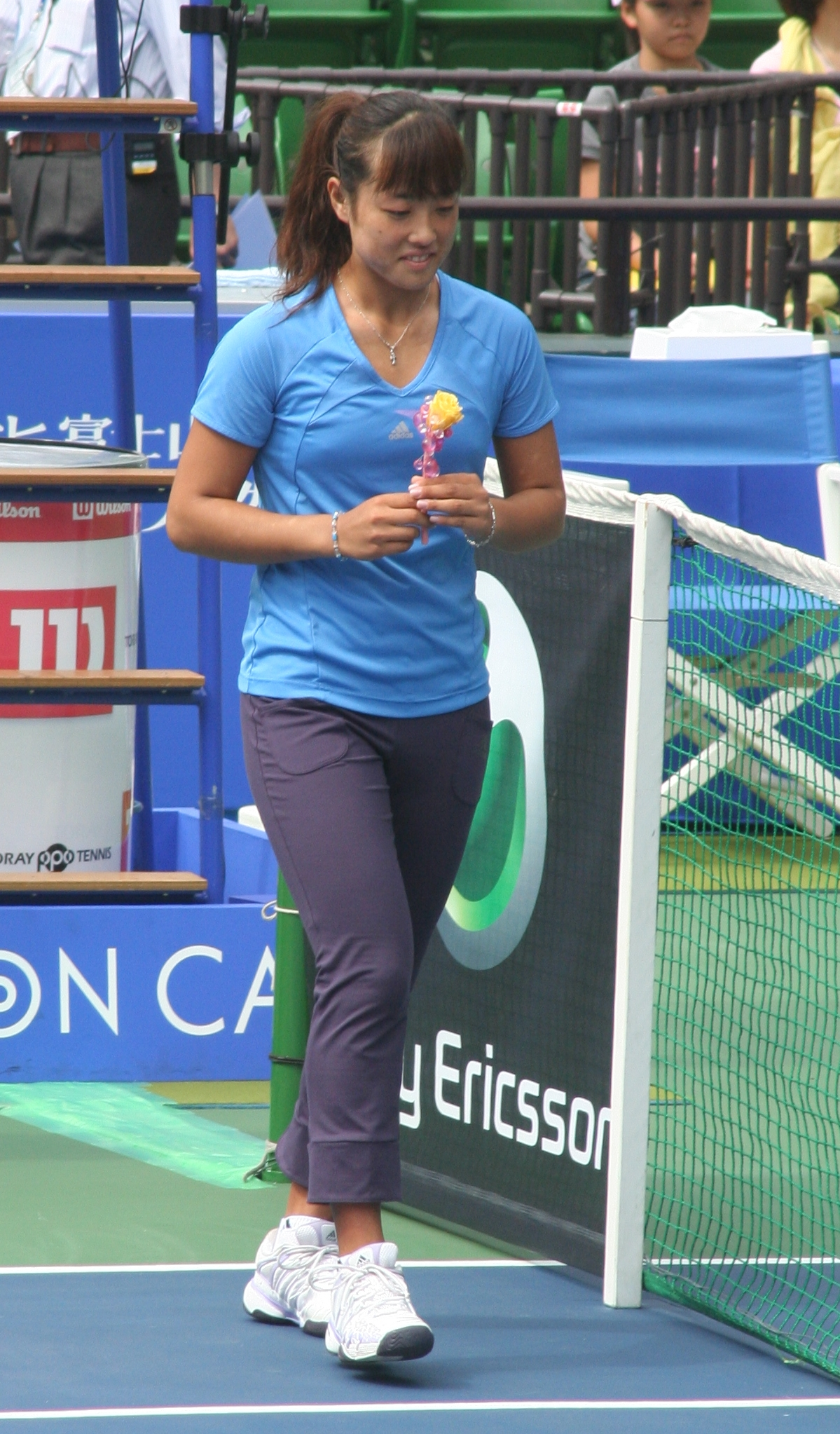
Japan's Ayumi Morita has reached the singles final three times here; winning the title in 2011 and finishing runner-up in 2009 & 2010

The Taipei Open or Taipei WTA Challenger (Chinese: 台北海碩網球公開賽) was a tournament for female professional tennis players played on indoor carpet courts. The event was classified as a WTA 125 tournament, and held annually in November in Taipei City, from 2008 until 2015, and was sponsored by the OEC Group. In 2012, the event was upgraded from a $100k ITF tournament to a WTA Challenger tournament. Its final edition took place in 2019.

== History ==
In 2007, OEC Group Chairman Robert Han organized an ITF tournament in Taoyuan where the prize was $50,000 plus hotel. OEC has retroactively referred to the event as the 2007 OEC Cup Taiwan Ladies Open.

In October 18–20, 2008, the OEC Group held the 2008 OEC Taipei Ladies Open, which was a WTA-sanctioned ITF $100,000+H tournament. held at the National Taiwan University Gymnasium and the Taipei Arena. In 2010 and 2011, it was called the OEC Taipei Ladies Open, and it was also sometimes referred to as the Haishuo Cup (海碩盃).

In 2012, the event was upgraded to a WTA 125 event. It had attracted over 60,000 visitors. In 2013, the tournament was renamed to OEC Taipei WTA Challenger. and used that name subsequently.

== Past finals ==
=== Singles ===
| Year | Champion | Runner-up | Score |
|---|---|---|---|
↓ ITF $75k Kaohsiung event ↓
| †2006 | (Chinese Taipei) Chan Yung-jan | (Chinese Taipei) Hsieh Su-wei | 5–7, 7–6^{(8–6)}, 6–0 |
↓ $50k Taoyuan event ↓
| 2007 | (Japan) Akiko Morigami | (Belgium) Yanina Wickmayer | 6–4, 7–6 ^{(7–5)} |
↓ $100k+H event ↓
| 2008 | (Slovakia) Jarmila Gajdošová | (Italy) Corinna Dentoni | 4–6, 6–4, 6–1 |
| 2009 | (Chinese Taipei) Chan Yung-jan | (Japan) Ayumi Morita | 6–4, 2–6, 6–2 |
| 2010 | (China) Peng Shuai | (Japan) Ayumi Morita | 6–1, 6–4 |
| 2011 | (Japan) Ayumi Morita | (Japan) Kimiko Date-Krumm | 6–2, 6–2 |
↓ WTA 125 event ↓
| 2012 | (France) Kristina Mladenovic | (Chinese Taipei) Chang Kai-chen | 6–4, 6–3 |
| 2013 | (Belgium) Alison Van Uytvanck | (Belgium) Yanina Wickmayer | 6–4, 6–2 |
| 2014 | (Russia) Vitalia Diatchenko | (Chinese Taipei) Chan Yung-jan | 1–6, 6–2, 6–4 |
| 2015 | (Hungary) Tímea Babos | (Japan) Misaki Doi | 7–5, 6–3 |
| 2016 | (Russia) Evgeniya Rodina | (Chinese Taipei) Chang Kai-chen | 6–4, 6–3 |
| 2017 | (Switzerland) Belinda Bencic | (Netherlands) Arantxa Rus | 7–6^{(7–3)}, 6–1 |
| 2018 | (Thailand) Luksika Kumkhum | (Germany) Sabine Lisicki | 6–1, 6–3 |
| 2019 | (Russia) Vitalia Diatchenko (2) | (Hungary) Tímea Babos | 6–3, 6–2 |
| 2020 | cancelled due to the COVID-19 pandemic | | |

† – note: not considered the Taipei Open by some sources

=== Doubles ===
| Year | Champions | Runners-up | Score |
|---|---|---|---|
↓ ITF $50k Taoyuan event ↓
| †2007 | (Chinese Taipei) Chan Yung-jan (Chinese Taipei) Chan Hao-ching | (Chinese Taipei) Hsieh Shu-ying (Chinese Taipei) Hsieh Su-wei | 6–1, 2–6, [14–12] |
↓ $100k+H event ↓
| 2008 | (Chinese Taipei) Chuang Chia-jung (Chinese Taipei) Hsieh Su-wei | (Chinese Taipei) Hsu Wen-hsin (Chinese Taipei) Hwang I-hsuan | 6–3, 6–3 |
| 2009 | (Chinese Taipei) Chan Yung-jan (2) (Chinese Taipei) Chuang Chia-jung (2) | (Indonesia) Yayuk Basuki (United States) Riza Zalameda | 6–3, 3–6, [10–7] |
| 2010 | (Chinese Taipei) Chang Kai-chen (Chinese Taipei) Chuang Chia-jung (3) | (Chinese Taipei) Hsieh Su-wei (India) Sania Mirza | 6–4, 6–2 |
| 2011 | (Chinese Taipei) Chan Yung-jan (3) (China) Zheng Jie | (Czech Republic) Karolína Plíšková (Czech Republic) Kristýna Plíšková | 7–6^{(7–5)}, 5–7, [10–5] |
↓ WTA 125 event ↓
| 2012 | (Chinese Taipei) Chan Hao-ching (2) (France) Kristina Mladenovic | (Chinese Taipei) Chang Kai-chen (Belarus) Olga Govortsova | 5–7, 6–2, [10–8] |
| 2013 | (France) Caroline Garcia (Kazakhstan) Yaroslava Shvedova | (Germany) Anna-Lena Friedsam (Belgium) Alison Van Uytvanck | 6–3, 6–3 |
| 2014 | (Chinese Taipei) Chan Hao-ching (3) (Chinese Taipei) Chan Yung-jan (4) | (Chinese Taipei) Chang Kai-chen (Chinese Taipei) Chuang Chia-jung | 6–4, 6–3 |
| 2015 | (Japan) Kanae Hisami (Japan) Kotomi Takahata | (Russia) Marina Melnikova (Belgium) Elise Mertens | 6–1, 6–2 |
| 2016 | (Russia) Natela Dzalamidze (Russia) Veronika Kudermetova | (Chinese Taipei) Chang Kai-chen (Chinese Taipei) Chuang Chia-jung | 4–6, 6–3, [10–5] |
| 2017 | (Russia) Veronika Kudermetova (2) (Belarus) Aryna Sabalenka | (Australia) Monique Adamczak (United Kingdom) Naomi Broady | 2–6, 7–6^{(7–5)}, [10–6] |
| 2018 | (India) Ankita Raina (India) Karman Thandi | (Russia) Olga Doroshina (Russia) Natela Dzalamidze | 6–3, 5–7, [12–12] ret. |
| 2019 | (Chinese Taipei) Lee Ya-hsuan (Chinese Taipei) Wu Fang-hsien | (Slovenia) Dalila Jakupović (Montenegro) Danka Kovinić | 4–6, 6–4, [10–7] |
| 2020 | cancelled due to the COVID-19 pandemic | | |

† – note: not considered the Taipei Open by some sources

== See also ==
- List of sporting events in Taiwan
