= 2019 Kunming Open – Men's singles =

Men's singles
- 2019 Kunming Open

Final
- Champion: (United Kingdom) Jay Clarke
- Runner-up: (India) Prajnesh Gunneswaran
- Score: 6–4, 6–3

Events
Singles	men	women
Doubles	men	women
- Kunming Open

Prajnesh Gunneswaran was the defending champion but lost in the final to Jay Clarke.

Clarke won the title after defeating Gunneswaran 6–4, 6–3 in the final.

== Seeds ==
All seeds receive a bye into the second round.

1. (Australia) Jordan Thompson (third round)
2. (India) Prajnesh Gunneswaran (final)
3. (Poland) Kamil Majchrzak (semifinals)
4. (Chinese Taipei) Jason Jung (third round)
5. (India) Ramkumar Ramanathan (quarterfinals)
6. (Australia) Alex Bolt (quarterfinals)
7. (Austria) Dennis Novak (second round)
8. (Australia) Jason Kubler (third round)
9. (Australia) James Duckworth (quarterfinals)
10. (Serbia) Nikola Milojević (quarterfinals)
11. (Spain) Enrique López Pérez (third round)
12. (Kazakhstan) Aleksandr Nedovyesov (second round)
13. (France) Maxime Janvier (third round)
14. (United Kingdom) Jay Clarke (champion)
15. (Czech Republic) Adam Pavlásek (third round)
16. (China) Zhang Ze (second round)

== Draw ==
Key

- Q = Qualifier
- WC = Wild card
- LL = Lucky loser
- Alt = Alternate
- ITF = ITF entry
- PR = Protected ranking
- SR = Special ranking
- SE = Special exempt
- JE = Junior exempt
- JR = Junior Accelerator Programme entrant
- CO = College Accelerator Programme entrant
- NG = Next Gen Accelerator Program entrant
- w/o = Walkover
- r = Retired
- d = Defaulted

=== Finals ===
Quarterfinals
14	(United Kingdom) Jay Clarke	7	3	6
9	(Australia) James Duckworth	5	6	1
(Portugal) Gonçalo Oliveira	6^{5}	6	6
6	(Australia) Alex Bolt	7^{7}	4	3
5	(India) Ramkumar Ramanathan	1	6^{4}
3	(Poland) Kamil Majchrzak	6	7^{7}
10	(Serbia) Nikola Milojević	5	3
2	(India) Prajnesh Gunneswaran	7	6

Semifinals
14	(United Kingdom) Jay Clarke	6	6
(Portugal) Gonçalo Oliveira	3	2
3	(Poland) Kamil Majchrzak	6^{5}	7^{7}	4
2	(India) Prajnesh Gunneswaran	7^{7}	6^{3}	6

Final
14	(United Kingdom) Jay Clarke	6	6
2	(India) Prajnesh Gunneswaran	4	3

=== Top half ===
==== Section 1 ====
First round
(China) D Wu	4	6	2
(Australia) M Purcell	6	4	6
WC	(China) X Gao	3	1
(Italy) M Viola	6	6
Q	(Australia) Jacob Grills	6	6
WC	(China) Y He	1	4
(Japan) Makoto Ochi	6	7^{8}
WC	(China) Li Yuanfeng	2	6^{6}

Second round
1	(Australia) J Thompson	6	6
(Australia) M Purcell	3	4
(Italy) M Viola	4	3
14	(United Kingdom) J Clarke	6	6
9	(Australia) J Duckworth	6	6
Q	(Australia) J Grills	3	4
(Japan) M Ochi	2	1
8	(Australia) J Kubler	6	6

Third round
1	(Australia) J Thompson	5	6	2
14	(United Kingdom) J Clarke	7	2	6
9	(Australia) J Duckworth	7	7^{7}
8	(Australia) J Kubler	5	6^{5}

Quarterfinals
14	(United Kingdom) J Clarke	7	3	6
9	(Australia) J Duckworth	5	6	1

==== Section 2 ====
First round
(Belarus) U Ignatik	6	6
Alt	(Colombia) N Barrientos	2	2
(China) Xia Zihao	2	0
(Portugal) G Oliveira	6	6
(Australia) L Saville	3	6	6
(Australia) A Harris	6	4	4
(France) T Lamasine	4	7	5
(Japan) Y Uchiyama	6	5	7

Second round
4	(Chinese Taipei) J Jung	6	5	7
(Belarus) U Ignatik	3	7	5
(Portugal) G Oliveira	7^{10}	6
16	(China) Ze Zhang	6^{8}	3
11	(Spain) E López Pérez	6	6
(Australia) L Saville	3	4
(Japan) Y Uchiyama	6	6^{2}	4
6	(Australia) A Bolt	2	7^{7}	6

Third round
4	(Chinese Taipei) J Jung	3	6^{1}
(Portugal) G Oliveira	6	7^{7}
11	(Spain) E López Pérez	3	4
6	(Australia) A Bolt	6	6

Quarterfinals
(Portugal) G Oliveira	6^{5}	6	6
6	(Australia) A Bolt	7^{7}	4	3

=== Bottom half ===
==== Section 3 ====
First round
(India) S Mukund	1	4
(China) Y Bai	6	6
(Australia) A Santillan	7	6^{5}	0
(China) Zh Zhang	5	7^{7}	6
(Japan) K Uchida	7^{7}	3	1
(Chinese Taipei) T-h Yang	6^{3}	6	6
(Australia) M Banes	4	6	7^{7}
Q	(Israel) B Patael	6	3	6^{5}

Second round
5	(India) R Ramanathan	6	6
(China) Y Bai	4	4
(China) Zh Zhang	7^{7}	2	6
12	(Kazakhstan) A Nedovyesov	6^{1}	6	2
13	(France) M Janvier	6^{5}	7	7^{7}
(Chinese Taipei) T-h Yang	7^{7}	5	6^{2}
(Australia) M Banes	4	1
3	(Poland) K Majchrzak	6	6

Third round
5	(India) R Ramanathan	6	3	6
(China) Zh Zhang	3	6	3
13	(France) M Janvier	3	4
3	(Poland) K Majchrzak	6	6

Quarterfinals
5	(India) R Ramanathan	1	6^{4}
3	(Poland) K Majchrzak	6	7^{7}

==== Section 4 ====
First round
(Slovakia) A Martin	6	6
WC	(China) F Sun	3	1
(China) Z Li	6	7^{7}
(Chinese Taipei) T-l Wu	2	6^{5}
(South Korea) Y-s Chung	6	6
WC	(China) Liu Hanyi	1	3
(India) S Myneni	6	6
(Czech Republic) V Šafránek	2	4

Second round
7	(Austria) D Novak	1	1
(Slovakia) A Martin	6	6
(China) Z Li	4	3
10	(Serbia) N Milojević	6	6
15	(Czech Republic) A Pavlásek	7^{7}	3
(South Korea) Y-s Chung	6^{2}	1^{r}
(India) S Myneni	2	4
2	(India) P Gunneswaran	6	6

Third round
(Slovakia) A Martin	1	7^{7}	1
10	(Serbia) N Milojević	6	6^{0}	6
15	(Czech Republic) A Pavlásek	5	3
2	(India) P Gunneswaran	7	6

Quarterfinals
10	(Serbia) N Milojević	5	3
2	(India) P Gunneswaran	7	6
