= 2019 Kunming Open =

- Date: 15–21 April (ATP); 22–28 April (WTA)
- Edition: 8th (ATP); 2nd (WTA)
- Category: ATP Challenger Tour; WTA 125K series
- Prize money: $162,480+H (ATP) $125,000 (WTA)
- Surface: Clay
- Location: Anning, China

Champions

Men's singles
- (United Kingdom) Jay Clarke

Women's singles
- (China) Zheng Saisai

Men's doubles
- (Australia) Max Purcell / (Australia) Luke Saville

Women's doubles
- (China) Peng Shuai / (China) Yang Zhaoxuan
← 2018 ·	Kunming Open	· 2020 →

The 2019 Kunming Open was a professional tennis tournament played on outdoor clay courts. It was the eighth (ATP) and second (WTA) edition of the tournament and part of the 2019 ATP Challenger Tour and the 2019 WTA 125K series respectively. It took place in Anning, China, from 15–28 April 2019.

== Men's singles main draw entrants ==
=== Seeds ===
Country	Player	Rank^{1}	Seed
AUS	Jordan Thompson	67	1
IND	Prajnesh Gunneswaran	82	2
POL	Kamil Majchrzak	131	3
TPE	Jason Jung	134	4
IND	Ramkumar Ramanathan	141	5
AUS	Alex Bolt	145	6
AUT	Dennis Novak	156	7
AUS	Jason Kubler	159	8
AUS	James Duckworth	160	9
SRB	Nikola Milojević	183	10
ESP	Enrique López Pérez	185	11
KAZ	Aleksandr Nedovyesov	187	12
FRA	Maxime Janvier	202	13
GBR	Jay Clarke	209	14
CZE	Adam Pavlásek	211	15
CHN	Zhang Ze	213	16

- ^{1} Rankings as of 8 April 2019.

=== Other entrants ===
The following players received wildcards into the singles main draw:

- (China) Gao Xin
- (China) He Yecong
- (China) Li Yuanfeng
- (China) Liu Hanyi
- (China) Sun Fajing

The following player received entry into the singles main draw as an alternate:

- (Colombia) Nicolás Barrientos

The following players received entry from the qualifying draw:

- (Australia) Jacob Grills
- (Israel) Ben Patael

== Women's singles main draw entrants ==
=== Seeds ===
Country	Player	Rank^{1}	Seed
CHN	Zhang Shuai	42	1
CHN	Zheng Saisai	43	2
AUS	Samantha Stosur	77	3
CHN	Zhu Lin	94	4
CHN	Peng Shuai	120	5
RUS	Irina Khromacheva	137	6
USA	Danielle Lao	155	7
UZB	Sabina Sharipova	156	8

- ^{1} Rankings as of 15 April 2019.

=== Other entrants ===
The following players received wildcards into the singles main draw:

- (China) Duan Yingying
- (China) Ma Shuyue
- (China) Peng Shuai
- (China) Yang Zhaoxuan
- (China) Zhang Shuai
- (China) Zheng Saisai

The following player received entry using a protected ranking:

- (China) Gao Xinyu

The following players received entry from the qualifying draw:

- (Japan) Miharu Imanishi
- (Australia) Kaylah McPhee
- (Japan) Chihiro Muramatsu
- (Thailand) Peangtarn Plipuech

The following player received entry as a lucky loser:

- (Japan) Miyabi Inoue

=== Withdrawals ===
- (Israel) Deniz Khazaniuk → replaced by (Japan) Miyabi Inoue

=== Retirements ===
- (Russia) Irina Khromacheva (fever)
- (United States) Danielle Lao (right lower leg injury)
- (Uzbekistan) Sabina Sharipova (gastro-intestinal illness)
- (China) Zhang Kailin (low back injury)

== Women's doubles main draw entrants ==
=== Seeds ===
Country	Player	Country	Player	Rank^{1}	Seed
CHN	Duan Yingying	CHN	Han Xinyun	137	1
CHN	Peng Shuai	CHN	Yang Zhaoxuan	166	2
~~RUS~~	~~Olga Doroshina~~	~~RUS~~	~~Irina Khromacheva~~	~~199~~	~~3~~
CHN	Jiang Xinyu	CHN	Tang Qianhui	260	4

- Rankings are as of 15 April 2019

=== Other entrants ===
The following pair received entry as alternates:

- (Australia) Maddison Inglis / (Japan) Miyabi Inoue

=== Withdrawals ===
- (Russia) Irina Khromacheva (viral illness)

=== Retirements ===
- (United States) Ashley Kratzer (left shoulder injury)

== Champions ==
=== Men's singles ===
- (United Kingdom) Jay Clarke def. (India) Prajnesh Gunneswaran 6–4, 6–3

=== Women's singles ===
- (China) Zheng Saisai def. (China) Zhang Shuai 6–4, 6–1

=== Men's doubles ===
- (Australia) Max Purcell / (Australia) Luke Saville def. (Netherlands) David Pel / (Chile) Hans Podlipnik Castillo 4–6, 7–5, [10–5]

=== Women's doubles ===
- (China) Peng Shuai / (China) Yang Zhaoxuan def. (China) Duan Yingying / (China) Han Xinyun 7–5, 6–2
