= 2011 OEC Taipei Ladies Open – Doubles =

Doubles
- 2011 OEC Taipei Ladies Open

Final
- Champions: (Chinese Taipei) Chan Yung-jan (China) Zheng Jie
- Runners-up: (Czech Republic) Karolína Plíšková (Czech Republic) Kristýna Plíšková
- Score: 7–6^{(7–5)}, 5–7, [10–5]

Events
Singles	Doubles
- OEC Taipei Ladies Open

Chang Kai-chen and Chuang Chia-jung were the defending champions, but both chose to participate, but with different partners. Chang competed with Hsieh Shu-ying, but lost in the first round to Chen Yi and Varatchaya Wongteanchai, meanwhile Chuang competed with Olga Govortsova, but lost in the quarterfinals to Karolína Plíšková and Kristýna Plíšková.

Chan Yung-jan and Zheng Jie won the title defeating Karolína Plíšková and Kristýna Plíšková in the final 7–6^{(7–5)}, 5–7, [10–5].

== Seeds ==
1. (Chinese Taipei) Chan Yung-jan / (China) Zheng Jie (champions)
2. (Chinese Taipei) Chuang Chia-jung / (Belarus) Olga Govortsova (quarterfinals)
3. (Chinese Taipei) Hsieh Su-wei / (China) Zheng Saisai (quarterfinals)
4. (United States) Jill Craybas / (Thailand) Tamarine Tanasugarn (semifinals)

== Draw ==
Key

- Q = Qualifier
- WC = Wild card
- LL = Lucky loser
- Alt = Alternate
- ITF = ITF entry
- PR = Protected ranking
- SR = Special ranking
- SE = Special exempt
- JE = Junior exempt
- JR = Junior Accelerator Programme entrant
- CO = College Accelerator Programme entrant
- NG = Next Gen Accelerator Program entrant
- w/o = Walkover
- r = Retired
- d = Defaulted

=== Draw ===
First round
1	(Chinese Taipei) Y-j Chan (China) J Zheng	6	6
(Hungary) K Marosi (Japan) Y Sema	3	2
(Chinese Taipei) H-c Chan (Thailand) N Lertcheewakarn	4	2
WC	(Japan) M Doi (Japan) R Fujiwara	6	6
4	(United States) J Craybas (Thailand) T Tanasugarn	6	6
(Thailand) N Lertpitaksinchai (Thailand) P Pliphuech	1	2
(Chinese Taipei) Y Chen (Thailand) V Wongteanchai	6	6
(Chinese Taipei) K-c Chang (Chinese Taipei) S-y Hsieh	4	4
WC	(Chinese Taipei) T-f Juan (Chinese Taipei) H-c Lee	3	3
(Indonesia) A-F Damayanti (Indonesia) J Rompies	6	6
WC	(Chinese Taipei) W-h Hsu (China) W Liu	5	4
3	(Chinese Taipei) S-w Hsieh (China) S Zheng	7	6
(Czech Republic) Ka Plíšková (Czech Republic) Kr Plíšková	6	7
(Australia) M Adamczak (Japan) K Iijima	3	5
(Chinese Taipei) C-w Chan (Chinese Taipei) S-y Kao	3	2
2	(Chinese Taipei) C-j Chuang (Belarus) O Govortsova	6	6

Quarterfinals
1	(Chinese Taipei) Y-j Chan (China) J Zheng	6	0	[10]
WC	(Japan) M Doi (Japan) R Fujiwara	2	6	[8]
4	(United States) J Craybas (Thailand) T Tanasugarn	6	2	[10]
(Chinese Taipei) Y Chen (Thailand) V Wongteanchai	2	6	[5]
(Indonesia) A-F Damayanti (Indonesia) J Rompies	6	3	[12]
3	(Chinese Taipei) S-w Hsieh (China) S Zheng	4	6	[10]
(Czech Republic) Ka Plíšková (Czech Republic) Kr Plíšková	6	6
2	(Chinese Taipei) C-j Chuang (Belarus) O Govortsova	4	3

Semifinals
1	(Chinese Taipei) Y-j Chan (China) J Zheng	6	6
4	(United States) J Craybas (Thailand) T Tanasugarn	3	4
(Indonesia) A-F Damayanti (Indonesia) J Rompies	5	1
(Czech Republic) Ka Plíšková (Czech Republic) Kr Plíšková	7	6

Finals
1	(Chinese Taipei) Y-j Chan (China) J Zheng	7^{7}	5	[10]
(Czech Republic) Ka Plíšková (Czech Republic) Kr Plíšková	6^{5}	7	[5]
