= 2019 OEC Taipei WTA Challenger – Doubles =

Doubles
- 2019 OEC Taipei WTA Challenger

Final
- Champions: (Chinese Taipei) Lee Ya-hsuan (Chinese Taipei) Wu Fang-hsien
- Runners-up: (Slovenia) Dalila Jakupović (Montenegro) Danka Kovinić
- Score: 4–6, 6–4, [10–7]

Events
Singles	Doubles
- OEC Taipei WTA Challenger

Ankita Raina and Karman Thandi were the defending champions but Thandi chose not to participate. Raina partnered alongside Bibiane Schoofs, but lost in the quarterfinals to Lee Ya-hsuan and Wu Fang-hsien.

Lee and Wu went on to win the title, defeating Dalila Jakupović and Danka Kovinić in the final, 4–6, 6–4, [10–7].

== Seeds ==
1. (Australia) Arina Rodionova / (Australia) Storm Sanders (semifinals)
2. (Slovenia) Dalila Jakupović / (Montenegro) Danka Kovinić (final)
3. (India) Ankita Raina / (Netherlands) Bibiane Schoofs (quarterfinals)
4. (Russia) Yana Sizikova / (United Kingdom) Emily Webley-Smith (first round, retired)

== Draw ==
Key

- Q = Qualifier
- WC = Wild card
- LL = Lucky loser
- Alt = Alternate
- ITF = ITF entry
- PR = Protected ranking
- SR = Special ranking
- SE = Special exempt
- JE = Junior exempt
- JR = Junior Accelerator Programme entrant
- CO = College Accelerator Programme entrant
- NG = Next Gen Accelerator Program entrant
- w/o = Walkover
- r = Retired
- d = Defaulted

=== Draw ===
First round
1	(Australia) Ar Rodionova (Australia) S Sanders	6	6
(Hong Kong) E Chong (Indonesia) A Sutjiadi	2	2
(Russia) N Dzalamidze (Russia) K Rakhimova	6	6
(Chinese Taipei) C-w Hsu (Chinese Taipei) Ya-hsi Lee	4	3
3	(India) A Raina (Netherlands) B Schoofs	6	7^{7}
(Switzerland) S Bandecchi (Germany) S-R Sekulic	4	6^{4}
(Chinese Taipei) Ya-hsu Lee (Chinese Taipei) F-h Wu	6	6
WC	(Chinese Taipei) J Garland (Chinese Taipei) Y-y Yang	3	0
(Bulgaria) I Shinikova (India) P Thombare	7	6
(Germany) J Jebawy (United States) A Riley	5	3
(Chinese Taipei) I-h Cho (Chinese Taipei) Y-t Cho	6	3
4	(Russia) Y Sizikova (United Kingdom) E Webley-Smith	1	0^{r}
(United Kingdom) N Bains (France) A Hesse	6	6
(Chinese Taipei) P-h Chen (Chinese Taipei) Y-c Hsieh	3	4
(Japan) K Okamura (Thailand) P Plipuech	6	6^{5}	[7]
2	(Slovenia) D Jakupović (Montenegro) D Kovinić	2	7^{7}	[10]

Quarterfinals
1	(Australia) Ar Rodionova (Australia) S Sanders	6	6
(Russia) N Dzalamidze (Russia) K Rakhimova	3	3
3	(India) A Raina (Netherlands) B Schoofs	6	3	[9]
(Chinese Taipei) Ya-hsu Lee (Chinese Taipei) F-h Wu	3	6	[11]
(Bulgaria) I Shinikova (India) P Thombare	3	4
(Chinese Taipei) I-h Cho (Chinese Taipei) Y-t Cho	6	6
(United Kingdom) N Bains (France) A Hesse	6^{5}	4
2	(Slovenia) D Jakupović (Montenegro) D Kovinić	7^{7}	6

Semifinals
1	(Australia) Ar Rodionova (Australia) S Sanders	3	4
(Chinese Taipei) Ya-hsu Lee (Chinese Taipei) F-h Wu	6	6
(Chinese Taipei) I-h Cho (Chinese Taipei) Y-t Cho	4	4
2	(Slovenia) D Jakupović (Montenegro) D Kovinić	6	6

Final
(Chinese Taipei) Ya-hsu Lee (Chinese Taipei) F-h Wu	4	6	[10]
2	(Slovenia) D Jakupović (Montenegro) D Kovinić	6	4	[7]
