= 2019 Abierto Zapopan – Doubles =

Doubles
- 2019 Abierto Zapopan

Final
- Champions: (United States) Maria Sanchez (Hungary) Fanny Stollár
- Runners-up: (Sweden) Cornelia Lister (Czech Republic) Renata Voráčová
- Score: 7–5, 6–1

Events
Singles	Doubles
- Abierto Zapopan

This was the first edition of the tournament.

Maria Sanchez and Fanny Stollár won the title, defeating Cornelia Lister and Renata Voráčová in the final, 7–5, 6–1.

== Seeds ==
1. (Japan) Miyu Kato / (Japan) Makoto Ninomiya (semifinals)
2. (Japan) Nao Hibino / (United States) Desirae Krawczyk (first round)
3. (Chile) Alexa Guarachi / (United States) Sabrina Santamaria (first round)
4. (Russia) Anna Blinkova / (Russia) Alexandra Panova (first round)

== Draw ==
Key

- Q = Qualifier
- WC = Wild card
- LL = Lucky loser
- Alt = Alternate
- ITF = ITF entry
- PR = Protected ranking
- SR = Special ranking
- SE = Special exempt
- JE = Junior exempt
- JR = Junior Accelerator Programme entrant
- CO = College Accelerator Programme entrant
- NG = Next Gen Accelerator Program entrant
- w/o = Walkover
- r = Retired
- d = Defaulted

First round
1	(Japan) M Kato (Japan) M Ninomiya	6	4	[10]
(Spain) L Arruabarrena (Poland) P Kania	2	6	[6]
(Canada) S Fichman (Hungary) RL Jani	7	6
(Mexico) G Olmos (Brazil) L Pigossi	5	2
4	(Russia) A Blinkova (Russia) A Panova	4	6^{4}
(United States) M Sanchez (Hungary) F Stollár	6	7^{7}
(Italy) S Errani (Georgia (country)) O Kalashnikova	6^{8}	6	[5]
(Serbia) O Danilović (Serbia) N Kostić	7^{10}	2	[10]
(United States) H Carter (United States) E Shibahara	6	3	[4]
(Russia) V Kudermetova (Luxembourg) M Minella	4	6	[10]
(United States) J Cako (Mexico) R Zarazúa	7	6
3	(Chile) A Guarachi (United States) S Santamaria	5	4
WC	(Switzerland) C Perrin (Russia) S Zhuk	1	6	[4]
(Sweden) C Lister (Czech Republic) R Voráčová	6	4
(Kazakhstan) A Danilina (New Zealand) E Routliffe	7	6
2	(Japan) N Hibino (United States) D Krawczyk	5	4

Quarterfinals
1	(Japan) M Kato (Japan) M Ninomiya	6	3	[10]
(Canada) S Fichman (Hungary) RL Jani	4	6	[4]
(United States) M Sanchez (Hungary) F Stollár	6	7
(Serbia) O Danilović (Serbia) N Kostić	2	5
(Russia) V Kudermetova (Luxembourg) M Minella	2^{r}
(United States) J Cako (Mexico) R Zarazúa	3
(Sweden) C Lister (Czech Republic) R Voráčová	6	7
(Kazakhstan) A Danilina (New Zealand) E Routliffe	2	5

Semifinals
1	(Japan) M Kato (Japan) M Ninomiya	3	5
(United States) M Sanchez (Hungary) F Stollár	6	7
(United States) J Cako (Mexico) R Zarazúa	7^{7}	2	[8]
(Sweden) C Lister (Czech Republic) R Voráčová	6^{3}	6	[10]

Final
(United States) M Sanchez (Hungary) F Stollár	7	6
(Sweden) C Lister (Czech Republic) R Voráčová	5	1
