= 2019 Abierto Zapopan – Singles =

Singles
- 2019 Abierto Zapopan

Final
- Champion: (Russia) Veronika Kudermetova
- Runner-up: (Czech Republic) Marie Bouzková
- Score: 6–2, 6–0

Events
Singles	Doubles
- Abierto Zapopan

This was the first edition of the tournament.

Unseeded Veronika Kudermetova won the title, defeating Marie Bouzková 6–2, 6–0 in the final.

== Seeds ==
1. (France) Alizé Cornet (first round)
2. (Slovakia) Anna Karolína Schmiedlová (second round)
3. (Germany) Tatjana Maria (semifinals)
4. (Romania) Irina-Camelia Begu (first round)
5. (Russia) Evgeniya Rodina (first round)
6. (Spain) Lara Arruabarrena (first round)
7. (Czech Republic) Kristýna Plíšková (quarterfinals)
8. (Poland) Magda Linette (quarterfinals)

== Draw ==
Key

- Q = Qualifier
- WC = Wild card
- LL = Lucky loser
- Alt = Alternate
- ITF = ITF entry
- PR = Protected ranking
- SR = Special ranking
- SE = Special exempt
- JE = Junior exempt
- JR = Junior Accelerator Programme entrant
- CO = College Accelerator Programme entrant
- NG = Next Gen Accelerator Program entrant
- w/o = Walkover
- r = Retired
- d = Defaulted

=== Finals ===
Semifinals
(Russia) Veronika Kudermetova	6	6
3	(Germany) Tatjana Maria	2	2
(Czech Republic) Marie Bouzková	6	6^{4}	6
(France) Fiona Ferro	3	7^{7}	0

Final
(Russia) Veronika Kudermetova	6	6
(Czech Republic) Marie Bouzková	2	0

=== Top half ===
First round
1	(France) A Cornet	3	0
WC	(Russia) S Zhuk	6	6
(Russia) V Kudermetova	4	7	6
LL	(Ukraine) K Zavatska	6	5	4
(Romania) A Bogdan	1	3
(Belgium) Y Wickmayer	6	6
Q	(China) Xiy Wang	4	4
7	(Czech Republic) Kr Plíšková	6	6
3	(Germany) T Maria	6	4
(Kazakhstan) Z Diyas	2	4^{r}
(United Kingdom) H Watson	4	1
(Japan) N Hibino	6	6
LL	(Spain) P Badosa Gibert	4	5
(Serbia) O Danilović	6	7
(Russia) A Blinkova	6	6
5	(Russia) E Rodina	2	4

Second round
WC	(Russia) S Zhuk	4	6	1
(Russia) V Kudermetova	6	0	6
(Belgium) Y Wickmayer	6	4	6^{2}
7	(Czech Republic) Kr Plíšková	4	6	7^{7}
3	(Germany) T Maria	6	6
(Japan) N Hibino	4	3
(Serbia) O Danilović	6	3	6
(Russia) A Blinkova	1	6	1

Quarterfinals
(Russia) V Kudermetova	3	7^{7}	6
7	(Czech Republic) Kr Plíšková	6	6^{4}	2
3	(Germany) T Maria	3	7^{7}	6
(Serbia) O Danilović	6	6^{3}	3

Semifinals
(Russia) V Kudermetova	6	6
3	(Germany) T Maria	2	2

=== Bottom half ===
First round
6	(Spain) L Arruabarrena	4	4
(Czech Republic) M Bouzková	6	6
(Russia) V Diatchenko	6	2	6
(Ukraine) A Kalinina	1	6	0
(Hungary) F Stollár	1	4
WC	(Mexico) R Zarazúa	6	6
(Italy) S Errani	6	7^{8}
4	(Romania) I-C Begu	3	6^{6}
8	(Poland) M Linette	6	6
Q	(Serbia) N Kostić	1	3
Q	(United States) V Lepchenko	3	2
Q	(Switzerland) C Perrin	6	6
(France) F Ferro	7	6
WC	(Mexico) G Olmos	5	1
(Luxembourg) M Minella	3	3
2	(Slovakia) AK Schmiedlová	6	6

Second round
(Czech Republic) M Bouzková	6	6
(Russia) V Diatchenko	3	3
WC	(Mexico) R Zarazúa	6	6
(Italy) S Errani	1	4
8	(Poland) M Linette	6	5	6
Q	(Switzerland) C Perrin	3	7	1
(France) F Ferro	6	6
2	(Slovakia) AK Schmiedlová	4	1

Quarterfinals
(Czech Republic) M Bouzková	7^{10}	6
WC	(Mexico) R Zarazúa	6^{8}	2
8	(Poland) M Linette	6	2	4
(France) F Ferro	4	6	6

Semifinals
(Czech Republic) M Bouzková	6	6^{4}	6
(France) F Ferro	3	7^{7}	0

== Qualifying ==
=== Seeds ===
1. (Ukraine) Anhelina Kalinina (moved to main draw)
2. (Spain) Paula Badosa Gibert (qualifying competition, lucky loser)
3. (Czech Republic) Marie Bouzková (moved to main draw)
4. (United States) Varvara Lepchenko (qualified)
5. (Switzerland) Conny Perrin (qualified)
6. (Australia) Astra Sharma (withdrew, still competing in ITF Irapuato)
7. (Ukraine) Katarina Zavatska (qualifying competition, lucky loser)
8. (United Kingdom) Katie Swan (withdrew, still competing in ITF Irapuato)

=== Qualifiers ===
1. (Serbia) Natalija Kostić
2. (China) Wang Xiyu
3. (Switzerland) Conny Perrin
4. (United States) Varvara Lepchenko

=== Lucky losers ===
1. (Spain) Paula Badosa Gibert
2. (Ukraine) Katarina Zavatska

=== Draw ===
==== First qualifier ====
First round
Alt	(Georgia (country)) Oksana Kalashnikova	4	1
(Serbia) Natalija Kostić	6	6
(China) Xu Shilin	4	4
7	(Ukraine) Katarina Zavatska	6	6

Qualifying competition
(Serbia) Natalija Kostić	6	6
7	(Ukraine) Katarina Zavatska	4	3

==== Second qualifier ====
First round
2	(Spain) Paula Badosa Gibert	6	6
(Hungary) Réka Luca Jani	4	2
(China) Wang Xiyu	6	5	6
Alt	(Chile) Alexa Guarachi	4	7	4

Qualifying competition
2	(Spain) Paula Badosa Gibert	2	2
(China) Wang Xiyu	6	6

==== Third qualifier ====
First round
Alt	(Brazil) Laura Pigossi	7	6^{5}	7
Alt	(Sweden) Cornelia Lister	5	7^{7}	5
(Canada) Françoise Abanda
5	(Switzerland) Conny Perrin	w/o

Qualifying competition
Alt	(Brazil) Laura Pigossi	6	1	2
5	(Switzerland) Conny Perrin	3	6	6

==== Fourth qualifier ====
First round
4	(United States) Varvara Lepchenko	6	6
(Kazakhstan) Anna Danilina	2	3
(Venezuela) Andrea Gámiz	6	4	7
Alt	(United States) Jacqueline Cako	2	6	5

Qualifying competition
4	(United States) Varvara Lepchenko	6	6
(Venezuela) Andrea Gámiz	2	2
