= 2019 Kunming Open – Women's singles =

Women's singles
- 2019 Kunming Open

Final
- Champion: (China) Zheng Saisai
- Runner-up: (China) Zhang Shuai
- Score: 6–4, 6–1

Events
Singles	men	women
Doubles	men	women
← 2018 ·	Kunming Open	· 2020 →

Irina Khromacheva was the defending champion, but retired in the first round against Yang Zhaoxuan.

Zheng Saisai won the title, defeating Zhang Shuai in the final, 6–4, 6–1.

== Seeds ==
1. (China) Zhang Shuai (final)
2. (China) Zheng Saisai (champion)
3. (Australia) Samantha Stosur (first round)
4. (China) Zhu Lin (second round)
5. (China) Peng Shuai (first round)
6. (Russia) Irina Khromacheva (first round, retired)
7. (United States) Danielle Lao (second round, retired)
8. (Uzbekistan) Sabina Sharipova (first round, retired)

== Draw ==
=== Key ===
- Q = Qualifier
- WC = Wild card
- LL = Lucky loser
- Alt = Alternate
- SE = Special exempt
- PR = Protected ranking
- ITF = ITF entry
- JE = Junior exempt
- w/o = Walkover
- r = Retired
- d = Defaulted
- SR = Special ranking

=== Finals ===
Semifinals
1/WC	(China) Zhang Shuai	6	2	6
(Chinese Taipei) Liang En-shuo	4	6	1
Q	(Australia) Kaylah McPhee	6	0	1
2/WC	(China) Zheng Saisai	3	6	6

Final
1/WC	(China) Zhang Shuai	4	1
2/WC	(China) Zheng Saisai	6	6

=== Top half ===
First round
1/WC	(China) S Zhang	4	6	6
(Bulgaria) E Kostova	6	2	1
(China) F Xun	6	2	6
(Romania) A Roșca	3	6	2
(China) S Xu	5	1
WC	(China) S Ma	7	6
WC	(China) Y Duan	1	2
7	(United States) D Lao	6	6
3	(Australia) S Stosur	5	6	5
(India) A Raina	7	2	7
(China) K Zhang	7^{7}	6
(Japan) H Kuwata	6^{3}	3
(Chinese Taipei) E-s Liang	6	6
PR	(China) X Gao	2	3
WC	(China) Z Yang	6	3
6	(Russia) I Khromacheva	3	2^{r}

Second round
1/WC	(China) S Zhang	2	6	6
(China) F Xun	6	2	1
WC	(China) S Ma	6	5
7	(United States) D Lao	4	0^{r}
(India) A Raina	6	6^{2}	6^{7}
(China) K Zhang	1	7^{7}	7^{9}
(Chinese Taipei) E-s Liang	6	7^{8}
WC	(China) Z Yang	2	6^{6}

Quarterfinals
1/WC	(China) S Zhang	7	6
WC	(China) S Ma	5	2
(China) K Zhang	6^{1}	1^{r}
(Chinese Taipei) E-s Liang	7^{7}	4

Semifinals
1/WC	(China) S Zhang	6	2	6
(Chinese Taipei) E-s Liang	4	6	1

=== Bottom half ===
First round
8	(Uzbekistan) S Sharipova	1	0^{r}
Q	(Australia) K McPhee	6	3
(United States) A Kratzer	1	6	6
(China) X Han	6	1	2
(France) A Hesse	6	3	4
Q	(Japan) C Muramatsu	2	6	6
(China) Y Zhang	2	6	3
4	(China) L Zhu	6	3	6
5/WC	(China) S Peng	4	6	3
(Romania) A Cadanțu	6	1	6
Q	(Japan) M Imanishi	6	6
(Russia) O Doroshina	2	2
(Slovakia) J Čepelová	6	7^{12}
LL	(Japan) M Inoue	4	6^{10}
Q	(Thailand) P Plipuech	6^{7}	1
2/WC	(China) S Zheng	7^{9}	6

Second round
Q	(Australia) K McPhee	6	6
(United States) A Kratzer	4	2
Q	(Japan) C Muramatsu	7^{7}	6
4	(China) L Zhu	6^{5}	4
(Romania) A Cadanțu	1	6	6
Q	(Japan) M Imanishi	6	1	1
(Slovakia) J Čepelová	2	1
2/WC	(China) S Zheng	6	6

Quarterfinals
Q	(Australia) K McPhee	6	6
Q	(Japan) C Muramatsu	2	4
(Romania) A Cadanțu	1	4
2/WC	(China) S Zheng	6	6

Semifinals
Q	(Australia) K McPhee	6	0	1
2/WC	(China) S Zheng	3	6	6

== Qualifying ==
=== Seeds ===
1. (Japan) Hiroko Kuwata (moved to main draw)
2. (Russia) Marina Melnikova (first round)
3. (Japan) Miharu Imanishi (qualified)
4. (Thailand) Peangtarn Plipuech (qualified)
5. (Australia) Kaylah McPhee (qualified)
6. (Japan) Miyabi Inoue (qualifying competition, lucky loser)
7. (China) You Xiaodi (qualifying competition)
8. (Australia) Alison Bai (qualifying competition)

=== Qualifiers ===
1. (Australia) Kaylah McPhee
2. (Japan) Chihiro Muramatsu
3. (Japan) Miharu Imanishi
4. (Thailand) Peangtarn Plipuech

=== Lucky loser ===
1. (Japan) Miyabi Inoue

=== Qualifying draw ===
==== First qualifier ====
First round
Alt	(Russia) Nika Kukharchuk	6^{0}	2
(Australia) Maddison Inglis	7^{7}	6
(China) Yuan Yue	4	3
5	(Australia) Kaylah McPhee	6	6

Qualifying competition
(Australia) Maddison Inglis	6	4	3
5	(Australia) Kaylah McPhee	2	6	6

==== Second qualifier ====
First round
2	(Russia) Marina Melnikova	2	5
(Japan) Chihiro Muramatsu	6	7
WC	(China) Guo Hanyu	6	4	0
6	(Japan) Miyabi Inoue	3	6	6

Qualifying competition
(Japan) Chihiro Muramatsu	7^{7}	7^{8}
6	(Japan) Miyabi Inoue	6^{3}	6^{6}

==== Third qualifier ====
First round
3	(Japan) Miharu Imanishi	6	6
(Japan) Mai Hontama	0	2
(Australia) Olivia Tjandramulia	1	6	5
8	(Australia) Alison Bai	6	1	7

Qualifying competition
3	(Japan) Miharu Imanishi	6	6
8	(Australia) Alison Bai	3	3

==== Fourth qualifier ====
First round
4	(Thailand) Peangtarn Plipuech	3	6	6
(Germany) Sarah-Rebecca Sekulic	6	4	1
WC	(China) Chen Mengyi	1	2
7	(China) You Xiaodi	6	6

Qualifying competition
4	(Thailand) Peangtarn Plipuech	6	3	6
7	(China) You Xiaodi	4	6	4
