= 2019 Kunming Open – Women's doubles =

Women's doubles
- 2019 Kunming Open

Final
- Champions: (China) Peng Shuai (China) Yang Zhaoxuan
- Runners-up: (China) Duan Yingying (China) Han Xinyun
- Score: 7–5, 6–2

Events
Singles	men	women
Doubles	men	women
← 2018 ·	Kunming Open	· 2020 →

Dalila Jakupović and Irina Khromacheva are the defending champions, however Jakupović chose not to participate. Khromacheva was scheduled to partner countrywoman Olga Doroshina, but the pair withdrew after Khromacheva sustained a viral illness.

Peng Shuai and Yang Zhaoxuan won the title, defeating Duan Yingying and Han Xinyun 7–5, 6–2 in the final.

== Seeds ==
1. (China) Duan Yingying / (China) Han Xinyun (final)
2. (China) Peng Shuai / (China) Yang Zhaoxuan (champions)
3. (Russia) Olga Doroshina / (Russia) Irina Khromacheva (withdrew)
4. (China) Jiang Xinyu / (China) Tang Qianhui (first round)

== Draw ==
=== Key ===
- Q = Qualifier
- WC = Wild card
- LL = Lucky loser
- Alt = Alternate
- SE = Special exempt
- PR = Protected ranking
- ITF = ITF entry
- JE = Junior exempt
- w/o = Walkover
- r = Retired
- d = Defaulted
- SR = Special ranking

=== Draw ===
First round
1	(China) Y Duan (China) X Han	6	4	[10]
(Australia) K McPhee (Australia) O Tjandramulia	3	6	[6]
(Hong Kong) K-y Ng (China) S Zheng	6	5	[3]
(Romania) A Cadanțu (Uzbekistan) S Sharipova	4	7	[10]
4	(China) X Jiang (China) Q Tang	7	4	[6]
(United States) A Kratzer (India) A Raina	5	6	[10]
(Australia) A Bai (Bulgaria) E Kostova	2	6	[3]
Alt	(Australia) M Inglis (Japan) M Inoue	6	3	[10]
(Romania) A Roșca (China) S Xu	5	6	[10]
(China) S Feng (China) J Kang	7	3	[8]
(China) F Xun (China) L Zhu	4	1
(Indonesia) B Gumulya (China) X You	6	6
(Japan) H Kuwata (Thailand) P Plipuech	5	0
(Indonesia) J Rompies (Netherlands) R van der Hoek	7	6
(China) H Guo (China) X Sun	2	3
2	(China) S Peng (China) Z Yang	6	6

Quarterfinals
1	(China) Y Duan (China) X Han	6	4	[10]
(Romania) A Cadanțu (Uzbekistan) S Sharipova	2	6	[8]
(United States) A Kratzer (India) A Raina
Alt	(Australia) M Inglis (Japan) M Inoue	w/o
(Romania) A Roșca (China) S Xu	6	4	[10]
(Indonesia) B Gumulya (China) X You	4	6	[7]
(Indonesia) J Rompies (Netherlands) R van der Hoek	3	4
2	(China) S Peng (China) Z Yang	6	6

Semifinals
1	(China) Y Duan (China) X Han	6	1	[10]
Alt	(Australia) M Inglis (Japan) M Inoue	2	6	[4]
(Romania) A Roșca (China) S Xu	1	5
2	(China) S Peng (China) Z Yang	6	7

Final
1	(China) Y Duan (China) X Han	5	2
2	(China) S Peng (China) Z Yang	7	6
