= Wu Fang-hsien =

Taiwanese tennis player (born 1999)

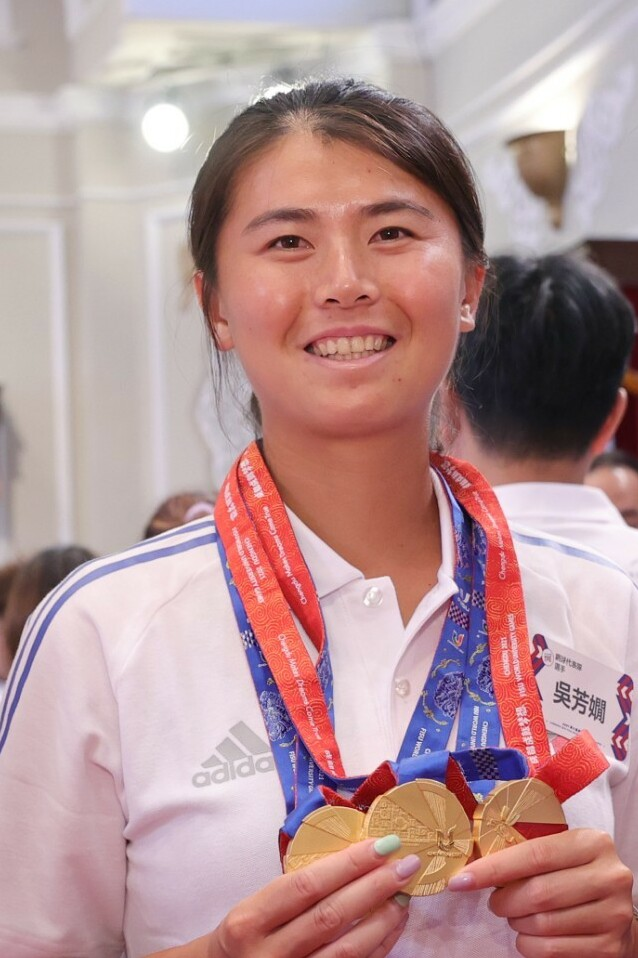
- Wu in 2023
- Country (sports): Chinese Taipei
- Born: 15 July 1999 (age 27)
- Plays: Right.handed
- Prize money: $630,811

Singles
- Career record: 19–20
- Career titles: 0

Doubles
- Career record: 233–139
- Career titles: 4
- Highest ranking: No. 27 (8 September 2025)
- Current ranking: No. 53 (15 June 2026)

Grand Slam doubles results
- Australian Open: QF (2026)
- French Open: 2R (2023, 2025, 2026)
- Wimbledon: 3R (2023)
- US Open: 3R (2025, 2026)

Grand Slam mixed doubles results
- French Open: 1R (2025)
- Wimbledon: 1R (2025)
Medal record
Women's tennis
Representing Chinese Taipei
Asian Games
Silver medal – second place	2026 Aichi-Nagoya	Doubles
World University Games
Gold medal – first place	2021 Chengdu	Doubles
Gold medal – first place	2021 Chengdu	Mixed
Gold medal – first place	2021 Chengdu	Team
- Last updated on: 15 June 2026.

Wu Fang-hsien (Chinese: 吳芳嫺; pinyin: Wú Fāngxián; born 15 July 1999) is a Taiwanese tennis player who specializes in doubles. She has a career-high WTA ranking in doubles of No. 27, achieved 8 September 2025. Wu has won three WTA Tour doubles titles.

== Career ==
=== 2018-2020: WTA Tour and major debuts ===
Wu made her WTA Tour main-draw debut at the 2018 Washington Open in doubles, partnering with Chen Pei-hsuan.

She made her Grand Slam tournament debut at the 2020 Australian Open, partnering Lee Ya-hsuan. They lost against Bethanie Mattek-Sands and Sofia Kenin in the first round.

=== 2023-2024: Maiden WTA Tour title, top 50 ===
She reached the top 100 following her maiden WTA Tour title at the 2023 Thailand Open, partnering with Chan Hao-ching, moving close to 50 positions up to world No. 99 on 6 February 2023.

Partnering Ingrid Neel, she recorded her first major win, against Nadiia Kichenok and Anna-Lena Friedsam at the 2023 French Open. She reached the third round at the 2023 Wimbledon Championships, partnering with Zhu Lin.

She also reached the third round at the 2024 Australian Open partnering Zhu Lin, defeating seventh seeds Nicole Melichar-Martinez and Ellen Perez on the way, and reached the top 50 in the rankings on 29 January 2024.

=== 2025: Back-to-back titles, WTA 1000 final, top 30 ===
Partnering Jiang Xinyu, Wu won the doubles title at the Auckland Open, defeating Aleksandra Krunić and Sabrina Santamaria in the final. The following week, the pair won the Hobart International doubles title, overcoming Monica Niculescu and Fanny Stollár in the final.

In February, Wu and Jiang reached the final at the WTA 1000 Qatar Ladies Open, losing to Sara Errani and Jasmine Paolini in straight sets. At the WTA 1000 Miami Open, the pair reached the semifinals again defeating Asia Muhammad and Demi Schuurs, Ashlyn Krueger and Jessica Pegula by retirement and the Chinese pair of Zheng Saisai and Wang Xinyu.

== WTA Tour finals ==
=== Doubles: 7 (4 titles, 3 runner-ups) ===
Legend WTA 1000 (0–1) WTA 500 (0–1) WTA 250 (4–1)	Finals by surface Hard (4–3) Clay (0–0) Grass (0–0)

Result	W–L	Date	Tournament	Tier	Surface	Partner	Opponents	Score
Win	1–0	Feb 2023	Hua Hin Championships, Thailand	WTA 250	Hard	(Chinese Taipei) Chan Hao-ching	(China) Wang Xinyu (China) Zhu Lin	6–1, 7–6^{(8–6)}
Loss	1–1	Feb 2023	Mérida Open, Mexico	WTA 250	Hard	(China) Wang Xinyu	(United States) Caty McNally (France) Diane Parry	0–6, 5–7
Loss	1–2	Aug 2024	Washington Open, United States	WTA 500	Hard	(China) Jiang Xinyu	(United States) Taylor Townsend (United States) Asia Muhammad	6–7^{(0–7)}, 3–6
Win	2–2	Jan 2025	Auckland Open, New Zealand	WTA 250	Hard	(China) Jiang Xinyu	(Serbia) Aleksandra Krunić (United States) Sabrina Santamaria	6–3, 6–4
Win	3–2	Jan 2025	Hobart International, Australia	WTA 250	Hard	(China) Jiang Xinyu	(Romania) Monica Niculescu (Hungary) Fanny Stollár	6–1, 7–6^{(8–6)}
Loss	3–3	Feb 2025	Qatar Ladies Open	WTA 1000	Hard	(China) Jiang Xinyu	(Italy) Sara Errani (Italy) Jasmine Paolini	5–7, 6–7^{(10–12)}
Win	4–3	Sep 2026	Korea Open, Korea	WTA 250	Hard	(Chinese Taipei) Chan Hao-ching	(Chinese Taipei) Lee Ya-hsin (China) Ye Qiuyu	6–2, 6–3

== WTA Challenger finals ==
=== Doubles: 3 (2 titles, 1 runner-up) ===
Result	W–L	Date	Tournament	Surface	Partner	Opponents	Score
Win	1–0	Nov 2019	Taipei Challenger, Taiwan	Carpet (i)	(Chinese Taipei) Lee Ya-hsuan	(Slovenia) Dalila Jakupović (Montenegro) Danka Kovinić	4–6, 6–4, [10–7]
Win	2–0	Jun 2023	Makarska International, Croatia	Clay	(Estonia) Ingrid Neel	(Czech Republic) Anna Sisková (Czech Republic) Renata Voráčová	6–3, 7–5
Loss	2–1	Jul 2024	Contrexéville Open, France	Clay	(China) Zhang Shuai	(Georgia (country)) Oksana Kalashnikova; Iryna Shymanovich	7–5, 3–6, [7–10]

== ITF Circuit finals ==
=== Doubles: 41 (21 titles, 20 runner-ups) ===
Legend
$100,000 tournaments (0–2)
$80,000 tournaments (0–1)
$60,000 tournaments (2–3)
$25,000 tournaments (9–10)
$10/15,000 tournaments (10–4)

Result	W–L	Date	Tournament	Tier	Surface	Partner	Opponents	Score
Loss	0–1	Jun 2016	ITF Kaohsiung, Taiwan	10,000	Hard	(Chinese Taipei) Chen Pei-hsuan	(Japan) Erina Hayashi (Japan) Haruka Kaji	4–6, 6–3, [7–10]
Win	1–1	Jun 2017	ITF Hammamet, Tunisia	15,000	Clay	(Chinese Taipei) Hsieh Shu-ying	(Chile) Fernanda Brito (Bolivia) Noelia Zeballos	5–7, 6–3, [11–9]
Loss	1–2	Jul 2017	ITF Sharm El Sheikh, Egypt	15,000	Hard	(Chinese Taipei) Chen Pei-hsuan	(India) Rutuja Bhosale (Egypt) Mayar Sherif	6–3, 3–6, [5–10]
Win	2–2	Jul 2017	ITF Sharm El Sheikh, Egypt	15,000	Hard	(Chinese Taipei) Chen Pei-hsuan	(Romania) Ana Bianca Mihaila (China) Zhao Xiaoxi	6–2, 6–1
Win	3–2	Aug 2017	ITF Sharm El Sheikh, Egypt	15,000	Hard	(Chinese Taipei) Chen Pei-hsuan	(Romania) Ana Bianca Mihaila (China) Zhao Xiaoxi	6–4, 6–2
Win	4–2	Sep 2017	ITF Sharm El Sheikh, Egypt	15,000	Hard	(Chinese Taipei) Chen Pei-hsuan	(Chinese Taipei) Hsieh Yu-ting (Chinese Taipei) Lee Pei-chi	7–6, 3–6, [11–9]
Win	5–2	Sep 2017	ITF Sharm El Sheikh, Egypt	15,000	Hard	(Chinese Taipei) Chen Pei-hsuan	(Chinese Taipei) Lee Pei-chi (India) Kanika Vaidya	6–0, 1–6, [10–7]
Win	6–2	Dec 2017	ITF Hong Kong, China SAR	15,000	Hard	(Chinese Taipei) Chen Pei-hsuan	(Chinese Taipei) Chan Chin-wei (China) Lu Jiaxi	6–1, 6–0
Loss	6–3	Jan 2018	ITF Hong Kong	15,000	Hard	(Chinese Taipei) Chen Pei-hsuan	(United States) Yuki Kristina Chiang (Belgium) Helène Scholsen	2–6, 3–6
Loss	6–4	Apr 2018	ITF Sharm El Sheikh, Egypt	15,000	Hard	(Chinese Taipei) Chen Pei-hsuan	(Belarus) Iryna Shymanovich (Bulgaria) Julia Terziyska	6–4, 6–2
Loss	6–5	May 2018	ITF Rome, Italy	25,000	Clay	(Chinese Taipei) Chen Pei-hsuan	(Switzerland) Conny Perrin (South Africa) Chanel Simmonds	7–6^{(0)}, 1–6, [7–10]
Win	7–5	May 2018	ITF San Severo, Italy	15,000	Clay	(Chinese Taipei) Chen Pei-hsuan	(Belarus) Sviatlana Pirazhenka (Georgia (country)) Sofia Shapatava	6–3, 6–4
Win	8–5	May 2018	ITF Caserta, Italy	25,000	Clay	(Chinese Taipei) Chen Pei-hsuan	(Australia) Jaimee Fourlis (Australia) Ellen Perez	7–6^{(6)}, 6–3
Loss	8–6	Jun 2018	ITF Ystad, Sweden	25,000	Clay	(Chinese Taipei) Chen Pei-hsuan	(United Kingdom) Emily Arbuthnott (Denmark) Emilie Francati	2–6, 1–6
Win	9–6	Jun 2018	ITF Båstad, Sweden	25,000	Clay	(Chinese Taipei) Chen Pei-hsuan	(Kazakhstan) Anna Danilina (Switzerland) Karin Kennel	7–5, 1–6, [10–5]
Loss	9–7	Jul 2018	ITF Nonthaburi, Thailand	25,000	Hard	(Chinese Taipei) Chen Pei-hsuan	(India) Rutuja Bhosale (India) Pranjala Yadlapalli	5–7, 2–6
Loss	9–8	Aug 2018	Landisville Tennis Challenge, US	60,000	Hard (i)	(Chinese Taipei) Chen Pei-hsuan	(Australia) Ellen Perez (Australia) Arina Rodionova	0–6, 2–6
Loss	9–9	Jan 2019	ITF Hong Kong, China SAR	25,000	Hard	(Chinese Taipei) Chen Pei-hsuan	(Netherlands) Michaëlla Krajicek (Czech Republic) Barbora Štefková	4–6, 7–6^{(3)}, [10–12]
Win	10–9	Jan 2019	ITF Hong Kong	25,000	Hard	(Chinese Taipei) Chen Pei-hsuan	(Japan) Robu Kajitani (Japan) Hiroko Kuwata	6–3, 6–3
Loss	10–10	Jan 2019	ITF Singapore	25,000	Hard	(Chinese Taipei) Chen Pei-hsuan	(Netherlands) Quirine Lemoine (Netherlands) Arantxa Rus	2–6, 4–6
Loss	10–11	Feb 2019	Indoor Championships Kyoto, Japan	60,000	Hard (i)	(Chinese Taipei) Chen Pei-hsuan	(Japan) Eri Hozumi (Japan) Moyuka Uchijima	4–6, 3–6
Win	11–11	Sep 2019	ITF Kyoto, Japan	25,000	Hard	(Chinese Taipei) Lee Ya-hsuan	(Japan) Kanako Morisaki (Japan) Minori Yonehara	6–4, 3–6, [10–7]
Win	12–11	Dec 2019	ITF Navi Mumbai, India	25,000	Hard	(Chinese Taipei) Lee Pei-chi	(Russia) Olga Doroshina (Russia) Shalimar Talbi	6–2, 6–2
Win	13–11	Jan 2020	ITF Hong Kong, China SAR	W25	Hard	(Hong Kong) Eudice Chong	(Japan) Moyuka Uchijima (China) Zhang Ying	7–6^{(2)}, 6–1
Loss	13–12	Jun 2022	ITF Changwon, South Korea	W25	Hard	(Chinese Taipei) Lee Ya-hsuan	(South Korea) Choi Ji-hee (South Korea) Han Na-lae	3–6, 6–4, [13–15]
Loss	13–13	Jun 2022	ITF Incheon, South Korea	W25	Hard	(Chinese Taipei) Lee Ya-hsuan	(South Korea) Choi Ji-hee (South Korea) Han Na-lae	7–5, 4–6, [6–10]
Win	14–13	Jun 2022	ITF Ra'anana, Israel	W25	Hard	(Chinese Taipei) Lee Ya-hsuan	(Japan) Chihiro Muramatsu (Hungary) Rebeka Stolmár	6–3, 6–1
Win	15–13	Jul 2022	ITF Porto, Portugal	W25	Hard	(Chinese Taipei) Lee Ya-hsuan	(China) Lu Jiajing (Australia) Alana Parnaby	5–7, 6–4, [10–1]
Loss	15–14	Jul 2022	ITF Corroios-Seixal, Portugal	W25	Hard	(Chinese Taipei) Lee Ya-hsuan	(Lithuania) Justina Mikulskytė (Hong Kong) Cody Wong	2–6, 5–7
Loss	15–15	Jul 2022	ITF Figueira da Foz, Portugal	W25+H	Hard	(Chinese Taipei) Lee Pei-chi	(Australia) Alexandra Bozovic (Portugal) Francisca Jorge	2–6, 6–3, [10–12]
Win	16–15	Jul 2022	ITF Nottingham, United Kingdom	W25	Hard	(Chinese Taipei) Lee Pei-chi	(Netherlands) Jasmijn Gimbrère (Netherlands) Isabelle Haverlag	6–3, 6–2
Loss	16–16	Oct 2022	Trnava Indoor, Slovakia	W60	Hard (i)	(Chinese Taipei) Lee Pei-chi	(Russia) Sofya Lansere (Slovakia) Rebecca Šramková	6–4, 2–6, [9–11]
Loss	16–17	Oct 2022	ITF Loulé, Portugal	W25	Hard	(Chinese Taipei) Lee Pei-chi	(Portugal) Francisca Jorge (Portugal) Matilde Jorge	3–6, 5–7
Win	17–17	Nov 2022	Open Nantes Atlantique, France	W60	Hard (i)	(Belgium) Magali Kempen	(Slovenia) Veronika Erjavec (United Kingdom) Emily Webley-Smith	6–2, 6–4
Win	18–17	Nov 2022	ITF Monastir, Tunisia	W15	Hard	(Chinese Taipei) Tsao Chia-yi	(Latvia) Kamilla Bartone (Serbia) Bojana Marinković	6–0, 7–5
Win	19–17	Nov 2022	ITF Monastir, Tunisia	W15	Hard	(Chinese Taipei) Tsao Chia-yi	(Russia) Anastasiia Gureva (Russia) Vlada Mincheva	6–3, 6–4
Win	20–17	Dec 2022	ITF Monastir, Tunisia	W15	Hard	(Chinese Taipei) Tsao Chia-yi	(Romania) Oana Gavrilă (United Kingdom) Emilie Lindh	6–4, 6–3
Win	21–17	Dec 2022	Indoor Championships Kyoto, Japan	W60	Hard (i)	(Chinese Taipei) Liang En-shuo	(Japan) Momoko Kobori (Thailand) Luksika Kumkhum	2–6, 7–6^{(5)}, [10–2]
Loss	21–18	May 2023	Kangaroo Cup, Japan	W80	Hard	(Chinese Taipei) Lee Ya-hsuan	(South Korea) Han Na-lae (South Korea) Jang Su-jeong	6–7^{(3)}, 6–2, [8–10]
Loss	21–19	Nov 2023	Takasaki Open, Japan	W100	Hard	(Chinese Taipei) Liang En-shuo	(Thailand) Luksika Kumkhum (Thailand) Peangtarn Plipuech	3–6, 1–6
Loss	21–20	Apr 2024	Oeiras Open, Portugal	W100	Clay	(Russia) Yana Sizikova	(Portugal) Francisca Jorge (Portugal) Matilde Jorge	2–6, 0–6
