= Carpet court =

Type of tennis court

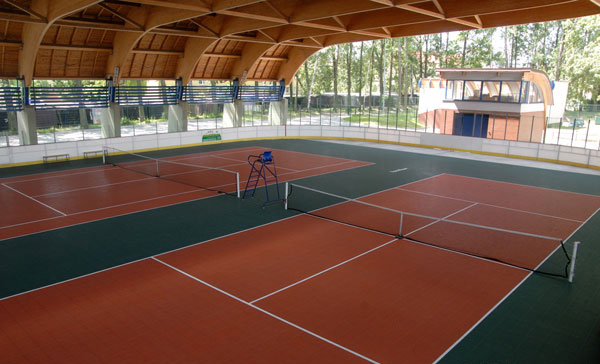
A carpet court in Kraków, Poland

A carpet court is a type of tennis court. The International Tennis Federation describes the surface as a "textile or polymeric material supplied in rolls or sheets of finished product". It is one of the fastest court types, second only to grass courts. The use of carpet courts in ATP Tour competitions ended in 2009. In women's tennis, no WTA Tour tournaments have used carpet courts since the last edition of the Tournoi de Québec in 2018.

== Types ==
There are two types of carpet court. The most common outdoor version consists of artificial turf with a sand in-fill. This type of carpet court became popular in the 1980s in British and Asian tennis clubs for recreational play as they were easier and cheaper to maintain than grass courts. The other type used predominantly for indoor tennis is a textile surface of nylon or rubber matting laid out on a concrete base.

Carpet courts have been used in venues which are not normally used for tennis or other sports, such as the Royal Albert Hall in London. Players usually approach such courts as they would a grass court due to both being similarly fast surfaces.

== Professional tournaments ==
The ATP Finals, WCT Finals, U.S. Pro Indoor, ECC Antwerp, Kremlin Cup, Paris Masters and Zagreb Indoors tournaments were all once played on carpet. In 2009, the governing body for men's professional tennis, the Association of Tennis Professionals (ATP), decided to end the use of carpet courts in top-tier tournaments. ATP spokesman Kris Dent said the most important reason for the change was to standardise indoor competitions to hard courts which he said will reduce the risk of injury. A number of players, including Mario Ančić and Jo-Wilfried Tsonga, criticised the move stating that professional tennis needed carpet courts for players to develop their ability for playing on fast courts. The last event played on carpet courts on the WTA Tour, the Tournoi de Québec, ended after the 2018 edition. The last carpet court tournament on the WTA 125K series was 2019 OEC Taipei WTA Challenger, while 2023 Wolffkran Open was the last carpet court tournament on the ATP Challenger Tour. The lowest rung of the professional tennis ladder, ITF World Tennis Tour still has several carpet court events.

== See also ==
- Clay court
- Hard court
- Wood court
