= Lee Ya-hsuan =

Taiwanese tennis player (born 1995)

Lee Ya-hsuan 李亞軒
- Country (sports): Chinese Taipei
- Born: 20 July 1995 (age 31) Taipei, Taiwan
- Plays: Right (two-handed backhand)
- Prize money: US$ 231,300

Singles
- Career record: 316–219
- Career titles: 12 ITF
- Highest ranking: No. 186 (11 April 2016)
- Current ranking: No. 872 (27 October 2025)

Doubles
- Career record: 166–112
- Career titles: 2 WTA Challengers, 10 ITF
- Highest ranking: No. 138 (6 February 2017)

Team competitions
- Fed Cup: 3–13
Medal record
Women's tennis
Representing Chinese Taipei
Asian Games
Silver medal – second place	2022 Hangzhou	Doubles
Summer Universiade
Gold medal – first place	2015 Gwangju	Team
Gold medal – first place	2017 Taipei	Team
Silver medal – second place	2015 Gwangju	Doubles
Silver medal – second place	2017 Taipei	Singles
Silver medal – second place	2019 Naples	Doubles
- Last updated on: 28 October 2024.

Lee Ya-hsuan
- Traditional Chinese: 李亞軒
- Simplified Chinese: 李亚轩
Transcriptions
Standard Mandarin
- Hanyu Pinyin: Lǐ Yàxuān

Lee Ya-hsuan (Chinese: 李亞軒; born 20 July 1995) is a Taiwanese former tennis player.

She has career-high WTA rankings of 186 in singles, achieved on 11 April 2016, and 138 in doubles, set on 6 February 2017.

Playing for the Chinese Taipei Billie Jean King Cup team, Lee has an overall win–loss record of 3–13.

== WTA Challenger finals ==
=== Doubles: 2 (2 titles) ===
Result	Date	Tournament	Surface	Partner	Opponents	Score
Win	Sep 2016	Dalian Open, China	Hard	(Japan) Kotomi Takahata	(Thailand) Nicha Lertpitaksinchai (Indonesia) Jessy Rompies	6–2, 6–1
Win	Nov 2019	Taipei Open, Taiwan	Carpet (i)	(Chinese Taipei) Wu Fang-hsien	(Slovenia) Dalila Jakupović (Montenegro) Danka Kovinić	4–6, 6–4, [10–7]

== ITF Circuit finals ==
=== Singles: 23 (12 titles, 11 runner-ups) ===
Legend W50 tournaments W25 tournaments W10/15 tournaments	Finals by surface Hard (11–9) Clay (0–1) Carpet (1–1)

Result	W–L	Date	Tournament	Tier	Surface	Opponent	Score
Loss	0–1	Jun 2011	ITF Taipei, Taiwan	10,000	Hard	(Chinese Taipei) Juan Ting-fei	4–6, 6–7^{(1)}
Loss	0–2	Aug 2011	ITF Taipei, Taiwan	10,000	Hard	(Chinese Taipei) Lee Hua-chen	2–6, 2–6
Win	1–2	Jan 2013	ITF Taipei, Taiwan	10,000	Hard	(Japan) Kanae Hisami	6–7^{(6)}, 6–2, 6–4
Win	2–2	Jun 2014	ITF Taipei, Taiwan	10,000	Hard	(Japan) Akiko Omae	6–3, 6–2
Loss	2–3	Sep 2014	ITF Noto, Japan	25,000	Carpet	(Thailand) Tamarine Tanasugarn	0–6, 4–6
Win	3–3	Jun 2015	ITF Kaohsiung, Taiwan	10,000	Hard	(Chinese Taipei) Hsu Ching-wen	6–4, 2–6, 6–3
Win	4–3	Aug 2015	ITF Tsukuba, Japan	25,000	Hard	(South Korea) Jang Su-jeong	6–3, 6–3
Win	5–3	Sep 2015	ITF Noto, Japan	25,000	Carpet	(Japan) Kyōka Okamura	6–3, 3–6, 7–6^{(10)}
Win	6–3	Jan 2017	ITF Hong Kong, China SAR	25,000	Hard	(United Kingdom) Tara Moore	2–6, 7–6^{(4)}, 6–3
Loss	6–4	Apr 2017	ITF Nanning, China	25,000	Hard	(Kazakhstan) Zarina Diyas	2–6, 3–6
Win	7–4	Jan 2018	ITF Hong Kong	15,000	Hard	(Japan) Hiroko Kuwata	6–4, 6–4
Win	8–4	May 2018	ITF Changwon, South Korea	25,000	Hard	(Russia) Varvara Flink	0–6, 6–3, 6–0
Loss	8–5	Jun 2018	ITF Sangju, South Korea	15,000	Hard (i)	(Hong Kong) Wu Ho-ching	5–7, 3–6
Win	9–5	Jul 2018	ITF Nonthaburi, Thailand	25,000	Hard	(China) Zhang Kailin	6–1, 6–3
Loss	9–6	May 2019	ITF Changwon, South Korea	25,000	Hard	(South Africa) Chanel Simmonds	3–6, 5–7
Win	10–6	Aug 2019	ITF Huangshan, China	25,000	Hard	(Slovakia) Zuzana Zlochová	6–3, 6–0
Win	11–6	Sep 2019	ITF Kyoto, Japan	25,000	Hard (i)	(Japan) Haruka Kaji	6–3, 6–4
Win	12–6	Apr 2021	ITF Sharm El Sheikh, Egypt	W15	Hard	(Australia) Olivia Gadecki	6–3, 6–3
Loss	12–7	Apr 2022	ITF Sharm El Sheikh, Egypt	W15	Hard	(Chinese Taipei) Lee Pei-chi	4–6, 7–6^{(6)}, 3–6
Loss	12–8	Apr 2023	ITF Fukui, Japan	W15	Hard	(Japan) Miho Kuramochi	5–7, 0–3 ret.
Loss	12–9	Jun 2023	ITF Tainan, Taiwan	W25	Clay	(Chinese Taipei) Yang Ya-yi	3–6, 1–6
Loss	12–10	Mar 2024	Kōfu International Open, Japan	W50	Hard	(United States) Catherine Harrison	7–6^{(8)}, 1–6, 1–6
Loss	12–11	Apr 2024	ITF Kashiwa, Japan	W50	Hard	(China) Wei Sijia	1–6, 5–7

=== Doubles: 25 (10 titles, 15 runner-ups) ===
Legend $80,000 tournaments $50,000 tournaments $25/35,000 tournaments $10/15,000 tournaments	Finals by surface Hard (9–14) Clay (1–1)

Result	W–L	Date	Tournament	Tier	Surface	Partner	Opponents	Score
Loss	0–1	Jun 2012	ITF Taipei, Taiwan	10,000	Hard (i)	(Chinese Taipei) Hsu Ching-wen	(Chinese Taipei) Kao Shao-yuan (Chinese Taipei) Lee Hua-chen	3–6, 3–6
Loss	0–2	May 2013	ITF Phuket, Thailand	25,000	Hard	(Oman) Fatma Al-Nabhani	(Thailand) Nicha Lertpitaksinchai (Thailand) Peangtarn Plipuech	2–6, 4–6
Loss	0–3	Sep 2013	ITF Tsukuba, Japan	25,000	Hard	(Japan) Yumi Miyazaki	(Chinese Taipei) Hsu Wen-hsin (Chinese Taipei) Chan Chin-wei	2–6, 1–6
Loss	0–4	Dec 2013	ITF Hong Kong	10,000	Hard	(Chinese Taipei) Chuang Chia-jung	(Australia) Ellen Perez (Australia) Abbie Myers	6–4, 3–6, [8–10]
Loss	0–5	Jul 2014	ITF Phuket, Thailand	25,000	Hard (i)	(Japan) Akari Inoue	(South Korea) Han Na-lae (South Korea) Yoo Mi	4–6, 3–6
Win	1–5	Feb 2015	ITF Aurangabad, India	25,000	Clay	(Thailand) Varatchaya Wongteanchai	(Chinese Taipei) Hsu Ching-wen (Chinese Taipei) Lee Pei-chi	6–1, 7–6^{(4)}
Win	2–5	May 2015	ITF Seoul, South Korea	50,000	Hard	(Chinese Taipei) Chan Chin-wei	(South Korea) Hong Seung-yeon (South Korea) Kang Seo-kyung	6–2, 6–1
Loss	2–6	Jun 2015	ITF Kaohsiung, Taiwan	10,000	Hard	(Chinese Taipei) Pai Ya-yun	(Chinese Taipei) Lee Pei-chi (Japan) Hirono Watanabe	3–6, 5–7
Win	3–6	Aug 2015	ITF Tsukuba, Japan	25,000	Hard	(Japan) Makoto Ninomiya	(Thailand) Nicha Lertpitaksinchai (Thailand) Peangtarn Plipuech	6–7^{(4)}, 7–6^{(2)}, [10–6]
Win	4–6	Feb 2016	Delhi Open, India	25,000	Hard	(Chinese Taipei) Hsu Ching-wen	(Russia) Natela Dzalamidze (Russia) Veronika Kudermetova	6–0, 0–6, [10–6]
Win	5–6	Feb 2016	ITF Port Pirie, Australia	25,000	Hard	(Japan) Riko Sawayanagi	(Australia) Ashleigh Barty (Australia) Casey Dellacqua	6–4, 7–5
Win	6–6	Apr 2017	ITF Kashiwa, Japan	25,000	Hard	(South Korea) Jang Su-jeong	(South Korea) Han Na-lae (Thailand) Peangtarn Plipuech	6–3, 3–6, [10–4]
Loss	6–7	Apr 2019	ITF Kashiwa, Japan	25,000	Hard	(South Korea) Lee So-ra	(Japan) Kanako Morisaki (Japan) Minori Yonehara	6–4, 2–6, [5–10]
Loss	6–8	May 2019	ITF Changwon, South Korea	25,000	Hard	(South Korea) Choi Ji-hee	(Chinese Taipei) Hsu Chieh-yu (South Africa) Chanel Simmonds	3–6, 4–6
Win	7–8	Sep 2019	ITF Kyoto, Japan	25,000	Hard (i)	(Chinese Taipei) Wu Fang-hsien	(Japan) Kanako Morisaki (Japan) Minori Yonehara	3–6, 6–4, [10–8]
Win	8–8	Aug 2021	ITF Ourense, Spain	W25	Hard	(Russia) Ekaterina Yashina	(Spain) Alba Carrillo Marín (Lithuania) Justina Mikulskytė	6–2, 6–3
Loss	8–9	Jun 2022	ITF Changwon, South Korea	W25	Hard	(Chinese Taipei) Wu Fang-hsien	(South Korea) Choi Ji-hee (South Korea) Han Na-lae	3–6, 6–4, [13–15]
Win	9–9	Jun 2022	ITF Ra'anana, Israel	W25	Hard	(Chinese Taipei) Wu Fang-hsien	(Japan) Chihiro Muramatsu (Hungary) Rebeka Stolmár	6–3, 6–1
Win	10–9	Jul 2022	ITF Porto, Portugal	W25	Hard	(Chinese Taipei) Wu Fang-hsien	(China) Lu Jiajing (Australia) Alana Parnaby	5–7, 6–4, [10–1]
Loss	10–10	Jul 2022	ITF Corroios-Seixal, Portugal	W25	Hard	(Chinese Taipei) Wu Fang-hsien	(Lithuania) Justina Mikulskytė (Hong Kong) Cody Wong	2–6, 5–7
Loss	10–11	Apr 2023	ITF Osaka, Japan	W25	Hard	(Chinese Taipei) Lee Pei-chi	(Australia) Alexandra Bosovic (Australia) Petra Hule	2–6, 3–6
Loss	10–12	Apr 2023	ITF Osaka, Japan	W15	Hard	(South Korea) Choi Ji-hee	(Japan) Aoi Ito (Japan) Mio Mushika	4–6, 7–6^{(5)}, [6–10]
Loss	10–13	May 2023	Kangaroo Cup, Japan	W80	Hard	(Chinese Taipei) Wu Fang-hsien	(South Korea) Han Na-lae (South Korea) Jang Su-jeong	6–7^{(3)}, 6–2, [8–10]
Loss	10–14	Jun 2023	ITF Tainan, Taiwan	W25	Clay	(Chinese Taipei) Lee Ya-hsin	(Belgium) Sofia Costoulas (Chinese Taipei) Li Yu-yun	4–6, 4–6
Loss	10–15	Mar 2024	ITF Indore, India	W35	Hard	(South Korea) Park So-hyun	(India) Shrivalli Bhamidipati (India) Vaidehi Chaudhari	3–6, 5–7
