= 2018 Oracle Challenger Series – Houston =

Tennis tournament

- Date: November 12–18
- Edition: 1st
- Category: ATP Challenger Tour; WTA 125K series
- Draw: 32S / 16D
- Prize money: $150,000+H (ATP) $150,000 (WTA)
- Surface: Hard, outdoor
- Location: Houston, United States
- Venue: George R. Brown Tennis Center

Champions

Men's singles
- (United States) Bradley Klahn

Women's singles
- (China) Peng Shuai

Men's doubles
- (United States) Austin Krajicek / (United States) Nicholas Monroe

Women's doubles
- (United States) Maegan Manasse / (United States) Jessica Pegula
Oracle Challenger Series – Houston	· 2019 →

The 2018 Oracle Challenger Series – Houston was a professional tennis tournament played on outdoor hard courts. This tournament was part of the 2018 ATP Challenger Tour and the 2018 WTA 125K series. The first edition took place at the George R. Brown Tennis Center from November 12 to 18, 2018 in Houston, United States.

== Men's singles main-draw entrants ==
=== Seeds ===
Country	Player	Rank^{1}	Seed
USA	Tennys Sandgren	61	1
USA	Bradley Klahn	95	2
CRO	Ivo Karlović	102	3
ITA	Paolo Lorenzi	115	4
TPE	Jason Jung	128	5
USA	Bjorn Fratangelo	131	6
USA	Tim Smyczek	140	7
GER	Dominik Köpfer	177	8

- ^{1} Rankings are as of 5 November 2018.

=== Other entrants ===
The following players received wildcards into the singles main draw:

- (United States) Tom Fawcett
- (United States) Sumit Sarkar
- (United States) Ronnie Schneider
- (United States) Roy Smith

The following players received entry from the qualifying draw:

- (United States) Harrison Adams
- (Canada) Alexis Galarneau
- (Germany) Julian Lenz
- (United States) Michael Redlicki

== Women's singles main-draw entrants ==
=== Seeds ===
Country	Player	Rank^{1}	Seed
SUI	Belinda Bencic	37	1
~~ROU~~	~~Monica Niculescu~~	~~78~~	~~2~~
GBR	Heather Watson	101	3
USA	Jessica Pegula	125	4
HUN	Fanny Stollár	127	5
USA	Varvara Lepchenko	129	6
RUS	Sofya Zhuk	133	7
CZE	Marie Bouzková	142	8
USA	Nicole Gibbs	147	9

- ^{1} Rankings are as of 5 November 2018.

=== Other entrants ===
The following players received wildcards into the singles main draw:

- (Switzerland) Belinda Bencic
- ~~(United States) Kayla Day~~
- (Australia) Michaela Haet
- (China) Peng Shuai
- (Italy) Bianca Turati

The following players received entry from the qualifying draw:

- (United States) Lauren Davis
- (United States) Elizabeth Halbauer
- (Hungary) Dalma Gálfi
- (Slovakia) Kristína Kučová
- (United States) Ann Li
- (United States) Whitney Osuigwe

The following players received entry into the main draw as lucky losers:

- (United States) Jacqueline Cako
- (United States) Louisa Chirico
- (Hungary) Réka Luca Jani
- (Canada) Katherine Sebov

=== Withdrawals ===
- (United States) Kristie Ahn → replaced by (Brazil) Beatriz Haddad Maia
- (Canada) Eugenie Bouchard → replaced by (United States) Jacqueline Cako
- (Paraguay) Verónica Cepede Royg → replaced by (Israel) Deniz Khazaniuk
- (United States) Kayla Day → replaced by (Hungary) Réka Luca Jani
- (Israel) Julia Glushko → replaced by (United Kingdom) Naomi Broady
- (United States) Claire Liu → replaced by (United States) Louisa Chirico
- (United States) Christina McHale → replaced by (Italy) Deborah Chiesa
- (Romania) Monica Niculescu → replaced by (Canada) Katherine Sebov

=== Retirements ===
- (Hungary) Dalma Gálfi (back injury)

== Women's doubles main-draw entrants ==
=== Seeds ===
Country	Player	Country	Player	Rank^{1}	Seed
GBR	Naomi Broady	USA	Sabrina Santamaria	143	1
USA	Asia Muhammad	USA	Maria Sanchez	151	2
USA	Desirae Krawczyk	MEX	Giuliana Olmos	152	3
CHI	Alexa Guarachi	NZL	Erin Routliffe	184	4

- Rankings are as of 5 November 2018

=== Other entrants ===
The following pair received a wildcard into the doubles main draw:

- (Republic of Ireland) Anna Bowtell / (Belgium) Victoria Smirnova

== Champions ==
=== Men's singles ===
- (United States) Bradley Klahn def. (United States) Roy Smith 7–6^{(7–4)}, 7–6^{(7–4)}.

=== Women's singles ===
- (China) Peng Shuai def. (United States) Lauren Davis 1–6, 7–5, 6–4

=== Men's doubles ===
- (United States) Austin Krajicek / (United States) Nicholas Monroe def. (El Salvador) Marcelo Arévalo / (United States) James Cerretani 4–6, 7–6^{(7–3)}, [10–5].

=== Women's doubles ===
- (United States) Maegan Manasse / (United States) Jessica Pegula def. (United States) Desirae Krawczyk / (Mexico) Giuliana Olmos, 1–6, 6–4, [10–8]
