= 2018 Oracle Challenger Series – Houston – Men's singles =

Houston – Men's singles
- 2018 Oracle Challenger Series – Houston

Final
- Champion: (United States) Bradley Klahn
- Runner-up: (United States) Roy Smith
- Score: 7–6^{(7–4)}, 7–6^{(7–4)}

Events
Singles	men	women
Doubles	men	women
Oracle Challenger Series – Houston	· 2019 →

This was the first edition of the tournament.

Bradley Klahn won the title after defeating Roy Smith 7–6^{(7–4)}, 7–6^{(7–4)} in the final.

== Seeds ==
1. (United States) Tennys Sandgren (first round)
2. (United States) Bradley Klahn (champion)
3. (Croatia) Ivo Karlović (quarterfinals)
4. (Italy) Paolo Lorenzi (second round)
5. (Chinese Taipei) Jason Jung (quarterfinals)
6. (United States) Bjorn Fratangelo (first round, retired)
7. (United States) Tim Smyczek (first round)
8. (Germany) Dominik Köpfer (semifinals)

== Draw ==
=== Key ===
- Q = Qualifier
- WC = Wild card
- LL = Lucky loser
- Alt = Alternate
- SE = Special exempt
- PR = Protected ranking
- ITF = ITF entry
- JE = Junior exempt
- w/o = Walkover
- r = Retired
- d = Defaulted
- SR = Special ranking

=== Finals ===
Semifinals
(Poland) Kamil Majchrzak	4	3^{r}
WC	(United States) Roy Smith	6	2
8	(Germany) Dominik Köpfer	3	4
2	(United States) Bradley Klahn	6	6

Final
WC	(United States) Roy Smith	6^{4}	6^{4}
2	(United States) Bradley Klahn	7^{7}	7^{7}

=== Top half ===
First round
1	(United States) T Sandgren	2	5
(Poland) K Majchrzak	6	7
WC	(United States) Sumit Sarkar	6^{1}	1
(Spain) R Ortega Olmedo	7^{7}	6
(France) E Couacaud	6	6
WC	(United States) R Schneider	4	3
(Dominican Republic) R Cid Subervi	1	1
5	(Chinese Taipei) J Jung	6	6
4	(Italy) P Lorenzi	6	3	6
(United States) S Kozlov	4	6	4
(United States) T-S Kwiatkowski	7^{8}	4	6
(United States) M Krueger	6^{6}	6	4
(Barbados) D King	3	6	6^{4}
WC	(United States) Roy Smith	6	3	7^{7}
Q	(United States) Harrison Adams	6	7
7	(United States) T Smyczek	3	5

Second round
(Poland) K Majchrzak	6	4	6
(Spain) R Ortega Olmedo	3	6	3
(France) E Couacaud	1	6^{3}
5	(Chinese Taipei) J Jung	6	7^{7}
4	(Italy) P Lorenzi	4	4
(United States) T-S Kwiatkowski	6	6
WC	(United States) R Smith	6	6
Q	(United States) H Adams	3	4

Quarterfinals
(Poland) K Majchrzak	7^{7}	6^{2}	6
5	(Chinese Taipei) J Jung	6^{5}	7^{7}	3
(United States) T-S Kwiatkowski	6	6^{5}	6^{1}
WC	(United States) R Smith	4	7^{7}	7^{7}

Semifinals
(Poland) K Majchrzak	4	3^{r}
WC	(United States) R Smith	6	2

=== Bottom half ===
First round
8	(Germany) D Köpfer	7^{7}	3	6
(El Salvador) M Arévalo	6^{4}	6	4
Q	(Germany) J Lenz	6	3	6^{6}
(United States) E Escobedo	4	6	7^{8}
(Ecuador) E Gómez	6	6
(Colombia) DE Galán	1	4
(United States) M Giron	4	2
3	(Croatia) I Karlović	6	6
6	(United States) B Fratangelo	3	0^{r}
(United States) Evan Song	6	0
Q	(Canada) A Galarneau	6	6
WC	(United States) T Fawcett	3	2
Q	(United States) Mi Redlicki	6	1	6
(Dominican Republic) J Hernández-Fernández	4	6	4
(United States) A Sarkissian	1	2
2	(United States) B Klahn	6	6

Second round
8	(Germany) D Köpfer	6	7
(United States) E Escobedo	1	5
(Ecuador) E Gómez	6^{1}	3
3	(Croatia) I Karlović	7^{7}	6
(United States) E Song	6	3	6
Q	(Canada) A Galarneau	2	6	2
Q	(United States) Mi Redlicki	4	4
2	(United States) B Klahn	6	6

Quarterfinals
8	(Germany) D Köpfer	6	6
3	(Croatia) I Karlović	1	4
(United States) E Song	3	6	1
2	(United States) B Klahn	6	4	6

Semifinals
8	(Germany) D Köpfer	3	4
2	(United States) B Klahn	6	6
