= 2019 Oracle Challenger Series – Houston – Women's doubles =

Houston – Women's doubles
- 2019 Oracle Challenger Series – Houston

Final
- Champions: (Australia) Ellen Perez (Brazil) Luisa Stefani
- Runners-up: (Canada) Sharon Fichman (Japan) Ena Shibahara
- Score: 1–6, 6–4, [10–5]

Events
Singles	men	women
Doubles	men	women
← 2018 ·	Oracle Challenger Series – Houston	· 2020 →

Maegan Manasse and Jessica Pegula were the defending champions, but chose not to participate.

Ellen Perez and Luisa Stefani won the title, defeating Sharon Fichman and Ena Shibahara in the final, 1–6, 6–4, [10–5].

== Seeds ==
1. (Canada) Sharon Fichman / (Japan) Ena Shibahara (final)
2. (Australia) Ellen Perez / (Brazil) Luisa Stefani (champions)
3. (Mexico) Giuliana Olmos / (United States) Sabrina Santamaria (first round)
4. (Hungary) Fanny Stollár / (United States) Taylor Townsend (quarterfinals, withdrew)

== Draw ==
=== Key ===
- Q = Qualifier
- WC = Wild card
- LL = Lucky loser
- Alt = Alternate
- SE = Special exempt
- PR = Protected ranking
- ITF = ITF entry
- JE = Junior exempt
- w/o = Walkover
- r = Retired
- d = Defaulted
- SR = Special ranking

=== Draw ===
First round
1	(Canada) S Fichman (Japan) E Shibahara	6	6
(Hungary) D Gálfi (Greece) V Grammatikopoulou	0	2
(United States) I Falconi (United States) C McNally	3	6	[10]
(Montenegro) V Babić (United States) C Whoriskey	6	3	[4]
3	(Mexico) G Olmos (United States) S Santamaria	6	3	[8]
(United States) H Carter (United States) J Loeb	4	6	[10]
(United States) J Cako (Serbia) O Danilović	6	6
(Brazil) G Cé (France) J Ponchet	3	3
(United States) Q Gleason (United States) C Harrison	4	6	[5]
(Indonesia) B Gumulya (Indonesia) J Rompies	6	2	[10]
(Belarus) O Govortsova (Luxembourg) M Minella	4	4
4	(Hungary) F Stollár (United States) T Townsend	6	6
WC	(United States) H Baptiste (United States) E Douglas	4	2
(United States) UM Arconada (United States) C Dolehide	6	6
(Kazakhstan) A Danilina (United States) I Neel	2	6	[8]
2	(Australia) E Perez (Brazil) L Stefani	6	0	[10]

Quarterfinals
1	(Canada) S Fichman (Japan) E Shibahara	6	6
(United States) I Falconi (United States) C McNally	4	3
(United States) H Carter (United States) J Loeb	7	6
(United States) J Cako (Serbia) O Danilović	5	4
(Indonesia) B Gumulya (Indonesia) J Rompies	w/o
4	(Hungary) F Stollár (United States) T Townsend
(United States) UM Arconada (United States) C Dolehide	5	4
2	(Australia) E Perez (Brazil) L Stefani	7	6

Semifinals
1	(Canada) S Fichman (Japan) E Shibahara	6	6
(United States) H Carter (United States) J Loeb	3	4
(Indonesia) B Gumulya (Indonesia) J Rompies	1	4
2	(Australia) E Perez (Brazil) L Stefani	6	6

Final
1	(Canada) S Fichman (Japan) E Shibahara	6	4	[5]
2	(Australia) E Perez (Brazil) L Stefani	1	6	[10]
