= 2019 Oracle Challenger Series – Houston – Men's singles =

Houston – Men's singles
- 2019 Oracle Challenger Series – Houston

Final
- Champion: (United States) Marcos Giron
- Runner-up: (Croatia) Ivo Karlović
- Score: 7–5, 6–7^{(5–7)}, 7–6^{(11–9)}

Events
Singles	men	women
Doubles	men	women
- Oracle Challenger Series – Houston

Bradley Klahn was the defending champion but lost in the third round to Michael Mmoh.

Marcos Giron won the title after defeating Ivo Karlović 7–5, 6–7^{(5–7)}, 7–6^{(11–9)} in the final.

== Seeds ==
All seeds receive a bye into the second round.

1. (United States) Tennys Sandgren (third round)
2. (United States) Bradley Klahn (third round)
3. (Croatia) Ivo Karlović (final)
4. (United States) Marcos Giron (champion)
5. (Chinese Taipei) Jason Jung (quarterfinals)
6. (Australia) Christopher O'Connell (semifinals)
7. (Barbados) Darian King (second round)
8. (United States) Mitchell Krueger (semifinals)
9. (Russia) Alexey Vatutin (third round)
10. (United States) Donald Young (second round)
11. (Spain) Adrián Menéndez Maceiras (third round)
12. (Serbia) Peđa Krstin (third round)
13. (United States) Jenson Brooksby (third round)
14. (United States) Michael Mmoh (quarterfinals, retired)
15. (United States) Michael Redlicki (quarterfinals)
16. (United States) Sekou Bangoura (third round)

== Draw ==
Key

- Q = Qualifier
- WC = Wild card
- LL = Lucky loser
- Alt = Alternate
- ITF = ITF entry
- PR = Protected ranking
- SR = Special ranking
- SE = Special exempt
- JE = Junior exempt
- JR = Junior Accelerator Programme entrant
- CO = College Accelerator Programme entrant
- NG = Next Gen Accelerator Program entrant
- w/o = Walkover
- r = Retired
- d = Defaulted

=== Finals ===
Quarterfinals
15	(United States) Michael Redlicki	4	4
8	(United States) Mitchell Krueger	6	6
4	(United States) Marcos Giron	6	2	6
5	(Chinese Taipei) Jason Jung	1	6	2
Q	(Canada) Alexis Galarneau	6^{3}	6^{7}
3	(Croatia) Ivo Karlović	7^{7}	7^{9}
6	(Australia) Christopher O'Connell	5
14	(United States) Michael Mmoh	0^{r}

Semifinals
8	(United States) Mitchell Krueger	6^{4}	2
4	(United States) Marcos Giron	7^{7}	6
3	(Croatia) Ivo Karlović	6^{5}	6	6
6	(Australia) Christopher O'Connell	7^{7}	3	4

Final
4	(United States) Marcos Giron	7	6^{5}	7^{11}
3	(Croatia) Ivo Karlović	5	7^{7}	6^{9}

=== Top half ===
==== Section 1 ====
First round
(Israel) E Leshem	6	6
(Belgium) Christopher Heyman	4	4
(United States) G Nanda	6	6
WC	(United States) O Crawford	4	3
(United States) N Chappell	6	3	7^{7}
(Germany) S Fanselow	1	6	6^{5}
WC	(United States) Z Khan	4	3
(Brazil) F Meligeni Alves	6	6

Second round
1	(United States) T Sandgren	6	7
(Israel) E Leshem	3	5
(United States) G Nanda	3	3
15	(United States) Mi Redlicki	6	6
12	(Serbia) P Krstin	6	1	6
(United States) N Chappell	1	6	1
(Brazil) F Meligeni Alves	2	2
8	(United States) M Krueger	6	6

Third round
1	(United States) T Sandgren	7^{7}	4	4
15	(United States) Mi Redlicki	6^{5}	6	6
12	(Serbia) P Krstin	6^{4}	4
8	(United States) M Krueger	7^{7}	6

Quarterfinals
15	(United States) Mi Redlicki	4	4
8	(United States) M Krueger	6	6

==== Section 2 ====
First round
WC	(United States) B Holt	6	7
(Northern Mariana Islands) C Sinclair	1	5
(Brazil) R Matos	6^{3}	4
(Argentina) G Villanueva	7^{7}	6
(United States) A Sarkissian	1	1
(Ecuador) D Hidalgo	6	6
WC	(United States) Sumit Sarkar	1	0
(United States) D Nguyen	6	6

Second round
4	(United States) M Giron	7^{7}	6^{7}	6
WC	(United States) B Holt	6^{4}	7^{9}	2
(Argentina) G Villanueva	2	2
13	(United States) J Brooksby	6	6
9	(Russia) A Vatutin	1	7	6
(Ecuador) D Hidalgo	6	5	3
(United States) D Nguyen	3	2
5	(Chinese Taipei) J Jung	6	6

Third round
4	(United States) M Giron	6	4	6
13	(United States) J Brooksby	2	6	3
9	(Russia) A Vatutin	5	2
5	(Chinese Taipei) J Jung	7	6

Quarterfinals
4	(United States) M Giron	6	2	6
5	(Chinese Taipei) J Jung	1	6	2

=== Bottom half ===
==== Section 3 ====
First round
(Ecuador) G Escobar	6	7^{7}
(United States) E Zhu	2	6^{4}
Q	(Canada) A Galarneau	6	6
(Mexico) G López Villaseñor	3	3
(United States) A Ritschard	3	5
(Germany) Peter Heller	6	7
(Italy) L Caruana	6	6
WC	(Egypt) Mohamed Abdel-Aziz	2	4

Second round
7	(Barbados) D King	6^{3}	5
(Ecuador) G Escobar	7^{7}	7
Q	(Canada) A Galarneau	3	6	6
10	(United States) D Young	6	3	0
16	(United States) S Bangoura	0	6	6
(Germany) P Heller	6	4	2
(Italy) L Caruana	5	4
3	(Croatia) I Karlović	7	6

Third round
(Ecuador) G Escobar	3	3
Q	(Canada) A Galarneau	6	6
16	(United States) S Bangoura	6^{5}	6	4
3	(Croatia) I Karlović	7^{7}	2	6

Quarterfinals
Q	(Canada) A Galarneau	6^{3}	6^{7}
3	(Croatia) I Karlović	7^{7}	7^{9}

==== Section 4 ====
First round
(Argentina) MF Descotte	4	3
(Italy) A Vavassori	6	6
(United States) Gage Brymer	2	6^{5}
(United States) C Altamirano	6	7^{7}
(United States) E King	6	4	5
(United States) R Sarmiento	4	6	7
(Romania) FC Jianu	6	6
Q	(United States) A Ayeni	4	2

Second round
6	(Australia) C O'Connell	6	5	6
(Italy) A Vavassori	3	7	4
(United States) C Altamirano	4	0
11	(Spain) A Menéndez Maceiras	6	6
14	(United States) M Mmoh	4	6	6
(United States) R Sarmiento	6	4	4
(Romania) FC Jianu	5	3
2	(United States) B Klahn	7	6

Third round
6	(Australia) C O'Connell	7^{7}	6
11	(Spain) A Menéndez Maceiras	6^{3}	4
14	(United States) M Mmoh	5	7^{7}	7^{7}
2	(United States) B Klahn	7	6^{5}	6^{5}

Quarterfinals
6	(Australia) C O'Connell	5
14	(United States) M Mmoh	0^{r}
