= 2019 Ladies Open Lausanne – Doubles =

Doubles
- 2019 Ladies Open Lausanne

Final
- Champions: (Russia) Anastasia Potapova (Russia) Yana Sizikova
- Runners-up: (Australia) Monique Adamczak (China) Han Xinyun
- Score: 6–2, 6–4

Events
Singles	Doubles
← 2018 ·	WTA Swiss Open	· 2021 →

Alexa Guarachi and Desirae Krawczyk were the defending champions, but Krawczyk chose not to participate. Guarachi played alongside Erin Routliffe, but lost in the first round to Cornelia Lister and Renata Voráčová.

Anastasia Potapova and Yana Sizikova won the title, defeating Monique Adamczak and Han Xinyun in the final, 6–2, 6–4.

== Seeds ==
1. (Australia) Monique Adamczak / (China) Han Xinyun (final)
2. (Switzerland) Timea Bacsinszky / (Romania) Mihaela Buzărnescu (first round)
3. (Germany) Mona Barthel / (Switzerland) Xenia Knoll (quarterfinals)
4. (Georgia (country)) Oksana Kalashnikova / (Japan) Ena Shibahara (semifinals)

== Draw ==
=== Key ===
- Q = Qualifier
- WC = Wild card
- LL = Lucky loser
- Alt = Alternate
- SE = Special exempt
- PR = Protected ranking
- ITF = ITF entry
- JE = Junior exempt
- w/o = Walkover
- r = Retired
- d = Defaulted
- SR = Special ranking

=== Draw ===
First round
1	(Australia) M Adamczak (China) X Han	6	6
(Indonesia) B Gumulya (Indonesia) J Rompies	4	0
3	(Germany) M Barthel (Switzerland) X Knoll	6	6
WC	(Switzerland) T Sugnaux (Switzerland) S Waltert	4	4
(Sweden) C Lister (Czech Republic) R Voráčová	7^{7}	6
(Chile) A Guarachi (New Zealand) E Routliffe	6^{5}	4
(France) E Lechemia (Netherlands) E Wacanno	5	7	[11]
(United States) B Pera (Switzerland) J Teichmann	7	5	[9]
(India) A Raina (Netherlands) R van der Hoek	6	4	[6]
4	(Georgia (country)) O Kalashnikova (Japan) E Shibahara	3	6	[10]
(Russia) N Dzalamidze (Poland) P Kania	3	2
(Russia) A Potapova (Russia) Y Sizikova	6	6
WC	(Switzerland) Y In-Albon (Switzerland) C Perrin	7^{7}	6
2	(Switzerland) T Bacsinszky (Romania) M Buzărnescu	6^{5}	2

Quarterfinals
1	(Australia) M Adamczak (China) X Han	6	7
(Australia) A Bai (Germany) N Geuer	4	5
3	(Germany) M Barthel (Switzerland) X Knoll	4	4
(Sweden) C Lister (Czech Republic) R Voráčová	6	6
(France) E Lechemia (Netherlands) E Wacanno	3	3
4	(Georgia (country)) O Kalashnikova (Japan) E Shibahara	6	6
(Russia) A Potapova (Russia) Y Sizikova	1	7	[10]
WC	(Switzerland) Y In-Albon (Switzerland) C Perrin	6	5	[7]

Semifinals
1	(Australia) M Adamczak (China) X Han	7	4	[10]
(Sweden) C Lister (Czech Republic) R Voráčová	5	6	[7]
4	(Georgia (country)) O Kalashnikova (Japan) E Shibahara	6^{8}	3
(Russia) A Potapova (Russia) Y Sizikova	7^{10}	6

Final
1	(Australia) M Adamczak (China) X Han	2	4
(Russia) A Potapova (Russia) Y Sizikova	6	6
