= 2018 Ladies Championship Gstaad =

- Date: 16–22 July
- Edition: 26th
- Category: WTA International
- Draw: 32S / 16D
- Prize money: $250,000
- Surface: Clay / outdoor
- Location: Gstaad, Switzerland
- Venue: Roy Emerson Arena

Champions

Singles
- (France) Alizé Cornet

Doubles
- (Chile) Alexa Guarachi / (United States) Desirae Krawczyk
← 2017 ·	WTA Swiss Open	· 2019 →

The 2018 Ladies Championship Gstaad was a women's tennis tournament played on outdoor clay courts. It was the 26th edition of the Ladies Championship Gstaad, and part of the International category of the 2018 WTA Tour. It took place at Roy Emerson Arena in Gstaad, Switzerland, from 16 July through 22 July 2018.

== Points and prize money ==
=== Point distribution ===
Event	W	F	SF	QF	Round of 16	Round of 32	Q	Q2	Q1
Singles	280	180	110	60	30	1	18	12	1
Doubles	280	180	110	60	1	—	—	—	—

=== Prize money ===
Event	W	F	SF	QF	Round of 16	Round of 32	Q2	Q1
Singles	$43,000	$21,400	$11,500	$6,175	$3,400	$2,100	$1,020	$600
Doubles	$12,300	$6,400	$3,435	$1,820	$960	—	—	—

== Singles main draw entrants ==
=== Seeds ===
Country	Player	Rank^{1}	Seed
FRA	Alizé Cornet	44	1
SWE	Johanna Larsson	58	2
SVK	Viktória Kužmová	69	3
GER	Carina Witthöft	81	4
AUS	Samantha Stosur	86	5
ESP	Lara Arruabarrena	88	6
SUI	Stefanie Vögele	93	7
SUI	Viktorija Golubic	99	8

- ^{1} Rankings are as of 2 July 2018.

=== Other entrants ===
The following players received wildcards into the main draw:

- (Switzerland) Leonie Küng
- (Italy) Francesca Schiavone
- (Switzerland) Patty Schnyder

The following players received entry using a protected ranking into the main draw:

- (Luxembourg) Mandy Minella
- (China) Zheng Saisai

The following players received entry from the qualifying draw:

- (Russia) Valentyna Ivakhnenko
- (Russia) Veronika Kudermetova
- (Switzerland) Conny Perrin
- (Spain) Sílvia Soler Espinosa
- (Italy) Martina Trevisan
- (Liechtenstein) Kathinka von Deichmann

=== Withdrawals ===
- (Netherlands) Kiki Bertens → replaced by (Switzerland) Jil Teichmann
- (United States) Jennifer Brady → replaced by (Germany) Antonia Lottner
- (United States) Danielle Collins → replaced by (Germany) Tamara Korpatsch
- (Brazil) Beatriz Haddad Maia → replaced by (Czech Republic) Tereza Martincová
- (Belgium) Alison Van Uytvanck → replaced by (Russia) Anna Kalinskaya

== Doubles main draw entrants ==
=== Seeds ===
Country	Player	Country	Player	Rank^{1}	Seed
SUI	Xenia Knoll	RUS	Veronika Kudermetova	130	1
USA	Kaitlyn Christian	MEX	Giuliana Olmos	151	2
CAN	Eugenie Bouchard	SWE	Johanna Larsson	154	3
NED	Bibiane Schoofs	RUS	Yana Sizikova	190	4

- ^{1} Rankings are as of 2 July 2018.

=== Other entrants ===
The following pairs received wildcards into the doubles main draw:

- (France) Amandine Hesse / (Switzerland) Leonie Küng
- (Switzerland) Conny Perrin / (Poland) Katarzyna Piter

The following pair received entry as alternates:

- (Germany) Tamara Korpatsch / (Latvia) Diāna Marcinkēviča

=== Withdrawals ===
Before the tournament

- (Russia) Anna Kalinskaya
- (Russia) Natalia Vikhlyantseva

== Finals ==
=== Singles ===
- (France) Alizé Cornet defeated (Luxembourg) Mandy Minella, 6–4, 7–6^{(8–6)}

=== Doubles ===
- (Chile) Alexa Guarachi / (United States) Desirae Krawczyk defeated (Spain) Lara Arruabarrena / (Switzerland) Timea Bacsinszky, 4–6, 6–4, [10–6]
