= 2019 Oracle Challenger Series – Houston – Men's doubles =

Houston – Men's doubles
- 2019 Oracle Challenger Series – Houston

Final
- Champions: (Israel) Jonathan Erlich (Mexico) Santiago González
- Runners-up: (Uruguay) Ariel Behar (Ecuador) Gonzalo Escobar
- Score: 6–3, 7–6^{(7–4)}

Events
Singles	men	women
Doubles	men	women
- Oracle Challenger Series – Houston

Austin Krajicek and Nicholas Monroe were the defending champions but chose not to defend their title.

Jonathan Erlich and Santiago González won the title after defeating Ariel Behar and Gonzalo Escobar 6–3, 7–6^{(7–4)} in the final.

== Seeds ==
1. (Israel) Jonathan Erlich / (Mexico) Santiago González (champions)
2. (United Kingdom) Luke Bambridge / (United States) Nathaniel Lammons (semifinals)
3. (Uruguay) Ariel Behar / (Ecuador) Gonzalo Escobar (final)
4. (Mexico) Miguel Ángel Reyes-Varela / (Brazil) Fernando Romboli (quarterfinals)

== Draw ==
Key

- Q = Qualifier
- WC = Wild card
- LL = Lucky loser
- Alt = Alternate
- ITF = ITF entry
- PR = Protected ranking
- SR = Special ranking
- SE = Special exempt
- JE = Junior exempt
- JR = Junior Accelerator Programme entrant
- CO = College Accelerator Programme entrant
- NG = Next Gen Accelerator Program entrant
- w/o = Walkover
- r = Retired
- d = Defaulted

First round
1	(Israel) J Erlich (Mexico) S González	6	6
WC	(United States) J Bendeck (United States) B Holt	1	2
(Switzerland) L Margaroli (Italy) A Vavassori	3	6	[7]
(India) S Balaji (India) J Nedunchezhiyan	6	4	[10]
4	(Mexico) MÁ Reyes-Varela (Brazil) F Romboli	6	6
(Venezuela) LD Martínez (Brazil) F Meligeni Alves	4	4
(United States) B Klahn (United States) J Withrow	4	6	[7]
PR	(Philippines) T Huey (Netherlands) S Verbeek	6	3	[10]
WC	(United States) S Bangoura (United States) G Nanda	6	6
WC	(United States) Mi Redlicki (United States) A Ritschard	2	2
(United States) R Galloway (Venezuela) R Maytín	4	0
3	(Uruguay) A Behar (Ecuador) G Escobar	6	6
(United States) E King (United States) H Reese	4	2
PR	(United States) N Pasha (United States) M Schnur	6	6
(Chinese Taipei) J Jung (United States) M Krueger	1	6^{4}
2	(United Kingdom) L Bambridge (United States) N Lammons	6	7^{7}

Quarterfinals
1	(Israel) J Erlich (Mexico) S González	6	7^{7}
(India) S Balaji (India) J Nedunchezhiyan	2	6^{4}
4	(Mexico) MÁ Reyes-Varela (Brazil) F Romboli	3	1
PR	(Philippines) T Huey (Netherlands) S Verbeek	6	6
WC	(United States) S Bangoura (United States) G Nanda	5	3
3	(Uruguay) A Behar (Ecuador) G Escobar	7	6
PR	(United States) N Pasha (United States) M Schnur	1	4
2	(United Kingdom) L Bambridge (United States) N Lammons	6	6

Semifinals
1	(Israel) J Erlich (Mexico) S González	2	7	[10]
PR	(Philippines) T Huey (Netherlands) S Verbeek	6	5	[3]
3	(Uruguay) A Behar (Ecuador) G Escobar	3	6	[10]
2	(United Kingdom) L Bambridge (United States) N Lammons	6	3	[8]

Final
1	(Israel) J Erlich (Mexico) S González	6	7^{7}
3	(Uruguay) A Behar (Ecuador) G Escobar	3	6^{4}
