= 2018 Oracle Challenger Series – Houston – Men's doubles =

Houston – Men's doubles
- 2018 Oracle Challenger Series – Houston

Final
- Champions: (United States) Austin Krajicek (United States) Nicholas Monroe
- Runners-up: (El Salvador) Marcelo Arévalo (United States) James Cerretani
- Score: 4–6, 7–6^{(7–3)}, [10–5]

Events
Singles	men	women
Doubles	men	women
- Oracle Challenger Series – Houston

This was the first edition of the tournament.

Austin Krajicek and Nicholas Monroe won the title after defeating Marcelo Arévalo and James Cerretani 4–6, 7–6^{(7–3)}, [10–5] in the final.

== Seeds ==
1. (United States) Austin Krajicek / (United States) Nicholas Monroe (champions)
2. (India) Leander Paes / (Mexico) Miguel Ángel Reyes-Varela (semifinals)
3. (El Salvador) Marcelo Arévalo / (United States) James Cerretani (final)
4. (United States) Robert Galloway / (United States) Nathan Pasha (semifinals)

== Draw ==
Key

- Q = Qualifier
- WC = Wild card
- LL = Lucky loser
- Alt = Alternate
- ITF = ITF entry
- PR = Protected ranking
- SR = Special ranking
- SE = Special exempt
- JE = Junior exempt
- JR = Junior Accelerator Programme entrant
- CO = College Accelerator Programme entrant
- NG = Next Gen Accelerator Program entrant
- w/o = Walkover
- r = Retired
- d = Defaulted

First round
1	(United States) A Krajicek (United States) N Monroe	7	6
(Chinese Taipei) J Jung (United States) J Withrow	5	2
WC	(United States) T Fawcett (United States) Evan Song	6	4	[8]
(United States) M Krueger (United States) T-S Kwiatkowski	2	6	[10]
4	(United States) R Galloway (United States) N Pasha	4	7^{9}	[10]
(Poland) K Majchrzak (Spain) R Ortega Olmedo	6	6^{7}	[8]
WC	(United States) JP Fruttero (United States) R Schneider	4	6	[10]
WC	(United States) Ma Redlicki (United States) Mi Redlicki	6	4	[8]
(Barbados) D King (Germany) D Köpfer	6	6
Alt	(Colombia) A Gómez (Colombia) A González	3	3
(Dominican Republic) J Hernández-Fernández (Italy) P Lorenzi	2	4
3	(El Salvador) M Arévalo (United States) J Cerretani	6	6
(Philippines) R Gonzales (United States) N Lammons	6^{4}	6^{5}
(United Kingdom) L Bambridge (United States) T Sandgren	7^{7}	7^{7}
(Switzerland) L Margaroli (Spain) D Vega Hernández	6	5	[6]
2	(India) L Paes (Mexico) MÁ Reyes-Varela	4	7	[10]

Quarterfinals
1	(United States) A Krajicek (United States) N Monroe	6	6
(United States) M Krueger (United States) T-S Kwiatkowski	3	4
4	(United States) R Galloway (United States) N Pasha	6	7^{7}
WC	(United States) JP Fruttero (United States) R Schneider	2	6^{5}
(Barbados) D King (Germany) D Köpfer	0	1
3	(El Salvador) M Arévalo (United States) J Cerretani	6	6
(United Kingdom) L Bambridge (United States) T Sandgren	6	6^{3}	[8]
2	(India) L Paes (Mexico) MÁ Reyes-Varela	1	7^{7}	[10]

Semifinals
1	(United States) A Krajicek (United States) N Monroe	3	7	[10]
4	(United States) R Galloway (United States) N Pasha	6	5	[5]
3	(El Salvador) M Arévalo (United States) J Cerretani	6	7^{9}
2	(India) L Paes (Mexico) MÁ Reyes-Varela	4	6^{7}

Final
1	(United States) A Krajicek (United States) N Monroe	4	7^{7}	[10]
3	(El Salvador) M Arévalo (United States) J Cerretani	6	6^{3}	[5]
