= 2019 Oracle Challenger Series – Houston – Women's singles =

Houston – Women's singles
- 2019 Oracle Challenger Series – Houston

Final
- Champion: (Belgium) Kirsten Flipkens
- Runner-up: (United States) CoCo Vandeweghe
- Score: 7–6^{(7–4)}, 6–4

Events
Singles	men	women
Doubles	men	women
← 2018 ·	Oracle Challenger Series – Houston	· 2020 →

Peng Shuai was the defending champion, but chose to compete in an ITF event in Tokyo instead.

Kirsten Flipkens won the title, defeating CoCo Vandeweghe in the final, 7–6^{(7–4)}, 6–4. Flipkens beat five American players in five matches on the way to her first WTA 125K series title.

== Seeds ==
All seeds received a bye into the second round.

1. (United States) Danielle Collins (second round)
2. (United States) Taylor Townsend (quarterfinals)
3. (Belgium) Kirsten Flipkens (champion)
4. (Ukraine) Katarina Zavatska (quarterfinals)
5. (Romania) Patricia Maria Țig (withdrew)
6. (United States) Caty McNally (quarterfinals)
7. (Switzerland) Stefanie Vögele (semifinals)
8. (United States) Francesca Di Lorenzo (second round, retired)
9. (United States) Whitney Osuigwe (second round)
10. (Luxembourg) Mandy Minella (quarterfinals)
11. (United States) Usue Maitane Arconada (third round)
12. (United States) Allie Kiick (second round)
13. (United States) Ann Li (third round)
14. (United States) Caroline Dolehide (third round)
15. (United States) Sachia Vickery (second round)
16. (United States) Varvara Lepchenko (second round)

== Draw ==
=== Key ===
- Q = Qualifier
- WC = Wild card
- LL = Lucky loser
- Alt = Alternate
- SE = Special exempt
- PR = Protected ranking
- ITF = ITF entry
- JE = Junior exempt
- w/o = Walkover
- r = Retired
- d = Defaulted
- SR = Special ranking

=== Finals ===
Quarterfinals
WC	(United States) CoCo Vandeweghe	6	6
10	(Luxembourg) Mandy Minella	1	4
4	(Ukraine) Katarina Zavatska	5	1
7	(Switzerland) Stefanie Vögele	7	6
6	(United States) Caty McNally	5	6	2
3	(Belgium) Kirsten Flipkens	7	4	6
PR	(United States) Irina Falconi	7	6
2	(United States) Taylor Townsend	5	1

Semifinals
WC	(United States) CoCo Vandeweghe	3	6	7
7	(Switzerland) Stefanie Vögele	6	4	5
3	(Belgium) Kirsten Flipkens	6	7
PR	(United States) Irina Falconi	3	5

Final
WC	(United States) CoCo Vandeweghe	6^{4}	4
3	(Belgium) Kirsten Flipkens	7^{7}	6

=== Top half ===
==== Section 1 ====
First round
(Ukraine) A Kalinina	6	6
(United States) G Min	3	4
WC	(United States) C Vandeweghe	6	6
WC	(Australia) L Huang	4	1
WC	(Serbia) K Jokić	6	6
LL	(United States) K Day	4	2
(Greece) V Grammatikopoulou	6^{4}	4
(Canada) E Bouchard	7^{7}	6

Second round
1/WC	(United States) D Collins	0	6	3
(Ukraine) A Kalinina	6	3	6
WC	(United States) C Vandeweghe	7	6
15	(United States) S Vickery	5	3
10	(Luxembourg) M Minella	1	6	6
WC	(Serbia) K Jokić	6	3	4
(Canada) E Bouchard	6	3
8	(United States) F Di Lorenzo	2	1^{r}

Third round
(Ukraine) A Kalinina	3	3
WC	(United States) C Vandeweghe	6	6
10	(Luxembourg) M Minella	2
(Canada) E Bouchard	1^{r}

Quarterfinals
WC	(United States) C Vandeweghe	6	6
10	(Luxembourg) M Minella	1	4

==== Section 2 ====
First round
(France) J Ponchet	4	7^{7}	7^{7}
Q	(United States) S Chang	6	6^{4}	6^{3}
(Serbia) O Danilović	6	7^{7}
(United States) S Rogers	3	6^{3}
(Brazil) G Cé	2	6	3
(United States) H Chang	6	3	6
(Serbia) J Jakšić	4	3
(Hungary) F Stollár	6	6

Second round
4	(Ukraine) K Zavatska	3	6	6
(France) J Ponchet	6	3	4
(Serbia) O Danilović	1	5
13	(United States) A Li	6	7
11	(United States) UM Arconada	6	6
(United States) H Chang	0	0
(Hungary) F Stollár	4	6	3
7	(Switzerland) S Vögele	6	3	6

Third round
4	(Ukraine) K Zavatska	6	6
13	(United States) A Li	3	3
11	(United States) UM Arconada	1	2
7	(Switzerland) S Vögele	6	6

Quarterfinals
4	(Ukraine) K Zavatska	5	1
7	(Switzerland) S Vögele	7	6

=== Bottom half ===
==== Section 3 ====
First round
(Japan) M Osaka	6	7
(Israel) D Khazaniuk	1	5
(Hungary) D Gálfi	6	7
(United States) J Loeb	1	5
Q	(United States) C Bellis	6	6
(Australia) E Perez	3	2
(United States) H Baptiste	6	6
(Bulgaria) E Kostova	2	4

Second round
6	(United States) C McNally	6	6
(Japan) M Osaka	2	0
(Hungary) D Gálfi	7	2	6
9	(United States) W Osuigwe	5	6	2
16	(United States) V Lepchenko	4	6	6^{5}
Q	(United States) C Bellis	6	4	7^{7}
(United States) H Baptiste	6	3	6^{4}
3	(Belgium) K Flipkens	3	6	7^{7}

Third round
6	(United States) C McNally	6	2	6
(Hungary) D Gálfi	0	6	3
Q	(United States) C Bellis	4	4
3	(Belgium) K Flipkens	6	6

Quarterfinals
6	(United States) C McNally	5	6	2
3	(Belgium) K Flipkens	7	4	6

==== Section 4 ====
First round
(Argentina) N Podoroska	4	1
PR	(United States) I Falconi	6	6
(United States) D Lao	3	4
WC	(United States) B Mattek-Sands	6	6
(United States) C Harrison	4	3
(Mexico) G Olmos	6	6
(Belarus) O Govortsova	2	6	3
(Kazakhstan) A Danilina	6	4	6

Second round
Alt	(United States) Q Gleason	7	5	2
PR	(United States) I Falconi	5	7	6
WC	(United States) B Mattek-Sands	6	6
12	(United States) A Kiick	0	0
14	(United States) C Dolehide	7	6
(Mexico) G Olmos	5	4
(Kazakhstan) A Danilina	2	4
2	(United States) T Townsend	6	6

Third round
PR	(United States) I Falconi	6	6
WC	(United States) B Mattek-Sands	1	3
14	(United States) C Dolehide	7	2	3
2	(United States) T Townsend	5	6	6

Quarterfinals
PR	(United States) I Falconi	7	6
2	(United States) T Townsend	5	1

== Qualifying ==
=== Seeds ===
1. (United States) Alexa Glatch (qualifying competition)
2. (Mexico) Giuliana Olmos (moved into main draw)

=== Qualifiers ===
1. (United States) Catherine Bellis
2. (United States) Sophie Chang

=== Lucky loser ===
1. (United States) Kayla Day

=== Qualifying draw ===
==== First qualifier ====
Qualifying competition
1/WC	(United States) Alexa Glatch	4	3
WC	(United States) Catherine Bellis	6	6

==== Second qualifier ====
Qualifying competition
Alt	(United States) Sophie Chang	6	3	6
	(United States) Kayla Day	3	6	3
