= 2019 Ladies Open Lausanne =

- Date: 15–21 July
- Edition: 27th
- Category: WTA International tournaments
- Draw: 32S / 16D
- Prize money: $250,000
- Surface: Clay
- Location: Lausanne, Switzerland
- Venue: Tennis Club Stade-Lausanne

Champions

Singles
- (France) Fiona Ferro

Doubles
- (Russia) Anastasia Potapova / (Russia) Yana Sizikova
← 2018 ·	WTA Swiss Open	· 2021 →

The 2019 Ladies Open Lausanne was a women's tennis tournament played on outdoor clay courts. It was the 27th edition of the tournament (the first to be held in Lausanne), and part of the International category of the 2019 WTA Tour. It took place at Tennis Club Stade-Lausanne in Lausanne, Switzerland, from 15 July through 21 July 2019.

== Points and prize money ==
=== Point distribution ===
Event	W	F	SF	QF	Round of 16	Round of 32	Q	Q2	Q1
Singles	280	180	110	60	30	1	18	12	1
Doubles	280	180	110	60	1	—	—	—	—

=== Prize money ===
Event	W	F	SF	QF	Round of 16	Round of 32	Q2	Q1
Singles	$43,000	$21,400	$11,500	$6,175	$3,400	$2,100	$1,020	$600
Doubles	$12,300	$6,400	$3,435	$1,820	$960	—	—	—

== Singles main draw entrants ==
=== Seeds ===
Country	Player	Rank^{1}	Seed
GER	Julia Görges	17	1
FRA	Caroline Garcia	23	2
FRA	Alizé Cornet	51	3
ROU	Mihaela Buzărnescu	53	4
GER	Tatjana Maria	65	5
~~UKR~~	~~Kateryna Kozlova~~	~~66~~	~~6~~
AUS	Daria Gavrilova	74	7
CAN	Eugenie Bouchard	79	8

- ^{1} Rankings are as of 1 July 2019.

=== Other entrants ===
The following players received wildcards into the main draw:

- (Switzerland) Ylena In-Albon
- (Switzerland) Tess Sugnaux
- (Switzerland) Simona Waltert

The following players received entry from the qualifying draw:

- (Italy) Giulia Gatto-Monticone
- (Russia) Varvara Gracheva
- (Austria) Barbara Haas
- (United States) Allie Kiick
- (Italy) Jasmine Paolini
- (Russia) Anastasia Potapova

The following players received entry as lucky losers:

- (China) Han Xinyun
- (Slovakia) Kristína Kučová

=== Withdrawals ===
- (Russia) Ekaterina Alexandrova → replaced by (Russia) Natalia Vikhlyantseva
- (Ukraine) Kateryna Kozlova → replaced by (China) Han Xinyun
- (Luxembourg) Mandy Minella → replaced by (Slovakia) Kristína Kučová
- (Czech Republic) Karolína Muchová → replaced by (Italy) Martina Trevisan
- (Russia) Evgeniya Rodina → replaced by (Luxembourg) Mandy Minella
- (Ukraine) Lesia Tsurenko → replaced by (Switzerland) Conny Perrin
- (China) Zhang Shuai → replaced by (Germany) Antonia Lottner

=== Retirements ===
- (Germany) Julia Görges (right forearm injury)

== Doubles main draw entrants ==
=== Seeds ===
Country	Player	Country	Player	Rank^{1}	Seed
AUS	Monique Adamczak	CHN	Han Xinyun	115	1
SUI	Timea Bacsinszky	ROU	Mihaela Buzărnescu	137	2
GER	Mona Barthel	SUI	Xenia Knoll	171	3
GEO	Oksana Kalashnikova	JPN	Ena Shibahara	172	4

- ^{1} Rankings are as of 1 July 2019.

=== Other entrants ===
The following pairs received wildcards into the doubles main draw:

- (Switzerland) Ylena In-Albon / (Switzerland) Conny Perrin
- (Switzerland) Tess Sugnaux / (Switzerland) Simona Waltert

=== Withdrawals ===
- (France) Pauline Parmentier (viral illness)

== Finals ==
=== Singles ===
- (France) Fiona Ferro defeated (France) Alizé Cornet 6–1, 2–6, 6–1

=== Doubles ===
- (Russia) Anastasia Potapova / (Russia) Yana Sizikova defeated (Australia) Monique Adamczak / (China) Han Xinyun, 6–2, 6–4
