= 2018 Ladies Championship Gstaad – Doubles =

Doubles
- 2018 Ladies Championship Gstaad

Final
- Champions: (Chile) Alexa Guarachi (United States) Desirae Krawczyk
- Runners-up: (Spain) Lara Arruabarrena (Switzerland) Timea Bacsinszky
- Score: 4–6, 6–4, [10–6]

Events
| Singles | Doubles |
| ← 2017 · | Ladies Championship Gstaad | · 2019 → |

Kiki Bertens and Johanna Larsson were the defending champions, but Bertens chose not to participate this year. Larsson played alongside Eugenie Bouchard, but lost in the first round to Rika Fujiwara and Darija Jurak.

Alexa Guarachi and Desirae Krawczyk won the title, defeating Lara Arruabarrena and Timea Bacsinszky in the final, 4–6, 6–4, [10–6]. This was the first WTA Tour title for both Guarachi and Krawczyk.

== Seeds ==
1. (Switzerland) Xenia Knoll / (Russia) Veronika Kudermetova (first round)
2. (United States) Kaitlyn Christian / (Mexico) Giuliana Olmos (first round)
3. (Canada) Eugenie Bouchard / (Sweden) Johanna Larsson (first round)
4. (Netherlands) Bibiane Schoofs / (Russia) Yana Sizikova (quarterfinals)

== Draw ==
=== Key ===
- Q = Qualifier
- WC = Wild card
- LL = Lucky loser
- Alt = Alternate
- SE = Special exempt
- PR = Protected ranking
- ITF = ITF entry
- JE = Junior exempt
- w/o = Walkover
- r = Retired
- d = Defaulted
- SR = Special ranking

=== Draw ===
First round
1 | (Switzerland) X Knoll (Russia) V Kudermetova | 3 | 7^{7} | [9]
(Switzerland) V Golubic (Switzerland) J Teichmann | 6 | 6^{3} | [11]
4 | (Netherlands) B Schoofs (Russia) Y Sizikova | 7^{7} | 6
(Germany) M Barthel (Luxembourg) M Minella | 6^{2} | 0
(Russia) A Panova (Kazakhstan) G Voskoboeva | 3 | 6 | [10]
WC | (France) A Hesse (Switzerland) L Küng | 6 | 4 | [4]
(Chile) A Guarachi (United States) D Krawczyk | 2 | 6 | [10]
Alt | (Germany) T Korpatsch (Latvia) D Marcinkēviča | 6 | 3 | [6]
(Japan) R Fujiwara (Croatia) D Jurak | 4 | 7 | [10]
3 | (Canada) E Bouchard (Sweden) J Larsson | 6 | 5 | [7]
WC | (Switzerland) C Perrin (Poland) K Piter | 2 | 6 | [6]
(Netherlands) Q Lemoine (Netherlands) E Wacanno | 6 | 4 | [10]
(Spain) S Soler Espinosa (Spain) S Sorribes Tormo | 6 | 6
2 | (United States) K Christian (Mexico) G Olmos | 1 | 3

Quarterfinals
(Switzerland) V Golubic (Switzerland) J Teichmann | 6^{5} | 5
(Spain) L Arruabarrena (Switzerland) T Bacsinszky | 7^{7} | 7
4 | (Netherlands) B Schoofs (Russia) Y Sizikova | 1 | 2
(Russia) A Panova (Kazakhstan) G Voskoboeva | 6 | 6
(Chile) A Guarachi (United States) D Krawczyk | 6 | 6
(Japan) R Fujiwara (Croatia) D Jurak | 1 | 2
(Netherlands) Q Lemoine (Netherlands) E Wacanno | 7^{7} | 4 | [9]
(Spain) S Soler Espinosa (Spain) S Sorribes Tormo | 6^{5} | 6 | [11]

Semifinals
(Spain) L Arruabarrena (Switzerland) T Bacsinszky | 3 | 7^{7} | [10]
(Russia) A Panova (Kazakhstan) G Voskoboeva | 6 | 6^{4} | [8]
(Chile) A Guarachi (United States) D Krawczyk | 1 | 6 | [10]
(Spain) S Soler Espinosa (Spain) S Sorribes Tormo | 6 | 2 | [5]

Final
(Spain) L Arruabarrena (Switzerland) T Bacsinszky | 6 | 4 | [6]
(Chile) A Guarachi (United States) D Krawczyk | 4 | 6 | [10]
