= 2018 Ladies Championship Gstaad – Singles =

Singles
- 2018 Ladies Championship Gstaad

Final
- Champion: (France) Alizé Cornet
- Runner-up: (Luxembourg) Mandy Minella
- Score: 6–4, 7–6^{(8–6)}

Events
Singles	Doubles
- Ladies Championship Gstaad

The singles competition of the 2018 Ladies Championship Gstaad tennis tournament was held in Gstaad, Switzerland from 16 to 22 July 2018. Kiki Bertens was the defending champion, but withdrew before the tournament began.

Alizé Cornet won the title, defeating Mandy Minella in the final, 6–4, 7–6^{(8–6)}.

This was the last tournament, that former World No. 4 Francesca Schiavone participated in. She lost to Samantha Stosur in the first round.

== Seeds ==
1. (France) Alizé Cornet (champion)
2. (Sweden) Johanna Larsson (second round)
3. (Slovakia) Viktória Kužmová (second round)
4. (Germany) Carina Witthöft (first round)
5. (Australia) Samantha Stosur (quarterfinals)
6. (Spain) Lara Arruabarrena (first round)
7. (Switzerland) Stefanie Vögele (first round)
8. (Switzerland) Viktorija Golubic (second round)

== Draw ==
Key

- Q = Qualifier
- WC = Wild card
- LL = Lucky loser
- Alt = Alternate
- ITF = ITF entry
- PR = Protected ranking
- SR = Special ranking
- SE = Special exempt
- JE = Junior exempt
- JR = Junior Accelerator Programme entrant
- CO = College Accelerator Programme entrant
- NG = Next Gen Accelerator Program entrant
- w/o = Walkover
- r = Retired
- d = Defaulted

=== Finals ===
Semifinals
1	(France) Alizé Cornet	7^{7}	1
(Canada) Eugenie Bouchard	6^{5}	0^{r}
(Czech Republic) Markéta Vondroušová	6	2	2
PR	(Luxembourg) Mandy Minella	4	6	6

Final
1	(France) Alizé Cornet	6	7^{8}
PR	(Luxembourg) Mandy Minella	4	6^{6}

=== Top half ===
First round
1	(France) A Cornet	6	6
Q	(Spain) S Soler Espinosa	2	2
PR	(China) S Zheng	1	6	5
Q	(Switzerland) C Perrin	6	4	7
Q	(Liechtenstein) K von Deichmann	6	2	3
WC	(Switzerland) P Schnyder	4	6	6
WC	(Italy) F Schiavone	3	2
5	(Australia) S Stosur	6	6
3	(Slovakia) V Kužmová	6	7
Q	(Italy) M Trevisan	2	5
(Switzerland) J Teichmann	4	6	2
Q	(Russia) V Kudermetova	6	1	6
(Canada) E Bouchard	4	7^{7}	6
(Switzerland) T Bacsinszky	6	6^{1}	4
(Germany) A Lottner	3	2
8	(Switzerland) V Golubic	6	6

Second round
1	(France) A Cornet	6	6
Q	(Switzerland) C Perrin	3	3
WC	(Switzerland) P Schnyder	4	1
5	(Australia) S Stosur	6	6
3	(Slovakia) V Kužmová	6^{4}	6^{5}
Q	(Russia) V Kudermetova	7^{7}	7^{7}
(Canada) E Bouchard	7^{7}	7^{9}
8	(Switzerland) V Golubic	6^{2}	6^{7}

Quarterfinals
1	(France) A Cornet	6	7^{7}
5	(Australia) S Stosur	4	6^{2}
Q	(Russia) V Kudermetova	5	0
(Canada) E Bouchard	7	6

Semifinals
1	(France) A Cornet	7^{7}	1
(Canada) E Bouchard	6^{5}	0^{r}

=== Bottom half ===
First round
6	(Spain) L Arruabarrena	3	3
(Czech Republic) M Vondroušová	6	6
(Bulgaria) E Kostova	6	0	6
(Russia) A Kalinskaya	4	6	2
(Russia) N Vikhlyantseva	4	6	2
(Germany) M Barthel	6	3	6
(Russia) E Rodina	6^{3}	6	7^{13}
4	(Germany) C Witthöft	7^{7}	4	6^{11}
7	(Switzerland) S Vögele	2	0
(Germany) T Korpatsch	6	6
(Spain) S Sorribes Tormo	7^{7}	6
Q	(Russia) V Ivakhnenko	6^{5}	1
PR	(Luxembourg) M Minella	6	7^{7}
(Czech Republic) T Martincová	3	6^{3}
WC	(Switzerland) L Küng	4	1
2	(Sweden) J Larsson	6	6

Second round
(Czech Republic) M Vondroušová	6	6
(Bulgaria) E Kostova	4	4
(Germany) M Barthel	4	6	5
(Russia) E Rodina	6	2	7
(Germany) T Korpatsch	2	2
(Spain) S Sorribes Tormo	6	6
PR	(Luxembourg) M Minella	6	6
2	(Sweden) J Larsson	3	4

Quarterfinals
(Czech Republic) M Vondroušová	6	6
(Russia) E Rodina	2	3
(Spain) S Sorribes Tormo	1	2
PR	(Luxembourg) M Minella	6	6

Semifinals
(Czech Republic) M Vondroušová	6	2	2
PR	(Luxembourg) M Minella	4	6	6

== Qualifying ==
=== Seeds ===
1. (Russia) Veronika Kudermetova (qualified)
2. (Switzerland) Conny Perrin (qualified)
3. (Liechtenstein) Kathinka von Deichmann (qualified)
4. (Russia) Valentyna Ivakhnenko (qualified)
5. (Italy) Martina Trevisan (qualified)
6. (Spain) Sílvia Soler Espinosa (qualified)
7. (Israel) Deniz Khazaniuk (first round)
8. (Italy) Jessica Pieri (qualifying competition)
9. (Austria) Barbara Haas (qualifying competition)
10. (France) Amandine Hesse (qualifying competition)
11. (Austria) Julia Grabher (first round)
12. (United States) Allie Kiick (qualifying competition)

=== Qualifiers ===
1. (Russia) Veronika Kudermetova
2. (Switzerland) Conny Perrin
3. (Liechtenstein) Kathinka von Deichmann
4. (Russia) Valentyna Ivakhnenko
5. (Italy) Martina Trevisan
6. (Spain) Sílvia Soler Espinosa

=== Draw ===
==== First qualifier ====
First round
1	(Russia) Veronika Kudermetova	6	6
WC	(Netherlands) Quirine Lemoine	2	2
WC	(Romania) Diana Mihail	0	1
8	(Italy) Jessica Pieri	6	6

Qualifying competition
1	(Russia) Veronika Kudermetova	6^{8}	6	6
8	(Italy) Jessica Pieri	7^{10}	1	2

==== Second qualifier ====
First round
2	(Switzerland) Conny Perrin	6	6
(Russia) Yana Sizikova	4	4
(Chile) Alexa Guarachi	4	6	6
11	(Austria) Julia Grabher	6	1	1

Qualifying competition
2	(Switzerland) Conny Perrin	6	6
(Chile) Alexa Guarachi	4	0

==== Third qualifier ====
First round
3	(Liechtenstein) Kathinka von Deichmann	6	6
(Latvia) Diāna Marcinkēviča	4	3
WC	(South Africa) Zoe Kruger	7	6
7	(Israel) Deniz Khazaniuk	5	3

Qualifying competition
3	(Liechtenstein) Kathinka von Deichmann	6	6
WC	(South Africa) Zoe Kruger	1	1

==== Fourth qualifier ====
First round
4	(Russia) Valentyna Ivakhnenko	6	6
(Bulgaria) Aleksandrina Naydenova	1	0
(Hungary) Gréta Arn	2	2
12	(United States) Allie Kiick	6	6

Qualifying competition
4	(Russia) Valentyna Ivakhnenko	6	6
12	(United States) Allie Kiick	1	2

==== Fifth qualifier ====
First round
5	(Italy) Martina Trevisan	4	7^{8}	6
(Poland) Katarzyna Piter	6	6^{6}	3
(Switzerland) Tess Sugnaux	2	2
10	(France) Amandine Hesse	6	6

Qualifying competition
5	(Italy) Martina Trevisan	6	6
10	(France) Amandine Hesse	3	4

==== Sixth qualifier ====
First round
6	(Spain) Sílvia Soler Espinosa	4	6	6
(France) Chloé Paquet	6	3	0
WC	(Switzerland) Xenia Knoll	6	3	3
9	(Austria) Barbara Haas	4	6	6

Qualifying competition
6	(Spain) Sílvia Soler Espinosa	6	6
9	(Austria) Barbara Haas	1	1
