= 2023 National Bank Open – Women's doubles =

Women's doubles
- 2023 National Bank Open

Final
- Champions: (Japan) Shuko Aoyama (Japan) Ena Shibahara
- Runners-up: (United States) Desirae Krawczyk (Netherlands) Demi Schuurs
- Score: 6–4, 4–6, [13–11]

Details
- Draw: 28
- Seeds: 8

Events
| Singles | men | women |
| Doubles | men | women |
- National Bank Open

Shuko Aoyama and Ena Shibahara defeated Desirae Krawczyk and Demi Schuurs in the final, 6–4, 4–6, [13–11] to win the women's doubles tennis title at the 2023 Canadian Open. Aoyama and Shibahara saved two championship points in the final.

Coco Gauff and Jessica Pegula were the defending champions, but withdrew before their quarterfinal match.

== Seeds ==
The top four seeds received a bye into the second round.

1. (United States) Coco Gauff / (United States) Jessica Pegula (quarterfinals, withdrew)
2. (Australia) Storm Hunter / (Belgium) Elise Mertens (semifinals)
3. (Czech Republic) Kateřina Siniaková / (Brazil) Luisa Stefani (second round)
4. (United States) Nicole Melichar-Martinez / (Australia) Ellen Perez (quarterfinals)
5. (United States) Desirae Krawczyk / (Netherlands) Demi Schuurs (final)
6. (Ukraine) Lyudmyla Kichenok / (Latvia) Jeļena Ostapenko (quarterfinals)
7. (Japan) Shuko Aoyama / (Japan) Ena Shibahara (champions)
8. (Chinese Taipei) Chan Hao-ching / (Mexico) Giuliana Olmos (first round)

== Draw ==
Key

- Q = Qualifier
- WC = Wild card
- LL = Lucky loser
- Alt = Alternate
- ITF = ITF entry
- PR = Protected ranking
- SR = Special ranking
- SE = Special exempt
- JE = Junior exempt
- JR = Junior Accelerator Programme entrant
- CO = College Accelerator Programme entrant
- NG = Next Gen Accelerator Program entrant
- w/o = Walkover
- r = Retired
- d = Defaulted

=== Finals ===
Semifinals
7 | (Japan) Shuko Aoyama (Japan) Ena Shibahara | 7^{7} | 7^{7}
(Chinese Taipei) Latisha Chan (China) Yang Zhaoxuan | 6^{4} | 6^{2}
5 | (United States) Desirae Krawczyk (Netherlands) Demi Schuurs | 6 | 3 | [11]
2 | (Australia) Storm Hunter (Belgium) Elise Mertens | 3 | 6 | [9]

Final
7 | (Japan) Shuko Aoyama (Japan) Ena Shibahara | 6 | 4 | [13]
5 | (United States) Desirae Krawczyk (Netherlands) Demi Schuurs | 4 | 6 | [11]

=== Top half ===
First round
(Japan) M Kato (Indonesia) A Sutjiadi | 6 | 7^{7}
(France) C Garcia (Croatia) P Martić | 2 | 6^{5}
(Egypt) M Sherif (United States) S Stephens | 2 | 1
(Germany) L Siegemund; V Zvonareva | 6 | 6
(Brazil) I Gamarra Martins; L Marozava | 3 | 6 | [4]
7 | (Japan) S Aoyama (Japan) E Shibahara | 6 | 3 | [10]
(Czech Republic) M Bouzková (China) L Zhu | 4 | 6 | [9]
WC | (Canada) M Stakusic (Canada) C Zhao | 6 | 3 | [11]
(Czech Republic) Ka Plíšková (Croatia) D Vekić | 3 | 6 | [8]
(Canada) G Dabrowski (New Zealand) E Routliffe | 6 | 4 | [10]
(Chinese Taipei) L Chan (China) Z Yang | 7^{7} | 7
8 | (Chinese Taipei) H-c Chan (Mexico) G Olmos | 6^{5} | 5

Second round
1 | (United States) C Gauff (United States) J Pegula | 6^{3} | 6 | [10]
(Japan) M Kato (Indonesia) A Sutjiadi | 7^{7} | 1 | [3]
(Germany) L Siegemund; V Zvonareva | 6 | 3 | [8]
7 | (Japan) S Aoyama (Japan) E Shibahara | 4 | 6 | [10]
4 | (United States) N Melichar-Martinez (Australia) E Perez | 3 | 6 | [10]
WC | (Canada) M Stakusic (Canada) C Zhao | 6 | 3 | [6]
(Canada) G Dabrowski (New Zealand) E Routliffe | 6 | 2 | [4]
(Chinese Taipei) L Chan (China) Z Yang | 2 | 6 | [10]

Quarterfinals
1 | (United States) C Gauff (United States) J Pegula
7 | (Japan) S Aoyama (Japan) E Shibahara | w/o
4 | (United States) N Melichar-Martinez (Australia) E Perez | 6 | 3 | [4]
(Chinese Taipei) L Chan (China) Z Yang | 2 | 6 | [10]

Semifinals
7 | (Japan) S Aoyama (Japan) E Shibahara | 7^{7} | 7^{7}
(Chinese Taipei) L Chan (China) Z Yang | 6^{4} | 6^{2}

=== Bottom half ===
First round
5 | (United States) D Krawczyk (Netherlands) D Schuurs | 6 | 6
(Japan) M Ninomiya (United States) S Santamaria | 0 | 2
(Kazakhstan) A Danilina (United States) B Mattek-Sands | 6 | 4 | [4]
(Czech Republic) K Muchová (Czech Republic) M Vondroušová | 0 | 6 | [10]
(Norway) U Eikeri (Estonia) I Neel | 6 | 6^{4} | [10]
(Chile) A Guarachi (Romania) M Niculescu | 3 | 7^{7} | [4]
6 | (Ukraine) L Kichenok (Latvia) J Ostapenko | 6^{6} | 6 | [10]
WC | (Canada) E Bouchard (Canada) R Marino | 7^{8} | 4 | [8]
Alt | (Poland) M Linette (United States) B Pera | 7^{11} | 7^{7}
(Ukraine) N Kichenok (United States) A Parks | 6^{9} | 6^{3}
(Ukraine) M Kostyuk (China) S Zhang | 6 | 6
(Slovakia) T Mihalíková (China) Y Xu | 3 | 4

Second round
5 | (United States) D Krawczyk (Netherlands) D Schuurs | 1
(Czech Republic) K Muchová (Czech Republic) M Vondroušová | 2^{r}
(Norway) U Eikeri (Estonia) I Neel | 6 | 6
3 | (Czech Republic) K Siniaková (Brazil) L Stefani | 1 | 2
6 | (Ukraine) L Kichenok (Latvia) J Ostapenko | 3 | 6 | [10]
Alt | (Poland) M Linette (United States) B Pera | 6 | 2 | [8]
(Ukraine) M Kostyuk (China) S Zhang | 4 | 1
2 | (Australia) S Hunter (Belgium) E Mertens | 6 | 6

Quarterfinals
5 | (United States) D Krawczyk (Netherlands) D Schuurs | 6 | 6
(Norway) U Eikeri (Estonia) I Neel | 3 | 3
6 | (Ukraine) L Kichenok (Latvia) J Ostapenko | 4 | 4
2 | (Australia) S Hunter (Belgium) E Mertens | 6 | 6

Semifinals
5 | (United States) D Krawczyk (Netherlands) D Schuurs | 6 | 3 | [11]
2 | (Australia) S Hunter (Belgium) E Mertens | 3 | 6 | [9]

== Seeded teams ==
The following are the seeded teams. Seedings are based on WTA rankings as of 31 July 2023.

| Country | Player | Country | Player | Rank^{1} | Seed |
|---|---|---|---|---|---|
| USA | Coco Gauff | USA | Jessica Pegula | 7 | 1 |
| AUS | Storm Hunter | BEL | Elise Mertens | 11 | 2 |
| CZE | Kateřina Siniaková | BRA | Luisa Stefani | 15 | 3 |
| USA | Nicole Melichar-Martinez | AUS | Ellen Perez | 17 | 4 |
| USA | Desirae Krawczyk | NED | Demi Schuurs | 23 | 5 |
| UKR | Lyudmyla Kichenok | LAT | Jeļena Ostapenko | 35 | 6 |
| JPN | Shuko Aoyama | JPN | Ena Shibahara | 40 | 7 |
| TPE | Chan Hao-ching | MEX | Giuliana Olmos | 40 | 8 |

== Other entry information ==
=== Wild cards ===
- (Canada) Eugenie Bouchard / (Canada) Rebecca Marino
- (Canada) Marina Stakusic / (Canada) Carol Zhao

=== Alternates ===
- (Poland) Magda Linette / (United States) Bernarda Pera

=== Withdrawals ===
- (United States) Jennifer Brady / (United States) Madison Keys → replaced by (Poland) Magda Linette / (United States) Bernarda Pera
