= 2018 Oracle Challenger Series – Houston – Women's singles =

Houston – Women's singles
- 2018 Oracle Challenger Series – Houston

Final
- Champion: (China) Peng Shuai
- Runner-up: (United States) Lauren Davis
- Score: 1–6, 7–5, 6–4

Events
| Singles | men | women |
| Doubles | men | women |
| Oracle Challenger Series – Houston | · 2019 → |

This was the first edition of the tournament.

Peng Shuai won the title, defeating Lauren Davis in the final 1–6, 7–5, 6–4.

== Seeds ==
1. (Switzerland) Belinda Bencic (second round)
2. (Romania) Monica Niculescu (withdrew)
3. (United Kingdom) Heather Watson (quarterfinals)
4. (United States) Jessica Pegula (semifinals)
5. (Hungary) Fanny Stollár (quarterfinals)
6. (United States) Varvara Lepchenko (second round)
7. (Russia) Sofya Zhuk (semifinals)
8. (Czech Republic) Marie Bouzková (first round)
9. (United States) Nicole Gibbs (second round)

== Draw ==
=== Key ===
- Q = Qualifier
- WC = Wild card
- LL = Lucky loser
- Alt = Alternate
- ITF = ITF entry
- PR = Protected ranking
- SR = Special ranking
- SE = Special exempt
- JE = Junior exempt
- JR = Junior Accelerator Programme entrant
- CO = College Accelerator Programme entrant
- NG = Next Gen Accelerator Program entrant
- w/o = Walkover
- r = Retired
- d = Defaulted

=== Finals ===
Semifinals
WC | (China) Peng Shuai | 6 | 6
4 | (United States) Jessica Pegula | 4 | 3
7 | (Russia) Sofya Zhuk | 6 | 3 | 0
Q | (United States) Lauren Davis | 3 | 6 | 6

Final
WC | (China) Peng Shuai | 1 | 7 | 6
Q | (United States) Lauren Davis | 6 | 5 | 4

=== Top half ===
First round
1/WC | (Switzerland) B Bencic | 2 | 7^{8} | 6
(United States) A Kiick | 6 | 6^{6} | 0
(Brazil) B Haddad Maia | 7^{7} | 5 | 1
WC | (China) S Peng | 6^{5} | 7 | 6
(United Kingdom) N Broady | 4 | 3
Q | (United States) W Osuigwe | 6 | 6
WC | (Australia) M Haet | 4 | 6^{3}
6 | (United States) V Lepchenko | 6 | 7^{7}
4 | (United States) J Pegula | 7^{10} | 6
(Italy) J Paolini | 6^{8} | 2
(Israel) D Khazaniuk | 7^{7} | 6
WC | (Italy) B Turati | 6^{5} | 2
Q | (United States) E Halbauer | 2 | 4
LL | (United States) J Cako | 6 | 6
Q | (United States) A Li | 5 | 3
5 | (Hungary) F Stollár | 7 | 6

Second round
1/WC | (Switzerland) B Bencic | 6 | 4 | 5
WC | (China) S Peng | 3 | 6 | 7
Q | (United States) W Osuigwe | 2 | 6 | 6
6 | (United States) V Lepchenko | 6 | 3 | 2
4 | (United States) J Pegula | 6 | 6
(Israel) D Khazaniuk | 2 | 1
LL | (United States) J Cako | 5 | 3
5 | (Hungary) F Stollár | 7 | 6

Quarterfinals
WC | (China) S Peng | 6 | 7^{7}
Q | (United States) W Osuigwe | 2 | 6^{3}
4 | (United States) J Pegula | 6 | 6
5 | (Hungary) F Stollár | 3 | 3

Semifinals
WC | (China) S Peng | 6 | 6
4 | (United States) J Pegula | 4 | 3

=== Bottom half ===
First round
7 | (Russia) S Zhuk | 6 | 6
(United States) G Min | 3 | 4
(Italy) D Chiesa | 5 | 1
Q | (Hungary) D Gálfi | 7 | 6
LL | (Hungary) RL Jani | 6 | 6
LL | (United States) L Chirico | 2 | 3
(United States) J Loeb | 7 | 1 | 1
3 | (United Kingdom) H Watson | 5 | 6 | 6
8 | (Czech Republic) M Bouzková | 4 | 6^{5}
LL | (Canada) K Sebov | 6 | 7^{7}
(Japan) K Nara | 6 | 6
(Russia) V Flink | 2 | 3
Q | (United States) L Davis | 6 | 6
Q | (Slovakia) K Kučová | 4 | 3
(United States) A Muhammad | 6^{3} | 6 | 1
9 | (United States) N Gibbs | 7^{7} | 4 | 6

Second round
7 | (Russia) S Zhuk | 4
Q | (Hungary) D Gálfi | 2^{r}
LL | (Hungary) RL Jani | 4 | 1
3 | (United Kingdom) H Watson | 6 | 6
LL | (Canada) K Sebov | 6 | 6
(Japan) K Nara | 3 | 3
Q | (United States) L Davis | 2 | 6 | 6
9 | (United States) N Gibbs | 6 | 4 | 4

Quarterfinals
7 | (Russia) S Zhuk | 7 | 6
3 | (United Kingdom) H Watson | 5 | 4
LL | (Canada) K Sebov | 1 | 3
Q | (United States) L Davis | 6 | 6

Semifinals
7 | (Russia) S Zhuk | 6 | 3 | 0
Q | (United States) L Davis | 3 | 6 | 6

== Qualifying ==
=== Seeds ===
1. (Canada) Katherine Sebov (qualifying competition, lucky loser)
2. (United States) Whitney Osuigwe (qualified)
3. (United States) Lauren Davis (qualified)
4. (United States) Grace Min (moved into main draw)
5. (Slovakia) Kristína Kučová (qualified)
6. (Norway) Ulrikke Eikeri (first round)
7. (Hungary) Dalma Gálfi (qualified)
8. (United States) Maria Mateas (first round)
9. (United States) Ann Li (qualified)
10. (Hungary) Réka Luca Jani (qualifying competition, lucky loser)
11. (United States) Elizabeth Halbauer (qualified)
12. (United States) Maria Sanchez (withdrew, still competing in Las Vegas)

=== Qualifiers ===
1. (Hungary) Dalma Gálfi
2. (United States) Whitney Osuigwe
3. (United States) Lauren Davis
4. (United States) Elizabeth Halbauer
5. (Slovakia) Kristína Kučová
6. (United States) Ann Li

=== Lucky losers ===
1. (United States) Jacqueline Cako
2. (Canada) Katherine Sebov
3. (Hungary) Réka Luca Jani
4. (United States) Louisa Chirico

=== Qualifying draw ===
==== First qualifier ====
First round
1 | (Canada) Katherine Sebov | 6 | 6
(United States) Tori Kinard | 1 | 2
(United States) Ingrid Neel | 5 | 1
7 | (Hungary) Dalma Gálfi | 7 | 6

Qualifying competition
1 | (Canada) Katherine Sebov | 4 | 7^{7} | 2
7 | (Hungary) Dalma Gálfi | 6 | 6^{5} | 6

==== Second qualifier ====
First round
2 | (United States) Whitney Osuigwe | 6 | 6
Alt | (Indonesia) Beatrice Gumulya | 1 | 1
(Chile) Alexa Guarachi | 6 | 0 | 0
10 | (Hungary) Réka Luca Jani | 4 | 6 | 6

Qualifying competition
2 | (United States) Whitney Osuigwe | 6 | 6
10 | (Hungary) Réka Luca Jani | 3 | 4

==== Third qualifier ====
First round
3 | (United States) Lauren Davis | 6 | 5 | 6
(United States) Maegan Manasse | 2 | 7 | 0
(United States) Jacqueline Cako | 6 | 6
Alt | (New Zealand) Erin Routliffe | 1 | 3

Qualifying competition
3 | (United States) Lauren Davis | 6 | 6
(United States) Jacqueline Cako | 3 | 4

==== Fourth qualifier ====
First round
WC | (Belgium) Victoria Smirnova | 6^{7} | 5
WC | (United States) Julia Elbaba | 7^{9} | 7
WC | (Republic of Ireland) Anna Bowtell | 3 | 5
11 | (United States) Elizabeth Halbauer | 6 | 7

Qualifying competition
WC | (United States) Julia Elbaba | 7^{7} | 3 | 4
11 | (United States) Elizabeth Halbauer | 6^{4} | 6 | 6

==== Fifth qualifier ====
First round
5 | (Slovakia) Kristína Kučová | 6 | 6
(Australia) Olivia Tjandramulia | 4 | 2
(United States) Louisa Chirico | 7 | 6
8 | (United States) Maria Mateas | 5 | 3

Qualifying competition
5 | (Slovakia) Kristína Kučová | 7^{7} | 6
(United States) Louisa Chirico | 6^{4} | 4

==== Sixth qualifier ====
First round
6 | (Norway) Ulrikke Eikeri | 0 | 4
(United States) Sanaz Marand | 6 | 6
(Montenegro) Ana Veselinović | 3 | 1
9 | (United States) Ann Li | 6 | 6

Qualifying competition
(United States) Sanaz Marand | 6 | 3 | 3
9 | (United States) Ann Li | 4 | 6 | 6
