= 2019 Ladies Open Lausanne – Singles =

Singles
- 2019 Ladies Open Lausanne

Final
- Champion: (France) Fiona Ferro
- Runner-up: (France) Alizé Cornet
- Score: 6–1, 2–6, 6–1

Events
Singles	Doubles
- WTA Swiss Open

Alizé Cornet was the defending champion, but lost in the final.

Fiona Ferro won her first career WTA Tour singles title, defeating Cornet in the final, 6–1, 2–6, 6–1.

== Seeds ==
1. (Germany) Julia Görges (first round, retired)
2. (France) Caroline Garcia (second round)
3. (France) Alizé Cornet (final)
4. (Romania) Mihaela Buzărnescu (second round)
5. (Germany) Tatjana Maria (first round)
6. (Ukraine) Kateryna Kozlova (withdrew)
7. (Australia) Daria Gavrilova (second round)
8. (Canada) Eugenie Bouchard (first round)

Note: Anastasia Potapova, who entered late and played in the qualifying tournament, would have been seeded 7th if she had entered the tournament prior to the initial entry cutoff date of 3 June 2019.

== Draw ==
Key

- Q = Qualifier
- WC = Wild card
- LL = Lucky loser
- Alt = Alternate
- ITF = ITF entry
- PR = Protected ranking
- SR = Special ranking
- SE = Special exempt
- JE = Junior exempt
- JR = Junior Accelerator Programme entrant
- CO = College Accelerator Programme entrant
- NG = Next Gen Accelerator Program entrant
- w/o = Walkover
- r = Retired
- d = Defaulted

=== Finals ===
Semifinals
(Germany) Tamara Korpatsch	3	4
3	(France) Alizé Cornet	6	6
(France) Fiona Ferro	6	6
(United States) Bernarda Pera	1	4

Final
3	(France) Alizé Cornet	1	6	1
(France) Fiona Ferro	6	2	6

=== Top half ===
First round
1	(Germany) J Görges	7^{7}	4	2^{r}
WC	(Switzerland) S Waltert	6^{5}	6	3
(Switzerland) T Bacsinszky	2	7	1
(Switzerland) J Teichmann	6	5	6
LL	(Slovakia) K Kučová	3	1
Q	(Russia) A Potapova	6	6
(Germany) T Korpatsch	2	6	7
8	(Canada) E Bouchard	6	4	5
3	(France) A Cornet	6	6
(Italy) M Trevisan	4	4
Q	(Italy) J Paolini	6	6
WC	(Switzerland) T Sugnaux	3	3
(Switzerland) C Perrin	6^{4}	6	3
(Russia) N Vikhlyantseva	7^{7}	4	6
WC	(Switzerland) Y In-Albon	5	6	3
7	(Australia) D Gavrilova	7	4	6

Second round
WC	(Switzerland) S Waltert	3	3
(Switzerland) J Teichmann	6	6
Q	(Russia) A Potapova	3	6	1
(Germany) T Korpatsch	6	3	6
3	(France) A Cornet	6	6
Q	(Italy) J Paolini	1	1
(Russia) N Vikhlyantseva	6	6
7	(Australia) D Gavrilova	3	2

Quarterfinals
(Switzerland) J Teichmann	6	0	1
(Germany) T Korpatsch	3	6	6
3	(France) A Cornet	4	6	6
(Russia) N Vikhlyantseva	6	1	3

Semifinals
(Germany) T Korpatsch	3	4
3	(France) A Cornet	6	6

=== Bottom half ===
First round
5	(Germany) T Maria	1	0
Q	(United States) A Kiick	6	6
(Australia) S Stosur	4	7	6
Q	(Austria) B Haas	6	5	3
(Germany) M Barthel	6^{3}	2
(France) F Ferro	7^{7}	6
(Switzerland) S Vögele	6	1	0
4	(Romania) M Buzărnescu	1	6	6
LL	(China) X Han	6	7^{7}
Q	(Russia) V Gracheva	4	6^{3}
(Russia) L Samsonova	6	3	6
(France) P Parmentier	0	6	3
(United States) B Pera	6	6
Q	(Italy) G Gatto-Monticone	0	3
(Germany) A Lottner	2	3
2	(France) C Garcia	6	6

Second round
Q	(United States) A Kiick	3	5
(Australia) S Stosur	6	7
(France) F Ferro	1	7^{7}	7
4	(Romania) M Buzărnescu	6	6^{2}	5
LL	(China) X Han	7	6
(Russia) L Samsonova	5	4
(United States) B Pera	6	6
2	(France) C Garcia	2	4

Quarterfinals
(Australia) S Stosur	4	2
(France) F Ferro	6	6
LL	(China) X Han	0	7	3
(United States) B Pera	6	5	6

Semifinals
(France) F Ferro	6	6
(United States) B Pera	1	4

== Qualifying ==
=== Seeds ===
1. (Russia) Anastasia Potapova (qualified)
2. (United States) Allie Kiick (qualified)
3. (Italy) Jasmine Paolini (qualified)
4. (Slovakia) Kristína Kučová (qualifying competition, lucky loser)
5. (France) Chloé Paquet (first round)
6. (Austria) Barbara Haas (qualified)
7. (Italy) Giulia Gatto-Monticone (qualified)
8. (Slovakia) Jana Čepelová (first round)
9. (China) Han Xinyun (qualifying competition, lucky loser)
10. (Japan) Kurumi Nara (withdrew)
11. (Argentina) Paula Ormaechea (qualifying competition)
12. (Greece) Valentini Grammatikopoulou (first round)

=== Qualifiers ===
1. (Russia) Anastasia Potapova
2. (United States) Allie Kiick
3. (Italy) Jasmine Paolini
4. (Italy) Giulia Gatto-Monticone
5. (Russia) Varvara Gracheva
6. (Austria) Barbara Haas

=== Lucky losers ===
1. (Slovakia) Kristína Kučová
2. (China) Han Xinyun

=== Draw ===
==== First qualifier ====
First round
1	(Russia) Anastasia Potapova	6	6
Alt	(New Zealand) Erin Routliffe	2	4
(Latvia) Diāna Marcinkēviča	4	7	5
11	(Argentina) Paula Ormaechea	6	5	7

Qualifying competition
1	(Russia) Anastasia Potapova	6	6
11	(Argentina) Paula Ormaechea	2	1

==== Second qualifier ====
First round
2	(United States) Allie Kiick	6	6
WC	(South Africa) Zoe Kruger	4	2
(Czech Republic) Renata Voráčová	3	3
Alt	(Japan) Ena Shibahara	6	6

Qualifying competition
2	(United States) Allie Kiick	6	6
Alt	(Japan) Ena Shibahara	2	3

==== Third qualifier ====
First round
3	(Italy) Jasmine Paolini	7^{7}	7^{7}
WC	(Switzerland) Joanne Züger	6^{3}	6^{4}
WC	(Switzerland) Leonie Küng	1	7	4
9	(China) Han Xinyun	6	5	6

Qualifying competition
3	(Italy) Jasmine Paolini	7^{7}	6
9	(China) Han Xinyun	6^{2}	1

==== Fourth qualifier ====
First round
4	(Slovakia) Kristína Kučová	7	4	6
(Liechtenstein) Kathinka von Deichmann	5	6	3
(Australia) Alison Bai	3	2
7	(Italy) Giulia Gatto-Monticone	6	6

Qualifying competition
4	(Slovakia) Kristína Kučová	6^{4}	4
7	(Italy) Giulia Gatto-Monticone	7^{7}	6

==== Fifth qualifier ====
First round
5	(France) Chloé Paquet	3	5
(Russia) Varvara Gracheva	6	7
(Austria) Julia Grabher	3	6	6
8	(Slovakia) Jana Čepelová	6	3	3

Qualifying competition
(Russia) Varvara Gracheva	6	6
(Austria) Julia Grabher	2	0

==== Sixth qualifier ====
First round
6	(Austria) Barbara Haas	6	6
(Ukraine) Ganna Poznikhirenko	2	2
WC	(Switzerland) Pauline Wuarin	1	6	6
12	(Greece) Valentini Grammatikopoulou	6	4	3

Qualifying competition
6	(Austria) Barbara Haas	6	6
WC	(Switzerland) Pauline Wuarin	0	0

== Sources ==
- Main Draw
- Qualifying Draw
