= 2018 Oracle Challenger Series – Houston – Women's doubles =

Houston – Women's doubles
- 2018 Oracle Challenger Series – Houston

Final
- Champions: (United States) Maegan Manasse (United States) Jessica Pegula
- Runners-up: (United States) Desirae Krawczyk (Mexico) Giuliana Olmos
- Score: 1–6, 6–4, [10–8]

Events
Singles	men	women
Doubles	men	women
Oracle Challenger Series – Houston	· 2019 →

This was the first edition of the tournament.

Maegan Manasse and Jessica Pegula won the title, defeating Desirae Krawczyk and Giuliana Olmos in the final, 1–6, 6–4, [10–8].

== Seeds ==
1. (United Kingdom) Naomi Broady / (United States) Sabrina Santamaria (first round)
2. (United States) Asia Muhammad / (United States) Maria Sanchez (first round)
3. (United States) Desirae Krawczyk / (Mexico) Giuliana Olmos (final)
4. (Chile) Alexa Guarachi / (New Zealand) Erin Routliffe (first round)

== Draw ==
=== Key ===
- Q = Qualifier
- WC = Wild card
- LL = Lucky loser
- Alt = Alternate
- ITF = ITF entry
- PR = Protected ranking
- SR = Special ranking
- SE = Special exempt
- JE = Junior exempt
- JR = Junior Accelerator Programme entrant
- CO = College Accelerator Programme entrant
- NG = Next Gen Accelerator Program entrant
- w/o = Walkover
- r = Retired
- d = Defaulted

=== Draw ===
First round
1	(United Kingdom) N Broady (United States) S Santamaria	5	2
(United States) Q Gleason (Brazil) L Stefani	7	6
(United States) J Elbaba (Australia) O Tjandramulia	6	6
(Hungary) D Gálfi (Hungary) RL Jani	4	1
4	(Chile) A Guarachi (New Zealand) E Routliffe	4	2
(United States) M Manasse (United States) J Pegula	6	6
(Indonesia) B Gumulya (Montenegro) A Veselinović	6	3	[10]
(Kazakhstan) A Danilina (Norway) U Eikeri	3	6	[6]
WC	(Republic of Ireland) A Bowtell (Belgium) V Smirnova	w/o
(Italy) D Chiesa (Italy) J Paolini
(United States) S Marand (United States) W Osuigwe	3	6^{7}
3	(United States) D Krawczyk (Mexico) G Olmos	6	7^{9}
(United States) E Halbauer (United States) M Kobelt	5	4
(Indonesia) J Rompies (Netherlands) R van der Hoek	7	6
(United States) A Mueller (United States) I Neel	6	6
2	(United States) A Muhammad (United States) M Sanchez	1	4

Quarterfinals
(United States) Q Gleason (Brazil) L Stefani	6	3	[6]
(United States) J Elbaba (Australia) O Tjandramulia	1	6	[10]
(United States) M Manasse (United States) J Pegula	6	6
(Indonesia) B Gumulya (Montenegro) A Veselinović	1	4
WC	(Republic of Ireland) A Bowtell (Belgium) V Smirnova	4	3
3	(United States) D Krawczyk (Mexico) G Olmos	6	6
(Indonesia) J Rompies (Netherlands) R van der Hoek
(United States) A Mueller (United States) I Neel	w/o

Semifinals
(United States) J Elbaba (Australia) O Tjandramulia	4	2
(United States) M Manasse (United States) J Pegula	6	6
3	(United States) D Krawczyk (Mexico) G Olmos	6^{6}	6	[10]
(United States) A Mueller (United States) I Neel	7^{8}	4	[7]

Final
(United States) M Manasse (United States) J Pegula	1	6	[10]
3	(United States) D Krawczyk (Mexico) G Olmos	6	4	[8]
