= 2019 Oracle Challenger Series – Houston =

- Date: November 10–17
- Edition: 2nd
- Category: ATP Challenger Tour; WTA 125K series
- Prize money: $162,480+H (ATP) $162,480 (WTA)
- Surface: Hard, outdoor
- Location: Houston, United States
- Venue: George R. Brown Tennis Center

Champions

Men's singles
- (United States) Marcos Giron

Women's singles
- (Belgium) Kirsten Flipkens

Men's doubles
- (Israel) Jonathan Erlich / (Mexico) Santiago González

Women's doubles
- (Australia) Ellen Perez / (Brazil) Luisa Stefani
- Oracle Challenger Series – Houston

The 2019 Oracle Challenger Series – Houston was a professional tennis tournament played on outdoor hard courts. This tournament was part of the 2019 ATP Challenger Tour and the 2019 WTA 125K series. The second edition took place at the George R. Brown Tennis Center from November 10 to 17, 2019 in Houston, United States.

== Men's singles main-draw entrants ==
=== Seeds ===
Country	Player	Rank^{1}	Seed
USA	Tennys Sandgren	69	1
USA	Bradley Klahn	105	2
CRO	Ivo Karlović	106	3
USA	Marcos Giron	124	4
TPE	Jason Jung	130	5
AUS	Christopher O'Connell	140	6
BAR	Darian King	165	7
USA	Mitchell Krueger	196	8
RUS	Alexey Vatutin	197	9
USA	Donald Young	233	10
ESP	Adrián Menéndez Maceiras	236	11
SRB	Peđa Krstin	238	12
USA	Jenson Brooksby	274	13
USA	Michael Mmoh	294	14
USA	Michael Redlicki	315	15
USA	Sekou Bangoura	317	16

- ^{1} Rankings are as of 4 November 2019.

=== Other entrants ===
The following players received wildcards into the singles main draw:

- (Egypt) Mohamed Abdel-Aziz
- (United States) Oliver Crawford
- (United States) Brandon Holt
- (United States) Zane Khan
- (United States) Sumit Sarkar

The following players received entry from the qualifying draw:

- (United States) Alafia Ayeni
- (Canada) Alexis Galarneau

== Women's singles main-draw entrants ==
=== Seeds ===
Country	Player	Rank^{1}	Seed
USA	Danielle Collins	31	1
USA	Taylor Townsend	84	2
BEL	Kirsten Flipkens	95	3
UKR	Katarina Zavatska	110	4
~~ROU~~	~~Patricia Maria Țig~~	~~111~~	~~5~~
USA	Caty McNally	118	6
SUI	Stefanie Vögele	119	7
USA	Francesca Di Lorenzo	121	8
USA	Whitney Osuigwe	132	9
LUX	Mandy Minella	137	10
USA	Usue Maitane Arconada	140	11
USA	Allie Kiick	147	12
USA	Ann Li	148	13
USA	Caroline Dolehide	154	14
USA	Sachia Vickery	158	15
USA	Varvara Lepchenko	170	15

- ^{1} Rankings are as of 4 November 2019.

=== Other entrants ===
The following players received wildcards into the singles main draw:

- (United States) Danielle Collins
- (Australia) Linda Huang
- (Serbia) Katarina Jokić
- (United States) Bethanie Mattek-Sands
- (United States) CoCo Vandeweghe

The following player received entry into the singles main draw through protected ranking:

- (United States) Irina Falconi

The following players received entry from the qualifying draw:

- (United States) Catherine Bellis
- (United States) Sophie Chang

The following player received entry into the main draw as lucky loser:

- (United States) Kayla Day

=== Withdrawals ===
- (Italy) Sara Errani → replaced by (Hungary) Fanny Stollár
- (Australia) Jaimee Fourlis → replaced by (United States) Hanna Chang
- (Japan) Mayo Hibi → replaced by (United States) Kayla Day
- (Poland) Katarzyna Kawa → replaced by (United States) Grace Min
- (Slovakia) Kristína Kučová → replaced by (Japan) Mari Osaka
- (Russia) Anastasiya Komardina → replaced by (United States) Catherine Harrison
- (United States) Asia Muhammad → replaced by (Israel) Deniz Khazaniuk
- (United States) Jessica Pegula → replaced by (United States) Hailey Baptiste
- (Australia) Olivia Rogowska → replaced by (Brazil) Gabriela Cé
- (Canada) Katherine Sebov → replaced by (Mexico) Giuliana Olmos
- (United Kingdom) Katie Swan → replaced by (Kazakhstan) Anna Danilina
- (Romania) Patricia Maria Țig → replaced by (United States) Quinn Gleason

== Women's doubles main-draw entrants ==
=== Seeds ===
Country	Player	Country	Player	Rank^{1}	Seed
CAN	Sharon Fichman	JPN	Ena Shibahara	119	1
AUS	Ellen Perez	BRA	Luisa Stefani	140	2
MEX	Giuliana Olmos	USA	Sabrina Santamaria	143	3
HUN	Fanny Stollár	USA	Taylor Townsend	180	4

- ^{1} Rankings as of 4 November 2019.

=== Other entrants ===
The following pair received a wildcard into the doubles main draw:

- (United States) Hailey Baptiste / (United States) Ellie Douglas

== Champions ==
=== Men's singles ===
- (United States) Marcos Giron def (Croatia) Ivo Karlović 7–5, 6–7^{(5–7)}, 7–6^{(11–9)}.

=== Women's singles ===
- (Belgium) Kirsten Flipkens def. (United States) CoCo Vandeweghe 7–6^{(7–4)}, 6–4

=== Men's doubles ===
- (Israel) Jonathan Erlich / (Mexico) Santiago González def. (Uruguay) Ariel Behar / (Ecuador) Gonzalo Escobar 6–3, 7–6^{(7–4)}.

=== Women's doubles ===
- (Australia) Ellen Perez / (Brazil) Luisa Stefani def. (Canada) Sharon Fichman / (Japan) Ena Shibahara, 1–6, 6–4, [10–5]
