= Desirae Krawczyk =

American tennis player (born 1994)

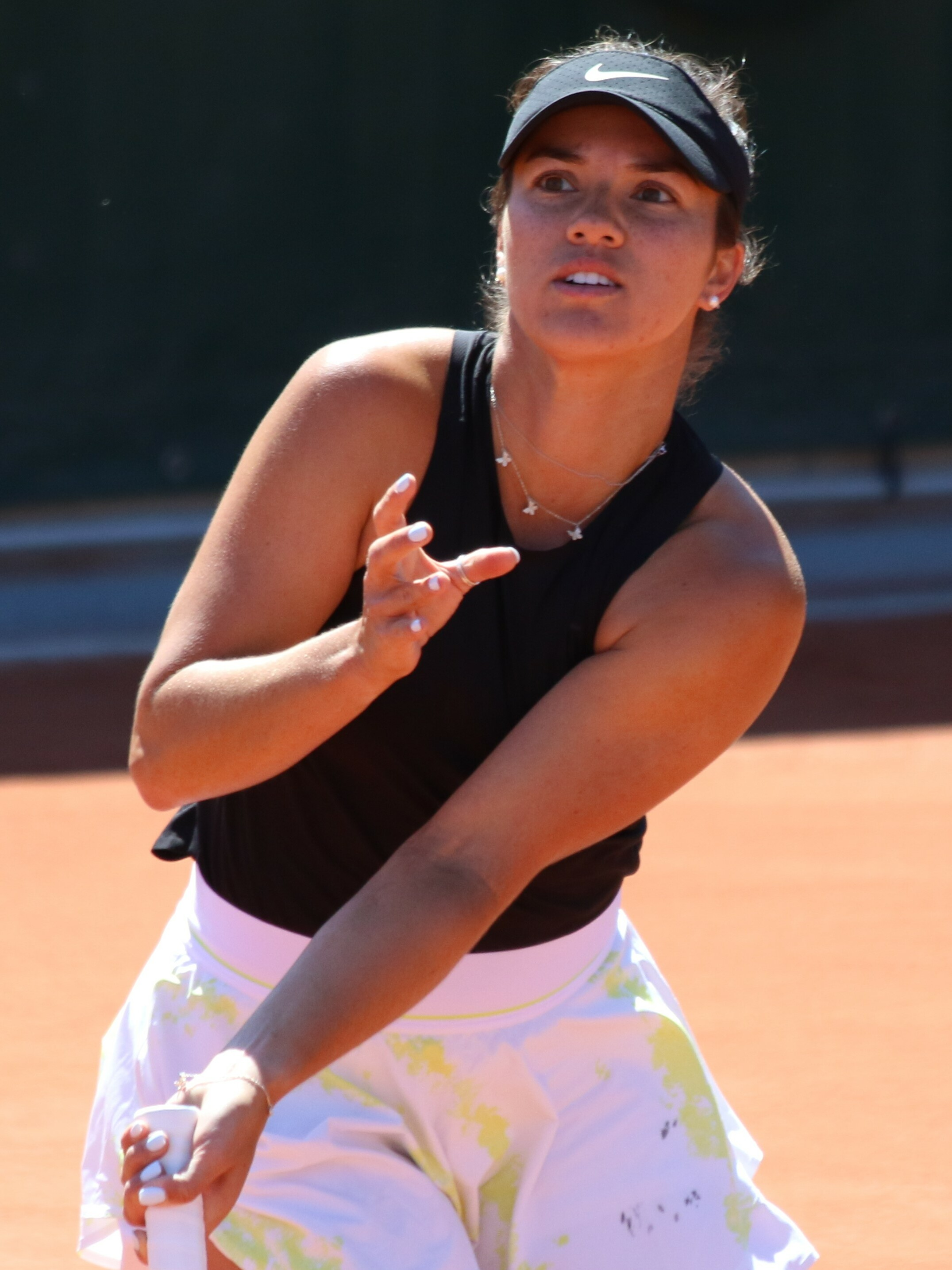
- Krawczyk at the 2022 French Open
- Country (sports): United States
- Residence: Palm Desert, California, US
- Born: January 11, 1994 (age 32) Rancho Mirage, California, US
- Height: 1.70 m (5 ft 7 in)
- Plays: Left-handed (two-handed backhand)
- College: ASU (2013–2016)
- Prize money: $3,173,338

Singles
- Career record: 40–31
- Career titles: 0
- Highest ranking: No. 752 (October 9, 2017)

Doubles
- Career record: 297–236
- Career titles: 14
- Highest ranking: No. 7 (August 19, 2024)
- Current ranking: No. 32 (October 19, 2026)

Grand Slam doubles results
- Australian Open: QF (2023)
- French Open: F (2020)
- Wimbledon: SF (2022, 2024, 2025)
- US Open: SF (2021)

Other doubles tournaments
- Tour Finals: SF (2022)
- Olympic Games: 2R (2024)

Mixed doubles
- Career titles: 4

Grand Slam mixed doubles results
- Australian Open: F (2024)
- French Open: W (2021)
- Wimbledon: W (2021, 2022)
- US Open: W (2021)
- Last updated on: October 22, 2026.

Desirae Marie Krawczyk (English: /ˈdɛzəreɪ ˈkrævtʃɪk/ DEZ-ər-ay KRAV-chik, Polish: [ˈkraft͡ʂɨk]; born January 11, 1994) is an American professional tennis player who specializes in doubles. She has a career-high doubles ranking of world No. 7, achieved in August 2024, and has won fourteen doubles titles on the WTA Tour, including the WTA 1000 Canadian Open in 2024.

Krawczyk is a four-time major champion in mixed doubles, having won the 2021 French and US Opens, partnering with Joe Salisbury, as well as the 2021 and 2022 Wimbledon Championships, alongside Neal Skupski. She was also runner-up at the 2020 French Open in women's doubles, partnering Alexa Guarachi, and the pair were semifinalists at the 2021 US Open.

== Early and personal life ==
Krawczyk is of Polish descent on her father's side, and of Filipino descent on her mother's side.

As of 2020, she is in a relationship with Australian tennis player Andrew Harris.

== Career ==
=== 2018–2019: WTA Tour doubles title and major debut ===
In April 2018, Krawczyk made her first WTA Tour doubles final at Monterrey, partnering Giuliana Olmos. She won her maiden WTA Tour doubles title at the Swiss Open that July, partnering Alexa Guarachi. She made her major debut at the 2018 US Open, winning a match alongside Monique Adamczak. In June 2019, she won her second tour title at Nottingham, partnering with Olmos.

=== 2020: First major doubles final ===
Krawczyk won her third and fourth titles at Acapulco (with Giuliana Olmos) and Istanbul (with Alexa Guarachi). She reached her first major final at the French Open women's doubles event, partnering with Guarachi. The pair finished runners-up to Tímea Babos and Kristina Mladenovic. Krawczyk finished the year ranked No. 25.

=== 2021: Three major mixed doubles titles, WTA Finals debut ===
Partnering Joe Salisbury in mixed doubles, Krawczyk reached the semifinals of the Australian Open.

Alongside Salisbury, Krawczyk won the mixed doubles title at the French Open, her first major title. The pair defeated Elena Vesnina and Aslan Karatsev in the final.

Partnered with Neal Skupski, Krawczyk won a second major title in mixed doubles at Wimbledon, defeating Salisbury and Harriet Dart in the final.

Seeded second, she reached her third mixed-doubles final at the US Open, again with Salisbury. They won the title, defeating Giuliana Olmos and Marcelo Arevalo in straight sets. She became the first player to win three Grand Slam mixed-doubles titles in a year since Martina Hingis and Leander Paes in 2015. At the same event, she reached the semifinals of women's doubles with Alexa Guarachi, where the pair lost to eventual champions Samantha Stosur and Zhang Shuai.

Guarachi and Krawczyk made their debuts at the WTA Finals, having won two titles at Adelaide and Strasbourg. They were eliminated in the group stage after winning one match. Krawczyk finished the year ranked No. 17.

=== 2022: Wimbledon mixed-doubles title, doubles top 10 debut ===
Krawczyk won her eighth doubles title at Stuttgart, alongside Demi Schuurs. At the Madrid Open, she reached her first WTA 1000 doubles final. Again with Schuurs, she lost to Giuliana Olmos and Gabriela Dabrowski.

At the Wimbledon Championships, she won her second consecutive title at this major in mixed doubles, partnering again with Neal Skupski, and fourth title overall. At the same tournament, partnering with Danielle Collins, she reached the semifinals in doubles for the third time at a major in her career. She made her top 10 debut in the doubles rankings on July 11, 2022.

Krawczyk and Schuurs reached the quarterfinals at the US Open, where they lost to Caty McNally and Taylor Townsend.

In October, she qualified for her second consecutive WTA Finals with Schuurs. The pair reached the semifinals, where they lost to eventual champions Veronika Kudermetova and Elise Mertens. Krawczyk finished the year ranked No. 16.

=== 2023: Tenth title, second WTA 1000 final, world No. 8 ===
Partnering Demi Schuurs, Krawczyk reached the quarterfinals of the Australian Open, where the pair lost to eventual champions Barbora Krejčíková and Kateřina Siniaková. Partnering Neal Skupski, she attempted to complete the career Grand Slam in mixed doubles, but the pair lost to Rohan Bopanna and the retiring Sania Mirza in the semifinals.

At the Charleston Open, partnering with Danielle Collins, she won her eighth doubles title defeating top seeds Giuliana Olmos and Ena Shibahara. As a result, she reached a new career-high doubles ranking of world No. 9, on April 10, 2023.

Krawczyk and Schuurs defended their title at Stuttgart, defeating Nicole Melichar-Martinez and Olmos in the final. Schuurs and Krawczyk won at the Eastbourne International as well, defeating Melichar-Martinez and Ellen Perez. Eastbourne was Krawczyk's tenth doubles title and fifth at the WTA 500 level.

She reached a new career-high ranking of No. 8 on August 14, 2023 following her second WTA 1000 final at the Canadian Open. She and Schuurs lost to Shuko Aoyama and Shibahara in the final.

Krawczyk and Schuurs qualified for the WTA Finals for the second consecutive year as a team, marking Krawczyk's third straight appearance at the Finals. However, they were eliminated in the round robin after losing all their matches. Krawczyk finished the year ranked No. 16 for the second sraight year.

=== 2024: Olympics debut, first WTA 1000 doubles title, world No. 7 ===
At the Australian Open, Krawczyk tried again with Skupski to complete the career Grand Slam. However, they lost to third seeded pair Jan Zielinski and Hsieh Su-wei, after missing a championship point.

Partnering Caroline Dolehide, she reached the final of the WTA 1000 Qatar Ladies Open but lost to Luisa Stefani and her partner Demi Schuurs.

Dolehide and Krawczyk reached the semifinals at the French Open, where they lost in three sets to eventual champions Coco Gauff and Kateřina Siniaková. In mixed doubles, Krawczyk and Skupski made it into the final at the but lost to the pair of Laura Siegemund and Édouard Roger-Vasselin.

Dolehide and Krawczyk reached the semifinals of Wimbledon, where they lost in straight sets to Gabriela Dabrowski and Erin Routliffe.

Krawczyk made her Olympics debut in Paris. She and Danielle Collins were seeded fourth in women's doubles but lost to Ukrainians Lyudmyla and Nadiia Kichenok in the second round.

Krawczyk won her first WTA 1000 doubles title when she and Dolehide defeated Dabrowski and Routliffe in the final at the Canadian Open. It was Krawcyzk's eleventh doubles title and continued her streak of winning a title every year since 2018. By winning the title, she reached a new career high ranking of No. 7.

Dolehide and Krawczyk qualified for the end-of-season WTA Finals in Riyadh, Saudi Arabia, but they were eliminated in the group stages, after losing all three of their matches. Krawczyk achieved her highest year-end finish at No. 11.

=== 2025: Third Wimbledon semifinal ===
Partnering Giuliana Olmos, Krawczyk won the doubles title at the Singapore Open, defeating Wang Xinyu and Zheng Saisai in the final.

Krawczyk and Dolehide reached the final at Charleston, but they lost to Jeļena Ostapenko and Erin Routliffe.

Partnering Olivia Gadecki, Krawczyk reached the semifinals at Wimbledon for the third time in four years. They lost to eventual champions Veronika Kudermetova and Elise Mertens, in three sets.

Krawczyk finished the year ranked No. 36, ending a streak of four consecutive WTA Finals appearances and top 20 finishes.

=== 2026: Charleston and Ningbo titles ===
Krawczyk reached the final at Adelaide with new partner Lyudmyla Kichenok, but they lost to Kateřina Siniaková and Zhang Shuai.

Partnering Caty McNally, she reached the final at Charleston for the second consecutive year, and won her second title at the tournament (after 2023), defeating Anna Bondár and Magdalena Fręch.

In October at the Ningbo Open, Krawczyk teamed with Fanny Stollár to win the title, defeating top seeds Nicole Melichar-Martinez and Cristina Bucșa in the final.

== Performance timelines ==
Key
| W | F | SF | QF | #R | RR | Q# | P# | DNQ | A | Z# | PO | G | S | B | NMS | NTI | P | NH |

(W) winner; (F) finalist; (SF) semifinalist; (QF) quarterfinalist; (#R) rounds 4, 3, 2, 1; (RR) round-robin stage; (Q#) qualification round; (P#) preliminary round; (DNQ) did not qualify; (A) absent; (Z#) Davis/Fed Cup Zonal Group (with number indication) or (PO) play-off; (G) gold, (S) silver or (B) bronze Olympic/Paralympic medal; (NMS) not a Masters tournament; (NTI) not a Tier I tournament; (P) postponed; (NH) not held; (SR) strike rate (events won / competed); (W–L) win–loss record.
To avoid confusion and double counting, these charts are updated at the conclusion of a tournament or when the player's participation has ended.

Only main-draw results in WTA Tour, Grand Slam tournaments, Fed Cup/Billie Jean King Cup and Olympic Games are included in win–loss records.

=== Doubles ===
Current through the 2026 Wuhan Open.

| Tournament | 2017 | 2018 | 2019 | 2020 | 2021 | 2022 | 2023 | 2024 | 2025 | 2026 | SR | W–L | Win% |
|---|---|---|---|---|---|---|---|---|---|---|---|---|---|
Grand Slam tournaments
| Australian Open | A | A | 3R | 2R | 3R | 3R | QF | 3R | 1R | 1R | 0 / 8 | 12–8 | 60% |
| French Open | A | A | 3R | F | 1R | 2R | 3R | SF | 1R | 1R | 0 / 8 | 14–8 | 64% |
| Wimbledon | A | Q1 | 2R | NH | 1R | SF | 2R | SF | SF | 2R | 0 / 7 | 15–7 | 68% |
| US Open | A | 2R | 1R | 1R | SF | QF | 2R | 2R | 2R | 3R | 0 / 9 | 13–9 | 59% |
| Win–Loss | 0–0 | 1–1 | 5–4 | 6–3 | 6–4 | 10–4 | 7–4 | 11–4 | 5–4 | 3–4 | 0 / 32 | 54–32 | 63% |
Year-end championships
| WTA Finals | DNQ | | | NH | RR | SF | RR | RR | DNQ | | 0 / 4 | 3–10 | 23% |
WTA 1000 tournaments
| Qatar Open | NTI | A | NTI | A | NTI | 2R | NTI | F | 1R | 1R | 0 / 4 | 5–4 | 56% |
| Dubai Championships | A | NTI | A | NTI | A | NTI | SF | 1R | 2R | QF | 0 / 4 | 5–4 | 56% |
| Indian Wells Open | A | A | 1R | NH | 2R | 2R | 2R | 2R | 1R | 2R | 0 / 7 | 5–7 | 42% |
| Miami Open | A | A | 1R | NH | 1R | 2R | 1R | 1R | 2R | 1R | 0 / 7 | 2–7 | 22% |
| Madrid Open | A | A | 1R | NH | 2R | F | 1R | QF | 1R | 1R | 0 / 7 | 7–7 | 50% |
| Italian Open | A | A | 1R | 1R | 1R | SF | SF | SF | 1R | 1R | 0 / 8 | 7–8 | 47% |
| Canadian Open | A | A | 1R | A | QF | QF | F | W | 1R | QF | 1 / 7 | 14–6 | 70% |
| Cincinnati Open | A | A | 1R | 2R | 1R | SF | QF | 2R | 1R | 1R | 0 / 8 | 6–8 | 43% |
| Wuhan Open | A | A | 2R | Not Held | | | | 2R | 1R | 1R | 0 / 4 | 1–4 | 20% |
| China Open | A | 1R | 1R | Not Held | | | 1R | 1R | 1R | 2R | 0 / 6 | 1–6 | 14% |
| Guadalajara Open | Not Held | | | | | 2R | A | Not Tier I | | | 0 / 1 | 1–1 | 50% |
Career statistics
| Tournaments | 3 | 15 | 25 | 14 | 25 | 24 | 23 | 25 | 29 | | Career total: 183 | | |
| Titles | 0 | 1 | 1 | 2 | 2 | 1 | 3 | 1 | 1 | | Career total: 12 | | |
| Finals | 0 | 2 | 2 | 3 | 4 | 2 | 5 | 3 | 3 | | Career total: 25 | | |
| Overall win-loss | 2–3 | 14–14 | 19–25 | 22–12 | 31–24 | 37–23 | 36–21 | 33–27 | 23–29 | | 12 / 183 | 220–178 | 55% |
| Win % | 40% | 50% | 43% | 65% | 56% | 62% | 63% | 55% | 44% | | Career total: 55% | | |
| Year-end ranking | 143 | 67 | 37 | 25 | 17 | 16 | 16 | 11 | 36 | | $3,173,338 | | |

=== Mixed doubles ===
| Tournament | 2019 | 2020 | 2021 | 2022 | 2023 | 2024 | 2025 | 2026 | SR | W–L | Win% |
|---|---|---|---|---|---|---|---|---|---|---|---|
| Australian Open | A | 1R | SF | 1R | SF | F | 1R | 1R | 0 / 7 | 12–7 | 63% |
| French Open | A | NH | W | QF | 1R | F | SF | QF | 1 / 6 | 14–5 | 74% |
| Wimbledon | 1R | NH | W | W | 1R | QF | 2R | QF | 2 / 7 | 15–5 | 75% |
| US Open | 2R | NH | W | 2R | A | 1R | A | A | 1 / 4 | 7–3 | 70% |
| Win–Loss | 1–2 | 0–1 | 18–1 | 8–3 | 3–3 | 10–4 | 4–3 | 4–3 | 4 / 24 | 48–20 | 71% |

== Grand Slam tournament finals ==
=== Doubles: 1 (runner-up) ===
| Result | Year | Tournament | Surface | Partner | Opponents | Score |
|---|---|---|---|---|---|---|
| Loss | 2020 | French Open | Clay | (Chile) Alexa Guarachi | (Hungary) Tímea Babos (France) Kristina Mladenovic | 4–6, 5–7 |

=== Mixed doubles: 6 (4 titles, 2 runner-ups) ===
| Result | Year | Tournament | Surface | Partner | Opponents | Score |
|---|---|---|---|---|---|---|
| Win | 2021 | French Open | Clay | (United Kingdom) Joe Salisbury | (Russia) Elena Vesnina (Russia) Aslan Karatsev | 2–6, 6–4, [10–5] |
| Win | 2021 | Wimbledon | Grass | (United Kingdom) Neal Skupski | (United Kingdom) Harriet Dart (United Kingdom) Joe Salisbury | 6–2, 7–6^{(7–1)} |
| Win | 2021 | US Open | Hard | (United Kingdom) Joe Salisbury | (Mexico) Giuliana Olmos (El Salvador) Marcelo Arévalo | 7–5, 6–2 |
| Win | 2022 | Wimbledon (2) | Grass | (United Kingdom) Neal Skupski | (Australia) Samantha Stosur (Australia) Matthew Ebden | 6–4, 6–3 |
| Loss | 2024 | Australian Open | Hard | (United Kingdom) Neal Skupski | (Chinese Taipei) Hsieh Su-wei (Poland) Jan Zieliński | 7–6^{(7–5)}, 4–6, [9–11] |
| Loss | 2024 | French Open | Clay | (United Kingdom) Neal Skupski | (France) Édouard Roger-Vasselin (Germany) Laura Siegemund | 4–6, 5–7 |

== Other significant finals ==
=== WTA 1000 tournaments ===
==== Doubles: 4 (1 title, 3 runner-ups) ====
| Result | Year | Tournament | Surface | Partner | Opponents | Score |
|---|---|---|---|---|---|---|
| Loss | 2022 | Madrid Open | Clay | (Netherlands) Demi Schuurs | (Canada) Gabriela Dabrowski (Mexico) Giuliana Olmos | 6–7^{(1–7)}, 7–5, [7–10] |
| Loss | 2023 | Canadian Open | Hard | (Netherlands) Demi Schuurs | (Japan) Shuko Aoyama (Japan) Ena Shibahara | 4–6, 6–4, [11–13] |
| Loss | 2024 | Qatar Ladies Open | Hard | (United States) Caroline Dolehide | (Netherlands) Demi Schuurs (Brazil) Luisa Stefani | 4–6, 2–6 |
| Win | 2024 | Canadian Open | Hard | (United States) Caroline Dolehide | (Canada) Gabriela Dabrowski (New Zealand) Erin Routliffe | 7–6^{(7–2)}, 3–6, [10–7] |

== WTA Tour finals ==
=== Doubles: 27 (14 titles, 13 runner-ups) ===
| Legend Grand Slam (0–1) WTA 1000 (1–3) WTA 500 (7–4) International / WTA 250 (6–5) | Finals by surface Hard (5–8) Clay (7–5) Grass (2–0) |

| Result | W–L | Date | Tournament | Tier | Surface | Partner | Opponents | Score |
|---|---|---|---|---|---|---|---|---|
| Loss | 0–1 | Apr 2018 | Monterrey Open, Mexico | International | Hard | (Mexico) Giuliana Olmos | (United Kingdom) Naomi Broady (Spain) Sara Sorribes Tormo | 6–3, 4–6, [8–10] |
| Win | 1–1 | Jul 2018 | Ladies Open Gstaad, Switzerland | International | Clay | (Chile) Alexa Guarachi | (Spain) Lara Arruabarrena (Switzerland) Timea Bacsinszky | 4–6, 6–4, [10–6] |
| Loss | 1–2 | Mar 2019 | Abierto Mexicano, Mexico | International | Hard | (Mexico) Giuliana Olmos | (Belarus) Victoria Azarenka (China) Zheng Saisai | 1–6, 2–6 |
| Win | 2–2 | Jun 2019 | Nottingham Open, United Kingdom | International | Grass | (Mexico) Giuliana Olmos | (Australia) Ellen Perez (Australia) Arina Rodionova | 7–6^{(5)}, 7–5 |
| Win | 3–2 | Feb 2020 | Abierto Mexicano, Mexico | International | Hard | (Mexico) Giuliana Olmos | (Ukraine) Kateryna Bondarenko (Canada) Sharon Fichman | 6–3, 7–6^{(7–5)} |
| Win | 4–2 | Sep 2020 | İstanbul Cup, Turkey | International | Clay | (Chile) Alexa Guarachi | (Australia) Ellen Perez (Australia) Storm Sanders | 6–1, 6–3 |
| Loss | 4–3 | Oct 2020 | French Open, France | Grand Slam | Clay | (Chile) Alexa Guarachi | (Hungary) Tímea Babos (France) Kristina Mladenovic | 4–6, 5–7 |
| Win | 5–3 | Feb 2021 | Adelaide International, Australia | WTA 500 | Hard | (Chile) Alexa Guarachi | (United States) Hayley Carter (Brazil) Luisa Stefani | 6–7^{(4)}, 6–4, [10–3] |
| Loss | 5–4 | Mar 2021 | Abierto Zapopan, Mexico | WTA 250 | Hard | (Mexico) Giuliana Olmos | (Australia) Ellen Perez (Australia) Astra Sharma | 4–6, 4–6 |
| Loss | 5–5 | Apr 2021 | Stuttgart Grand Prix, Germany | WTA 500 | Clay (i) | (United States) Bethanie Mattek-Sands | (Australia) Ashleigh Barty (United States) Jennifer Brady | 4–6, 7–5, [5–10] |
| Win | 6–5 | May 2021 | Internationaux de Strasbourg, France | WTA 250 | Clay | (Chile) Alexa Guarachi | (Japan) Makoto Ninomiya (China) Yang Zhaoxuan | 6–2, 6–3 |
| Win | 7–5 | Apr 2022 | Stuttgart Grand Prix, Germany | WTA 500 | Clay (i) | (Netherlands) Demi Schuurs | (United States) Coco Gauff (China) Zhang Shuai | 6–3, 6–4 |
| Loss | 7–6 | May 2022 | Madrid Open, Spain | WTA 1000 | Clay | (Netherlands) Demi Schuurs | (Canada) Gabriela Dabrowski (Mexico) Giuliana Olmos | 6–7^{(1)}, 7–5, [7–10] |
| Win | 8–6 | Apr 2023 | Charleston Open, United States | WTA 500 | Clay (green) | (United States) Danielle Collins | (Mexico) Giuliana Olmos (Japan) Ena Shibahara | 0–6, 6–4, [14–12] |
| Win | 9–6 | Apr 2023 | Stuttgart Grand Prix, Germany (2) | WTA 500 | Clay (i) | (Netherlands) Demi Schuurs | (United States) Nicole Melichar-Martinez (Mexico) Giuliana Olmos | 6–4, 6–1 |
| Loss | 9–7 | May 2023 | Internationaux de Strasbourg, France | WTA 250 | Clay | (Mexico) Giuliana Olmos | (China) Xu Yifan (China) Yang Zhaoxuan | 3–6, 2–6 |
| Win | 10–7 | Jun 2023 | Eastbourne International, UK | WTA 500 | Grass | (Netherlands) Demi Schuurs | (United States) Nicole Melichar-Martinez (Australia) Ellen Perez | 6–2, 6–4 |
| Loss | 10–8 | Aug 2023 | Canadian Open, Canada | WTA 1000 | Hard | (Netherlands) Demi Schuurs | (Japan) Shuko Aoyama (Japan) Ena Shibahara | 4–6, 6–4, [11–13] |
| Loss | 10–9 | Feb 2024 | Qatar Ladies Open | WTA 1000 | Hard | (United States) Caroline Dolehide | (Netherlands) Demi Schuurs (Brazil) Luisa Stefani | 4–6, 2–6 |
| Loss | 10–10 | Mar 2024 | San Diego Open, United States | WTA 500 | Hard | (United States) Jessica Pegula | (United States) Nicole Melichar-Martinez (Australia) Ellen Perez | 1–6, 2–6 |
| Win | 11–10 | Aug 2024 | Canadian Open, Canada | WTA 1000 | Hard | (United States) Caroline Dolehide | (Canada) Gabriela Dabrowski (New Zealand) Erin Routliffe | 7–6^{(7–2)}, 3–6, [10–7] |
| Win | 12–10 | Feb 2025 | Singapore Open, Singapore | WTA 250 | Hard | (Mexico) Giuliana Olmos | (China) Wang Xinyu (China) Zheng Saisai | 7–5, 6–0 |
| Loss | 12–11 | Mar 2025 | Charleston Open, US | WTA 500 | Clay (green) | (United States) Caroline Dolehide | (Latvia) Jeļena Ostapenko (New Zealand) Erin Routliffe | 4–6, 2–6 |
| Loss | 12–12 | Oct 2025 | Japan Women's Open, Japan | WTA 250 | Hard | (Australia) Storm Hunter | (France) Kristina Mladenovic (United States) Taylor Townsend | 4–6, 6–2, [5–10] |
| Loss | 12–13 | Jan 2026 | Adelaide Interntational, Australia | WTA 500 | Hard | (Ukraine) Lyudmyla Kichenok | (Czech Republic) Kateřina Siniaková (China) Zhang Shuai | 1–6, 4–6 |
| Win | 13–13 | Mar 2026 | Charleston Open, US (2) | WTA 500 | Clay (green) | (United States) Caty McNally | (Hungary) Anna Bondár (Poland) Magdalena Fręch | 6–3, 6–2 |
| Win | 14–13 | Oct 2026 | Ningbo Open, China | WTA 500 | Hard | (Hungary) Fanny Stollár | (United States) Nicole Melichar-Martinez (Spain) Cristina Bucșa | 7–6^{(7–5)}, 5–7, [10–6] |

== WTA 125 finals ==
=== Doubles: 2 (2 runner-ups) ===
| Result | W–L | Date | Tournament | Surface | Partner | Opponents | Score |
|---|---|---|---|---|---|---|---|
| Loss | 0–1 | Nov 2018 | Houston Challenger, US | Hard | (Mexico) Giuliana Olmos | (United States) Maegan Manasse (United States) Jessica Pegula | 6–1, 4–6, [8–10] |
| Loss | 0–2 | May 2026 | Clarins Open, France | Clay | (Ukraine) Lyudmyla Kichenok | (Japan) Shuko Aoyama (Chinese Taipei) Liang En-shuo | 6–7^{(5–7)}, 2–6 |

== ITF Circuit finals ==
Legend
$100,000 tournaments (1–1)
$80,000 tournaments (0–1)
$60,000 tournaments (1–1)
$25,000 tournaments (2–1)
$15,000 tournaments (2–1)

=== Doubles: 11 (6 titles, 5 runner-ups) ===
| Result | W–L | Date | Tournament | Tier | Surface | Partner | Opponents | Score |
|---|---|---|---|---|---|---|---|---|
| Loss | 0–1 | Sep 2016 | ITF Ponta Delgada, Portugal | 10,000 | Clay | (Russia) Elina Vikhryanova | (Germany) Katharina Hering (Cambodia) Andrea Ka | 3–6, 3–6 |
| Win | 1–1 | Jan 2017 | ITF Fort-de-France, Guadeloupe | 15,000 | Hard | (Mexico) Giuliana Olmos | (France) Sara Cakarevic (France) Emmanuelle Salas | 6–3, 6–2 |
| Win | 2–1 | Jan 2017 | ITF Saint Martin, Guadeloupe | 15,000 | Hard | (Mexico) Giuliana Olmos | (Netherlands) Chayenne Ewijk (Netherlands) Rosalie van der Hoek | 6–1, 6–1 |
| Win | 3–1 | Apr 2017 | ITF Irapuato, Mexico | 25,000 | Hard | (Mexico) Giuliana Olmos | (United States) Ronit Yurovsky (Mexico) Marcela Zacarías | 6–1, 6–0 |
| Win | 4–1 | May 2017 | ITF Incheon, South Korea | 25,000 | Hard | (Mexico) Giuliana Olmos | (South Korea) Choi Ji-hee (South Korea) Kim Na-ri | 6–3, 2–6, [10–8] |
| Win | 5–1 | Jul 2017 | Sacramento Challenger, US | 60,000 | Hard | (Mexico) Giuliana Olmos | (Serbia) Jovana Jakšić (Belarus) Vera Lapko | 6–1, 6–2 |
| Loss | 5–2 | Aug 2017 | Vancouver Open, Canada | 100,000 | Hard | (Mexico) Giuliana Olmos | (Australia) Jessica Moore (United Kingdom) Jocelyn Rae | 1–6, 5–7 |
| Loss | 5–3 | Mar 2018 | ITF Irapuato, Mexico | 25,000 | Hard | (Mexico) Giuliana Olmos | (Chile) Alexa Guarachi (New Zealand) Erin Routliffe | 6–4, 2–6, [6–10] |
| Win | 6–3 | Aug 2018 | Vancouver Open, Canada | 100,000 | Hard | (Mexico) Giuliana Olmos | (Ukraine) Kateryna Kozlova (Netherlands) Arantxa Rus | 6–2, 7–5 |
| Loss | 6–4 | Nov 2018 | Tyler Pro Challenge, US | 80,000 | Hard | (Mexico) Giuliana Olmos | (United States) Nicole Gibbs (United States) Asia Muhammad | 6–3, 3–6, [12–14] |
| Loss | 6–5 | Jan 2020 | Burnie International, Australia | 60,000 | Hard | (United States) Asia Muhammad | (New Zealand) Ellen Perez (Australia) Storm Sanders | 3–6, 2–6 |

== Grand Slam seedings ==
The tournaments won by Krawczyk are in boldface, and advances into finals by Krawczyk are in italics.

=== Women's doubles ===
Not seeded at all, or not seeded inside the top 10 Seeded 10–4 Seeded No. 3 Seeded No. 2 Seeded No. 1

| Year | Australian Open | French Open | Wimbledon | US Open |
|---|---|---|---|---|
| 2018 | did not play | did not play | did not qualify | not seeded |
| 2019 | not seeded | not seeded | not seeded | not seeded |
| 2020 | not seeded | 14th (1) | tournament cancelled | not seeded |
| 2021 | 9th | 5th | 6th | 7th |
| 2022 | not seeded | 5th | not seeded | 6th |
| 2023 | 6th | 5th | 5th | 4th |
| 2024 | 6th | 8th | | |

=== Mixed doubles ===
Not seeded at all, or not seeded inside the top 10 Seeded 10–4 Seeded No. 3 Seeded No. 2 Seeded No. 1

| Year | Australian Open | French Open | Wimbledon | US Open |
|---|---|---|---|---|
| 2019 | did not play | did not play | not seeded | not seeded |
| 2020 | not seeded | tournament cancelled | | |
| 2021 | not seeded | **not seeded (1)** | **7th (2)** | **2nd (3)** |
| 2022 | 1st | 4th | **2nd (4)** | 1st |
| 2023 | 3rd | 2nd | 2nd | ~~2nd (Note: Krawczyk was seeded second but withdrew right before the tournament.)~~ |
| 2024 | 2nd (1) | 4th (2) | | |

== Career earnings ==
| Year | Earnings (US$) | Money list rank |
|---|---|---|
| 2017 | 12,521 | 525 |
| 2018 | 47,649 | 287 |
| 2019 | 149,985 | 189 |
| 2020 | 176,005 | 129 |
| 2021 | 479,889 | 88 |
| 2022 | 571,455 | 72 |
| 2023 | 407,414 | 120 |
| 2024 | 156,412 | 116 |
| 2025 | 331,655 | 163 |
| Career | 2,941,363 | 267 |
