= Oracle Challenger Series – Houston =

- 2019 Oracle Challenger Series – Houston

Defunct tennis tournament
- Event name: Oracle Challenger Series – Houston
- Founded: 2018
- Location: Houston, United States
- Venue: Rice University George R. Brown Tennis Complex
- Surface: Hard
- Website: oraclechallengerseries.com

Current champions (2019)
- Men's singles: (United States) Marcos Giron
- Women's singles: (Belgium) Kirsten Flipkens
- Men's doubles: (Israel) Jonathan Erlich (Mexico) Santiago González
- Women's doubles: (Australia) Ellen Perez (Brazil) Luisa Stefani
ATP Tour
- Category: ATP Challenger Tour
- Draw: 48S / 4Q / 16D
- Prize money: $162,480
WTA Tour
- Category: WTA 125K series
- Draw: 48S / 4Q / 16D
- Prize money: $162,480

The Oracle Challenger Series – Houston is a professional tennis tournament played on hard courts. It is currently part of the ATP Challenger Tour and the Women's Tennis Association (WTA) 125K series. It is held annually in Houston, United States since 2018. The ATP Challenger Tour returned to Houston, Texas for the first time since 2001, with the inaugural Oracle Challenger Series Houston making its debut in November. Held on the campus of Rice University, at the new $9 million George R. Brown Tennis Complex. Houston is will become one of just two U.S. cities to host tournaments on both the ATP World Tour and ATP Challenger Tour, with the ATP World tour tournament being the U.S. Men's Clay Court Championships. The Oracle Challenger Series – Houston is the second stop for the Oracle Challenger Series calendar. The winner of the Oracle Challenger Series earns a wild card into Indian Wells Masters.

== Past finals ==
=== Men's singles ===
Year	Champion	Runner-up	Score
2020	Cancelled due to the COVID-19 pandemic		
2019	(United States) Marcos Giron	(Croatia) Ivo Karlović	7–5, 6–7^{(5–7)}, 7–6^{(11–9)}
2018	(United States) Bradley Klahn	(United States) Roy Smith	7–6^{(7–4)}, 7–6^{(7–4)}

=== Women's singles ===
Year	Champion	Runner-up	Score
2020	Cancelled due to the COVID-19 pandemic		
2019	(Belgium) Kirsten Flipkens	(United States) CoCo Vandeweghe	7–6^{(7–4)}, 6–4
2018	(China) Peng Shuai	(United States) Lauren Davis	1–6, 7–5, 6–4

=== Men's doubles ===
Year	Champions	Runners-up	Score
2020	Cancelled due to the COVID-19 pandemic		
2019	(Israel) Jonathan Erlich (Mexico) Santiago González	(Uruguay) Ariel Behar (Ecuador) Gonzalo Escobar	6–3, 7–6^{(7–4)}
2018	(United States) Austin Krajicek (United States) Nicholas Monroe	(El Salvador) Marcelo Arévalo (United States) James Cerretani	4–6, 7–6^{(7–3)}, [10–5]

=== Women's doubles ===
Year	Champions	Runners-up	Score
2020	Cancelled due to the COVID-19 pandemic		
2019	(Australia) Ellen Perez (Brazil) Luisa Stefani	(Canada) Sharon Fichman (Japan) Ena Shibahara	1–6, 6–4, [10–5]
2018	(United States) Maegan Manasse (United States) Jessica Pegula	(United States) Desirae Krawczyk (Mexico) Giuliana Olmos	1–6, 6–4, [10–8]
