= 2018 WTA 125K series =

Details
- Duration: January 21, 2018 – November 18, 2018
- Edition: 7th
- Tournaments: 10

Achievements (singles)
- Most titles: (Thailand) Luksika Kumkhum (2)
- Most finals: (Russia) Irina Khromacheva (Thailand) Luksika Kumkhum (China) Zheng Saisai (2)

The WTA 125K series is the secondary professional tennis circuit organised by the Women's Tennis Association. The 2018 WTA 125K series calendar consisted of ten tournaments, each with a total prize fund of $125,000 each except the Oracle Challenger Series that offer $150,000 in prize money. After 2017, Dalian Women's Tennis Open and Hawaii Tennis Open were scrapped while Hua Hin Championships was replaced by Thailand Open, an international WTA event to take place at the same venue, beginning February 2019. 5 new tournaments were introduced in Newport Beach, Indian Wells, Chicago, Houston and Anning which was earlier an ITF event.

== Schedule ==
Week of	Tournament	Champions	Runners-up	Semifinalists	Quarterfinalists
January 21	Oracle Challenger Series – Newport Beach; Newport Beach, United States $150,000 – hard – 32S/24Q/16D; Singles – Doubles	(United States) Danielle Collins; 2–6, 6–4, 6–3	(Russia) Sofya Zhuk	(Croatia) Ajla Tomljanović (Japan) Mayo Hibi	(South Korea) Jang Su-jeong (United States) Nicole Gibbs (Switzerland) Jil Teichmann (United States) Sachia Vickery
January 21	Oracle Challenger Series – Newport Beach; Newport Beach, United States $150,000 – hard – 32S/24Q/16D; Singles – Doubles	(Japan) Misaki Doi (Switzerland) Jil Teichmann; 7–6^{(7–4)}, 1–6, [10–8]	(United States) Jamie Loeb (Sweden) Rebecca Peterson	(Croatia) Ajla Tomljanović (Japan) Mayo Hibi	(South Korea) Jang Su-jeong (United States) Nicole Gibbs (Switzerland) Jil Teichmann (United States) Sachia Vickery
February 26	Oracle Challenger Series – Indian Wells; Indian Wells, United States $150,000 – hard – 32S/24Q/16D; Singles – Doubles	(Italy) Sara Errani; 6–4, 6–2	(Ukraine) Kateryna Bondarenko	(United States) Amanda Anisimova (Australia) Ajla Tomljanović	(United States) Danielle Collins (United States) Caroline Dolehide (Belgium) Yanina Wickmayer (Switzerland) Viktorija Golubic
February 26	Oracle Challenger Series – Indian Wells; Indian Wells, United States $150,000 – hard – 32S/24Q/16D; Singles – Doubles	(United States) Taylor Townsend (Belgium) Yanina Wickmayer; 6–4, 6–4	(United States) Jennifer Brady (United States) Vania King	(United States) Amanda Anisimova (Australia) Ajla Tomljanović	(United States) Danielle Collins (United States) Caroline Dolehide (Belgium) Yanina Wickmayer (Switzerland) Viktorija Golubic
April 16	Zhengzhou Women's Tennis Open; Zhengzhou, China $125,000 – hard – 32S/16Q/16D; Singles – Doubles	(China) Zheng Saisai; 5–7, 6–2, 6–1	(China) Wang Yafan	(Belgium) Yanina Wickmayer (China) Han Xinyun	(Japan) Mai Minokoshi (China) Zhu Lin (United States) Danielle Lao (China) Lu Jiajing
April 16	Zhengzhou Women's Tennis Open; Zhengzhou, China $125,000 – hard – 32S/16Q/16D; Singles – Doubles	(China) Duan Yingying (China) Wang Yafan; 7–6^{(7–5)}, 6–3	(United Kingdom) Naomi Broady (Belgium) Yanina Wickmayer	(Belgium) Yanina Wickmayer (China) Han Xinyun	(Japan) Mai Minokoshi (China) Zhu Lin (United States) Danielle Lao (China) Lu Jiajing
April 30	Kunming Open; Anning, China $125,000 – clay – 32S/16Q/16D; Singles – Doubles	(Russia) Irina Khromacheva; 3–6, 6–4, 7–6^{(7–5)}	(China) Zheng Saisai	(China) Peng Shuai (China) Han Xinyun	(Bulgaria) Elitsa Kostova (France) Amandine Hesse (Belgium) Yanina Wickmayer (China) Wang Yafan
April 30	Kunming Open; Anning, China $125,000 – clay – 32S/16Q/16D; Singles – Doubles	(Slovenia) Dalila Jakupović (Russia) Irina Khromacheva; 6–1, 6–1	(China) Guo Hanyu (China) Sun Xuliu	(China) Peng Shuai (China) Han Xinyun	(Bulgaria) Elitsa Kostova (France) Amandine Hesse (Belgium) Yanina Wickmayer (China) Wang Yafan
June 5	Croatian Bol Open; Bol, Croatia $125,000 – clay – 32S/16D; Singles – Doubles	(Slovenia) Tamara Zidanšek; 6–1, 6–3	(Poland) Magda Linette	(Croatia) Tena Lukas (Italy) Sara Errani	(Colombia) Mariana Duque Mariño (Slovakia) Anna Karolína Schmiedlová (Spain) Sara Sorribes Tormo (Switzerland) Viktorija Golubic
June 5	Croatian Bol Open; Bol, Croatia $125,000 – clay – 32S/16D; Singles – Doubles	(Colombia) Mariana Duque Mariño (China) Wang Yafan; 6–3, 7–5	(Spain) Sílvia Soler Espinosa (Czech Republic) Barbora Štefková	(Croatia) Tena Lukas (Italy) Sara Errani	(Colombia) Mariana Duque Mariño (Slovakia) Anna Karolína Schmiedlová (Spain) Sara Sorribes Tormo (Switzerland) Viktorija Golubic
September 3	Oracle Challenger Series – Chicago; Chicago, United States $150,000 – hard – 32S/24Q/16D; Singles – Doubles	(Croatia) Petra Martić; 6–4, 6–1	(Germany) Mona Barthel	(United States) Sachia Vickery (Germany) Tatjana Maria	(Russia) Anna Blinkova (Ukraine) Dayana Yastremska (Canada) Françoise Abanda (United States) Varvara Lepchenko
September 3	Oracle Challenger Series – Chicago; Chicago, United States $150,000 – hard – 32S/24Q/16D; Singles – Doubles	(Germany) Mona Barthel (Czech Republic) Kristýna Plíšková; 6–3, 6–2	(United States) Asia Muhammad (United States) Maria Sanchez	(United States) Sachia Vickery (Germany) Tatjana Maria	(Russia) Anna Blinkova (Ukraine) Dayana Yastremska (Canada) Françoise Abanda (United States) Varvara Lepchenko
October 29	L&T Mumbai Open; Mumbai, India $125,000 – hard – 32S/16Q/16D; Singles – Doubles	(Thailand) Luksika Kumkhum; 1–6, 6–2, 6–3	(Russia) Irina Khromacheva	(Russia) Margarita Gasparyan (Slovenia) Dalila Jakupović	(China) Zheng Saisai (Montenegro) Danka Kovinić (Greece) Valentini Grammatikopoulou (China) Lu Jiajing
October 29	L&T Mumbai Open; Mumbai, India $125,000 – hard – 32S/16Q/16D; Singles – Doubles	(Russia) Natela Dzalamidze (Russia) Veronika Kudermetova; 6–4, 7–6^{(7–4)}	(Netherlands) Bibiane Schoofs (Czech Republic) Barbora Štefková	(Russia) Margarita Gasparyan (Slovenia) Dalila Jakupović	(China) Zheng Saisai (Montenegro) Danka Kovinić (Greece) Valentini Grammatikopoulou (China) Lu Jiajing
November 5	Open de Limoges; Limoges, France $125,000 – hard (indoor) – 32S/16Q/8D; Singles – Doubles	(Russia) Ekaterina Alexandrova; 6–2, 6–2	(Russia) Evgeniya Rodina	(Russia) Margarita Gasparyan (Russia) Vera Zvonareva	(Russia) Anna Blinkova (Romania) Ana Bogdan (France) Pauline Parmentier (Germany) Tatjana Maria
November 5	Open de Limoges; Limoges, France $125,000 – hard (indoor) – 32S/16Q/8D; Singles – Doubles	(Russia) Veronika Kudermetova (Kazakhstan) Galina Voskoboeva; 7–5, 6–4	(Switzerland) Timea Bacsinszky (Russia) Vera Zvonareva	(Russia) Margarita Gasparyan (Russia) Vera Zvonareva	(Russia) Anna Blinkova (Romania) Ana Bogdan (France) Pauline Parmentier (Germany) Tatjana Maria
November 12	OEC Taipei WTA Challenger; Taipei, Taiwan $125,000 – carpet (indoor) – 32S/16Q/16D; Singles – Doubles	(Thailand) Luksika Kumkhum; 6–1, 6–3	(Germany) Sabine Lisicki	(Russia) Vitalia Diatchenko (Netherlands) Bibiane Schoofs	(Chinese Taipei) Liang En-shuo (China) Zhu Lin (Czech Republic) Tereza Martincová (Japan) Nao Hibino
November 12	OEC Taipei WTA Challenger; Taipei, Taiwan $125,000 – carpet (indoor) – 32S/16Q/16D; Singles – Doubles	(India) Ankita Raina (India) Karman Thandi; 6–3, 5–7, [12–12], ret.	(Russia) Olga Doroshina (Russia) Natela Dzalamidze	(Russia) Vitalia Diatchenko (Netherlands) Bibiane Schoofs	(Chinese Taipei) Liang En-shuo (China) Zhu Lin (Czech Republic) Tereza Martincová (Japan) Nao Hibino
November 12	Oracle Challenger Series – Houston; Houston, United States $150,000 – hard – 32S/24Q/16D; Singles – Doubles	(China) Peng Shuai; 1–6, 7–5, 6–4	(United States) Lauren Davis	(United States) Jessica Pegula (Russia) Sofya Zhuk	(United States) Whitney Osuigwe (Hungary) Fanny Stollár (United Kingdom) Heather Watson (Canada) Katherine Sebov
November 12	Oracle Challenger Series – Houston; Houston, United States $150,000 – hard – 32S/24Q/16D; Singles – Doubles	(United States) Maegan Manasse (United States) Jessica Pegula; 1–6, 6–4, [10–8]	(United States) Desirae Krawczyk (Mexico) Giuliana Olmos	(United States) Jessica Pegula (Russia) Sofya Zhuk	(United States) Whitney Osuigwe (Hungary) Fanny Stollár (United Kingdom) Heather Watson (Canada) Katherine Sebov

== Statistical information ==
These tables present the number of singles (S) and doubles (D) titles won by each player and each nation during the season. The players/nations are sorted by: 1) total number of titles (a doubles title won by two players representing the same nation counts as only one win for the nation); 2) a singles > doubles hierarchy; 3) alphabetical order (by family names for players).

To avoid confusion and double counting, these tables should be updated only after an event is completed.

=== Titles won by player ===
Total	Player	S	D	S	D
2	Luksika Kumkhum (THA)	● ●		2	0
2	Irina Khromacheva (RUS)	●	●	1	1
2	Veronika Kudermetova (RUS)		● ●	0	2
2	Wang Yafan (CHN)		● ●	0	2
1	Ekaterina Alexandrova (RUS)	●		1	0
1	Danielle Collins (USA)	●		1	0
1	Sara Errani (ITA)	●		1	0
1	Petra Martić (CRO)	●		1	0
1	Peng Shuai (CHN)	●		1	0
1	Zheng Saisai (CHN)	●		1	0
1	Tamara Zidanšek (SLO)	●		1	0
1	Mona Barthel (GER)		●	0	1
1	Misaki Doi (JPN)		●	0	1
1	Duan Yingying (CHN)		●	0	1
1	Mariana Duque Mariño (COL)		●	0	1
1	Natela Dzalamidze (RUS)		●	0	1
1	Dalila Jakupović (SLO)		●	0	1
1	Maegan Manasse (USA)		●	0	1
1	Jessica Pegula (USA)		●	0	1
1	Kristýna Plíšková (CZE)		●	0	1
1	Ankita Raina (IND)		●	0	1
1	Jil Teichmann (SUI)		●	0	1
1	Karman Thandi (IND)		●	0	1
1	Taylor Townsend (USA)		●	0	1
1	Galina Voskoboeva (KAZ)		●	0	1
1	Yanina Wickmayer (BEL)		●	0	1

=== Titles won by nation ===
Total	Nation	S	D
5	Russia (RUS)	2	3
4	China (CHN)	2	2
3	United States (USA)	1	2
2	Thailand (THA)	2	0
2	Slovenia (SLO)	1	1
1	Croatia (CRO)	1	0
1	Italy (ITA)	1	0
1	Belgium (BEL)	0	1
1	Colombia (COL)	0	1
1	Czech Republic (CZE)	0	1
1	Germany (GER)	0	1
1	India (IND)	0	1
1	Japan (JPN)	0	1
1	Kazakhstan (KAZ)	0	1
1	Switzerland (SUI)	0	1

== Points distribution ==
Event	W	F	SF	QF	R16	R32	Q	Q2	Q1
Singles	160	95	57	29	15	1	6	4	1
Doubles (16D)	160	95	57	29	1	—	—	—	—
