= 2018 Mumbai Open =

- Date: 29 October – 3 November
- Edition: 2nd
- Draw: 32S / 16D / 16Q
- Prize money: $125,000
- Surface: Hard
- Location: Mumbai, India
- Venue: Cricket Club of India

Champions

Singles
- (Thailand) Luksika Kumkhum

Doubles
- (Russia) Natela Dzalamidze / (Russia) Veronika Kudermetova
- Mumbai Open

The 2018 L&T Mumbai Open was a professional tennis tournament played on outdoor hard courts. It was the second edition of the tournament. It was part of the 2018 WTA 125K series. It took place from 29 October to 3 November 2018 at the Cricket Club of India.

== WTA singles main-draw entrants ==
=== Seeds ===
Country	Player	Rank^{1}	Seed
CHN	Zheng Saisai	47	1
SLO	Dalila Jakupović	76	2
USA	Sachia Vickery	95	3
SRB	Olga Danilović	99	4
THA	Luksika Kumkhum	102	5
RUS	Margarita Gasparyan	109	6
CHN	Zhu Lin	115	7
JPN	Nao Hibino	116	8

- ^{1} Rankings are as of 22 October 2018.

=== Other entrants ===
The following players received wildcards into the singles main draw:

- (India) Rutuja Bhosale
- (Germany) Sabine Lisicki
- (Hong Kong) Ng Kwan-yau
- (India) Karman Thandi

The following players received entry from the qualifying draw:

- (Japan) Hiroko Kuwata
- (Czech Republic) Tereza Martincová
- (Poland) Urszula Radwańska
- (India) Pranjala Yadlapalli

The following players received entry into the main draw as a lucky loser:

- (Georgia (country)) Sofia Shapatava

=== Withdrawals ===
- (Russia) Anna Kalinskaya → replaced by (China) Lu Jiajing
- (Russia) Vera Zvonareva → replaced by (Israel) Deniz Khazaniuk
- (Israel) Julia Glushko → replaced by (Georgia (country)) Sofia Shapatava

== WTA doubles main-draw entrants ==
=== Seeds ===
Country	Player	Country	Player	Rank^{1}	Seed
SLO	Dalila Jakupović	RUS	Irina Khromacheva	94	1
JPN	Nao Hibino	GEO	Oksana Kalashnikova	144	2
RUS	Natela Dzalamidze	RUS	Veronika Kudermetova	179	3
NED	Bibiane Schoofs	CZE	Barbora Štefková	212	4

- ^{1} Rankings as of 22 October 2018.

=== Other entrants ===
The following team received wildcard into the doubles main draw:

- (India) Mahak Jain / (India) Mihika Yadav

== Champions ==
=== Singles ===
- (Thailand) Luksika Kumkhum def. (Russia) Irina Khromacheva, 1–6, 6–2, 6–3

=== Doubles ===
- (Russia) Natela Dzalamidze / (Russia) Veronika Kudermetova def. (Netherlands) Bibiane Schoofs / (Czech Republic) Barbora Štefková, 6–4, 7–6^{(7–4)}
