= 2018 OEC Taipei WTA Challenger =

- Date: 12–18 November
- Edition: 11th
- Category: WTA 125K series
- Prize money: $125,000
- Surface: Carpet (indoor)
- Location: Taipei, Taiwan

Champions

Singles
- (Thailand) Luksika Kumkhum

Doubles
- (India) Ankita Raina / (India) Karman Thandi
- OEC Taipei WTA Challenger

The 2018 OEC Taipei WTA Challenger was a professional tennis tournament played on indoor carpet courts. It was the 11th edition of the tournament and part of the 2018 WTA 125K series, offering a total of $125,000 in prize money. It took place in Taipei, Taiwan, on 12–18 November 2018.

== Singles main draw entrants ==
=== Seeds ===
Country	Player	Rank^{1}	Seed
~~CHN~~	~~Zheng Saisai~~	~~46~~	~~1~~
THA	Luksika Kumkhum	80	2
~~RUS~~	~~Margarita Gasparyan~~	~~105~~	~~3~~
CHN	Zhu Lin	114	4
JPN	Nao Hibino	119	5
RUS	Vitalia Diatchenko	120	6
UZB	Sabina Sharipova	122	7
JPN	Misaki Doi	139	8

- ^{1} Rankings as of 5 November 2018.

=== Other entrants ===
The following player received wildcards into the singles main draw:

- (Chinese Taipei) Joanna Garland
- (Chinese Taipei) Liang En-shuo
- (Germany) Sabine Lisicki
- (Hong Kong) Zhang Ling
- ~~(China) Zheng Saisai~~

The following players received entry from the qualifying draw:

- (South Korea) Jang Su-jeong
- (Czech Republic) Tereza Martincová
- (Romania) Elena-Gabriela Ruse
- (China) Zhang Yuxuan

The following player received entry as lucky losers:

- (Australia) Lizette Cabrera
- (Hong Kong) Ng Kwan-yau

=== Withdrawals ===
- (Slovakia) Jana Čepelová → replaced by (Canada) Carol Zhao
- (Russia) Margarita Gasparyan → replaced by (Australia) Lizette Cabrera
- (Georgia (country)) Ekaterine Gorgodze → replaced by (China) Xun Fangying
- (Russia) Evgeniya Rodina → replaced by (Montenegro) Danka Kovinić
- (United Kingdom) Katie Swan → replaced by (India) Ankita Raina
- (United States) Sachia Vickery → replaced by (Austria) Barbara Haas
- (China) Zheng Saisai → replaced by (Hong Kong) Ng Kwan-yau

== Doubles entrants ==
=== Seeds ===
Country	Player	Country	Player	Rank^{1}	Seed
JPN	Nao Hibino	GEO	Oksana Kalashnikova	144	1
CHN	Han Xinyun	THA	Luksika Kumkhum	178	2
JPN	Misaki Doi	MNE	Danka Kovinić	221	3
RUS	Olga Doroshina	RUS	Natela Dzalamidze	267	4

- ^{1} Rankings as of 5 November 2018.

=== Other entrants ===
The following pair received a wildcard into the doubles main draw:

- (Chinese Taipei) Lee Ya-hsuan / (Chinese Taipei) Liang En-shuo

== Champions ==
=== Singles ===
- (Thailand) Luksika Kumkhum def. (Germany) Sabine Lisicki 6–1, 6–3

=== Doubles ===
- * (India) Ankita Raina / (India) Karman Thandi def. (Russia) Olga Doroshina / (Russia) Natela Dzalamidze, 6–3, 5–7, [12–12], ret.
