= 2018 Mumbai Open – Singles =

Singles
- 2018 Mumbai Open

Final
- Champion: (Thailand) Luksika Kumkhum
- Runner-up: (Russia) Irina Khromacheva
- Score: 1–6, 6–2, 6–3

Events
Singles	Doubles
← 2017 ·	Mumbai Open	· 2024 →

Luksika Kumkhum won her first WTA 125 title, defeating Irina Khromacheva in the final, 1–6, 6–2, 6–3.

Aryna Sabalenka was the defending champion, but qualified for and competed at the 2018 WTA Elite Trophy.

== Seeds ==
1. (China) Zheng Saisai (quarterfinals)
2. (Slovenia) Dalila Jakupović (semifinals)
3. (United States) Sachia Vickery (first round, retired)
4. (Serbia) Olga Danilović (first round)
5. (Thailand) Luksika Kumkhum (champion)
6. (Russia) Margarita Gasparyan (semifinals)
7. (China) Zhu Lin (first round)
8. (Japan) Nao Hibino (second round)

== Draw ==
=== Key ===
- Q = Qualifier
- WC = Wild card
- LL = Lucky loser
- Alt = Alternate
- SE = Special exempt
- PR = Protected ranking
- ITF = ITF entry
- JE = Junior exempt
- w/o = Walkover
- r = Retired
- d = Defaulted
- SR = Special ranking

=== Finals ===
Semifinals
5	(Thailand) Luksika Kumkhum	6	6
6	(Russia) Margarita Gasparyan	2	4
(Russia) Irina Khromacheva	6	7
2	(Slovenia) Dalila Jakupović	4	5

Final
5	(Thailand) Luksika Kumkhum	1	6	6
(Russia) Irina Khromacheva	6	2	3

=== Top half ===
First round
1	(China) S Zheng	6	6
WC	(India) K Thandi	2	4
(Netherlands) B Schoofs	6	6
(Croatia) J Fett	3	2
(Czech Republic) B Štefková	6	6
Q	(Czech Republic) T Martincová	4	4
Q	(India) P Yadlapalli	6	5	1
5	(Thailand) L Kumkhum	3	7	6
4	(Serbia) O Danilović	6	5	0
(Montenegro) D Kovinić	4	7	6
(India) A Raina	4	6	7^{7}
WC	(India) R Bhosale	6	2	6^{5}
LL	(Georgia (country)) S Shapatava	2	4
(Georgia (country)) E Gorgodze	6	6
(Croatia) T Mrdeža	3	2
6	(Russia) M Gasparyan	6	6

Second round
1	(China) S Zheng	6	6
(Netherlands) B Schoofs	4	2
(Czech Republic) B Štefková	3	4
5	(Thailand) L Kumkhum	6	6
(Montenegro) D Kovinić	6	7
(India) A Raina	2	5
(Georgia (country)) E Gorgodze	4	2
6	(Russia) M Gasparyan	6	6

Quarterfinals
1	(China) S Zheng	6	4	4
5	(Thailand) L Kumkhum	3	6	6
(Montenegro) D Kovinić	6^{4}	6	1
6	(Russia) M Gasparyan	7^{7}	4	6

Semifinals
5	(Thailand) L Kumkhum	6	6
6	(Russia) M Gasparyan	2	4

=== Bottom half ===
First round
7	(China) L Zhu	6^{5}	3
Q	(Poland) U Radwańska	7^{7}	6
(Russia) I Khromacheva	6	6
Q	(Japan) H Kuwata	1	4
WC	(Hong Kong) K-y Ng	0	2
(Greece) V Grammatikopoulou	6	6
(Israel) D Khazaniuk	2	7	5
3	(United States) S Vickery	6	5	1^{r}
8	(Japan) N Hibino	3	6	6
WC	(Germany) S Lisicki	6	3	4
(Serbia) I Jorović	7	1	1
(China) Jia Lu	5	6	6
(Uzbekistan) S Sharipova	6	7^{7}
(Japan) M Doi	1	6^{4}
(Russia) V Kudermetova	4	1
2	(Slovenia) D Jakupović	6	6

Second round
Q	(Poland) U Radwańska	6	1	2
(Russia) I Khromacheva	2	6	6
(Greece) V Grammatikopoulou	6	4	6
(Israel) D Khazaniuk	3	6	4
8	(Japan) N Hibino	4	3
(China) Jia Lu	6	6
(Uzbekistan) S Sharipova	4	2
2	(Slovenia) D Jakupović	6	6

Quarterfinals
(Russia) I Khromacheva	7	4	6
(Greece) V Grammatikopoulou	5	6	1
(China) Jia Lu	2	3
2	(Slovenia) D Jakupović	6	6

Semifinals
(Russia) I Khromacheva	6	7
2	(Slovenia) D Jakupović	4	5

== Qualifying ==
=== Seeds ===
1. (Czech Republic) Tereza Martincová (qualified)
2. (Japan) Hiroko Kuwata (qualified)
3. (India) Pranjala Yadlapalli (qualified)
4. (Poland) Urszula Radwańska (qualified)
5. (Serbia) Natalija Kostić (qualifying competition)
6. (Russia) Yana Sizikova (first round)
7. (Georgia (country)) Sofia Shapatava (qualifying competition, lucky loser)
8. (Kyrgyzstan) Ksenia Palkina (first round)

=== Qualifiers ===
1. (Czech Republic) Tereza Martincová
2. (Japan) Hiroko Kuwata
3. (India) Pranjala Yadlapalli
4. (Poland) Urszula Radwańska

=== Lucky loser ===
1. (Georgia (country)) Sofia Shapatava

=== Qualifying draw ===
==== First qualifier ====
First round
1	(Czech Republic) Tereza Martincová	6	6
(Japan) Naoko Eto	0	0
(India) Ashmitha Easwaramurthi	0	3
7	(Georgia (country)) Sofia Shapatava	6	6

Qualifying competition
1	(Czech Republic) Tereza Martincová	4	6	6
7	(Georgia (country)) Sofia Shapatava	6	3	0

==== Second qualifier ====
First round
2	(Japan) Hiroko Kuwata	6	6
(India) Sowjanya Bavisetti	3	1
WC	(India) Mahak Jain	3	6	7
6	(Russia) Yana Sizikova	6	3	5

Qualifying competition
2	(Japan) Hiroko Kuwata	6	6
WC	(India) Mahak Jain	3	4

==== Third qualifier ====
First round
3	(India) Pranjala Yadlapalli	6	6
WC	(India) Mihika Yadav	3	0
(Georgia (country)) Oksana Kalashnikova	6	6
8	(Kyrgyzstan) Ksenia Palkina	2	1

Qualifying competition
3	(India) Pranjala Yadlapalli	6	6
(Georgia (country)) Oksana Kalashnikova	3	3

==== Fourth qualifier ====
First round
4	(Poland) Urszula Radwańska	6	6
(United Kingdom) Emily Webley-Smith	4	3
(France) Fiona Codino	5	0
5	(Serbia) Natalija Kostić	7	6

Qualifying competition
4	(Poland) Urszula Radwańska	6	4	6
5	(Serbia) Natalija Kostić	4	6	1
