= 2018 OEC Taipei WTA Challenger – Singles =

Singles
- 2018 OEC Taipei WTA Challenger

Final
- Champion: (Thailand) Luksika Kumkhum
- Runner-up: (Germany) Sabine Lisicki
- Score: 6–1, 6–3

Events
Singles	Doubles
- OEC Taipei WTA Challenger

Belinda Bencic was the defending champion, but chose to compete in Houston instead.

Luksika Kumkhum won the title, defeating Sabine Lisicki 6–1, 6–3 in the final.

== Seeds ==
1. (China) Zheng Saisai (withdrew)
2. (Thailand) Luksika Kumkhum (champion)
3. (Russia) Margarita Gasparyan (withdrew)
4. (China) Zhu Lin (quarterfinals)
5. (Japan) Nao Hibino (quarterfinals)
6. (Russia) Vitalia Diatchenko (semifinals)
7. (Uzbekistan) Sabina Sharipova (first round)
8. (Japan) Misaki Doi (first round)

== Main draw ==
Key

- Q = Qualifier
- WC = Wild card
- LL = Lucky loser
- Alt = Alternate
- ITF = ITF entry
- PR = Protected ranking
- SR = Special ranking
- SE = Special exempt
- JE = Junior exempt
- JR = Junior Accelerator Programme entrant
- CO = College Accelerator Programme entrant
- NG = Next Gen Accelerator Program entrant
- w/o = Walkover
- r = Retired
- d = Defaulted

=== Finals ===
Semifinals
WC	(Germany) Sabine Lisicki	1	6	7
6	(Russia) Vitalia Diatchenko	6	3	5
(Netherlands) Bibiane Schoofs	5	3
2	(Thailand) Luksika Kumkhum	7	6

Final
WC	(Germany) Sabine Lisicki	1	3
2	(Thailand) Luksika Kumkhum	6	6

=== Top half ===
First round
LL	(Hong Kong) K-y Ng	2	2
(Greece) V Grammatikopoulou	6	6
(Austria) B Haas	6	0	3
WC	(Chinese Taipei) E-s Liang	3	6	6
(Poland) M Fręch	4	3
(Kazakhstan) E Rybakina	6	6
WC	(Germany) S Lisicki	6	6
8	(Japan) M Doi	3	2
4	(China) L Zhu	2	6	6
(Switzerland) J Teichmann	6	3	2
(Montenegro) D Kovinić	6	6
WC	(Hong Kong) L Zhang	3	1
Q	(China) Y Zhang	6	6
(China) Jia Lu	3	2
(Australia) P Hon	2	4
6	(Russia) V Diatchenko	6	6

Second round
(Greece) V Grammatikopoulou	3	1
WC	(Chinese Taipei) E-s Liang	6	6
(Kazakhstan) E Rybakina	4	3
WC	(Germany) S Lisicki	6	6
4	(China) L Zhu	6	4	6
(Montenegro) D Kovinić	1	6	3
Q	(China) Y Zhang	7	3	2
6	(Russia) V Diatchenko	5	6	6

Quarterfinals
WC	(Chinese Taipei) E-s Liang	4	0
WC	(Germany) S Lisicki	6	6
4	(China) L Zhu	1	0
6	(Russia) V Diatchenko	6	6

Semifinals
WC	(Germany) S Lisicki	1	6	7
6	(Russia) V Diatchenko	6	3	5

=== Bottom half ===
First round
7	(Uzbekistan) S Sharipova	0	2
(Serbia) I Jorović	6	6
Q	(Romania) E-G Ruse	4	5
Q	(Czech Republic) T Martincová	6	7
(Netherlands) B Schoofs	6	6
(Canada) C Zhao	3	2
(China) F Xun	7^{9}	7^{7}
(China) Y Duan	6^{7}	6^{5}
5	(Japan) N Hibino	7^{8}	6
(India) A Raina	6^{6}	1
(Sweden) S Celik	2	1
Q	(South Korea) S-j Jang	6	6
WC	(Chinese Taipei) J Garland	4	2
LL	(Australia) L Cabrera	6	6
(China) X Han	3	4
2	(Thailand) L Kumkhum	6	6

Second round
(Serbia) I Jorović	1	6^{5}
Q	(Czech Republic) T Martincová	6	7^{7}
(Netherlands) B Schoofs	6	6
(China) F Xun	4	2
5	(Japan) N Hibino	6	6
Q	(South Korea) S-j Jang	4	3
LL	(Australia) L Cabrera	3	4
2	(Thailand) L Kumkhum	6	6

Quarterfinals
Q	(Czech Republic) T Martincová	6^{3}	0^{r}
(Netherlands) B Schoofs	7^{7}	3
5	(Japan) N Hibino	3	1
2	(Thailand) L Kumkhum	6	6

Semifinals
(Netherlands) B Schoofs	5	3
2	(Thailand) L Kumkhum	7	6

== Qualifying ==
=== Seeds ===
1. (Japan) Ayano Shimizu (first round)
2. (India) Karman Thandi (qualifying competition)
3. (South Korea) Jang Su-jeong (qualified)
4. (China) Xun Fangying (moved to main draw)
5. (Czech Republic) Tereza Martincová (qualified)
6. (China) Zhang Yuxuan (qualified)
7. (Japan) Mayo Hibi (first round)
8. (Australia) Lizette Cabrera (qualifying competition, lucky loser)

=== Qualifiers ===
1. (Czech Republic) Tereza Martincová
2. (China) Zhang Yuxuan
3. (South Korea) Jang Su-jeong
4. (Romania) Elena-Gabriela Ruse

=== Lucky losers ===
1. (Australia) Lizette Cabrera
2. (Hong Kong) Ng Kwan-yau

=== Qualifying draw ===
==== First qualifier ====
First round
1	(Japan) Ayano Shimizu	4	4
(Chinese Taipei) Lee Ya-hsuan	6	6
(China) Zhang Kailin	4	4
5	(Czech Republic) Tereza Martincová	6	6

Qualifying competition
(Chinese Taipei) Lee Ya-hsuan	3	0
5	(Czech Republic) Tereza Martincová	6	6

==== Second qualifier ====
First round
2	(India) Karman Thandi	6	6
WC	(Hong Kong) Ng Kwan-yau	4	4
WC	(Chinese Taipei) Yang Ya-yi	0	1
6	(China) Zhang Yuxuan	6	6

Qualifying competition
2	(India) Karman Thandi	2	2
6	(China) Zhang Yuxuan	6	6

==== Third qualifier ====
First round
3	(South Korea) Jang Su-jeong	6	6
(Japan) Momoko Kobori	1	4
(Japan) Junri Namigata	4	3
8	(Australia) Lizette Cabrera	6	6

Qualifying competition
3	(South Korea) Jang Su-jeong	6	6
8	(Australia) Lizette Cabrera	4	4

==== Fourth qualifier ====
First round
Alt	(Thailand) Peangtarn Plipuech	2	3
(Russia) Olga Doroshina	6	6
(Romania) Elena-Gabriela Ruse	7^{7}	2	6
7	(Japan) Mayo Hibi	6^{4}	6	4

Qualifying competition
(Russia) Olga Doroshina	5	5
(Romania) Elena-Gabriela Ruse	7	7
