= 2018 Mumbai Open – Doubles =

Doubles
- 2018 Mumbai Open

Final
- Champion: (Russia) Natela Dzalamidze (Russia) Veronika Kudermetova
- Runner-up: (Netherlands) Bibiane Schoofs (Czech Republic) Barbora Štefková
- Score: 6–4, 7–6^{(7–4)}

Events
Singles	Doubles
← 2017 ·	Mumbai Open	· 2024 →

Natela Dzalamidze and Veronika Kudermetova won the title, defeating Schoofs and Barbora Štefková in the final, 6–4, 7–6^{(7–4)}.

Victoria Rodríguez and Bibiane Schoofs were the defending champions, but Rodríguez chose not to participate this year.

== Seeds ==
1. (Slovenia) Dalila Jakupović / (Russia) Irina Khromacheva (semifinals)
2. (Japan) Nao Hibino / (Georgia (country)) Oksana Kalashnikova (quarterfinals)
3. (Russia) Natela Dzalamidze / (Russia) Veronika Kudermetova (champions)
4. (Netherlands) Bibiane Schoofs / (Czech Republic) Barbora Štefková (final)

== Draw ==
=== Key ===
- Q = Qualifier
- WC = Wild card
- LL = Lucky loser
- Alt = Alternate
- SE = Special exempt
- PR = Protected ranking
- ITF = ITF entry
- JE = Junior exempt
- w/o = Walkover
- r = Retired
- d = Defaulted
- SR = Special ranking

First round
1	(Slovenia) D Jakupović (Russia) I Khromacheva	6	6
(Georgia (country)) S Shapatava (United Kingdom) E Webley-Smith	0	2
(India) R Bhosale (Japan) H Kuwata	7	3	[11]
(Croatia) T Mrdeža (India) A Raina	5	6	[9]
3	(Russia) N Dzalamidze (Russia) V Kudermetova	6	6
WC	(India) M Jain (India) M Yadav	1	1
(Japan) M Doi (Czech Republic) T Martincová	6	4	[10]
(Greece) V Grammatikopoulou (China) Jia Lu	2	6	[4]
(Thailand) L Kumkhum (India) P Thombare	2	6	[7]
(Chinese Taipei) S-y Hsieh (Serbia) N Kostić	6	2	[10]
(Georgia (country)) E Gorgodze (Israel) D Khazaniuk	4	6^{2}
4	(Netherlands) B Schoofs (Czech Republic) B Štefková	6	7^{7}
(Hong Kong) K-y Ng (China) S Zheng	4	6^{3}
(Serbia) O Danilović (Montenegro) D Kovinić	6	7^{7}
(Kyrgyzstan) K Palkina (Russia) Y Sizikova	1	1
2	(Japan) N Hibino (Georgia (country)) O Kalashnikova	6	6

Quarterfinals
1	(Slovenia) D Jakupović (Russia) I Khromacheva	6	6
(India) R Bhosale (Japan) H Kuwata	3	3
3	(Russia) N Dzalamidze (Russia) V Kudermetova	6	6
(Japan) M Doi (Czech Republic) T Martincová	1	1
(Chinese Taipei) S-y Hsieh (Serbia) N Kostić	6	6^{3}	[5]
4	(Netherlands) B Schoofs (Czech Republic) B Štefková	1	7^{7}	[10]
(Serbia) O Danilović (Montenegro) D Kovinić	6	6
2	(Japan) N Hibino (Georgia (country)) O Kalashnikova	2	1

Semifinals
1	(Slovenia) D Jakupović (Russia) I Khromacheva	5	3
3	(Russia) N Dzalamidze (Russia) V Kudermetova	7	6
4	(Netherlands) B Schoofs (Czech Republic) B Štefková	3	7^{7}	[10]
(Serbia) O Danilović (Montenegro) D Kovinić	6	6^{5}	[8]

Final
3	(Russia) N Dzalamidze (Russia) V Kudermetova	6	7^{7}
4	(Netherlands) B Schoofs (Czech Republic) B Štefková	4	6^{4}
