= 2024 Mumbai Open – Doubles =

Draw of a professional tennis tournament

Doubles
- 2024 Mumbai Open

Final
- Champion: (Slovenia) Dalila Jakupović (United States) Sabrina Santamaria
- Runner-up: (Netherlands) Arianne Hartono (India) Prarthana Thombare
- Score: 6–4, 6–3

Events
Singles	Doubles
← 2018 ·	Mumbai Open	· 2025 →

Dalila Jakupović and Sabrina Santamaria won the title, defeating Arianne Hartono and Prarthana Thombare in the final, 6–4, 6–3.

Natela Dzalamidze and Veronika Kudermetova were the reigning champions from when the tournament was last held in 2018, but Kudermetova chose not to participate this year. Dzalamidze partnered Panna Udvardy, but they withdrew before their quarterfinal match with Jakupović and Santamaria.

== Seeds ==
1. (Italy) Angelica Moratelli / (Italy) Camilla Rosatello (first round)
2. (Slovenia) Dalila Jakupović / (United States) Sabrina Santamaria (champions)
3. (Germany) Julia Lohoff / (Switzerland) Conny Perrin (first round)
4. (Thailand) Luksika Kumkhum / (Thailand) Peangtarn Plipuech (first round)

== Draw ==
=== Key ===
- Q = Qualifier
- WC = Wild card
- LL = Lucky loser
- Alt = Alternate
- ITF = ITF entry
- PR = Protected ranking
- SR = Special ranking
- SE = Special exempt
- JE = Junior exempt
- JR = Junior Accelerator Programme entrant
- CO = College Accelerator Programme entrant
- NG = Next Gen Accelerator Program entrant
- w/o = Walkover
- r = Retired
- d = Defaulted

First round
1	(Italy) A Moratelli (Italy) C Rosatello	6^{4}	2
(Kazakhstan) Z Kulambayeva (South Korea) S-h Park	7^{7}	6
Alt	(France) C Monnet; E Yashina	7^{9}	6
(Greece) V Grammatikopoulou (Latvia) D Semeņistaja	6^{7}	4
4	(Thailand) L Kumkhum (Thailand) P Plipuech	4	6	[6]
(Netherlands) A Hartono (India) P Thombare	6	2	[10]
(Greece) S Sakellaridi (Australia) O Tjandramulia	6	6
E Makarova (Japan) H Sakatsume	2	3
(United Kingdom) N Bains (Hungary) F Stollár	3	6	[10]
WC	(India) A Raina (India) R Bhosale	6	2	[8]
A Tikhonova (Japan) M Uchijima	6	7
3	(Germany) J Lohoff (Switzerland) C Perrin	4	5
(Chinese Taipei) E-s Liang (Chinese Taipei) C-y Tsao	6	4	[7]
(Georgia (country)) N Dzalamidze (Hungary) P Udvardy	4	6	[10]
Alt	(India) V Adkar (India) S Yamalapalli	3	6^{1}
2	(Slovenia) D Jakupović (United States) S Santamaria	6	7^{7}

Quarterfinals
(Kazakhstan) Z Kulambayeva (South Korea) S-h Park	7^{7}	6
Alt	(France) C Monnet; E Yashina	6^{4}	1
(Netherlands) A Hartono (India) P Thombare	6	6
(Greece) S Sakellaridi (Australia) O Tjandramulia	4	2
(United Kingdom) N Bains (Hungary) F Stollár	6	6
A Tikhonova (Japan) M Uchijima	2	2
(Georgia (country)) N Dzalamidze (Hungary) P Udvardy
2	(Slovenia) D Jakupović (United States) S Santamaria	w/o

Semifinals
(Kazakhstan) Z Kulambayeva (South Korea) S-h Park	2	1
(Netherlands) A Hartono (India) P Thombare	6	6
(United Kingdom) N Bains (Hungary) F Stollár	4	1
2	(Slovenia) D Jakupović (United States) S Santamaria	6	6

Finals
(Netherlands) A Hartono (India) P Thombare	4	3
2	(Slovenia) D Jakupović (United States) S Santamaria	6	6
