= 2018 Oracle Challenger Series – Newport Beach – Men's singles =

Newport Beach – Men's singles
- 2018 Oracle Challenger Series – Newport Beach

Final
- Champion: (United States) Taylor Fritz
- Runner-up: (United States) Bradley Klahn
- Score: 3–6, 7–5, 6–0

Events
Singles	men	women
Doubles	men	women
- Oracle Challenger Series – Newport Beach

This was the first edition of the tournament.

Taylor Fritz won the title after defeating Bradley Klahn 3–6, 7–5, 6–0 in the final.

== Seeds ==
1. (Japan) Kei Nishikori (first round)
2. (United States) Frances Tiafoe (first round)
3. (United States) Taylor Fritz (champion)
4. (United States) Bjorn Fratangelo (second round, retired)
5. (United Kingdom) Cameron Norrie (first round)
6. (Kazakhstan) Alexander Bublik (second round)
7. (United States) Ernesto Escobedo (first round)
8. (Germany) Yannick Hanfmann (first round)

== Draw ==
Key

- Q = Qualifier
- WC = Wild card
- LL = Lucky loser
- Alt = Alternate
- ITF = ITF entry
- PR = Protected ranking
- SR = Special ranking
- SE = Special exempt
- JE = Junior exempt
- JR = Junior Accelerator Programme entrant
- CO = College Accelerator Programme entrant
- NG = Next Gen Accelerator Program entrant
- w/o = Walkover
- r = Retired
- d = Defaulted

=== Finals ===
Semifinals
WC	(United States) Reilly Opelka	3	6^{6}
3	(United States) Taylor Fritz	6	7^{8}
Q	(Chile) Christian Garín	3	6	4
(United States) Bradley Klahn	6	0	6

Final
3	(United States) Taylor Fritz	3	7	6
(United States) Bradley Klahn	6	5	0

=== Top half ===
First round
1/WC	(Japan) K Nishikori	3	6	4
Q	(United States) D Novikov	6	3	6
(United States) D Kudla	6^{5}	3
WC	(United States) R Opelka	7^{7}	6
(Switzerland) H Laaksonen	6^{9}	2
(Canada) F Peliwo	7^{11}	6
(Germany) M Bachinger	6	7^{9}
7	(United States) E Escobedo	3	6^{7}
3	(United States) T Fritz	6	6
Q	(Spain) G Olaso	3	4
(El Salvador) M Arévalo	4	4
WC	(United States) T-S Kwiatkowski	6	6
(United States) N Rubin	7^{7}	6
(United States) T Smyczek	6^{5}	2
(Canada) P Polansky	6	3	0
6	(Kazakhstan) A Bublik	3	6	6

Second round
Q	(United States) D Novikov	4	4
WC	(United States) R Opelka	6	6
(Canada) F Peliwo	3	6^{3}
(Germany) M Bachinger	6	7^{7}
3	(United States) T Fritz	6	6
WC	(United States) T-S Kwiatkowski	4	4
(United States) N Rubin	6^{6}	6	7^{10}
6	(Kazakhstan) A Bublik	7^{8}	4	6^{8}

Quarterfinals
WC	(United States) R Opelka	7	6
(Germany) M Bachinger	5	4
3	(United States) T Fritz	6	6
(United States) N Rubin	3	2

Semifinals
WC	(United States) R Opelka	3	6^{6}
3	(United States) T Fritz	6	7^{8}

=== Bottom half ===
First round
5	(United Kingdom) C Norrie	2	4
(United States) M Mmoh	6	6
(Japan) T Ito	7^{7}	4	1^{r}
(Barbados) D King	6^{4}	6	2
WC	(United States) T Paul	4	3
Q	(Chile) C Garín	6	6
Q	(United States) T Fawcett	4	2
4	(United States) B Fratangelo	6	6
8	(Germany) Y Hanfmann	4	3
(United States) B Klahn	6	6
(United States) M Krueger	7^{7}	6
(Portugal) G Oliveira	6^{5}	2
(Brazil) G Clezar	2	3
(United States) S Kozlov	6	6
(Serbia) M Kecmanović	6	3	6
2	(United States) F Tiafoe	4	6	3

Second round
(United States) M Mmoh	6	2	1
(Barbados) D King	1	6	6
Q	(Chile) C Garín	6	1
4	(United States) B Fratangelo	3	0^{r}
(United States) B Klahn	6	1	6
(United States) M Krueger	3	6	4
(United States) S Kozlov	3	4
(Serbia) M Kecmanović	6	6

Quarterfinals
(Barbados) D King	7	2	3
Q	(Chile) C Garín	5	6	6
(United States) B Klahn	7^{9}	6
(Serbia) M Kecmanović	6^{7}	1

Semifinals
Q	(Chile) C Garín	3	6	4
(United States) B Klahn	6	0	6
