= 2024 Mumbai Open =

- Date: 5 – 11 February
- Edition: 3rd
- Draw: 32S / 16D / 16Q
- Prize money: $115,000
- Surface: Hard
- Location: Mumbai, India
- Venue: Cricket Club of India

Champions

Singles
- (Latvia) Darja Semeņistaja

Doubles
- (Slovenia) Dalila Jakupović / (United States) Sabrina Santamaria
- Mumbai Open

The 2024 L&T Mumbai Open was a professional women's tennis tournament played on outdoor hard courts. It was the third edition of the tournament and first since 2018 which was also part of the 2024 WTA 125 tournaments. It took place from 5 to 11 February 2024 at the Cricket Club of India.

== WTA singles main-draw entrants ==
=== Seeds ===
| Country | Player | Rank^{1} | Seed |
|---|---|---|---|
| USA | Kayla Day | 92 | 1 |
| JPN | Nao Hibino | 94 | 2 |
| ~~SLO~~ | ~~Tamara Zidanšek~~ | ~~97~~ | ~~3~~ |
| AUS | Arina Rodionova | 101 | 4 |
| BRA | Laura Pigossi | 114 | 5 |
| LAT | Darja Semeņistaja | 120 | 6 |
| AUS | Kimberly Birrell | 124 | 7 |
| USA | Katie Volynets | 125 | 8 |

- ^{1} Rankings are as of 29 January 2024.

=== Other entrants ===
The following players received wildcards into the singles main draw:

- (India) Vaishnavi Adkar
- (India) Rutuja Bhosale
- (India) Ankita Raina
- (India) Sahaja Yamalapalli

The following players received entry from the qualifying draw:

- (India) Shrivalli Bhamidipaty
- (Israel) Lina Glushko
- (France) Amandine Hesse
- (Thailand) Peangtarn Plipuech
- ~~(Japan) Himeno Sakatsume~~
- (Hungary) Fanny Stollár

The following players received entry into the main draw as lucky losers:

- (South Korea) Park So-hyun
- (Italy) Camilla Rosatello

=== Withdrawals ===
- (Japan) Himeno Sakatsume → replaced by (South Korea) Park So-hyun
- (Slovenia) Tamara Zidanšek → replaced by (Italy) Camilla Rosatello

== WTA doubles main-draw entrants ==
=== Seeds ===
| Country | Player | Country | Player | Rank^{1} | Seed |
|---|---|---|---|---|---|
| ITA | Angelica Moratelli | ITA | Camilla Rosatello | 167 | 1 |
| SLO | Dalila Jakupović | USA | Sabrina Santamaria | 183 | 2 |
| GER | Julia Lohoff | SUI | Conny Perrin | 222 | 3 |
| THA | Luksika Kumkhum | THA | Peangtarn Plipuech | 248 | 4 |

- ^{1} Rankings as of 29 January 2024.

=== Other entrants ===
The following team received wildcard into the doubles main draw:

- (India) Rutuja Bhosale / (India) Ankita Raina

== Champions ==
=== Singles ===
- (Latvia) Darja Semeņistaja def. (Australia) Storm Hunter 5–7, 7–6^{(8–6)}, 6–2

=== Doubles ===
- (Slovenia) Dalila Jakupović / (United States) Sabrina Santamaria def. (Netherlands) Arianne Hartono / (India) Prarthana Thombare, 6–4, 6–3.
