= 2018 Oracle Challenger Series – Newport Beach – Men's doubles =

Newport Beach – Men's doubles
- 2018 Oracle Challenger Series – Newport Beach

Final
- Champions: (United States) James Cerretani (India) Leander Paes
- Runners-up: (Philippines) Treat Huey (United States) Denis Kudla
- Score: 6–4, 7–5

Events
Singles	men	women
Doubles	men	women
- Oracle Challenger Series – Newport Beach

This was the first edition of the tournament.

James Cerretani and Leander Paes won the title after defeating Treat Huey and Denis Kudla 6–4, 7–5 in the final.

== Seeds ==
1. (Netherlands) Wesley Koolhof / (New Zealand) Artem Sitak (first round)
2. (United States) James Cerretani / (India) Leander Paes (champions)
3. (United States) Scott Lipsky / (Spain) David Marrero (semifinals)
4. (El Salvador) Marcelo Arévalo / (Mexico) Miguel Ángel Reyes-Varela (semifinals)

== Draw ==
Key

- Q = Qualifier
- WC = Wild card
- LL = Lucky loser
- Alt = Alternate
- ITF = ITF entry
- PR = Protected ranking
- SR = Special ranking
- SE = Special exempt
- JE = Junior exempt
- JR = Junior Accelerator Programme entrant
- CO = College Accelerator Programme entrant
- NG = Next Gen Accelerator Program entrant
- w/o = Walkover
- r = Retired
- d = Defaulted

First round
1	(Netherlands) W Koolhof (New Zealand) A Sitak	2	1
(Philippines) T Huey (United States) D Kudla	6	6
(Kazakhstan) A Bublik (Sweden) A Siljeström	1	3
WC	(United States) T Fritz (United States) R Opelka	6	6
3	(United States) S Lipsky (Spain) D Marrero	6	3	[12]
(United States) E Escobedo (Portugal) G Oliveira	2	6	[10]
(India) J Nedunchezhiyan (Indonesia) C Rungkat	3	6	[10]
WC	(United States) H Reese (United States) R Sarmiento	6	3	[5]
(Belarus) A Bury (Chinese Taipei) H-y Peng	6	6
(United States) A Krajicek (United States) J Withrow	4	4
(United Kingdom) L Bambridge (United Kingdom) J Salisbury	6^{3}	7^{7}	[5]
4	(El Salvador) M Arévalo (Mexico) MÁ Reyes-Varela	7^{7}	6^{2}	[10]
(United States) M Mmoh (United States) F Tiafoe	7^{10}	3	[10]
WC	(United States) C Eubanks (United States) B Klahn	6^{8}	6	[8]
(Uruguay) A Behar (Argentina) M González	5	3
2	(United States) J Cerretani (India) L Paes	7	6

Quarterfinals
(Philippines) T Huey (United States) D Kudla	6	6
WC	(United States) T Fritz (United States) R Opelka	4	3
3	(United States) S Lipsky (Spain) D Marrero	6^{4}	6	[10]
(India) J Nedunchezhiyan (Indonesia) C Rungkat	7^{7}	4	[8]
(Belarus) A Bury (Chinese Taipei) H-y Peng	5	5
4	(El Salvador) M Arévalo (Mexico) MÁ Reyes-Varela	7	7
(United States) M Mmoh (United States) F Tiafoe
2	(United States) J Cerretani (India) L Paes	w/o

Semifinals
(Philippines) T Huey (United States) D Kudla	6	6
3	(United States) S Lipsky (Spain) D Marrero	4	0
4	(El Salvador) M Arévalo (Mexico) MÁ Reyes-Varela	3	3
2	(United States) J Cerretani (India) L Paes	6	6

Final
(Philippines) T Huey (United States) D Kudla	4	5
2	(United States) J Cerretani (India) L Paes	6	7
