= 2024 Mumbai Open – Singles =

Draw of a professional tennis tournament

Singles
- 2024 Mumbai Open

Final
- Champion: (Latvia) Darja Semeņistaja
- Runner-up: (Australia) Storm Hunter
- Score: 5–7, 7–6^{(8–6)}, 6–2

Events
Singles	Doubles
← 2018 ·	Mumbai Open	· 2025 →

Darja Semeņistaja won her first WTA 125 singles title, defeating Storm Hunter in the final, 5–7, 7–6^{(8–6)}, 6–2. She saved a championship point in the second-set tiebreak.

Luksika Kumkhum was the defending champion from when the tournament was last held in 2018, but she chose not to participate.

== Seeds ==
1. (United States) Kayla Day (first round)
2. (Japan) Nao Hibino (first round)
3. (Slovenia) Tamara Zidanšek (withdrew)
4. (Australia) Arina Rodionova (second round)
5. (Brazil) Laura Pigossi (second round)
6. (Latvia) Darja Semeņistaja (champion)
7. (Australia) Kimberly Birrell (first round)
8. (United States) Katie Volynets (semifinals)

== Draw ==
=== Key ===
- Q = Qualifier
- WC = Wild card
- LL = Lucky loser
- Alt = Alternate
- ITF = ITF entry
- PR = Protected ranking
- SR = Special ranking
- SE = Special exempt
- JE = Junior exempt
- JR = Junior Accelerator Programme entrant
- CO = College Accelerator Programme entrant
- NG = Next Gen Accelerator Program entrant
- w/o = Walkover
- r = Retired
- d = Defaulted

=== Finals ===
Semifinals
6	(Latvia) Darja Semeņistaja	7	6
(Netherlands) Arianne Hartono	5	4
8	(United States) Katie Volynets	4	6^{4}
(Australia) Storm Hunter	6	7^{7}

Final
6	(Latvia) Darja Semeņistaja	5	7^{8}	6
(Australia) Storm Hunter	7	6^{6}	2

=== Top half ===
First round
1	(United States) K Day	4	6	4
WC	(India) S Yamalapalli	6	1	6
A Zakharova	6^{8}	0
P Kudermetova	7^{10}	6
Q	(Israel) L Glushko	1	1
Q	(France) A Hesse	6	6
(Hungary) P Udvardy	5	6	2
6	(Latvia) D Semeņistaja	7	3	6
4	(Australia) Ar Rodionova	6	7
(Netherlands) S Lamens	2	5
(Romania) I Bara	4	4
(Netherlands) A Hartono	6	6
(France) C Monnet	3	3
(Japan) M Uchijima	6	6
(Hungary) D Gálfi	6	4	7
7	(Australia) K Birrell	2	6	5

Second round
WC	(India) S Yamalapalli	6	3	5
P Kudermetova	1	6	7
Q	(France) A Hesse	6	4	4
6	(Latvia) D Semeņistaja	2	6	6
4	(Australia) Ar Rodionova	4	4
(Netherlands) A Hartono	6	6
(Japan) M Uchijima	6	6
(Hungary) D Gálfi	2	1

Quarterfinals
P Kudermetova	4	3
6	(Latvia) D Semeņistaja	6	6
(Netherlands) A Hartono	6	4
(Japan) M Uchijima	3	3^{r}

Semifinals
6	(Latvia) D Semeņistaja	7	6
(Netherlands) A Hartono	5	4

=== Bottom half ===
First round
8	(United States) K Volynets	6	6
WC	(India) A Raina	4	2
Q	(Thailand) P Plipuech	4	5
WC	(India) R Bhosale	6	7
WC	(India) V Adkar	2	6	1
LL	(South Korea) S-h Park	6	2	6
A Tikhonova	5	6	2
LL	(Italy) C Rosatello	7	3	6
5	(Brazil) L Pigossi	6	3
E Makarova	1	0^{r}
Q	(Hungary) F Stollár	0^{r}
(Australia) S Hunter	3
A Korneeva	6	6
(France) C Paquet	1	3
Q	(India) S Bhamidipaty	2	6	7^{7}
2	(Japan) N Hibino	6	1	6^{5}

Second round
8	(United States) K Volynets	7^{10}	2	6
WC	(India) R Bhosale	6^{8}	6	1
LL	(South Korea) S-h Park	6	5	6
LL	(Italy) C Rosatello	3	7	3
5	(Brazil) L Pigossi	3	3
(Australia) S Hunter	6	6
A Korneeva	5	6	6
Q	(India) S Bhamidipaty	7	4	4

Quarterfinals
8	(United States) K Volynets	6	6
LL	(South Korea) S-h Park	1	2
(Australia) S Hunter	w/o
A Korneeva

Semifinals
8	(United States) K Volynets	4	6^{4}
(Australia) S Hunter	6	7^{7}

== Qualifying ==
=== Seeds ===
1. (Japan) Himeno Sakatsume (qualified, withdrew)
2. (Greece) Valentini Grammatikopoulou (first round)
3. (Uzbekistan) Nigina Abduraimova (first round)
4. (Serbia) Dejana Radanović (first round, retired)
5. (Chinese Taipei) Liang En-shuo (first round)
6. (Hungary) Fanny Stollár (qualified)
7. (Greece) Sapfo Sakellaridi (first round)
8. (Latvia) Diāna Marcinkēviča (first round)
9. (France) Amandine Hesse (qualified)
10. (South Korea) Park So-hyun (qualifying competition, lucky loser)
11. (Italy) Camilla Rosatello (qualifying competition, lucky loser)
12. (Switzerland) Conny Perrin (first round)

=== Qualifiers ===
1. ~~(Japan) Himeno Sakatsume~~
2. (India) Shrivalli Bhamidipaty
3. (Thailand) Peangtarn Plipuech
4. (France) Amandine Hesse
5. (Israel) Lina Glushko
6. (Hungary) Fanny Stollár

=== Lucky losers ===
1. (South Korea) Park So-hyun
2. (Italy) Camilla Rosatello

=== Qualifying draw ===
==== First qualifier ====
First round
1	(Japan) Himeno Sakatsume	6	6
WC	(India) Akanksha Dileep Nitture	3	1
WC	(India) Zeel Desai	6	6
7	(Greece) Sapfo Sakellaridi	2	1

Qualifying competition
1	(Japan) Himeno Sakatsume	7	0
WC	(India) Zeel Desai	5	0^{r}

==== Second qualifier ====
First round
2	(Greece) Valentini Grammatikopoulou	3	2
(India) Shrivalli Bhamidipaty	6	6
(Slovakia) Viktória Morvayová	1	6	6
12	(Switzerland) Conny Perrin	6	4	1

Qualifying competition
(India) Shrivalli Bhamidipaty	6	3	6
(Slovakia) Viktória Morvayová	3	6	3

==== Third qualifier ====
First round
3	(Uzbekistan) Nigina Abduraimova	7	6^{5}	2
(Chinese Taipei) Tsao Chia-yi	5	7^{7}	6
(Thailand) Peangtarn Plipuech	6	6
8	(Latvia) Diāna Marcinkēviča	2	0

Qualifying competition
(Chinese Taipei) Tsao Chia-yi	3	3
(Thailand) Peangtarn Plipuech	6	6

==== Fourth qualifier ====
First round
4	(Serbia) Dejana Radanović	2^{r}
(India) Vaidehi Chaudhari	3
WC	(India) Sameeksha Shroff	1	0
9	(France) Amandine Hesse	6	6

Qualifying competition
(India) Vaidehi Chaudhari	3	1
9	(France) Amandine Hesse	6	6

==== Fifth qualifier ====
First round
5	(Chinese Taipei) Liang En-shuo	7	1	6^{5}
(Israel) Lina Glushko	5	6	7^{7}
(Kazakhstan) Zhibek Kulambayeva	6	4	3
11	(Italy) Camilla Rosatello	4	6	6

Qualifying competition
(Israel) Lina Glushko	6	6
11	(Italy) Camilla Rosatello	3	3

==== Sixth qualifier ====
First round
6	(Hungary) Fanny Stollár	5	7	6
(United Kingdom) Naiktha Bains	7	5	1
WC	(India) Madhurima Sawant	1	1
10	(South Korea) Park So-hyun	6	6

Qualifying competition
6	(Hungary) Fanny Stollár	6	6
10	(South Korea) Park So-hyun	4	3
