= 2018 Oracle Challenger Series – Newport Beach =

- Date: January 22–28
- Edition: 1st
- Category: ATP Challenger Tour; WTA 125K series
- Draw: 32S / 16D
- Prize money: $150,000+H (ATP) $150,000 (WTA)
- Surface: Hard, outdoor
- Location: Newport Beach, United States
- Venue: Newport Beach Tennis Club

Champions

Men's singles
- (United States) Taylor Fritz

Women's singles
- (United States) Danielle Collins

Men's doubles
- (United States) James Cerretani / (India) Leander Paes

Women's doubles
- (Japan) Misaki Doi / (Switzerland) Jil Teichmann
Oracle Challenger Series – Newport Beach	· 2019 →

The 2018 Oracle Challenger Series – Newport Beach was a professional tennis tournament played on outdoor hard courts. It was the first edition of the tournament, which was part of the 2018 ATP Challenger Tour and the 2018 WTA 125K series. It took place January 22 through 28, 2018 in Newport Beach, United States.

== Men's singles main-draw entrants ==
=== Seeds ===
Country	Player	Rank^{1}	Seed
JPN	Kei Nishikori	24	1
USA	Frances Tiafoe	81	2
USA	Taylor Fritz	91	3
USA	Bjorn Fratangelo	104	4
GBR	Cameron Norrie	111	5
KAZ	Alexander Bublik	112	6
USA	Ernesto Escobedo	114	7
GER	Yannick Hanfmann	115	8

- ^{1} Rankings are as of 15 January 2018.

=== Other entrants ===
The following players received wildcards into the singles main draw:

- (United States) Thai-Son Kwiatkowski
- (Japan) Kei Nishikori
- (United States) Reilly Opelka
- (United States) Tommy Paul

The following players received entry from the qualifying draw:

- (United States) Tom Fawcett
- (Chile) Christian Garín
- (United States) Dennis Novikov
- (Spain) Guillermo Olaso

== Women's singles main-draw entrants ==
=== Seeds ===
Country	Player	Rank^{1}	Seed
USA	Christina McHale	73	1
USA	Alison Riske	84	2
USA	Taylor Townsend	89	3
ITA	Francesca Schiavone	93	4
USA	Sofia Kenin	102	5
USA	Sachia Vickery	106	6
CRO	Ajla Tomljanović	107	7
COL	Mariana Duque Mariño	109	8

- ^{1} Rankings are as of 15 January 2018.

=== Other entrants ===
The following players received wildcards into the singles main draw:

- (United States) Jacqueline Cako
- (United States) Danielle Collins
- (United States) Victoria Duval
- (United States) Claire Liu

The following players received entry from the qualifying draw:

- (United States) Amanda Anisimova
- (Czech Republic) Marie Bouzková
- (Japan) Mayo Hibi
- (Bulgaria) Elitsa Kostova
- (Chile) Daniela Seguel
- (Russia) Sofya Zhuk

=== Withdrawals ===
Before the tournament

- (United States) Jennifer Brady → replaced by (South Korea) Jang Su-jeong
- (United States) Madison Brengle → replaced by (Switzerland) Stefanie Vögele
- (Montenegro) Danka Kovinić → replaced by (Canada) Carol Zhao
- (United States) Varvara Lepchenko → replaced by (Switzerland) Jil Teichmann

== Women's doubles main-draw entrants ==
=== Seeds ===
Country	Player	Country	Player	Rank^{1}	Seed
COL	Mariana Duque Mariño	ARG	María Irigoyen	183	1
USA	Desirae Krawczyk	MEX	Giuliana Olmos	242	2
USA	Kayla Day	USA	Caroline Dolehide	247	3
USA	Taylor Townsend	BEL	Yanina Wickmayer	286	4

== Champions ==
=== Men's singles ===
- (United States) Taylor Fritz def. (United States) Bradley Klahn 3–6, 7–5, 6–0.

=== Men's doubles ===
- (United States) James Cerretani / (India) Leander Paes def. (Philippines) Treat Huey / (United States) Denis Kudla 6–4, 7–5.

=== Women's singles ===
- (United States) Danielle Collins def. (Russia) Sofya Zhuk 2–6, 6–4, 6–3

=== Women's doubles ===
- (Japan) Misaki Doi / (Switzerland) Jil Teichmann def. (United States) Jamie Loeb / (Sweden) Rebecca Peterson 7–6^{(7–4)}, 1–6, [10–8]
