= 2018 Oracle Challenger Series – Newport Beach – Women's doubles =

Newport Beach – Women's doubles
- 2018 Oracle Challenger Series – Newport Beach

Final
- Champions: (Japan) Misaki Doi (Switzerland) Jil Teichmann
- Runners-up: (United States) Jamie Loeb (Sweden) Rebecca Peterson
- Score: 7–6^{(7–4)}, 1–6, [10–8]

Events
Singles	men	women
Doubles	men	women
Oracle Challenger Series – Newport Beach	· 2019 →

This was the first edition of the tournament.

Misaki Doi and Jil Teichmann won the title after defeating Jamie Loeb and Rebecca Peterson 7–6^{(7–4)}, 1–6, [10–8] in the final.

== Seeds ==
1. (Colombia) Mariana Duque Mariño / (Argentina) María Irigoyen (first round)
2. (United States) Desirae Krawczyk / (Mexico) Giuliana Olmos (first round)
3. (United States) Kayla Day / (United States) Caroline Dolehide (quarterfinals)
4. (United States) Taylor Townsend / (Belgium) Yanina Wickmayer (quarterfinals)

== Draw ==
=== Key ===
- Q = Qualifier
- WC = Wild card
- LL = Lucky loser
- Alt = Alternate
- SE = Special exempt
- PR = Protected ranking
- ITF = ITF entry
- JE = Junior exempt
- w/o = Walkover
- r = Retired
- d = Defaulted
- SR = Special ranking

First round
1	(Colombia) M Duque Mariño (Argentina) M Irigoyen	6^{5}	6	[8]
(Bulgaria) E Kostova (Chile) D Seguel	7^{7}	3	[10]
(United States) J Boserup (Czech Republic) E Hrdinová	3	4
(United States) J Loeb (Sweden) R Peterson	6	6
3	(United States) K Day (United States) C Dolehide	7	6
(United States) E Bektas (Chile) A Guarachi	5	4
(Serbia) B Bonić (Czech Republic) K Muchová	7	2	[3]
(United States) K Christian (United States) S Santamaria	5	6	[10]
(Hungary) F Stollár (Canada) C Zhao	7^{12}	6
(United States) N Gibbs (United States) C McHale	6^{10}	4
(France) A Hesse (Mexico) V Rodríguez	4	2
4	(United States) T Townsend (Belgium) Y Wickmayer	6	6
(Serbia) J Jakšić (Russia) E Rodina	6	6
(United States) J Cako (United States) S Vickery	2	2
(Japan) M Doi (Switzerland) J Teichmann	6	6
2	(United States) D Krawczyk (Mexico) G Olmos	2	1

Quarterfinals
(Bulgaria) E Kostova (Chile) D Seguel	6	3	[5]
(United States) J Loeb (Sweden) R Peterson	4	6	[10]
3	(United States) K Day (United States) C Dolehide	3	3
(United States) K Christian (United States) S Santamaria	6	6
(Hungary) F Stollár (Canada) C Zhao	7^{7}	2	[10]
4	(United States) T Townsend (Belgium) Y Wickmayer	6^{4}	6	[4]
(Serbia) J Jakšić (Russia) E Rodina	0	6	[6]
(Japan) M Doi (Switzerland) J Teichmann	6	0	[10]

Semifinals
(United States) J Loeb (Sweden) R Peterson	3	6	[10]
(United States) K Christian (United States) S Santamaria	6	4	[7]
(Hungary) F Stollár (Canada) C Zhao	4	3
(Japan) M Doi (Switzerland) J Teichmann	6	6

Final
(United States) J Loeb (Sweden) R Peterson	6^{4}	6	[8]
(Japan) M Doi (Switzerland) J Teichmann	7^{7}	1	[10]
