= 2018 OEC Taipei WTA Challenger – Doubles =

Doubles
- 2018 OEC Taipei WTA Challenger

Final
- Champions: (India) Ankita Raina (India) Karman Thandi
- Runners-up: (Russia) Olga Doroshina (Russia) Natela Dzalamidze
- Score: 6–3, 5–7, [12–12], ret.

Events
Singles	Doubles
- OEC Taipei WTA Challenger

Veronika Kudermetova and Aryna Sabalenka were the defending champions, but chose not to participate this year.

Ankita Raina and Karman Thandi won the title against Olga Doroshina and Natela Dzalamidze, when their opponents retired in the match tiebreak because of a hamstring injury suffered by Dzalamidze.

== Seeds ==
1. (Japan) Nao Hibino / (Georgia (country)) Oksana Kalashnikova (first round)
2. (China) Han Xinyun / (Thailand) Luksika Kumkhum (semifinals)
3. (Japan) Misaki Doi / (Montenegro) Danka Kovinić (semifinals)
4. (Russia) Olga Doroshina / (Russia) Natela Dzalamidze (final, retired because of Dzalamidze’s hamstring injury)

== Draw ==
Key

- Q = Qualifier
- WC = Wild card
- LL = Lucky loser
- Alt = Alternate
- ITF = ITF entry
- PR = Protected ranking
- SR = Special ranking
- SE = Special exempt
- JE = Junior exempt
- JR = Junior Accelerator Programme entrant
- CO = College Accelerator Programme entrant
- NG = Next Gen Accelerator Program entrant
- w/o = Walkover
- r = Retired
- d = Defaulted

=== Draw ===
First round
1	(Japan) N Hibino (Georgia (country)) O Kalashnikova	4	2
WC	(Chinese Taipei) Y-h Lee (Chinese Taipei) E-s Liang	6	6
Alt	(Chinese Taipei) J Garland (Chinese Taipei) H-c Lee	3	3
(India) A Raina (India) K Thandi	6	6
3	(Japan) M Doi (Montenegro) D Kovinić	5	6	[10]
(Greece) V Grammatikopoulou (Australia) P Hon	7	3	[4]
(Japan) J Namigata (Thailand) P Plipuech	6	7
(South Korea) J-h Choi (India) P Thombare	4	5
(China) Y Duan (China) Jia Lu	4	7	[10]
(Poland) M Fręch (Netherlands) B Schoofs	6	5	[12]
(Chinese Taipei) S-y Hsieh (China) F Xun	5	2
4	(Russia) O Doroshina (Russia) N Dzalamidze	7	6
(Japan) M Kobori (Japan) A Shimizu	2	6	[10]
PR	(Hong Kong) K-y Ng (China) S Zheng	6	3	[3]
(Chinese Taipei) P-h Chen (Chinese Taipei) F-h Wu	1	7	[4]
2	(China) X Han (Thailand) L Kumkhum	6	5	[10]

Quarterfinals
WC	(Chinese Taipei) Y-h Lee (Chinese Taipei) E-s Liang	6	4	[8]
(India) A Raina (India) K Thandi	4	6	[10]
3	(Japan) M Doi (Montenegro) D Kovinić	6	6
(Japan) J Namigata (Thailand) P Plipuech	3	3
(Poland) M Fręch (Netherlands) B Schoofs	4	1
4	(Russia) O Doroshina (Russia) N Dzalamidze	6	6
(Japan) M Kobori (Japan) A Shimizu	2	4
2	(China) X Han (Thailand) L Kumkhum	6	6

Semifinals
(India) A Raina (India) K Thandi	6^{2}	6	[10]
3	(Japan) M Doi (Montenegro) D Kovinić	7^{7}	4	[8]
4	(Russia) O Doroshina (Russia) N Dzalamidze	6	6
2	(China) X Han (Thailand) L Kumkhum	2	2

Final
(India) A Raina (India) K Thandi	6	5	[12]
4	(Russia) O Doroshina (Russia) N Dzalamidze	3	7	[12]^{r}
