= 2018 Oracle Challenger Series – Newport Beach – Women's singles =

Newport Beach – Women's singles
- 2018 Oracle Challenger Series – Newport Beach

Final
- Champion: (United States) Danielle Collins
- Runner-up: (Russia) Sofya Zhuk
- Score: 2–6, 6–4, 6–3

Events
Singles	men	women
Doubles	men	women
Oracle Challenger Series – Newport Beach	· 2019 →

This was the first edition of the tournament.

Wildcard Danielle Collins won the title, defeating Sofya Zhuk in the final 2–6, 6–4, 6–3.

== Seeds ==
1. (United States) Christina McHale (first round)
2. (United States) Alison Riske (first round)
3. (United States) Taylor Townsend (first round)
4. (Italy) Francesca Schiavone (first round)
5. (United States) Sofia Kenin (first round)
6. (United States) Sachia Vickery (quarterfinals)
7. (Croatia) Ajla Tomljanović (semifinals)
8. (Colombia) Mariana Duque Mariño (first round)

== Draw ==
=== Key ===
- Q = Qualifier
- WC = Wild card
- LL = Lucky loser
- Alt = Alternate
- SE = Special exempt
- PR = Protected ranking
- ITF = ITF entry
- JE = Junior exempt
- w/o = Walkover
- r = Retired
- d = Defaulted
- SR = Special ranking

=== Finals ===
Semifinals
WC	(United States) Danielle Collins	6	6
7	(Croatia) Ajla Tomljanović	4	3
Q	(Russia) Sofya Zhuk	2	7^{9}	6
Q	(Japan) Mayo Hibi	6	6^{7}	4

Final
WC	(United States) Danielle Collins	2	6	6
Q	(Russia) Sofya Zhuk	6	4	3

=== Top half ===
First round
1	(United States) C McHale	2	4
(United States) J Loeb	6	6
WC	(United States) D Collins	6	7^{7}
Q	(Czech Republic) M Bouzková	4	6^{4}
(Switzerland) S Vögele	4	5
WC	(United States) C Liu	6	7
(South Korea) S-j Jang	7^{8}	6
5	(United States) S Kenin	6^{6}	3
4	(Italy) F Schiavone	6	2	1
(Slovakia) AK Schmiedlová	3	6	6
(United States) N Gibbs	6	4	6
(United States) J Boserup	4	6	0
Q	(Chile) D Seguel	3	6	5
(Canada) C Zhao	6	2	7
(Belgium) Y Wickmayer	3	4
7	(Croatia) A Tomljanović	6	6

Second round
(United States) J Loeb	6	0	4
WC	(United States) D Collins	4	6	6
WC	(United States) C Liu	6	5	4
(South Korea) S-j Jang	2	7	6
(Slovakia) AK Schmiedlová	6^{6}	4
(United States) N Gibbs	7^{8}	6
(Canada) C Zhao	1	3
7	(Croatia) A Tomljanović	6	6

Quarterfinals
WC	(United States) D Collins	6	3	6
(South Korea) S-j Jang	0	6	4
(United States) N Gibbs	6	5	2
7	(Croatia) A Tomljanović	4	7	6

Semifinals
WC	(United States) D Collins	6	6
7	(Croatia) A Tomljanović	4	3

=== Bottom half ===
First round
8	(Colombia) M Duque Mariño	3	6^{4}
(United States) K Day	6	7^{7}
WC	(United States) J Cako	1	3
Q	(Russia) S Zhuk	6	6
WC	(United States) V Duval	6	6
(Japan) M Doi	2	1
(Switzerland) J Teichmann	6	6
3	(United States) T Townsend	4	2
6	(United States) S Vickery	6	6
(Russia) E Rodina	0	3
(Sweden) R Peterson	4	6	7
Q	(Bulgaria) E Kostova	6	3	5
(United States) I Falconi	1	0^{r}
Q	(United States) A Anisimova	6	3
Q	(Japan) M Hibi	6	6
2	(United States) A Riske	3	4

Second round
(United States) K Day	6	6^{0}	5
Q	(Russia) S Zhuk	1	7^{7}	7
WC	(United States) V Duval	4	2
(Switzerland) J Teichmann	6	6
6	(United States) S Vickery	6	6
(Sweden) R Peterson	1	4
Q	(United States) A Anisimova	5	6	3
Q	(Japan) M Hibi	7	3	6

Quarterfinals
Q	(Russia) S Zhuk	6	7
(Switzerland) J Teichmann	1	5
6	(United States) S Vickery	4	2
Q	(Japan) M Hibi	6	6

Semifinals
Q	(Russia) S Zhuk	2	7^{9}	6
Q	(Japan) M Hibi	6	6^{7}	4

== Qualifying ==
=== Seeds ===
1. (United States) Caroline Dolehide (qualifying competition)
2. (Czech Republic) Marie Bouzková (qualified)
3. (Russia) Sofya Zhuk (qualified)
4. (United States) Amanda Anisimova (qualified)
5. (Chile) Daniela Seguel (qualified)
6. (United States) Louisa Chirico (first round)
7. (Hungary) Fanny Stollár (first round)
8. (United States) Danielle Lao (qualifying competition)
9. (Bulgaria) Elitsa Kostova (qualified)
10. (France) Amandine Hesse (qualifying competition)
11. (Japan) Mayo Hibi (qualified)
12. (United States) Usue Maitane Arconada (first round)

=== Qualifiers ===
1. (Bulgaria) Elitsa Kostova
2. (Czech Republic) Marie Bouzková
3. (Russia) Sofya Zhuk
4. (United States) Amanda Anisimova
5. (Chile) Daniela Seguel
6. (Japan) Mayo Hibi

=== Qualifying draw ===
==== First qualifier ====
First round
1	(United States) Caroline Dolehide	2	6	6
(United States) Ashley Kratzer	6	3	4
(United States) Emina Bektas	2	7	1
9	(Bulgaria) Elitsa Kostova	6	5	6

Qualifying competition
1	(United States) Caroline Dolehide	4	4
9	(Bulgaria) Elitsa Kostova	6	6

==== Second qualifier ====
First round
2	(Czech Republic) Marie Bouzková	6	6
(United States) Tori Kinard	0	0
(Italy) Cristiana Ferrando	6	6
12	(United States) Usue Maitane Arconada	1	4

Qualifying competition
2	(Czech Republic) Marie Bouzková	6	2	6
(Italy) Cristiana Ferrando	3	6	2

==== Third qualifier ====
First round
3	(Russia) Sofya Zhuk	6	6
(Mexico) Victoria Rodríguez	1	2
WC	(United States) Sabrina Santamaria	6	6
7	(Hungary) Fanny Stollár	1	4

Qualifying competition
3	(Russia) Sofya Zhuk	6	7
WC	(United States) Sabrina Santamaria	4	5

==== Fourth qualifier ====
First round
4	(United States) Amanda Anisimova	6	6
(United States) Hanna Chang	4	4
(Czech Republic) Karolína Muchová	3	5
8	(United States) Danielle Lao	6	7

Qualifying competition
4	(United States) Amanda Anisimova	6	6
8	(United States) Danielle Lao	1	0

==== Fifth qualifier ====
First round
5	(Chile) Daniela Seguel	6	6
(Chile) Alexa Guarachi	3	4
WC	(Canada) Carson Branstine	3	6^{4}
10	(France) Amandine Hesse	6	7^{7}

Qualifying competition
5	(Chile) Daniela Seguel	6	7
10	(France) Amandine Hesse	4	5

==== Sixth qualifier ====
First round
6	(United States) Louisa Chirico	2	6	5
(Mexico) Giuliana Olmos	6	2	7
(Serbia) Jovana Jakšić	1	1
11	(Japan) Mayo Hibi	6	6

Qualifying competition
(Mexico) Giuliana Olmos	6	0	2
11	(Japan) Mayo Hibi	4	6	6
