= Mahak Jain =

Indian tennis player (born 2001)

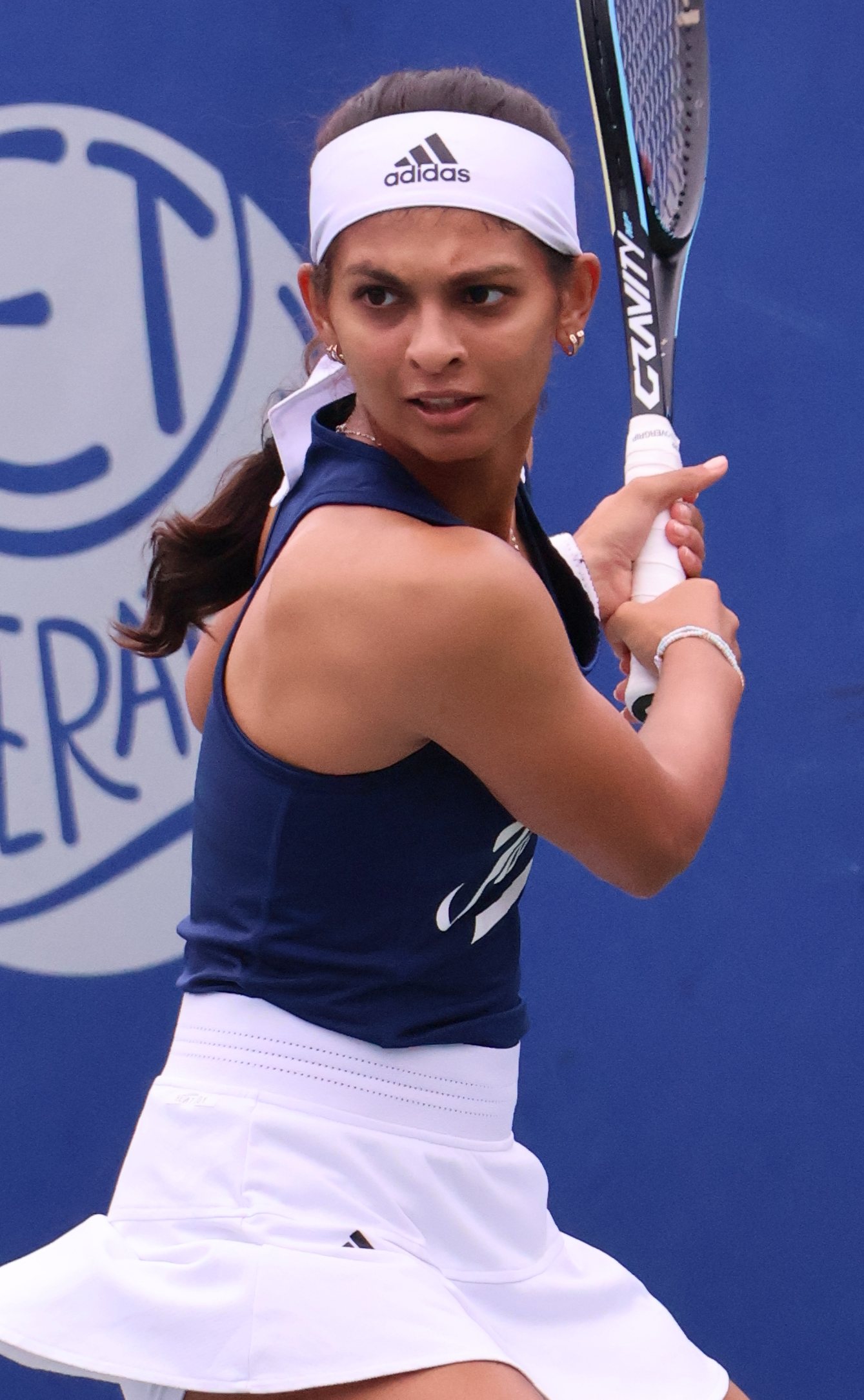
- Jain in 2023
- Country (sports): India
- Residence: Indore, India
- Born: 24 June 2001 (age 24) Bhopal, India
- Height: 5'3
- Plays: Right (two-handed backhand)
- Prize money: $18,257

Singles
- Career record: 54–36
- Career titles: 2 ITF
- Highest ranking: No. 511 (18 February 2019)

Doubles
- Career record: 8–12
- Career titles: 1 ITF
- Highest ranking: No. 820 (14 January 2019)

Mahak Jain (born 24 June 2001) is an Indian former professional tennis player. She plays college tennis for the Georgia Tech Yellow Jackets.

Mahak has a career-high singles ranking by the Women's Tennis Association (WTA) of 511, achieved on 18 February 2019. Over her career, she won two singles titles and one doubles title on the ITF Women's Circuit. Her last match on the circuit was in December 2019.

On the ITF Junior Circuit, Mahak has a career-high combined ranking of 29, achieved on 5 June 2017.

Mahak made her Fed Cup debut for India in 2019. It has been her sole match in Fed Cup competitions.

== ITF Circuit finals ==
Legend
$100,000 tournaments
$80,000 tournaments
$60,000 tournaments
$25,000 tournaments
$15,000 tournaments

=== Singles: 5 (2 titles, 3 runner–ups) ===
Result	W–L	Date	Tournament	Tier	Surface	Opponent	Score
Loss	0–1	Feb 2017	ITF Gwalior, India	15,000	Hard	(India) Zeel Desai	3–6, 5–7
Loss	0–2	Jun 2017	ITF Aurangabad, India	15,000	Clay	(India) Rutuja Bhosale	4–6, 4–6
Loss	0–3	Jul 2018	ITF Jakarta, Indonesia	15,000	Hard	(Netherlands) Arianne Hartono	4–6, 1–6
Win	1–3	Aug 2019	ITF Nairobi, Kenya	15,000	Hard	(Burundi) Sada Nahimana	6–1, 6–4
Win	2–3	Aug 2019	ITF Nairobi, Kenya	15,000	Hard	(Burundi) Sada Nahimana	6–1, 6–1

=== Doubles: 1 (title) ===
Result	Date	Tournament	Tier	Surface	Partner	Opponents	Score
Win	Aug 2019	ITF Nairobi, Kenya	15,000	Hard	(India) Sathwika Sama	(India) Sravya Shivani Chilakalapudi (India) Snehal Mane	6–4, 6–2

== Fed Cup participation ==
=== Singles ===
Edition	Stage	Date	Location	Against	Surface	Opponent	W/L	Score
2019 Fed Cup; Asia/Oceania Zone Group I	P/O	9 February 2019	Astana, Kazakhstan	(South Korea) Korea	Hard (i)	(South Korea) Kim Na-ri	L	2–6, 6–3, 1–6
