= Olga Doroshina =

Russian tennis player (born 1994)

Olga Doroshina Ольга Дорошина
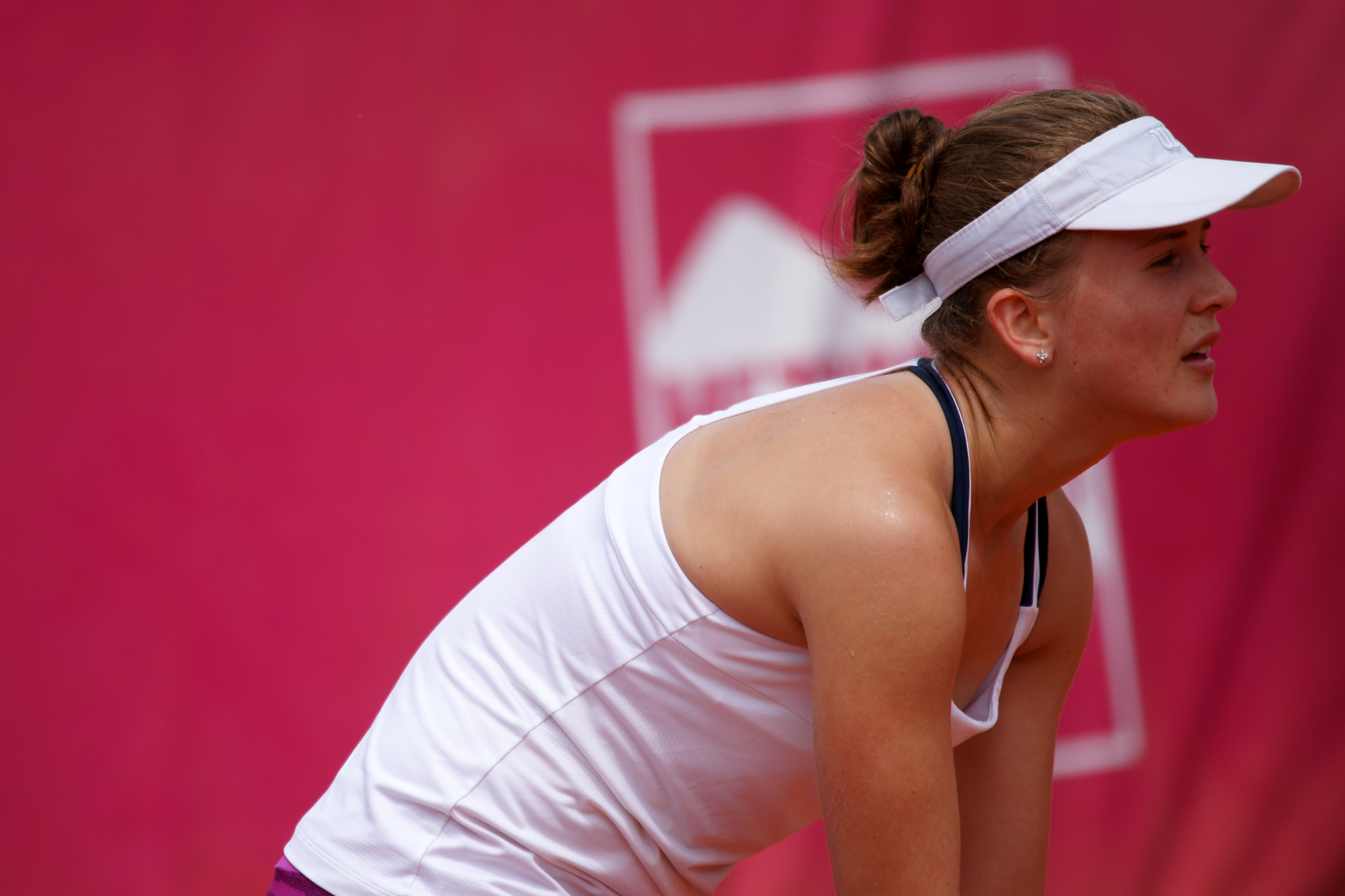
- Olga Doroshina at the 2015 Cagnes-sur-Mer Open
- Full name: Olga Vladimirovna Doroshina
- Country (sports): Russia
- Born: 24 June 1994 (age 32) Moscow
- Plays: Left-handed (two-handed backhand)
- Prize money: $133,941

Singles
- Career record: 274–172
- Career titles: 8 ITF
- Highest ranking: No. 221 (24 September 2018)

Doubles
- Career record: 185–92
- Career titles: 26 ITF
- Highest ranking: No. 134 (1 April 2019)

Olga Vladimirovna Doroshina (Russian: Ольга Владимировна Дорошина; born 24 June 1994) is a Russian former tennis player.

On 24 September 2018, she achieved a career-high singles ranking of world No. 221. On 1 April 2019, she peaked at No. 134 in the WTA doubles rankings.

Doroshina reached one WTA 125 doubles final at the 2018 OEC Taipei WTA Challenger. Partnering Natela Dzalamidze, they lost to Ankita Raina and Karman Thandi by retirement in the deciding champions tiebreak because of a hamstring injury suffered by Dzalamidze.

== WTA Challenger finals ==
=== Doubles: 1 (runner-up) ===
Result	Date	Tournament	Surface	Partner	Opponents	Score
Loss	Nov 2018	Taipei Open, Taiwan	Carpet (i)	(Russia) Natela Dzalamidze	(India) Ankita Raina (India) Karman Thandi	3–6, 7–5, [12–12] ret.

== ITF Circuit finals ==
$100,000 tournaments
$60,000 tournaments
$25,000 tournaments
$10/15,000 tournaments

=== Singles: 16 (8 titles, 8 runner–ups) ===
Result	W–L	Date	Tournament	Tier	Surface	Opponent	Score
Loss	0–1	Oct 2013	ITF Dubrovnik, Croatia	10,000	Clay	(Ukraine) Alyona Sotnikova	6–7^{(6)}, 6–4, 6–7^{(5)}
Win	1–1	Mar 2014	ITF Astana, Kazakhstan	10,000	Hard (i)	(Russia) Veronika Kudermetova	6–7^{(5)}, 6–4, 7–6^{(6)}
Loss	1–2	Mar 2014	ITF Astana, Kazakhstan	10,000	Hard (i)	(Russia) Veronika Kudermetova	6–7^{(2)}, 6–7^{(3)}
Loss	1–3	Apr 2014	ITF Dijon, France	15,000	Hard (i)	(Netherlands) Michaëlla Krajicek	6–3, 5–7, 2–6
Loss	1–4	May 2014	ITF Antalya, Turkey	10,000	Hard	(Hungary) Anna Bondár	3–6, 2–6
Win	2–4	Oct 2015	ITF Tel Aviv, Israel	10,000	Hard	(Israel) Deniz Khazaniuk	7–6^{(4)}, 6–3
Loss	2–5	Nov 2015	ITF Ramat Gan, Israel	10,000	Hard	(Czech Republic) Barbora Štefková	1–6, 4–6
Loss	2–6	Dec 2015	ITF Ramat Gan, Israel	10,000	Hard	(Israel) Deniz Khazaniuk	6–7^{(6)}, 3–6
Win	3–6	Jan 2016	ITF Astana, Kazakhstan	10,000	Hard (i)	(Russia) Alina Silich	6–2, 6–4
Loss	3–7	Aug 2016	ITF Nonthaburi, Thailand	25,000	Hard	(Japan) Akiko Omae	6–7^{(6)}, 4–6
Win	4–7	Dec 2016	ITF Hong Kong	10,000	Hard	(Thailand) Nudnida Luangnam	2–6, 6–4, 6–2
Win	5–7	Feb 2017	ITF Almaty, Kazakhstan	15,000	Hard (i)	(Russia) Polina Monova	4–1 ret.
Win	6–7	Dec 2017	ITF Indore, India	15,000	Hard	(Montenegro) Ana Veselinović	7–6^{(6)}, 6–2
Loss	6–8	Dec 2017	ITF Solapur, India	15,000	Hard	(Thailand) Bunyawi Thamchaiwat	6–7^{(2)}, 3–6
Win	7–8	Mar 2018	ITF Moscow, Russia	15,000	Hard (i)	(Russia) Daria Kruzhkova	6–3, 6–3
Win	8–8	Apr 2018	ITF Qarshi, Uzbekistan	25,000	Hard	(Russia) Anastasia Gasanova	6–2, 7–5

=== Doubles: 37 (26–11) ===
Outcome	No.	Date	Tournament	Surface	Partnering	Opponents	Score
Winner	1.	31 August 2012	ITF St. Petersburg, Russia	Clay	(Russia) Yuliya Kalabina	(Belarus) Darya Lebesheva (Russia) Julia Valetova	6–0, 6–4
Runner-up	1.	19 January 2013	ITF Stuttgart, Germany	Hard (i)	(Russia) Julia Valetova	(Switzerland) Viktorija Golubic (Germany) Julia Kimmelmann	4–6, 1–6
Runner-up	2.	20 April 2013	ITF Sharm El Sheikh, Egypt	Hard	(Brazil) Laura Pigossi	(Poland) Olga Brózda (Poland) Natalia Kołat	3–6, 1–6
Runner-up	3.	27 April 2013	ITF Sharm El Sheikh	Hard	(Brazil) Laura Pigossi	(Romania) Elena-Teodora Cadar (Spain) Arabela Fernández Rabener	4–6, 3–6
Winner	2.	28 June 2013	ITF Kristinehamn, Sweden	Clay	(Kazakhstan) Anna Danilina	(United States) Julia Cohen (France) Alizé Lim	7–5, 6–3
Winner	3.	12 July 2013	ITF Turin, Italy	Hard	(Italy) Camilla Rosatello	(Italy) Maria Masini (Japan) Yuka Mori	6–2, 6–1
Runner-up	4.	15 November 2013	ITF Minsk, Belarus	Hard (i)	(Kazakhstan) Anna Danilina	(Belarus) Ilona Kremen (Belarus) Aliaksandra Sasnovich	6–7^{(3)}, 0–6
Winner	4.	7 March 2014	ITF Astana, Kazakhstan	Hard (i)	(Kazakhstan) Anna Danilina	(Kazakhstan) Alexandra Grinchishina (Ukraine) Kateryna Sliusar	6–3, 7–6^{(4)}
Winner	5.	16 August 2014	ITF Leipzig, Germany	Clay	(Switzerland) Conny Perrin	(Ukraine) Diana Bogoliy (Russia) Polina Leykina	7–5, 6–4
Winner	6.	7 November 2014	ITF Équeurdreville, France	Hard (i)	(Belarus) Lidziya Marozava	(France) Fanny Caramaro (France) Alice Ramé	6–3, 6–3
Runner-up	5.	14 November 2014	ITF Minsk, Belarus	Hard (i)	(Georgia (country)) Sofia Shapatava	(Belarus) Lidziya Marozava (Belarus) Ilona Kremen	3–6, 4–6
Runner-up	6.	21 March 2015	ITF Solarino, Italy	Hard	(Georgia (country)) Sofia Shapatava	(Germany) Laura Schäder (Netherlands) Janneke Wikkerink	4–6, 6–2, [7–10]
Runner-up	7.	27 March 2015	ITF Solarino, Italy	Hard	(Hungary) Anna Bondár	(Italy) Francesca Palmigiano (Switzerland) Lisa Sabino	3–6, 6–4, [3–10]
Winner	7.	10 April 2015	ITF Dijon, France	Hard (i)	(Belarus) Lidziya Marozava	(Germany) Nicola Geuer (Germany) Laura Schaeder	4–6, 6–2, [10–2]
Runner-up	8.	19 September 2015	ITF Port El Kantaoui, Tunisia	Hard	(Russia) Margarita Lazareva	(France) Manon Arcangioli (Belarus) Sadafmoh Tolibova	6–3, 3–6, [6–10]
Winner	8.	26 September 2015	ITF Port El Kantaoui	Hard	(Russia) Yana Sizikova	(Germany) Lisa-Marie Maetschke (Belarus) Anastasiya Shleptsova	6–2, 6–2
Winner	9.	17 October 2015	ITF Tel Aviv, Israel	Hard	(Israel) Vlada Ekshibarova	(United Kingdom) Lucy Brown (France) Amandine Cazeaux	4–6, 6–4, [10–8]
Winner	10.	28 November 2015	ITF Ramat Gan, Israel	Hard	(Israel) Vlada Ekshibarova	(United States) Alexandra Morozova (Czech Republic) Barbora Štefková	6–2, 6–2
Winner	11.	22 January 2016	ITF Astana, Kazakhstan	Hard (i)	(Russia) Yana Sizikova	(Kazakhstan) Alexandra Grincishina (Netherlands) Erika Vogelsang	6–4, 6–0
Winner	12.	19 March 2016	ITF Antalya, Turkey	Hard	(Ukraine) Anastasiya Vasylyeva	(Czech Republic) Natálie Novotná (Czech Republic) Markéta Vondroušová	6–2, 6–1
Winner	13.	6 May 2016	ITF Khimki, Russia	Hard (i)	(Russia) Alena Tarasova	(Russia) Polina Monova (Russia) Yana Sizikova	6–2, 6–4
Winner	14.	1 July 2016	ITF Kazan, Russia	Clay	(Russia) Yana Sizikova	(Russia) Amina Anshba (Russia) Angelina Gabueva	6–4, 6–7^{(8)}, [10–5]
Winner	15.	5 August 2016	ITF Nonthaburi, Thailand	Hard	(Russia) Yana Sizikova	(Japan) Akiko Omae (Japan) Miyabi Inoue	4–6, 6–3, [11–9]
Winner	16.	3 February 2017	ITF Almaty, Kazakhstan	Hard (i)	(Russia) Polina Monova	(Austria) Pia König (Philippines) Katharina Lehnert	6–1, 6–2
Winner	17.	11 March 2017	ITF Sharm El Sheikh, Egypt	Hard	(Russia) Polina Monova	(Slovakia) Tereza Mihalíková (Bulgaria) Julia Terziyska	w/o
Winner	18.	18 March 2017	ITF Sharm El Sheikh	Hard	(Russia) Polina Monova	(Russia) Yana Sizikova (Ukraine) Valeriya Strakhova	6–1, 6–1
Winner	19.	8 April 2017	ITF Istanbul, Turkey	Hard (i)	(Russia) Polina Monova	(United Kingdom) Freya Christie (United Kingdom) Laura Robson	6–3, 6–2
Winner	20.	28 April 2017	ITF Qarshi, Uzbekistan	Hard	(Russia) Polina Monova	(Uzbekistan) Nigina Abduraimova (Montenegro) Ana Veselinović	7–5, 6–2
Winner	21.	2 June 2017	ITF Andijan, Uzbekistan	Hard	(Russia) Polina Monova	(Uzbekistan) Akgul Amanmuradova (Ukraine) Valeriya Strakhova	6–2, 6–0
Winner	22.	9 June 2017	ITF Namangan, Uzbekistan	Hard	(Russia) Polina Monova	(Uzbekistan) Nigina Abduraimova (Russia) Ksenia Lykina	6–2, 7–6^{(8)}
Winner	23.	22 October 2017	ITF Óbidos, Portugal	Carpet	(Russia) Yana Sizikova	(Turkey) Berfu Cengiz (United Kingdom) Katie Swan	6–2, 6–2
Winner	24.	27 October 2017	ITF Óbidos, Portugal	Carpet	(Russia) Yana Sizikova	(Belarus) Lizaveta Hancharova (Italy) Dalila Spiteri	6–0, 6–2
Runner-up	9.	3 March 2018	ITF Moscow, Russia	Hard (i)	(Russia) Daria Kruzhkova	(Russia) Anastasia Kharitonova (Russia) Daria Nazarkina	7–6^{(5)}, 6–7^{(2)}, [19–21]
Runner-up	10.	14 April 2018	Lale Cup Istanbul, Turkey	Hard	(Russia) Anastasia Potapova	(Turkey) Ayla Aksu (United Kingdom) Harriet Dart	4–6, 6–7^{(3)}
Winner	25.	5 May 2018	ITF Khimki, Russia	Hard (i)	(Russia) Anastasiya Komardina	(Russia) Veronika Pepelyaeva (Russia) Anastasia Tikhonova	6–1, 6–2
Winner	26.	16 March 2019	ITF Kazan, Russia	Hard (i)	(Russia) Polina Monova	(United Kingdom) Freya Christie (Russia) Valeria Savinykh	6–4, 6–7^{(4)}, [11–9]
Runner-up	11.	21 December 2019	ITF Navi Mumbai, India	Hard	(Russia) Shalimar Talbi	(Chinese Taipei) Lee Pei-chi (Chinese Taipei) Wu Fang-hsien	2–6, 2–6
