= Karman Thandi =

Indian tennis player (born 1998)

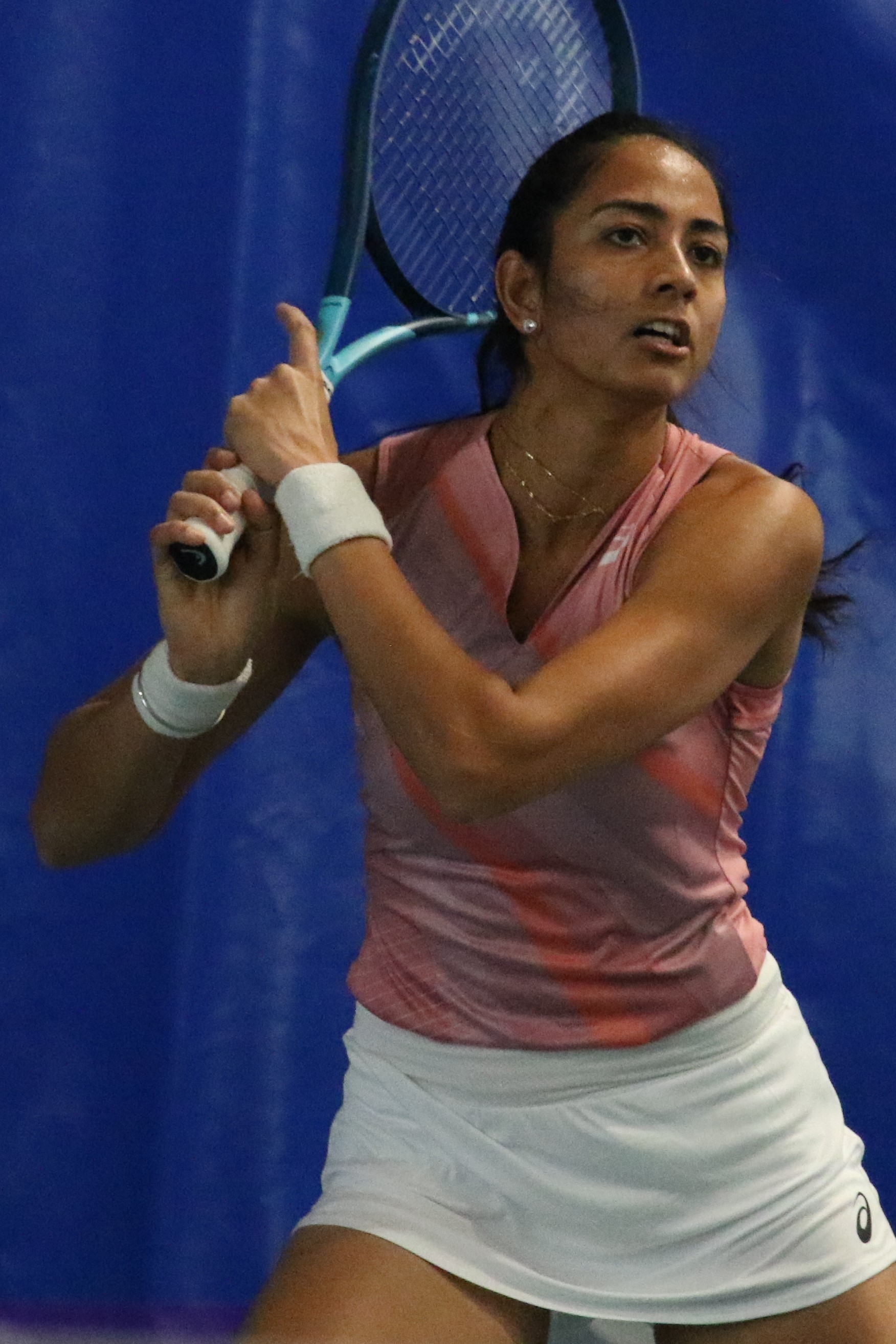
- Thandi at the 2021 ITF Poitiers
- Full name: Karman Kaur Thandi
- Country (sports): India
- Residence: New Delhi, India
- Born: 16 June 1998 (age 28) New Delhi
- Height: 1.83 m (6 ft 0 in)
- Plays: Right (two-handed backhand)
- Prize money: $222,875

Singles
- Career record: 200–139
- Career titles: 4 ITF
- Highest ranking: No. 196 (20 August 2018)
- Current ranking: No. 1288 (10 August 2026)

Grand Slam singles results
- Australian Open: Q1 (2019, 2021)
- French Open: Q1 (2026)
- US Open: Q1 (2023)

Doubles
- Career record: 75–61
- Career titles: 1 WTA Challenger, 4 ITF
- Highest ranking: No. 180 (14 January 2019)
- Current ranking: No. 1191 (10 August 2026)

Team competitions
- Fed Cup: 5–8
- Last updated on: 23 August 2026.

Karman Kaur Thandi (born 16 June 1998) is an Indian professional tennis player. She is a former Indian number one in singles.

Thandi's career-high WTA rankings was No. 196 in singles, as of 20 August 2018, and No. 180 in doubles, as of 14 January 2019.

== Career ==
She started playing tennis at the age of eight.

Thandi is the sixth Indian female tennis player to enter the top 200 of the WTA rankings, after Nirupama Sanjeev, Sania Mirza, Shikha Uberoi, Sunitha Rao and Ankita Raina.

Thandi has won four singles titles and four doubles titles on the ITF Circuit - the maiden singles title in $25k Hong Kong tournament on 23 June 2018, and the doubles titles in 2017 in Heraklion, and two in 2015 in Gulbarga. On the ITF Junior Circuit, she achieved a career-high ranking of 32 in January 2016. Additionally, she also made it to the semifinals in two other tournaments in China.

Since 2017, she has represented India in the Fed Cup, with a career win–loss record of 3–7 in singles and of 2–1 in doubles.

Thandi won her first WTA 125 doubles title at the 2018 Taipei Challenger. Partnering Ankita Raina, they defeated Olga Doroshina and Natela Dzalamidze, when their opponents retired in the deciding champions tiebreak because of a hamstring injury suffered by Dzalamidze.

She participated in the 2018 Asian Games, with Divij Sharan in mixed-doubles event. They defeated Filipino pairing of Marian Capadocia and Alberto Lim jr in their first match in the Games. But the pair lost in the third round.

== Personal life ==
In 2023, Thandi married Indian national hockey player Gurjant Singh.

== Performance timelines ==
Key
W	F	SF	QF	#R	RR	Q#	DNQ	A	NH

(W) winner; (F) finalist; (SF) semifinalist; (QF) quarterfinalist; (#R) rounds 4, 3, 2, 1; (RR) round-robin stage; (Q#) qualification round; (DNQ) did not qualify; (A) absent; (NH) not held; (SR) strike rate (events won / competed); (W–L) win–loss record.
To avoid confusion and double counting, these charts are updated at the conclusion of a tournament or when the player's participation has ended.
- Sourced from WTA

Only main-draw results in WTA Tour, Grand Slam tournaments, Fed Cup/Billie Jean King Cup and Olympic Games are included in win–loss records.

=== Singles ===
Current through the 2022 Chennai Open.

Tournament	2018	2019	2020	2021	2022	SR	W–L
Grand Slam tournaments
Australian Open	A	Q1	A	Q1	A	0 / 0	0–0
French Open	A	A	A	A	A	0 / 0	0–0
Wimbledon	A	A	NH	A	A	0 / 0	0–0
US Open	A	A	A	A	A	0 / 0	0–0
Win–loss	0–0	0–0	0–0	0–0	0–0	0 / 0	0–0
WTA 1000
Miami Open	A	Q1	NH	A	A	0–0	0–0
Career statistics
Tournaments	2	0	0	0	1	Career total: 3	
Overall win-loss	1–2	0–0	0–0	0–1	1–1	0 / 3	2–4
Year-end ranking		591	621	503	268	$110,750	

== WTA 125 finals ==
=== Doubles: 1 (title) ===
Result	Date	Tournament	Surface	Partner	Opponents	Score
Win	Nov 2018	Taipei Open, Taiwan	Hard	(India) Ankita Raina	(Russia) Olga Doroshina (Russia) Natela Dzalamidze	6–3, 5–7, [12–12] ret.

== ITF Circuit finals ==
=== Singles: 13 (4 titles, 9 runner-ups) ===
Legend
$60,000 tournaments (2–1)
$25,000 tournaments (2–6)
$10,000 tournaments (0–2)

Result	W–L	Date	Tournament	Tier	Surface	Opponent	Score
Loss	0–1	Dec 2015	ITF Indore, India	10,000	Hard	(Ukraine) Anastasiya Vasylyeva	5–7, 6–2, 2–6
Loss	0–2	Oct 2016	ITF Hua Hin, Thailand	10,000	Hard	(China) Guo Hanyu	3–6, 3–6
Loss	0–3	Jul 2017	ITF Naiman, China	25,000	Hard	(China) Lu Jingjing	2–6, 1–6
Loss	0–4	Nov 2017	Pune Championships, India	25,000	Hard	(Romania) Jaqueline Cristian	3–6, 6–1, 0–6
Win	1–4	Jun 2018	ITF Hong Kong, China	25,000	Hard	(China) Lu Jiajing	6–1, 6–2
Loss	1–5	Oct 2018	ITF Nanning, China	25,000	Hard	(China) Han Xinyun	4–6, 6–2, 4–6
Loss	1–6	Dec 2018	Pune Championships, India	25,000	Hard	(Slovenia) Tamara Zidanšek	3–6, 4–6
Loss	1–7	Nov 2019	ITF Bhopal, India	W25	Hard	(Japan) Chihiro Muramatsu	1–6, 1–3 ret.
Loss	1–8	Nov 2021	Internazionali Val Gardena, Italy	W25	Hard (i)	(Switzerland) Susan Bandecchi	4–6, 4–6
Win	2–8	Jun 2022	ITF Gurugram, India	W25	Hard	(Belgium) Sofia Costoulas	6–4, 2–6, 6–1
Win	3–8	Oct 2022	Challenger de Saguenay, Canada	W60	Hard (i)	(Canada) Katherine Sebov	3–6, 6–4, 6–3
Loss	3–9	Jun 2023	ITF Sumter, United States	W60	Hard	(Ukraine) Yuliia Starodubtseva	7–6^{(5)}, 5–7, 4–6
Win	4–9	Jul 2023	Evansville Classic, United States	W60	Hard	(Ukraine) Yuliia Starodubtseva	7–5, 4–6, 6–1

=== Doubles: 9 (4 titles, 5 runner-ups) ===
Legend
$60,000 tournaments (0–1)
$25,000 tournaments (1–2)
$10/15,000 tournaments (3–2)

Result	W–L	Date	Tournament	Tier	Surface	Partner	Opponents	Score
Loss	0–1	May 2015	ITF Nashik, India	10,000	Clay	(India) Riya Bhatia	(India) Sowjanya Bavisetti (India) Rishika Sunkara	6–7^{(5)}, 2–6
Win	1–1	Nov 2015	ITF Gulbarga, India	10,000	Hard	(India) Dhruthi Tatachar Venugopal	(India) Prerna Bhambri (India) Kanika Vaidya	1–6, 6–3, [10–7]
Win	2–1	Nov 2015	ITF Gulbarga, India	10,000	Hard	(India) Dhruthi Tatachar Venugopal	(India) Nidhi Chilumula (India) Eetee Maheta	6–4, 6–7^{(5)}, [10–7]
Loss	2–2	Dec 2015	ITF Indore, India	10,000	Hard	(India) Dhruthi Tatachar Venugopal	(Ukraine) Veronika Kapshay (Ukraine) Anastasiya Vasylyeva	1–6, 3–6
Win	3–2	Mar 2017	ITF Heraklion, Greece	15,000	Clay	(Austria) Mira Antonitsch	(Ukraine) Olga Ianchuk (Greece) Despina Papamichail	6–0, 6–3
Loss	3–3	Sep 2017	ITF Lubbock, United States	25,000	Hard	(Montenegro) Ana Veselinović	(United States) Victoria Duval (Russia) Alisa Kleybanova	6–2, 4–6, [8–10]
Loss	3–4	Oct 2017	ITF Cherbourg-en-Cotentin, France	25,000	Hard (i)	(United Kingdom) Samantha Murray	(France) Manon Arcangioli (France) Shérazad Reix	1–3 ret.
Win	4–4	Nov 2018	Pune Championships, India	25,000	Hard	(India) Ankita Raina	(Bulgaria) Aleksandrina Naydenova (Slovenia) Tamara Zidanšek	6–2, 6–7^{(5)}, [11–9]
Loss	4–5	Jul 2023	ITF Saskatoon, Canada	W60	Hard	(Canada) Stacey Fung	(United States) Abigail Rencheli (United States) Alana Smith	6–4, 4–6, [7–10]

== Fed Cup/Billie Jean King Cup participation ==
=== Singles (0–2) ===
Edition	Stage	Date	Location	Against	Surface	Opponent	W/L	Score
2019	Z1 R/R	7 Feb 2019	Astana (KAZ)	Thailand	Hard (i)	Nudnida Luangnam	L	2–6, 6–3, 3–6
2019	Z1 R/R	8 Feb 2019	Astana (KAZ)	Kazakhstan	Hard (i)	Zarina Diyas	L	3–6, 2–6

=== Doubles (1–0) ===
Edition	Stage	Date	Location	Against	Surface	Partner	Opponents	W/L	Score
2019	Z1 R/R	7 Feb 2019	Astana (KAZ)	Thailand	Hard (i)	Ankita Raina	Nudnida Luangnam; Peangtarn Plipuech	W	6–4, 6–7^{(6–8)}, 7–5
