= 2019 Oracle Challenger Series – Indian Wells – Men's singles =

Oracle Challenger Series

Indian Wells – Men's singles
- 2019 Oracle Challenger Series – Indian Wells

Final
- Champion: (United Kingdom) Kyle Edmund
- Runner-up: (Russia) Andrey Rublev
- Score: 6–3, 6–2

Events
| Singles | men | women |
| Doubles | men | women |
| ← 2018 · | Oracle Challenger Series – Indian Wells | · 2020 → |

Martin Kližan was the defending champion but chose not to defend his title.

Kyle Edmund won the title after defeating Andrey Rublev 6–3, 6–2 in the final.

== Seeds ==
All seeds receive a bye into the second round.

1. (United Kingdom) Kyle Edmund (champion)
2. (Serbia) Filip Krajinović (third round)
3. (Moldova) Radu Albot (withdrew)
4. (Russia) Evgeny Donskoy (third round)
5. (South Africa) Lloyd Harris (semifinals)
6. (Uzbekistan) Denis Istomin (second round)
7. (Russia) Andrey Rublev (final)
8. (Germany) Yannick Maden (quarterfinals)
9. (United States) Jared Donaldson (second round)
10. (Switzerland) Henri Laaksonen (second round)
11. (Canada) Peter Polansky (third round)
12. (Serbia) Miomir Kecmanović (second round)
13. (Australia) Alex Bolt (quarterfinals)
14. (Chinese Taipei) Jason Jung (quarterfinals)
15. (Slovakia) Lukáš Lacko (second round)
16. (Czech Republic) Lukáš Rosol (third round)

== Draw ==
=== Key ===
- Q = Qualifier
- WC = Wild card
- LL = Lucky loser
- Alt = Alternate
- SE = Special exempt
- PR = Protected ranking
- ITF = ITF entry
- JE = Junior exempt
- w/o = Walkover
- r = Retired
- d = Defaulted
- SR = Special ranking

=== Finals ===
Quarterfinals
1/WC | (United Kingdom) Kyle Edmund | 3 | 6 | 6
8 | (Germany) Yannick Maden | 6 | 0 | 3
(Italy) Salvatore Caruso | 6^{4} | 3
5 | (South Africa) Lloyd Harris | 7^{7} | 6
7 | (Russia) Andrey Rublev | 6 | 6
13 | (Australia) Alex Bolt | 4 | 3
(United Kingdom) Dan Evans | 6 | 6
14 | (Chinese Taipei) Jason Jung | 4 | 4

Semifinals
1/WC | (United Kingdom) Kyle Edmund | 6 | 4 | 6
5 | (South Africa) Lloyd Harris | 2 | 6 | 1
7 | (Russia) Andrey Rublev | 6 | 6
(United Kingdom) Dan Evans | 2 | 2

Final
1/WC | (United Kingdom) Kyle Edmund | 6 | 6
7 | (Russia) Andrey Rublev | 3 | 2

=== Top half ===
==== Section 1 ====
First round
(Germany) D Köpfer | 6 | 5 | 2
(Spain) T Robredo | 4 | 7 | 6
WC | (United States) Z Khan | 6 | 2 | 2
(Japan) Yo Watanuki | 3 | 6 | 6
(Barbados) D King | 4 | 3
(Poland) K Majchrzak | 6 | 6
Q | (United States) Mi Redlicki | 3 | 6^{3}
(United States) E Escobedo | 6 | 7^{7}

Second round
1/WC | (United Kingdom) K Edmund | 6 | 6
(Spain) T Robredo | 4 | 4
(Japan) Yo Watanuki | 6^{5} | 6^{6}
16 | (Czech Republic) L Rosol | 7^{7} | 7^{8}
12 | (Serbia) M Kecmanović | 2 | 3
(Poland) K Majchrzak | 6 | 6
(United States) E Escobedo | 6^{3} | 3
8 | (Germany) Y Maden | 7^{7} | 6

Third round
1/WC | (United Kingdom) K Edmund | 6 | 6
16 | (Czech Republic) L Rosol | 3 | 4
(Poland) K Majchrzak | 2 | 5
8 | (Germany) Y Maden | 6 | 7

Quarterfinals
1/WC | (United Kingdom) K Edmund | 3 | 6 | 6
8 | (Germany) Y Maden | 6 | 0 | 3

==== Section 2 ====
First round
WC | (United States) J Brooksby | 6 | 2 | 2
Q | (United States) U Blanch | 4 | 6 | 6
(Italy) S Caruso | 7 | 6
(Ecuador) R Quiroz | 5 | 2
Alt | (United States) T-S Kwiatkowski | 6 | 1 | 6^{4}
(United States) D Young | 4 | 6 | 7^{7}
(United States) M Giron | 5 | 3
(United States) C Eubanks | 7 | 6

Second round
LL | (United States) Ma Redlicki | 6 | 3 | 6
Q | (United States) U Blanch | 3 | 6 | 1
(Italy) S Caruso | 4 | 6 | 6
15 | (Slovakia) L Lacko | 6 | 3 | 1
10 | (Switzerland) H Laaksonen | 5 | 6 | 4
(United States) D Young | 7 | 3 | 6
(United States) C Eubanks | 6^{5} | 7^{7} | 0
5 | (South Africa) L Harris | 7^{7} | 6^{4} | 6

Third round
LL | (United States) Ma Redlicki | 6^{8} | 6 | 6^{1}
(Italy) S Caruso | 7^{10} | 2 | 7^{7}
(United States) D Young | 4 | 2
5 | (South Africa) L Harris | 6 | 6

Quarterfinals
(Italy) S Caruso | 6^{4} | 3
5 | (South Africa) L Harris | 7^{7} | 6

=== Bottom half ===
==== Section 3 ====
First round
(Australia) J-P Smith | 6^{2} | 6 | 6
(United States) N Rubin | 7^{7} | 3 | 4
(United States) C Harrison | 6 | 4 | 6
(United States) T Smyczek | 4 | 6 | 3
(Serbia) P Krstin | 6 | 6
(Belgium) R Bemelmans | 3 | 4
(Italy) A Arnaboldi | 4 | 2
(Estonia) J Zopp | 6 | 6

Second round
7 | (Russia) A Rublev | 6 | 7
(Australia) J-P Smith | 2 | 5
(United States) C Harrison | 4 | 6 | 6^{4}
11 | (Canada) P Polansky | 6 | 3 | 7^{7}
13 | (Australia) A Bolt | 6 | 6
(Serbia) P Krstin | 3 | 4
(Estonia) J Zopp | 3 | 6^{3}
4 | (Russia) E Donskoy | 6 | 7^{7}

Third round
7 | (Russia) A Rublev | 6 | 7
11 | (Canada) P Polansky | 2 | 5
13 | (Australia) A Bolt | 6 | 3 | 7
4 | (Russia) E Donskoy | 3 | 6 | 5

Quarterfinals
7 | (Russia) A Rublev | 6 | 6
13 | (Australia) A Bolt | 4 | 3

==== Section 4 ====
First round
WC | (United States) M Cressy | 4 | 5
(United Kingdom) D Evans | 6 | 7
(Colombia) S Giraldo | 7 | 5 | 6
(United States) D Novikov | 5 | 7 | 2
(Serbia) N Milojević | 5 | 4
(United States) M Krueger | 7 | 6
WC | (United States) B Nakashima | 1 | 4
(United States) JC Aragone | 6 | 6

Second round
6 | (Uzbekistan) D Istomin | 4 | 4
(United Kingdom) D Evans | 6 | 6
(Colombia) S Giraldo | 6 | 2 | 6
9 | (United States) J Donaldson | 2 | 6 | 4
14 | (Chinese Taipei) J Jung | 6 | 6
(United States) M Krueger | 1 | 4
(United States) JC Aragone | 2 | 6 | 5
2 | (Serbia) F Krajinović | 6 | 3 | 7

Third round
(United Kingdom) D Evans | 6 | 6
(Colombia) S Giraldo | 1 | 2
14 | (Chinese Taipei) J Jung | 7 | 6
2 | (Serbia) F Krajinović | 5 | 3

Quarterfinals
(United Kingdom) D Evans | 6 | 6
14 | (Chinese Taipei) J Jung | 4 | 4
