= 2019 Oracle Challenger Series – Indian Wells – Men's doubles =

Indian Wells – Men's doubles
- 2019 Oracle Challenger Series – Indian Wells

Final
- Champions: (United States) JC Aragone (United States) Marcos Giron
- Runners-up: (Barbados) Darian King (United States) Hunter Reese
- Score: 6–4, 6–4

Events
Singles	men	women
Doubles	men	women
← 2018 ·	Oracle Challenger Series – Indian Wells	· 2020 →

Austin Krajicek and Jackson Withrow were the defending champions but only Withrow chose to defend his title, partnering Mitchell Krueger. Withrow lost in the first round to Lloyd Harris and Ruan Roelofse.

JC Aragone and Marcos Giron won the title after defeating Darian King and Hunter Reese 6–4, 6–4 in the final.

== Seeds ==
1. (United States) Robert Galloway / (United States) Nathaniel Lammons (first round)
2. (Australia) Matt Reid / (Australia) John-Patrick Smith (semifinals)
3. (United States) Nathan Pasha / (United States) Donald Young (first round)
4. (Barbados) Darian King / (United States) Hunter Reese (final)

== Draw ==
=== Key ===
- Q = Qualifier
- WC = Wild card
- LL = Lucky loser
- Alt = Alternate
- SE = Special exempt
- PR = Protected ranking
- ITF = ITF entry
- JE = Junior exempt
- w/o = Walkover
- r = Retired
- d = Defaulted
- SR = Special ranking

First round
1	(United States) R Galloway (United States) N Lammons	6	6^{5}	[6]
(Australia) A Bolt (Netherlands) S Verbeek	4	7^{7}	[10]
WC	(United States) JC Aragone (United States) M Giron	4	6	[10]
(Uzbekistan) D Istomin (Serbia) P Krstin	6	4	[7]
3/WC	(United States) N Pasha (United States) D Young	6	5	[4]
(Serbia) M Kecmanović (Germany) D Köpfer	1	7	[10]
(South Africa) L Harris (South Africa) R Roelofse	6	6
(United States) M Krueger (United States) J Withrow	2	0
WC	(United States) C Eubanks (United States) T-S Kwiatkowski	5	6	[10]
(Belgium) R Bemelmans (Germany) Y Maden	7	3	[8]
(Venezuela) LD Martínez (Czech Republic) L Rosol	3	6^{6}
4	(Barbados) D King (United States) H Reese	6	7^{8}
(Russia) E Donskoy (Russia) A Rublev	2	2
Alt	(Poland) K Majchrzak (Estonia) J Zopp	6	6
(Chinese Taipei) J Jung (United States) E King	1	4
2	(Australia) M Reid (Australia) J-P Smith	6	6

Quarterfinals
(Australia) A Bolt (Netherlands) S Verbeek	2	4
WC	(United States) JC Aragone (United States) M Giron	6	6
(Serbia) M Kecmanović (Germany) D Köpfer	7^{7}	6
(South Africa) L Harris (South Africa) R Roelofse	6^{4}	3
WC	(United States) C Eubanks (United States) T-S Kwiatkowski	6^{5}	6	[5]
4	(Barbados) D King (United States) H Reese	7^{7}	4	[10]
Alt	(Poland) K Majchrzak (Estonia) J Zopp	6	6^{5}	[8]
2	(Australia) M Reid (Australia) J-P Smith	4	7^{7}	[10]

Semifinals
WC	(United States) JC Aragone (United States) M Giron	3	6	[10]
(Serbia) M Kecmanović (Germany) D Köpfer	6	4	[5]
4	(Barbados) D King (United States) H Reese	6	4	[10]
2	(Australia) M Reid (Australia) J-P Smith	4	6	[6]

Final
WC	(United States) JC Aragone (United States) M Giron	6	6
4	(Barbados) D King (United States) H Reese	4	4
