= 2018 Oracle Challenger Series – Indian Wells – Men's doubles =

Indian Wells – Men's doubles
- 2018 Oracle Challenger Series – Indian Wells

Final
- Champions: (United States) Austin Krajicek (United States) Jackson Withrow
- Runners-up: (United States) Evan King (United States) Nathan Pasha
- Score: 6–7^{(3–7)}, 6–1, [11–9]

Events
Singles	men	women
Doubles	men	women
Oracle Challenger Series – Indian Wells	· 2019 →

This was the first edition of the tournament.

Austin Krajicek and Jackson Withrow won the title after defeating Evan King and Nathan Pasha 6–7^{(3–7)}, 6–1, [11–9] in the final.

== Seeds ==
1. (France) Hugo Nys / (United Kingdom) Neal Skupski (first round)
2. (Philippines) Treat Huey / (United States) Scott Lipsky (first round)
3. (France) Jérémy Chardy / (Sweden) Robert Lindstedt (quarterfinals, withdrew)
4. (India) Jeevan Nedunchezhiyan / (India) Purav Raja (quarterfinals)

== Draw ==
=== Key ===
- Q = Qualifier
- WC = Wild card
- LL = Lucky loser
- Alt = Alternate
- SE = Special exempt
- PR = Protected ranking
- ITF = ITF entry
- JE = Junior exempt
- w/o = Walkover
- r = Retired
- d = Defaulted
- SR = Special ranking

First round
1	(France) H Nys (United Kingdom) N Skupski	3	4
(Germany) P Petzschner (United States) T Smyczek	6	6
(Canada) P Polansky (Canada) A Shamasdin	6	7^{7}
(Bosnia and Herzegovina) M Bašić (Germany) Y Hanfmann	3	6^{5}
3	(France) J Chardy (Sweden) R Lindstedt	7	6
(Romania) M Copil (Slovakia) M Kližan	5	4
(United States) A Krajicek (United States) J Withrow	7^{7}	7
(Spain) A Menéndez Maceiras (Israel) D Sela	6^{4}	5
(United Kingdom) L Broady (Australia) M Reid	6^{4}	6	[10]
(United Kingdom) L Bambridge (United Kingdom) J Salisbury	7^{7}	3	[5]
WC	(United States) T Fritz (United States) R Opelka	2	6^{7}
4	(India) J Nedunchezhiyan (India) P Raja	6	7^{9}
WC	(South Africa) R Roelofse (United States) M Schnur	5	4
WC	(United States) E King (United States) N Pasha	7	6
(Ukraine) S Stakhovsky (Russia) M Youzhny	6	4	[10]
2	(Philippines) T Huey (United States) S Lipsky	3	6	[3]

Quarterfinals
(Germany) P Petzschner (United States) T Smyczek	4	6	[8]
(Canada) P Polansky (Canada) A Shamasdin	6	4	[10]
3	(France) J Chardy (Sweden) R Lindstedt
(United States) A Krajicek (United States) J Withrow	w/o
(United Kingdom) L Broady (Australia) M Reid	6	6
4	(India) J Nedunchezhiyan (India) P Raja	3	4
WC	(United States) E King (United States) N Pasha	7^{7}	6
(Ukraine) S Stakhovsky (Russia) M Youzhny	6^{4}	2

Semifinals
(Canada) P Polansky (Canada) A Shamasdin	3	4
(United States) A Krajicek (United States) J Withrow	6	6
(United Kingdom) L Broady (Australia) M Reid	3	7^{7}	[8]
WC	(United States) E King (United States) N Pasha	6	6^{5}	[10]

Final
(United States) A Krajicek (United States) J Withrow	6^{3}	6	[11]
WC	(United States) E King (United States) N Pasha	7^{7}	1	[9]
