= 2018 Oracle Challenger Series – Indian Wells – Men's singles =

Indian Wells – Men's singles
- 2018 Oracle Challenger Series – Indian Wells

Final
- Champion: (Slovakia) Martin Kližan
- Runner-up: (Barbados) Darian King
- Score: 6–3, 6–3

Events
Singles	men	women
Doubles	men	women
Oracle Challenger Series – Indian Wells	· 2019 →

This was the first edition of the tournament.

Martin Kližan won the title after defeating Darian King 6–3, 6–3 in the final.

== Seeds ==
1. (Romania) Marius Copil (quarterfinals)
2. (Bosnia and Herzegovina) Mirza Bašić (first round)
3. (Canada) Vasek Pospisil (semifinals)
4. (United States) Taylor Fritz (semifinals)
5. (United States) Frances Tiafoe (withdrew)
6. (Russia) Mikhail Youzhny (first round, retired)
7. (France) Jérémy Chardy (second round, withdrew)
8. (Israel) Dudi Sela (quarterfinals)
9. (Germany) Yannick Hanfmann (first round)

== Draw ==
=== Key ===
- Q = Qualifier
- WC = Wild card
- LL = Lucky loser
- Alt = Alternate
- SE = Special exempt
- PR = Protected ranking
- ITF = ITF entry
- JE = Junior exempt
- w/o = Walkover
- r = Retired
- d = Defaulted
- SR = Special ranking

=== Finals ===
Semifinals
(Barbados) Darian King	3	7^{7}	6
4	(United States) Taylor Fritz	6	6^{1}	2
3	(Canada) Vasek Pospisil	1	6	1
(Slovakia) Martin Kližan	6	3	6

Final
(Barbados) Darian King	3	3
(Slovakia) Martin Kližan	6	6

=== Top half ===
First round
1	(Romania) M Copil	6	6
(United Kingdom) L Broady	2	1
Q	(United States) M Krueger	6	6
WC	(United States) R Opelka	3	4
Q	(United States) A Sarkissian	5	6	3
(Barbados) D King	7	0	6
(United States) B Klahn	3	4
7	(France) J Chardy	6	6
4	(United States) T Fritz	6	6
WC	(United States) N Rubin	3	3
WC	(United States) S Korda	0	4
(Slovakia) N Gombos	6	6
Alt	(Spain) R Ojeda Lara	6	6
(Canada) F Auger-Aliassime	0	4
(United States) T Smyczek	1	6^{10}
8	(Israel) D Sela	6	7^{12}

Second round
1	(Romania) M Copil	6	1	6
Q	(United States) M Krueger	1	6	4
(Barbados) D King	w/o
7	(France) J Chardy
4	(United States) T Fritz	6	6
(Slovakia) N Gombos	3	4
Alt	(Spain) R Ojeda Lara	1	6	4
8	(Israel) D Sela	6	1	6

Quarterfinals
1	(Romania) M Copil	2	5
(Barbados) D King	6	7
4	(United States) T Fritz	6	6
8	(Israel) D Sela	3	2

Semifinals
(Barbados) D King	3	7^{7}	6
4	(United States) T Fritz	6	6^{1}	2

=== Bottom half ===
First round
9	(Germany) Y Hanfmann	6	3	3
Q	(United States) C Harrison	3	6	6
LL	(South Africa) N Scholtz	7^{8}	4	4
SE	(United States) D Novikov	6^{6}	6	6
(Spain) A Menéndez Maceiras	3	6^{3}
Q	(United States) M Giron	6	7^{7}
(France) C Hemery	3	7^{7}	3
3	(Canada) V Pospisil	6	6^{4}	6
6	(Russia) M Youzhny	6^{3}	0^{r}
(Switzerland) H Laaksonen	7^{7}	2
(Ukraine) S Stakhovsky	3	6	3
(Slovakia) M Kližan	6	2	6
(Canada) P Polansky	6	6
WC	(United States) E King	4	2
(United States) S Kozlov	7	6
2	(Bosnia and Herzegovina) M Bašić	5	4

Second round
Q	(United States) C Harrison	6	7^{7}
SE	(United States) D Novikov	3	6^{5}
Q	(United States) M Giron	6	6^{6}	1
3	(Canada) V Pospisil	4	7^{8}	6
(Switzerland) H Laaksonen	3	5
(Slovakia) M Kližan	6	7
(Canada) P Polansky	6	6
(United States) S Kozlov	2	4

Quarterfinals
Q	(United States) C Harrison	6^{7}	1
3	(Canada) V Pospisil	7^{9}	6
(Slovakia) M Kližan	6	6
(Canada) P Polansky	2	2

Semifinals
3	(Canada) V Pospisil	1	6	1
(Slovakia) M Kližan	6	3	6
