= 2020 Oracle Challenger Series – Indian Wells – Men's singles =

Tennis event

Indian Wells – Men's singles
- 2020 Oracle Challenger Series – Indian Wells

Final
- Champion: (United States) Steve Johnson
- Runner-up: (United States) Jack Sock
- Score: 6–4, 6–4

Events
Singles	men	women
Doubles	men	women
← 2019 ·	Oracle Challenger Series – Indian Wells	· 2021 →

Kyle Edmund was the defending champion but chose not to defend his title.

Steve Johnson won the title after defeating Jack Sock 6–4, 6–4 in the final.

== Seeds ==
All seeds receive a bye into the second round.

1. (France) Ugo Humbert (second round)
2. (France) Lucas Pouille (second round)
3. (United Kingdom) Cameron Norrie (withdrew)
4. (Moldova) Radu Albot (second round)
5. (United States) Steve Johnson (champion)
6. (Italy) Jannik Sinner (third round)
7. (Japan) Yūichi Sugita (second round)
8. (United States) Frances Tiafoe (third round)
9. (France) Grégoire Barrère (quarterfinals)
10. (Italy) Salvatore Caruso (third round)
11. (United States) Denis Kudla (quarterfinals)
12. (Japan) Taro Daniel (third round)
13. (Russia) Evgeny Donskoy (third round)
14. (United States) Marcos Giron (quarterfinals)
15. (Australia) Christopher O'Connell (second round)
16. (Germany) Peter Gojowczyk (second round)

== Draw ==
=== Key ===
- Q = Qualifier
- WC = Wild card
- LL = Lucky loser
- Alt = Alternate
- SE = Special exempt
- PR = Protected ranking
- ITF = ITF entry
- JE = Junior exempt
- w/o = Walkover
- r = Retired
- d = Defaulted
- SR = Special ranking

=== Finals ===
Quarterfinals
PR	(United States) Jack Sock	7^{7}	5	6
11	(United States) Denis Kudla	6^{5}	7	4
14	(United States) Marcos Giron	6^{2}	6	2
(United States) Brandon Nakashima	7^{7}	3	6
9	(France) Grégoire Barrère	4	6^{5}
(United States) Mitchell Krueger	6	7^{7}
5	(United States) Steve Johnson	6	6
(United States) Noah Rubin	3	3

Semifinals
PR	(United States) Jack Sock	6^{5}	6	6
(United States) Brandon Nakashima	7^{7}	3	4
(United States) Mitchell Krueger	4	4
5	(United States) Steve Johnson	6	6

Final
PR	(United States) Jack Sock	4	4
5	(United States) Steve Johnson	6	6

=== Top half ===
==== Section 1 ====
First round
(Japan) K Uchida	1	7	2
PR	(United States) J Sock	6	5	6
(United States) Mi Redlicki	6	6
(China) Z Li	2	2
(France) M Janvier	6	6
(United States) B Klahn	4	4
Q	(Netherlands) S Verbeek	7^{7}	6
(United States) M Cressy	6^{4}	3

Second round
1/WC	(France) U Humbert	6^{5}	4
PR	(United States) J Sock	7^{7}	6
(United States) Mi Redlicki	6^{4}	0
13	(Russia) E Donskoy	7^{7}	6
11	(United States) D Kudla	6	6
(France) M Janvier	2	1
Q	(Netherlands) S Verbeek	0	1
6	(Italy) J Sinner	6	6

Third round
PR	(United States) J Sock	6	4	7^{7}
13	(Russia) E Donskoy	4	6	6^{3}
11	(United States) D Kudla	6	6^{4}	6
6	(Italy) J Sinner	3	7^{7}	2

Quarterfinals
PR	(United States) J Sock	7^{7}	5	6
11	(United States) D Kudla	6^{5}	7	4

==== Section 2 ====
First round
(Italy) R Marcora	6	6
Q	(United States) Gage Brymer	4	3
WC	(United States) K Smith	6^{5}	4
(United Kingdom) R Peniston	7^{7}	6
(United States) T-S Kwiatkowski	7^{7}	6
(South Korea) Hy Chung	6^{2}	2
(United Kingdom) L Broady	2	3
(United States) B Nakashima	6	6

Second round
Alt	(Monaco) R Arneodo	6	1	6^{8}
(Italy) R Marcora	4	6	7^{10}
(United Kingdom) R Peniston	2	6^{4}
14	(United States) M Giron	6	7^{7}
10	(Italy) S Caruso	6	6
(United States) T-S Kwiatkowski	4	2
(United States) B Nakashima	6	6
7	(Japan) Y Sugita	3	2

Third round
(Italy) R Marcora	6^{4}	1
14	(United States) M Giron	7^{7}	6
10	(Italy) S Caruso	4	3
(United States) B Nakashima	6	6

Quarterfinals
14	(United States) M Giron	6^{2}	6	2
(United States) B Nakashima	7^{7}	3	6

=== Bottom half ===
==== Section 3 ====
First round
(Australia) A Santillan	0	3
(United States) M Mmoh	6	6
(Germany) M Zverev	5	6	7^{8}
(United States) JC Aragone	7	0	6^{6}
WC	(United States) B Holt	3	1
(United States) S Korda	6	6
(United States) M Krueger	0	7^{7}	7
(Israel) D Sela	6	6^{4}	5

Second round
8	(United States) F Tiafoe	6	6
(United States) M Mmoh	4	3
(Germany) M Zverev	3	6	5
9	(France) G Barrère	6	3	7
15	(Australia) C O'Connell	1	1
(United States) S Korda	6	6
(United States) M Krueger	0	6	6
4/WC	(Moldova) R Albot	6	4	4

Third round
8	(United States) F Tiafoe	6	2	6^{4}
9	(France) G Barrère	4	6	7^{7}
(United States) S Korda	2	1
(United States) M Krueger	6	6

Quarterfinals
9	(France) G Barrère	4	6^{5}
(United States) M Krueger	6	7^{7}

==== Section 4 ====
First round
WC	(United States) G Nanda	2	3
(Australia) M Polmans	6	6
PR	(Australia) B Mott	0	4
(United States) M McDonald	6	6
(Romania) M Copil	3	3
PR	(United States) R Sarmiento	6	6
(United States) N Rubin	3	7^{7}	6
(Serbia) D Petrović	6	6^{4}	1

Second round
5	(United States) S Johnson	6	3	6
(Australia) M Polmans	1	6	2
(United States) M McDonald	5	6^{6}
12	(Japan) T Daniel	7	7^{8}
16	(Germany) P Gojowczyk	6	3	2
PR	(United States) R Sarmiento	4	6	6
(United States) N Rubin	6	7^{7}
2	(France) L Pouille	4	6^{5}

Third round
5	(United States) S Johnson	7^{7}	6
12	(Japan) T Daniel	6^{3}	2
PR	(United States) R Sarmiento	3	1
(United States) N Rubin	6	6

Quarterfinals
5	(United States) S Johnson	6	6
(United States) N Rubin	3	3
