= 2020 Oracle Challenger Series – Indian Wells – Women's singles =

Tennis event

Indian Wells – Women's singles
- 2020 Oracle Challenger Series – Indian Wells

Final
- Champion: (Romania) Irina-Camelia Begu
- Runner-up: (Japan) Misaki Doi
- Score: 6–3, 6–3

Events
Singles	men	women
Doubles	men	women
← 2019 ·	Oracle Challenger Series – Indian Wells	· 2021 →

Viktorija Golubic was the defending champion but chose not to participate.

Irina-Camelia Begu won the title, without losing a set throughout the tournament, defeating Misaki Doi in the final, 6–3, 6–3.

== Seeds ==
All seeds received a bye into the second round.

1. (Czech Republic) Kateřina Siniaková (third round)
2. (Russia) Anna Blinkova (second round)
3. (United States) Bernarda Pera (third round)
4. (United States) Taylor Townsend (second round)
5. (Germany) Laura Siegemund (quarterfinals)
6. (Japan) Nao Hibino (second round)
7. (United States) Madison Brengle (second round)
8. (China) Zhu Lin (third round)
9. (United States) Jessica Pegula (quarterfinals)
10. (Romania) Patricia Maria Țig (withdrew)
11. (Puerto Rico) Monica Puig (withdrew)
12. (United States) Christina McHale (second round)
13. (Japan) Misaki Doi (final)
14. (United States) Kristie Ahn (third round)
15. (Australia) Samantha Stosur (second round)
16. (Russia) Varvara Gracheva (second round)

== Draw ==
=== Key ===
- Q = Qualifier
- WC = Wild card
- LL = Lucky loser
- Alt = Alternate
- SE = Special exempt
- PR = Protected ranking
- ITF = ITF entry
- JE = Junior exempt
- w/o = Walkover
- r = Retired
- d = Defaulted
- SR = Special ranking

=== Finals ===
Quarterfinals
PR	(Russia) Vera Zvonareva	6	4	6
5	(Germany) Laura Siegemund	1	6	2
13	(Japan) Misaki Doi	4	7	7^{7}
(Belgium) Yanina Wickmayer	6	5	6^{3}
9	(United States) Jessica Pegula	5	1
(Romania) Irina-Camelia Begu	7	6
(Serbia) Olga Danilović	6	5	5
(Ukraine) Lesia Tsurenko	2	7	7

Semifinals
PR	(Russia) Vera Zvonareva
13	(Japan) Misaki Doi	w/o
(Romania) Irina-Camelia Begu	6	6
(Ukraine) Lesia Tsurenko	4	4

Final
13	(Japan) Misaki Doi	3	3
(Romania) Irina-Camelia Begu	6	6

=== Top half ===
==== Section 1 ====
First round
(United States) S Vickery	6	6
(United States) C McNally	2	3
PR	(Russia) V Zvonareva	6	6
(China) Xiy Wang	4	1
(Japan) K Nara	7^{7}	6
WC	(United States) J Loeb	6^{2}	4
(United States) A Li	1	7^{7}	1
(United Kingdom) H Dart	6	6^{4}	6

Second round
1	(Czech Republic) K Siniaková	7	2	6
(United States) S Vickery	5	6	0
PR	(Russia) V Zvonareva	4	6	6
15	(Australia) S Stosur	6	2	2
LL	(United States) H Chang	1	3
(Japan) K Nara	6	6
(United Kingdom) H Dart	2	5
5	(Germany) L Siegemund	6	7

Third round
1	(Czech Republic) K Siniaková	6	3	4
PR	(Russia) V Zvonareva	3	6	6
(Japan) K Nara	2	2
5	(Germany) L Siegemund	6	6

Quarterfinals
PR	(Russia) V Zvonareva	6	4	6
5	(Germany) L Siegemund	1	6	2

==== Section 2 ====
First round
WC	(United States) C Vandeweghe	6^{7}	2
(China) Xin Wang	7^{9}	6
(United States) V Lepchenko	4	3
Q	(United States) A Muhammad	6	6
(Austria) B Haas	6	1	6
PR	(United States) I Falconi	4	6	3
(Belgium) Y Wickmayer	6	6
WC	(United States) C Liu	1	4

Second round
3	(United States) B Pera	6	4	6
(China) Xin Wang	4	6	4
Q	(United States) A Muhammad	2	3
13	(Japan) M Doi	6	6
12	(United States) C McHale	6	4	3
(Austria) B Haas	4	6	6
(Belgium) Y Wickmayer	6^{4}	7^{7}	6
7	(United States) M Brengle	7^{7}	6^{2}	2

Third round
3	(United States) B Pera	6	4	4
13	(Japan) M Doi	3	6	6
(Austria) B Haas	1	6^{6}
(Belgium) Y Wickmayer	6	7^{7}

Quarterfinals
13	(Japan) M Doi	4	7	7^{7}
(Belgium) Y Wickmayer	6	5	6^{3}

=== Bottom half ===
==== Section 3 ====
First round
(United States) S Rogers	6	6
(United States) N Gibbs	3	4
(Russia) N Vikhlyantseva	2	7^{7}	6
(Ukraine) A Kalinina	6	6^{5}	4
(Russia) A Kalinskaya	0	4
(United States) UM Arconada	6	6
PR	(Germany) M Barthel	4	1
(Romania) I-C Begu	6	6

Second round
6	(Japan) N Hibino	3	0
(United States) S Rogers	6	6
(Russia) N Vikhlyantseva	4	6^{5}
9	(United States) J Pegula	6	7^{7}
14	(United States) K Ahn	6	4	6
(United States) UM Arconada	1	6	1
(Romania) I-C Begu	6	6
4	(United States) T Townsend	0	2

Third round
(United States) S Rogers	6^{4}	2
9	(United States) J Pegula	7^{7}	6
14	(United States) K Ahn	3	3
(Romania) I-C Begu	6	6

Quarterfinals
9	(United States) J Pegula	5	1
(Romania) I-C Begu	7	6

==== Section 4 ====
First round
(Ukraine) K Zavatska	1	6	6
(United States) F Di Lorenzo	6	1	3
(Serbia) O Danilović	1	6	6
(Paraguay) V Cepede Royg	6	4	4
(Ukraine) L Tsurenko	6	3	6
Q	(United States) D Lao	3	6	1
WC	(United States) H Baptiste	5	3
PR	(United Kingdom) K Boulter	7	6

Second round
8	(China) L Zhu	6	7^{7}
(Ukraine) K Zavatska	3	6^{3}
(Serbia) O Danilović	6	6
LL	(United States) M Mateas	3	0
16	(Russia) V Gracheva	6	4	2
(Ukraine) L Tsurenko	0	6	6
PR	(United Kingdom) K Boulter	6	3	6
2	(Russia) A Blinkova	4	6	3

Third round
8	(China) L Zhu	4	5
(Serbia) O Danilović	6	7
(Ukraine) L Tsurenko	6	6
PR	(United Kingdom) K Boulter	3	3

Quarterfinals
(Serbia) O Danilović	6	5	5
(Ukraine) L Tsurenko	2	7	7

== Qualifying ==
=== Seeds ===
1. (United States) Asia Muhammad (qualified)
2. (United States) Danielle Lao (qualified)

=== Qualifiers ===
1. (United States) Asia Muhammad
2. (United States) Danielle Lao

=== Lucky losers ===
1. (United States) Hanna Chang
2. (United States) Maria Mateas

=== Draw ===
==== First qualifier ====
Qualifying competition
1	(United States) Asia Muhammad	7	2	6
WC	(United States) Maria Mateas	5	6	3

==== Second qualifier ====
Qualifying competition
2	(United States) Danielle Lao	6	5	6
WC	(United States) Hanna Chang	1	7	2
