= 2020 Oracle Challenger Series – Indian Wells – Women's doubles =

Indian Wells – Women's doubles
- 2020 Oracle Challenger Series – Indian Wells

Final
- Champions: (United States) Asia Muhammad (United States) Taylor Townsend
- Runners-up: (United States) Caty McNally (United States) Jessica Pegula
- Score: 6–4, 6–4

Events
Singles	men	women
Doubles	men	women
← 2019 ·	Oracle Challenger Series – Indian Wells	· 2021 →

Kristýna Plíšková and Evgeniya Rodina were the defending champions, but chose not to defend their title.

Asia Muhammad and Taylor Townsend won the title, defeating Caty McNally and Jessica Pegula in the final, 6–4, 6–4.

== Seeds ==
1. (China) Duan Yingying / (Japan) Nao Hibino (first round)
2. (Japan) Makoto Ninomiya / (China) Yang Zhaoxuan (quarterfinals)
3. (Australia) Samantha Stosur / (Belgium) Yanina Wickmayer (semifinals)
4. (United States) Asia Muhammad / (United States) Taylor Townsend (champions)

== Draw ==
=== Key ===
- Q = Qualifier
- WC = Wild card
- LL = Lucky loser
- Alt = Alternate
- SE = Special exempt
- PR = Protected ranking
- ITF = ITF entry
- JE = Junior exempt
- w/o = Walkover
- r = Retired
- d = Defaulted
- SR = Special ranking

=== Draw ===
First round
1	(China) Y Duan (Japan) N Hibino	5	0
(Japan) M Doi (Germany) L Siegemund	7	6
(Chinese Taipei) C-y Hsu (United States) C Whoriskey	6	6^{6}	[5]
(United States) C McNally (United States) J Pegula	3	7^{8}	[10]
3	(Australia) S Stosur (Belgium) Y Wickmayer	6	6
(Russia) A Kalinskaya (United States) C Vandeweghe	2	4
WC	(United States) H Baptiste (United States) C Liu	4	3
(United States) Q Gleason (United States) J Loeb	6	6
(United States) V King (Russia) V Zvonareva	6	6
(Indonesia) B Gumulya (Indonesia) J Rompies	3	4
(China) Xin Wang (China) L Zhu	3	2
4	(United States) A Muhammad (United States) T Townsend	6	6
(Russia) A Blinkova (United States) C McHale	6	6
(Germany) M Barthel (United Kingdom) E Webley-Smith	1	3
(United States) UM Arconada (United Kingdom) H Dart	3	6^{4}
2	(Japan) M Ninomiya (China) Z Yang	6	7^{7}

Quarterfinals
(Japan) M Doi (Germany) L Siegemund	1	6	[5]
(United States) C McNally (United States) J Pegula	6	3	[10]
3	(Australia) S Stosur (Belgium) Y Wickmayer	7	1	[11]
(United States) Q Gleason (United States) J Loeb	5	6	[9]
(United States) V King (Russia) V Zvonareva	3	2
4	(United States) A Muhammad (United States) T Townsend	6	6
(Russia) A Blinkova (United States) C McHale	7	6
2	(Japan) M Ninomiya (China) Z Yang	5	4

Semifinals
(United States) C McNally (United States) J Pegula	6	6
3	(Australia) S Stosur (Belgium) Y Wickmayer	1	2
4	(United States) A Muhammad (United States) T Townsend	6	6^{5}	[10]
(Russia) A Blinkova (United States) C McHale	1	7^{7}	[8]

Final
(United States) C McNally (United States) J Pegula	4	4
4	(United States) A Muhammad (United States) T Townsend	6	6
