= 2019 Oracle Challenger Series – Indian Wells – Women's singles =

Indian Wells – Women's singles
- 2019 Oracle Challenger Series – Indian Wells

Final
- Champion: (Switzerland) Viktorija Golubic
- Runner-up: (United States) Jennifer Brady
- Score: 3–6, 7–5, 6–3

Events
Singles	men	women
Doubles	men	women
- Oracle Challenger Series – Indian Wells

Sara Errani was the defending champion, but lost in the first round to Allie Kiick.

Viktorija Golubic won the title, defeating Jennifer Brady in the final, 3–6, 7–5, 6–3.

== Seeds ==
All seeds received a bye into the second round.

1. (China) Wang Qiang (semifinals)
2. (United States) Alison Riske (third round)
3. (Belarus) Vera Lapko (second round)
4. (France) Kristina Mladenovic (second round)
5. (Russia) Evgeniya Rodina (second round)
6. (Spain) Sara Sorribes Tormo (quarterfinals)
7. (Estonia) Kaia Kanepi (third round)
8. (Czech Republic) Kristýna Plíšková (quarterfinals)
9. (United States) Taylor Townsend (third round)
10. (United States) Jessica Pegula (third round)
11. (Kazakhstan) Zarina Diyas (semifinals)
12. (United States) Madison Brengle (second round)
13. (Luxembourg) Mandy Minella (second round)
14. (Switzerland) Viktorija Golubic (champion)
15. (China) Zhu Lin (second round)
16. (Romania) Sorana Cîrstea (second round)

== Draw ==
Key

- Q = Qualifier
- WC = Wild card
- LL = Lucky loser
- Alt = Alternate
- ITF = ITF entry
- PR = Protected ranking
- SR = Special ranking
- SE = Special exempt
- JE = Junior exempt
- JR = Junior Accelerator Programme entrant
- CO = College Accelerator Programme entrant
- NG = Next Gen Accelerator Program entrant
- w/o = Walkover
- r = Retired
- d = Defaulted

=== Finals ===
Quarterfinals
1/WC	(China) Wang Qiang	6	6
8	(Czech Republic) Kristýna Plíšková	4	4
14	(Switzerland) Viktorija Golubic	6	7
6	(Spain) Sara Sorribes Tormo	0	5
11	(Kazakhstan) Zarina Diyas	6	6
(United States) Francesca Di Lorenzo	4	3
(United States) Nicole Gibbs	5	0
(United States) Jennifer Brady	7	6

Semifinals
1/WC	(China) Wang Qiang	5	1
14	(Switzerland) Viktorija Golubic	7	6
11	(Kazakhstan) Zarina Diyas	3	3
(United States) Jennifer Brady	6	6

Final
14	(Switzerland) Viktorija Golubic	3	7	6
(United States) Jennifer Brady	6	5	3

=== Top half ===
==== Section 1 ====
First round
(United States) L Davis	7	4	4
(Russia) N Vikhlyantseva	5	6	6
Q	(United States) E Shibahara	2	1
(United States) C Liu	6	6
(Serbia) O Danilović	4	6	6
(United States) C Dolehide	6	3	1
(United States) W Osuigwe	6	6^{5}	5
(United States) K Ahn	3	7^{7}	7

Second round
1/WC	(China) Q Wang	2	6	6
(Russia) N Vikhlyantseva	6	0	3
(United States) C Liu	6	3	6
13	(Luxembourg) M Minella	2	6	1
8	(Czech Republic) Kr Plíšková	2	7	7
(Serbia) O Danilović	6	5	5
(United States) K Ahn	7^{7}	3	6
16	(Romania) S Cîrstea	6^{4}	6	3

Third round
1/WC	(China) Q Wang	6	6
(United States) C Liu	1	4
8	(Czech Republic) Kr Plíšková	6	7^{7}
(United States) K Ahn	1	6^{2}

Quarterfinals
1/WC	(China) Q Wang	6	6
8	(Czech Republic) Kr Plíšková	4	4

==== Section 2 ====
First round
WC	(United States) C McNally	5	6	6
(Bulgaria) S Karatantcheva	7	4	4
(Hungary) F Stollár	3	4
WC	(United States) J Loeb	6	6
Q	(United States) K Day	4	5
(United States) A Muhammad	6	7
(Ukraine) K Kozlova	0	3
(United States) V Lepchenko	6	6

Second round
3	(Belarus) V Lapko	2	4
WC	(United States) C McNally	6	6
WC	(United States) J Loeb	3	2
14	(Switzerland) V Golubic	6	6
10	(United States) J Pegula	6	6
(United States) A Muhammad	3	0
(United States) V Lepchenko	6^{4}	2
6	(Spain) S Sorribes Tormo	7^{7}	6

Third round
WC	(United States) C McNally	6^{4}	1
14	(Switzerland) V Golubic	7^{7}	6
10	(United States) J Pegula	2	2
6	(Spain) S Sorribes Tormo	6	6

Quarterfinals
14	(Switzerland) V Golubic	6	7
6	(Spain) S Sorribes Tormo	0	5

=== Bottom half ===
==== Section 3 ====
First round
(United States) A Kiick	6	5	6
(Italy) S Errani	3	7	2
(United Kingdom) H Watson	4	6^{4}
(China) X Han	6	7^{7}
(United States) F Di Lorenzo	4	7	6
(Japan) N Hibino	6	5	3
(Switzerland) T Bacsinszky	6	1	6
WC	(United States) C Gauff	3	6	4

Second round
7	(Estonia) K Kanepi	6	6
(United States) A Kiick	0	2
(China) X Han	1	1
11	(Kazakhstan) Z Diyas	6	6
15	(China) L Zhu	6	3	4
(United States) F Di Lorenzo	1	6	6
(Switzerland) T Bacsinszky	3	6	6
4	(France) K Mladenovic	6	4	3

Third round
7	(Estonia) K Kanepi	3	6^{6}
11	(Kazakhstan) Z Diyas	6	7^{8}
(United States) F Di Lorenzo	1	6	7^{7}
(Switzerland) T Bacsinszky	6	2	6^{4}

Quarterfinals
11	(Kazakhstan) Z Diyas	6	6
(United States) F Di Lorenzo	4	3

==== Section 4 ====
First round
(United States) N Gibbs	6	6
(Australia) P Hon	0	4
(United States) S Vickery	6	6
(Israel) J Glushko	3	2
WC	(United States) K Volynets	3	3
(United States) J Brady	6	6
(France) F Ferro	6	3	3
(Belgium) Y Wickmayer	1	6	6

Second round
5	(Russia) E Rodina	5	3
(United States) N Gibbs	7	6
(United States) S Vickery	5	2
9	(United States) T Townsend	7	6
12	(United States) M Brengle	3	1
(United States) J Brady	6	6
(Belgium) Y Wickmayer	6	3	3
2	(United States) A Riske	3	6	6

Third round
(United States) N Gibbs	6	6
9	(United States) T Townsend	1	1
(United States) J Brady	6	7^{7}
2	(United States) A Riske	3	6^{4}

Quarterfinals
(United States) N Gibbs	5	0
(United States) J Brady	7	6

== Qualifying ==
=== Seeds ===
1. (Japan) Mayo Hibi (qualifying competition)
2. (Serbia) Jovana Jakšić (qualifying competition)

=== Qualifiers ===
1. (United States) Ena Shibahara
2. (United States) Kayla Day

=== Qualifying draw ===
==== First qualifier ====
Qualifying competition
1	(Japan) Mayo Hibi	6	3	4
WC	(United States) Ena Shibahara	2	6	6

==== Second qualifier ====
Qualifying competition
2	(Serbia) Jovana Jakšić	7^{7}	4	1
WC	(United States) Kayla Day	6^{2}	6	6
