= 2018 Oracle Challenger Series – Indian Wells – Women's doubles =

Indian Wells – Women's doubles
- 2018 Oracle Challenger Series – Indian Wells

Final
- Champions: (United States) Taylor Townsend (Belgium) Yanina Wickmayer
- Runners-up: (United States) Jennifer Brady (United States) Vania King
- Score: 6–4, 6–4

Events
Singles	men	women
Doubles	men	women
Oracle Challenger Series – Indian Wells	· 2019 →

This was the first edition of the tournament.

Taylor Townsend and Yanina Wickmayer won the title after defeating Jennifer Brady and Vania King 6–4, 6–4 in the final.

== Seeds ==
1. (Romania) Raluca Olaru / (Ukraine) Olga Savchuk (first round)
2. (Czech Republic) Barbora Krejčíková / (Belarus) Vera Lapko (semifinals)
3. (United States) Jennifer Brady / (United States) Vania King (final)
4. (China) Duan Yingying / (China) Wang Yafan (quarterfinals)

== Draw ==
=== Key ===
- Q = Qualifier
- WC = Wild card
- LL = Lucky loser
- Alt = Alternate
- SE = Special exempt
- PR = Protected ranking
- ITF = ITF entry
- JE = Junior exempt
- w/o = Walkover
- r = Retired
- d = Defaulted
- SR = Special ranking

=== Draw ===
First round
1	(Romania) R Olaru (Ukraine) O Savchuk	3	5
(United States) S Chang (United States) A Mueller	6	7
(United States) C Dolehide (United States) A Riske	6	6
(United Kingdom) N Broady (Czech Republic) E Hrdinová	3	3
3	(United States) J Brady (United States) V King	6	6
(Japan) M Doi (Russia) E Rodina	4	3
(Brazil) PC Gonçalves (United States) S Marand	6	6^{8}	[1]
WC	(United States) J Elbaba (United States) I Neel	3	7^{10}	[10]
(Switzerland) V Golubic (Poland) M Linette	1	3
(United States) T Townsend (Belgium) Y Wickmayer	6	6
Alt	(United States) S Kenin (United States) A Weinhold	1	6^{3}
4	(China) Y Duan (China) Y Wang	6	7^{7}
(Australia) A Tomljanović (Russia) V Zvonareva	4	6	[5]
(Germany) A Petkovic (Italy) F Schiavone	6	3	[10]
(Ukraine) K Bondarenko (United States) V Lepchenko	0	0
2	(Czech Republic) B Krejčíková (Belarus) V Lapko	6	6

Quarterfinals
(United States) S Chang (United States) A Mueller	1	1
(United States) C Dolehide (United States) A Riske	6	6
3	(United States) J Brady (United States) V King	6	6
WC	(United States) J Elbaba (United States) I Neel	1	3
(United States) T Townsend (Belgium) Y Wickmayer	6	6^{5}	[10]
4	(China) Y Duan (China) Y Wang	4	7^{7}	[6]
(Germany) A Petkovic (Italy) F Schiavone	3	4
2	(Czech Republic) B Krejčíková (Belarus) V Lapko	6	6

Semifinals
(United States) C Dolehide (United States) A Riske	2	3
3	(United States) J Brady (United States) V King	6	6
(United States) T Townsend (Belgium) Y Wickmayer	6	6^{3}	[10]
2	(Czech Republic) B Krejčíková (Belarus) V Lapko	2	7^{7}	[6]

Final
3	(United States) J Brady (United States) V King	4	4
(United States) T Townsend (Belgium) Y Wickmayer	6	6
