= 2018 Oracle Challenger Series – Indian Wells =

- Date: February 26 – March 4
- Edition: 1st
- Category: ATP Challenger Tour; WTA 125K series
- Draw: 32S / 16D
- Prize money: $150,000+H (ATP) $150,000 (WTA)
- Surface: Hard, outdoor
- Location: Indian Wells, United States
- Venue: Indian Wells Tennis Garden

Champions

Men's singles
- (Slovakia) Martin Kližan

Women's singles
- (Italy) Sara Errani

Men's doubles
- (United States) Austin Krajicek / (United States) Jackson Withrow

Women's doubles
- (United States) Taylor Townsend / (Belgium) Yanina Wickmayer
Oracle Challenger Series – Indian Wells	· 2019 →

The 2018 Oracle Challenger Series – Indian Wells is a professional tennis tournament played on outdoor hard courts. This tournament is part of the 2018 ATP Challenger Tour and the 2018 WTA 125K series. The first edition took place on February 26 through March 4, 2018, in Indian Wells, United States.

== Men's singles main-draw entrants ==
=== Seeds ===
Country	Player	Rank^{1}	Seed
ROU	Marius Copil	73	1
BIH	Mirza Bašić	74	2
CAN	Vasek Pospisil	83	3
USA	Taylor Fritz	85	4
~~USA~~	~~Frances Tiafoe~~	~~91~~	~~5~~
RUS	Mikhail Youzhny	93	6
FRA	Jérémy Chardy	96	7
ISR	Dudi Sela	97	8
GER	Yannick Hanfmann	117	9

- ^{1} Rankings are as of 19 February 2018.

=== Other entrants ===
The following players received wildcards into the singles main draw:

- (United States) Evan King
- (United States) Sebastian Korda
- (United States) Reilly Opelka
- (United States) Noah Rubin

The following player received entry into the singles main draw as a special exempt:

- (United States) Dennis Novikov

The following player received entry into the singles main draw as an alternate:

- (Spain) Ricardo Ojeda Lara

The following players received entry from the qualifying draw:

- (United States) Marcos Giron
- (United States) Christian Harrison
- (United States) Mitchell Krueger
- (United States) Alexander Sarkissian

The following player received entry as a lucky loser:

- (South Africa) Nicolaas Scholtz

== Women's singles main-draw entrants ==
=== Seeds ===
Country	Player	Rank^{1}	Seed
POL	Magda Linette	55	1
USA	Varvara Lepchenko	66	2
TPE	Hsieh Su-wei	69	3
UKR	Kateryna Bondarenko	78	4
USA	Jennifer Brady	88	5
ITA	Francesca Schiavone	93	6
RUS	Natalia Vikhlyantseva	94	7
CHN	Duan Yingying	96	8

- ^{1} Rankings are as of 19 February 2018.

=== Other entrants ===
The following players received wildcards into the singles main draw:

- (United States) Danielle Collins
- (United States) Caroline Dolehide
- (United States) Ashley Kratzer
- (Russia) Vera Zvonareva

The following players received entry from the qualifying draw:

- (United States) Amanda Anisimova
- (United Kingdom) Naomi Broady
- (Japan) Misaki Doi
- (United States) Victoria Duval
- (Italy) Sara Errani
- (China) Wang Yafan

=== Withdrawals ===
Before the tournament

- (Russia) Ekaterina Alexandrova → replaced by (United States) Kristie Ahn
- (Romania) Monica Niculescu → replaced by (Russia) Evgeniya Rodina
- (Japan) Naomi Osaka → replaced by (Netherlands) Richèl Hogenkamp

== WTA doubles main-draw entrants ==
=== Seeds ===
Country	Player	Country	Player	Rank^{1}	Seed
ROU	Raluca Olaru	UKR	Olga Savchuk	97	1
CZE	Barbora Krejčíková	BLR	Vera Lapko	135	2
USA	Jennifer Brady	USA	Vania King	178	3
CHN	Duan Yingying	CHN	Wang Yafan	218	4

- ^{1} Rankings as of 19 February 2018.

=== Other entrants ===
The following team received wildcard into the doubles main draw:

- (United States) Julia Elbaba / (United States) Ingrid Neel

== Champions ==
=== Men's singles ===
- (Slovakia) Martin Kližan def. (Barbados) Darian King 6–3, 6–3.

=== Women's singles ===
- (Italy) Sara Errani def. (Ukraine) Kateryna Bondarenko 6–4, 6–2

=== Men's doubles ===
- (United States) Austin Krajicek / (United States) Jackson Withrow def. (United States) Evan King / (United States) Nathan Pasha 6–7^{(3–7)}, 6–1, [11–9].

=== Women's doubles ===
- (United States) Taylor Townsend / (Belgium) Yanina Wickmayer def. (United States) Jennifer Brady / (United States) Vania King 6–4, 6–4
