= 2019 Oracle Challenger Series – Indian Wells – Women's doubles =

Indian Wells – Women's doubles
- 2019 Oracle Challenger Series – Indian Wells

Final
- Champions: (Czech Republic) Kristýna Plíšková (Russia) Evgeniya Rodina
- Runners-up: (United States) Taylor Townsend (Belgium) Yanina Wickmayer
- Score: 7–6^{(9–7)}, 6–4

Events
Singles	men	women
Doubles	men	women
← 2018 ·	Oracle Challenger Series – Indian Wells	· 2020 →

Kristýna Plíšková and Evgeniya Rodina won the title, defeating defending champions Taylor Townsend and Yanina Wickmayer, in the final, 7–6^{(9–7)}, 6–4.

== Seeds ==
1. (Hungary) Fanny Stollár / (United Kingdom) Heather Watson (first round)
2. (Japan) Nao Hibino / (Georgia (country)) Oksana Kalashnikova (quarterfinals)
3. (Serbia) Olga Danilović / (Ukraine) Nadiia Kichenok (first round)
4. (Romania) Sorana Cîrstea / (Spain) Sara Sorribes Tormo (first round)

== Draw ==
=== Key ===
- Q = Qualifier
- WC = Wild card
- LL = Lucky loser
- Alt = Alternate
- SE = Special exempt
- PR = Protected ranking
- ITF = ITF entry
- JE = Junior exempt
- w/o = Walkover
- r = Retired
- d = Defaulted
- SR = Special ranking

=== Draw ===
First round
1	(Hungary) F Stollár (United Kingdom) H Watson	6	3	[5]
(Kazakhstan) A Danilina (United States) I Neel	3	6	[10]
(Italy) S Errani (Croatia) D Jurak	1	4
(United States) N Gibbs (United States) A Muhammad	6	6
4	(Romania) S Cîrstea (Spain) S Sorribes Tormo	5	6	[5]
(China) X Han (Australia) P Hon	7	3	[10]
(Czech Republic) Kr Plíšková (Russia) E Rodina	6	7
(United States) S Chang (United States) A Mueller	2	5
WC	(United States) S Marand (United States) W Osuigwe	6^{4}	6	[3]
(Belarus) V Lapko (Luxembourg) M Minella	7^{7}	4	[10]
(United States) H Carter (United States) E Shibahara	4	6	[10]
3	(Serbia) O Danilović (Ukraine) N Kichenok	6	3	[6]
(United States) T Townsend (Belgium) Y Wickmayer	6	6
(Switzerland) T Bacsinszky (United States) Q Gleason	4	0
(Switzerland) V Golubic (United States) J Loeb	2	0
2	(Japan) N Hibino (Georgia (country)) O Kalashnikova	6	6

Quarterfinals
(Kazakhstan) A Danilina (United States) I Neel	6	3	[11]
(United States) N Gibbs (United States) A Muhammad	3	6	[13]
(China) X Han (Australia) P Hon	2	6	[9]
(Czech Republic) Kr Plíšková (Russia) E Rodina	6	1	[11]
(Belarus) V Lapko (Luxembourg) M Minella	6	6
(United States) H Carter (United States) E Shibahara	3	0
(United States) T Townsend (Belgium) Y Wickmayer	6	6
2	(Japan) N Hibino (Georgia (country)) O Kalashnikova	2	3

Semifinals
(United States) N Gibbs (United States) A Muhammad	5	3
(Czech Republic) Kr Plíšková (Russia) E Rodina	7	6
(Belarus) V Lapko (Luxembourg) M Minella	2	4
(United States) T Townsend (Belgium) Y Wickmayer	6	6

Final
(Czech Republic) Kr Plíšková (Russia) E Rodina	7^{9}	6
(United States) T Townsend (Belgium) Y Wickmayer	6^{7}	4
