= 2020 Oracle Challenger Series – Indian Wells – Men's doubles =

Tennis event

Indian Wells – Men's doubles
- 2020 Oracle Challenger Series – Indian Wells

Final
- Champions: (United States) Denis Kudla (United States) Thai-Son Kwiatkowski
- Runners-up: (United States) Sebastian Korda (United States) Mitchell Krueger
- Score: 6–3, 2–6, [10–6]

Events
Singles	men	women
Doubles	men	women
- Oracle Challenger Series – Indian Wells

JC Aragone and Marcos Giron were the defending champions but lost in the first round to Gong Maoxin and Hunter Reese.

Denis Kudla and Thai-Son Kwiatkowski won the title after defeating Sebastian Korda and Mitchell Krueger 6–3, 2–6, [10–6] in the final.

== Seeds ==
1. (United States) Nicholas Monroe / (United States) Jackson Withrow (first round)
2. (Australia) Marc Polmans / (Australia) Matt Reid (first round)
3. (Germany) Alexander Zverev / (Germany) Mischa Zverev (first round)
4. (United Kingdom) Luke Bambridge / (United Kingdom) Lloyd Glasspool (quarterfinals)

== Draw ==
Key

- Q = Qualifier
- WC = Wild card
- LL = Lucky loser
- Alt = Alternate
- ITF = ITF entry
- PR = Protected ranking
- SR = Special ranking
- SE = Special exempt
- JE = Junior exempt
- JR = Junior Accelerator Programme entrant
- CO = College Accelerator Programme entrant
- NG = Next Gen Accelerator Program entrant
- w/o = Walkover
- r = Retired
- d = Defaulted

First round
1	(United States) N Monroe (United States) J Withrow	3	7^{7}	[8]
(Japan) T Daniel (Russia) E Donskoy	6	6^{5}	[10]
PR	(Philippines) T Huey (Netherlands) S Verbeek	7^{7}	6
PR	(United States) B Klahn (United States) M McDonald	6^{3}	3
3	(Germany) A Zverev (Germany) M Zverev	6	4	[9]
WC	(United States) S Korda (United States) M Krueger	4	6	[11]
WC	(United States) JC Aragone (United States) M Giron	2	6	[5]
(China) M Gong (United States) H Reese	6	3	[10]
PR	(United States) M Mmoh (United States) J Sock	3	2
WC	(United States) D Kudla (United States) T-S Kwiatkowski	6	6
(Moldova) R Albot (Romania) M Copil	1	5
4	(United Kingdom) L Bambridge (United Kingdom) L Glasspool	6	7
(France) G Barrère (France) L Pouille	6	5	[8]
(Monaco) R Arneodo (Italy) S Caruso	4	7	[10]
(Italy) J Sinner (United States) F Tiafoe	7	3	[10]
2	(Australia) M Polmans (Australia) M Reid	5	6	[5]

Quarterfinals
(Japan) T Daniel (Russia) E Donskoy	2	1
PR	(Philippines) T Huey (Netherlands) S Verbeek	6	6
WC	(United States) S Korda (United States) M Krueger	6	7^{7}
(China) M Gong (United States) H Reese	3	6^{5}
WC	(United States) D Kudla (United States) T-S Kwiatkowski	6	3	[10]
4	(United Kingdom) L Bambridge (United Kingdom) L Glasspool	1	6	[8]
(Monaco) R Arneodo (Italy) S Caruso	6	4	[10]
(Italy) J Sinner (United States) F Tiafoe	0	6	[5]

Semifinals
PR	(Philippines) T Huey (Netherlands) S Verbeek	2	3
WC	(United States) S Korda (United States) M Krueger	6	6
WC	(United States) D Kudla (United States) T-S Kwiatkowski	6	7^{7}
(Monaco) R Arneodo (Italy) S Caruso	3	6^{4}

Final
WC	(United States) S Korda (United States) M Krueger	3	6	[6]
WC	(United States) D Kudla (United States) T-S Kwiatkowski	6	2	[10]
