= 2018 Oracle Challenger Series – Indian Wells – Women's singles =

Indian Wells – Women's singles
- 2018 Oracle Challenger Series – Indian Wells

Final
- Champion: (Italy) Sara Errani
- Runner-up: (Ukraine) Kateryna Bondarenko
- Score: 6–4, 6–2

Events
Singles	men	women
Doubles	men	women
Oracle Challenger Series – Indian Wells	· 2019 →

This was the first edition of the tournament.

Sara Errani won the title, defeating Kateryna Bondarenko in the final 6–4, 6–2.

== Seeds ==
1. (Poland) Magda Linette (second round)
2. (United States) Varvara Lepchenko (second round, retired)
3. (Chinese Taipei) Hsieh Su-wei (second round)
4. (Ukraine) Kateryna Bondarenko (final)
5. (United States) Jennifer Brady (first round)
6. (Italy) Francesca Schiavone (first round)
7. (Russia) Natalia Vikhlyantseva (first round)
8. (China) Duan Yingying (second round)

== Draw ==
=== Key ===
- Q = Qualifier
- WC = Wild card
- LL = Lucky loser
- Alt = Alternate
- SE = Special exempt
- PR = Protected ranking
- ITF = ITF entry
- JE = Junior exempt
- w/o = Walkover
- r = Retired
- d = Defaulted
- SR = Special ranking

=== Finals ===
Semifinals
Q	(Italy) Sara Errani	6	6
Q	(United States) Amanda Anisimova	4	2
4	(Ukraine) Kateryna Bondarenko	7	6
(Australia) Ajla Tomljanović	5	3

Final
Q	(Italy) Sara Errani	6	6
4	(Ukraine) Kateryna Bondarenko	4	2

=== Top half ===
First round
1	(Poland) M Linette	6	4	6
Q	(United States) V Duval	3	6	2
WC	(Russia) V Zvonareva	1	4
WC	(United States) D Collins	6	6
(United States) T Townsend	5	1
(United States) K Ahn	7	6
Q	(Italy) S Errani	6	6
5	(United States) J Brady	2	2
3	(Chinese Taipei) S-w Hsieh	6	7
WC	(United States) A Kratzer	4	5
(Spain) S Sorribes Tormo	3	2
WC	(United States) C Dolehide	6	6
Q	(United Kingdom) N Broady	1	1
Q	(United States) A Anisimova	6	6
(United States) N Gibbs	7	6
7	(Russia) N Vikhlyantseva	5	2

Second round
1	(Poland) M Linette	7	6^{0}	4
WC	(United States) D Collins	5	7^{7}	6
(United States) K Ahn	4	0
Q	(Italy) S Errani	6	6
3	(Chinese Taipei) S-w Hsieh	6^{5}	6^{5}
WC	(United States) C Dolehide	7^{7}	7^{7}
Q	(United States) A Anisimova	6	6
(United States) N Gibbs	4	0

Quarterfinals
WC	(United States) D Collins	4	1
Q	(Italy) S Errani	6	6
WC	(United States) C Dolehide	3	3
Q	(United States) A Anisimova	6	6

Semifinals
Q	(Italy) S Errani	6	6
Q	(United States) A Anisimova	4	2

=== Bottom half ===
First round
6	(Italy) F Schiavone	1	3
(Belgium) Y Wickmayer	6	6
(United States) S Vickery	3	2
(United States) S Kenin	6	6
(United States) A Riske	6	2	2
(Netherlands) R Hogenkamp	4	6	6
(Russia) E Rodina	6	3	4
4	(Ukraine) K Bondarenko	4	6	6
8	(China) Y Duan	7^{7}	6
(Japan) K Nara	6^{5}	3
(Switzerland) V Golubic	6	2	6
Q	(China) Y Wang	1	6	1
(Germany) A Petkovic	6	5	4
(Australia) A Tomljanović	4	7	6
Q	(Japan) M Doi	6^{5}	7	6^{2}
2	(United States) V Lepchenko	7^{7}	5	7^{7}

Second round
(Belgium) Y Wickmayer	6	6
(United States) S Kenin	3	3
(Netherlands) R Hogenkamp	3	0
4	(Ukraine) K Bondarenko	6	6
8	(China) Y Duan	6^{4}	3
(Switzerland) V Golubic	7^{7}	6
(Australia) A Tomljanović	4	6	0
2	(United States) V Lepchenko	6	1	0^{r}

Quarterfinals
(Belgium) Y Wickmayer	3	3
4	(Ukraine) K Bondarenko	6	6
(Switzerland) V Golubic	3	3
(Australia) A Tomljanović	6	6

Semifinals
4	(Ukraine) K Bondarenko	7	6
(Australia) A Tomljanović	5	3

== Qualifying ==
=== Seeds ===
1. (China) Wang Yafan (qualified)
2. (United Kingdom) Naomi Broady (qualified)
3. (Belarus) Vera Lapko (qualifying competition)
4. (Czech Republic) Barbora Krejčíková (first round)
5. (Japan) Risa Ozaki (first round)
6. (South Korea) Jang Su-jeong (qualifying competition)
7. (Italy) Sara Errani (qualified)
8. (Japan) Misaki Doi (qualified)
9. (United States) Amanda Anisimova (qualified)
10. (United States) Julia Boserup (qualifying competition)
11. (United States) Victoria Duval (qualified)
12. (United States) Louisa Chirico (qualifying competition)

=== Qualifiers ===
1. (China) Wang Yafan
2. (United Kingdom) Naomi Broady
3. (Japan) Misaki Doi
4. (Italy) Sara Errani
5. (United States) Victoria Duval
6. (United States) Amanda Anisimova

=== Qualifying draw ===
==== First qualifier ====
First round
1	(China) Wang Yafan	6	6
(United States) Sophie Chang	3	3
(United States) Tori Kinard	0^{r}
12	(United States) Louisa Chirico	4

Qualifying competition
1	(China) Wang Yafan	6	7
12	(United States) Louisa Chirico	3	5

==== Second qualifier ====
First round
2	(United Kingdom) Naomi Broady	6	6
WC	(United States) Lauren Marker	3	3
WC	(United States) Ingrid Neel	1	3
10	(United States) Julia Boserup	6	6

Qualifying competition
2	(United Kingdom) Naomi Broady	6	5	6
10	(United States) Julia Boserup	3	7	3

==== Third qualifier ====
First round
3	(Belarus) Vera Lapko	6	6
(United States) Allie Kiick	1	0
(United States) Chiara Scholl	1	0
8	(Japan) Misaki Doi	6	6

Qualifying competition
3	(Belarus) Vera Lapko	6^{1}	3
8	(Japan) Misaki Doi	7^{7}	6

==== Fourth qualifier ====
First round
4	(Czech Republic) Barbora Krejčíková	4	3
(United States) Claire Liu	6	6
(United States) Danielle Lao	4	2
7	(Italy) Sara Errani	6	6

Qualifying competition
(United States) Claire Liu	3	6	3
7	(Italy) Sara Errani	6	3	6

==== Fifth qualifier ====
First round
5	(Japan) Risa Ozaki	4	2
(United States) Francesca Di Lorenzo	6	6
WC	(United States) Pamela Montez	3	5
11	(United States) Victoria Duval	6	7

Qualifying competition
(United States) Francesca Di Lorenzo	3	2
11	(United States) Victoria Duval	6	6

==== Sixth qualifier ====
First round
6	(South Korea) Jang Su-jeong	6	6
(United States) Julia Elbaba	0	3
(Ukraine) Valeriya Strakhova	0	1
9	(United States) Amanda Anisimova	6	6

Qualifying competition
6	(South Korea) Jang Su-jeong	3	6	0
9	(United States) Amanda Anisimova	6	3	6
