= 2020 Oracle Challenger Series – Indian Wells =

- Date: March 2–8
- Edition: 3rd
- Category: ATP Challenger Tour; WTA 125K series
- Draw: 48S / 16D
- Prize money: $162,480+H (ATP) $162,480 (WTA)
- Surface: Hard, outdoor
- Location: Indian Wells, United States
- Venue: Indian Wells Tennis Garden

Champions

Men's singles
- (United States) Steve Johnson

Women's singles
- (Romania) Irina-Camelia Begu

Men's doubles
- (United States) Denis Kudla / (United States) Thai-Son Kwiatkowski

Women's doubles
- (United States) Asia Muhammad / (United States) Taylor Townsend
- Oracle Challenger Series – Indian Wells

The 2020 Oracle Challenger Series – Indian Wells was a professional tennis tournament played on outdoor hard courts. It was the third edition of the tournament, and part of the 2020 ATP Challenger Tour and the 2020 WTA 125K series. It took place from March 2–8, 2020 in Indian Wells, United States.

== Point distribution ==
Event	W	F	SF	QF	Round of 16	Round of 32	Round of 48	Q	Q1
Men's singles	125	75	45	25	10	5	0	0	0
Men's doubles	125	75	45	25	0	—N/a	—N/a	—N/a	—N/a
Women's singles	160	95	57	29	15	8	1	4	1
Women's doubles	160	95	57	29	1	—N/a	—N/a	—N/a	—N/a

== Men's singles main-draw entrants ==
=== Seeds ===
Country	Player	Rank^{1}	Seed
FRA	Ugo Humbert	43	1
FRA	Lucas Pouille	57	2
~~GBR~~	~~Cameron Norrie~~	~~58~~	~~3~~
MDA	Radu Albot	69	4
USA	Steve Johnson	73	5
ITA	Jannik Sinner	75	6
JPN	Yūichi Sugita	81	7
USA	Frances Tiafoe	82	8
FRA	Grégoire Barrère	90	9
ITA	Salvatore Caruso	100	10
USA	Denis Kudla	106	11
JPN	Taro Daniel	110	12
RUS	Evgeny Donskoy	114	13
USA	Marcos Giron	115	14
AUS	Christopher O'Connell	116	15
GER	Peter Gojowczyk	117	16

- ^{1} Rankings are as of 24 February 2020.

=== Other entrants ===
The following players received wildcards into the singles main draw:

- (Moldova) Radu Albot
- (United States) Brandon Holt
- (France) Ugo Humbert
- (United States) Govind Nanda
- (United States) Keegan Smith

The following players received entry into the singles main draw using protected rankings:

- (Australia) Blake Mott
- (United States) Raymond Sarmiento
- (United States) Jack Sock

The following player received entry into the singles main draw as an alternate:

- (Monaco) Romain Arneodo

The following players received entry from the qualifying draw:

- (United States) Gage Brymer
- (Netherlands) Sem Verbeek

== Women's singles main-draw entrants ==
=== Seeds ===
Country	Player	Rank^{1}	Seed
CZE	Kateřina Siniaková	55	1
RUS	Anna Blinkova	59	2
USA	Bernarda Pera	63	3
USA	Taylor Townsend	67	4
GER	Laura Siegemund	68	5
JPN	Nao Hibino	71	6
USA	Madison Brengle	76	7
CHN	Zhu Lin	77	8
USA	Jessica Pegula	79	9
ROU	Patricia Maria Țig	81	10
PUR	Monica Puig	84	11
USA	Christina McHale	86	12
JPN	Misaki Doi	89	13
USA	Kristie Ahn	93	14
AUS	Samantha Stosur	96	15
RUS	Varvara Gracheva	101	16

- ^{1} Rankings are as of 24 February 2019.

=== Other entrants ===
The following players received wildcards into the singles main draw:

- (United States) Hailey Baptiste
- (United States) Claire Liu
- (United States) Jamie Loeb
- (United States) CoCo Vandeweghe

The following players received entry into the singles main draw using protected rankings:

- (Germany) Mona Barthel
- (United Kingdom) Katie Boulter
- (United States) Irina Falconi
- (Russia) Vera Zvonareva

The following players received entry from the qualifying draw:

- (United States) Danielle Lao
- (United States) Asia Muhammad

=== Withdrawals ===
Before the tournament

- (United States) Allie Kiick → replaced by (United States) Sachia Vickery
- (United States) Whitney Osuigwe → replaced by (Paraguay) Verónica Cepede Royg

During the tournament

- (Russia) Vera Zvonareva

== Women's doubles main-draw entrants ==
=== Seeds ===
Country	Player	Country	Player	Rank^{1}	Seed
CHN	Duan Yingying	JPN	Nao Hibino	87	1
JPN	Makoto Ninomiya	CHN	Yang Zhaoxuan	108	2
AUS	Samantha Stosur	BEL	Yanina Wickmayer	121	3
USA	Asia Muhammad	USA	Taylor Townsend	140	4

- ^{1} Rankings as of 24 February 2020

=== Other entrants ===
The following pair received a wildcard into the doubles main draw:

- (United States) Hailey Baptiste / (United States) Claire Liu

== Champions ==
=== Men's singles ===
- (United States) Steve Johnson def. (United States) Jack Sock 6–4, 6–4.

=== Women's singles ===
- (Romania) Irina-Camelia Begu def. (Japan) Misaki Doi, 6–3, 6–3

=== Men's doubles ===
- (United States) Denis Kudla / (United States) Thai-Son Kwiatkowski def. (United States) Sebastian Korda / (United States) Mitchell Krueger 6–3, 2–6, [10–6].

=== Women's doubles ===
- (United States) Asia Muhammad / (United States) Taylor Townsend def. (United States) Caty McNally / (United States) Jessica Pegula, 6–4, 6–4
