= Oracle Challenger Series – Indian Wells =

Defunct tennis tournament
- Event name: Oracle Challenger Series – Indian Wells
- Location: Indian Wells, California, United States
- Venue: Indian Wells Tennis Garden
- Surface: Hard
- Website: oraclechallengerseries.com

Current champions (2020)
- Men's singles: (United States) Steve Johnson
- Women's singles: (Romania) Irina-Camelia Begu
- Men's doubles: (United States) Denis Kudla (United States) Thai-Son Kwiatkowski
- Women's doubles: (United States) Taylor Townsend (United States) Asia Muhammad
ATP Tour
- Category: ATP Challenger Tour
- Draw: 48S / 4Q / 16D
- Prize money: $162,480+H
WTA Tour
- Category: WTA 125K series
- Draw: 48S / 4Q / 16D
- Prize money: $162,480

The Oracle Challenger Series – Indian Wells is a professional tennis tournament played on hard courts. It is currently part of the ATP Challenger Tour and the WTA 125K series. It is held annually in Indian Wells, California, United States since 2018. The two American men and two American women with the most points in the series receive wild cards to their respective singles events at the Indian Wells Masters.

== Past finals ==
=== Men's singles ===
Year	Champion	Runner-up	Score
2020	(United States) Steve Johnson	(United States) Jack Sock	6–4, 6–4
2019	(United Kingdom) Kyle Edmund	(Russia) Andrey Rublev	6–3, 6–2
2018	(Slovakia) Martin Kližan	(Barbados) Darian King	6–3, 6–3

=== Women's singles ===
Year	Champion	Runner-up	Score
2020	(Romania) Irina-Camelia Begu	(Japan) Misaki Doi	6–3, 6–3
2019	(Switzerland) Viktorija Golubic	(United States) Jennifer Brady	3–6, 7–5, 6–3
2018	(Italy) Sara Errani	(Ukraine) Kateryna Bondarenko	6–4, 6–2

=== Men's doubles ===
Year	Champions	Runners-up	Score
2020	(United States) Denis Kudla (United States) Thai-Son Kwiatkowski	(United States) Sebastian Korda (United States) Mitchell Krueger	6–3, 2–6, [10–6]
2019	(United States) JC Aragone (United States) Marcos Giron	(Barbados) Darian King (United States) Hunter Reese	6–4, 6–4
2018	(United States) Austin Krajicek (United States) Jackson Withrow	(United States) Evan King (United States) Nathan Pasha	6–7^{(3–7)}, 6–1, [11–9]

=== Women's doubles ===
Year	Champions	Runners-up	Score
2020	(United States) Asia Muhammad (United States) Taylor Townsend (2)	(United States) Caty McNally (United States) Jessica Pegula	6–4, 6–4
2019	(Czech Republic) Kristýna Plíšková (Russia) Evgeniya Rodina	(United States) Taylor Townsend (Belgium) Yanina Wickmayer	7–6^{(9–7)}, 6–4
2018	(United States) Taylor Townsend (Belgium) Yanina Wickmayer	(United States) Jennifer Brady (United States) Vania King	6–4, 6–4
