= 2019 Oracle Challenger Series – Indian Wells =

- Date: February 25 – March 3
- Edition: 2nd
- Category: ATP Challenger Tour; WTA 125K series
- Draw: 48S / 16D
- Prize money: $162,480+H (ATP) $162,480 (WTA)
- Surface: Hard, outdoor
- Location: Indian Wells, United States
- Venue: Indian Wells Tennis Garden

Champions

Men's singles
- (United Kingdom) Kyle Edmund

Women's singles
- (Switzerland) Viktorija Golubic

Men's doubles
- (United States) JC Aragone / (United States) Marcos Giron

Women's doubles
- (Czech Republic) Kristýna Plíšková / (Russia) Evgeniya Rodina
- Oracle Challenger Series – Indian Wells

The 2019 Oracle Challenger Series – Indian Wells is a professional tennis tournament played on outdoor hard courts. It's the second edition of the tournament, which is part of the 2019 ATP Challenger Tour and the 2019 WTA 125K series. It took place from February 25 – March 3, 2019 in Indian Wells, United States.

== Point distribution ==
Event	W	F	SF	QF	Round of 16	Round of 32	Round of 48	Q	Q1
Men's singles	125	75	45	25	10	5	0	0	0
Men's doubles	125	75	45	25	0	—N/a	—N/a	—N/a	—N/a
Women's singles	160	95	57	29	15	8	1	4	1
Women's doubles	160	95	57	29	1	—N/a	—N/a	—N/a	—N/a

== Men's singles main-draw entrants ==
=== Seeds ===
Country	Player	Rank^{1}	Seed
GBR	Kyle Edmund	28	1
SRB	Filip Krajinović	77	2
~~MDA~~	~~Radu Albot~~	~~82~~	~~3~~
RUS	Evgeny Donskoy	96	4
RSA	Lloyd Harris	98	5
UZB	Denis Istomin	102	6
RUS	Andrey Rublev	115	7
GER	Yannick Maden	116	8
USA	Jared Donaldson	120	9
SUI	Henri Laaksonen	121	10
CAN	Peter Polansky	122	11
SRB	Miomir Kecmanović	125	12
AUS	Alex Bolt	129	13
TPE	Jason Jung	131	14
SVK	Lukáš Lacko	133	15
CZE	Lukáš Rosol	138	16

- ^{1} Rankings are as of 18 February 2019.

=== Other entrants ===
The following players received wildcards into the singles main draw:

- (United States) Jenson Brooksby
- (United States) Maxime Cressy
- (United Kingdom) Kyle Edmund
- (United States) Zane Khan
- (United States) Brandon Nakashima

The following player received entry into the singles main draw as an alternate:

- (United States) Thai-Son Kwiatkowski

The following players received entry from the qualifying draw:

- (United States) Ulises Blanch
- (United States) Michael Redlicki

The following player received entry as a lucky loser:

- (United States) Martin Redlicki

== Women's singles main-draw entrants ==
=== Seeds ===
Country	Player	Rank^{1}	Seed
CHN	Wang Qiang	18	1
USA	Alison Riske	51	2
BLR	Vera Lapko	60	3
FRA	Kristina Mladenovic	67	4
RUS	Evgeniya Rodina	71	5
ESP	Sara Sorribes Tormo	76	6
EST	Kaia Kanepi	84	7
CZE	Kristýna Plíšková	90	8
USA	Taylor Townsend	91	9
USA	Jessica Pegula	92	10
KAZ	Zarina Diyas	94	11
USA	Madison Brengle	95	12
LUX	Mandy Minella	99	13
SUI	Viktorija Golubic	101	14
CHN	Zhu Lin	107	15
ROU	Sorana Cîrstea	108	16

- ^{1} Rankings are as of 18 February 2019.

=== Other entrants ===
The following players received wildcards into the singles main draw:

- (United States) Coco Gauff
- (United States) Jamie Loeb
- (United States) Caty McNally
- (United States) Katie Volynets
- (China) Wang Qiang

The following players received entry from the qualifying draw:

- (United States) Kayla Day
- (United States) Ena Shibahara

=== Withdrawals ===
Before the tournament

- (Spain) Paula Badosa Gibert → replaced by (Bulgaria) Sesil Karatantcheva
- (Slovenia) Polona Hercog → replaced by (United States) Asia Muhammad
- (Thailand) Luksika Kumkhum → replaced by (United States) Whitney Osuigwe
- (Poland) Magda Linette → replaced by (Australia) Priscilla Hon
- (China) Peng Shuai → replaced by (United States) Francesca Di Lorenzo
- (Netherlands) Arantxa Rus → replaced by (United States) Kristie Ahn
- (Slovakia) Magdaléna Rybáriková → replaced by (China) Han Xinyun
- (Slovakia) Anna Karolína Schmiedlová → replaced by (United States) Allie Kiick
- (Australia) Samantha Stosur → replaced by (United States) Claire Liu

== Women's doubles main-draw entrants ==
=== Seeds ===
Country	Player	Country	Player	Rank^{1}	Seed
HUN	Fanny Stollár	GBR	Heather Watson	134	1
JPN	Nao Hibino	GEO	Oksana Kalashnikova	159	2
SRB	Olga Danilović	UKR	Nadiia Kichenok	162	3
ROU	Sorana Cîrstea	ESP	Sara Sorribes Tormo	171	4

- ^{1} Rankings as of 18 February 2019

=== Other entrants ===
The following pair received wildcard into the doubles main draw:

- (United States) Sanaz Marand / (United States) Whitney Osuigwe

== Champions ==
=== Men's singles ===
- (United Kingdom) Kyle Edmund def. (Russia) Andrey Rublev 6–3, 6–2.

=== Women's singles ===
- (Switzerland) Viktorija Golubic def. (United States) Jennifer Brady 3–6, 7–5, 6–3

=== Men's doubles ===
- (United States) JC Aragone / (United States) Marcos Giron def. (Barbados) Darian King / (United States) Hunter Reese 6–4, 6–4.

=== Women's doubles ===
- (Czech Republic) Kristýna Plíšková / (Russia) Evgeniya Rodina def. (United States) Taylor Townsend / (Belgium) Yanina Wickmayer, 7–6^{(9–7)}, 6–4
