= 2016 WTA 125K series =

Tennis circuit

Details
- Duration: March 14, 2016 – November 21, 2016
- Edition: 5th
- Tournaments: 8

Achievements (singles)

The WTA 125K series is the secondary professional tennis circuit organised by the Women's Tennis Association. The 2016 WTA 125K series calendar consists of eight tournaments, each with a total prize fund of $125,000. After 2015, the Nanchang event was upgraded to a WTA International level tournament, and with new events starting in San Antonio, West Hempstead and Bol. The planned tournament in West Hempstead was then cancelled, and the tournament scheduled to take place in Carlsbad, California was moved to Oahu, Hawaii. Following the death of the Thai king Bhumibol Abdulyadej, the event due to take place in Hua Hin was also cancelled, in accordance with Thai tradition that sporting events cannot take place in the month after a monarch's death.

== Schedule ==
Week of	Tournament	Champions	Runners-up	Semifinalists	Quarterfinalists
March 14	San Antonio Open; San Antonio, United States $125,000 – hard – 32S/8D; Singles – Doubles	(Japan) Misaki Doi; 6–4, 6–2	(Germany) Anna-Lena Friedsam	(United States) Alison Riske (Bulgaria) Tsvetana Pironkova	(Australia) Daria Gavrilova (Croatia) Ana Konjuh (Croatia) Donna Vekić (United States) Samantha Crawford
March 14	San Antonio Open; San Antonio, United States $125,000 – hard – 32S/8D; Singles – Doubles	(Germany) Anna-Lena Grönefeld (United States) Nicole Melichar; 6–1, 6–3	(Poland) Klaudia Jans-Ignacik (Australia) Anastasia Rodionova	(United States) Alison Riske (Bulgaria) Tsvetana Pironkova	(Australia) Daria Gavrilova (Croatia) Ana Konjuh (Croatia) Donna Vekić (United States) Samantha Crawford
May 9	Empire State Open; West Hempstead, United States $125,000 – Red clay – 32S/16Q/16D	cancelled			
May 30	Bol Open; Bol, Croatia $125,000 – clay – 32S/6Q/12D; Singles – Doubles	(Luxembourg) Mandy Minella; 6–2, 6–3	(Slovenia) Polona Hercog	(Japan) Nao Hibino (Croatia) Ana Konjuh	(Slovakia) Kristína Kučová (Switzerland) Stefanie Vögele (Croatia) Tereza Mrdeža (New Zealand) Marina Erakovic
May 30	Bol Open; Bol, Croatia $125,000 – clay – 32S/6Q/12D; Singles – Doubles	(Switzerland) Xenia Knoll (Croatia) Petra Martić; 6–3, 6–2	(Romania) Raluca Olaru (Turkey) İpek Soylu	(Japan) Nao Hibino (Croatia) Ana Konjuh	(Slovakia) Kristína Kučová (Switzerland) Stefanie Vögele (Croatia) Tereza Mrdeža (New Zealand) Marina Erakovic
September 5	Dalian Women's Tennis Open; Dalian, China $125,000 – hard – 32S/16Q/16D; Singles – Doubles	(Czech Republic) Kristýna Plíšková; 7–5, 4–6, 2–5 ret.	(Japan) Misa Eguchi	(United States) Grace Min (China) Han Xinyun	(China) Wang Qiang (Israel) Julia Glushko (China) Wang Yafan (Serbia) Aleksandra Krunić
September 5	Dalian Women's Tennis Open; Dalian, China $125,000 – hard – 32S/16Q/16D; Singles – Doubles	(Chinese Taipei) Lee Ya-hsuan (Japan) Kotomi Takahata; 6–2, 6–1	(Thailand) Nicha Lertpitaksinchai (Indonesia) Jessy Rompies	(United States) Grace Min (China) Han Xinyun	(China) Wang Qiang (Israel) Julia Glushko (China) Wang Yafan (Serbia) Aleksandra Krunić
November 7	Hua Hin Championships; Hua Hin, Thailand $125,000 – hard – 32S/16Q/16D	Cancelled due to the death of Bhumibol Adulyadej			
November 14	OEC Taipei WTA Challenger; Taipei, Taiwan $125,000 – carpet (indoor) – 32S/16Q/16D; Singles – Doubles	(Russia) Evgeniya Rodina; 6–4, 6–3	(Chinese Taipei) Chang Kai-chen	(New Zealand) Marina Erakovic (Belarus) Olga Govortsova	(Thailand) Luksika Kumkhum (Germany) Tatjana Maria (Australia) Ashleigh Barty (Russia) Vitalia Diatchenko
November 14	OEC Taipei WTA Challenger; Taipei, Taiwan $125,000 – carpet (indoor) – 32S/16Q/16D; Singles – Doubles	(Russia) Natela Dzalamidze (Russia) Veronika Kudermetova; 4–6, 6–3, [10–5]	(Chinese Taipei) Chang Kai-chen (Chinese Taipei) Chuang Chia-jung	(New Zealand) Marina Erakovic (Belarus) Olga Govortsova	(Thailand) Luksika Kumkhum (Germany) Tatjana Maria (Australia) Ashleigh Barty (Russia) Vitalia Diatchenko
November 14	Open de Limoges; Limoges, France $125,000 – hard (indoor) – 32S/16Q/8D; Singles – Doubles	(Russia) Ekaterina Alexandrova; 6–4, 6–0	(France) Caroline Garcia	(Russia) Natalia Vikhlyantseva (France) Alizé Cornet	(Croatia) Donna Vekić (Germany) Tamara Korpatsch (Belgium) Maryna Zanevska (Switzerland) Stefanie Vögele
November 14	Open de Limoges; Limoges, France $125,000 – hard (indoor) – 32S/16Q/8D; Singles – Doubles	(Luxembourg) Mandy Minella (Belgium) Elise Mertens; 6–4, 6–4	(United Kingdom) Anna Smith (Czech Republic) Renata Voráčová	(Russia) Natalia Vikhlyantseva (France) Alizé Cornet	(Croatia) Donna Vekić (Germany) Tamara Korpatsch (Belgium) Maryna Zanevska (Switzerland) Stefanie Vögele
November 21	Hawaii Tennis Open; Honolulu, United States $125,000 – hard – 32S/16Q/8D; Singles – Doubles	(United States) Catherine Bellis; 6–4, 6–2	(China) Zhang Shuai	(Russia) Evgeniya Rodina (United States) Jacqueline Cako	(United States) Samantha Crawford (United States) Sachia Vickery (Spain) Sara Sorribes Tormo (Germany) Sabine Lisicki
November 21	Hawaii Tennis Open; Honolulu, United States $125,000 – hard – 32S/16Q/8D; Singles – Doubles	(Japan) Eri Hozumi (Japan) Miyu Kato; 6–7^{(3–7)}, 6–3, [10–8]	(United States) Nicole Gibbs (United States) Asia Muhammad	(Russia) Evgeniya Rodina (United States) Jacqueline Cako	(United States) Samantha Crawford (United States) Sachia Vickery (Spain) Sara Sorribes Tormo (Germany) Sabine Lisicki

== Statistical information ==
These tables present the number of singles (S) and doubles (D) titles won by each player and each nation during the season. The players/nations are sorted by: 1) total number of titles (a doubles title won by two players representing the same nation counts as only one win for the nation); 2) a singles > doubles hierarchy; 3) alphabetical order (by family names for players).

To avoid confusion and double counting, these tables should be updated only after an event is completed.

=== Titles won by player ===
Total	Player	S	D	S	D
2	Mandy Minella (LUX)	●	●	1	1
1	Ekaterina Alexandrova (RUS)	●		1	0
1	Catherine Bellis (USA)	●		1	0
1	Misaki Doi (JPN)	●		1	0
1	Kristýna Plíšková (CZE)	●		1	0
1	Evgeniya Rodina (RUS)	●		1	0
1	Natela Dzalamidze (RUS)		●	0	1
1	Anna-Lena Grönefeld (GER)		●	0	1
1	Eri Hozumi (JPN)		●	0	1
1	Miyu Kato (JPN)		●	0	1
1	Xenia Knoll (SUI)		●	0	1
1	Veronika Kudermetova (RUS)		●	0	1
1	Lee Ya-hsuan (TPE)		●	0	1
1	Petra Martić (CRO)		●	0	1
1	Nicole Melichar (USA)		●	0	1
1	Elise Mertens (BEL)		●	0	1
1	Kotomi Takahata (JPN)		●	0	1

=== Titles won by nation ===
Total	Nation	S	D
3	Russia (RUS)	2	1
3	Japan (JPN)	1	2
2	Luxembourg (LUX)	1	1
2	United States (USA)	1	1
1	Czech Republic (CZE)	1	0
1	Belgium (BEL)	0	1
1	Chinese Taipei (TPE)	0	1
1	Croatia (CRO)	0	1
1	Germany (GER)	0	1
1	Switzerland (SUI)	0	1

== Points distribution ==
Event	W	F	SF	QF	R16	R32	Q	Q2	Q1
Singles	160	95	57	29	15	1	6	4	1
Doubles (16D)	160	95	57	29	1	—	—	—	—
