= 2016 San Antonio Open =

- Date: 14–19 March
- Edition: 1st
- Category: WTA 125K series
- Prize money: $125,000
- Surface: Hard
- Location: San Antonio, United States

Champions

Singles
- (Japan) Misaki Doi

Doubles
- (Germany) Anna-Lena Grönefeld / (United States) Nicole Melichar
San Antonio Open	· 2017 →

The 2016 San Antonio Open was a professional tennis tournament played on outdoor hard courts. It was the 1st edition of the tournament as part of the 2016 WTA 125K series. It took place in San Antonio, United States, on 12–19 March 2016.

== Singles entrants ==
=== Seeds ===
Country	Player	Rank^{1}	Seed
AUS	Daria Gavrilova	33	1
ROU	Irina-Camelia Begu	35	2
LAT	Jeļena Ostapenko	40	3
BEL	Yanina Wickmayer	47	4
BRA	Teliana Pereira	50	5
JPN	Misaki Doi	55	6
BEL	Kirsten Flipkens	59	7
JPN	Nao Hibino	60	8

- ^{1} Rankings as of 7 March 2016.

=== Other entrants ===
The following players received wildcards into the singles main draw:

- (Romania) Irina-Camelia Begu
- (United States) Catherine Bellis
- (Australia) Casey Dellacqua
- (Australia) Daria Gavrilova
- (Brazil) Teliana Pereira
- (Greece) Maria Sakkari

=== Withdrawals ===
Before the tournament

- (Italy) Karin Knapp →replaced by Lauren Davis
- (Serbia) Bojana Jovanovski →replaced by Naomi Broady

== Doubles entrants ==
=== Seeds ===
Country	Player	Country	Player	Rank^{1}	Seed
AUS	Casey Dellacqua	CRO	Darija Jurak	46	1
TPE	Chuang Chia-jung	CHN	Liang Chen	72	2
POL	Klaudia Jans-Ignacik	AUS	Anastasia Rodionova	89	3
GER	Anna-Lena Grönefeld	USA	Nicole Melichar	106	4

- ^{1} Rankings as of 7 March 2016.

=== Other entrants ===
The following pair received a wildcard into the doubles main draw:

- (United States) Ashley Weinhold / (United States) Caitlin Whoriskey

== Champions ==
=== Singles ===
- (Japan) Misaki Doi def. (Germany) Anna-Lena Friedsam, 6–4, 6–2

=== Doubles ===
- (Germany) Anna-Lena Grönefeld / (United States) Nicole Melichar def. (Poland) Klaudia Jans-Ignacik / (Australia) Anastasia Rodionova, 6–1, 6–3
