= 2017 Hawaii Tennis Open =

- Date: 20–26 November
- Edition: 2nd
- Category: WTA 125K series
- Prize money: $115,000
- Surface: Hard
- Location: Honolulu, United States
- Venue: Central Oahu Regional Park

Champions

Singles
- (China) Zhang Shuai

Doubles
- (Chinese Taipei) Hsieh Shu-ying / (Chinese Taipei) Hsieh Su-wei
| ← 2016 · | Hawaii Tennis Open | · 2018 → |

The 2017 Hawaii Tennis Open was a professional tennis tournament played on outdoor hard courts. It was the second edition of the tournament and part of the 2017 WTA 125K series, offering a total of $115,000 in prize money. It took place in Waipio near Honolulu, United States, on 20–26 November 2017.

== Singles main draw entrants ==
=== Seeds ===
| Country | Player | Rank^{1} | Seed |
|---|---|---|---|
| CHN | Zhang Shuai | 36 | 1 |
| TPE | Hsieh Su-wei | 84 | 2 |
| RUS | Evgeniya Rodina | 86 | 3 |
| JPN | Kurumi Nara | 102 | 4 |
| JPN | Risa Ozaki | 115 | 5 |
| USA | Sachia Vickery | 118 | 6 |
| JPN | Misaki Doi | 121 | 7 |
| CHN | Han Xinyun | 131 | 8 |

- ^{1} Rankings as of 13 November 2017.

=== Other entrants ===
The following player received wildcards into the singles main draw:

- (United States) Michaela Gordon
- (United States) Allie Kiick
- (Russia) Anastasia Pivovarova
- (United States) Taysia Rogers
- (China) Zhang Shuai

The following players received entry from the qualifying draw:

- (South Korea) Han Na-lae
- (Japan) Haruka Kaji
- (United States) Claire Liu
- (Canada) Katherine Sebov

==== Withdrawals ====
Before the tournament

- (United States) Catherine Bellis →replaced by (Japan) Miharu Imanishi
- (United States) Louisa Chirico →replaced by (Japan) Ayano Shimizu
- (United States) Kayla Day →replaced by (United States) Usue Maitane Arconada
- (Italy) Francesca Schiavone →replaced by (United States) Danielle Lao

== Doubles entrants ==
=== Seeds ===
| Country | Player | Country | Player | Rank^{1} | Seed |
|---|---|---|---|---|---|
| CHN | Han Xinyun | JPN | Makoto Ninomiya | 121 | 1 |
| JPN | Eri Hozumi | USA | Asia Muhammad | 145 | 2 |
| NED | Lesley Kerkhove | BLR | Lidziya Marozava | 149 | 3 |
| USA | Usue Maitane Arconada | USA | Kaitlyn Christian | 412 | 4 |

- ^{1} Rankings as of 13 November 2017.

== Champions ==
=== Singles ===
- (China) Zhang Shuai def. (South Korea) Jang Su-jeong 0–6, 6–2, 6–3

=== Doubles ===
- (Chinese Taipei) Hsieh Shu-ying / (Chinese Taipei) Hsieh Su-wei def. (Japan) Eri Hozumi / (United States) Asia Muhammad, 6–1, 7–6^{(7–3)}
