= 2016 Hawaii Tennis Open =

- Date: 21–27 November
- Edition: 1st
- Category: WTA 125K series
- Prize money: $115,000
- Surface: Hard
- Location: Honolulu, United States
- Venue: Central Oahu Regional Park

Champions

Singles
- (United States) Catherine Bellis

Doubles
- (Japan) Eri Hozumi / (Japan) Miyu Kato
Hawaii Tennis Open	· 2017 →

The 2016 Hawaii Tennis Open was a professional tennis tournament played on outdoor hard courts. It was the 1st edition of the tournament and part of the 2016 WTA 125K series, offering a total of $115,000 in prize money. It took place in Honolulu, United States, on 21–27 November 2016.

== Singles main draw entrants ==
=== Seeds ===
Country	Player	Rank^{1}	Seed
CHN	Zhang Shuai	23	1
USA	Nicole Gibbs	76	2
GRE	Maria Sakkari	89	3
USA	Catherine Bellis	90	4
GER	Sabine Lisicki	91	5
RUS	Evgeniya Rodina	104	6
ESP	Sara Sorribes Tormo	106	7
USA	Samantha Crawford	111	8

- ^{1} Rankings as of 14 November 2016.

=== Other entrants ===
The following player received a wildcard into the singles main draw:

- (United States) Usue Maitane Arconada
- (United States) Ingrid Neel
- (Hungary) Fanny Stollár
- (United Kingdom) Katie Swan
- (China) Zhang Shuai

The following players received entry from the qualifying draw:

- (United States) Michaela Gordon
- (China) Zhang Nannan

== Doubles entrants ==
=== Seeds ===
Country	Player	Country	Player	Rank^{1}	Seed
JPN	Eri Hozumi	JPN	Miyu Kato	111	1
PAR	Verónica Cepede Royg	USA	Nicole Melichar	183	2
USA	Nicole Gibbs	USA	Asia Muhammad	188	3
JPN	Hiroko Kuwata	USA	Jamie Loeb	275	4

- ^{1} Rankings as of 14 November 2016.

=== Other entrants ===
The following pair received a wildcard into the doubles main draw:

- (China) Wen Xin / (China) Zhang Nannan

== Champions ==
=== Singles ===
- (United States) Catherine Bellis def. (China) Zhang Shuai, 6–4, 6–2

=== Doubles ===
- (Japan) Eri Hozumi / (Japan) Miyu Kato def. (United States) Nicole Gibbs / (United States) Asia Muhammad, 6–7^{(3–7)}, 6–3, [10–8]
