= 2017 Hawaii Tennis Open – Singles =

Singles
- 2017 Hawaii Tennis Open

Final
- Champion: (China) Zhang Shuai
- Runner-up: (South Korea) Jang Su-jeong
- Score: 0–6, 6–2, 6–3

Events
Singles	Doubles
- Hawaii Tennis Open

Catherine Bellis was the defending champion but withdrew before the competition began.

Zhang Shuai won the title, defeating Jang Su-jeong in the final, 0–6, 6–2, 6–3.

== Seeds ==
1. (China) Zhang Shuai (champion)
2. (Chinese Taipei) Hsieh Su-wei (first round)
3. (Russia) Evgeniya Rodina (quarterfinals)
4. (Japan) Kurumi Nara (first round)
5. (Japan) Risa Ozaki (first round)
6. (United States) Sachia Vickery (second round, retired)
7. (Japan) Misaki Doi (second round)
8. (China) Han Xinyun (first round)

== Draw ==
Key

- Q = Qualifier
- WC = Wild card
- LL = Lucky loser
- Alt = Alternate
- ITF = ITF entry
- PR = Protected ranking
- SR = Special ranking
- SE = Special exempt
- JE = Junior exempt
- JR = Junior Accelerator Programme entrant
- CO = College Accelerator Programme entrant
- NG = Next Gen Accelerator Program entrant
- w/o = Walkover
- r = Retired
- d = Defaulted

=== Finals ===
Semifinals
1/WC	(China) Zhang Shuai	6	6
(Sweden) Rebecca Peterson	2	2
(United States) Julia Boserup	3	6	3
(South Korea) Jang Su-jeong	6	3	6

Final
1/WC	(China) Zhang Shuai	0	6	6
(South Korea) Jang Su-jeong	6	2	3

=== Top half ===
First round
1/WC	(China) S Zhang	6	6
WC	(United States) T Rogers	1	0
Q	(Japan) H Kaji	5	1
(Japan) E Hozumi	7	6
Q	(Canada) K Sebov	1	6	5
(United States) J Cako	6	2	7
(Russia) V Diatchenko	6	6
5	(Japan) R Ozaki	1	0
4	(Japan) K Nara	2	2
(Croatia) A Tomljanović	6	6
(United States) D Lao	6	6
Q	(United States) C Liu	4	4
(Sweden) R Peterson	7^{7}	6
(United States) UM Arconada	6^{0}	4
(United States) D Collins	4	6^{2}
6	(United States) S Vickery	6	7^{7}

Second round
1/WC	(China) S Zhang	4	6	6
(Japan) E Hozumi	6	4	3
(United States) J Cako	2	6	1
(Russia) V Diatchenko	6	4	6
(Croatia) A Tomljanović	2	6	6
(United States) D Lao	6	3	1
(Sweden) R Peterson	6	4
6	(United States) S Vickery	2	2^{r}

Quarterfinals
1/WC	(China) S Zhang	6	4
(Russia) V Diatchenko	2	1^{r}
(Croatia) A Tomljanović	5	6^{3}
(Sweden) R Peterson	7	7^{7}

Semifinals
1/WC	(China) S Zhang	6	6
(Sweden) R Peterson	2	2

=== Bottom half ===
First round
7	(Japan) M Doi	4	7^{7}	7^{7}
(United States) A Muhammad	6	6^{3}	6^{3}
(Italy) S Errani	7^{7}	4	3
(United States) J Boserup	6^{5}	6	6
(Netherlands) L Kerkhove	5	6	6
WC	(United States) M Gordon	7	3	1
WC	(Russia) A Pivovarova	3	6	6^{6}
3	(Russia) E Rodina	6	1	7^{8}
8	(China) X Han	5	4
WC	(United States) A Kiick	7	6
(Japan) M Imanishi	6	6
(Japan) A Shimizu	2	2
Q	(South Korea) N-l Han	4	0
(South Korea) S-j Jang	6	6
(United States) A Anisimova	6	6
2	(Chinese Taipei) S-w Hsieh	0	1

Second round
7	(Japan) M Doi	2	3
(United States) J Boserup	6	6
(Netherlands) L Kerkhove	3	6^{4}
3	(Russia) E Rodina	6	7^{7}
WC	(United States) A Kiick	6	5	3
(Japan) M Imanishi	2	7	6
(South Korea) S-j Jang	4	6	6
(United States) A Anisimova	6	4	4

Quarterfinals
(United States) J Boserup	6	3	6
3	(Russia) E Rodina	1	6	1
(Japan) M Imanishi	1	3
(South Korea) S-j Jang	6	6

Semifinals
(United States) J Boserup	3	6	3
(South Korea) S-j Jang	6	3	6

== Qualifying ==
=== Seeds ===
1. (South Korea) Han Na-lae (qualified)
2. (United States) Claire Liu (qualified)
3. (Canada) Katherine Sebov (qualified)
4. (Japan) Mari Osaka (qualifying competition)
5. (Serbia) Jovana Jakšić (qualifying competition)
6. (Japan) Haruka Kaji (qualified)
7. (United States) Megan McCray (qualifying competition)

=== Qualifiers ===
1. (South Korea) Han Na-lae
2. (United States) Claire Liu
3. (Canada) Katherine Sebov
4. (Japan) Haruka Kaji

=== Qualifying draw ===
==== First qualifier ====
Qualifying competition
1	(South Korea) Han Na-lae	6	6
WC	(Germany) Lena Lutzeier	0	4

==== Second qualifier ====
Qualifying competition
2	(United States) Claire Liu	6	6
7/WC	(United States) Megan McCray	0	3

==== Third qualifier ====
Qualifying competition
3	(Canada) Katherine Sebov	7	6
5	(Serbia) Jovana Jakšić	5	1

==== Fourth qualifier ====
Qualifying competition
4	(Japan) Mari Osaka	3	5
6	(Japan) Haruka Kaji	6	7
