= 2016 Open de Limoges =

- Date: 14–20 November 2016
- Edition: 10th
- Category: WTA 125K series
- Prize money: $115,000
- Surface: Hard (indoor)
- Location: Limoges, France

Champions

Singles
- (Russia) Ekaterina Alexandrova

Doubles
- (Belgium) Elise Mertens / (Luxembourg) Mandy Minella
- Open de Limoges

The 2016 Open de Limoges was a professional tennis tournament played on indoor hard courts. It was the 10th edition of the tournament and part of the 2016 WTA 125K series, offering a total of $115,000 in prize money. It took place in Limoges, France, on 14–20 November 2016.

== Singles main draw entrants ==
=== Seeds ===
Country	Player	Rank^{1}	Seed
FRA	Caroline Garcia	23	1
FRA	Alizé Cornet	46	2
FRA	Océane Dodin	71	3
FRA	Pauline Parmentier	73	4
ROU	Sorana Cîrstea	81	5
CRO	Donna Vekić	101	6
LUX	Mandy Minella	103	7
SUI	Stefanie Vögele	113	8

- ^{1} Rankings as of 7 November 2016.

=== Other entrants ===
The following player received a wildcard into the singles main draw:

- (France) Alizé Cornet
- (France) Fiona Ferro
- (France) Caroline Garcia
- (France) Amandine Hesse
- (United States) Alexandra Stevenson
- (Ukraine) Dayana Yastremska

The following players received entry from the qualifying draw:

- (Uzbekistan) Akgul Amanmuradova
- (Romania) Alexandra Cadanțu
- (Russia) Valentyna Ivakhnenko
- (Kazakhstan) Galina Voskoboeva

The following player received entry as a lucky loser:

- (North Macedonia) Lina Gjorcheska

== Doubles entrants ==
=== Seeds ===
Country	Player	Country	Player	Rank^{1}	Seed
UKR	Lyudmyla Kichenok	UKR	Nadiia Kichenok	135	1
GBR	Anna Smith	CZE	Renata Voráčová	149	2
GER	Nicola Geuer	USA	Nicole Melichar	207	3
CZE	Lenka Kunčíková	CZE	Karolína Stuchlá	210	4

- ^{1} Rankings as of 7 November 2016.

=== Other entrants ===
The following pair received a wildcard into the doubles main draw:

- (France) Amandine Hesse / (United Kingdom) Tara Moore

== Champions ==
=== Singles ===
- (Russia) Ekaterina Alexandrova def. (France) Caroline Garcia, 6–4, 6–0

=== Doubles ===
- (Belgium) Elise Mertens / (Luxembourg) Mandy Minella def. (United Kingdom) Anna Smith / (Czech Republic) Renata Voráčová, 6–4, 6–4
