= San Antonio Open =

Defunct tennis tournament
- Event name: San Antonio Open
- Tour: WTA 125K series
- Founded: 2016
- Abolished: 2016
- Location: San Antonio, United States
- Venue: McFarlin Tennis Center
- Surface: Hard / outdoor
- Prize money: $125,000

The San Antonio Open was a tournament for professional female tennis players played on outdoor hard courts. The event was a part of the 2016 WTA 125K series and was held in San Antonio, United States.

== Past finals ==
=== Singles ===
Year	Champion	Runner-up	Score
2016	(Japan) Misaki Doi	(Germany) Anna-Lena Friedsam	6–4, 6–2

=== Doubles ===
Year	Champions	Runners-up	Score
2016	(Germany) Anna-Lena Grönefeld (United States) Nicole Melichar	(Poland) Klaudia Jans-Ignacik (Australia) Anastasia Rodionova	6–1, 6–3
