= 2016 San Antonio Open – Singles =

Singles
- 2016 San Antonio Open

Final
- Champion: (Japan) Misaki Doi
- Runner-up: (Germany) Anna-Lena Friedsam
- Score: 6–4, 6–2

Events
Singles	Doubles
← 2015 ·	San Antonio Open	· 2017 →

This was the first edition of the tournament. Misaki Doi won the title, defeating Anna-Lena Friedsam in the final, 6–4, 6–2.

== Seeds ==
1. (Australia) Daria Gavrilova (quarterfinals)
2. (Romania) Irina-Camelia Begu (first round)
3. (Latvia) Jeļena Ostapenko (first round)
4. (Belgium) Yanina Wickmayer (first round)
5. (Brazil) Teliana Pereira (first round)
6. (Japan) Misaki Doi (champion)
7. (Belgium) Kirsten Flipkens (second round)
8. (Japan) Nao Hibino (first round)

== Draw ==
Key

- Q = Qualifier
- WC = Wild card
- LL = Lucky loser
- Alt = Alternate
- ITF = ITF entry
- PR = Protected ranking
- SR = Special ranking
- SE = Special exempt
- JE = Junior exempt
- JR = Junior Accelerator Programme entrant
- CO = College Accelerator Programme entrant
- NG = Next Gen Accelerator Program entrant
- w/o = Walkover
- r = Retired
- d = Defaulted

=== Finals ===
Semifinals
(United States) Alison Riske	3	6^{4}
(Germany) Anna-Lena Friedsam	6	7^{7}
(Bulgaria) Tsvetana Pironkova	4	6	4
6	(Japan) Misaki Doi	6	2	6

Final
(Germany) Anna-Lena Friedsam	4	2
6	(Japan) Misaki Doi	6	6

=== Top half ===
First round
1/WC	(Australia) D Gavrilova	7^{10}	6
(Belarus) O Govortsova	6^{8}	1
(Austria) T Paszek	6^{5}	6	1
WC	(Greece) M Sakkari	7^{7}	3	6
(Germany) L Siegemund	5	6	4
(United States) A Riske	7	4	6
(Colombia) M Duque Mariño	3	6^{4}
7	(Belgium) K Flipkens	6	7^{7}
3	(Latvia) J Ostapenko	5	4
(Croatia) A Konjuh	7	6
(United States) A Tatishvili	4	4
(Poland) M Linette	6	6
(Germany) A-L Friedsam	6	6
(United Kingdom) N Broady	2	3
WC	(United States) C Bellis	6	6
8	(Japan) N Hibino	3	2

Second round
1/WC	(Australia) D Gavrilova	4	7^{7}	6
WC	(Greece) M Sakkari	6	6^{5}	3
(United States) A Riske	7	6
7	(Belgium) K Flipkens	5	1
(Croatia) A Konjuh	6	7^{7}
(Poland) M Linette	0	6^{0}
(Germany) A-L Friedsam	1	7^{7}	6
WC	(United States) C Bellis	6	6^{1}	3

Quarterfinals
1/WC	(Australia) D Gavrilova	4	4
(United States) A Riske	6	6
(Croatia) A Konjuh	4	6	2
(Germany) A-L Friedsam	6	4	6

Semifinals
(United States) A Riske	3	6^{4}
(Germany) A-L Friedsam	6	7^{7}

=== Bottom half ===
First round
5/WC	(Brazil) T Pereira	3	3
(Netherlands) K Bertens	6	6
(Croatia) D Vekić	6	6
(Belarus) A Sasnovich	4	4
WC	(Australia) C Dellacqua	1	0
(Bulgaria) T Pironkova	6	6
(United States) L Davis	2	6	6
4	(Belgium) Y Wickmayer	6	1	3
6	(Japan) M Doi	6	6
(Russia) E Rodina	3	3
(China) X Han	6	1	6
(United States) I Falconi	4	6	3
(Germany) C Witthöft	3	6	6
(Slovakia) J Čepelová	6	4	2
(United States) S Crawford	2	6	7
2/WC	(Romania) I-C Begu	6	1	5

Second round
(Netherlands) K Bertens	6^{3}	3
(Croatia) D Vekić	7^{7}	6
(Bulgaria) T Pironkova	6	6
(United States) L Davis	3	2
6	(Japan) M Doi	7^{7}	7^{7}
(China) X Han	6^{5}	6^{4}
(Germany) C Witthöft	1	3
(United States) S Crawford	6	6

Quarterfinals
(Croatia) D Vekić	2	1
(Bulgaria) T Pironkova	6	6
6	(Japan) M Doi	6	6
(United States) S Crawford	3	3

Semifinals
(Bulgaria) T Pironkova	4	6	4
6	(Japan) M Doi	6	2	6
