= 2016 Hawaii Tennis Open – Doubles =

Doubles
- 2016 Hawaii Tennis Open

Final
- Champions: (Japan) Eri Hozumi (Japan) Miyu Kato
- Runners-up: (United States) Nicole Gibbs (United States) Asia Muhammad
- Score: 6–7^{(3–7)}, 6–3, [10–8]

Events
Singles	Doubles
Hawaii Tennis Open	· 2017 →

This was the first edition of the tournament.

Top seeds Eri Hozumi and Miyu Kato won the title, defeating Nicole Gibbs and Asia Muhammad in the final, 6–7^{(3–7)}, 6–3, [10–8].

== Seeds ==
1. (Japan) Eri Hozumi / (Japan) Miyu Kato (champions)
2. (Paraguay) Verónica Cepede Royg / (United States) Nicole Melichar (first round)
3. (United States) Nicole Gibbs / (United States) Asia Muhammad (final)
4. (Japan) Hiroko Kuwata / (United States) Jamie Loeb (first round)

== Draw ==
=== Key ===
- Q = Qualifier
- WC = Wild card
- LL = Lucky loser
- Alt = Alternate
- SE = Special exempt
- PR = Protected ranking
- ITF = ITF entry
- JE = Junior exempt
- w/o = Walkover
- r = Retired
- d = Defaulted
- SR = Special ranking

First round
1	(Japan) E Hozumi (Japan) M Kato	6	6
WC	(China) X Wen (China) N Zhang	0	2
4	(Japan) H Kuwata (United States) J Loeb	5	7^{7}	[1]
(United States) J Cako (Japan) A Omae	7	6^{3}	[10]
(United States) I Neel (Hungary) F Stollár	2	5
3	(United States) N Gibbs (United States) A Muhammad	6	7
(Belarus) O Govortsova (Russia) E Rodina	6	4	[10]
2	(Paraguay) V Cepede Royg (United States) N Melichar	3	6	[7]

Semifinals
1	(Japan) E Hozumi (Japan) M Kato	6	6
(United States) J Cako (Japan) A Omae	3	3
3	(United States) N Gibbs (United States) A Muhammad	6	6
(Belarus) O Govortsova (Russia) E Rodina	3	2

Final
1	(Japan) E Hozumi (Japan) M Kato	6^{3}	6	[10]
3	(United States) N Gibbs (United States) A Muhammad	7^{7}	3	[8]
