= 2016 Hawaii Tennis Open – Singles =

Singles
- 2016 Hawaii Tennis Open

Final
- Champion: (United States) Catherine Bellis
- Runner-up: (China) Zhang Shuai
- Score: 6–4, 6–2

Events
Singles	Doubles
- Hawaii Tennis Open

This was the first edition of the tournament.

Catherine Bellis won the title, defeating Zhang Shuai in the final 6–4, 6–2.

== Seeds ==
1. (China) Zhang Shuai (final)
2. (United States) Nicole Gibbs (first round)
3. (Greece) Maria Sakkari (first round)
4. (United States) Catherine Bellis (champion)
5. (Germany) Sabine Lisicki (quarterfinals, retired)
6. (Russia) Evgeniya Rodina (semifinals)
7. (Spain) Sara Sorribes Tormo (quarterfinals)
8. (United States) Samantha Crawford (quarterfinals)

== Main draw ==
Key

- Q = Qualifier
- WC = Wild card
- LL = Lucky loser
- Alt = Alternate
- ITF = ITF entry
- PR = Protected ranking
- SR = Special ranking
- SE = Special exempt
- JE = Junior exempt
- JR = Junior Accelerator Programme entrant
- CO = College Accelerator Programme entrant
- NG = Next Gen Accelerator Program entrant
- w/o = Walkover
- r = Retired
- d = Defaulted

=== Finals ===
Semifinals
1/WC	(China) Zhang Shuai	6	6
6	(Russia) Evgeniya Rodina	2	3
4	(United States) Catherine Bellis	6	6
(United States) Jacqueline Cako	0	4

Final
1/WC	(China) Zhang Shuai	4	2
4	(United States) Catherine Bellis	6	6

=== Top half ===
First round
1/WC	(China) S Zhang	6	6
(Japan) A Omae	3	2
(United States) D Lao	3	4
(New Zealand) M Erakovic	6	6
(United States) D Collins	6	3
(Germany) T Maria	2	0^{r}
(Japan) E Sema	3	4
8	(United States) S Crawford	6	6
3	(Greece) M Sakkari	5	2
(United States) S Vickery	7	6
(Japan) E Hozumi	6	6
(Belarus) O Govortsova	2	3
WC	(Hungary) F Stollár	4	6	1
WC	(United Kingdom) K Swan	6	1	6
Q	(United States) M Gordon	2	1
6	(Russia) E Rodina	6	6

Second round
1/WC	(China) S Zhang	7	6
(New Zealand) M Erakovic	5	3
(United States) D Collins	1	5
8	(United States) S Crawford	6	7
(United States) S Vickery	6	6
(Japan) E Hozumi	4	1
WC	(United Kingdom) K Swan	2	3
6	(Russia) E Rodina	6	6

Quarterfinals
1/WC	(China) S Zhang	6	6
8	(United States) S Crawford	4	4
(United States) S Vickery	3	6	4
6	(Russia) E Rodina	6	3	6

Semifinals
1/WC	(China) S Zhang	6	6
6	(Russia) E Rodina	2	3

=== Bottom half ===
First round
7	(Spain) S Sorribes Tormo	6	6
(Croatia) T Mrdeža	3	4
(United States) A Muhammad	6	6
(Japan) H Kuwata	3	1
(Japan) M Kato	3	5
WC	(United States) UM Arconada	6	7
Q	(China) N Zhang	2	3
4	(United States) C Bellis	6	6
5	(Germany) S Lisicki	6	6
(United States) J Boserup	4	4
(United States) G Min	3	4
(Paraguay) V Cepede Royg	6	6
(United States) J Loeb	6	6
WC	(United States) I Neel	2	4
(United States) J Cako	6	7
2	(United States) N Gibbs	3	5

Second round
7	(Spain) S Sorribes Tormo	6	4	6
(United States) A Muhammad	3	6	1
WC	(United States) UM Arconada	1	2
4	(United States) C Bellis	6	6
5	(Germany) S Lisicki	7^{7}	6
(Paraguay) V Cepede Royg	6^{2}	1
(United States) J Loeb	6	1	5
(United States) J Cako	3	6	7

Quarterfinals
7	(Spain) S Sorribes Tormo	1	1
4	(United States) C Bellis	6	6
5	(Germany) S Lisicki	6	5	0^{r}
(United States) J Cako	3	7	2

Semifinals
4	(United States) C Bellis	6	6
(United States) J Cako	0	4
