= 2016 Open de Limoges – Singles =

Singles
- 2016 Open de Limoges

Final
- Champion: (Russia) Ekaterina Alexandrova
- Runner-up: (France) Caroline Garcia
- Score: 6–4, 6–0

Events
Singles	Doubles
← 2015 ·	Open de Limoges	· 2017 →

Caroline Garcia was the defending champion, but was defeated in the final by Ekaterina Alexandrova, 6–4, 6–0.

== Seeds ==
1. (France) Caroline Garcia (final)
2. (France) Alizé Cornet (semifinals)
3. (France) Océane Dodin (second round)
4. (France) Pauline Parmentier (second round)
5. (Romania) Sorana Cîrstea (second round)
6. (Croatia) Donna Vekić (quarterfinals)
7. (Luxembourg) Mandy Minella (second round)
8. (Switzerland) Stefanie Vögele (quarterfinals)

== Main draw ==
=== Key ===
- Q = Qualifier
- WC = Wild card
- LL = Lucky loser
- Alt = Alternate
- SE = Special exempt
- PR = Protected ranking
- ITF = ITF entry
- JE = Junior exempt
- w/o = Walkover
- r = Retired
- d = Defaulted
- SR = Special ranking

=== Finals ===
Semifinals
1/WC	(France) Caroline Garcia	7^{7}	3	7^{8}
(Russia) Natalia Vikhlyantseva	6^{3}	6	6^{6}
(Russia) Ekaterina Alexandrova	3	6	6
2	(France) Alizé Cornet	6	2	0

Final
1/WC	(France) Caroline Garcia	4	0
(Russia) Ekaterina Alexandrova	6	6

=== Top half ===
First round
1/WC	(France) C Garcia	6	7
(Slovakia) R Šramková	2	5
(Czech Republic) L Hradecká	6	4	6
(Bulgaria) I Shinikova	3	6	0
(United Kingdom) T Moore	7	6
(Belgium) E Mertens	5	4
(Bulgaria) E Kostova	0	2
6	(Croatia) D Vekić	6	6
3	(France) O Dodin	2	6	6
Q	(Romania) A Cadanțu	6	4	2
WC	(United States) A Stevenson	6	5	4
(Russia) N Vikhlyantseva	2	7	6
(Spain) S Soler Espinosa	4	3
(Germany) T Korpatsch	6	6
(Switzerland) A Sadiković	1	2
5	(Romania) S Cîrstea	6	6

Second round
1/WC	(France) C Garcia	6	6
(Czech Republic) L Hradecká	3	4
(United Kingdom) T Moore	6^{6}	6	5
6	(Croatia) D Vekić	7^{8}	2	7
3	(France) O Dodin	5	3
(Russia) N Vikhlyantseva	7	6
(Germany) T Korpatsch	6^{5}	6	6
5	(Romania) S Cîrstea	7^{7}	4	1

Quarterfinals
1/WC	(France) C Garcia	6	4	6
6	(Croatia) D Vekić	1	6	3
(Russia) N Vikhlyantseva	6	6
(Germany) T Korpatsch	4	1

Semifinals
1/WC	(France) C Garcia	7^{7}	3	7^{8}
(Russia) N Vikhlyantseva	6^{3}	6	6^{8}

=== Bottom half ===
First round
7	(Luxembourg) M Minella	6	7
WC	(Ukraine) D Yastremska	4	5
LL	(North Macedonia) L Gjorcheska	1	3
(Belgium) M Zanevska	6	6
(Russia) E Alexandrova	6	7
Q	(Kazakhstan) G Voskoboeva	1	5
(Netherlands) C Burger	0	2
4	(France) P Parmentier	6	6
8	(Switzerland) S Vögele	6	6
(Germany) M Barthel	3	4
WC	(France) A Hesse	6	6
Q	(Russia) V Ivakhnenko	3	3
WC	(France) F Ferro	5	4
(Serbia) I Jorović	7	6
Q	(Uzbekistan) A Amanmuradova	2	7^{7}	6^{3}
2/WC	(France) A Cornet	6	6^{5}	7^{7}

Second round
7	(Luxembourg) M Minella	2	5
(Belgium) M Zanevska	6	7
(Russia) E Alexandrova	7^{8}	6
4	(France) P Parmentier	6^{6}	4
8	(Switzerland) S Vögele	6	6
WC	(France) A Hesse	2	3
(Serbia) I Jorović	1	3
2/WC	(France) A Cornet	6	6

Quarterfinals
(Belgium) M Zanevska	6^{5}	5
(Russia) E Alexandrova	7^{7}	7
8	(Switzerland) S Vögele	4	6^{6}
2/WC	(France) A Cornet	6	7^{8}

Semifinals
(Russia) E Alexandrova	3	6	6
2	(France) A Cornet	6	2	0
