= 2017 Hawaii Tennis Open – Doubles =

Tennis tournament – women's doubles

Doubles
- 2017 Hawaii Tennis Open

Final
- Champions: (Chinese Taipei) Hsieh Shu-ying (Chinese Taipei) Hsieh Su-wei
- Runners-up: (Japan) Eri Hozumi (United States) Asia Muhammad
- Score: 6–1, 7–6^{(7–3)}

Events
Singles	Doubles
- Hawaii Tennis Open

Eri Hozumi and Miyu Kato were the defending champions, but Kato chose not to participate this year. Hozumi played alongside Asia Muhammad, but lost in the final to sisters Hsieh Shu-ying and Hsieh Su-wei, 1–6, 6–7^{(3–7)}.

== Seeds ==
The top two seeds received a bye into the quarterfinals.

1. (China) Han Xinyun / (Japan) Makoto Ninomiya (quarterfinals)
2. (Japan) Eri Hozumi / (United States) Asia Muhammad (final)
3. (Netherlands) Lesley Kerkhove / (Belarus) Lidziya Marozava (semifinals)
4. (United States) Usue Maitane Arconada / (United States) Kaitlyn Christian (quarterfinals)

== Draw ==
Key

- Q = Qualifier
- WC = Wild card
- LL = Lucky loser
- Alt = Alternate
- ITF = ITF entry
- PR = Protected ranking
- SR = Special ranking
- SE = Special exempt
- JE = Junior exempt
- JR = Junior Accelerator Programme entrant
- CO = College Accelerator Programme entrant
- NG = Next Gen Accelerator Program entrant
- w/o = Walkover
- r = Retired
- d = Defaulted

=== Draw ===
First round
(Chinese Taipei) S-y Hsieh (Chinese Taipei) S-w Hsieh	6	6^{5}	[10]
(United States) J Cako (Czech Republic) E Hrdinová	4	7^{7}	[4]
3	(Netherlands) L Kerkhove (Belarus) L Marozava	3	6	[10]
(Germany) V Heisen (United States) M McCray	6	3	[4]
(Russia) A Pivovarova (Russia) E Rodina	6	6
(Serbia) J Jakšić (Japan) A Okuno	1	1
(United States) J Boserup (Sweden) R Peterson	6	2	[5]
(South Korea) N-l Han (South Korea) S-j Jang	3	6	[10]
(Australia) N Hoynaski (Italy) L Meccico	3	0
4	(United States) UM Arconada (United States) K Christian	6	6
(United States) M Gordon (United States) C Liu	6	6
(China) X Wen (China) N Zhang	4	2

Quarterfinals
1	(China) X Han (Japan) M Ninomiya	0	4
(Chinese Taipei) S-y Hsieh (Chinese Taipei) S-w Hsieh	6	6
3	(Netherlands) L Kerkhove (Belarus) L Marozava	6	3	[10]
(Russia) A Pivovarova (Russia) E Rodina	2	6	[7]
(South Korea) N-l Han (South Korea) S-j Jang	6	6
4	(United States) UM Arconada (United States) K Christian	4	3
(United States) M Gordon (United States) C Liu	4	6	[7]
2	(Japan) E Hozumi (United States) A Muhammad	6	0	[10]

Semifinals
(Chinese Taipei) S-y Hsieh (Chinese Taipei) S-w Hsieh	0	7^{7}	[11]
3	(Netherlands) L Kerkhove (Belarus) L Marozava	6	6^{5}	[9]
(South Korea) N-l Han (South Korea) S-j Jang	2	4
2	(Japan) E Hozumi (United States) A Muhammad	6	6

Final
(Chinese Taipei) S-y Hsieh (Chinese Taipei) S-w Hsieh	6	7^{7}
2	(Japan) E Hozumi (United States) A Muhammad	1	6^{3}
