= 2016 San Antonio Open – Doubles =

Doubles
- 2016 San Antonio Open

Final
- Champion: (Germany) Anna-Lena Grönefeld (United States) Nicole Melichar
- Runner-up: (Poland) Klaudia Jans-Ignacik (Australia) Anastasia Rodionova
- Score: 6–1, 6–3

Events
Singles	Doubles
← 2015 ·	San Antonio Open	· 2017 →

This was the first edition of the tournament.

Anna-Lena Grönefeld and Nicole Melichar won the title after defeating Klaudia Jans-Ignacik and Anastasia Rodionova 6–1, 6–3 in the final.

== Seeds ==
1. (Australia) Casey Dellacqua / (Croatia) Darija Jurak (semifinals)
2. (Chinese Taipei) Chuang Chia-jung / (China) Liang Chen (semifinals)
3. (Poland) Klaudia Jans-Ignacik / (Australia) Anastasia Rodionova (final)
4. (Germany) Anna-Lena Grönefeld / (United States) Nicole Melichar (champions)

== Draw ==
=== Key ===
- Q = Qualifier
- WC = Wild card
- LL = Lucky loser
- Alt = Alternate
- SE = Special exempt
- PR = Protected ranking
- ITF = ITF entry
- JE = Junior exempt
- w/o = Walkover
- r = Retired
- d = Defaulted
- SR = Special ranking

Quarterfinals
1	(Australia) C Dellacqua (Croatia) D Jurak	7^{7}	6
WC	(United States) A Weinhold (United States) C Whoriskey	6^{1}	1
3	(Poland) K Jans-Ignacik (Australia) An Rodionova	7	1	[11]
(United Kingdom) N Broady (Poland) A Rosolska	5	6	[9]
(Switzerland) V Golubic (China) X Han	7	6^{8}	[8]
4	(Germany) A-L Grönefeld (United States) N Melichar	5	7^{10}	[10]
(Romania) R Olaru (Russia) E Rodina	5	3
2	(Chinese Taipei) C-j Chuang (China) C Liang	7	6

Semifinals
1	(Australia) C Dellacqua (Croatia) D Jurak	4	5
3	(Poland) K Jans-Ignacik (Australia) An Rodionova	6	7
4	(Germany) A-L Grönefeld (United States) N Melichar	3	6	[10]
2	(Chinese Taipei) C-j Chuang (China) C Liang	6	1	[6]

Final
3	(Poland) K Jans-Ignacik (Australia) An Rodionova	1	3
4	(Germany) A-L Grönefeld (United States) N Melichar	6	6
