= WTA 125 tournaments =

Tournament category in women's tennis 2009–present

WTA 125 tournaments are an international series of professional women's tennis tournaments organized by the Women's Tennis Association since 2012. They are currently part of the WTA Challenger Tour and are also known as the WTA Challengers (analogous to the trademarked men's ATP Challenger Tour). The WTA 125 is the second highest level of women's competition, below the top-tier WTA Tour, and above the Women's World Tennis Tour tournaments.

Players who succeed in the WTA 125 tournaments earn sufficient overall WTA ranking points to become eligible for the main draw or qualifying draw entry of WTA Tour tournaments. Results such as titles won at a WTA 125 event are separately counted from the same player's achievements at WTA Tour level tournaments. However match results from WTA 125 events are counted and added into WTA players' overall head-to-head win/loss statistics.

== Tournaments ==
=== Africa ===
==== Angola ====
| Tournament | City | Prize money | Year(s) | Surface |
|---|---|---|---|---|
| Angola Ladies Open | Luanda | $115,000 | 2026–present | Hard |

=== Asia ===
==== China ====
| Tournament | City | Prize money | Year(s) | Surface |
|---|---|---|---|---|
| Kunming Open | Anning | $115,000 | 2018–19 | Clay |
| Changsha Open | Changsha | $115,000 | 2025 | Clay |
| Dalian Tennis Open | Dalian | $115,000 | 2015–17 | Hard |
| Huzhou Open | Huzhou | $115,000 | 2025–present | Clay |
| Jinan Open | Jinan | $115,000 | 2025 | Hard |
| Jingshan Tennis Open | Jingshan | $115,000 | 2025–present | Hard |
| Jiangxi Open | Nanchang/Jiujiang | $115,000 | 2014–2015, 2026–present | Hard |
| Nanjing Ladies Open | Nanjing | $115,000 | 2013 | Hard |
| Ningbo International Tennis Open | Ningbo | $115,000 | 2013–2014 | Hard |
| Suzhou Open | Suzhou | $115,000 | 2013–2014; 2025–present | Hard |
| Zhengzhou Women's Tennis Open | Zhengzhou | $115,000 | 2017–2018 | Hard |

==== Hong Kong ====
| Tournament | City | Prize money | Year(s) | Surface |
|---|---|---|---|---|
| Hong Kong 125 Open | Hong Kong | $115,000 | 2024 | Hard |

==== India ====
| Tournament | City | Prize money | Year(s) | Surface |
|---|---|---|---|---|
| Royal Indian Open | Pune | $115,000 | 2012 | Hard |
| L&T Mumbai Open | Mumbai | $115,000 | 2017–2018; 2024–present | Hard |

==== Philippines ====
| Tournament | City | Prize money | Year(s) | Surface |
|---|---|---|---|---|
| Philippine Women's Open | Manila | $115,000 | 2026–present | Hard |

==== South Korea ====
| Tournament | City | Prize money | Year(s) | Surface |
|---|---|---|---|---|
| Hana Bank Korea Open | Seoul | $115,000 | 2021 | Hard (i) |

==== Taiwan ====
| Tournament | City | Prize money | Year(s) | Surface |
|---|---|---|---|---|
| OEC Taipei WTA Challenger | Taipei | $115,000 | 2012–2019 | Carpet (i) |

==== Thailand ====
| Tournament | City | Prize money | Year(s) | Surface |
|---|---|---|---|---|
| Hua Hin Championships | Hua Hin | $115,000 | 2015, 2017 | Hard |

=== Europe ===
==== Andorra ====
| Tournament | City | Prize money | Year(s) | Surface |
|---|---|---|---|---|
| Creand Andorrà Open | Andorra la Vella | $115,000 | 2022–2023 | Hard (i) |

==== Austria ====
| Tournament | City | Prize money | Year(s) | Surface |
|---|---|---|---|---|
| Generali Open Ladies Kitzbühel | Kitzbühel | $115,000 | 2026–present | Clay |

==== Croatia ====
| Tournament | City | Prize money | Year(s) | Surface |
|---|---|---|---|---|
| Croatia Bol Open | Bol | $115,000 | 2016–2019; 2021 | Clay |
| Dubrovnik Open | Dubrovnik | $115,000 | 2026–present | Clay |
| Makarska Open | Makarska | $115,000 | 2022–present | Clay |

==== Czech Republic ====
| Tournament | City | Prize money | Year(s) | Surface |
|---|---|---|---|---|
| TK Sparta Prague Open | Prague | $3,125,000 (Note: Held once during COVID as TK Sparta Prague Open) | 2020 | Clay |

==== France ====
| Tournament | City | Prize money | Year(s) | Surface |
|---|---|---|---|---|
| Open Angers Loire Trélazé | Angers | $115,000 | 2021–present | Hard (i) |
| Grand Est Open 88 | Contrexéville | $115,000 | 2022–present | Clay |
| Open Arena Les Sables d'Olonne | Les Sables d'Olonne | $115,000 | 2026–present | Hard (i) |
| Open BLS de Limoges | Limoges | $115,000 | 2014–2019; 2021–present | Hard (i) |
| Trophée Clarins | Paris | $115,000 | 2022–present | Clay |
| Open de Rouen Capfinances | Rouen | $115,000 | 2022–2023 | Hard (i) |
| L'Open 35 de Saint-Malo | Saint-Malo | $115,000 | 2021–present | Clay |

==== Germany ====
| Tournament | City | Prize money | Year(s) | Surface |
|---|---|---|---|---|
| Liqui Moly Open | Karlsruhe | $115,000 | 2019; 2021–2022 | Clay |
| ECE Ladies Hamburg Open | Hamburg | $115,000 | 2024 | Clay |

==== Hungary ====
| Tournament | City | Prize money | Year(s) | Surface |
|---|---|---|---|---|
| Hungarian Ladies Open | Budapest | $115,000 | 2022 | Clay |

==== Italy ====
| Tournament | City | Prize money | Year(s) | Surface |
|---|---|---|---|---|
| Open Delle Puglie | Bari/Foggia | $115,000 | 2022–present | Clay |
| Internazionali Femminili di Brescia | Brescia | $115,000 | 2026–present | Clay |
| Valle D'Aosta Ladies Open | Courmayeur | $115,000 | 2026–present | Hard (i) |
| Veneto Open promoted by Regione del Veneto | Gaiba | $115,000 | 2022–2024 | Grass |
| Città di Grado Tennis Cup | Grado | $115,000 | 2025 | Clay |
| Firenze Ladies Open | Florence | $115,000 | 2023 | Clay |
| Memorial Eugenio Fontana | Modena | $115,000 | 2026–present | Clay |
| Palermo Ladies Open | Palermo | $115,000 | 2025–present | Clay |
| Parma Ladies Open | Parma | $115,000 | 2023–present | Clay |
| Internazionali di Calabria | Rende | $115,000 | 2025 | Clay |
| ATV Bancomat Tennis Open | Rome | $115,000 | 2025–present | Clay |
| RoveretOpen Città Della Pace | Rovereto | $115,000 | 2025–present | Hard (i) |
| Delta Motors Tolentino Open | Tolentino | $115,000 | 2025–present | Clay |

==== Poland ====
| Tournament | City | Prize money | Year(s) | Surface |
|---|---|---|---|---|
| T-Mobile Polish Open | Grodzisk Mazowiecki/Warsaw | $115,000 | 2023–present | Hard |

==== Portugal ====
| Tournament | City | Prize money | Year(s) | Surface |
|---|---|---|---|---|
| Caldas da Rainha Ladies Open | Caldas da Rainha | $115,000 | 2025–present | Hard |
| Figueira da Foz Ladies Open | Figueira da Foz | $115,000 | 2026–present | Hard |
| Lisboa Belém Open | Lisbon | $115,000 | 2026–present | Clay |
| Oeiras Jamor Indoor | Oeiras | $115,000 | 2026–present | Hard (i) |
| Oeiras Jamor Ladies Open | Oeiras | $225,000 | 2024–present | Clay |
| Oeiras Open CETO | Oeiras | $115,000 | 2026–present | Clay |
| Eupago Porto Open | Porto | $115,000 | 2025–present | Hard |

==== Romania ====
| Tournament | City | Prize money | Year(s) | Surface |
|---|---|---|---|---|
| Țiriac Foundation Trophy | Bucharest | $115,000 | 2022–2024 | Clay |
| BCR Iași Open | Iași | $115,000 | 2022–2023 | Clay |
| AXERIA Open | Târgu Mureș | $115,000 | 2026–present | Clay |

==== Serbia ====
| Tournament | City | Prize money | Year(s) | Surface |
|---|---|---|---|---|
| Belgrade Ladies Open | Belgrade | $115,000 | 2021 | Clay |

==== Slovenia ====
| Tournament | City | Prize money | Year(s) | Surface |
|---|---|---|---|---|
| Zavarovalnica Triglav Ljubljana | Ljubljana | $115,000 | 2023–Present | Clay |

==== Spain ====
| Tournament | City | Prize money | Year(s) | Surface |
|---|---|---|---|---|
| Open Internacional de Tennis Femení Solgironès | La Bisbal d'Empordà | $115,000 | 2023–2025 | Clay |
| Grand Prix Open Villa de Madrid | Madrid | $115,000 | 2026–present | Clay |
| Vanda Pharmaceuticals Mallorca Women's Championships | Mallorca | $115,000 | 2025–present | Clay |
| AnyTech365 Andalucía Open | Marbella | $115,000 | 2022 | Clay |
| Catalonia Open Solgironès | Reus/Lleida/Vic/La Bisbal d'Empordà/Sabadell | $115,000 | 2023–present | Clay |
| Open Internacional de San Sebastián | San Sebastián | $115,000 | 2025 | Clay |
| BBVA Open Internacional de Valencia | Valencia | $115,000 | 2022–present | Clay |

==== Sweden ====
| Tournament | City | Prize money | Year(s) | Surface |
|---|---|---|---|---|
| Nordea Open | Båstad | $115,000 | 2019; 2021–present | Clay |

==== Switzerland ====
| Tournament | City | Prize money | Year(s) | Surface |
|---|---|---|---|---|
| Montreux Nestlé Open | Montreux | $115,000 | 2024–present | Clay |

==== United Kingdom ====
| Tournament | City | Prize money | Year(s) | Surface |
|---|---|---|---|---|
| Birmingham Open | Birmingham | $225,000 | 2025–present | Grass |
| Ilkley Open | Ilkley | $225,000 | 2025–present | Grass |

==== Turkey ====
| Tournament | City | Prize money | Year(s) | Surface |
|---|---|---|---|---|
| Adana Open | Adana | $115,000 | 2026–present | Hard |
| Turk Telekom Ankara Open | Ankara | $115,000 | 2026–present | Hard |
| Antalya Open | Antalya | $115,000 | 2024–present | Clay |
| İstanbul Open | Istanbul | $115,000 | 2026–present | Clay |
| ENKA Open | Istanbul | $115,000 | 2026–present | Hard |
| Samsun Open | Samsun | $115,000 | 2025–present | Hard |

=== North America ===
==== Canada ====
| Tournament | City | Prize money | Year(s) | Surface |
|---|---|---|---|---|
| Odlum Brown Van Open | Vancouver | $225,000 | 2022; 2026–present | Hard |

==== Mexico ====
| Tournament | City | Prize money | Year(s) | Surface |
|---|---|---|---|---|
| Cancún Tennis Open | Cancún | $115,000 | 2025 | Hard |
| Guadalajara 125 Open | Guadalajara | $115,000 | 2019; 2024–2025 | Hard |
| Puerto Vallarta Open | Puerto Vallarta | $115,000 | 2024–2025 | Hard |
| Querétaro Open | Querétaro | $115,000 | 2025–present | Clay |
| San Luis Open | San Luis Potosí | $115,000 | 2023–2024 | Clay |
| Abierto Tampico | Tampico | $115,000 | 2022–2025 | Hard |

==== United States ====
| Tournament | City | Prize money | Year(s) | Surface |
|---|---|---|---|---|
| Austin 125 | Austin | $115,000 | 2025–present | Hard |
| Carlsbad Classic | Carlsbad | $115,000 | 2015 | Hard |
| Fifth Third Charleston 125 | Charleston | $115,000 | 2021, 2024 | Clay (green) |
| Chicago Women's Open | Chicago | $115,000 | 2018, 2021, 2023 | Hard |
| Columbus WTA 125 | Columbus | $115,000 | 2021 | Hard (i) |
| Thoreau Tennis Open 125 | Concord | $115,000 | 2021–2022 | Hard |
| Hawaii Tennis Open | Honolulu | $115,000 | 2016–2017 | Hard |
| Oracle Challenger Series – Houston | Houston | $162,480 | 2018–2019 | Hard |
| Oracle Challenger Series – Indian Wells | Indian Wells | $162,480 | 2018–2020 | Hard |
| Dow Tennis Classic | Midland | $115,000 | 2021–2024; 2026 | Hard (i) |
| Oracle Challenger Series – New Haven | New Haven | $162,480 | 2019 | Hard |
| Hall of Fame Open | Newport | $225,000 | 2025–present | Grass |
| Oracle Challenger Series – Newport Beach | Newport Beach | $162,480 | 2018–2020 | Hard |
| Ennoble Care Philly Open | Philadelphia | $115,000 | 2026–present | Hard |
| San Antonio Open | San Antonio | $115,000 | 2016 | Hard |
| Golden Gate Open | Stanford | $115,000 | 2023 | Hard |

=== Oceania ===
==== Australia ====
| Tournament | City | Prize money | Year(s) | Surface |
|---|---|---|---|---|
| Workday Canberra International | Canberra | $236,250 | 2024–present | Hard |
| WTA 125 Perth | Perth | $115,000 | 2027–present | Hard |

=== South America ===
==== Argentina ====
| Tournament | City | Prize money | Year(s) | Surface |
|---|---|---|---|---|
| IEB+ Argentina Open | Buenos Aires | $115,000 | 2021–present | Clay |
| Tucumán Open by McDonald's | San Miguel de Tucumán | $115,000 | 2025 | Clay |

==== Bolivia ====
| Tournament | City | Prize money | Year(s) | Surface |
|---|---|---|---|---|
| Bolivia Open | Santa Cruz de la Sierra | $115,000 | 2024 | Clay |

==== Brazil ====
| Tournament | City | Prize money | Year(s) | Surface |
|---|---|---|---|---|
| Curitiba Open | Curitiba | $115,000 | 2026–present | Clay |
| Engie Open | Florianópolis | $115,000 | 2023–2025 | Clay |
| Rio Ladies Open | Rio de Janeiro | $115,000 | 2025 | Clay |

==== Chile ====
| Tournament | City | Prize money | Year(s) | Surface |
|---|---|---|---|---|
| LP Open by IND | Colina | $115,000 | 2022–present | Clay |

==== Colombia ====
| Tournament | City | Prize money | Year(s) | Surface |
|---|---|---|---|---|
| Kia Open | Barranquilla | $115,000 | 2023–2024, 2026–present | Hard |
| Reto Win Tennis Cali Open | Cali | $115,000 | 2013, 2023–present | Clay |
| DIRECTV Open presentado por Compesar | Sopó | $115,000 | 2026–present | Clay |

==== Ecuador ====
| Tournament | City | Prize money | Year(s) | Surface |
|---|---|---|---|---|
| Quito Open | Quito | $115,000 | 2025–present | Clay |

==== Uruguay ====
| Tournament | City | Prize money | Year(s) | Surface |
|---|---|---|---|---|
| Montevideo Open | Montevideo | $115,000 | 2021–2023 | Clay |

== Historic names ==
2012–2020
WTA 125K Series

2021–present
WTA 125

== Prize money ==
The tournaments offer total prize money of $115,000–$200,000. An exception was made in case of 2020 Advantage Cars Prague Open which had a prize money of $3,125,000 which was funded by 2020 US Open organizers to make up for the lack of a qualifying draw as many low ranked players, mainly from Europe were unable to travel to New York due to COVID-19 pandemic.

== Points distribution ==
| Event | W | F | SF | QF | R16 | R32 | Q | Q2 | Q1 |
|---|---|---|---|---|---|---|---|---|---|
| Singles | 125 | 81 | 49 | 27 | 15 | 1 | 6 | 4 | 1 |
| Doubles | 125 | 81 | 49 | 27 | 1 | —N/a | | | |
| Doubles (8D) | 125 | 81 | 49 | 1 | —N/a | | | | |

== Singles champions ==
=== WTA 125K Series ===
| Tournament | 2012 | 2013 | 2014 | 2015 | 2016 | 2017 | 2018 | 2019 | 2020 |
|---|---|---|---|---|---|---|---|---|---|
| Newport Beach | Not an event | | | | | | (United States) Collins | (Canada) Andreescu | (United States) Brengle |
| Cali | ITF Women's Circuit | (Spain) Arruabarrena Vecino | Not an Event | | | | | | |
| Indian Wells | Not an event | | | | | | (Italy) Errani | (Switzerland) Golubic | (Romania) Begu |
| San Antonio | Not an event | | | | (Japan) Doi | Not an event | | | |
| Guadalajara | Not an event | | | | | | | (Russia) Kudermetova | Cancelled |
| Zhengzhou | Not an event | | ITF Women's Circuit | | | (China) Q Wang | (China) S Zheng | WTA Premier | |
| Xi'an | Not an event | | ITF Women's Circuit | Not an event | | | | | Cancelled |
| Anning | Not an event | | ITF Women's Circuit | | | | (Russia) Khromacheva | (China) S Zheng | Cancelled |
| West Hempstead | Not an event | | | | Cancelled | Not an event | | | |
| Bol | Not an event | | | | (Luxembourg) Minella | (Serbia) Krunić | (Slovenia) Zidanšek | (Slovenia) Zidanšek | Cancelled due to the coronavirus pandemic |
| Båstad | WTA International | | | | | | | (Japan) Doi | Cancelled due to the coronavirus pandemic |
| Karlsruhe | Not an event | | | | | | | (Romania) Țig | Cancelled due to the coronavirus pandemic |
| Chicago/New Haven | Not an event | | | | | | (Croatia) Martić | (Russia) Blinkova | Cancelled due to the coronavirus pandemic |
| Nanchang | Not an event | | (China) Peng | (Serbia) Janković | WTA International | | | | |
| Prague | Not an event | | | ITF Women's Circuit | | | | ITF Women's Tour | (Slovakia) Kučová |
| Suzhou | ITF Women's Circuit | (Israel) Pe'er | (Germany) Friedsam | ITF Women's Circuit | | | | ITF Women's Tour | Not an event |
| Portschach | WTA International | | | | Not an event | | | | Cancelled |
| Dalian | Not an event | | | (China) S Zheng | (Czech Republic) Kr Plíšková | (Ukraine) Kozlova | Not an event | | |
| Ningbo | ITF Women's Circuit | (Serbia) Jovanovski | (Poland) Linette | Not an event | | | | | |
| Warsaw | Not an event | | | | | | | | Cancelled |
| Nanjing | Not an event | (China) Zhang | Not an event | ITF Women's Circuit | Not an event | | | | |
| Pune or Mumbai | (Ukraine) Svitolina | Not an Event | | | | (Belarus) Sabalenka | (Thailand) Kumkhum | Not an Event | |
| Hua Hin | Not an event | | | (Kazakhstan) Shvedova | Cancelled | (Switzerland) Bencic | Not an event | WTA International | |
| Taipei | (France) Mladenovic | (Belgium) Van Uytvanck | (Russia) Diatchenko | (Hungary) Babos | (Russia) Rodina | (Switzerland) Bencic | (Thailand) Kumkhum | (Russia) Diatchenko | Cancelled |
| Houston | Not an event | | | | | | (China) Peng | (Belgium) Flipkens | Cancelled |
| Limoges | ITF Women's Circuit | | (Czech Republic) Smitková | (France) Garcia | (Russia) Alexandrova | (Romania) Niculescu | (Russia) Alexandrova | (Russia) Alexandrova | Cancelled |
| Carlsbad or Honolulu | WTA Premier | | Not an event | (Belgium) Wickmayer | (United States) Bellis | (China) Zhang | Exhibition event | | Not an event |

=== WTA 125 ===
| Tournament | 2021 | 2022 | 2023 | 2024 | 2025 | 2026 |
|---|---|---|---|---|---|---|
| Canberra | Not an event | | ITF Women's Tour | (Spain) Párrizas Díaz | (Japan) Ito | (Chinese Taipei) Garland |
| Manila | Not an event | | | | | (Colombia) Osorio |
| Cali | Not an event | | (Argentina) Podoroska | (Romania) Begu | (Austria) Kraus | (Spain) Romero Gormaz |
| Mumbai | Not an event | | | (Latvia) Semeņistaja | (Switzerland) Teichmann | (Thailand) Sawangkaew |
| Oeiras | Not an event | | | | | Korneeva (Note: As of 1 March 2022, the WTA announced that players from Russia and Belarus will not compete under the name or flag of Russia or Belarus due to the Russian invasion of Ukraine.) |
| Oeiras 2 | Not an event | | | | | (Ukraine) Snigur |
| Les Sables d'Olonne | Not an event | | | | | (Czech Republic) Šalková |
| Cancún | Not an event | | | | (Colombia) Arango | Not an event |
| Puerto Vallarta | Not an event | | | (United States) Kessler | (Romania) Cristian | Not an event |
| Marbella | Not an event | (Egypt) Sherif | Not an event | | | |
| San Luis Potosí | Not an event | | (Italy) Cocciaretto | (Argentina) Podoroska | Not an event | |
| Antalya | Not an event | | | (Spain) Bouzas Maneiro | (Romania) Todoni | (Japan) Uchijima |
| Antalya 2 | Not an event | | | | (Serbia) Danilović | (Ukraine) Kalinina |
| Antalya 3 | Not an event | | | | (Argentina) Sierra | (Ukraine) Kalinina |
| Dubrovnik | Not an event | | | | | (Spain) Lázaro García |
| Madrid | Not an event | ITF Women's Tour | | | | (Italy) Pigato |
| Oeiras 3 | ITF Women's Tour | | | (Netherlands) Lamens | (Hungary) Gálfi | (Poland) Chwalińska |
| Oeiras 4 | ITF Women's Tour | | | | | (France) Ferro |
| Saint-Malo | (Switzerland) Golubic | (Brazil) Haddad Maia | (United States) Stephens | (France) Boisson | (Japan) Osaka | (Japan) Uchijima |
| Reus/Lleida/Vic/ La Bisbal d'Empordà | Not an event | | (Romania) Cîrstea | (Czech Republic) Siniaková | (Hungary) Gálfi | (Australia) Kasatkina |
| Florence | Not an event | | (Italy) Paolini | Not an event | | |
| Jiujiang | Not held | | WTA 250 | | | (Chinese Taipei) Liang |
| Istanbul | Not an event | | | | | (Uzbekistan) Timofeeva |
| Paris | Not an event | (United States) Liu | (France) Parry | Shnaider | (United Kingdom) Boulter | (France) Parry |
| Bol/Makarska | (Italy) Paolini | (Germany) Niemeier | (Egypt) Sherif | (United States) Volynets | (Czech Republic) Bejlek | (Uzbekistan) Timofeeva |
| La Bisbal d'Empordà | ITF Women's Tour | | (Netherlands) Rus | (Argentina) Carlé | (Latvia) Semeņistaja | Not an event |
| Birmingham | WTA 250 | | | | (Belgium) Minnen | (Philippines) Eala |
| Ilkley | Not held | ITF Women's Tour | | | (United States) Jovic | (United States) Krueger |
| Modena | ITF Women's Tour | | | | | (Poland) Kawa |
| Brescia | Not held | ITF Women's Tour | | | | (Egypt) Sherif |
| Figueira da Foz | ITF Women's Tour | | | | | (Czech Republic) Viďmanová |
| Valencia | ITF Women's Tour | (China) Q Zheng | (Egypt) Sherif | (United States) Li | (Spain) Párrizas Díaz | (France) Burel |
| Grado | ITF Women's Tour | | | | (Czech Republic) Valentová | Not an event |
| Gaiba | Not an event | (Belgium) Van Uytvanck | (United States) Krueger | (United States) Parks | Not an event | |
| Newport | Not an event | | | | (United States) McNally | (Germany) Maria |
| Båstad | (Spain) Párrizas Díaz | (South Korea) Jang | (Serbia) Danilović | (Italy) Trevisan | (Italy) Cocciaretto | (Spain) Badosa |
| Contrexéville | ITF Women's Tour | (Italy) Errani | (Netherlands) Rus | (Italy) Bronzetti | (United Kingdom) Jones | (Egypt) Sherif |
| Charleston | (United States) Lepchenko | ITF Women's Tour | | (Italy) Cocciaretto | Not an event | |
| Belgrade | (Slovakia) Schmiedlová | Not an event | | | | |
| Iași | Not an event | (Romania) Bogdan | (Romania) Bogdan | WTA 250 | | |
| Kitzbühel | Not an event | | | | | (Austria) Kraus |
| Porto | ITF Women's Tour | | | | (Czech Republic) Valentová | (Uzbekistan) Timofeeva |
| Istanbul 2 | Not an event | | | | | (Thailand) Tararudee |
| Rome | Cancelled | ITF Women's Tour | | | (Croatia) Marčinko | (United Kingdom) Jones |
| Palermo | WTA 250 | | | | (United Kingdom) Jones | (United Kingdom) Jones |
| Târgu Mureș | Not an event | | | | | (Czech Republic) Samson |
| Concord | (Poland) Fręch | (United States) Vandeweghe | Not an event | | | |
| Kozerki/Warsaw | ITF Women's Tour | | (Ukraine) Yastremska | (United States) Parks | (Czech Republic) Siniaková | (United States) Lee |
| Hamburg | WTA 250 | | | (Hungary) Bondár | WTA 250 | |
| Barranquilla | Not an event | ITF Women's Tour | (Germany) Maria | (Argentina) Podoroska | Not an event | (United States) Liu |
| Chicago | (Denmark) Tauson | Not an event | (Bulgaria) Tomova | Not an event | | Not an event |
| Vancouver | Not an event | (Greece) Grammatikopoulou | Not held | Not an event | | (Australia) Preston |
| Stanford | Not an event | | (China) Y Wang | Not an event | | Not an event |
| Philadelphia | Not an event | | | | | (United States) Volynets |
| Guadalajara | WTA 250 | | Not an event | Rakhimova | (Philippines) Eala | Not an event |
| Montreux | Not an event | | | (Romania) Begu | (Poland) Chwalińska | (France) Ferro |
| Antalya 4 | Not an event | | | | | (Bulgaria) Dencheva |
| Changsha | Not an event | | | | (Slovenia) Erjavec | Not an event |
| Huzhou | Not an event | | | | (Slovenia) Erjavec | (Poland) Kawa |
| Karlsruhe | (Egypt) Sherif | (Egypt) Sherif | Not an event | | | |
| Portorož | WTA 250 | | Not an event | | | |
| Columbus | (Spain) Párrizas Díaz | Not an event | | | | |
| Bari/Foggia | Not an event | (Austria) Grabher | (Slovenia) Zidanšek | (Romania) Todoni | (Romania) Todoni | (Spain) Romero Gormaz |
| Bucharest | Not an event | (Romania) Begu | (Australia) Sharma | (Romania) Bulgaru | Not an event | |
| Budapest | Not an event | (Germany) Korpatsch | Not an event | | | |
| Ljubljana | Not an event | | (Spain) Bassols Ribera | (Switzerland) Teichmann | (Slovenia) Juvan | (Italy) De Stefano |
| San Sebastián | Not an event | ITF Women's Tour | Not an event | | Selekhmeteva | Not an event |
| Tolentino | Not an event | | | | (Ukraine) Oliynykova | (Austria) Grabher |
| Caldas da Rainha | ITF Women's Tour | | | | Iatcenko | (Italy) Pigato |
| Parma | WTA 250 | | (Romania) Bogdan | (Slovakia) Schmiedlová | (Egypt) Sherif | (Ukraine) Yastremska |
| Rouen | Not an event | (Belgium) Zanevska | (Switzerland) Golubic | WTA 250 | | |
| Ankara | Not an event | | | | | (Turkey) Cengiz |
| Adana | Not an event | | | | | (France) Jeanjean |
| Jingshan | Not an event | | | | (New Zealand) Sun | Shubladze |
| Suzhou | Not an event | | | | (Switzerland) Golubic | (Slovakia) Šramková |
| Samsun | Not an event | | | | (Slovenia) Juvan | (Turkey) Aksu |
| Rende | Not an event | | | | (Czech Republic) Bejlek | Not an event |
| Mallorca | Not an event | | | | (Argentina) Sierra | (Spain) Geerlings |
| Hong Kong | Not an event | | | (Australia) Tomljanović | Not an event | |
| Jinan | Not an event | | | ITF Women's Tour | (Indonesia) Tjen | Not an event |
| Rio de Janeiro | Not an event | | | | (Switzerland) Waltert | Not an event |
| Tampico | Not an event | (Italy) Cocciaretto | (United States) Bektas | (Canada) Stakusic | (Belgium) Vandewinkel | Not an event |
| Querétaro | Not an event | | | | (Czech Republic) Bejlek | (Canada) Andreescu |
| Rovereto | Not an event | | | | Selekhmeteva | (Canada) Andreescu |
| Courmayeur | WTA 250 | Not an event | | | | (Armenia) Charaeva |
| Lisbon | ITF Women's Tour | | | | | (France) Burel |
| Curitiba | Not an event | | | | | (France) Tubello |
| Luanda | Not an event | | | | | Lansere |
| Sopó | Not an event | | | | | (Canada) Andreescu |
| Santa Cruz | Not an event | | | (Romania) Todoni | Not an event | |
| Midland | (United States) Brengle | (United States) McNally | Kalinskaya | (Canada) Marino | Not an event | Charaeva |
| Taipei | Cancelled | | Not an event | | | |
| Charleston 2 | ITF Women's Tour | | | (Mexico) Zarazúa | Not an event | |
| Austin | Not an event | | | | (Mexico) Zarazúa | (Thailand) Tararudee |
| Tucumán | Not an event | | | | (Ukraine) Oliynykova | Not an event |
| Colina | ITF Women's Tour | (Egypt) Sherif | (Czech Republic) Bejlek | (Serbia) Stojanović | (Ukraine) Oliynykova | (Switzerland) Masarova |
| Florianópolis | Not an event | | (Australia) Tomljanović | (Poland) Chwalińska | (Austria) Grabher | Not an event |
| Buenos Aires | (Hungary) Bondár | (Hungary) Udvardy | (Brazil) Pigossi | (Egypt) Sherif | (Hungary) Udvardy | |
| Andorra la Vella | Not an event | (United States) Parks | (Spain) Bassols Ribera | Not an event | | |
| Montevideo | (France) Parry | Shnaider | (Mexico) Zarazúa | Not an event | | |
| Quito | Not an event | | | | (Slovenia) Hercog | |
| Angers | (Russia) Diatchenko | (United States) Parks | (France) Burel | (United States) Parks | (Uzbekistan) Rakhimova | |
| Limoges | (Belgium) Van Uytvanck | (Ukraine) Kalinina | (Spain) Bucșa | (Switzerland) Golubic | (Ukraine) Kalinina | |
| Seoul | (China) Zhu | WTA 250 | | WTA 500 | | WTA 250 |

== Doubles champions ==
=== WTA 125K Series ===
| Tournament | 2012 | 2013 | 2014 | 2015 | 2016 | 2017 | 2018 | 2019 | 2020 |
|---|---|---|---|---|---|---|---|---|---|
| Newport Beach | Not an event | | | | | | (Japan) Doi (Switzerland) Teichmann | (United States) Carter (United States) Shibahara | (United States) Carter (Brazil) Stefani |
| Cali | ITF Women's Circuit | (Colombia) Castaño (Colombia) Duque-Mariño | Not an Event | | | | | | |
| Indian Wells | Not an event | | | | | | (United States) Townsend (Belgium) Wickmayer | (Czech Republic) Kr Plíšková (Russia) Rodina | (United States) Muhammad (United States) Townsend |
| San Antonio | Not an event | | | | (Germany) Grönefeld (United States) Melichar | Not an event | | | |
| Guadalajara | Not an event | | | | | | | (United States) Sanchez (Hungary) Stollár | Cancelled |
| Zhengzhou | Not an event | | ITF Women's Circuit | | | (China) Han (China) Zhu | (China) Duan (China) Y Wang | WTA Premier | |
| Xi'an | Not an event | | ITF Women's Circuit | Not an event | | | | | Cancelled |
| Anning | Not an event | | ITF Women's Circuit | | | | (Slovenia) Jakupović (Russia) Khromacheva | (China) Peng (China) Yang | Cancelled |
| West Hempstead | Not an event | | | | Cancelled | Not an event | | | |
| Bol | Not an event | | | | (Switzerland) Knoll (Croatia) Martić | (Chinese Taipei) Chuang (Czech Republic) Voráčová | (Colombia) Duque-Mariño (China) Y Wang | (Switzerland) Bacsinszky (Luxembourg) Minella | Cancelled due to the coronavirus pandemic |
| Båstad | WTA International | | | | | | | (Japan) Doi (Russia) Vikhlyantseva | Cancelled due to the coronavirus pandemic |
| Karlsruhe | Not an event | | | | | | | (Spain) Arruabarrena (Czech Republic) Voráčová | Cancelled due to the coronavirus pandemic |
| Chicago/New Haven | Not an event | | | | | | (Germany) Barthel (Czech Republic) Kr. Plíšková | (Russia) Blinkova (Georgia (country)) Kalashnikova | Cancelled due to the coronavirus pandemic |
| Nanchang | Not an event | | (Chinese Taipei) Chuang (Japan) Namigata | (Chinese Taipei) Chang (China) Zheng | WTA International | | | | |
| Prague | Not an event | | | ITF Women's Circuit | | | | ITF Women's Tour | (Belarus) Marozava (Romania) Mitu |
| Suzhou | ITF Women's Circuit | (Hungary) Babos (Netherlands) Krajicek | (Chinese Taipei) C-w Chan (Chinese Taipei) Chuang | ITF Women's Circuit | | | | ITF Women's Tour | Not an event |
| Portschach | WTA International | | | | Not an event | | | | Cancelled |
| Dalian | Not an event | | | (China) K Zhang (China) Zheng | | (Chinese Taipei) Ya- hsu Lee (Japan) Takahata | (China) Lu (China) You | Not an event | |
| Ningbo | ITF Women's Circuit | (Chinese Taipei) Y-j Chan (China) S Zhang | (Australia) Rodionova (Ukraine) Savchuk | Not an event | | | | | |
| Warsaw | Not an event | | | | | | | | Cancelled |
| Nanjing | Not an event | (Japan) Doi (China) Xu | Not an event | ITF Women's Circuit | Not an event | | | | |
| Pune or Mumbai | (Russia) Bratchikova (Georgia (country)) Kalashnikova | Not an Event | | | | (Mexico) Rodríguez (Netherlands) Schoofs | (Russia) Dzalamidze (Russia) Kudermetova | Not an Event | |
| Hua Hin | Not an event | | | (China) Chen (China) Y Wang | Cancelled | (China) Duan (China) Y Wang | Not an event | WTA International | |
| Taipei | (Chinese Taipei) H-c Chan (France) Mladenovic | (France) Garcia (Kazakhstan) Shvedova | (Chinese Taipei) H-c Chan (Chinese Taipei) Y-j Chan | (Japan) Hisami (Japan) Takahata | (Russia) Dzalamidze (Russia) Kudermetova | (Russia) Kudermetova (Belarus) Sabalenka | (India) Raina (India) Thandi | (Chinese Taipei) Ya-hsu Lee (Chinese Taipei) Wu | Cancelled |
| Houston | Not an event | | | | | | (United States) Manasse (United States) Pegula | (Australia) Perez (Brazil) Stefani | Cancelled |
| Limoges | ITF Women's Circuit | | (Czech Republic) Siniaková (Czech Republic) Voráčová | (Czech Republic) Krejčíková (Luxembourg) Minella | (Belgium) Mertens (Luxembourg) Minella | (Russia) Savinykh (Belgium) Zanevska | (Russia) Kudermetova (Kazakhstan) Voskoboeva | (Spain) García Pérez (Spain) Sorribes Tormo | Cancelled |
| Carlsbad or Honolulu | WTA Premier | | Not an event | (Brazil) Cé (Paraguay) Cepede Royg | (Japan) Hozumi (Japan) Kato | (Chinese Taipei) S-y Hsieh (Chinese Taipei) S-w Hsieh | Exhibition event | | Not an event |

=== WTA 125 ===
| Tournament | 2021 | 2022 | 2023 | 2024 | 2025 | 2026 |
|---|---|---|---|---|---|---|
| Canberra | Not an event | | ITF Women's Tour | (Slovenia) Erjavec (Latvia) Semeņistaja | (Australia) Fourlis (Australia) Hule | Kozyreva; Shymanovich |
| Manila | Not an event | | | | | (Chinese Taipei) Liang (Hong Kong) Chong |
| Cali | Not an event | | (Poland) Falkowska (Poland) Kawa | (Slovenia) Erjavec (France) Mladenovic | (Brazil) Candiotto (Brazil) Pigossi | (United States) Rogers (United States) A Zamarripa |
| Mumbai | Not an event | | | (Slovenia) Jakupović (United States) Santamaria | Anshba; Pridankina | Iatcenko; Pridankina |
| Oeiras | Not an event | | | | | (United States) C Corley (United States) I Corley |
| Oeiras 2 | Not an event | | | | | (Slovakia) Hrunčáková (Czech Republic) Knutson |
| Les Sables d'Olonne | Not an event | | | | | (United States) Lee (Czech Republic) Sisková |
| Cancún | Not an event | | | | (Australia) Joint (Australia) Preston | Not an event |
| Puerto Vallarta | Not an event | | | Shymanovich (Mexico) Zarazúa | (United States) H Chang (United States) McHale | Not an event |
| Marbella | Not an event | (Romania) Bara (Germany) Gorgodze | Not an event | | | |
| San Luis Potosí | Not an event | | (Spain) Bolsova (Venezuela) Gámiz | (Hungary) Bondár (Slovenia) Zidanšek | Not an event | |
| Antalya | Not an event | | | (Italy) Moratelli (Italy) Rosatello | (Poland) Chwalińska (Czech Republic) Dețiuc | Kozyreva; Shymanovich |
| Antalya 2 | Not an event | | | | (Argentina) Carlé (Switzerland) Waltert | (France) Cascino (Argentina) Fossa Huergo |
| Antalya 3 | Not an event | | | | (Hungary) Bondár (Switzerland) Waltert | Kozyreva; Shymanovich |
| Dubrovnik | Not an event | | | | | (Czech Republic) Dețiuc (Czech Republic) Šalková |
| Madrid | Not an event | ITF Women's Tour | | | | (Spain) Burillo; Pridankina |
| Oeiras 3 | ITF Women's Tour | | | (Portugal) F Jorge (Portugal) M Jorge | (Portugal) F Jorge (Portugal) M Jorge | (Slovenia) Erjavec (France) Mladenovic |
| Oeiras 4 | ITF Women's Tour | | | | | (Belgium) Costoulas (Portugal) M Jorge |
| Saint-Malo | (United States) Christian (United States) Santamaria | (Japan) Hozumi (Japan) Ninomiya | (Belgium) Minnen (Netherlands) Schoofs | Anshba; Dețiuc | (United Kingdom) Lumsden (Japan) Ninomiya | (Netherlands) Haverlag (United Kingdom) Lumsden |
| Reus/Lleida/Vic/ La Bisbal d'Empordà | Not an event | | (Australia) Hunter (Australia) Perez | (United States) Melichar-Martinez (Australia) Perez | (Canada) Andreescu (Indonesia) Sutjiadi | Pridankina (China) Tang |
| Florence | Not an event | | (Germany) Heisen (Estonia) Neel | Not an event | | |
| Jiujiang | Not held | | WTA 250 | | | (Chinese Taipei) Y-hsi Lee (China) Ye |
| Istanbul | Not an event | | | | | Kozyreva (Brazil) Pigossi |
| Paris | Not an event | (Brazil) Haddad Maia (France) Mladenovic | (Kazakhstan) Danilina; Zvonareva | (United States) Muhammad (Indonesia) Sutjiadi | Khromacheva (Hungary) Stollár | (Japan) Aoyama (Chinese Taipei) Liang |
| Bol/Makarska | (Spain) Bolsova (Poland) Kawa | (Slovenia) Jakupović (Croatia) Lukas | (Estonia) Neel (Chinese Taipei) Wu | (United States) Santamaria; Shymanovich | (Czech Republic) Malečková (Czech Republic) Škoch | (Netherlands) Haverlag (Switzerland) Waltert |
| La Bisbal d'Empordà | ITF Women's Tour | | (United States) Dolehide; Shnaider | (Czech Republic) Kolodziejová (Czech Republic) Sisková | (Belgium) Kempen (Czech Republic) Sisková | Not an event |
| Birmingham | WTA 250 | | | | (Australia) Aiava (Spain) Bucșa | (Australia) Gibson (Indonesia) Tjen |
| Ilkley | Not held | ITF Women's Tour | | | (Netherlands) Haverlag (Switzerland) Waltert | (United Kingdom) Christie (United Kingdom) Silva |
| Modena | ITF Women's Tour | | | | | (Spain) Cavallé Reimers (Belgium) Salden |
| Brescia | Not held | ITF Women's Tour | | | | (Slovenia) Jakupović (Slovenia) Radišić |
| Figueira da Foz | ITF Women's Tour | | | | | (Slovakia) Hrunčáková (Slovakia) Kužmová |
| Valencia | ITF Women's Tour | (Spain) Bolsova (Spain) Masarova | (Spain) Bolsova (Venezuela) Gámiz | (Poland) Piter (Hungary) Stollár | Kozyreva; Shymanovich | (Slovenia) Jakupović (Switzerland) Karamoko |
| Grado | ITF Women's Tour | | | | (United States) Gleason (Brazil) Martins | Not an event |
| Gaiba | Not an event | (United States) Brengle (United States) Liu | (South Korea) Han (South Korea) Jang | (United States) Baptiste (United States) Parks | Not an event | |
| Newport | Not an event | | | | (United States) C Corley (United States) I Corley | Shymanovich (United States) Volynets |
| Båstad | (Sweden) Björklund (Switzerland) Küng | (Japan) Doi (Sweden) Peterson | Khromacheva (Hungary) Udvardy | (Thailand) Plipuech (Chinese Taipei) Tsao | (Czech Republic) Malečková (Czech Republic) Škoch | (Colombia) Arango (Switzerland) Waltert |
| Contrexéville | ITF Women's Tour | (Norway) Eikeri (Slovakia) Mihalíková | (Spain) Bucșa; Fomina-Klotz | (Georgia (country)) Kalashnikova; Shymanovich | (United States) Gleason (Brazil) Martins | (France) Cascino (Argentina) Fossa Huergo |
| Charleston | (Chinese Taipei) Liang (Canada) Marino | ITF Women's Tour | | (Australia) Gadecki (United Kingdom) Nicholls | Not an event | |
| Belgrade | (Belarus) Govortsova (Belarus) Marozava | Not an event | | | | |
| Iași | Not an event | Astakhova (Romania) Roșca | (Slovenia) Erjavec (Slovenia) Jakupović | WTA 250 | | |
| Kitzbühel | Not an event | | | | | (United Kingdom) Barnett (France) Lechemia |
| Porto | ITF Women's Tour | | | | (United States) C Corley (United States) I Corley | (Portugal) F Jorge (Portugal) M Jorge |
| Istanbul 2 | Not an event | | | | | (Japan) Shibahara; Zvonareva |
| Rome | Cancelled | ITF Women's Tour | | | (Chinese Taipei) I-h Cho (Chinese Taipei) Y-t Cho | (France) Cascino (China) Feng |
| Palermo | WTA 250 | | | | (France) Cascino (China) Feng | Tikhonova (Slovenia) Zidanšek |
| Târgu Mureș | Not an event | | | | | (Croatia) Ćirić Bagarić (Italy) Moratelli |
| Concord | (Thailand) Plipuech (Indonesia) Rompies | Flink (United States) Vandeweghe | Not an event | | | |
| Kozerki/Warsaw | ITF Women's Tour | | (Poland) Kawa (France) Lechemia | (Poland) Falkowska (Poland) Kubka | (Poland) Falkowska (Czech Republic) Šalková | (Poland) Falkowska (United States) Smith |
| Hamburg | WTA 250 | | | (Hungary) Bondár (Belgium) Zimmermann | WTA 250 | |
| Barranquilla | Not an event | ITF Women's Tour | (Greece) Grammatikopoulou (Greece) Papamichail | (United States) Failla (Japan) Kuwata | Not an event | (United States) McAdoo (United States) Rogers |
| Chicago | (Japan) Hozumi (Thailand) Plipuech | Not an event | (Norway) Eikeri (Estonia) Neel | Not an event | | Not an event |
| Vancouver | Not an event | (Japan) Kato (United States) Muhammad | Not held | Not an event | | (United States) Dolehide (Canada) Vagramov |
| Stanford | Not an event | | (United Kingdom) Burrage (Australia) Gadecki | Not an event | | Not an event |
| Philadelphia | Not an event | | | | | (Netherlands) Haverlag (Slovenia) Radišić |
| Guadalajara | WTA 250 | | Not an event | (Poland) Piter (Hungary) Stollár | Kozyreva; Shymanovich | Not an event |
| Montreux | Not an event | | | (United States) Gleason (Brazil) Martins | Selekhmeteva (Switzerland) Waltert | (Argentina) Fossa Huergo (Czech Republic) Havlíčková |
| Antalya 4 | Not an event | | | | | (Czech Republic) Kučmová (Czech Republic) Laboutková |
| Changsha | Not an event | | | | (Hong Kong) Chong (Chinese Taipei) Liang | Not an event |
| Huzhou | Not an event | | | | (Slovenia) Erjavec (Kazakhstan) Kulambayeva | Lansere; Zolotareva |
| Karlsruhe | (Romania) Bara (Georgia (country)) Gorgodze | (Egypt) Sherif (Hungary) Udvardy | Not an event | | | |
| Portorož | WTA 250 | | Not an event | | | |
| Columbus | (China) X Wang (China) Zheng | Not an event | | | | |
| Bari/Foggia | Not an event | (Italy) Cocciaretto (Serbia) Danilović | (Poland) Kawa (Czech Republic) Sisková | (Kazakhstan) Danilina; Khromacheva | Kozyreva; Shymanovich | (Chinese Taipei) I-h Cho (Chinese Taipei) Y-t Cho |
| Bucharest | Not an event | (Spain) Bolsova (Venezuela) Gámiz | (Italy) Moratelli (Italy) Rosatello | (France) Monnet (Latvia) Semeņistaja | Not an event | |
| Budapest | Not an event | (Hungary) Bondár (Belgium) Zimmermann | Not an event | | | |
| Ljubljana | Not an event | | Anshba (United States) Gleason | (Italy) Brancaccio (Spain) Romero Gormaz | (Czech Republic) Škoch (Switzerland) Waltert | (Croatia) Ćirić Bagarić (Italy) Moratelli |
| San Sebastián | Not an event | ITF Women's Tour | Not an event | | Tikhonova (Croatia) Würth | Not an event |
| Tolentino | Not an event | | | | (Czech Republic) Malečková (Czech Republic) Škoch | (Georgia (country)) Gorgodze (Greece) Papamichail |
| Caldas da Rainha | ITF Women's Tour | | | | (United Kingdom) Dart (United Kingdom) Lumsden | (Australia) Da Silva-Fick (Kazakhstan) Kulambayeva |
| Parma | WTA 250 | | (Slovenia) Jakupović; Khromacheva | (Kazakhstan) Danilina; Khromacheva | (Czech Republic) Malečková (Czech Republic) Škoch | (Chinese Taipei) I-h Cho (Chinese Taipei) Y-t Cho |
| Rouen | Not an event | (Georgia (country)) Dzalamidze; Rakhimova | (United Kingdom) Lumsden (France) Ponchet | WTA 250 | | |
| Ankara | Not an event | | | | | (Poland) Falkowska (United States) Smith |
| Adana | Not an event | | | | | (Italy) Moratelli (Czech Republic) Valdmannová |
| Jingshan | Not an event | | | | (Hong Kong) Chong (Chinese Taipei) Liang | (United Kingdom) Brooks (United Kingdom) Rajecki |
| Suzhou | Not an event | | | | (Indonesia) Sutjiadi (Indonesia) Tjen | (Chinese Taipei) Li (China) Y Zhang |
| Samsun | Not an event | | | | (Switzerland) Karamoko (France) Rakotomanga Rajaonah | Pridankina; Tikhonova |
| Rende | Not an event | | | | (Italy) Fossa Huergo (Georgia (country)) Gorgodze | Not an event |
| Mallorca | Not an event | | | | (Czech Republic) Malečková (Czech Republic) Škoch | (Croatia) Ćirić Bagarić (Italy) Moratelli |
| Hong Kong | Not an event | | | (Romania) Niculescu (Romania) Ruse | Not an event | |
| Jinan | Not an event | | | ITF Women's Tour | Pridankina; Reyngold | Not an event |
| Rio de Janeiro | Not an event | | | | (Spain) Romero Gormaz (Croatia) Würth | Not an event |
| Tampico | Not an event | (Slovakia) Mihalíková (Indonesia) Sutjiadi | Rakhimova; Tikhonova | (United States) C Corley (Canada) Marino | (Canada) Cross (United Kingdom) Rajecki | Not an event |
| Querétaro | Not an event | | | | (Spain) Herrero Liñana (Ukraine) Strakhova | (Belgium) Costoulas (Ukraine) Strakhova |
| Rovereto | Not an event | | | | (Czech Republic) Malečková (Czech Republic) Škoch | (Netherlands) Haverlag (Poland) Kubka |
| Courmayeur | WTA 250 | Not an event | | | | (United States) Harrison (United States) Hewitt |
| Lisbon | ITF Women's Tour | | | | | (Slovenia) Jakupović (Slovenia) Radišić |
| Curitiba | Not an event | | | | | (Slovenia) Jakupović (Slovenia) Radišić |
| Luanda | Not an event | | | | | (Burundi) Nahimana (Kenya) Okutoyi |
| Sopó | Not an event | | | | | (Slovenia) Erjavec (Kazakhstan) Kulambayeva |
| Santa Cruz | Not an event | | | (Italy) Brancaccio (Spain) Romero Gormaz | Not an event | |
| Midland | (United Kingdom) Dart (United States) Muhammad | (United States) Muhammad (United States) Parks | (United States) Baptiste (United States) Osuigwe | (United Kingdom) Appleton (United Kingdom) Lumsden | Not an event | (United States) Santamaria (China) Tang |
| Taipei | Cancelled | | Not an event | | | |
| Charleston 2 | ITF Women's Tour | | | (Italy) Brancaccio (Spain) Romero Gormaz | Not an event | |
| Austin | Not an event | | | | Kozyreva; Shymanovich | (Chinese Taipei) H-c Chan (Japan) Kato |
| Tucumán | Not an event | | | | (Netherlands) Tran; Zolotareva | Not an event |
| Colina | ITF Women's Tour | Sizikova (Indonesia) Sutjiadi | (Germany) Lohoff (Switzerland) Perrin | (Egypt) Sherif (Serbia) Stojanović | (Argentina) Carlé (Spain) Sorribes Tormo | (Slovenia) Erjavec (Kazakhstan) Kulambayeva |
| Florianópolis | Not an event | | (Italy) Errani (France) Jeanjean | (Poland) Chwalińska (Brazil) Pigossi | (Spain) Burillo (Georgia (country)) Gorgodze | Not an event |
| Buenos Aires | (Romania) Bara (Georgia (country)) Gorgodze | (Romania) Bara (Italy) Errani | (Argentina) Carlé (Greece) Papamichail | (Poland) Chwalińska (Poland) Kawa | (Spain) Herrero Liñana (Brazil) Pigossi | |
| Andorra la Vella | Not an event | (Spain) Bucșa (Poland) Falkowska | Andreeva (Switzerland) Naef | Not an event | | |
| Montevideo | (Romania) Bara (Georgia (country)) Gorgodze | (Brazil) Martins (Brazil) Stefani | (Argentina) Carlé (Argentina) Riera | Not an event | | |
| Quito | Not an event | | | | (Ukraine) Strakhova; Tikhonova | |
| Angers | (Slovakia) Mihalíková (Belgium) Minnen | (United States) Parks (China) S Zhang | (Spain) Bucșa (Romania) Niculescu | (Romania) Niculescu (Romania) Ruse | (Germany) Korpatsch (France) Ponchet | |
| Limoges | (Romania) Niculescu (Russia) Zvonareva | (Georgia (country)) Kalashnikova (Ukraine) Kostyuk | (Spain) Bucșa; Sizikova | (France) Jacquemot (France) Rouvroy | (Spain) Bucșa (China) S Zhang | |
| Seoul | (South Korea) Choi (South Korea) Han | WTA 250 | | WTA 500 | | WTA 250 |

== Records ==
- as of 23 November 2026

=== Most titles by player ===
| No. | Singles |
|---|---|
| 10 | (Egypt) Mayar Sherif |
| 5 | (Switzerland) Viktorija Golubic |
| 5 | (United States) Alycia Parks |
| 4 | (Canada) Bianca Andreescu |
| 4 | (Romania) Irina-Camelia Begu |
| 4 | (Czech Republic) Sára Bejlek |
| 4 | (Italy) Elisabetta Cocciaretto |
| 4 | (United Kingdom) Francesca Jones |
| 4 | (Ukraine) Anhelina Kalinina |
| 4 | (Spain) Nuria Párrizas Díaz |
| 4 | (Romania) Anca Todoni |

| No. | Doubles |
|---|---|
| 11 | (Belarus) Iryna Shymanovich |
| 9 | (Slovenia) Dalila Jakupović |
| 8 | (Russia) Maria Kozyreva |
| 8 | (Czech Republic) Miriam Škoch |
| 7 | (Slovenia) Veronika Erjavec |
| 7 | (Georgia (country)) Ekaterine Gorgodze |
| 7 | (Switzerland) Simona Waltert |
| 6 | (Spain) Cristina Bucșa |
| 6 | (Poland) Weronika Falkowska |
| 6 | (Russia) Irina Khromacheva |
| 6 | (Czech Republic) Jesika Malečková |
| 6 | (Italy) Angelica Moratelli |
| 6 | (Russia) Elena Pridankina |

=== Most finals by player ===
| No. | Singles |
|---|---|
| 15 | (Egypt) Mayar Sherif |
| 7 | (Switzerland) Viktorija Golubic |
| 7 | (Germany) Tatjana Maria |
| 7 | (Hungary) Panna Udvardy |
| 6 | (Canada) Bianca Andreescu |
| 6 | (Romania) Irina-Camelia Begu |
| 6 | (Italy) Elisabetta Cocciaretto |
| 6 | (Ukraine) Anhelina Kalinina |
| 6 | (United States) Alycia Parks |
| 6 | (France) Diane Parry |
| 6 | (Spain) Leyre Romero Gormaz |
| 6 | (Netherlands) Arantxa Rus |
| 6 | (China) Zhang Shuai |

| No. | Doubles |
|---|---|
| 16 | (Slovenia) Dalila Jakupović |
| 16 | (Georgia (country)) Oksana Kalashnikova |
| 15 | (Czech Republic) Miriam Škoch |
| 13 | (Czech Republic) Jesika Malečková |
| 12 | (Georgia (country)) Ekaterine Gorgodze |
| 11 | (Russia) Irina Khromacheva |
| 11 | (Italy) Angelica Moratelli |
| 11 | (Brazil) Laura Pigossi |
| 11 | (Belarus) Iryna Shymanovich |
| 10 | (Spain) Aliona Bolsova |
| 10 | (France) Estelle Cascino |

=== Most titles by country ===
| No. | Singles |
|---|---|
| 25 | United States |
| 16 | Romania |
| 14 | Spain |
| 13 | Czech Republic |
| 13 | France |
| 13 | Italy |
| 12 | Ukraine |
| 11 | China |
| 11 | Switzerland |
| 10 | Egypt |
| 10 | Russia (Note: Titles won by Russian athletes were not counted in their official tally since 1 March 2022 due to Russian Invasion of Ukraine.) |

| No. | Doubles |
|---|---|
| 40 | United States |
| 25 | Czech Republic |
| 23 | Chinese Taipei |
| 23 | Spain |
| 20 | China |
| 18 | Slovenia |
| 17 | France |
| 16 | Japan |
| 15 | Poland |
| 15 | Switzerland |

=== Youngest champions ===
Singles
| Age | Player | Title |
|---|---|---|
| 17 years, 191 days | (United States) Iva Jovic | Ilkley 2025 |
| 17 years, 233 days | (United States) CiCi Bellis | Honolulu 2016 |
| 17 years, 292 days | (Czech Republic) Sára Bejlek | Colina 2023 |
| 18 years, 60 days | (Ukraine) Elina Svitolina | Pune 2012 |
| 18 years, 115 days | (Czech Republic) Tereza Valentová | Grado 2025 |
| 18 years, 145 days | (Czech Republic) Laura Samson | Târgu Mureș 2026 |
| 18 years, 150 days | (Czech Republic) Tereza Valentová (2) | Porto 2025 |
| 18 years, 225 days | (Canada) Bianca Andreescu | Newport Beach 2019 |
| 18 years, 237 days | Alina Korneeva | Oeiras 2026 |
| 18 years, 239 days | Diana Shnaider | Montevideo 2022 |

Doubles
| Age | Player | Title |
|---|---|---|
| 18 years, 160 days | (Switzerland) Céline Naef | Andorra la Vella 2023 |
| 18 years, 183 days | (Czech Republic) Kateřina Siniaková | Limoges 2014 |
| 18 years, 297 days | (Czech Republic) Vendula Valdmannová | Adana 2026 |
| 18 years, 305 days | (Australia) Maya Joint | Cancún 2025 |
| 19 years, 46 days | (Chinese Taipei) Chan Hao-ching | Taipei 2012 |
| 19 years, 69 days | Diana Shnaider | La Bisbal d'Empordà 2023 |
| 19 years, 111 days | (Australia) Taylah Preston | Cancún 2025 |
| 19 years, 161 days | Erika Andreeva | Andorra la Vella 2023 |
| 19 years, 163 days | Elena Pridankina | Mumbai 2025 |
| 19 years, 174 days | (France) Kristina Mladenovic | Taipei 2012 |

=== Oldest champions ===
Singles
| Age | Player | Title |
|---|---|---|
| 38 years, 338 days | (Germany) Tatjana Maria | Newport 2026 |
| 36 years, 12 days | (Germany) Tatjana Maria (2) | Barranquilla 2023 |
| 35 years, 72 days | (United States) Varvara Lepchenko | Charleston 2021 |
| 35 years, 72 days | (Italy) Sara Errani | Contrexéville 2022 |
| 34 years, 321 days | (Slovenia) Polona Hercog | Quito 2025 |
| 34 years, 75 days | (Romania) Irina-Camelia Begu | Cali 2024 |
| 34 years, 13 days | (Romania) Irina-Camelia Begu (2) | Montreux 2024 |
| 33 years, 335 days | (Spain) Nuria Párrizas Díaz | Valencia 2025 |
| 33 years, 330 days | (Canada) Rebecca Marino | Midland 2024 |
| 33 years, 311 days | (Belgium) Kirsten Flipkens | Houston 2019 |

Doubles
| Age | Player | Title |
|---|---|---|
| 41 years, 314 days | Vera Zvonareva | Istanbul 2026 |
| 38 years, 255 days | Vera Zvonareva (2) | Paris 2023 |
| 38 years, 148 days | (Japan) Shuko Aoyama | Paris 2026 |
| 37 years, 103 days | Vera Zvonareva (3) | Limoges 2021 |
| 37 years, 74 days | (Romania) Monica Niculescu | Angers 2024 |
| 37 years, 11 days | (Romania) Monica Niculescu (2) | Hong Kong 2024 |
| 36 years, 327 days | (China) Zhang Shuai | Limoges 2025 |
| 36 years, 210 days | (Italy) Sara Errani | Florianópolis 2023 |
| 35 years, 302 days | (Czech Republic) Renata Voráčová | Karlsruhe 2019 |
| 35 years, 221 days | (Slovenia) Dalila Jakupović | Curitiba 2026 |

=== Highest-ranked winners ===
Singles
| Rank | Player | Title |
|---|---|---|
| 25 | (Serbia) Jelena Janković | Nanchang 2015 |
| 35 | (France) Caroline Garcia | Limoges 2015 |
| 36 | (China) Zhang Shuai | Honolulu 2017 |
| 37 | (Philippines) Alexandra Eala | Birmingham 2026 |
| 40 | (United Kingdom) Katie Boulter | Paris 2025 |
| 40 | (Egypt) Mayar Sherif | Valencia 2023 |
| 40 | (Czech Republic) Kateřina Siniaková | Lleida 2024 |
| 41 | (Serbia) Olga Danilović | Antalya 2025 |
| 41 | (Serbia) Bojana Jovanovski | Ningbo 2013 |
| 41 | (Romania) Irina-Camelia Begu | Bucharest 2022 |

Doubles
| Rank | Player | Title |
|---|---|---|
| 7 | (United States) Nicole Melichar-Martinez | Lleida 2024 |
| 7 | (Australia) Ellen Perez | Lleida 2024 |
| 11 | (Australia) Storm Hunter | Reus 2023 |
| 15 | Irina Khromacheva | Paris 2025 |
| 16 | (Australia) Ellen Perez (2) | Reus 2023 |
| 16 | (China) Zhang Shuai | Limoges 2025 |
| 18 | Vera Zvonareva | Istanbul 2026 |
| 25 | (China) Zhang Shuai (2) | Angers 2022 |
| 26 | (Kazakhstan) Anna Danilina | Paris 2023 |
| 27 | (Chinese Taipei) Chan Hao-ching | Taipei 2014 |
| 27 | (Germany) Anna-Lena Grönefeld | San Antonio 2016 |
| 27 | (France) Kristina Mladenovic | Cali 2024 |

=== Lowest-ranked winners ===
Singles
| Rank | Player | Title |
|---|---|---|
| 672 | (Slovenia) Polona Hercog | Quito 2025 |
| 543 | (Australia) Ajla Tomljanović | Florianópolis 2023 |
| 505 | (Spain) Ariana Geerlings | Mallorca 2026 |
| 432 | (Serbia) Nina Stojanović | Colina 2024 |
| 413 | (Chinese Taipei) Liang En-shuo | Jiujiang 2026 |
| 307 | (Turkey) Berfu Cengiz | Ankara 2026 |
| 301 | (France) Clara Burel | Valencia 2026 |
| 296 | (China) Peng Shuai | Houston 2018 |
| 280 | (Bulgaria) Rositsa Dencheva | Antalya 2026 |
| 267 | Polina Iatcenko | Caldas da Rainha 2025 |

Doubles
| Rank | Player | Title |
|---|---|---|
| unranked | (Canada) Bianca Andreescu | Vic 2025 |
| unranked | Varvara Flink | Concord 2022 |
| 1545 | (United States) Katie Volynets | Newport 2026 |
| 1436 | (United States) Christina McHale | Puerto Vallarta 2025 |
| 1101 | Oksana Selekhmeteva | Montreux 2025 |
| 1014 | (Italy) Elisabetta Cocciaretto | Bari 2022 |
| 944 | (Sweden) Mirjam Björklund | Båstad 2021 |
| 826 | (China) Wang Xinyu | Columbus 2021 |
| 809 | (Chinese Taipei) Hsieh Shu-ying | Honolulu 2017 |
| 770 | (France) Elsa Jacquemot | Limoges 2024 |

== See also ==
- WTA Tour
- Women's World Tennis Tour
- ATP Challenger Tour
- ATP 125 tournaments
- ATP 175 tournaments
