= 2016 Open de Limoges – Doubles =

Doubles
- 2016 Open de Limoges

Final
- Champions: (Belgium) Elise Mertens (Luxembourg) Mandy Minella
- Runners-up: (United Kingdom) Anna Smith (Czech Republic) Renata Voráčová
- Score: 6–4, 6–4

Events
Singles	Doubles
← 2015 ·	Open de Limoges	· 2017 →

Barbora Krejčíková and Mandy Minella were the defending champions, but Krejčíková chose not to participate. Minella partnered Elise Mertens, and successfully defended her title, defeating Anna Smith and Renata Voráčová in the final 6–4, 6–4.

== Seeds ==
1. (Ukraine) Lyudmyla Kichenok / (Ukraine) Nadiia Kichenok (first round)
2. (United Kingdom) Anna Smith / (Czech Republic) Renata Voráčová (final)
3. (Germany) Nicola Geuer / (United States) Nicole Melichar (first round)
4. (Czech Republic) Lenka Kunčíková / (Czech Republic) Karolína Stuchlá (semifinals)

== Draw ==
=== Key ===
- Q = Qualifier
- WC = Wild card
- LL = Lucky loser
- Alt = Alternate
- SE = Special exempt
- PR = Protected ranking
- ITF = ITF entry
- JE = Junior exempt
- w/o = Walkover
- r = Retired
- d = Defaulted
- SR = Special ranking

First round
1	(Ukraine) L Kichenok (Ukraine) N Kichenok	3	3
(Belgium) E Mertens (Luxembourg) M Minella	6	6
4	(Czech Republic) L Kunčíková (Czech Republic) K Stuchlá	5	6	[10]
WC	(France) A Hesse (United Kingdom) T Moore	7	4	[6]
(Russia) V Ivakhnenko (Belarus) L Marozava	6	5	[10]
3	(Germany) N Geuer (United States) N Melichar	4	7	[6]
(Poland) A Rosolska (Kazakhstan) G Voskoboeva	4	3
2	(United Kingdom) A Smith (Czech Republic) R Voráčová	6	6

Semifinals
(Belgium) E Mertens (Luxembourg) M Minella	6	6
4	(Czech Republic) L Kunčíková (Czech Republic) K Stuchlá	2	3
(Russia) V Ivakhnenko (Belarus) L Marozava	5	6	[6]
2	(United Kingdom) A Smith (Czech Republic) R Voráčová	7	1	[10]

Final
(Belgium) E Mertens (Luxembourg) M Minella	6	6
2	(United Kingdom) A Smith (Czech Republic) R Voráčová	4	4
