= Hawaii Tennis Open =

Hawaii Open Tennis Tournament

Tournament information
- Location: Honolulu; United States
- Venue: Stan Sheriff Center (2019); Blaisdell Arena (2018); Central Oahu Regional Park (2016,2017)
- Surface: Hard – indoors
- Draw: 5 men and 5 women
- Website: www.waikikicup.com

Current champions (2019 Hawaii Open)
- Men's singles: (United States) Sam Querrey
- Women's singles: (United States) Danielle Collins

The Hawaii Open is a hardcourt men's and women's professional tennis tournament held annually in Honolulu, Hawaii. The tournament features players from the WTA and ATP Tour. The invitational tournament occurs immediately before the ATP Tour and WTA Tour begin the new season in late December. As of July 2022, The Hawaii Open is now the Waikiki Cup.

The Hawaii Open features three rounds of single-elimination matches played over three days in a best two-out-of-three set format. Third sets are played as a tie-break with the first to 10 points declared the winner.

== History ==
The Hawaii Open tournament began as a WTA 125 event in 2016. During the first two years, the tournament was held at the Patsy T. Mink Central Oahu Regional Park during Thanksgiving week in late November.

=== 2018 Hawaii Open ===
In 2018, the tournament added a men's draw and became a men's and women's invitational tournament over three days, December 21, 22, and 23. It featured six men and six women and moved to the Blaisdell Arena in Honolulu. The tournament also featured a pro–am at Kailua Racquet Club and a Players Party held at the Prince Waikiki.

==== Men's entrants ====
1. Kei Nishikori (JPN)
2. Milos Raonic (CAN)
3. Ryan Harrison (USA)
4. Christian Harrison (USA)
5. Andre Ilagan (USA)
6. Phuc Huynh (USA)
7. Mackenzie McDonald (USA) (Note: McDonald participated in the Hawaii Open Pro Am and other special events. He withdrew from match play due to injury.)

==== Women's entrants ====
1. Elise Mertens (BEL)
2. Garbiñe Muguruza (ESP)
3. Eugenie Bouchard (CAN)
4. Monica Puig (PUR)
5. CoCo Vandeweghe (USA)
6. Christina McHale (USA)

=== 2019 Hawaii Open ===
The 2019 Hawaii Open presented by Ward Village and Hawaii Tourism was held December 26, December 27, and December 28, in Honolulu, at the Stan Sheriff Center. The tournament featured five men and five women and moved to the Stan Sheriff Center in Honolulu. The tournament also featured a pro–am at the Four Seasons Tennis Centre and a Players Party held at Ward Village.

==== Men's singles ====
===== Entrants =====
1. Taylor Fritz (USA)
2. Sam Querrey (USA)
3. Jordan Thompson (AUS) (Note: Jordan Thompson replaced Kei Nishikori)
4. Brandon Nakashima (USA)
5. Christian Harrison (USA)

===== Draw =====
Quarterfinals
1	(United States) Taylor Fritz
bye
(United States) Christian Harrison	0	1
(United States) Brandon Nakashima	6	6
(United States) Sam Querrey
bye
bye
2	(Australia) Jordan Thompson

Semifinals
1	(United States) Taylor Fritz	6^{4}	4
(United States) Brandon Nakashima	7^{7}	6
(United States) Sam Querrey	4	6	10
2	(Australia) Jordan Thompson	6	3	1

Final
(United States) Brandon Nakashima	4	7^{9}	11
(United States) Sam Querrey	6	6^{7}	13
Third Place Match
1	(United States) Taylor Fritz	–	–
2	(Australia) Jordan Thompson	–	–

==== Women's singles ====
===== Entrants =====
1. Angelique Kerber (GER)
2. Danielle Collins (USA) (Note: Danielle Collins replaced Maria Sharapova)
3. Misaki Doi (JPN)
4. Yanina Wickmayer (BEL)
5. Alyssa Tobita (USA)

===== Draw =====
Quarterfinals
1	(United States) Danielle Collins
bye
(United States) Alyssa Tobita	1	1
(Belgium) Yanina Wickmayer	6	6
(Japan) Misaki Doi
bye
bye
2	(Germany) Angelique Kerber

Semifinals
1	(United States) Danielle Collins	6	6
(Belgium) Yanina Wickmayer	3	4
(Japan) Misaki Doi	1	6^{2}
2	(Germany) Angelique Kerber	6	7^{7}

Final
1	(United States) Danielle Collins	w/o
2	(Germany) Angelique Kerber
Third Place Match

==== Mixed doubles ====
A mixed doubles match was added to replace the women's singles final due to player withdrawal.

- (United States) Christian Harrison / (United States) Danielle Collins def. (United States) Sam Querrey / (Belgium) Yanina Wickmayer, 6–4, 6–7^{(6–8)}, [10–6]

== Past finals ==
=== WTA 125 events ===
==== Singles ====
Year	Champion	Runner-up	Score
2016	(United States) Catherine Bellis	(China) Zhang Shuai	6–4, 6–2
2017	(China) Zhang Shuai	(South Korea) Jang Su-jeong	0–6, 6–2, 6–3

==== Doubles ====
Year	Champions	Runners-up	Score
2016	(Japan) Eri Hozumi (Japan) Miyu Kato	(United States) Nicole Gibbs (United States) Asia Muhammad	6–7^{(3–7)}, 6–3, [10–8]
2017	(Chinese Taipei) Hsieh Shu-ying (Chinese Taipei) Hsieh Su-wei	(Japan) Eri Hozumi (United States) Asia Muhammad	6–1, 7–6^{(7–3)}

=== Invitational tournaments ===
==== Men's singles ====
Year	Champion	Runner-up	Score
2018	(Japan) Kei Nishikori	(Canada) Milos Raonic	7–6, 7–6
2019	(United States) Sam Querrey	(United States) Brandon Nakashima	6–4, 6–7^{(7–9)}, [13–11]

==== Women's singles ====
Year	Champion	Runner-up	Score
2018	(Belgium) Elise Mertens	(Canada) Eugenie Bouchard	2–6, 7–5, [12–10]
2019	(United States) Danielle Collins	(Germany) Angelique Kerber	(walkover)

==== Mixed doubles ====
Year	Champions	Runners-up	Score
2019	(United States) Christian Harrison (United States) Danielle Collins	(United States) Sam Querrey (Belgium) Yanina Wickmayer	6–4, 6–7^{(6–8)}, [10–6]

== See also ==
- Hawaii Open – men's tournament (1974–1984)
- Oahu Open – men's tournament (1994)
