= CiCi Bellis =

American tennis player (born 1999)

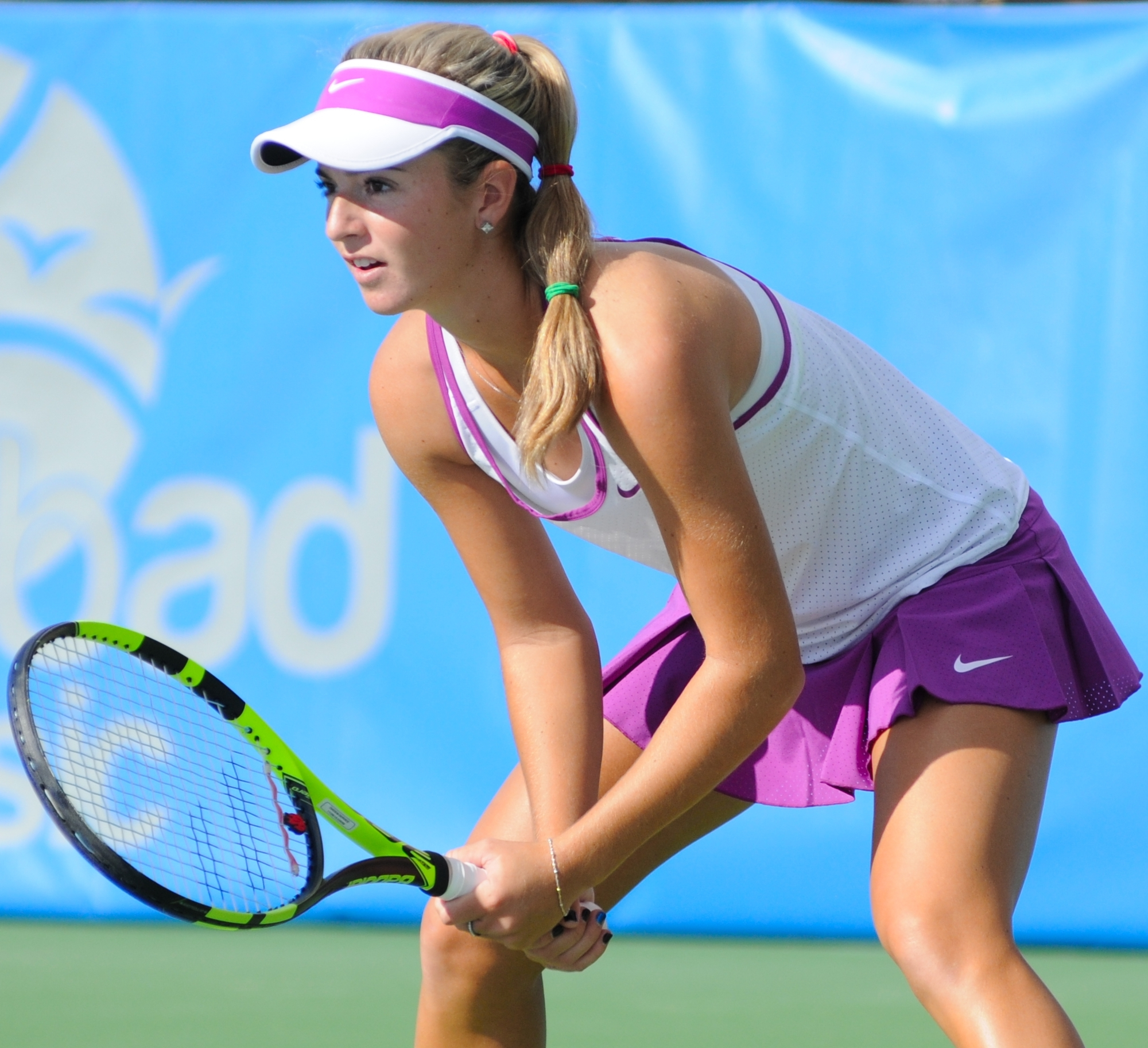
- Bellis at the 2015 Carlsbad Classic
- Full name: Catherine Cartan Bellis
- Country (sports): United States
- Residence: Lake Nona, Florida
- Born: April 8, 1999 (age 27) San Francisco, California
- Height: 1.68 m (5 ft 6 in)
- Turned pro: September 2016
- Retired: January 2022
- Plays: Right (two-handed backhand)
- Coach: Tom Gutteridge
- Prize money: US$ 1,431,153

Singles
- Career record: 138–67
- Career titles: 1 WTA Challenger, 7 ITF
- Highest ranking: No. 35 (August 14, 2017)

Grand Slam singles results
- Australian Open: 3R (2020)
- French Open: 3R (2017)
- Wimbledon: 1R (2017)
- US Open: 3R (2016)

Doubles
- Career record: 20–19
- Career titles: 2 ITF
- Highest ranking: No. 149 (July 17, 2017)

Grand Slam doubles results
- Australian Open: 1R (2018)
- Wimbledon: QF (2017)
- US Open: 1R (2016, 2017)

Catherine Cartan "CiCi" Bellis (born April 8, 1999) is an American former professional tennis player. In early 2018, she was the second youngest player in the top 100 of the WTA rankings. Bellis has a career-high ranking of world No. 35 by the Women's Tennis Association, which she achieved in August 2017. She is known for winning a match at the 2014 US Open as a 15 year old against a top-20 opponent, making her the youngest match-winner at the US Open since 1996.

Her biggest title came at the 2016 Hawaii Tennis Open, a WTA (Challenger) 125 event. She also won seven singles titles and two doubles titles on the ITF Circuit. Bellis had an accomplished junior season the same year she played in her first US Open, finishing the 2014 season as the ITF Junior World Champion for holding the year-end world No. 1 junior ranking. She also won the USTA National Junior Championship that year at 15 to become the youngest winner of the event since Lindsay Davenport in 1991.

== Early life and background ==
CiCi was born in San Francisco to Gordon and Lori Bellis, and grew up in Hillsborough and Atherton in northern California. CiCi started playing tennis at age three, but only chose to focus on it over soccer when she was ten years old. When she was young, she was coached by former top-100 player Monique Javer. As a child, Bellis aspired to go to college at Stanford, but ended up declining a scholarship to turn pro due to her success as a teenager. Her tennis idol is Kim Clijsters.

== Juniors ==
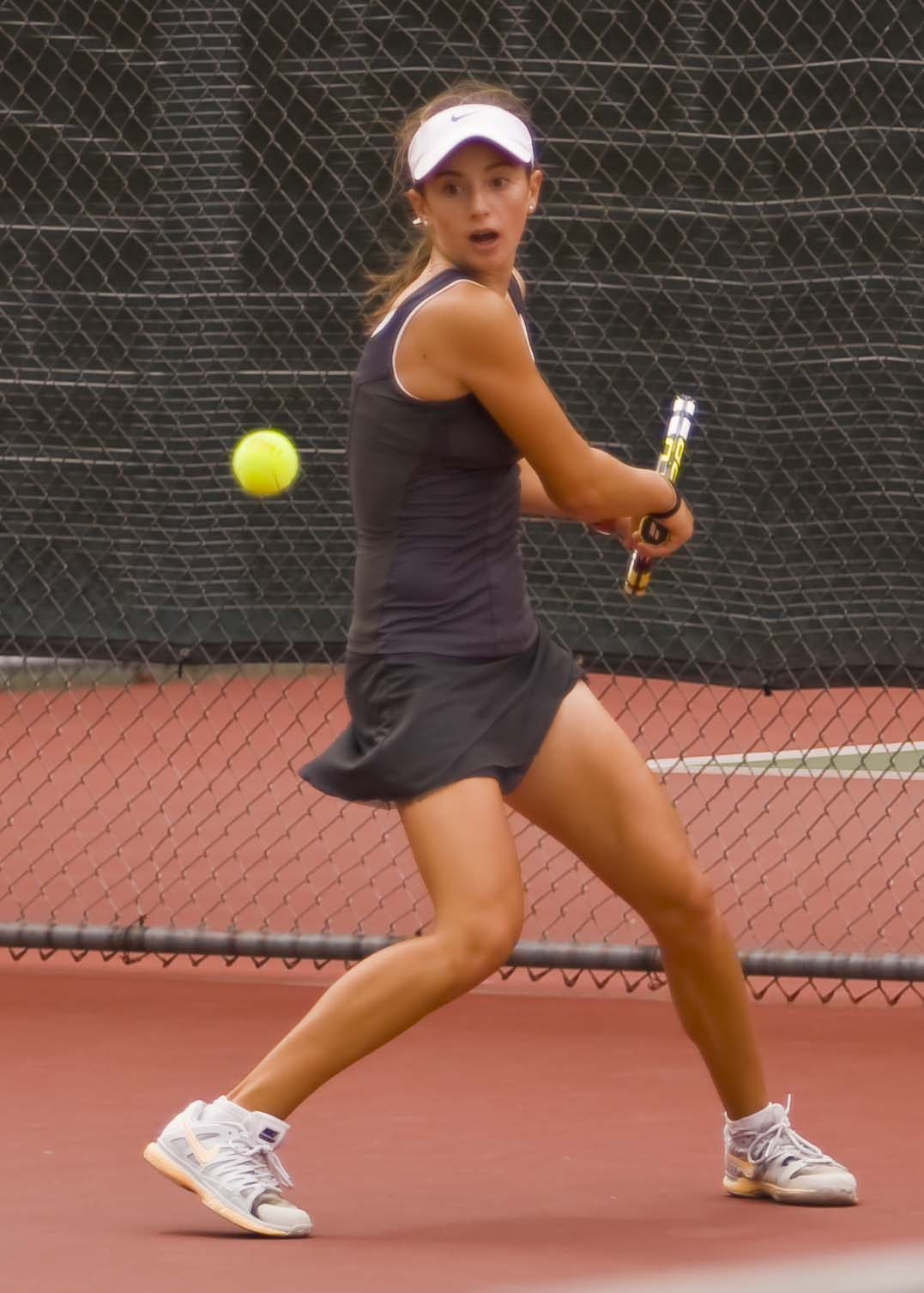
Bellis in 2013

As a junior in the United States, Bellis won six USTA National Junior Singles Championships and was ranked No. 1 in the G18s in April 2014.

Bellis began playing on the ITF Junior Circuit in late 2012 and mostly participated in low-level Grade-4 tournaments through the end of 2013. Her biggest triumph in the 2013 season was winning Les Petits As in France, a prestigious tournament for juniors between 12 and 14 years old.

In 2014, Bellis played only Grade-B1, Grade-1, and Grade-A tournaments, the three highest levels on the junior circuit. She had an impressive start to the year by reaching the final at her first five events, winning four of them. Specifically, she won the Copa del Café in Costa Rica, the USTA International Spring Championships and the Easter Bowl in the United States, and the Trofeo Bonfiglio in Italy. She followed up this success by also reaching the French Open doubles final with Markéta Vondroušová, which they lost in a match tiebreak. In contrast, Bellis struggled at the three Grand Slam singles events she entered that year, with her best result being a third round appearance at the French Open. Nonetheless, she took over the No. 1 ITF junior rank in early September on the strength of those four titles in the first half of the season.

In August 2014, Bellis won the USTA Girls' 18s National Championship, defeating Tornado Alicia Black in the final. At the age of 15 years and four months, she became the youngest winner of the event since Lindsay Davenport in 1991. With the victory, she also earned a wildcard into the main draw of the US Open. Bellis and Black were then both selected to represent the United States at the Junior Fed Cup along with Sofia Kenin. The trio won the title and Bellis went undefeated in seven matches. Later in the year, she also reached the semifinals at the Orange Bowl. Bellis finished the season as only the second American since 1982 to be No. 1 in the year-end girls' junior rankings, earning her the title of 2014 ITF World Champion.

Bellis closed out her junior career by reaching the semifinals at the 2015 French Open, her best singles result at a Grand Slam tournament and the only junior event she played that year.

== Professional ==
=== Early years: US Open match win ===
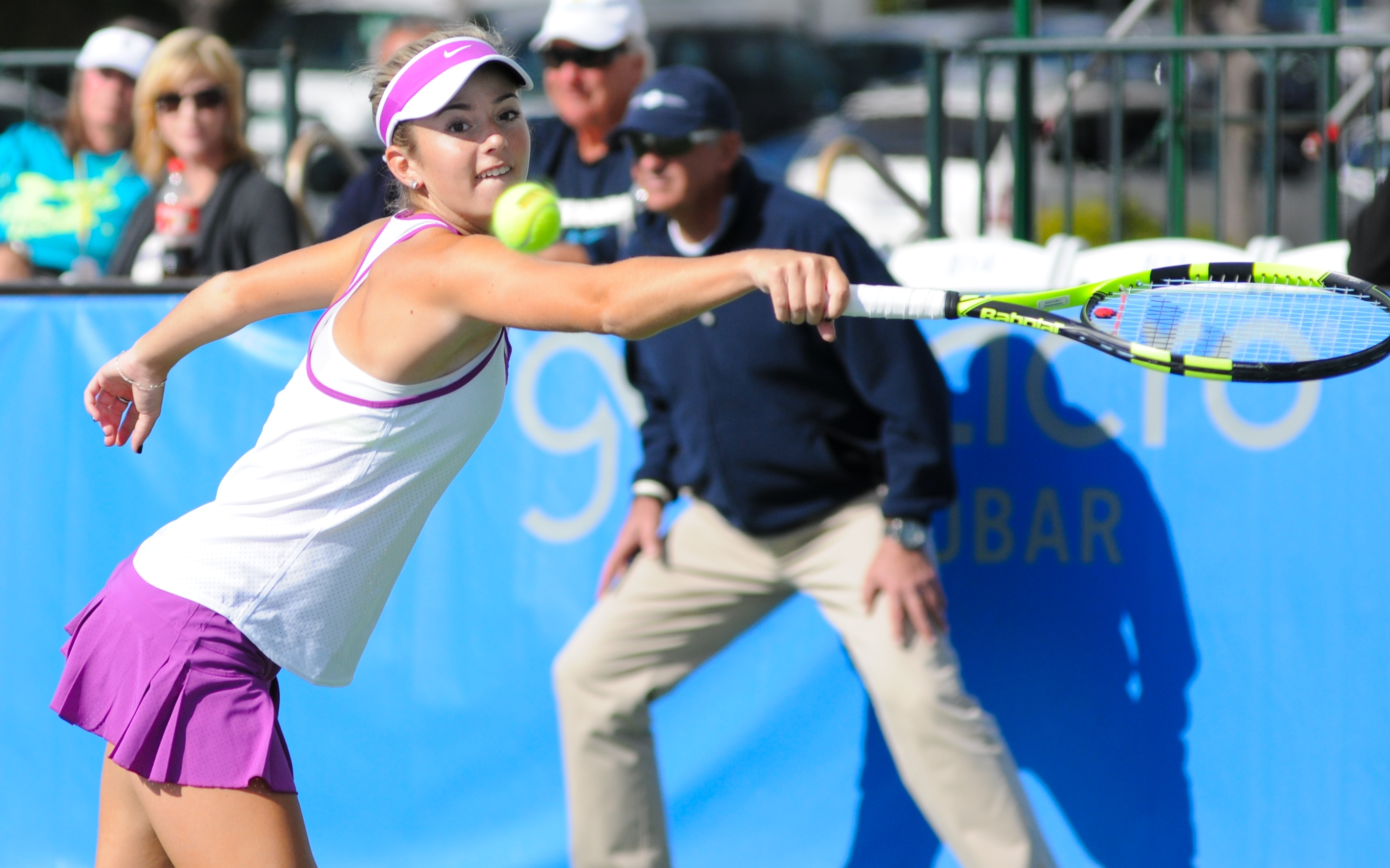
Bellis at the 2015 Carlsbad Classic

Bellis played her first few low-level professional events in early 2014, and won a doubles title at the $10k event in Orlando in March. She entered the 2014 US Open ranked No. 1208 with just two professional match wins in singles, both against players ranked outside the top 300. Nonetheless, she earned a wildcard into the tournament as the USTA junior national champion, making her the youngest woman in the main draw of a Grand Slam championship since Alizé Cornet at the 2005 French Open, and the youngest in the main draw of the US Open since 2004. In her WTA Tour-level debut, she upset 12th seed Dominika Cibulková, who was the runner-up at the Australian Open earlier in the year. With the victory, she became the youngest player to win a match at the US Open since Anna Kournikova reached the fourth round of the 1996 US Open at age 15. Bellis was also the youngest American to win a match at the US Open since Mary Joe Fernández in 1986. She was unable to win her next match, losing in three sets to 20 year old Zarina Diyas in the second round.

A month after the US Open, Bellis won her first two professional titles in singles in back-to-back weeks, both in South Carolina at the $25k level. In 2015, Bellis was handed a wildcard into the main draw of the Miami Open, her first Premier Mandatory tournament. She avenged her US Open loss to Zarina Diyas in the second round, before losing to No. 1 eventual champion, Serena Williams. This helped Bellis crack the top 200 of the WTA rankings for the first time. She would reach a new career-high of No. 152 in the world during the summer. Towards the end of the year, Bellis attempted to qualify for the US Open but fell one match short.

=== 2016: Top 100 debut, WTA 125 title ===
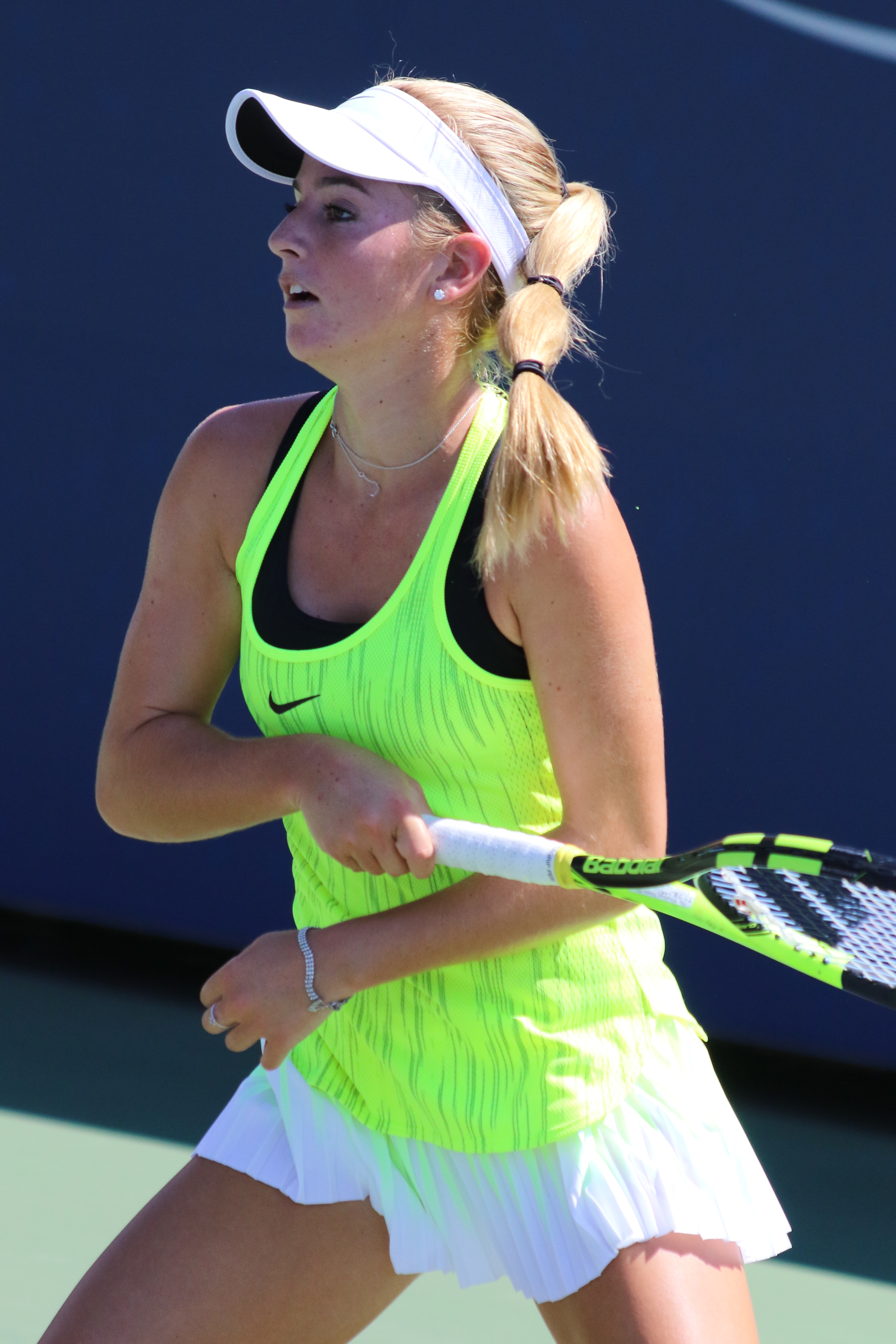
Bellis at the 2016 US Open

Bellis began the 2016 season ranked No. 248 and got off to a slow start. She did not return to the top 200 until the summer, after playing in the Stanford Classic, a Premier tournament. Bellis received a wildcard into the main draw and defeated No. 38, Jeļena Ostapenko, and compatriot Sachia Vickery, before losing to top seed Venus Williams. This was also her first WTA Tour quarterfinal. The following month, Bellis qualified for the main draw of the US Open, and improved on her result from two years earlier by reaching the third round, where she lost to the eventual champion Angelique Kerber, in straight sets. Her performance took her to a new career-high ranking of No. 120 and helped convince her to turn professional.

In her first tournament as a pro, Bellis entered the Tournoi de Québec and reached another WTA Tour quarterfinal. She won her final three tournaments of the year, including two $50k titles in Canada at Saguenay and Toronto, which brought her into the top 100 for the first time. Bellis then extended her match win-streak to 14 with a WTA 125 title at the Hawaii Open in Honolulu. She capped off the tournament with a win over world No. 23 Zhang Shuai in the final, the second highest ranked player she ever defeated. Bellis finished the year ranked No. 75 and the only player under 18 in the top 100.

=== 2017: Top 50, Newcomer of the Year ===
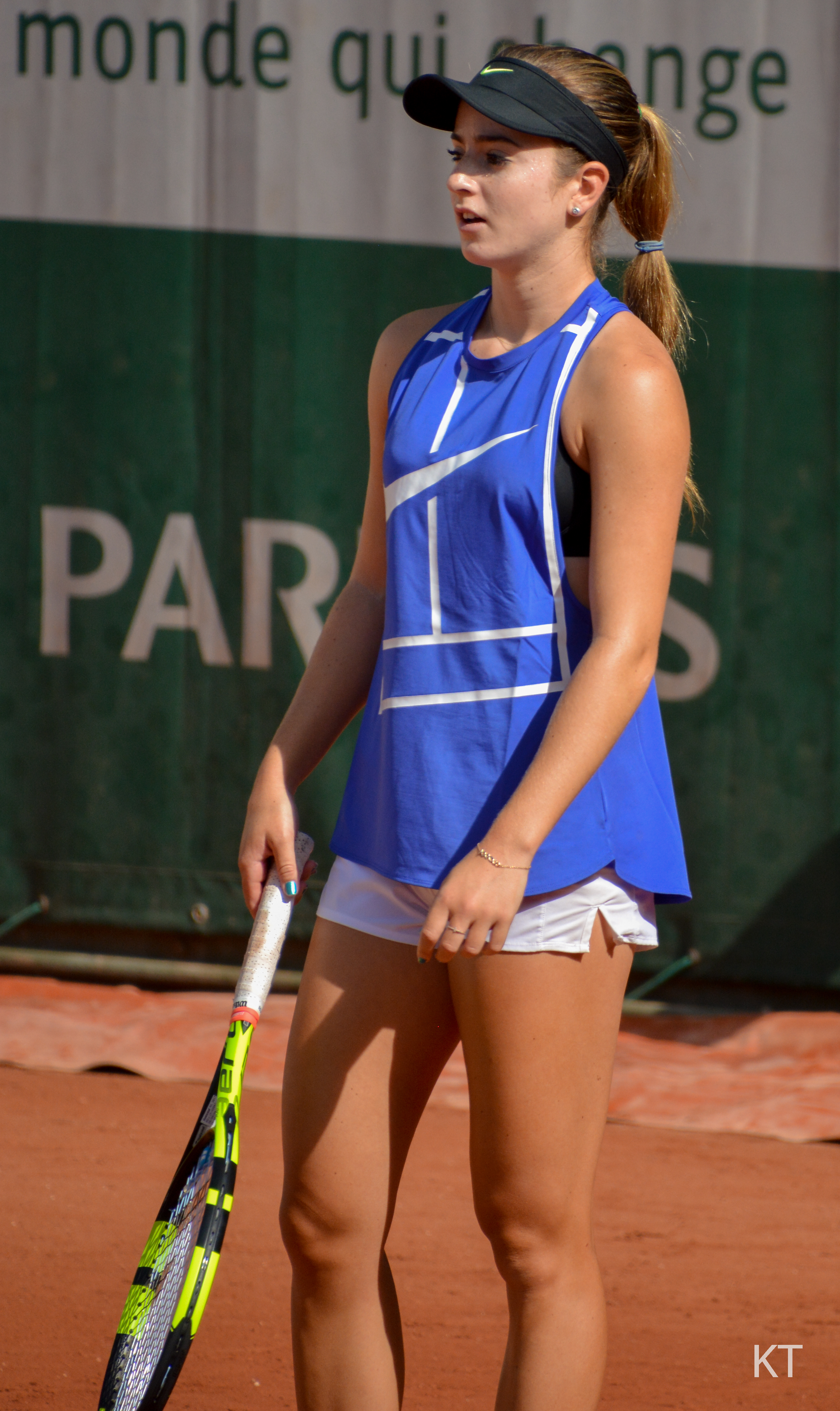
Bellis at the 2017 French Open

Bellis was forced to skip the Australian hard-court season in January due to left leg problems with her hip and hamstring. She played her first main draw of the year at the Dubai Championships, where she made her first Premier 5 quarterfinal and extended her main-draw win streak at all levels to 17 matches. In the third round, she defeated world No. 6, Agnieszka Radwańska, for her first top-ten victory before falling to Caroline Wozniacki. The upset made Bellis the youngest American to defeat a top-ten opponent since 2009.

Bellis played in her first WTA Tour clay-court season and reached quarterfinals at the Rabat Grand Prix in Morocco. She made another third-round appearance at a Grand Slam tournament at the French Open and became just the third American aged 18-or-under to make it this far at the major in Paris since the turn of the century. Bellis also had a strong grass-court season with her first WTA semifinal at the Mallorca Open. This success away from the hardcourts took her to No. 40 in the WTA rankings.

For the second straight year, Bellis had a great run at the Stanford Classic where she dropped just two games against No. 14 Petra Kvitová to get to the semifinals, where she lost to compatriot CoCo Vandeweghe. She played at the Rogers Cup and recorded a second top-ten victory, this time over No. 8 Svetlana Kuznetsova. This helped her reach a career-high of No. 35 in the world in mid-August. She then finished the season on a five match losing-streak. Nonetheless, Bellis won the WTA Newcomer of the Year award for her rankings achievement and her solid performance across all surfaces.

=== 2018: Plagued by injuries ===
Bellis defeated world No. 5, Karolína Plíšková, and reached the quarterfinals at the Qatar Ladies Open. Recurring wrist and elbow injuries sidelined Bellis after March. Bellis eventually had four surgeries in June, September, November and March 2019 on her wrist, arm and elbow.

=== 2019–2020: Comeback & retirement ===
Bellis returned to tennis in November 2019 at the Houston Challenger, after 18 months away from the game while she recovered from injuries. She lost in the third round to the eventual champion, Kirsten Flipkens.

At the 2020 Australian Open, Bellis defeated 22nd ranked Karolína Muchová in the second round, before falling to world No. 17, Elise Mertens.

Having competed her last match on the ITF Circuit in November 2020 in Charleston, she announced her retirement from professional tennis on Instagram on 19 January 2022.

== Grand Slam performance timelines ==
Key
W	F	SF	QF	#R	RR	Q#	P#	DNQ	A	Z#	PO	G	S	B	NMS	NTI	P	NH

(W) winner; (F) finalist; (SF) semifinalist; (QF) quarterfinalist; (#R) rounds 4, 3, 2, 1; (RR) round-robin stage; (Q#) qualification round; (P#) preliminary round; (DNQ) did not qualify; (A) absent; (Z#) Davis/Fed Cup Zonal Group (with number indication) or (PO) play-off; (G) gold, (S) silver or (B) bronze Olympic/Paralympic medal; (NMS) not a Masters tournament; (NTI) not a Tier I tournament; (P) postponed; (NH) not held; (SR) strike rate (events won / competed); (W–L) win–loss record.
To avoid confusion and double counting, these charts are updated at the conclusion of a tournament or when the player's participation has ended.

=== Singles ===
Tournament	2014	2015	2016	2017	2018	2019	2020	2021	SR	W–L	Win %
Australian Open	A	A	A	A	1R	A	3R	A	0 / 2	2–2	50%
French Open	A	Q1	A	3R	A	A	1R	A	0 / 2	2–2	50%
Wimbledon	A	A	A	1R	A	A	NH	A	0 / 1	0–1	0%
US Open	2R	Q3	3R	1R	A	A	2R	A	0 / 3	4–4	50%
Win–loss	1–1	0–0	2–1	2–3	0–1	0–0	3–3	0–0	0 / 8	8–9	47%

=== Doubles ===
Tournament	2016	2017	2018	2019	2020	2021	SR	W–L
Australian Open	A	A	1R	A	1R	A	0 / 2	0–2
French Open	A	A	A	A	A	A	0 / 0	0–0
Wimbledon	A	QF	A	A	NH	A	0 / 1	3–1
US Open	1R	1R	A	A	A	A	0 / 2	0–2
Win–loss	0–1	3–2	0–1	0–0	0–1	0–0	0 / 5	3–5

== WTA 125 finals ==
=== Singles: 1 (title) ===
Result	W–L	Date	Tournament	Surface	Opponent	Score
Win	1–0	Nov 2016	Hawaii Open, United States	Hard	(China) Zhang Shuai	6–4, 6–2

== ITF Circuit finals ==
=== Singles: 8 (7 titles, 1 runner-up) ===
Legend $80,000 tournaments (1–0) $50,000 tournaments (2–0) $25,000 tournaments (4–1)	Finals by surface Hard (7–1)

Result	W–L	Date	Tournament	Tier	Surface	Opponent	Score
Win	1–0	Oct 2014	ITF Rock Hill, United States	25,000	Hard	(United States) Lauren Embree	6–4, 6–0
Win	2–0	Oct 2014	ITF Florence, United States	25,000	Hard	(Belgium) Ysaline Bonaventure	6–2, 6–1
Win	3–0	Feb 2015	Rancho Santa Fe Open, United States	25,000	Hard	(United States) Maria Sanchez	6–2, 6–0
Loss	3–1	Feb 2016	ITF Surprise, United States	25,000	Hard	(United States) Jamie Loeb	6–3, 1–6, 3–6
Win	4–1	Jun 2016	ITF Sumter, United States	25,000	Hard	(Russia) Valeria Solovyeva	6–1, 6–3
Win	5–1	Oct 2016	Challenger de Saguenay, Canada	50,000	Hard (i)	(Canada) Bianca Andreescu	6–4, 6–2
Win	6–1	Nov 2016	Toronto Challenger, Canada	50,000	Hard (i)	(Czech Republic) Jesika Malečková	6–2, 1–6, 6–3
Win	7–1	Oct 2020	Tennis Classic of Macon, United States	80,000	Hard	(Ukraine) Marta Kostyuk	6–4, 6–7^{(4)}, ret.

=== Doubles: 2 (2 titles) ===
Legend $100,000 tournaments (1–0) $10,000 tournaments (1–0)	Finals by surface Hard (1–0) Clay (1–0)

Result	W–L	Date	Tournament	Tier	Surface	Partner	Opponents	Score
Win	1–0	Mar 2014	ITF Orlando, United States	10,000	Clay	(United States) Alexis Nelson	(Australia) Sally Peers (United States) Natalie Pluskota	6–2, 0–6, [11–9]
Win	2–0	Feb 2016	Midland Tennis Classic, United States	100,000	Hard (i)	(United States) Ingrid Neel	(United Kingdom) Naomi Broady (United States) Shelby Rogers	6–2, 6–4

== Junior Grand Slam tournament final ==
=== Girls' doubles: 1 (runner-up) ===
Result	Year	Tournament	Surface	Partner	Opponents	Score
Loss	2014	French Open	Clay	(Czech Republic) Markéta Vondroušová	(Romania) Ioana Ducu (Romania) Ioana Loredana Roșca	1–6, 7–5, [9–11]

== Head-to-head record ==
=== Wins over top-10 players ===
Bellis has a 3–6 win/loss record against players who were in the top 10 at the moment of the match.

Season	2015	2016	2017	2018	2019	2020	2021	Total
Wins	0	0	2	1	0	0	0	3

#	Player	Rank	Event	Surface	Rd	Score	CCB Rk
2017
1.	(Poland) Agnieszka Radwańska	No. 6	Dubai Championships	Hard	3R	6–4, 4–6, 6–2	No. 70
2.	(Russia) Svetlana Kuznetsova	No. 8	Canadian Open	Hard	2R	6–4, 7–5	No. 36
2018
3.	(Czech Republic) Karolína Plíšková	No. 5	Qatar Ladies Open	Hard	3R	7–6^{(7–4)}, 6–3	No. 48

Awards
Preceded by (Switzerland) Belinda Bencic	ITF Junior World Champion; 2014	Succeeded by (Hungary) Dalma Gálfi
Preceded by (Japan) Naomi Osaka	WTA Newcomer of the Year; 2017	Succeeded by (Belarus) Aryna Sabalenka
