= 2017 WTA 125K series =

Details
- Duration: April 17, 2017 – November 26, 2017
- Edition: 6th
- Tournaments: 8

Achievements (singles)
- Most titles: (Switzerland) Belinda Bencic (2)
- Most finals: (Switzerland) Belinda Bencic (2)

The WTA 125K series is the secondary professional tennis circuit organised by the Women's Tennis Association. The 2017 WTA 125K series calendar consisted of eight tournaments, each with a total prize fund of $125,000. After 2016, San Antonio Open folded while two new tournaments were introduced in Zhengzhou and Mumbai. The Hua Hin Championships returned after the previous year's edition was cancelled due to the death of Thai monarch, Bhumibol Adulyadej.

== Schedule ==
Week of	Tournament	Champions	Runners-up	Semifinalists	Quarterfinalists
April 17	Zhengzhou Women's Tennis Open; Zhengzhou, China $125,000 – hard – 32S/16Q/16D; Singles – Doubles	(China) Wang Qiang; 3–6, 7–6^{(7–3)}, 1–1 ret.	(China) Peng Shuai	(China) Zheng Saisai (China) Duan Yingying	(Kazakhstan) Zarina Diyas (Japan) Nao Hibino (South Korea) Jang Su-jeong (China) Liu Fangzhou
April 17	Zhengzhou Women's Tennis Open; Zhengzhou, China $125,000 – hard – 32S/16Q/16D; Singles – Doubles	(China) Han Xinyun (China) Zhu Lin; 7–5, 6–1	(United States) Jacqueline Cako (Israel) Julia Glushko	(China) Zheng Saisai (China) Duan Yingying	(Kazakhstan) Zarina Diyas (Japan) Nao Hibino (South Korea) Jang Su-jeong (China) Liu Fangzhou
June 5	Bol Open; Bol, Croatia $125,000 – clay – 32S/8Q/12D; Singles – Doubles	(Serbia) Aleksandra Krunić; 6–3, 3–0 ret.	(Romania) Alexandra Cadanțu	(Brazil) Beatriz Haddad Maia (Luxembourg) Mandy Minella	(Italy) Sara Errani (Serbia) Ivana Jorović (Greece) Maria Sakkari (Ukraine) Kateryna Bondarenko
June 5	Bol Open; Bol, Croatia $125,000 – clay – 32S/8Q/12D; Singles – Doubles	(Chinese Taipei) Chuang Chia-jung (Czech Republic) Renata Voráčová; 6–4, 6–2	(North Macedonia) Lina Gjorcheska (Bulgaria) Aleksandrina Naydenova	(Brazil) Beatriz Haddad Maia (Luxembourg) Mandy Minella	(Italy) Sara Errani (Serbia) Ivana Jorović (Greece) Maria Sakkari (Ukraine) Kateryna Bondarenko
September 4	Dalian Women's Tennis Open; Dalian, China $125,000 – hard – 32S/16Q/16D; Singles – Doubles	(Ukraine) Kateryna Kozlova; 6–4, 6–2	(Russia) Vera Zvonareva	(Kazakhstan) Zarina Diyas (Russia) Vitalia Diatchenko	(China) Duan Yingying (China) Han Xinyun (Uzbekistan) Sabina Sharipova (China) Zhang Kailin
September 4	Dalian Women's Tennis Open; Dalian, China $125,000 – hard – 32S/16Q/16D; Singles – Doubles	(China) Lu Jingjing (China) You Xiaodi; 7–6^{(7–2)}, 4–6, [10–5]	(China) Guo Hanyu (China) Ye Qiuyu	(Kazakhstan) Zarina Diyas (Russia) Vitalia Diatchenko	(China) Duan Yingying (China) Han Xinyun (Uzbekistan) Sabina Sharipova (China) Zhang Kailin
November 6	Hua Hin Championships; Hua Hin, Thailand $125,000 – hard – 32S/16Q/16D; Singles – Doubles	(Switzerland) Belinda Bencic; 6–3, 6–4	(Chinese Taipei) Hsieh Su-wei	(Romania) Ana Bogdan (Switzerland) Viktorija Golubic	(Russia) Vitalia Diatchenko (China) Duan Yingying (Austria) Barbara Haas (Thailand) Luksika Kumkhum
November 6	Hua Hin Championships; Hua Hin, Thailand $125,000 – hard – 32S/16Q/16D; Singles – Doubles	(China) Duan Yingying (China) Wang Yafan; 6–3, 6–3	(Slovenia) Dalila Jakupović (Russia) Irina Khromacheva	(Romania) Ana Bogdan (Switzerland) Viktorija Golubic	(Russia) Vitalia Diatchenko (China) Duan Yingying (Austria) Barbara Haas (Thailand) Luksika Kumkhum
November 6	Open de Limoges; Limoges, France $125,000 – hard (indoor) – 32S/16Q/8D; Singles – Doubles	(Romania) Monica Niculescu; 6–4, 6–2	(Germany) Antonia Lottner	(France) Pauline Parmentier (Germany) Sabine Lisicki	(Russia) Anna Blinkova (Estonia) Kaia Kanepi (Switzerland) Conny Perrin (Russia) Ekaterina Alexandrova
November 6	Open de Limoges; Limoges, France $125,000 – hard (indoor) – 32S/16Q/8D; Singles – Doubles	(Russia) Valeria Savinykh (Belgium) Maryna Zanevska; 6–0, 6–2	(France) Chloé Paquet (France) Pauline Parmentier	(France) Pauline Parmentier (Germany) Sabine Lisicki	(Russia) Anna Blinkova (Estonia) Kaia Kanepi (Switzerland) Conny Perrin (Russia) Ekaterina Alexandrova
November 13	OEC Taipei WTA Challenger; Taipei, Taiwan $125,000 – carpet (indoor) – 32S/16Q/16D; Singles – Doubles	(Switzerland) Belinda Bencic; 7–6^{(7–3)}, 6–1	(Netherlands) Arantxa Rus	(Switzerland) Viktorija Golubic (United Kingdom) Naomi Broady	(Thailand) Luksika Kumkhum (Switzerland) Jil Teichmann (Russia) Veronika Kudermetova (Australia) Lizette Cabrera
November 13	OEC Taipei WTA Challenger; Taipei, Taiwan $125,000 – carpet (indoor) – 32S/16Q/16D; Singles – Doubles	(Russia) Veronika Kudermetova (Belarus) Aryna Sabalenka; 2–6, 7–6^{(7–5)}, [10–6]	(Australia) Monique Adamczak (United Kingdom) Naomi Broady	(Switzerland) Viktorija Golubic (United Kingdom) Naomi Broady	(Thailand) Luksika Kumkhum (Switzerland) Jil Teichmann (Russia) Veronika Kudermetova (Australia) Lizette Cabrera
November 20	Hawaii Tennis Open; Honolulu, United States $125,000 – hard – 32S/8Q/16D; Singles – Doubles	(China) Zhang Shuai; 0–6, 6–2, 6–3	(South Korea) Jang Su-jeong	(Sweden) Rebecca Peterson (United States) Julia Boserup	(Russia) Vitalia Diatchenko (Croatia) Ajla Tomljanović (Russia) Evgeniya Rodina (Japan) Miharu Imanishi
November 20	Hawaii Tennis Open; Honolulu, United States $125,000 – hard – 32S/8Q/16D; Singles – Doubles	(Chinese Taipei) Hsieh Shu-ying (Chinese Taipei) Hsieh Su-wei; 6–1, 7–6^{(7–3)}	(Japan) Eri Hozumi (United States) Asia Muhammad	(Sweden) Rebecca Peterson (United States) Julia Boserup	(Russia) Vitalia Diatchenko (Croatia) Ajla Tomljanović (Russia) Evgeniya Rodina (Japan) Miharu Imanishi
November 20	Mumbai Open; Mumbai, India $125,000 – hard – 32S/16Q/16D; Singles – Doubles	(Belarus) Aryna Sabalenka; 6–2, 6–3	(Slovenia) Dalila Jakupović	(France) Amandine Hesse (Uzbekistan) Sabina Sharipova	(United Kingdom) Naomi Broady (India) Ankita Raina (Belgium) Yanina Wickmayer (France) Alizé Lim
November 20	Mumbai Open; Mumbai, India $125,000 – hard – 32S/16Q/16D; Singles – Doubles	(Mexico) Victoria Rodríguez (Netherlands) Bibiane Schoofs; 7–5, 3–6, [10–7]	(Slovenia) Dalila Jakupović (Russia) Irina Khromacheva	(France) Amandine Hesse (Uzbekistan) Sabina Sharipova	(United Kingdom) Naomi Broady (India) Ankita Raina (Belgium) Yanina Wickmayer (France) Alizé Lim

== Statistical information ==
These tables present the number of singles (S) and doubles (D) titles won by each player and each nation during the season. The players/nations are sorted by: 1) total number of titles (a doubles title won by two players representing the same nation counts as only one win for the nation); 2) a singles > doubles hierarchy; 3) alphabetical order (by family names for players).

To avoid confusion and double counting, these tables should be updated only after an event is completed.

=== Titles won by player ===
Total	Player	S	D	S	D
2	Belinda Bencic (SUI)	● ●		2	0
2	Aryna Sabalenka (BLR)	●	●	1	1
1	Kateryna Kozlova (UKR)	●		1	0
1	Aleksandra Krunić (SRB)	●		1	0
1	Monica Niculescu (ROU)	●		1	0
1	Wang Qiang (CHN)	●		1	0
1	Zhang Shuai (CHN)	●		1	0
1	Chuang Chia-jung (TPE)		●	0	1
1	Duan Yingying (CHN)		●	0	1
1	Han Xinyun (CHN)		●	0	1
1	Hsieh Shu-ying (TPE)		●	0	1
1	Hsieh Su-wei (TPE)		●	0	1
1	Veronika Kudermetova (RUS)		●	0	1
1	Lu Jingjing (CHN)		●	0	1
1	Victoria Rodríguez (MEX)		●	0	1
1	Valeria Savinykh (RUS)		●	0	1
1	Bibiane Schoofs (NED)		●	0	1
1	Renata Voráčová (CZE)		●	0	1
1	Wang Yafan (CHN)		●	0	1
1	You Xiaodi (CHN)		●	0	1
1	Maryna Zanevska (BEL)		●	0	1
1	Zhu Lin (CHN)		●	0	1

=== Titles won by nation ===
Total	Nation	S	D
5	China (CHN)	2	3
2	Switzerland (SUI)	2	0
2	Belarus (BLR)	1	1
2	Chinese Taipei (TPE)	0	2
2	Russia (RUS)	0	2
1	Romania (ROU)	1	0
1	Serbia (SRB)	1	0
1	Ukraine (UKR)	1	0
1	Belgium (BEL)	0	1
1	Czech Republic (CZE)	0	1
1	Mexico (MEX)	0	1
1	Netherlands (NED)	0	1

== Points distribution ==
Event	W	F	SF	QF	R16	R32	Q	Q2	Q1
Singles	160	95	57	29	15	1	6	4	1
Doubles (16D)	160	95	57	29	1	—	—	—	—
