= 2017 Hua Hin Championships – Men's doubles =

Men's doubles
- 2017 Hua Hin Championships

Final
- Champions: (Thailand) Sanchai Ratiwatana (Thailand) Sonchat Ratiwatana
- Runners-up: (United States) Austin Krajicek (United States) Jackson Withrow
- Score: 6–4, 5–7, [10–5]

Events
Singles	men	women
Doubles	men	women
- Hua Hin Championships

Lee Hsin-han and Lu Yen-hsun were the defending champions but chose not to defend their title.

Sanchai and Sonchat Ratiwatana won the title after defeating Austin Krajicek and Jackson Withrow 6–4, 5–7, [10–5] in the final.

== Seeds ==
1. (Australia) Alex Bolt / (Australia) Bradley Mousley (semifinals)
2. (Japan) Ben McLachlan / (Japan) Yasutaka Uchiyama (first round)
3. (Thailand) Sanchai Ratiwatana / (Thailand) Sonchat Ratiwatana (champions)
4. (United States) Austin Krajicek / (United States) Jackson Withrow (final)

== Draw ==
Key

- Q = Qualifier
- WC = Wild card
- LL = Lucky loser
- Alt = Alternate
- ITF = ITF entry
- PR = Protected ranking
- SR = Special ranking
- SE = Special exempt
- JE = Junior exempt
- JR = Junior Accelerator Programme entrant
- CO = College Accelerator Programme entrant
- NG = Next Gen Accelerator Program entrant
- w/o = Walkover
- r = Retired
- d = Defaulted

First round
1	(Australia) A Bolt (Australia) B Mousley	6	7^{7}
(Australia) D Kelly (Australia) A Whittington	2	6^{4}
(Serbia) N Milojević (Serbia) D Petrović	6	6
WC	(Thailand) K Kerdlaphee (Thailand) P Kerdlaphee	1	2
3	(Thailand) Sa Ratiwatana (Thailand) So Ratiwatana	6	6
(Australia) M Purcell (Australia) A Santillan	4	4
(United States) J Cerretani (Japan) T Matsui	6^{1}	6^{5}
(Canada) P Polansky (New Zealand) R Statham	7^{7}	7^{7}
(Australia) M Banes (Russia) A Vatutin	4	6^{3}
WC	(Thailand) Patcharapol Kawin (Thailand) J Navasirisomboon	6	7^{7}
WC	(Thailand) P Isaro (Thailand) W Trongcharoenchaikul	4	6^{4}
4	(United States) A Krajicek (United States) J Withrow	6	7^{7}
(Philippines) R Gonzales (Chinese Taipei) H-y Peng	4	2
(Australia) J Millman (France) S Robert	6	6
(South Korea) S-w Kwon (Israel) E Leshem	4	6	[10]
2	(Japan) B McLachlan (Japan) Y Uchiyama	6	1	[8]

Quarterfinals
1	(Australia) A Bolt (Australia) B Mousley	6	6
(Serbia) N Milojević (Serbia) D Petrović	4	4
3	(Thailand) Sa Ratiwatana (Thailand) So Ratiwatana	7^{7}	6
(Canada) P Polansky (New Zealand) R Statham	6^{4}	3
WC	(Thailand) P Kawin (Thailand) J Navasirisomboon	6	3	[7]
4	(United States) A Krajicek (United States) J Withrow	2	6	[10]
(Australia) J Millman (France) S Robert	6	6
(South Korea) S-w Kwon (Israel) E Leshem	4	4

Semifinals
1	(Australia) A Bolt (Australia) B Mousley	4	6^{4}
3	(Thailand) Sa Ratiwatana (Thailand) So Ratiwatana	6	7^{7}
4	(United States) A Krajicek (United States) J Withrow	4	6	[10]
(Australia) J Millman (France) S Robert	6	3	[2]

Final
3	(Thailand) Sa Ratiwatana (Thailand) So Ratiwatana	6	5	[10]
4	(United States) A Krajicek (United States) J Withrow	4	7	[5]
