= 2015 Dalian Women's Tennis Open =

- Date: 8–13 September
- Edition: 1st
- Category: WTA 125K series
- Draw: 32S/16Q/16D
- Prize money: $125,000
- Surface: Hard
- Location: Dalian, China

Champions

Singles
- (China) Zheng Saisai

Doubles
- (China) Zhang Kailin / (China) Zheng Saisai
| Dalian Women's Tennis Open | · 2016 → |

The 2015 Dalian Women's Tennis Open was a professional tennis tournament played on hard courts. It was the first tournament in the 2015 WTA 125K series and took place in Dalian, China, from 8 to 13 September 2015.

== Singles draw entrants ==
=== Seeds ===
| Country | Player | Rank^{1} | Seed |
|---|---|---|---|
| CHN | Zheng Saisai | 71 | 1 |
| SRB | Bojana Jovanovski | 98 | 2 |
| CHN | Duan Yingying | 103 | 3 |
| RUS | Elizaveta Kulichkova | 107 | 4 |
| CHN | Wang Qiang | 112 | 5 |
| CZE | Kristýna Plíšková | 113 | 6 |
| JPN | Nao Hibino | 123 | 7 |
| CHN | Zhu Lin | 125 | 8 |

- ^{1} Rankings are as of 31 August 2015.

=== Other entrants ===
The following players received wildcards into the singles main draw:

- (China) Lu Jiajing
- (China) Xu Shilin
- (China) Zhang Shuai
- (China) Zhang Yuxuan

The following players received entry from the qualifying draw:

- (China) Liu Chang
- (China) Lu Jingjing
- (Poland) Katarzyna Piter
- (United Kingdom) Emily Webley-Smith

== Doubles draw entrants ==
=== Seeds ===
| Country | Player | Country | Player | Rank^{1} | Seed |
|---|---|---|---|---|---|
| TPE | Chan Chin-wei | CRO | Darija Jurak | 136 | 1 |
| CHN | Zhang Kailin | CHN | Zheng Saisai | 166 | 2 |
| JPN | Shuko Aoyama | JPN | Makoto Ninomiya | 205 | 3 |
| TPE | Chang Kai-chen | CHN | Han Xinyun | 226 | 4 |

- ^{1} Rankings are as of 31 August 2015.

=== Other entrants ===
The following players received wildcards into the singles main draw:

- (China) Li Yixuan / (China) Sun Xuliu

== Champions ==
=== Singles ===
- (China) Zheng Saisai def. (Israel) Julia Glushko, 2–6, 6–1, 7–5

=== Doubles ===
- (China) Zhang Kailin / (China) Zheng Saisai def. (Chinese Taipei) Chan Chin-wei / (Croatia) Darija Jurak, 6–3, 6–4
