= 2017 Dalian Women's Tennis Open =

- Date: 5-10 September
- Edition: 3rd
- Category: WTA 125K series
- Draw: 32S/16Q/16D
- Prize money: $125,000
- Surface: Hard
- Location: Dalian, China

Champions

Singles
- (Ukraine) Kateryna Kozlova

Doubles
- (China) Lu Jingjing / (China) You Xiaodi
← 2016 ·	Dalian Women's Tennis Open	· 2018 →

The 2017 Dalian Women's Tennis Open was a professional tennis tournament played on hard courts. It was the third edition of the tournament which was part of the 2017 WTA 125K series and took place in Dalian, China, from 5 to 10 September 2017.

== Singles draw entrants ==
=== Seeds ===
Country	Player	Rank^{1}	Seed
CHN	Duan Yingying	92	1
MNE	Danka Kovinić	106	2
KAZ	Zarina Diyas	109	3
TPE	Chang Kai-chen	113	4
UKR	Kateryna Kozlova	118	5
CHN	Han Xinyun	124	6
~~BEL~~	~~Yanina Wickmayer~~	~~129~~	~~7~~
CRO	Jana Fett	131	8
AUS	Arina Rodionova	134	9

- ^{1} Rankings are as of 28 August 2017.

=== Other entrants ===
The following players received wildcards into the singles main draw:

- (China) Lu Jiajing
- (China) Yuan Yue
- (China) Zhang Kailin
- (China) Zheng Wushuang

The following players received entry using protected rankings:

- (Russia) Vitalia Diatchenko
- (Sweden) Rebecca Peterson
- (Russia) Vera Zvonareva

The following players received entry from the qualifying draw:

- (Indonesia) Beatrice Gumulya
- (China) Wang Meiling
- (China) You Xiaodi
- (China) Zhang Yuxuan

The following players received entry as a lucky loser:

- (Japan) Hiroko Kuwata
- (Japan) Erika Sema

==== Withdrawals ====
Before the tournament

- (Romania) Ana Bogdan →replaced by (Japan) Riko Sawayanagi
- (Brazil) Beatriz Haddad Maia →replaced by (United States) Danielle Collins
- (Japan) Nao Hibino →replaced by (South Korea) Jang Su-jeong
- (Chinese Taipei) Hsieh Su-wei →replaced by (Thailand) Peangtarn Plipuech
- (Serbia) Aleksandra Krunić →replaced by (China) Gao Xinyu
- (United States) Christina McHale →replaced by (Croatia) Jana Fett
- (Japan) Risa Ozaki →replaced by (Slovenia) Dalila Jakupović
- (Russia) Evgeniya Rodina →replaced by (Uzbekistan) Sabina Sharipova
- (China) Wang Yafan →replaced by (Japan) Erika Sema
- (Belgium) Yanina Wickmayer →replaced by (Japan) Hiroko Kuwata
- (China) Zheng Saisai →replaced by (China) Liu Fangzhou
- (China) Zhu Lin →replaced by (China) Lu Jingjing

== Doubles draw entrants ==
=== Seeds ===
Country	Player	Country	Player	Rank^{1}	Seed
AUS	Monique Adamczak	AUS	Storm Sanders	169	1
CHN	Han Xinyun	AUS	Jessica Moore	191	2
SLO	Dalila Jakupović	MNE	Danka Kovinić	211	3
CHN	Jiang Xinyu	CHN	Lu Jiajing	259	4

- ^{1} Rankings are as of 28 August 2017.

== Champions ==
=== Singles ===
- (Ukraine) Kateryna Kozlova def. (Russia) Vera Zvonareva, 6–4, 6–2

=== Doubles ===
- (China) Lu Jingjing / (China) You Xiaodi def. (China) Guo Hanyu / (China) Ye Qiuyu, 7–6^{(7–2)}, 4–6, [10–5]
