= 2016 Dalian Women's Tennis Open =

- Date: 6–11 September
- Edition: 2nd
- Category: WTA 125K series
- Draw: 32S/16Q/16D
- Prize money: $125,000
- Surface: Hard
- Location: Dalian, China

Champions

Singles
- (Czech Republic) Kristýna Plíšková

Doubles
- (Chinese Taipei) Lee Ya-hsuan / (Japan) Kotomi Takahata
← 2015 ·	Dalian Women's Tennis Open	· 2017 →

The 2016 Dalian Women's Tennis Open was a professional tennis tournament played on hard courts. It was the first edition of the tournament which was part of the 2016 WTA 125K series and took place in Dalian, China, from 6 to 11 September 2016.

== Singles draw entrants ==
=== Seeds ===
Country	Player	Rank^{1}	Seed
CHN	Wang Qiang	62	1
~~TPE~~	~~Hsieh Su-wei~~	~~79~~	~~2~~
CHN	Duan Yingying	103	3
AUT	Tamira Paszek	104	4
CHN	Zhang Kailin	108	5
SVK	Jana Čepelová	117	6
JPN	Misa Eguchi	119	7
GER	Tatjana Maria	121	8

- ^{1} Rankings are as of 29 August 2016.

=== Other entrants ===
The following players received wildcards into the singles main draw:

- (China) Lu Jiajing
- (China) Peng Shuai
- (China) Tang Haochen
- (China) Yang Zhaoxuan

The following players received entry from the qualifying draw:

- (Chinese Taipei) Chang Kai-chen
- (China) Lu Jingjing
- (Thailand) Peangtarn Plipuech
- (China) You Xiaodi

The following player received entry by a lucky loser spot:

- (South Korea) Han Na-lae

== Doubles draw entrants ==
=== Seeds ===
Country	Player	Country	Player	Rank^{1}	Seed
USA	Nicole Melichar	POL	Alicja Rosolska	141	1
GER	Tatjana Maria	TUR	İpek Soylu	172	2
CHN	Han Xinyun	CHN	Zhang Kailin	175	3
CHN	Lu Jingjing	CHN	Yang Zhaoxuan	207	4

- ^{1} Rankings are as of 16 August 2016.

=== Other entrants ===
The following players received wildcards into the singles main draw:

- (Serbia) Aleksandra Krunić / (China) Li Yuenu

== Champions ==
=== Singles ===
- (Czech Republic) Kristýna Plíšková def. (Japan) Misa Eguchi, 7–5, 4–6, 2–5 ret.

=== Doubles ===
- (Chinese Taipei) Lee Ya-hsuan / (Japan) Kotomi Takahata def. (Thailand) Nicha Lertpitaksinchai / (Indonesia) Jessy Rompies, 6–2, 6–1
