= 2016 Dalian Women's Tennis Open – Singles =

Singles
- 2016 Dalian Women's Tennis Open

Final
- Champion: (Czech Republic) Kristýna Plíšková
- Runner-up: (Japan) Misa Eguchi
- Score: 7–5, 4–6, 2–5 ret.

Events
Singles	Doubles
← 2015 ·	Dalian Women's Tennis Open	· 2017 →

Zheng Saisai was the defending champion, but chose not to participate.

Kristýna Plíšková won the title after her opponent Misa Eguchi retired in the third set with the score at 7–5, 4–6, 2–5^{r}.

== Seeds ==
1. (China) Wang Qiang (quarterfinals)
2. (Chinese Taipei) Hsieh Su-wei (withdrew)
3. (China) Duan Yingying (second round)
4. (Austria) Tamira Paszek (second round)
5. (China) Zhang Kailin (first round, retired)
6. (Slovakia) Jana Čepelová (second round)
7. (Japan) Misa Eguchi (final, retired)
8. (Germany) Tatjana Maria (first round)

== Main draw ==
=== Key ===
- Q = Qualifier
- WC = Wild card
- LL = Lucky loser
- Alt = Alternate
- SE = Special exempt
- PR = Protected ranking
- ITF = ITF entry
- JE = Junior exempt
- w/o = Walkover
- r = Retired
- d = Defaulted
- SR = Special ranking

=== Finals ===
Semifinals
(United States) Grace Min	4	7^{7}	3
7	(Japan) Misa Eguchi	6	6^{4}	6
(China) Han Xinyun	1^{r}
(Czech Republic) Kristýna Plíšková	4

Final
7	(Japan) Misa Eguchi	5	6	5^{r}
(Czech Republic) Kristýna Plíšková	7	4	2

=== Top half ===
First round
1	(China) Q Wang	6	7^{7}
(Uzbekistan) N Abduraimova	4	6^{4}
LL	(South Korea) N-l Han	6	3	6
WC	(China) Z Yang	4	6	2
(United States) G Min	2	6	6
(China) L Zhu	6	3	3
WC	(China) S Peng	4	6	4
6	(Slovakia) J Čepelová	6	2	6
5	(China) K Zhang	2	6	1^{r}
(Israel) J Glushko	6	4	4
Q	(Thailand) Pe Plipuech	6	6
WC	(China) H Tang	1	1
(Russia) A Pivovarova	7^{8}	6
(Japan) H Kuwata	6^{6}	2
Q	(China) Jin Lu	3	5
7	(Japan) M Eguchi	6	7

Second round
1	(China) Q Wang	6	1	6
LL	(South Korea) N-l Han	3	6	1
(United States) G Min	6	6
6	(Slovakia) J Čepelová	4	3
(Israel) J Glushko	4	6	6
Q	(Thailand) Pe Plipuech	6	3	2
(Russia) A Pivovarova	3	4
7	(Japan) M Eguchi	6	6

Quarterfinals
1	(China) Q Wang	7	2	3
(United States) G Min	5	6	6
(Israel) J Glushko	2	0
7	(Japan) M Eguchi	6	6

Semifinals
(United States) G Min	4	7^{7}	3
7	(Japan) M Eguchi	6	6^{4}	6

=== Bottom half ===
First round
8	(Germany) T Maria	4	4
(China) X Han	6	6
(Turkey) İ Soylu	6	6
(Thailand) L Kumkhum	4	1
(United States) J Brady	6	4	1
(China) Y Wang	1	6	6
Q	(China) X You	5	7	1
4	(Austria) T Paszek	7	5	6
(Czech Republic) Kr Plíšková	2	6	7^{7}
Q	(Chinese Taipei) K-c Chang	6	4	6^{5}
(Sweden) R Peterson	7^{7}	6
(China) F Liu	6^{2}	4
WC	(China) Jia Lu	1	2
(Serbia) A Krunić	6	6
(Spain) S Sorribes Tormo	3	5
3	(China) Y Duan	6	7

Second round
(China) X Han	6	6
(Turkey) İ Soylu	4	1
(China) Y Wang	6	7^{7}
4	(Austria) T Paszek	2	6^{2}
(Czech Republic) Kr Plíšková	6	6
(Sweden) R Peterson	4	4
(Serbia) A Krunić	6	3	6
3	(China) Y Duan	2	6	1

Quarterfinals
(China) X Han	0	7	6
(China) Y Wang	6	5	4
(Czech Republic) Kr Plíšková	6	6
(Serbia) A Krunić	2	4

Semifinals
(China) X Han	1^{r}
(Czech Republic) Kr Plíšková	4
