= 2017 OEC Taipei WTA Challenger =

- Date: 13–19 November
- Edition: 10th
- Category: WTA 125K series
- Prize money: $115,000
- Surface: Carpet (indoor)
- Location: Taipei, Taiwan

Champions

Singles
- (Switzerland) Belinda Bencic

Doubles
- (Russia) Veronika Kudermetova / (Belarus) Aryna Sabalenka
← 2016 ·	OEC Taipei WTA Challenger	· 2018 →

The 2017 OEC Taipei WTA Challenger is a professional tennis tournament to be played on indoor carpet courts. It will be the 10th edition of the tournament and part of the 2017 WTA 125K series, offering a total of $115,000 in prize money. It will take place in Taipei, Taiwan, on 13–19 November 2017.

== Singles main draw entrants ==
=== Seeds ===
Country	Player	Rank^{1}	Seed
BLR	Aryna Sabalenka	78	1
RUS	Evgeniya Rodina	83	2
CHN	Duan Yingying	95	3
CHN	Zhu Lin	104	4
BEL	Yanina Wickmayer	112	5
JPN	Risa Ozaki	114	6
ROU	Ana Bogdan	115	7
AUS	Arina Rodionova	117	8

- ^{1} Rankings as of 6 November 2017.

=== Other entrants ===
The following player received a wildcard into the singles main draw:

- (Switzerland) Belinda Bencic
- (Chinese Taipei) Hsu Ching-wen
- (Chinese Taipei) Lee Ya-hsuan
- (Hong Kong) Zhang Ling

The following players received entry from the qualifying draw:

- (Russia) Vitalia Diatchenko
- (Australia) Priscilla Hon
- (Slovenia) Dalila Jakupović
- (Russia) Veronika Kudermetova

== Doubles entrants ==
=== Seeds ===
Country	Player	Country	Player	Rank^{1}	Seed
JPN	Eri Hozumi	JPN	Makoto Ninomiya	89	1
AUS	Arina Rodionova	SRB	Nina Stojanović	145	2
AUS	Monique Adamczak	GBR	Naomi Broady	147	3
SLO	Dalila Jakupović	RUS	Irina Khromacheva	169	4

- ^{1} Rankings as of 6 November 2017.

=== Other entrants ===
The following pair received a wildcard into the doubles main draw:

- (Chinese Taipei) Chan Chin-wei / (Chinese Taipei) Liang En-shuo

== Champions ==
=== Singles ===
- (Switzerland) Belinda Bencic def. (Netherlands) Arantxa Rus 7–6^{(7–3)}, 6–1

=== Doubles ===
- (Russia) Veronika Kudermetova / (Belarus) Aryna Sabalenka def. (Australia) Monique Adamczak / (United Kingdom) Naomi Broady 2–6, 7–6^{(7–5)}, [10-6]
