= 2016 Dalian Women's Tennis Open – Doubles =

Doubles
- 2016 Dalian Women's Tennis Open

Final
- Champions: (Chinese Taipei) Lee Ya-hsuan (Japan) Kotomi Takahata
- Runners-up: (Thailand) Nicha Lertpitaksinchai (Indonesia) Jessy Rompies
- Score: 6–2, 6–1

Events
Singles	Doubles
← 2015 ·	Dalian Women's Tennis Open	· 2017 →

Zhang Kailin and Zheng Saisai were the defending champions, however Zheng chose not to participate. Zhang was scheduled to partner Han Xinyun, but withdrew before the tournament began, after retiring in her first round singles match due to injury.

Lee Ya-hsuan and Kotomi Takahata won the title after defeating Nicha Lertpitaksinchai and Jessy Rompies 6–2, 6–1 in the final.

== Seeds ==
1. (United States) Nicole Melichar / (Poland) Alicja Rosolska (quarterfinals)
2. (Germany) Tatjana Maria / (Turkey) İpek Soylu (first round)
3. (China) Han Xinyun / (China) Zhang Kailin (withdrew)
4. (China) Lu Jingjing / (China) Yang Zhaoxuan (first round)

== Draw ==
=== Key ===
- Q = Qualifier
- WC = Wild card
- LL = Lucky loser
- Alt = Alternate
- SE = Special exempt
- PR = Protected ranking
- ITF = ITF entry
- JE = Junior exempt
- w/o = Walkover
- r = Retired
- d = Defaulted
- SR = Special ranking

First round
1	(United States) N Melichar (Poland) A Rosolska	6	7^{7}
(Japan) M Eguchi (Japan) H Kuwata	4	6^{2}
(Thailand) N Lertpitaksinchai (Indonesia) J Rompies	6	6
(United Kingdom) J Rae (United Kingdom) A Smith	3	4
Alt	(India) A Raina (Spain) S Sorribes Tormo
(Japan) A Omae (Thailand) Pe Plipuech	w/o
(Chinese Taipei) C-w Chan (United Kingdom) E Webley-Smith	7^{7}	6
(Australia) J Moore (Bulgaria) A Naydenova	6^{2}	3
(China) Y Xou (China) L Zhu	4	2
(Chinese Taipei) K-c Chang (China) Y Wang	6	6
(Uzbekistan) N Abduraimova (Belarus) L Marozava	7^{13}	6
4	(China) J Lu (China) Z Yang	6^{11}	1
(Chinese Taipei) Y-h Lee (Japan) K Takahata	7^{9}	6
(Israel) J Glushko (Austria) T Paszek	6^{7}	2
WC	(Serbia) A Krunić (China) Y Li	6	0	[11]
2	(Germany) T Maria (Turkey) İ Soylu	2	6	[9]

Quarterfinals
1	(United States) N Melichar (Poland) A Rosolska	3	2
(Thailand) N Lertpitaksinchai (Indonesia) J Rompies	6	6
(Japan) A Omae (Thailand) Pe Plipuech	5	6	[10]
(Chinese Taipei) C-w Chan (United Kingdom) E Webley-Smith	7	0	[6]
(Chinese Taipei) K-c Chang (China) Y Wang	5	2
(Uzbekistan) N Abduraimova (Belarus) L Marozava	7	6
(Chinese Taipei) Y-h Lee (Japan) K Takahata	6	6
WC	(Serbia) A Krunić (China) Y Li	3	4

Semifinals
(Thailand) N Lertpitaksinchai (Indonesia) J Rompies	6	6
(Japan) A Omae (Thailand) Pe Plipuech	3	4
(Uzbekistan) N Abduraimova (Belarus) L Marozava	3	2
(Chinese Taipei) Y-h Lee (Japan) K Takahata	6	6

Final
(Thailand) N Lertpitaksinchai (Indonesia) J Rompies	2	1
(Chinese Taipei) Y-h Lee (Japan) K Takahata	6	6
