= 2017 Hua Hin Championships =

- Date: 20–26 November (ATP); 6 – 12 November (WTA)
- Edition: 2nd
- Draw: 32S / 16D
- Prize money: $125,000
- Surface: Hard, outdoor
- Location: Hua Hin, Thailand

Champions

Men's singles
- (Australia) John Millman

Women's singles
- (Switzerland) Belinda Bencic

Men's doubles
- (Thailand) Sanchai Ratiwatana / (Thailand) Sonchat Ratiwatana

Women's doubles
- (China) Duan Yingying / (China) Wang Yafan
- Hua Hin Championships

The 2017 Hua Hin Championships was a professional tennis tournament played on outdoor hard courts. It was the 2nd edition of the tournament, which was part of the 2017 ATP Challenger Tour and part of 2017 WTA 125K series. It took place in Hua Hin, Thailand from 6 November to 12 November 2017 for the women's tournament, and from 20 November to 26 November 2017 for the men's tournament.

== Men's singles main-draw entrants ==
=== Seeds ===
| Country | Player | Rank^{1} | Seed |
|---|---|---|---|
| AUS | Matthew Ebden | 98 | 1 |
| CAN | Peter Polansky | 138 | 2 |
| AUS | Akira Santillan | 144 | 3 |
| JPN | Tatsuma Ito | 149 | 4 |
| SRB | Nikola Milojević | 161 | 5 |
| JPN | Go Soeda | 165 | 6 |
| KOR | Kwon Soon-woo | 172 | 7 |
| AUS | John Millman | 179 | 8 |

- ^{1} Rankings as of 13 November 2017.

=== Other entrants ===
The following players received wildcards into the singles main draw:

- (Thailand) Congsup Congcar
- (Thailand) Pruchya Isaro
- (Thailand) Jirat Navasirisomboon
- (Thailand) Wishaya Trongcharoenchaikul

The following player received entry into the singles main draw as a special exempt:

- (Poland) Hubert Hurkacz

The following players received entry from the qualifying draw:

- (Australia) Marinko Matosevic
- (Japan) Hiroki Moriya
- (France) Stéphane Robert
- (Germany) Tobias Simon

== WTA singles main-draw entrants ==
=== Seeds ===
| Country | Player | Rank^{1} | Seed |
|---|---|---|---|
| CHN | Wang Qiang | 46 | 1 |
| RUS | Evgeniya Rodina | 83 | 2 |
| CHN | Duan Yingying | 95 | 3 |
| TPE | Hsieh Su-wei | 96 | 4 |
| BEL | Yanina Wickmayer | 112 | 5 |
| ROU | Ana Bogdan | 113 | 6 |
| JPN | Misaki Doi | 119 | 7 |
| GBR | Naomi Broady | 120 | 8 |

- ^{1} Rankings are as of 30 October 2017.

=== Other entrants ===
The following players received wildcards into the singles main draw:

- (Thailand) Chompoothip Jandakate
- (Thailand) Peangtarn Plipuech
- (China) Wang Qiang
- (Thailand) Yanin Wisitwarapron
- (Thailand) Varatchaya Wongteanchai

The following players received entry from the qualifying draw:

- (United States) Emina Bektas
- (Russia) Veronika Kudermetova
- (Mexico) Giuliana Olmos
- (Hungary) Fanny Stollár

== WTA doubles main-draw entrants ==
=== Seeds ===
| Country | Player | Country | Player | Rank^{1} | Seed |
|---|---|---|---|---|---|
| RUS | Veronika Kudermetova | TUR | İpek Soylu | 141 | 1 |
| AUS | Monique Adamczak | GBR | Naomi Broady | 146 | 2 |
| SLO | Dalila Jakupović | RUS | Irina Khromacheva | 169 | 3 |
| USA | Desirae Krawczyk | MEX | Giuliana Olmos | 235 | 4 |

- ^{1} Rankings as of 30 October 2017.

=== Other entrants ===
The following team received wildcards into the doubles main draw:

- (Thailand) Chompoothip Jandakate / (Thailand) Tamachan Momkoonthod

== Champions ==
=== Men's singles ===
- (Australia) John Millman def. (Australia) Andrew Whittington 6–2, 6–2.

=== Men's doubles ===
- (Thailand) Sanchai Ratiwatana / (Thailand) Sonchat Ratiwatana def. (United States) Austin Krajicek / (United States) Jackson Withrow 6–4, 5–7, [10–5].

=== Women's singles ===
- (Switzerland) Belinda Bencic def. (Chinese Taipei) Hsieh Su-wei, 6–3, 6–4

=== Women's doubles ===
- (China) Duan Yingying / (China) Wang Yafan def. (Slovenia) Dalila Jakupović / (Russia) Irina Khromacheva, 6–3, 6–3
