= 2015 Dalian Women's Tennis Open – Singles =

Singles
- 2015 Dalian Women's Tennis Open

Final
- Champion: (China) Zheng Saisai
- Runner-up: (Israel) Julia Glushko
- Score: 2–6, 6–1, 7–5

Events
Singles	Doubles
← 2014 ·	Dalian Women's Tennis Open	· 2016 →

This was a new event to the WTA 125K series.

Top seed Zheng Saisai won the title, defeating Julia Glushko in the final 2–6, 6–1, 7–5.

== Seeds ==
1. (China) Zheng Saisai (champion)
2. (Serbia) Bojana Jovanovski (second round)
3. (China) Duan Yingying (first round)
4. (Russia) Elizaveta Kulichkova (first round)
5. (China) Wang Qiang (semifinals)
6. (Czech Republic) Kristýna Plíšková (first round)
7. (Japan) Nao Hibino (second round)
8. (China) Zhu Lin (second round)

== Main draw ==
=== Key ===
- Q = Qualifier
- WC = Wild card
- LL = Lucky loser
- Alt = Alternate
- SE = Special exempt
- PR = Protected ranking
- ITF = ITF entry
- JE = Junior exempt
- w/o = Walkover
- r = Retired
- d = Defaulted
- SR = Special ranking

=== Finals ===
Semifinals
1	(China) Zheng Saisai	7^{7}	6
5	(China) Wang Qiang	6^{4}	2
(Israel) Julia Glushko	6	6
(Croatia) Petra Martić	1	4

Final
1	(China) Zheng Saisai	2	6	7
(Israel) Julia Glushko	6	1	5

=== Top half ===
First round
1	(China) S Zheng	6	6
(China) K Zhang	3	3
Q	(Poland) K Piter	0	3
(China) Z Yang	6	6
Q	(United Kingdom) E Webley-Smith	1	6^{5}
(Chinese Taipei) K-c Chang	6	7
Q	(China) C Liu	6	4	6^{7}
7	(Japan) N Hibino	1	6	7^{9}
4	(Russia) E Kulichkova	2	3
(China) F Liu	6	6
(China) X Han	4	7	7^{7}
(Japan) E Hozumi	6	5	6^{4}
WC	(China) S Zhang	4	3
(Thailand) L Kumkhum	6	6
Q	(China) Jin Lu	3	4
5	(China) Q Wang	6	6

Second round
1	(China) S Zheng	6	6
(China) Z Yang	4	1
(Chinese Taipei) K-c Chang	6	6
7	(Japan) N Hibino	3	2
(China) F Liu	6	6
(China) X Han	2	1
(Thailand) L Kumkhum	1	1
5	(China) Q Wang	6	6

Quarterfinals
1	(China) S Zheng	5	6	6
(Chinese Taipei) K-c Chang	7	3	1
(China) F Liu	1	3
5	(China) Q Wang	6	6

Semifinals
1	(China) S Zheng	7^{7}	6
5	(China) Q Wang	6^{4}	2

=== Bottom half ===
First round
8	(China) L Zhu	6	7
(Japan) M Eguchi	0	5
(Japan) R Sawayanagi	2	3
(Israel) J Glushko	6	6
WC	(China) Y Zhang	6	6
(Switzerland) S Vögele	1	3
(Spain) S Sorribes Tormo	3	6	6
3	(China) Y Duan	6	4	2
6	(Czech Republic) Kr Plíšková	2	4
WC	(China) Jia Lu	6	6
(Croatia) P Martić	5	6	6
(Japan) R Ozaki	7	4	0
(China) Y Wang	6	6
(China) Y Xu	1	2
WC	(China) S Xu	4	6	1
2	(Serbia) B Jovanovski	6	2	6

Second round
8	(China) L Zhu	1	3
(Israel) J Glushko	6	6
WC	(China) Y Zhang	1	2
(Spain) S Sorribes Tormo	6	6
WC	(China) Jia Lu	4	3
(Croatia) P Martić	6	6
(China) Y Wang	6	6
2	(Serbia) B Jovanovski	2	0

Quarterfinals
(Israel) J Glushko	7^{7}	6
(Spain) S Sorribes Tormo	6^{3}	3
(Croatia) P Martić	7^{7}	5	7^{8}
(China) Y Wang	6^{3}	7	6^{6}

Semifinals
(Israel) J Glushko	6	6
(Croatia) P Martić	1	4
