= 2017 Hua Hin Championships – Men's singles =

Men's singles
- 2017 Hua Hin Championships

Final
- Champion: (Australia) John Millman
- Runner-up: (Australia) Andrew Whittington
- Score: 6–2, 6–2

Events
Singles	men	women
Doubles	men	women
- Hua Hin Championships

Yūichi Sugita was the defending champion but chose not to defend his title.

John Millman won the title after defeating Andrew Whittington 6–2, 6–2 in the final.

== Seeds ==
1. (Australia) Matthew Ebden (quarterfinals)
2. (Canada) Peter Polansky (first round)
3. (Australia) Akira Santillan (second round, retired)
4. (Japan) Tatsuma Ito (semifinals)
5. (Serbia) Nikola Milojević (second round, retired)
6. (Japan) Go Soeda (semifinals)
7. (South Korea) Kwon Soon-woo (quarterfinals)
8. (Australia) John Millman (champion)

== Draw ==
Key

- Q = Qualifier
- WC = Wild card
- LL = Lucky loser
- Alt = Alternate
- ITF = ITF entry
- PR = Protected ranking
- SR = Special ranking
- SE = Special exempt
- JE = Junior exempt
- JR = Junior Accelerator Programme entrant
- CO = College Accelerator Programme entrant
- NG = Next Gen Accelerator Program entrant
- w/o = Walkover
- r = Retired
- d = Defaulted

=== Finals ===
Semifinals
6	(Japan) Go Soeda	3	3
(Australia) Andrew Whittington	6	6
4	(Japan) Tatsuma Ito	6^{2}	2
8	(Australia) John Millman	7^{7}	6

Final
(Australia) Andrew Whittington	2	2
8	(Australia) John Millman	6	6

=== Top half ===
First round
1	(Australia) M Ebden	2	6	6
WC	(Thailand) P Isaro	6	3	1
Q	(Australia) M Matosevic	7^{7}	6
(Japan) Y Takahashi	6^{5}	4
WC	(Thailand) J Navasirisomboon	1	2
(United States) A Krajicek	6	6
(Australia) D Kelly	6	3	2
6	(Japan) G Soeda	4	6	6
3	(Australia) A Santillan	6	6
WC	(Thailand) Congsup Congcar	2	2
(Israel) E Leshem	6	6
(Russia) T Gabashvili	3	4
(Australia) A Whittington	7^{7}	6
(Australia) A Bolt	6^{3}	4
Q	(Japan) H Moriya	3	1
5	(Serbia) N Milojević	6	6

Second round
1	(Australia) M Ebden	6	6
Q	(Australia) M Matosevic	3	2
(United States) A Krajicek	6	1	2
6	(Japan) G Soeda	4	6	6
3	(Australia) A Santillan	3^{r}
(Israel) E Leshem	5
(Australia) A Whittington	4	6	1
5	(Serbia) N Milojević	6	1	0^{r}

Quarterfinals
1	(Australia) M Ebden	4	5
6	(Japan) G Soeda	6	7
(Israel) E Leshem	6	4	3
(Australia) A Whittington	1	6	6

Semifinals
6	(Japan) G Soeda	3	3
(Australia) A Whittington	6	6

=== Bottom half ===
First round
7	(South Korea) S-w Kwon	7^{7}	6
WC	(Thailand) W Trongcharoenchaikul	6^{2}	2
(Serbia) D Petrović	6^{3}	3
(New Zealand) R Statham	7^{7}	6
(Australia) O Jasika	3	2
(Australia) M Banes	6	6
(Australia) B Mousley	6^{4}	6^{6}
4	(Japan) T Ito	7^{7}	7^{8}
8	(Australia) J Millman	6	6
SE	(Poland) H Hurkacz	4	3
(Australia) M Purcell	7^{12}	6
Q	(Germany) Tobias Simon	6^{10}	3
(Russia) A Vatutin	6	6^{2}	6
(Japan) Y Uchiyama	3	7^{7}	4
Q	(France) S Robert	4	7^{7}	6
2	(Canada) P Polansky	6	6^{1}	4

Second round
7	(South Korea) S-w Kwon	6	6
(New Zealand) R Statham	2	4
(Australia) M Banes	1	6^{2}
4	(Japan) T Ito	6	7^{7}
8	(Australia) J Millman	4
(Australia) M Purcell	0^{r}
(Russia) A Vatutin	6	6
Q	(France) S Robert	2	3

Quarterfinals
7	(South Korea) S-w Kwon	6	4	4
4	(Japan) T Ito	1	6	6
8	(Australia) J Millman	6	6
(Russia) A Vatutin	2	0

Semifinals
4	(Japan) T Ito	6^{2}	2
8	(Australia) J Millman	7^{7}	6
