= 2017 Bol Open =

- Date: 6–11 June
- Edition: 12th
- Category: WTA 125K series
- Draw: 32S / 16D
- Prize money: $125,000
- Surface: Clay
- Location: Bol, Croatia
- Venue: Bluesun Tennis Center Zlatni rat

Champions

Singles
- (Serbia) Aleksandra Krunić

Doubles
- (Chinese Taipei) Chuang Chia-jung / (Czech Republic) Renata Voráčová
- Bol Open

The 2017 Bol Open was a professional tennis tournament played on outdoor clay courts in Bol, Croatia. It was the 12th edition of the tournament and part of the 2017 WTA 125K series. The event took place on 6 to 11 June 2017. Aleksandra Krunić won the singles champion, while Chuang Chia-jung and Renata Voráčová claimed the doubles championship.

== Singles entrants ==
=== Seeds ===
Country	Player	Rank^{1}	Seed
SWE	Johanna Larsson	59	1
LUX	Mandy Minella	70	2
RUS	Natalia Vikhlyantseva	74	3
ESP	Sara Sorribes Tormo	84	4
ITA	Sara Errani	91	5
UKR	Kateryna Bondarenko	92	6
SVK	Kristína Kučová	95	7
GRE	Maria Sakkari	99	8

- ^{1} Rankings as of 29 May 2017.

=== Other entrants ===
The following players received wildcards into the singles main draw:

- (Italy) Sara Errani
- (Croatia) Tena Lukas
- (Croatia) Ajla Tomljanović
- (Russia) Natalia Vikhlyantseva

The following players received entry from the qualifying draw:

- (Croatia) Ana Biškić
- (Chinese Taipei) Chuang Chia-jung
- (Switzerland) Xenia Knoll
- (India) Prarthana Thombare

=== Withdrawals ===
Before the tournament

- (United States) Catherine Bellis →replaced by (Bulgaria) Viktoriya Tomova
- (Romania) Ana Bogdan →replaced by (Czech Republic) Renata Voráčová
- (Slovakia) Jana Čepelová →replaced by (Croatia) Tereza Mrdeža
- (Romania) Sorana Cîrstea →replaced by (Bulgaria) Elitsa Kostova
- (Tunisia) Ons Jabeur →replaced by (Serbia) Ivana Jorović
- (Russia) Irina Khromacheva →replaced by (Japan) Misa Eguchi
- (United States) Varvara Lepchenko →replaced by (Slovenia) Tamara Zidanšek
- (Poland) Magda Linette →replaced by (Spain) Olga Sáez Larra
- (Croatia) Petra Martić →replaced by (Russia) Alexandra Panova
- (United States) Christina McHale →replaced by (Belarus) Olga Govortsova
- (Romania) Patricia Maria Țig →replaced by (North Macedonia) Lina Gjorcheska
- (China) Zheng Saisai →replaced by (Romania) Alexandra Cadanțu

== Doubles entrants ==
=== Seeds ===
Country	Player	Country	Player	Rank^{1}	Seed
TPE	Chuang Chia-jung	CZE	Renata Voráčová	134	1
SUI	Xenia Knoll	BEL	Maryna Zanevska	189	2
MKD	Lina Gjorcheska	BUL	Aleksandrina Naydenova	262	3
ROU	Alexandra Cadanțu	IND	Prarthana Thombare	280	4

- ^{1} Rankings as of May 29, 2017 .

=== Other entrants ===
The following pairs received a wildcard into the doubles main draw:

- (Croatia) Ana Biškić / (Croatia) Ani Mijačika

== Champions ==
=== Singles ===
- (Serbia) Aleksandra Krunić def. (Romania) Alexandra Cadanțu, 6–3, 3–0 ret.

=== Doubles ===
- (Chinese Taipei) Chuang Chia-jung / (Czech Republic) Renata Voráčová def. (North Macedonia) Lina Gjorcheska / (Bulgaria) Aleksandrina Naydenova, 6–4, 6–2
