= 2017 Mumbai Open =

- Date: 20–26 November 2017
- Edition: 1st
- Draw: 32S / 16D
- Prize money: $125,000
- Surface: Hard
- Location: Mumbai, India
- Venue: Cricket Club of India

Champions

Singles
- (Belarus) Aryna Sabalenka

Doubles
- (Mexico) Victoria Rodríguez / (Netherlands) Bibiane Schoofs
- Mumbai Open

The 2017 L&T Mumbai Open was a professional tennis tournament played on outdoor hard courts. It was the first edition of the tournament overall, but the first in Mumbai, as the event made its debut in Pune in 2012 but was discontinued thereafter. It is part of the 2017 WTA 125K series. It took place between 20 November and 26 November 2017.

== WTA singles main-draw entrants ==
=== Seeds ===
Country	Player	Rank^{1}	Seed
BLR	Aryna Sabalenka	79	1
ROU	Ana Bogdan	111	2
BEL	Yanina Wickmayer	113	3
AUS	Arina Rodionova	117	4
GBR	Naomi Broady	122	5
AUS	Lizette Cabrera	139	6
CAN	Carol Zhao	150	7
RUS	Irina Khromacheva	162	8

- ^{1} Rankings are as of 13 November 2017.

=== Other entrants ===
The following players received wildcards into the singles main draw:

- (India) Rutuja Bhosale
- (India) Zeel Desai
- (India) Ankita Raina
- (India) Karman Thandi

The following players received entry from the qualifying draw:

- (Romania) Ana Bogdan
- (Israel) Deniz Khazaniuk
- (Japan) Hiroko Kuwata
- (France) Alizé Lim

==== Withdrawals ====
Before the tournament

- (Czech Republic) Petra Krejsová →replaced by (France) Amandine Hesse
- (Italy) Jasmine Paolini →replaced by (Japan) Junri Namigata
- (Slovakia) Anna Karolína Schmiedlová →replaced by (Russia) Veronika Kudermetova
- (Turkey) İpek Soylu →replaced by (United Kingdom) Laura Robson
- (China) Zhu Lin →replaced by (Ukraine) Olga Ianchuk
- (Russia) Vera Zvonareva →replaced by (Thailand) Peangtarn Plipuech

== WTA doubles main-draw entrants ==
=== Seeds ===
Country	Player	Country	Player	Rank^{1}	Seed
GEO	Oksana Kalashnikova	RUS	Veronika Kudermetova	129	1
SLO	Dalila Jakupović	RUS	Irina Khromacheva	161	2
SWE	Cornelia Lister	AUS	Arina Rodionova	193	3
ISR	Julia Glushko	AUS	Priscilla Hon	286	4

- ^{1} Rankings as of 13 November 2017.

=== Other entrants ===
The following team received wildcards into the doubles main draw:

- (India) Riya Bhatia / (India) Natasha Palha

== Champions ==
=== Singles ===
- (Belarus) Aryna Sabalenka def. (Slovenia) Dalila Jakupović, 6–2, 6–3

=== Doubles ===
- (Mexico) Victoria Rodríguez / (Netherlands) Bibiane Schoofs def. (Slovenia) Dalila Jakupović / (Russia) Irina Khromacheva 7–5, 3–6, [10–7]
