= 2015 Dalian Women's Tennis Open – Doubles =

Doubles
- 2015 Dalian Women's Tennis Open

Final
- Champions: (China) Zhang Kailin (China) Zheng Saisai
- Runners-up: (Chinese Taipei) Chan Chin-wei (Croatia) Darija Jurak
- Score: 6–3, 6–4

Events
Singles	Doubles
← 2014 ·	Dalian Women's Tennis Open	· 2016 →

This was a new event to the WTA 125K series.

Zhang Kailin and Zheng Saisai won the title, defeating Chan Chin-wei and Darija Jurak in the final, 6–3, 6–4.

== Seeds ==
1. (Chinese Taipei) Chan Chin-wei / (Croatia) Darija Jurak (final)
2. (China) Zhang Kailin / (China) Zheng Saisai (champions)
3. (Japan) Shuko Aoyama / (Japan) Makoto Ninomiya (first round)
4. (Chinese Taipei) Chang Kai-chen / (China) Han Xinyun (semifinals)

== Draw ==
=== Key ===
- Q = Qualifier
- WC = Wild card
- LL = Lucky loser
- Alt = Alternate
- SE = Special exempt
- PR = Protected ranking
- ITF = ITF entry
- JE = Junior exempt
- w/o = Walkover
- r = Retired
- d = Defaulted
- SR = Special ranking

First round
1	(Chinese Taipei) C-w Chan (Croatia) D Jurak	6	6
(China) C Liu (China) Jia Lu	1	1
WC	(China) Y Li (China) X Sun	1	6	[10]
(Thailand) N Lertpitaksinchai (Thailand) P Plipuech	6	2	[5]
4	(Chinese Taipei) K-c Chang (China) X Han	7	6
(Japan) E Sema (Japan) Y Sema	5	2
(Serbia) B Jovanovski (India) A Raina	6	4	[7]
(Japan) N Hibino (United Kingdom) E Webley-Smith	3	6	[10]
(Japan) H Kuwata (Hong Kong) L Zhang	2	4
(Japan) E Hozumi (Japan) M Kato	6	6
(China) R Tian (China) Y Wang	7^{7}	1	[10]
3	(Japan) S Aoyama (Japan) M Ninomiya	6^{5}	6	[7]
(China) Z Yang (China) L Zhu	2	6	[10]
(Israel) J Glushko (United States) N Melichar	6	3	[6]
(Japan) M Eguchi (Japan) R Sawayanagi	6	5	[8]
2	(China) K Zhang (China) S Zheng	3	7	[10]

Quarterfinals
1	(Chinese Taipei) C-w Chan (Croatia) D Jurak	6	6
WC	(China) Y Li (China) X Sun	4	1
4	(Chinese Taipei) K-c Chang (China) X Han	6	6
(Japan) N Hibino (United Kingdom) E Webley-Smith	2	0
(Japan) E Hozumi (Japan) M Kato	6	4	[7]
(China) R Tian (China) Y Wang	4	6	[10]
(China) Z Yang (China) L Zhu	5	6^{3}
2	(China) K Zhang (China) S Zheng	7	7^{7}

Semifinals
1	(Chinese Taipei) C-w Chan (Croatia) D Jurak	7	7^{1}
4	(Chinese Taipei) K-c Chang (China) X Han	5	6^{1}
(China) R Tian (China) Y Wang
2	(China) K Zhang (China) S Zheng	w/o

Final
1	(Chinese Taipei) C-w Chan (Croatia) D Jurak	3	4
2	(China) K Zhang (China) S Zheng	6	6
