= 2017 Bol Open – Doubles =

Doubles
- 2017 Bol Open

Final
- Champion: (Chinese Taipei) Chuang Chia-jung (Czech Republic) Renata Voráčová
- Runner-up: (North Macedonia) Lina Gjorcheska (Bulgaria) Aleksandrina Naydenova
- Score: 6–4, 6–2

Events
Singles	Doubles
← 2016 ·	Bol Open	· 2018 →

Xenia Knoll and Petra Martić were the defending champions, but Martić chose not to participate. Knoll played alongside Maryna Zanevska, but they lost to Maria Sakkari and Sara Sorribes Tormo in the quarterfinals.

Chuang Chia-jung and Renata Voráčová won the title, defeating Lina Gjorcheska and Aleksandrina Naydenova in the final, 6–4, 6–2.

== Seeds ==
1. (Chinese Taipei) Chuang Chia-jung / (Czech Republic) Renata Voráčová (champions)
2. (Switzerland) Xenia Knoll / (Belgium) Maryna Zanevska (quarterfinals)
3. (North Macedonia) Lina Gjorcheska / (Bulgaria) Aleksandrina Naydenova (final)
4. (Romania) Alexandra Cadanțu / (India) Prarthana Thombare (quarterfinals, withdrew)

== Draw ==
=== Key ===
- Q = Qualifier
- WC = Wild card
- LL = Lucky loser
- Alt = Alternate
- ITF = ITF entry
- PR = Protected ranking
- SR = Special ranking
- SE = Special exempt
- JE = Junior exempt
- JR = Junior Accelerator Programme entrant
- CO = College Accelerator Programme entrant
- NG = Next Gen Accelerator Program entrant
- w/o = Walkover
- r = Retired
- d = Defaulted

First round
(Japan) M Eguchi (Italy) Giulia Pairone	6	7^{13}
(Czech Republic) K Kramperová (Netherlands) R van der Hoek	1	6^{11}
4	(Romania) A Cadanțu (India) P Thombare	6	3	[10]
(Belarus) O Govortsova (Russia) A Panova	1	6	[8]
(Croatia) T Mrdeža (Slovenia) T Zidanšek	6	6
(Slovakia) K Kučová (Croatia) T Lukas	4	3
(Bulgaria) V Tomova (Croatia) Marijana Vlahinić	2	1
(Serbia) I Jorović (Bulgaria) E Kostova	6	6
WC	(Croatia) A Biškić (Croatia) A Mijačika	4	1
3	(North Macedonia) L Gjorcheska (Bulgaria) A Naydenova	6	6
(Greece) M Sakkari (Spain) S Sorribes Tormo	6	6
(Poland) K Kawa (Bosnia and Herzegovina) J Tinjić	3	4

Quarterfinals
1	(Chinese Taipei) C-j Chuang (Czech Republic) R Voráčová	6	6
(Japan) M Eguchi (Italy) G Pairone	4	4
4	(Romania) A Cadanțu (India) P Thombare
(Croatia) T Mrdeža (Slovenia) T Zidanšek	w/o
(Serbia) I Jorović (Bulgaria) E Kostova	2	4
3	(North Macedonia) L Gjorcheska (Bulgaria) A Naydenova	6	6
(Greece) M Sakkari (Spain) S Sorribes Tormo	6	6
2	(Switzerland) X Knoll (Belgium) M Zanevska	4	3

Semifinals
1	(Chinese Taipei) C-j Chuang (Czech Republic) R Voráčová	4	7	[11]
(Croatia) T Mrdeža (Slovenia) T Zidanšek	6	5	[9]
3	(North Macedonia) L Gjorcheska (Bulgaria) A Naydenova	6	6
(Greece) M Sakkari (Spain) S Sorribes Tormo	3	4

Final
1	(Chinese Taipei) C-j Chuang (Czech Republic) R Voráčová	6	6
3	(North Macedonia) L Gjorcheska (Bulgaria) A Naydenova	4	2
