= 2017 OEC Taipei WTA Challenger – Singles =

Singles
- 2017 OEC Taipei WTA Challenger

Final
- Champion: (Switzerland) Belinda Bencic
- Runner-up: (Netherlands) Arantxa Rus
- Score: 7–6^{(7–3)}, 6–1

Events
Singles	Doubles
- OEC Taipei WTA Challenger

Evgeniya Rodina was the defending champion, but lost in the first round to Eri Hozumi.

Belinda Bencic won the title defeating Arantxa Rus 7–6^{(7–3)}, 6–1 in the final.

== Seeds ==
1. (Belarus) Aryna Sabalenka (second round)
2. (Russia) Evgeniya Rodina (first round)
3. (China) Duan Yingying (first round)
4. (China) Zhu Lin (first round)
5. (Belgium) Yanina Wickmayer (first round)
6. (Japan) Risa Ozaki (second round)
7. (Romania) Ana Bogdan (first round)
8. (Australia) Arina Rodionova (first round)

== Main draw ==
Key

- Q = Qualifier
- WC = Wild card
- LL = Lucky loser
- Alt = Alternate
- ITF = ITF entry
- PR = Protected ranking
- SR = Special ranking
- SE = Special exempt
- JE = Junior exempt
- JR = Junior Accelerator Programme entrant
- CO = College Accelerator Programme entrant
- NG = Next Gen Accelerator Program entrant
- w/o = Walkover
- r = Retired
- d = Defaulted

=== Finals ===
Semifinals
(Switzerland) Viktorija Golubic	2	4
WC	(Switzerland) Belinda Bencic	6	6
(United Kingdom) Naomi Broady	3	6	3
(Netherlands) Arantxa Rus	6	4	6

Final
WC	(Switzerland) Belinda Bencic	7^{7}	6
(Netherlands) Arantxa Rus	6^{3}	1

=== Top half ===
First round
1	(Belarus) A Sabalenka	7^{7}	1	6
(Japan) M Doi	6^{5}	6	3
(Switzerland) V Golubic	6	7
WC	(Chinese Taipei) Y-h Lee	2	5
(Czech Republic) M Bouzková	6	7
WC	(Hong Kong) L Zhang	3	5
(Thailand) L Kumkhum	2	7^{11}	7
7	(Romania) A Bogdan	6	6^{9}	5
3	(China) Y Duan	6^{4}	4
WC	(Switzerland) B Bencic	7^{7}	6
(Russia) I Khromacheva	3	6	0
Q	(Australia) P Hon	6	3	6
(Switzerland) J Teichmann	6	6
WC	(Chinese Taipei) C-w Hsu	3	1
Q	(Slovenia) D Jakupović	7^{7}	2	4
6	(Japan) R Ozaki	6^{4}	6	6

Second round
1	(Belarus) A Sabalenka	5	3
(Switzerland) V Golubic	7	6
(Czech Republic) M Bouzková	4	3
(Thailand) L Kumkhum	6	6
WC	(Switzerland) B Bencic	7^{7}	6
Q	(Australia) P Hon	6^{5}	2
(Switzerland) J Teichmann	6	6
6	(Japan) R Ozaki	4	2

Quarterfinals
(Switzerland) V Golubic	7^{7}	4	6
(Thailand) L Kumkhum	6^{1}	6	3
WC	(Switzerland) B Bencic	6	7
(Switzerland) J Teichmann	4	5

Semifinals
(Switzerland) V Golubic	2	4
WC	(Switzerland) B Bencic	6	6

=== Bottom half ===
First round
8	(Australia) Ar Rodionova	2	7^{7}	2
(South Korea) S-j Jang	6	6^{1}	6
(United Kingdom) N Broady	6^{4}	6	6
(China) Y Wang	7^{7}	2	3
(China) Jin Lu	2	2
Q	(Russia) V Kudermetova	6	6
(Poland) M Fręch	6	7
4	(China) L Zhu	4	5
5	(Belgium) Y Wickmayer	2	3
Q	(Russia) V Diatchenko	6	6
(Netherlands) A Rus	7^{7}	7
(Turkey) İ Soylu	6^{4}	5
(Australia) L Cabrera	3	7	6
(Italy) S Errani	6	5	2
(Japan) E Hozumi	7^{7}	6
2	(Russia) E Rodina	6^{2}	2

Second round
(South Korea) S-j Jang	6	1	5
(United Kingdom) N Broady	4	6	7
Q	(Russia) V Kudermetova	1	6	6
(Poland) M Fręch	6	3	4
Q	(Russia) V Diatchenko	6	5	4
(Netherlands) A Rus	1	7	6
(Australia) L Cabrera	6	7
(Japan) E Hozumi	2	5

Quarterfinals
(United Kingdom) N Broady	6	6
Q	(Russia) V Kudermetova	2	3
(Netherlands) A Rus	6	6
(Australia) L Cabrera	1	0

Semifinals
(United Kingdom) N Broady	3	6	3
(Netherlands) A Rus	6	4	6

== Qualifying ==
=== Seeds ===
1. (United States) Jacqueline Cako (qualifying competition)
2. (Russia) Vitalia Diatchenko (qualified)
3. (Uzbekistan) Sabina Sharipova (qualifying competition)
4. (China) Zhang Kailin (first round)
5. (Canada) Carol Zhao (first round)
6. (Australia) Priscilla Hon (qualified)
7. (Serbia) Nina Stojanović (qualifying competition)
8. (Slovenia) Dalila Jakupović (qualified)

=== Qualifiers ===
1. (Australia) Priscilla Hon
2. (Russia) Vitalia Diatchenko
3. (Slovenia) Dalila Jakupović
4. (Russia) Veronika Kudermetova

=== Qualifying draw ===
==== First qualifier ====
First round
1	(United States) Jacqueline Cako	3	6	6
(Japan) Hiroko Kuwata	6	2	3
WC	(Hong Kong) Ng Kwan-yau	2	3
6	(Australia) Priscilla Hon	6	6

Qualifying competition
1	(United States) Jacqueline Cako	4	4
6	(Australia) Priscilla Hon	6	6

==== Second qualifier ====
First round
2	(Russia) Vitalia Diatchenko	6	6
(Germany) Vivian Heisen	3	2
(South Korea) Han Na-lae	6^{3}	3
7	(Serbia) Nina Stojanović	7^{7}	6

Qualifying competition
2	(Russia) Vitalia Diatchenko	0	6	6
7	(Serbia) Nina Stojanović	6	2	4

==== Third qualifier ====
First round
3	(Uzbekistan) Sabina Sharipova	6	7^{7}
(Hungary) Fanny Stollár	1	6^{2}
(Mexico) Victoria Rodríguez	2	3
8	(Slovenia) Dalila Jakupović	6	6

Qualifying competition
3	(Uzbekistan) Sabina Sharipova	3	1
8	(Slovenia) Dalila Jakupović	6	6

==== Fourth qualifier ====
First round
4	(China) Zhang Kailin	6^{2}	5
(Russia) Veronika Kudermetova	7^{7}	7
WC	(United States) Ingrid Neel	6^{7}	7^{8}	6
5	(Canada) Carol Zhao	7^{9}	6^{6}	2

Qualifying competition
(Russia) Veronika Kudermetova	7^{7}	6
WC	(United States) Ingrid Neel	6^{3}	2
