= 2017 Mumbai Open – Singles =

Singles
- 2017 Mumbai Open

Final
- Champion: (Belarus) Aryna Sabalenka
- Runner-up: (Slovenia) Dalila Jakupović
- Score: 6–2, 6–3

Events
Singles	Doubles
← 2012 ·	Mumbai Open	· 2018 →

Elina Svitolina was the defending champion from the last time the event was held at Pune in 2012, but chose not to participate this year.

Aryna Sabalenka won the title, defeating Dalila Jakupović in the final, 6–2, 6–3.

== Seeds ==
1. (Belarus) Aryna Sabalenka (champion)
2. (Romania) Ana Bogdan (second round)
3. (Belgium) Yanina Wickmayer (quarterfinals)
4. (Australia) Arina Rodionova (first round)
5. (United Kingdom) Naomi Broady (quarterfinals)
6. (Australia) Lizette Cabrera (first round)
7. (Canada) Carol Zhao (second round)
8. (Russia) Irina Khromacheva (first round)

== Draw ==
=== Key ===
- Q = Qualifier
- WC = Wild card
- LL = Lucky loser
- Alt = Alternate
- SE = Special exempt
- PR = Protected ranking
- ITF = ITF entry
- JE = Junior exempt
- w/o = Walkover
- r = Retired
- d = Defaulted
- SR = Special ranking

=== Finals ===
Semifinals
1	(Belarus) Aryna Sabalenka	6	6
(France) Amandine Hesse	2	3
(Uzbekistan) Sabina Sharipova	6	3	3
(Slovenia) Dalila Jakupović	3	6	6

Final
1	(Belarus) Aryna Sabalenka	6	6
(Slovenia) Dalila Jakupović	2	3

=== Top half ===
First round
1	(Belarus) A Sabalenka	7	6
(Australia) P Hon	5	1
(Hungary) D Gálfi	2	2
(China) Jia Lu	6	6
(Japan) J Namigata	6	5
(Ukraine) O Ianchuk	1	4^{r}
(Netherlands) B Schoofs	2	6	2
5	(United Kingdom) N Broady	6	0	6
4	(Australia) Ar Rodionova	6^{2}	3
(France) A Hesse	7^{7}	6
Q	(Israel) D Khazaniuk	6	6
WC	(India) R Bhosale	4	3
WC	(India) A Raina	7^{7}	6
(Russia) V Kudermetova	6^{2}	3
(Thailand) P Plipuech	7^{7}	6
6	(Australia) L Cabrera	6^{4}	2

Second round
1	(Belarus) A Sabalenka	6^{5}	6	7^{7}
(China) Jia Lu	7^{7}	2	6^{4}
(Japan) J Namigata	2	2
5	(United Kingdom) N Broady	6	6
(France) A Hesse	6	4	6
Q	(Israel) D Khazaniuk	3	6	1
WC	(India) A Raina	6	6
(Thailand) P Plipuech	2	2

Quarterfinals
1	(Belarus) A Sabalenka	6	6
5	(United Kingdom) N Broady	4	2
(France) A Hesse	6	7^{7}
WC	(India) A Raina	3	6^{4}

Semifinals
1	(Belarus) A Sabalenka	6	6
(France) A Hesse	2	3

=== Bottom half ===
First round
8	(Russia) I Khromacheva	6	6^{2}	6^{3}
(Uzbekistan) S Sharipova	2	7^{7}	7^{7}
Q	(Japan) H Kuwata	4	3
(Hungary) F Stollár	6	6
(Czech Republic) M Bouzková	3	3
(Russia) V Ivakhnenko	6	6
(United Kingdom) L Robson	5	4
3	(Belgium) Y Wickmayer	7	6
7	(Canada) C Zhao	6	6
WC	(India) Z Desai	3	1
WC	(India) K Thandi	2	4
(Slovenia) D Jakupović	6	6
(Japan) M Hibi	1	1
Q	(France) A Lim	6	6
(Mexico) V Rodríguez	1	1
2/Q	(Romania) A Bogdan	6	6

Second round
(Uzbekistan) S Sharipova	3
(Hungary) F Stollár	0^{r}
(Russia) V Ivakhnenko	1	4
3	(Belgium) Y Wickmayer	6	6
7	(Canada) C Zhao	3	4
(Slovenia) D Jakupović	6	6
Q	(France) A Lim	7^{7}	2
2/Q	(Romania) A Bogdan	6^{5}	0^{r}

Quarterfinals
(Uzbekistan) S Sharipova	3	6	6
3	(Belgium) Y Wickmayer	6	4	2
(Slovenia) D Jakupović	6	6
Q	(France) A Lim	3	1

Semifinals
(Uzbekistan) S Sharipova	6	3	3
(Slovenia) D Jakupović	3	6	6

== Qualifying ==
=== Seeds ===
1. (Romania) Ana Bogdan (qualified)
2. (Israel) Deniz Khazaniuk (qualified)
3. (Japan) Hiroko Kuwata (qualified)
4. (Israel) Julia Glushko (qualifying competition)
5. (France) Alizé Lim (qualified)
6. (Hong Kong) Zhang Ling (qualifying competition)
7. (Russia) Anna Morgina (qualifying competition)
8. (Australia) Naiktha Bains (qualifying competition)

=== Qualifiers ===
1. (Romania) Ana Bogdan
2. (Israel) Deniz Khazaniuk
3. (Japan) Hiroko Kuwata
4. (France) Alizé Lim

=== Qualifying draw ===
==== First qualifier ====
Semifinals
1/WC	(Romania) Ana Bogdan	6	6
WC	(India) Pranjala Yadlapalli	0	0
(Sweden) Cornelia Lister	2	0
8	(Australia) Naiktha Bains	6	6

Final
1/WC	(Romania) Ana Bogdan	6	6
8	(Australia) Naiktha Bains	0	1

==== Second qualifier ====
Semifinals
2	(Israel) Deniz Khazaniuk	6	6
WC	(India) Natasha Palha	1	0
(Georgia (country)) Oksana Kalashnikova	6	1	1
6	(Hong Kong) Zhang Ling	4	6	6

Final
2	(Israel) Deniz Khazaniuk	7	6
6	(Hong Kong) Zhang Ling	5	4

==== Third qualifier ====
Semifinals
3	(Japan) Hiroko Kuwata	6	6
(Japan) Naoko Eto	0	0
(India) Nidhi Chilumula	1	3
7	(Russia) Anna Morgina	6	6

Final
3	(Japan) Hiroko Kuwata	7	6
7	(Russia) Anna Morgina	5	4

==== Fourth qualifier ====
Semifinals
4	(Israel) Julia Glushko	6	6
(Kyrgyzstan) Ksenia Palkina	3	2
(India) Riya Bhatia	3	0
5	(France) Alizé Lim	6	6

Final
4	(Israel) Julia Glushko	0	3
5	(France) Alizé Lim	6	6
