= 2017 Mumbai Open – Doubles =

Doubles
- 2017 Mumbai Open

Final
- Champion: (Mexico) Victoria Rodriguez (Netherlands) Bibiane Schoofs
- Runner-up: (Slovenia) Dalila Jakupović (Russia) Irina Khromacheva
- Score: 7–5, 3–6, [10–7]

Events
Singles	Doubles
← 2012 ·	Mumbai Open	· 2018 →

Nina Bratchikova and Oksana Kalashnikova were the defending champions from the last time the event was held at Pune in 2012, but Bratchikova has been inactive in the sport since 2014. Kalashnikova played alongside Veronika Kudermetova, but lost in the quarterfinals to Beatrice Gumulya and Ana Veselinović.

Victoria Rodriguez & Bibiane Schoofs won the title, defeating Dalila Jakupović & Irina Khromacheva in the final 7–5, 3–6, [10–7].

== Seeds ==
1. (Georgia (country)) Oksana Kalashnikova / (Russia) Veronika Kudermetova (quarterfinals)
2. (Slovenia) Dalila Jakupović / (Russia) Irina Khromacheva (final)
3. (Sweden) Cornelia Lister / (Australia) Arina Rodionova (first round)
4. (Israel) Julia Glushko / (Australia) Priscilla Hon (semifinals)

== Draw ==
=== Key ===
- Q = Qualifier
- WC = Wild card
- LL = Lucky loser
- Alt = Alternate
- SE = Special exempt
- PR = Protected ranking
- ITF = ITF entry
- JE = Junior exempt
- w/o = Walkover
- r = Retired
- d = Defaulted
- SR = Special ranking

First round
1	(Georgia (country)) O Kalashnikova (Russia) V Kudermetova	6	6
WC	(India) R Bhatia (India) N Palha	1	2
(Russia) A Morgina (Canada) C Zhao	7	1	[7]
(Indonesia) B Gumulya (Montenegro) A Veselinović	5	6	[10]
3	(Sweden) C Lister (Australia) Ar Rodionova	2	5
(Netherlands) E Wacanno (Belgium) Y Wickmayer	6	7
(India) R Bhosale (India) A Raina	4	3
(Mexico) V Rodríguez (Netherlands) B Schoofs	6	6
(Japan) J Namigata (Thailand) P Plipuech	6	6
(Russia) V Ivakhnenko (Uzbekistan) S Sharipova	1	4
(Japan) H Kuwata (India) P Thombare	2	3
4	(Israel) J Glushko (Australia) P Hon	6	6
(India) K Thandi (India) P Yadlapalli	6	7
(Australia) N Bains (Hungary) F Stollár	3	5
(Kyrgyzstan) K Palkina (Hong Kong) L Zhang	2	0
2	(Slovenia) D Jakupović (Russia) I Khromacheva	6	6

Quarterfinals
1	(Georgia (country)) O Kalashnikova (Russia) V Kudermetova	0	1
(Indonesia) B Gumulya (Montenegro) A Veselinović	6	6
(Netherlands) E Wacanno (Belgium) Y Wickmayer	4	6^{4}
(Mexico) V Rodríguez (Netherlands) B Schoofs	6	7^{7}
(Japan) J Namigata (Thailand) P Plipuech	6^{5}	3
4	(Israel) J Glushko (Australia) P Hon	7^{7}	6
(India) K Thandi (India) P Yadlapalli	4	2
2	(Slovenia) D Jakupović (Russia) I Khromacheva	6	6

Semifinals
(Indonesia) B Gumulya (Montenegro) A Veselinović	6^{2}	4
(Mexico) V Rodríguez (Netherlands) B Schoofs	7^{7}	6
4	(Israel) J Glushko (Australia) P Hon	3	2
2	(Slovenia) D Jakupović (Russia) I Khromacheva	6	6

Final
(Mexico) V Rodríguez (Netherlands) B Schoofs	7	3	[10]
2	(Slovenia) D Jakupović (Russia) I Khromacheva	5	6	[7]
