= Kittirat Kerdlaphee =

Thai tennis player

- Country (sports): Thailand
- Born: 11 October 1999 (age 26)
- Plays: Right-handed (two-handed backhand)
- Prize money: $5,648

Singles
- Career record: 0–0 (at ATP Tour level, Grand Slam level, and in Davis Cup)
- Career titles: 0
- Highest ranking: No. 1,350 (13 November 2017)

Doubles
- Career record: 0–1 (at ATP Tour level, Grand Slam level, and in Davis Cup)
- Career titles: 0
- Highest ranking: No. 1,189 (17 December 2018)

Kittirat Kerdlaphee (born 11 October 1999) is a Thai tennis player.

Kerdlaphee has a career high ATP singles ranking of No. 1,350 achieved on 13 November 2017 and a career high ATP doubles ranking of No. 1,189 achieved on 17 December 2018.

Kerdlaphee represents Thailand at the Davis Cup, where he has a W/L record of 0–1.
