= Darija Jurak Schreiber =

Croatian tennis player

Darija Jurak
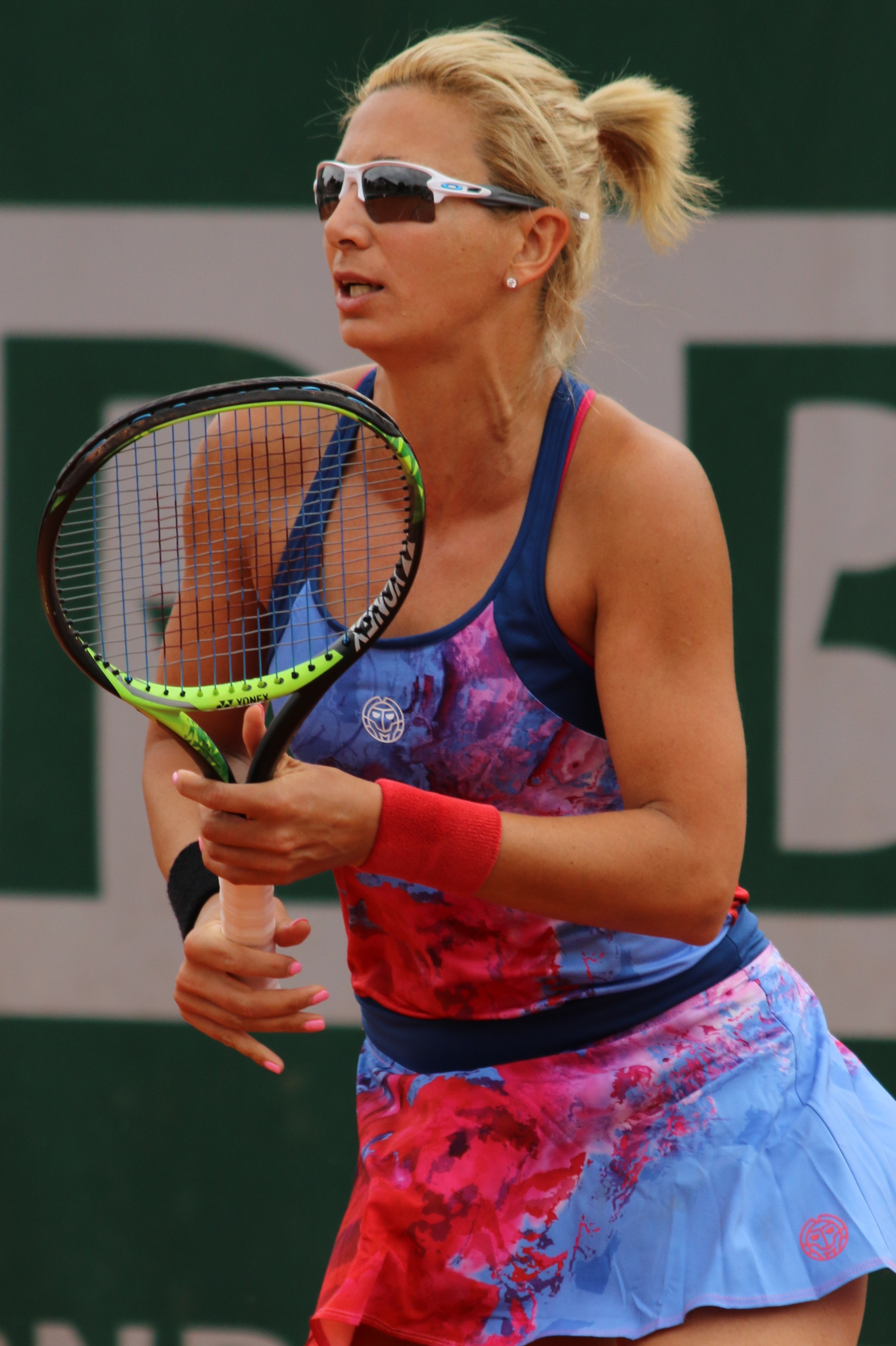
- Jurak at the 2019 French Open
- Full name: Darija Jurak Schreiber
- Country (sports): Croatia
- Residence: Dubai, United Arab Emirates
- Born: 5 April 1984 (age 42) Zagreb, SR Croatia, Yugoslavia
- Height: 1.80 m (5 ft 11 in)
- Turned pro: 2001
- Retired: Sep 2026
- Plays: Right (two-handed backhand)
- Prize money: $1,695,463

Singles
- Career record: 313–254
- Career titles: 0 WTA, 8 ITF
- Highest ranking: No. 188 (5 April 2004)

Doubles
- Career record: 539–439
- Career titles: 9 WTA, 39 ITF
- Highest ranking: No. 9 (15 November 2021)
- Current ranking: No. 960 (22 June 2026)

Grand Slam doubles results
- Australian Open: SF (2021)
- French Open: QF (2021)
- Wimbledon: 3R (2013)
- US Open: 3R (2021)

Other doubles tournaments
- Tour Finals: RR (2021)

Grand Slam mixed doubles results
- Australian Open: 2R (2017)
- French Open: QF (2021)
- Wimbledon: 3R (2021)
- US Open: 1R (2016, 2021)

Other mixed doubles tournaments
- Olympic Games: 1R (2021)
- Last updated on: 28 June 2026.

Darija Jurak;Croatian pronunciation: [dâːrija jûraːk]; born 5 April 1984) is a Croatian former tennis player. Her career-high doubles ranking is world No. 9, achieved on 15 November 2021. Her best WTA ranking in singles is 188 which she reached in April 2004. She qualified with Andreja Klepač for the 2021 WTA Finals, after 20 years on the professional tour.

== World TeamTennis ==
Jurak has played six seasons with World TeamTennis and was part of the 2016 San Diego Aviators team which hoisted the King Cup after winning the WTT Championships. She debuted in 2013 with the Texas Wild returning in 2014. She played her next three seasons with the Aviators from 2015 to 2017. In 2019, Jurak joined the expansion Orlando Storm for their inaugural season.

It was announced that she will rejoining the Storm during the 2020 season set to begin 12 July. Jurak paired with Jessica Pegula throughout the season in women's doubles, helping the Storm earn a No. 3 seed in the WTT Playoffs. The Storm ultimately fell to the Chicago Smash, in the semifinals.

Competing with the Croatia Fed Cup team, she has a win-loss record of 19–8 (as of March 2024).

== WTA Tour doubles title ==
Partnering with Alexa Guarachi, Jurak won the doubles title at the 2021 Dubai Championships, defeating Xu Yifan and Yang Zhaoxuan in the final in straight sets. Alongside Andreja Klepač, she won the 2021 Silicon Valley Classic, with a win over Gabriela Dabrowski and Luisa Stefani in the final. The following week the pair reached the final at the 2021 Canadian Open but saw the roles reversed as they lost to Dabrowski and Stefani.

Jurak came back after four years hiatus in 2026, partnering Katarzyna Piter at the 2026 Abu Dhabi Open.

== WTA 1000 tournaments ==
=== Doubles: 2 (1 title, 1 runner-up) ===
Result	Year	Tournament	Surface	Partner	Opponents	Score
Win	2021	Dubai Championships	Hard	(Chile) Alexa Guarachi	(China) Xu Yifan (China) Yang Zhaoxuan	6–0, 6–3
Loss	2021	Canadian Open, Montreal	Hard	(Slovenia) Andreja Klepač	(Canada) Gabriela Dabrowski (Brazil) Luisa Stefani	3–6, 4–6

== WTA Tour finals ==
=== Doubles: 22 (9 titles, 13 runner-ups) ===
Legend WTA 1000 (1–1) Premier / WTA 500 (3–7) International / WTA 250 (5–5)	Finals by surface Hard (7–8) Grass (2–0) Clay (0–4) Carpet (0–1)

Results	W–L	Date	Tournament	Tier	Surface	Partner	Opponents	Score
Loss	0–1	Jul 2012	Palermo Ladies Open, Italy	International	Clay	(Hungary) Katalin Marosi	(Czech Republic) Renata Voráčová (Czech Republic) Barbora Záhlavová-Strýcová	6–7^{(5–7)}, 4–6
Loss	0–2	May 2013	Estoril Open, Portugal	International	Clay	(Hungary) Katalin Marosi	(Chinese Taipei) Chan Hao-ching (France) Kristina Mladenovic	6–7^{(3–7)}, 2–6
Loss	0–3	Jul 2013	Silicon Valley Classic, United States	Premier	Hard	(Germany) Julia Görges	(United States) Raquel Kops-Jones (United States) Abigail Spears	2–6, 6–7^{(4–7)}
Win	1–3	Apr 2014	Monterrey Open, Mexico	International	Hard	(United States) Megan Moulton-Levy	(Hungary) Tímea Babos (Belarus) Olga Govortsova	7–6^{(7–5)}, 3–6, [11–9]
Loss	1–4	Apr 2015	Charleston Open, United States	Premier	Clay	(Australia) Casey Dellacqua	(Switzerland) Martina Hingis (India) Sania Mirza	0–6, 4–6
Loss	1–5	Oct 2015	Tianjin Open, China	International	Hard	(United States) Nicole Melichar	(China) Xu Yifan (China) Zheng Saisai	2–6, 6–3, [8–10]
Win	2–5	Feb 2016	Dubai Championships, UAE	Premier	Hard	(Chinese Taipei) Chuang Chia-jung	(France) Caroline Garcia (France) Kristina Mladenovic	6–4, 6–4
Win	3–5	Jun 2016	Eastbourne International, UK	Premier	Grass	(Australia) Anastasia Rodionova	(Chinese Taipei) Chan Hao-ching (Chinese Taipei) Chan Yung-jan	5–7, 7–6^{(7–4)}, [10–6]
Loss	3–6	Jul 2016	Silicon Valley Classic, United States	Premier	Hard	(Australia) Anastasia Rodionova	(United States) Raquel Atawo (United States) Abigail Spears	3–6, 4–6
Loss	3–7	Feb 2017	St. Petersburg Trophy, Russia	Premier	Hard (i)	(Switzerland) Xenia Knoll	(Latvia) Jeļena Ostapenko (Poland) Alicja Rosolska	6–3, 2–6, [5–10]
Win	4–7	Mar 2017	Mexican Open, Mexico	International	Hard	(Australia) Anastasia Rodionova	(Paraguay) Verónica Cepede Royg (Colombia) Mariana Duque	6–3, 6–2
Win	5–7	Aug 2018	Washington Open, United States	International	Hard	(China) Han Xinyun	(Chile) Alexa Guarachi (New Zealand) Erin Routliffe	6–3, 6–2
Loss	5–8	Sep 2018	Tournoi de Québec, Canada	International	Carpet (i)	(Switzerland) Xenia Knoll	(United States) Asia Muhammad (United States) Maria Sanchez	4–6, 3–6
Loss	5–9	Oct 2018	Kremlin Cup, Russia	Premier	Hard (i)	(Romania) Raluca Olaru	(Russia) Alexandra Panova (Germany) Laura Siegemund	2–6, 6–7^{(2–7)}
Win	6–9	Aug 2019	Bronx Open, United States	International	Hard	(Spain) María José Martínez Sánchez	(Russia) Margarita Gasparyan (Romania) Monica Niculescu	7–5, 2–6, [10–7]
Loss	6–10	Jan 2020	Adelaide International, Australia	Premier	Hard	(Canada) Gabriela Dabrowski	(United States) Nicole Melichar (China) Xu Yifan	6–2, 5–7, [5–10]
Win	7–10	Mar 2021	Dubai Championships, UAE (2)	WTA 1000	Hard	(Chile) Alexa Guarachi	(China) Xu Yifan (China) Yang Zhaoxuan	6–0, 6–3
Loss	7–11	May 2021	Emilia-Romagna Open, Italy	WTA 250	Clay	(Slovenia) Andreja Klepač	(United States) Coco Gauff (United States) Caty McNally	3–6, 2–6
Win	8–11	Jun 2021	Bad Homburg Open, Germany	WTA 250	Grass	(Slovenia) Andreja Klepač	(Ukraine) Nadiia Kichenok (Romania) Raluca Olaru	6–3, 6–1
Win	9–11	Aug 2021	Silicon Valley Classic, United States	WTA 500	Hard	(Slovenia) Andreja Klepač	(Canada) Gabriela Dabrowski (Brazil) Luisa Stefani	6–1, 7–5
Loss	9–12	Aug 2021	Canadian Open, Canada	WTA 1000	Hard	(Slovenia) Andreja Klepač	(Canada) Gabriela Dabrowski (Brazil) Luisa Stefani	3–6, 4–6
Loss	9–13	Jan 2022	Adelaide International, Australia	WTA 500	Hard	(Slovenia) Andreja Klepač	(Australia) Ashleigh Barty (Australia) Storm Sanders	1–6, 4–6

== Grand Slam doubles performance timeline ==
Key
W	F	SF	QF	#R	RR	Q#	DNQ	A	NH

(W) winner; (F) finalist; (SF) semifinalist; (QF) quarterfinalist; (#R) rounds 4, 3, 2, 1; (RR) round-robin stage; (Q#) qualification round; (DNQ) did not qualify; (A) absent; (NH) not held; (SR) strike rate (events won / competed); (W–L) win–loss record.
To avoid confusion and double counting, these charts are updated at the conclusion of a tournament or when the player's participation has ended.

Tournament	2004	...	2010	2011	2012	2013	2014	2015	2016	2017	2018	2019	2020	2021	2022	W–L
Australian Open	1R		A	A	1R	2R	1R	1R	1R	1R	1R	2R	3R	SF	1R	8–12
French Open	1R		2R	1R	1R	2R	1R	1R	2R	2R	2R	1R	A	QF	A	8–12
Wimbledon	1R		Q1	Q1	2R	3R	1R	2R	2R	1R	1R	1R	NH	1R	A	5–10
US Open	A		1R	A	2R	1R	2R	1R	2R	1R	1R	1R	1R	3R	A	5–11
Win–loss	0–3		1–2	0–1	2–4	4–4	1–4	1–4	3–4	1–4	1–4	1–4	2–2	9–4	0–1	26–45

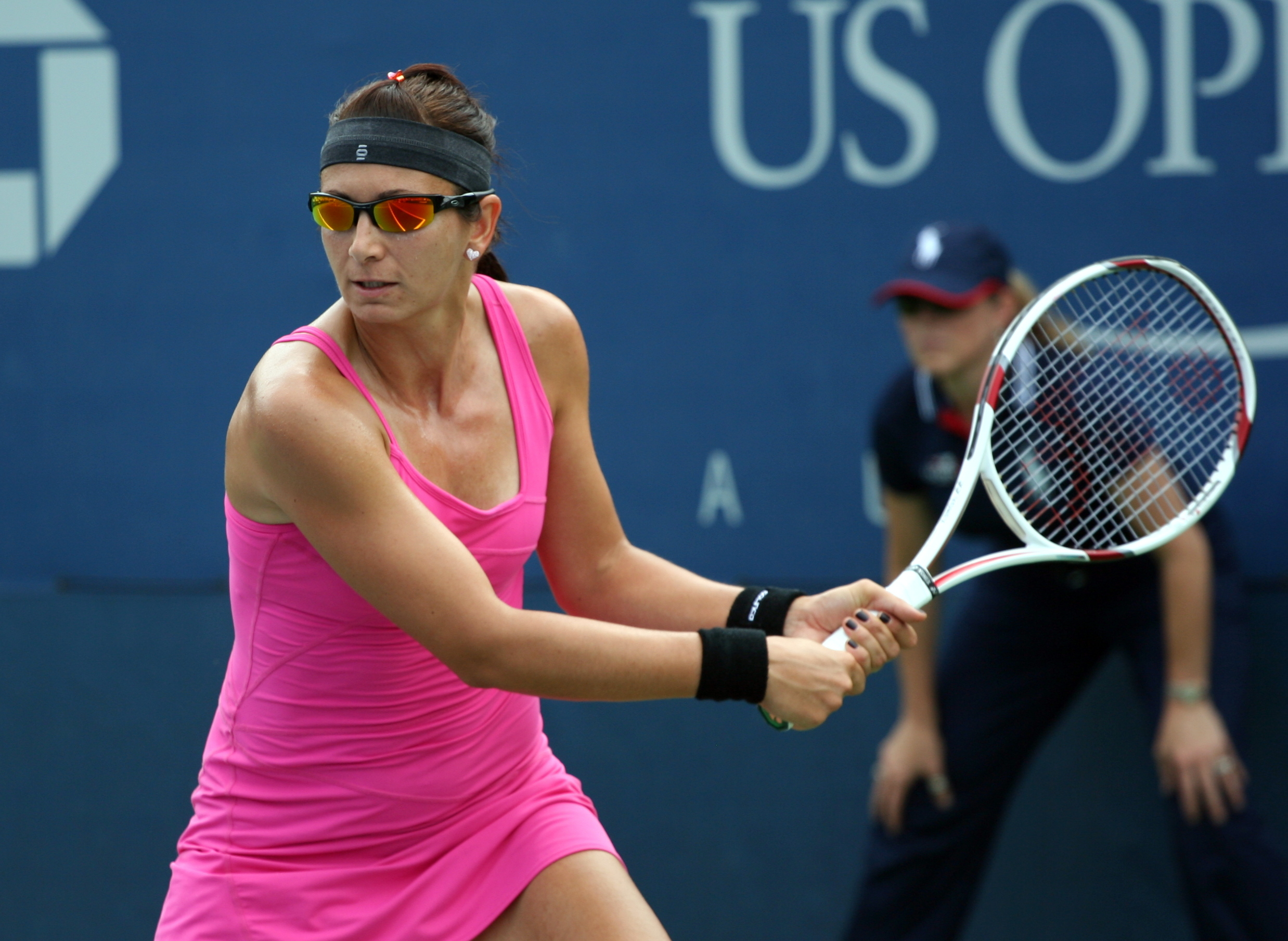
Darija Jurak, 2013

== WTA 125 finals ==
=== Doubles: 1 (runner-up) ===
Result	Date	Tournament	Surface	Partner	Opponents	Score
Loss	Sep 2015	Dalian Open, China	Hard	(Chinese Taipei) Chan Chin-wei	(China) Zhang Kailin (China) Zheng Saisai	3–6, 4–6

== ITF Circuit finals ==
Legend
$100,000 tournaments
$75,000 tournaments
$50,000 tournaments
$25,000 tournaments
$10,000 tournaments

=== Singles: 15 (8–7) ===
Result	W–L	Date	Tournament	Tier	Surface	Opponent	Score
Loss	1.	Apr 2002	ITF Cavtat, Croatia	10,000	Clay	(Slovakia) Linda Smolenaková	6–7^{(6)}, 3–6
Loss	2.	9 April 2003	ITF Cavtat, Croatia	10,000	Clay	(Romania) Monica Niculescu	4–6, 1–6
Win	1.	14 April 2003	ITF Dubrovnik, Croatia	10,000	Clay	(Croatia) Lucija Krzelj	6–4, 5–7, 6–3
Loss	3.	19 May 2003	ITF Biograd, Croatia	10,000	Clay	(Croatia) Lucija Krzelj	4–6, 4–6
Win	2.	26 May 2003	ITF Zadar, Croatia	10,000	Clay	(Czech Republic) Paulina Slitrová	2–6, 6–4, 6–4
Win	3.	June 2003	ITF Fontanafredda, Italy	25,000	Clay	(Hungary) Anna Foldenyi	7–6^{(2)}, 6–4
Loss	4.	August 2003	ITF Martina Franca, Italy	25,000	Clay	(Lithuania) Lina Stančiūtė	3–6, 1–6
Win	4.	April 2005	ITF Bari, Italy	25,000	Clay	(Czech Republic) Olga Vymetálková	6–3, 6–2
Win	5.	August 2005	ITF Bad Saulgau, Germany	10,000	Clay	(Serbia and Montenegro) Vanja Ćorović	6–1, 6–0
Loss	5.	February 2006	ITF Capriolo, Italy	25,000	Carpet (i)	(Czech Republic) Lucie Hradecká	1–6, 4–6
Win	6.	March 2006	ITF Rome, Italy	10,000	Clay	(Italy) Stefania Chieppa	3–6, 6–1, 7–6^{(5)}
Win	7.	March 2006	ITF Rome, Italy (2)	10,000	Clay	(Argentina) Belen Corbalan	7–5, 6–1
Win	8.	May 2007	ITF Vienna, Austria	10,000	Clay	(Brazil) Teliana Pereira	6–1, 1–6, 6–2
Loss	6.	4 May 2009	Wiesbaden Open, Germany	10,000	Clay	(Germany) Julia Babilon	1–6, 2–6
Loss	7.	10 August 2009	Reinert Open Versmold, Germany	10,000	Clay	(Germany) Sarah Gronert	3–6, 6–3, 6–7^{(5)}

=== Doubles: 64 (39–25) ===
Result	W–L	Date	Tournament	Tier	Surface	Partner	Opponents	Score
Win	1.	9 February 2003	ITF Bergamo, Italy	10,000	Hard (i)	(Croatia) Ana Vrljić	(Austria) Stefanie Haidner (Austria) Bianca Kamper	6–4, 6–4
Loss	1.	31 March 2003	ITF Makarska, Croatia	10,000	Clay	(Slovakia) Maria Kunová	(Romania) Gabriela Niculescu (Romania) Monica Niculescu	2–6, 2–6
Win	2.	9 April 2003	ITF Cavtat, Croatia	10,000	Clay	(Bosnia and Herzegovina) Mervana Jugić-Salkić	(Russia) Raissa Gourevitch (Russia) Nina Bratchikova	6–4, 6–4
Win	3.	14 April 2003	ITF Dubrovnik, Croatia	10,000	Clay	(Bosnia and Herzegovina) Mervana Jugić-Salkić	(Romania) Gabriela Niculescu (Romania) Monica Niculescu	6–2, 4–6, 6–2
Win	4.	19 May 2003	ITF Biograd, Croatia	10,000	Clay	(Bosnia and Herzegovina) Mervana Jugić-Salkić	(Czech Republic) Petra Cetkovská (Czech Republic) Pavlina Slitrová	6–4, 6–4
Win	5.	26 May 2003	ITF Zadar, Croatia	10,000	Clay	(Bosnia and Herzegovina) Mervana Jugić-Salkić	(Austria) Daniela Klemenschits (Austria) Sandra Klemenschits	6–3, 6–1
Win	6.	9 June 2003	Grado Tennis Cup, Italy	25,000	Clay	(Bosnia and Herzegovina) Mervana Jugić-Salkić	(Italy) Laura Dell'Angelo (Italy) Giorgia Mortello	2–6, 6–3, 6–0
Win	7.	3 August 2003	ITF Cuneo, Italy	50,000	Clay	(Bosnia and Herzegovina) Mervana Jugić-Salkić	(Bulgaria) Lubomira Bacheva (Austria) Stefanie Haidner	6–1, 6–2
Win	8.	16 August 2003	ITF Martina Franca, Italy	25,000	Clay	(Bosnia and Herzegovina) Mervana Jugić-Salkić	(Spain) Paula García (Spain) María José Martínez Sánchez	2–6, 6–4, 6–1
Win	9.	25 August 2003	ITF Rimini, Italy	25,000	Clay	(Bosnia and Herzegovina) Mervana Jugić-Salkić	(Italy) Alice Canepa (Italy) Emily Stellato	7–6^{(3)}, 6–7^{(7)}, 7–5
Win	10.	7 September 2003	ITF Torino, Italy	25,000	Clay	(Bosnia and Herzegovina) Mervana Jugić-Salkić	(Ukraine) Yuliana Fedak (Ukraine) Olga Lazarchuk	6–4, 6–2
Win	11.	19 October 2003	ITF Saint-Raphaël, France	25,000	Hard (i)	(Bosnia and Herzegovina) Mervana Jugić-Salkić	(Estonia) Maret Ani (France) Camille Pin	6–2, 6–1
Win	12.	25 November 2003	ITF Průhonice, Czech Republic	25,000	Carpet (i)	(Bosnia and Herzegovina) Mervana Jugić-Salkić	(Czech Republic) Olga Vymetálková (Czech Republic) Gabriela Navrátilová	7–5, 6–7^{(8)}, 6–3
Win	13.	6 April 2004	Open de Saint-Malo, France	50,000	Clay (i)	(Russia) Galina Voskoboeva	(Russia) Goulnara Fattakhetdinova (Russia) Anastasia Rodionova	6–3, 6–2
Loss	2.	28 June 2004	ITF Stuttgart, Germany	25,000	Clay	(Ukraine) Mariya Koryttseva	(Germany) Vanessa Henke (Netherlands) Anousjka van Exel	4–6, 5–7
Loss	3.	7 September 2004	ITF Fano, Italy	50,000	Clay	(Bosnia and Herzegovina) Mervana Jugić-Salkić	(Romania) Delia Sescioreanu (Romania) Andreea Ehritt-Vanc	5–7, 6–1, 2–6
Loss	4.	20 September 2004	ITF Biella, Italy	50,000	Clay	(Bosnia and Herzegovina) Mervana Jugić-Salkić	(Argentina) Erica Krauth (Germany) Martina Müller	2–6, 3–6
Win	14.	28 September 2004	ITF Belgrade, Serbia	25,000	Clay	(Italy) Giulia Casoni	(Russia) Ekaterina Bychkova (Belarus) Nadejda Ostrovskaya	6–0, 6–2
Win	15.	4 October 2004	ITF Dubrovnik, Croatia (2)	10,000	Clay	(Croatia) Lucija Krzelj	(Poland) Olga Brózda (Poland) Sylwia Niedbalo	4–6, 6–2, 6–4
Win	16.	11 October 2004	ITF Dubrovnik, Croatia (3)	10,000	Clay	(Croatia) Lucija Krzelj	(Czech Republic) Klara Jagosova (Hungary) Barbara Pócza	6–3, 4–6, 6–3
Win	17.	11 January 2005	ITF Stuttgart, Germany	10,000	Hard (i)	(Bosnia and Herzegovina) Mervana Jugić-Salkić	(Netherlands) Danielle Harmsen (Netherlands) Eva Pera	6–3, 7–5
Win	18.	16 January 2005	ITF Grenoble, France	10,000	Hard (i)	(Bosnia and Herzegovina) Mervana Jugić-Salkić	(France) Émilie Bacquet (France) Anaïs Laurendon	6–2, 6–2
Loss	5.	1 February 2005	ITF Ortisei, Italy	75,000	Carpet (i)	(Bosnia and Herzegovina) Mervana Jugić-Salkić	(Slovenia) Tina Pisnik (Czech Republic) Barbora Záhlavová-Strýcová	2–6, 6–3, 6–7^{(1)}
Win	19.	1 March 2005	ITF Buchen, Germany	10,000	Hard (i)	(Bosnia and Herzegovina) Mervana Jugić-Salkić	(Germany) Korina Perkovic (Germany) Andrea Petkovic	6–2, 6–2
Win	20.	26 April 2005	ITF Taranto, Italy	25,000	Clay	(Bosnia and Herzegovina) Mervana Jugić-Salkić	(Belarus) Nadejda Ostrovskaya (Belarus) Tatiana Poutchek	6–3, 6–7^{(7)}, 6–3
Win	21.	21 June 2005	ITF Fontanafredda, Italy	25,000	Clay	(Bosnia and Herzegovina) Mervana Jugić-Salkić	(Slovakia) Eva Fislová (Slovakia) Stanislava Hrozenská	5–7, 6–3, 6–4
Loss	6.	2 August 2005	ITF Bad Saulgau, Germany	10,000	Clay	(Bosnia and Herzegovina) Sandra Martinović	(Uzbekistan) Ivanna Israilova (Russia) Elena Chalova	4–6, 6–4, 4–6
Win	22.	12 December 2005	ITF Valašské Meziříčí, Czech Republic	25,000	Hard (i)	(Czech Republic) Renata Voráčová	(Czech Republic) Lucie Hradecká (Czech Republic) Sandra Záhlavová	6–3, 6–3
Win	23.	11 January 2006	ITF Stuttgart, Germany (2)	10,000	Hard (i)	(Czech Republic) Renata Voráčová	(France) Kildine Chevalier (France) Julie Coin	6–2, 6–1
Loss	7.	22 February 2006	Biberach Open, Germany	25,000	Hard (i)	(Czech Republic) Renata Voráčová	(Czech Republic) Lucie Hradecká (Czech Republic) Olga Vymetálková	6–2, 4–6, 6–7^{(4)}
Win	24.	14 March 2006	ITF Rome, Italy	10,000	Clay	(Germany) Carmen Klaschka	(Croatia) Gianna Doz (Austria) Stefanie Haidner	6–2, 6–2
Loss	8.	18 April 2006	ITF Bari, Italy	25,000	Clay	(Austria) Stefanie Haidner	(Italy) Romina Oprandi (Germany) Caroline Schneider	5–7, 2–6
Win	25.	26 June 2006	ITF Padova, Italy	25,000	Clay	(Czech Republic) Renata Voráčová	(Brazil) Larissa Carvalho (Slovenia) Andreja Klepač	6–4, 6–3
Loss	9.	6 July 2006	ITF Rome, Italy	25,000	Clay	(Hungary) Kira Nagy	(Croatia) Matea Mezak (Croatia) Nika Ožegović	2–6, 3–6
Loss	10.	14 February 2007	Biberach Open, Germany	25,000	Hard (i)	(Bosnia and Herzegovina) Sandra Martinović	(Russia) Nina Bratchikova (Poland) Urszula Radwańska	2–6, 0–6
Loss	11.	3 July 2007	ITF Stuttgart, Germany	25,000	Clay	(Germany) Carmen Klaschka	(Belarus) Ekaterina Dzehalevich (Belgium) Yanina Wickmayer	3–6, 2–6
Loss	12.	6 August 2007	Ladies Open Hechingen, Germany	25,000	Clay	(Bosnia and Herzegovina) Sandra Martinović	(Czech Republic) Michaela Paštiková (Germany) Kathrin Wörle	4–6, 4–6
Win	26.	21 August 2007	Maribor Open, Slovenia	25,000	Clay	(Czech Republic) Michaela Paštiková	(Serbia) Ana Jovanović (Germany) Laura Siegemund	1–6, 6–4, 6–1
Loss	13.	10 December 2007	ITF Valašské Meziříčí, Czech Republic	25,000	Hard (i)	(Croatia) Ivana Lisjak	(Czech Republic) Andrea Hlaváčková (Czech Republic) Lucie Hradecká	2–6, 1–6
Loss	14.	18 February 2008	ITF Capriolo, Italy	25,000	Carpet (i)	(Croatia) Ivana Lisjak	(South Africa) Kelly Anderson (United Kingdom) Sarah Borwell	6–7^{(7)}, 4–6
Win	27.	19 May 2008	ITF Gorizia, Italy	10,000	Clay	(Italy) Lisa Sabino	(Slovenia) Maja Kambič (Slovenia) Anja Prislan	6–0, 6–1
Loss	15.	4 August 2008	Ladies Open Hechingen, Germany	25,000	Clay	(Germany) Carmen Klaschka	(Indonesia) Yayuk Basuki (Indonesia) Romana Tedjakusuma	6–2, 2–6, [6–10]
Loss	16.	1 September 2008	ITF Alphen aan den Rijn, Netherlands	25,000	Clay	(Serbia) Vojislava Lukić	(Argentina) Florencia Molinero (Ukraine) Lesia Tsurenko	6–4, 5–7, [7–10]
Loss	17.	27 October 2008	Open Nantes, France	50,000	Hard (i)	(Slovenia) Maša Zec Peškirič	(Belarus) Ekaterina Dzehalevich (Ukraine) Yuliana Fedak	3–6, 4–6
Win	28.	26 January 2009	ITF Laguna Niguel, U.S.	25,000	Hard	(Germany) Vanessa Henke	(United States) Megan Moulton-Levy (Germany) Laura Siegemund	4–6, 6–3, [10–8]
Loss	18.	13 April 2009	ITF Tessenderlo, Belgium	25,000	Clay (i)	(Switzerland) Stefania Boffa	(France) Yulia Fedossova (France) Virginie Pichet	5–7, 3–6
Win	29.	6 July 2009	Zagreb Ladies Open, Croatia	75,000	Clay	(Czech Republic) Renata Voráčová	(Russia) Elena Chalova (Russia) Anastasia Poltoratskaya	6–2, 7–5
Win	30.	13 July 2009	ITF Zwevegem, Belgium	25,000	Clay	(Russia) Elena Chalova	(Japan) Yurika Sema (France) Aurélie Védy	6–1, 6–4
Loss	19.	20 July 2009	ITF Pétange, Luxembourg	75,000	Clay	(Germany) Kathrin Wörle	(France) Stéphanie Cohen-Aloro (Tunisia) Selima Sfar	2–6, 6–3, [7–10]
Loss	20.	27 July 2009	ITF Bad Saulgau, Germany	25,000	Clay	(Japan) Yurika Sema	(Denmark) Hanne Skak Jensen (Sweden) Johanna Larsson	2–6, 3–6
Win	31.	17 August 2009	ITF Wahlstedt, Germany	10,000	Clay	(Serbia) Neda Kozić	(Italy) Lisa Sabino (Italy) Vivienne Vierin	6–2, 6–4
Loss	21.	30 November 2009	Zubr Cup Přerov, Czech Republic	25,000	Hard (i)	(Hungary) Katalin Marosi	(Austria) Sandra Klemenschits (Slovenia) Andreja Klepač	6–7^{(3)}, 6–3, [7–10]
Win	32.	26 April 2010	Open de Cagnes-sur-Mer, France	100,000	Clay	(Bosnia and Herzegovina) Mervana Jugić-Salkić	(France) Stéphanie Cohen-Aloro (France) Kristina Mladenovic	0–6, 6–2, [10–5]
Loss	22.	1 November 2010	Open Nantes, France	50,000	Hard (i)	(Bosnia and Herzegovina) Mervana Jugić-Salkić	(United Kingdom) Anne Keothavong (United Kingdom) Anna Smith	7–5, 1–6, [6–10]
Win	33.	17 January 2011	Open Andrézieux-Bouthéon, France	25,000	Hard	(Russia) Valeria Savinykh	(Netherlands) Kiki Bertens (Netherlands) Richèl Hogenkamp	6–3, 7–6^{(0)}
Loss	23.	31 January 2011	ITF Surrey, UK	25,000	Hard (i)	(Poland) Marta Domachowska	(Finland) Emma Laine (United Kingdom) Melanie South	3–6, 7–5, [8–10]
Loss	24.	28 February 2011	ITF Antalya, Turkey	10,000	Clay	(Poland) Katarzyna Kawa	(China) Liang Chen (China) Tian Ran	6–4, 2–6, [6–10]
Loss	25.	2 May 2011	Open de Cagnes-sur-Mer, France	100,000	Clay	(Czech Republic) Renata Voráčová	(Germany) Anna-Lena Grönefeld (Croatia) Petra Martić	6–1, 2–6, [9–11]
Win	34.	29 June 2011	ITF Stuttgart, Germany	25,000	Clay	(France) Anaïs Laurendon	(Czech Republic) Hana Birnerová (Liechtenstein) Stephanie Vogt	4–6, 6–1, [10–0]
Win	35.	12 September 2011	Sofia Cup, Bulgaria	100,000	Clay	(Russia) Nina Bratchikova	(Romania) Alexandra Cadanțu (Romania) Raluca Olaru	6–4, 7–5
Win	36.	19 September 2011	Open de Saint-Malo, France (2)	100,000	Clay	(Russia) Nina Bratchikova	(Sweden) Johanna Larsson (Germany) Jasmin Wöhr	6–4, 6–2
Win	37.	28 November 2011	Dubai Tennis Challenge, UAE	75,000	Hard	(Russia) Nina Bratchikova	(Uzbekistan) Akgul Amanmuradova (Romania) Alexandra Dulgheru	6–4, 3–6, [10–6]
Win	38.	19 December 2011	Ankara Cup, Turkey	50,000	Hard (i)	(Russia) Nina Bratchikova	(Slovakia) Janette Husárová (Hungary) Katalin Marosi	6–4, 6–2
Win	39.	21 April 2018	Chiasso Open, Switzerland	25,000	Clay	(Australia) Jessica Moore	(Netherlands) Cindy Burger (Netherlands) Rosalie van der Hoek	7–6^{(6)}, 4–6, [10–8]
