= 2017 Hua Hin Championships – Women's singles =

Women's singles
- 2017 Hua Hin Championships

Final
- Champion: (Switzerland) Belinda Bencic
- Runner-up: (Chinese Taipei) Hsieh Su-wei
- Score: 6–3, 6–4

Events
Singles	men	women
Doubles	men	women
- Hua Hin Championships

Yaroslava Shvedova was the defending champion from 2015, when the event was last held, but did not participate this year due to injury.

Belinda Bencic won the title, defeating Hsieh Su-wei 6–3, 6–4 in the final.

== Seeds ==
1. (China) Wang Qiang (first round)
2. (Russia) Evgeniya Rodina (second round)
3. (China) Duan Yingying (quarterfinals)
4. (Chinese Taipei) Hsieh Su-wei (final)
5. (Belgium) Yanina Wickmayer (second round)
6. (Romania) Ana Bogdan (semifinals)
7. (Japan) Misaki Doi (first round)
8. (United Kingdom) Naomi Broady (first round)

== Draw ==
Key

- Q = Qualifier
- WC = Wild card
- LL = Lucky loser
- Alt = Alternate
- ITF = ITF entry
- PR = Protected ranking
- SR = Special ranking
- SE = Special exempt
- JE = Junior exempt
- JR = Junior Accelerator Programme entrant
- CO = College Accelerator Programme entrant
- NG = Next Gen Accelerator Program entrant
- w/o = Walkover
- r = Retired
- d = Defaulted

=== Finals ===
Semifinals
(Switzerland) Belinda Bencic	7^{7}	6
6	(Romania) Ana Bogdan	6^{3}	4
4	(Chinese Taipei) Hsieh Su-wei	6	7^{7}
(Switzerland) Viktorija Golubic	3	6^{4}

Final
(Switzerland) Belinda Bencic	6	6
4	(Chinese Taipei) Hsieh Su-wei	3	4

=== Top half ===
First round
1/WC	(China) Q Wang	5	6	4
(Russia) K Lykina	7	3	6
(Switzerland) B Bencic	6	6
Q	(Mexico) G Olmos	2	1
(Russia) V Diatchenko	6	6
(Poland) M Fręch	4	2
(Russia) I Khromacheva	6	6
7	(Japan) M Doi	4	2
3	(China) Y Duan	6	6
Q	(United States) E Bektas	1	1
WC	(Thailand) Vara Wongteanchai	7^{9}	6^{7}	6
(China) X Gao	6^{7}	7^{9}	2
Q	(Russia) V Kudermetova	6	6
(Italy) J Paolini	1	4
WC	(Thailand) C Jandakate	1	2
6	(Romania) A Bogdan	6	6

Second round
(Russia) K Lykina	2	4
(Switzerland) B Bencic	6	6
(Russia) V Diatchenko	7	6
(Russia) I Khromacheva	5	3
3	(China) Y Duan	3	6	6
WC	(Thailand) Vara Wongteanchai	6	4	4
Q	(Russia) V Kudermetova	3	1
6	(Romania) A Bogdan	6	6

Quarterfinals
(Switzerland) B Bencic	0	6	6
(Russia) V Diatchenko	6	4	2
3	(China) Y Duan	1	3
6	(Romania) A Bogdan	6	6

Semifinals
(Switzerland) B Bencic	7^{7}	6
6	(Romania) A Bogdan	6^{3}	4

=== Bottom half ===
First round
8	(United Kingdom) N Broady	4	5
(Turkey) İ Soylu	6	7
(Austria) B Haas	6	6
WC	(Thailand) P Plipuech	4	2
(Czech Republic) M Bouzková	4	7^{12}	6
(Netherlands) A Rus	6	6^{10}	3
(China) Y Wang	5	3
4	(Chinese Taipei) S-w Hsieh	7	6
5	(Belgium) Y Wickmayer	7^{7}	6
(Russia) V Zvonareva	6^{4}	3
(Thailand) L Kumkhum	6	6
Q	(Hungary) F Stollár	1	4
WC	(Thailand) Yanin Wisitwarapron	0	0
(Switzerland) V Golubic	6	6
(Uzbekistan) S Sharipova	4	6	3
2	(Russia) E Rodina	6	3	6

Second round
(Turkey) İ Soylu	7^{7}	2	4
(Austria) B Haas	6^{5}	6	6
(Czech Republic) M Bouzková	4	1
4	(Chinese Taipei) S-w Hsieh	6	6
5	(Belgium) Y Wickmayer	2	6	6^{3}
(Thailand) L Kumkhum	6	4	7^{7}
(Switzerland) V Golubic	6	6
2	(Russia) E Rodina	1	1

Quarterfinals
(Austria) B Haas	1	5
4	(Chinese Taipei) S-w Hsieh	6	7
(Thailand) L Kumkhum	6^{2}	0
(Switzerland) V Golubic	7^{7}	6

Semifinals
4	(Chinese Taipei) S-w Hsieh	6	7^{7}
(Switzerland) V Golubic	3	6^{4}

== Qualifying ==
=== Seeds ===
1. (China) Zhang Kailin (first round)
2. (China) Lu Jiajing (first round)
3. (Hungary) Fanny Stollár (qualified)
4. (Slovenia) Dalila Jakupović (first round)
5. (Russia) Victoria Kamenskaya (qualifying competition)
6. (United States) Emina Bektas (qualified)
7. (Russia) Veronika Kudermetova (qualified)
8. (Japan) Hiroko Kuwata (first round)

=== Qualifiers ===
1. (United States) Emina Bektas
2. (Russia) Veronika Kudermetova
3. (Hungary) Fanny Stollár
4. (Mexico) Giuliana Olmos

=== Qualifying draw ===
==== First qualifier ====
First round
1	(China) Zhang Kailin	4	6^{5}
(Thailand) Nudnida Luangnam	6	7^{7}
(Germany) Vivian Heisen	4	4
6	(United States) Emina Bektas	6	6

Qualifying competition
(Thailand) Nudnida Luangnam	0	1
6	(United States) Emina Bektas	6	6

==== Second qualifier ====
First round
2	(China) Lu Jiajing	4	4
(United States) Sabrina Santamaria	6	6
(Thailand) Patcharin Cheapchandej	3	1
7	(Russia) Veronika Kudermetova	6	6

Qualifying competition
(United States) Sabrina Santamaria	2	3
7	(Russia) Veronika Kudermetova	6	6

==== Third qualifier ====
First round
3	(Hungary) Fanny Stollár	6	6
WC	(Thailand) Plobrung Plipuech	1	1
WC	(Hong Kong) Ng Kwan-yau	1	2
5	(Russia) Victoria Kamenskaya	6	6

Qualifying competition
3	(Hungary) Fanny Stollár	6	6
5	(Russia) Victoria Kamenskaya	2	2

==== Fourth qualifier ====
First round
4	(Slovenia) Dalila Jakupović	7	6^{4}	2
(Thailand) Nicha Lertpitaksinchai	5	7^{7}	6
(Mexico) Giuliana Olmos	6	6
8	(Japan) Hiroko Kuwata	3	2

Qualifying competition
(Thailand) Nicha Lertpitaksinchai	4	4
(Mexico) Giuliana Olmos	6	6
