= Phongsapak Kerdlaphee =

Thai tennis player

- Country (sports): Thailand
- Born: 7 May 1998 (age 26)
- Plays: Right-handed (two-handed backhand)
- Prize money: $4,656

Singles
- Career record: 0–0 (at ATP Tour level, Grand Slam level, and in Davis Cup)
- Career titles: 0
- Highest ranking: No. 1768 (25 September 2017)

Doubles
- Career record: 0–1 (at ATP Tour level, Grand Slam level, and in Davis Cup)
- Career titles: 0
- Highest ranking: No. 1602 (10 September 2018)
- Current ranking: No. 2234 (2 March 2020)
- Last updated on: 7 March 2020.

Phongsapak Kerdlaphee (born 7 May 1998) is a Thai tennis player.

Kerdlaphee has a career high ATP singles ranking of 1768 achieved on 25 September 2017. He also has a career high ATP doubles ranking of 1602 achieved on 10 September 2018.

Kerdlaphee represents Thailand at the Davis Cup, where he has a W/L record of 0–1.
