= 2017 Bol Open – Singles =

Singles
- 2017 Bol Open

Final
- Champion: (Serbia) Aleksandra Krunić
- Runner-up: (Romania) Alexandra Cadanțu
- Score: 6–3, 3–0, ret.

Events
Singles	Doubles
← 2016 ·	Bol Open	· 2018 →

Mandy Minella was the defending champion, but lost to Alexandra Cadanțu in the semifinals.

Aleksandra Krunić won the title, after Cadanțu retired at 3–6, 0–3.

== Seeds ==
1. (Sweden) Johanna Larsson (second round)
2. (Luxembourg) Mandy Minella (semifinals)
3. (Russia) Natalia Vikhlyantseva (first round)
4. (Spain) Sara Sorribes Tormo (first round)
5. (Italy) Sara Errani (quarterfinals)
6. (Ukraine) Kateryna Bondarenko (quarterfinals)
7. (Slovakia) Kristína Kučová (first round)
8. (Greece) Maria Sakkari (quarterfinals)

== Draw ==
=== Key ===
- Q = Qualifier
- WC = Wild card
- LL = Lucky loser
- Alt = Alternate
- ITF = ITF entry
- PR = Protected ranking
- SR = Special ranking
- SE = Special exempt
- JE = Junior exempt
- JR = Junior Accelerator Programme entrant
- CO = College Accelerator Programme entrant
- NG = Next Gen Accelerator Program entrant
- w/o = Walkover
- r = Retired
- d = Defaulted

=== Finals ===
Semifinals
(Brazil) Beatriz Haddad Maia	6	2	0
(Serbia) Aleksandra Krunić	1	6	6
(Romania) Alexandra Cadanțu	6	7
2	(Luxembourg) Mandy Minella	2	5

Final
(Serbia) Aleksandra Krunić	6	3
(Romania) Alexandra Cadanțu	3	0^{r}

=== Top half ===
First round
1	(Sweden) J Larsson	6	6
(Bulgaria) E Kostova	2	3
(Russia) A Panova	2	2
(Brazil) B Haddad Maia	6	6
(Japan) M Eguchi	0	3
(Spain) O Sáez Larra	6	6
(Bulgaria) A Naydenova	1	4
5/WC	(Italy) S Errani	6	6
4	(Spain) S Sorribes Tormo	5	4
(Serbia) A Krunić	7	6
(Belarus) O Govortsova	6	6
(Belgium) M Zanevska	3	4
Q	(Croatia) A Biškić	1	1
(North Macedonia) L Gjorcheska	6	6
(Serbia) I Jorović	6	7
7	(Slovakia) K Kučová	0	5

Second round
1	(Sweden) J Larsson	6^{3}	1
(Brazil) B Haddad Maia	7^{7}	6
(Spain) O Sáez Larra	5	3
5/WC	(Italy) S Errani	7	6
(Serbia) A Krunić	6	6
(Belarus) O Govortsova	0	4
(North Macedonia) L Gjorcheska	4	7	2
(Serbia) I Jorović	6	5	6

Quarterfinals
(Brazil) B Haddad Maia	6	6
5/WC	(Italy) S Errani	1	4
(Serbia) A Krunić	6	6
(Serbia) I Jorović	3	1

Semifinals
(Brazil) B Haddad Maia	6	2	0
(Serbia) A Krunić	1	6	6

=== Bottom half ===
First round
8	(Greece) M Sakkari	6	4	6
WC	(Croatia) A Tomljanović	4	6	1
(Belgium) A Van Uytvanck	6	6
(Czech Republic) R Voráčová	0	4
(Croatia) T Mrdeža	6	6
Q	(India) P Thombare	0	0
(Romania) A Cadanțu	6	6
3/WC	(Russia) N Vikhlyantseva	4	3
6	(Ukraine) K Bondarenko	7^{7}	1	6
(Bulgaria) V Tomova	6^{4}	6	1
Q	(Switzerland) X Knoll	3	1
WC	(Croatia) T Lukas	6	6
Q	(Chinese Taipei) C-j Chuang	6	6
(Slovenia) T Zidanšek	4	4
(United States) N Gibbs	4	2
2	(Luxembourg) M Minella	6	6

Second round
8	(Greece) M Sakkari	w/o
(Belgium) A Van Uytvanck
(Croatia) T Mrdeža	6	3	2
(Romania) A Cadanțu	3	6	6
6	(Ukraine) K Bondarenko	6	6
WC	(Croatia) T Lukas	0	2
Q	(Chinese Taipei) C-j Chuang	2	6^{6}
2	(Luxembourg) M Minella	6	7^{8}

Quarterfinals
8	(Greece) M Sakkari	4	0
(Romania) A Cadanțu	6	6
6	(Ukraine) K Bondarenko	2	1
2	(Luxembourg) M Minella	6	6

Semifinals
(Romania) A Cadanțu	6	7
2	(Luxembourg) M Minella	2	5

== Qualifying ==
=== Seeds ===
1. (Croatia) Ani Mijačika (qualifying competition)
2. (Czech Republic) Renata Voráčová (moved to main draw)
3. (Switzerland) Xenia Knoll (qualified)
4. (India) Prarthana Thombare (qualified)
5. (Croatia) Ana Biškić (qualified)

=== Qualifiers ===
1. (Chinese Taipei) Chuang Chia-jung
2. (Croatia) Ana Biškić
3. (Switzerland) Xenia Knoll
4. (India) Prarthana Thombare

=== Qualifying draw ===
==== First qualifier ====
Qualifying competition
1	(Croatia) Ani Mijačika	3	6^{4}
	(Chinese Taipei) Chuang Chia-jung	6	7^{7}

==== Second qualifier ====
Qualifying competition
5	(Croatia) Ana Biškić	6	6
	(Germany) Jasmin Jebawy	2	4

==== Third qualifier ====
Qualifying competition
3	(Switzerland) Xenia Knoll	6	3	6
WC	(Italy) Giulia Pairone	4	6	3

==== Fourth qualifier ====
Qualifying competition
4/WC	(India) Prarthana Thombare	6	6
WC	(Bosnia and Herzegovina) Ema Mulalić	0	3
