= 2017 Hua Hin Championships – Women's doubles =

Women's doubles
- 2017 Hua Hin Championships

Final
- Champion: (China) Duan Yingying (China) Wang Yafan
- Runner-up: (Slovenia) Dalila Jakupović (Russia) Irina Khromacheva
- Score: 6–3, 6–3

Events
Singles	men	women
Doubles	men	women
- Hua Hin Championships

Liang Chen and Wang Yafan were the defending champions when the event was previously held in 2015, however, Liang chose not to participate. Wang successfully defended her title alongside Duan Yingying, defeating Dalila Jakupović and Irina Khromacheva 6–3, 6–3 in the final.

== Seeds ==
1. (Russia) Veronika Kudermetova / (Turkey) İpek Soylu (semifinals)
2. (Australia) Monique Adamczak / (United Kingdom) Naomi Broady (semifinals)
3. (Slovenia) Dalila Jakupović / (Russia) Irina Khromacheva (final)
4. (United States) Desirae Krawczyk / (Mexico) Giuliana Olmos (quarterfinals)

== Draw ==
Key

- Q = Qualifier
- WC = Wild card
- LL = Lucky loser
- Alt = Alternate
- ITF = ITF entry
- PR = Protected ranking
- SR = Special ranking
- SE = Special exempt
- JE = Junior exempt
- JR = Junior Accelerator Programme entrant
- CO = College Accelerator Programme entrant
- NG = Next Gen Accelerator Program entrant
- w/o = Walkover
- r = Retired
- d = Defaulted

First round
1	(Russia) V Kudermetova (Turkey) İ Soylu	7^{7}	6
WC	(Thailand) C Jandakate (Thailand) T Momkoonthod	6^{4}	2
(Japan) M Doi (Switzerland) V Golubic	6	2	[6]
(United States) E Bektas (United States) S Santamaria	4	6	[10]
4	(United States) D Krawczyk (Mexico) G Olmos	6	6
(Poland) M Fręch (Germany) V Heisen	3	4
(China) Y Duan (China) Y Wang	6	6
(Netherlands) A Rus (Netherlands) E Wacanno	2	4
(United States) K Christian (Uzbekistan) S Sharipova	5	4
(Japan) H Kuwata (Russia) K Lykina	7	6
(Thailand) Vara Wongteanchai (Thailand) Varu Wongteanchai	6	3	[7]
3	(Slovenia) D Jakupović (Russia) I Khromacheva	4	6	[10]
(Thailand) L Kumkhum (Thailand) N Luangnam	6	2	[12]
(Thailand) N Lertpitaksinchai (Thailand) P Plipuech	4	6	[10]
(Hungary) F Stollár (India) P Thombare	6^{8}	3
2	(Australia) M Adamczak (United Kingdom) N Broady	7^{10}	6

Quarterfinals
1	(Russia) V Kudermetova (Turkey) İ Soylu	7^{7}	6
(United States) E Bektas (United States) S Santamaria	6^{4}	2
4	(United States) D Krawczyk (Mexico) G Olmos	5	7^{7}	[10]
(China) Y Duan (China) Y Wang	7	6^{5}	[12]
(Japan) H Kuwata (Russia) K Lykina	0	3
3	(Slovenia) D Jakupović (Russia) I Khromacheva	6	6
(Thailand) L Kumkhum (Thailand) N Luangnam	2	4
2	(Australia) M Adamczak (United Kingdom) N Broady	6	6

Semifinals
1	(Russia) V Kudermetova (Turkey) İ Soylu	7^{7}	2	[5]
(China) Y Duan (China) Y Wang	6^{2}	6	[10]
3	(Slovenia) D Jakupović (Russia) I Khromacheva	6	6
2	(Australia) M Adamczak (United Kingdom) N Broady	4	1

Final
(China) Y Duan (China) Y Wang	6	6
3	(Slovenia) D Jakupović (Russia) I Khromacheva	3	3
