= 2017 OEC Taipei WTA Challenger – Doubles =

Doubles
- 2017 OEC Taipei WTA Challenger

Final
- Champions: (Russia) Veronika Kudermetova (Belarus) Aryna Sabalenka
- Runners-up: (Australia) Monique Adamczak (United Kingdom) Naomi Broady
- Score: 2–6, 7–6^{(7–5)}, [10–6]

Events
Singles	Doubles
- OEC Taipei WTA Challenger

Natela Dzalamidze and Veronika Kudermetova were the defending champions, but Dzalamidze chose not to participate. Kudermetova successfully defended her title, this time alongside Aryna Sabalenka, defeating Monique Adamczak and Naomi Broady 2–6, 7–6^{(7–5)}, [10–6] in the final.

== Seeds ==
1. (Japan) Eri Hozumi / (Japan) Makoto Ninomiya (first round)
2. (Australia) Arina Rodionova / (Serbia) Nina Stojanović (semifinals)
3. (Australia) Monique Adamczak / (United Kingdom) Naomi Broady (final)
4. (Slovenia) Dalila Jakupović / (Russia) Irina Khromacheva (quarterfinals)

== Draw ==
Key

- Q = Qualifier
- WC = Wild card
- LL = Lucky loser
- Alt = Alternate
- ITF = ITF entry
- PR = Protected ranking
- SR = Special ranking
- SE = Special exempt
- JE = Junior exempt
- JR = Junior Accelerator Programme entrant
- CO = College Accelerator Programme entrant
- NG = Next Gen Accelerator Program entrant
- w/o = Walkover
- r = Retired
- d = Defaulted

=== Draw ===
First round
1	(Japan) E Hozumi (Japan) M Ninomiya	0	6^{4}
(Russia) V Kudermetova (Belarus) A Sabalenka	6	7^{7}
(Mexico) V Rodríguez (Canada) C Zhao	4	1
(Japan) M Doi (Switzerland) V Golubic	6	6
4	(Slovenia) D Jakupović (Russia) I Khromacheva	6	6
(Australia) P Hon (China) Jin Lu	1	4
(United States) D Krawczyk (Mexico) G Olmos	6	5	[3]
(Netherlands) A Rus (Netherlands) E Wacanno	3	7	[10]
(Thailand) L Kumkhum (India) P Thombare	6	7
(Australia) L Cabrera (Hungary) F Stollár	4	5
(United States) K Christian (Australia) J Moore	1	3
3	(Australia) M Adamczak (United Kingdom) N Broady	6	6
WC	(Chinese Taipei) C-w Chan (Chinese Taipei) E-s Liang	2	5
(Russia) E Rodina (Belgium) Y Wickmayer	6	7
(United States) J Cako (China) L Zhu	4	2
2	(Australia) Ar Rodionova (Serbia) N Stojanović	6	6

Quarterfinals
(Russia) V Kudermetova (Belarus) A Sabalenka	2	7^{8}	[10]
(Japan) M Doi (Switzerland) V Golubic	6	6^{6}	[8]
4	(Slovenia) D Jakupović (Russia) I Khromacheva	2	4
(Netherlands) A Rus (Netherlands) E Wacanno	6	6
(Thailand) L Kumkhum (India) P Thombare	2	6	[8]
3	(Australia) M Adamczak (United Kingdom) N Broady	6	4	[10]
(Russia) E Rodina (Belgium) Y Wickmayer	3	2
2	(Australia) Ar Rodionova (Serbia) N Stojanović	6	6

Semifinals
(Russia) V Kudermetova (Belarus) A Sabalenka	7^{7}	6
(Netherlands) A Rus (Netherlands) E Wacanno	6^{5}	2
3	(Australia) M Adamczak (United Kingdom) N Broady	6	7
2	(Australia) Ar Rodionova (Serbia) N Stojanović	3	5

Final
(Russia) V Kudermetova (Belarus) A Sabalenka	2	7^{7}	[10]
3	(Australia) M Adamczak (United Kingdom) N Broady	6	6^{5}	[6]
