= 2017 Dalian Women's Tennis Open – Singles =

Singles
- 2017 Dalian Women's Tennis Open

Final
- Champion: (Ukraine) Kateryna Kozlova
- Runner-up: (Russia) Vera Zvonareva
- Score: 6–4, 6–2

Events
| Singles | Doubles |
| ← 2016 · | Dalian Women's Tennis Open | · 2018 → |

Kristýna Plíšková was the defending champion, but chose not to participate.

Kateryna Kozlova won the title after defeating Vera Zvonareva 6–4, 6–2 in the final.

== Seeds ==
1. (China) Duan Yingying (quarterfinals)
2. (Montenegro) Danka Kovinić (second round)
3. (Kazakhstan) Zarina Diyas (semifinals)
4. (Chinese Taipei) Chang Kai-chen (first round)
5. (Ukraine) Kateryna Kozlova (champion)
6. (China) Han Xinyun (quarterfinals)
7. (Belgium) Yanina Wickmayer (withdrew)
8. (Croatia) Jana Fett (second round)
9. (Australia) Arina Rodionova (second round)

== Draw ==
=== Key ===
- Q = Qualifier
- WC = Wild card
- LL = Lucky loser
- Alt = Alternate
- SE = Special exempt
- PR = Protected ranking
- ITF = ITF entry
- JE = Junior exempt
- w/o = Walkover
- r = Retired
- d = Defaulted
- SR = Special ranking

=== Finals ===
Semifinals
5 | (Ukraine) Kateryna Kozlova | 6 | 7
3 | (Kazakhstan) Zarina Diyas | 4 | 5
PR | (Russia) Vera Zvonareva | 6 | 6
PR | (Russia) Vitalia Diatchenko | 4 | 2

Final
5 | (Ukraine) Kateryna Kozlova | 6 | 6
PR | (Russia) Vera Zvonareva | 4 | 2

=== Top half ===
First round
1 | (China) Y Duan | 6 | 6
Q | (Indonesia) B Gumulya | 3 | 2
(China) F Liu | 6 | 6
LL | (Japan) H Kuwata | 1 | 0
WC | (China) Jia Lu | 6 | 6
Q | (China) X You | 2 | 4
(Thailand) Pe Plipuech | 3 | 2
5 | (Ukraine) K Kozlova | 6 | 6
3 | (Kazakhstan) Z Diyas | 6 | 4 | 6
WC | (China) Y Yuan | 4 | 6 | 2
Q | (China) M Wang | 7^{7} | 7
(China) F Xun | 6^{3} | 5
(United States) D Collins | 5 | 1
(China) Jin Lu | 7 | 6
(South Korea) N-l Han | 6 | 6^{4} | 4
6 | (China) X Han | 2 | 7^{7} | 6

Second round
1 | (China) Y Duan | 5 | 7^{10} | 6
(China) F Liu | 7 | 6^{8} | 4
WC | (China) Jia Lu | 3 | 2
5 | (Ukraine) K Kozlova | 6 | 6
3 | (Kazakhstan) Z Diyas | 6 | 6
Q | (China) M Wang | 1 | 3
(China) Jin Lu | 3 | 6 | 3
6 | (China) X Han | 6 | 1 | 6

Quarterfinals
1 | (China) Y Duan | 2 | 1
5 | (Ukraine) K Kozlova | 6 | 6
3 | (Kazakhstan) Z Diyas | 6 | 7^{7}
6 | (China) X Han | 2 | 6^{3}

Semifinals
5 | (Ukraine) K Kozlova | 6 | 7
3 | (Kazakhstan) Z Diyas | 4 | 5

=== Bottom half ===
First round
8 | (Croatia) J Fett | 6 | 7^{10}
Q | (China) Y Zhang | 1 | 6^{8}
WC | (China) W Zheng | 1 | 6 | 5
(Uzbekistan) S Sharipova | 6 | 3 | 7
(China) X Gao | 7^{8} | 6
PR | (Sweden) R Peterson | 6^{6} | 4
PR | (Russia) V Zvonareva | 6 | 6^{5} | 6
4 | (Chinese Taipei) K-c Chang | 3 | 7^{7} | 4
9 | (Australia) Ar Rodionova | 6 | 7^{7}
(South Korea) S-j Jang | 4 | 6^{3}
WC | (China) K Zhang | 7 | 6
LL | (Japan) E Sema | 5 | 2
(Japan) R Sawayanagi | 4 | 4
PR | (Russia) V Diatchenko | 6 | 6
(Slovenia) D Jakupović | 6 | 2 | 1
2 | (Montenegro) D Kovinić | 4 | 6 | 6

Second round
8 | (Croatia) J Fett | 4 | 6 | 2
(Uzbekistan) S Sharipova | 6 | 4 | 6
(China) X Gao | 4 | 4
PR | (Russia) V Zvonareva | 6 | 6
9 | (Australia) Ar Rodionova | 4 | 5
WC | (China) K Zhang | 6 | 7
PR | (Russia) V Diatchenko | 6 | 2 | 6
2 | (Montenegro) D Kovinić | 3 | 6 | 3

Quarterfinals
(Uzbekistan) S Sharipova | 3 | 2
PR | (Russia) V Zvonareva | 6 | 6
WC | (China) K Zhang | 3 | 5
PR | (Russia) V Diatchenko | 6 | 7

Semifinals
PR | (Russia) V Zvonareva | 6 | 6
PR | (Russia) V Diatchenko | 4 | 2

== Qualifying ==
=== Seeds ===
1. (Japan) Hiroko Kuwata (qualifying competition; lucky loser)
2. (China) Guo Hanyu (first round)
3. (Japan) Erika Sema (qualifying competition; lucky loser)
4. (China) Kang Jiaqi (qualifying competition)
5. (Thailand) Nicha Lertpitaksinchai (first round)
6. (China) You Xiaodi (qualified)
7. (Australia) Alison Bai (first round)
8. (China) Zhang Yuxuan (qualified)

=== Qualifiers ===
1. (China) Zhang Yuxuan
2. (China) Wang Meiling
3. (Indonesia) Beatrice Gumulya
4. (China) You Xiaodi

=== Lucky losers ===
1. (Japan) Hiroko Kuwata
2. (Japan) Erika Sema

=== Qualifying draw ===
==== First qualifier ====
First round
1 | (Japan) Hiroko Kuwata | 6 | 6
(Japan) Kotomi Takahata | 2 | 0
WC | (China) Wang Jue | 7^{7} | 2 | 0
8 | (China) Zhang Yuxuan | 6^{5} | 6 | 6

Qualifying competition
1 | (Japan) Hiroko Kuwata | 3 | 1
8 | (China) Zhang Yuxuan | 6 | 6

==== Second qualifier ====
First round
2/WC | (China) Guo Hanyu | 6 | 1 | 3
WC | (China) Jiang Xinyu | 1 | 6 | 6
WC | (China) Wang Meiling | 6 | 6
7 | (Australia) Alison Bai | 3 | 4

Qualifying competition
WC | (China) Jiang Xinyu | 2 | 4
WC | (China) Wang Meiling | 6 | 6

==== Third qualifier ====
First round
3 | (Japan) Erika Sema | 6 | 6
WC | (China) Meng Ran | 3 | 0
WC | (Indonesia) Beatrice Gumulya | 7^{10} | 6
5 | (Thailand) Nicha Lertpitaksinchai | 6^{8} | 2

Qualifying competition
3 | (Japan) Erika Sema | 1 | 6 | 5
WC | (Indonesia) Beatrice Gumulya | 6 | 0 | 7

==== Fourth qualifier ====
First round
4 | (China) Kang Jiaqi | 6 | 2 | 7^{7}
(Australia) Storm Sanders | 4 | 6 | 6^{5}
(China) Ye Qiuyu | 2 | 2
6 | (China) You Xiaodi | 6 | 6

Qualifying competition
4 | (China) Kang Jiaqi | 4 | 3
6 | (China) You Xiaodi | 6 | 6
