= 2017 Dalian Women's Tennis Open – Doubles =

Doubles
- 2017 Dalian Women's Tennis Open

Final
- Champion: (China) Lu Jingjing (China) You Xiaodi
- Runner-up: (China) Guo Hanyu (China) Ye Qiuyu
- Score: 7–6^{(7–2)}, 4–6, [10–5]

Events
Singles	Doubles
← 2016 ·	Dalian Women's Tennis Open	· 2018 →

Lee Ya-hsuan and Kotomi Takahata were the defending champions, but Lee chose not to participate. Takahata partnered Erika Sema, but lost in the first round to Han Xinyun and Jessica Moore.

Lu Jingjing and You Xiaodi won the title after defeating Guo Hanyu and Ye Qiuyu 7–6^{(7–2)}, 4–6, [10–5] in the final.

== Seeds ==
1. (Australia) Monique Adamczak / (Australia) Storm Sanders (first round)
2. (China) Han Xinyun / (Australia) Jessica Moore (quarterfinals)
3. (Slovenia) Dalila Jakupović / (Montenegro) Danka Kovinić (first round)
4. (China) Jiang Xinyu / (China) Lu Jiajing (quarterfinals)

== Draw ==
=== Key ===
- Q = Qualifier
- WC = Wild card
- LL = Lucky loser
- Alt = Alternate
- SE = Special exempt
- PR = Protected ranking
- ITF = ITF entry
- JE = Junior exempt
- w/o = Walkover
- r = Retired
- d = Defaulted
- SR = Special ranking

First round
1	(Australia) M Adamczak (Australia) S Sanders	4	4
(United States) J Cako (Uzbekistan) S Sharipova	6	6
(Australia) A Bai (Indonesia) J Rompies	3	6^{5}
(Indonesia) B Gumulya (Thailand) N Lertpitaksinchai	6	7^{7}
4	(China) X Jiang (China) Jia Lu	6	6
(Chinese Taipei) C-w Chan (India) P Thombare	3	2
(China) J Kang (China) F Liu	2	3
(China) Jin Lu (China) X You	6	6
(Thailand) Pe Plipuech (Japan) R Sawayanagi	3	3
(China) X Gao (China) F Xun	6	6
(Ukraine) K Kozlova (Australia) Ar Rodionova	6	6
3	(Slovenia) D Jakupović (Montenegro) D Kovinić	3	3
(China) H Guo (China) Q Ye	6	6
(China) Meng Ran (China) Zang Jiaxue	1	3
(Japan) E Sema (Japan) K Takahata	3	5
2	(China) X Han (Australia) J Moore	6	7

Quarterfinals
(United States) J Cako (Uzbekistan) S Sharipova	7^{9}	6
(Indonesia) B Gumulya (Thailand) N Lertpitaksinchai	6^{7}	3
4	(China) X Jiang (China) Jia Lu	4	3
(China) Jin Lu (China) X You	6	6
(China) X Gao (China) F Xun	w/o
(Ukraine) K Kozlova (Australia) Ar Rodionova
(China) H Guo (China) Q Ye	6	6
2	(China) X Han (Australia) J Moore	2	0

Semifinals
(United States) J Cako (Uzbekistan) S Sharipova	7	1	[3]
(China) Jin Lu (China) X You	5	6	[10]
(China) X Gao (China) F Xun	6^{7}	4
(China) H Guo (China) Q Ye	7^{9}	6

Final
(China) Jin Lu (China) X You	7^{7}	4	[10]
(China) H Guo (China) Q Ye	6^{2}	6	[5]
