= Dalian Women's Tennis Open =

Defunct tennis tournament
- Tour: WTA 125 tournaments
- Founded: 2015; 10 years ago
- Abolished: 2017; 8 years ago
- Location: Dalian, China
- Surface: Hard
- Draw: 32M/16Q/16D
- Prize money: $125,000 (2017)

The Dalian Women's Tennis Open was a tournament for professional female tennis players played on outdoor hardcourts. It was classified as a WTA 125 tournament which was first held in Dalian, China, in 2015.

== Past finals ==
=== Singles ===
Year	Champion	Runner-up	Score
2017	(Ukraine) Kateryna Kozlova	(Russia) Vera Zvonareva	6–4, 6–2
2016	(Czech Republic) Kristýna Plíšková	(Japan) Misa Eguchi	7–5, 4–6, 2–5 ret.
2015	(China) Zheng Saisai	(Israel) Julia Glushko	2–6, 6–1, 7–5
↑ WTA 125 event ↑

=== Doubles ===
Year	Champions	Runners-up	Score
2017	(China) Lu Jingjing (China) You Xiaodi	(China) Guo Hanyu (China) Ye Qiuyu	7–6^{(7–2)}, 4–6, [10–5]
2016	(Chinese Taipei) Lee Ya-hsuan (Japan) Kotomi Takahata	(Thailand) Nicha Lertpitaksinchai (Indonesia) Jessy Rompies	6–2, 6–1
2015	(China) Zhang Kailin (China) Zheng Saisai	(Chinese Taipei) Chan Chin-wei (Croatia) Darija Jurak	6–3, 6–4
↑ WTA 125 event ↑
