= 2015 WTA 125K series =

Details
- Duration: July 27, 2015 – November 29, 2015
- Edition: 4th
- Tournaments: 6

Achievements (singles)

The 2015 WTA 125K series was the secondary professional tennis circuit organised by the Women's Tennis Association. The [WTA 125K series calendar consists of six tournaments, each with a total prize fund of $125,000. After 2014, both the Suzhou, and Ningbo events folded, with Suzhou being replaced by a tournament in Dalian, and new events starting in Carlsbad and Hua Hin.

== Schedule ==
Week of	Tournament	Champions	Runners-up	Semifinalists	Quarterfinalists
July 27	Jiangxi International Women's Tennis Open; Nanchang, China $125,000 – hard – 32S/16Q/16D; Singles – Doubles	(Serbia) Jelena Janković; 6–3, 7–6^{(8–6)}	(Chinese Taipei) Chang Kai-chen	(China) Han Xinyun (China) Lu Jiajing	(China) Duan Yingying (China) Liu Fangzhou (China) Wang Yafan (South Korea) Han Na-lae
July 27	Jiangxi International Women's Tennis Open; Nanchang, China $125,000 – hard – 32S/16Q/16D; Singles – Doubles	(Chinese Taipei) Chang Kai-chen (China) Zheng Saisai; 6–3, 4–6, [10–3]	(Chinese Taipei) Chan Chin-wei (China) Wang Yafan	(China) Han Xinyun (China) Lu Jiajing	(China) Duan Yingying (China) Liu Fangzhou (China) Wang Yafan (South Korea) Han Na-lae
September 7	Dalian Women's Tennis Open; Dalian, China $125,000 – hard – 32S/16Q/16D; Singles – Doubles	(China) Zheng Saisai; 2–6, 6–1, 7–5	(Israel) Julia Glushko	(China) Wang Qiang (Croatia) Petra Martić	(Chinese Taipei) Chang Kai-chen (China) Liu Fangzhou (Spain) Sara Sorribes Tormo (China) Wang Yafan
September 7	Dalian Women's Tennis Open; Dalian, China $125,000 – hard – 32S/16Q/16D; Singles – Doubles	(China) Zhang Kailin (China) Zheng Saisai; 6–3, 6–4	(Chinese Taipei) Chan Chin-wei (Croatia) Darija Jurak	(China) Wang Qiang (Croatia) Petra Martić	(Chinese Taipei) Chang Kai-chen (China) Liu Fangzhou (Spain) Sara Sorribes Tormo (China) Wang Yafan
November 9	Open de Limoges; Limoges, France $125,000 – hard (indoor) – 32S/16Q/8D; Singles – Doubles	(France) Caroline Garcia; 6–1, 6–3	(United States) Louisa Chirico	(Czech Republic) Kateřina Siniaková (Italy) Francesca Schiavone	(Germany) Anna-Lena Friedsam (Croatia) Donna Vekić (Ukraine) Kateryna Kozlova (Russia) Margarita Gasparyan
November 9	Open de Limoges; Limoges, France $125,000 – hard (indoor) – 32S/16Q/8D; Singles – Doubles	(Czech Republic) Barbora Krejčíková (Luxembourg) Mandy Minella; 1–6, 7–5, [10–6]	(Russia) Margarita Gasparyan (Georgia (country)) Oksana Kalashnikova	(Czech Republic) Kateřina Siniaková (Italy) Francesca Schiavone	(Germany) Anna-Lena Friedsam (Croatia) Donna Vekić (Ukraine) Kateryna Kozlova (Russia) Margarita Gasparyan
November 9	Hua Hin Championships; Hua Hin, Thailand $125,000 – hard – 32S/16Q/16D; Singles – Doubles	(Kazakhstan) Yaroslava Shvedova; 6–4, 6–7^{(8–10)}, 6–4	(Japan) Naomi Osaka	(Japan) Nao Hibino (China) Wang Qiang	(China) Liu Fangzhou (Thailand) Luksika Kumkhum (China) Duan Yingying (Chinese Taipei) Hsieh Su-wei
November 9	Hua Hin Championships; Hua Hin, Thailand $125,000 – hard – 32S/16Q/16D; Singles – Doubles	(China) Liang Chen (China) Wang Yafan; 6–3, 6–4	(Thailand) Varatchaya Wongteanchai (China) Yang Zhaoxuan	(Japan) Nao Hibino (China) Wang Qiang	(China) Liu Fangzhou (Thailand) Luksika Kumkhum (China) Duan Yingying (Chinese Taipei) Hsieh Su-wei
November 16	OEC Taipei WTA Challenger; Taipei, Taiwan $125,000 – carpet (indoor) – 32S/8Q/16D; Singles – Doubles	(Hungary) Tímea Babos; 7–5, 6–3	(Japan) Misaki Doi	(Russia) Evgeniya Rodina (Belgium) Kirsten Flipkens	(Thailand) Luksika Kumkhum (China) Liu Chang (Switzerland) Stefanie Vögele (Kazakhstan) Yaroslava Shvedova
November 16	OEC Taipei WTA Challenger; Taipei, Taiwan $125,000 – carpet (indoor) – 32S/8Q/16D; Singles – Doubles	(Japan) Kanae Hisami (Japan) Kotomi Takahata; 6–1, 6–2	(Russia) Marina Melnikova (Belgium) Elise Mertens	(Russia) Evgeniya Rodina (Belgium) Kirsten Flipkens	(Thailand) Luksika Kumkhum (China) Liu Chang (Switzerland) Stefanie Vögele (Kazakhstan) Yaroslava Shvedova
November 23	Carlsbad Classic; Carlsbad, USA $125,000 – hard – 32S/8Q/8D; Singles – Doubles	(Belgium) Yanina Wickmayer; 6–3, 7–6^{(7–4)}	(United States) Nicole Gibbs	(Greece) Maria Sakkari (United States) Jennifer Brady	(United States) Catherine Bellis (United States) Samantha Crawford (Russia) Marina Melnikova (Germany) Tatjana Maria
November 23	Carlsbad Classic; Carlsbad, USA $125,000 – hard – 32S/8Q/8D; Singles – Doubles	(Brazil) Gabriela Cé (Paraguay) Verónica Cepede Royg; 1–6, 6–4, [10–8]	(Georgia (country)) Oksana Kalashnikova (Germany) Tatjana Maria	(Greece) Maria Sakkari (United States) Jennifer Brady	(United States) Catherine Bellis (United States) Samantha Crawford (Russia) Marina Melnikova (Germany) Tatjana Maria

== Statistical information ==
These tables present the number of singles (S) and doubles (D) titles won by each player and each nation during the season. The players/nations are sorted by: 1) total number of titles (a doubles title won by two players representing the same nation counts as only one win for the nation); 2) a singles > doubles hierarchy; 3) alphabetical order (by family names for players).

To avoid confusion and double counting, these tables should be updated only after an event is completed.

=== Titles won by player ===
Total	Player	S	D	S	D
3	Zheng Saisai (CHN)	●	● ●	1	2
1	Tímea Babos (HUN)	●		1	0
1	Caroline Garcia (FRA)	●		1	0
1	Jelena Janković (SRB)	●		1	0
1	Yaroslava Shvedova (KAZ)	●		1	0
1	Yanina Wickmayer (BEL)	●		1	0
1	Gabriela Cé (BRA)		●	0	1
1	Verónica Cepede Royg (PAR)		●	0	1
1	Chang Kai-chen (TPE)		●	0	1
1	Kanae Hisami (JPN)		●	0	1
1	Barbora Krejčíková (CZE)		●	0	1
1	Liang Chen (CHN)		●	0	1
1	Mandy Minella (LUX)		●	0	1
1	Kotomi Takahata (JPN)		●	0	1
1	Wang Yafan (CHN)		●	0	1
1	Zhang Kailin (CHN)		●	0	1

=== Titles won by nation ===
Total	Nation	S	D
4	China (CHN)	1	3
1	Belgium (BEL)	1	0
1	France (FRA)	1	0
1	Hungary (HUN)	1	0
1	Kazakhstan (KAZ)	1	0
1	Serbia (SRB)	1	0
1	Brazil (BRA)	0	1
1	Chinese Taipei (TPE)	0	1
1	Czech Republic (CZE)	0	1
1	Japan (JPN)	0	1
1	Luxembourg (LUX)	0	1
1	Paraguay (PAR)	0	1

== Points distribution ==
Event	W	F	SF	QF	R16	R32	Q	Q2	Q1
Singles	160	95	57	29	15	1	6	4	1
Doubles	160	95	57	29	1	—	—	—	—
