= Hua Hin Challenger =

Tennis tournament in Thailand

Defunct tennis tournament
- Event name: Hua Hin Challenger
- Tour: WTA 125K series, ATP Challenger Tour
- Founded: 2015
- Abolished: 2017
- Location: Hua Hin, Thailand
- Surface: Hard - outdoors

The Hua Hin Challenger was a tennis tournament for professional male and female tennis players played on outdoor hard courts. The event was classified as a $125,000 ATP Challenger Tour and WTA 125K series tournament and was held in Hua Hin District, Thailand, in 2015 and 2017.

== Past finals ==
=== Men's singles ===
Year	Champion	Runner-up	Score
2015	(Japan) Yūichi Sugita	(France) Stéphane Robert	6–2, 1–6, 6–3
2017	(Australia) John Millman	(Australia) Andrew Whittington	6–2, 6–2

=== Women's singles ===
Year	Champion	Runner-up	Score
2015	(Kazakhstan) Yaroslava Shvedova	(Japan) Naomi Osaka	6–4, 6–7^{(8-10)}, 6–4
2017	(Switzerland) Belinda Bencic	(Chinese Taipei) Hsieh Su-wei	6–3, 6–4

=== Men's doubles ===
Year	Champions	Runners-up	Score
2015	(Chinese Taipei) Lee Hsin-han (Chinese Taipei) Lu Yen-hsun	(Germany) Andre Begemann (India) Purav Raja	walkover
2017	(Thailand) Sanchai Ratiwatana (Thailand) Sonchat Ratiwatana	(United States) Austin Krajicek (United States) Jackson Withrow	6–4, 5–7, [10–5]

=== Women's doubles ===
Year	Champions	Runners-up	Score
2015	(China) Liang Chen (China) Wang Yafan	(Thailand) Varatchaya Wongteanchai (China) Yang Zhaoxuan	6–3, 6–3
2017	(China) Duan Yingying (China) Wang Yafan (2)	(Slovenia) Dalila Jakupović (Russia) Irina Khromacheva	6–3, 6–3
