= 2016 OEC Taipei WTA Challenger =

- Date: 14–20 November
- Edition: 9th
- Category: WTA 125K series
- Prize money: $115,000
- Surface: Hard (indoor)
- Location: Taipei, Taiwan

Champions

Singles
- (Russia) Evgeniya Rodina

Doubles
- (Russia) Natela Dzalamidze / (Russia) Veronika Kudermetova
← 2015 ·	OEC Taipei WTA Challenger	· 2017 →

The 2016 OEC Taipei WTA Challenger was a professional tennis tournament played on indoor hard courts. It was the 9th edition of the tournament and part of the 2016 WTA 125K series, offering a total of $115,000 in prize money. It took place in Taipei, Taiwan, on 14–20 November 2016.

== Singles main draw entrants ==
=== Seeds ===
Country	Player	Rank^{1}	Seed
~~FRA~~	~~Kristina Mladenovic~~	~~42~~	~~1~~
GBR	Naomi Broady	88	2
GRE	Maria Sakkari	89	3
RUS	Irina Khromacheva	93	4
JPN	Risa Ozaki	94	5
RUS	Evgeniya Rodina	104	6
ESP	Sara Sorribes Tormo	107	7
NZL	Marina Erakovic	114	8
CHN	Wang Yafan	117	9

- ^{1} Rankings as of 7 November 2016.

=== Other entrants ===
The following player received a wildcard into the singles main draw:

- (Russia) Vitalia Diatchenko
- (Chinese Taipei) Hsu Chieh-yu
- (Chinese Taipei) Hsu Ching-wen
- (Chinese Taipei) Lee Ya-hsuan
- ~~(France) Kristina Mladenovic~~ (withdrew)

The following players received entry from the qualifying draw:

- (Australia) Ashleigh Barty
- (Chinese Taipei) Lee Pei-chi
- (Japan) Junri Namigata
- (Thailand) Varatchaya Wongteanchai

The following player received entry by a lucky loser spot:

- (Japan) Kyōka Okamura

== Doubles entrants ==
=== Seeds ===
Country	Player	Country	Player	Rank^{1}	Seed
TPE	Chan Hao-ching	TPE	Chan Yung-jan	24	1
JPN	Eri Hozumi	JPN	Miyu Kato	112	2
GBR	Naomi Broady	TUR	İpek Soylu	143	3
AUS	Jessica Moore	THA	Varatchaya Wongteanchai	169	4

- ^{1} Rankings as of 7 November 2016.

=== Other entrants ===
The following pair received a wildcard into the doubles main draw:

- (Chinese Taipei) Cho I-hsuan / (Germany) Tatjana Maria

== Champions ==
=== Singles ===
- (Russia) Evgeniya Rodina def. (Chinese Taipei) Chang Kai-chen, 6–4, 6–3

=== Doubles ===
- (Russia) Natela Dzalamidze / (Russia) Veronika Kudermetova def. (Chinese Taipei) Chang Kai-chen / (Chinese Taipei) Chuang Chia-jung, 4–6, 6–3, [10–5]
