= 2015 Jiangxi International Women's Tennis Open =

- Date: 27 July – 2 August
- Edition: 2nd
- Category: WTA 125K series
- Draw: 32S / 16D
- Prize money: $125,000
- Surface: Hard / outdoor
- Location: Nanchang, China

Champions

Singles
- (Serbia) Jelena Janković

Doubles
- (Chinese Taipei) Chang Kai-chen / (China) Zheng Saisai
- Jiangxi International Women's Tennis Open

The 2015 Zhonghong Jiangxi International Women's Tennis Open was a professional women's tennis tournament played on outdoor hard courts. It is the second edition of the tournament which was part of the 2015 WTA 125K series and took place in Nanchang, China, from 27 July through 2 August 2015. First-seeded Jelena Janković won the singles title.

== Finals ==
=== Singles ===
- (Serbia) Jelena Janković defeated (Chinese Taipei) Chang Kai-chen 6–3, 7–6^{(8–6)}

=== Doubles ===
- (Chinese Taipei) Chang Kai-chen / (China) Zheng Saisai defeated (Chinese Taipei) Chan Chin-wei / (China) Wang Yafan 6–3, 4–6, [10–3]

== Singles draw entrants ==
=== Seeds ===
Country	Player	Rank^{1}	Seed
SRB	Jelena Janković	25	1
CHN	Zheng Saisai	66	2
CHN	Wang Qiang	102	3
TPE	Hsieh Su-wei	109	4
CHN	Duan Yingying	113	5
THA	Luksika Kumkhum	122	6
CHN	Yafan Wang	125	7
CHN	Liu Fangzhou	144	8

- ^{1} Rankings are as of 20 July 2015.

=== Other entrants ===
The following players received wildcards into the singles main draw:

- (China) Gao Xinyu
- (Serbia) Jelena Janković
- (China) Liang Chen
- (China) Zhang Ying
- (China) Zheng Wushuang

The following players received entry from the qualifying draw:

- (Australia) Alison Bai
- (Japan) Makoto Ninomiya
- (Japan) Kyōka Okamura
- (Japan) Erika Sema

== Doubles draw entrants ==
=== Seeds ===
Country	Player	Country	Player	Rank	Seed
TPE	Chan Chin-wei	CHN	Wang Yafan	163	1
CHN	Han Xinyun	CHN	Zhang Kailin	191	2
TPE	Chang Kai-chen	CHN	Zheng Saisai	258	3
CHN	Liang Chen	HKG	Zhang Ling	304	4
