= Thailand Open =

Thailand Open may refer to one of several sporting tournaments:

- Thailand Open (badminton)
- Thailand Open (golf)
- Thailand Open (ATP) – a defunct tournament for professional male tennis players
- Thailand Open (Pattaya) (1991–2015) – a defunct tournament for professional female tennis players
- Bangkok Open (2005–2007) – a defunct tournament for professional female tennis players
- Hua Hin Championships (2019–2024) – a defunct tournament for professional female tennis players
- Hua Hin Challenger (2015–2017) – a defunct Challenge-level tournament for professional male and female tennis players

== See also ==
- Thailand Masters (snooker)
- Thailand Masters (badminton)
