= 2016 OEC Taipei WTA Challenger – Doubles =

Doubles
- 2016 OEC Taipei WTA Challenger

Final
- Champions: (Russia) Natela Dzalamidze (Russia) Veronika Kudermetova
- Runners-up: (Chinese Taipei) Chang Kai-chen (Chinese Taipei) Chuang Chia-jung
- Score: 4–6, 6–3, [10–5]

Events
| Singles | Doubles |
- OEC Taipei WTA Challenger

Kanae Hisami and Kotomi Takahata were the defending champions, but Hisami chose not to participate. Takahata partnered Jessy Rompies, but lost in the first round to Ankita Raina and Emily Webley-Smith.

Natela Dzalamidze and Veronika Kudermetova won the title, defeating Chang Kai-chen and Chuang Chia-jung in the final, 4–6, 6–3, [10–5].

== Seeds ==
1. (Chinese Taipei) Chan Hao-ching / (Chinese Taipei) Chan Yung-jan (semifinals)
2. (Japan) Eri Hozumi / (Japan) Miyu Kato (first round)
3. (United Kingdom) Naomi Broady / (Turkey) İpek Soylu (semifinals)
4. (Australia) Jessica Moore / (Thailand) Varatchaya Wongteanchai (first round)

== Draw ==
Key

- Q = Qualifier
- WC = Wild card
- LL = Lucky loser
- Alt = Alternate
- ITF = ITF entry
- PR = Protected ranking
- SR = Special ranking
- SE = Special exempt
- JE = Junior exempt
- JR = Junior Accelerator Programme entrant
- CO = College Accelerator Programme entrant
- NG = Next Gen Accelerator Program entrant
- w/o = Walkover
- r = Retired
- d = Defaulted

First round
1 | (Chinese Taipei) H-c Chan (Chinese Taipei) Y-j Chan | 6 | 6
(Russia) I Khromacheva (Japan) H Kuwata | 1 | 1
(Indonesia) J Rompies (Japan) K Takahata | 5 | 2
(India) A Raina (United Kingdom) E Webley-Smith | 7 | 6
4 | (Australia) J Moore (Thailand) Vara Wongteanchai | 0 | 5
(Chinese Taipei) K-c Chang (Chinese Taipei) C-j Chuang | 6 | 7
(Chinese Taipei) C-y Hsu (Slovenia) D Jakupović | 6^{5} | 1
(Belarus) O Govortsova (Russia) E Rodina | 7^{7} | 6
(Japan) J Namigata (Thailand) Pe Plipuech | 6^{4} | 6 | [10]
(Chinese Taipei) C-w Chan (Japan) R Sawayanagi | 7^{7} | 3 | [12]
WC | (Chinese Taipei) I-h Cho (Germany) T Maria | 6 | 3 | [8]
3 | (United Kingdom) N Broady (Turkey) İ Soylu | 4 | 6 | [10]
Alt | (Chinese Taipei) P-c Lee (Thailand) N Lertpitaksinchai | 4 | 4
(Chinese Taipei) C-w Hsu (Chinese Taipei) Y-h Lee | 6 | 6
(Russia) N Dzalamidze (Russia) V Kudermetova | 6 | 6
2 | (Japan) E Hozumi (Japan) M Kato | 2 | 4

Quarterfinals
1 | (Chinese Taipei) H-c Chan (Chinese Taipei) Y-j Chan | 6 | 6
(India) A Raina (United Kingdom) E Webley-Smith | 2 | 3
(Chinese Taipei) K-c Chang (Chinese Taipei) C-j Chuang | 6 | 6
(Belarus) O Govortsova (Russia) E Rodina | 3 | 3
(Chinese Taipei) C-w Chan (Japan) R Sawayanagi | 2 | 4
3 | (United Kingdom) N Broady (Turkey) İ Soylu | 6 | 6
(Chinese Taipei) C-w Hsu (Chinese Taipei) Y-h Lee | 4 | 2
(Russia) N Dzalamidze (Russia) V Kudermetova | 6 | 6

Semifinals
1 | (Chinese Taipei) H-c Chan (Chinese Taipei) Y-j Chan | 6 | 4 | [4]
(Chinese Taipei) K-c Chang (Chinese Taipei) C-j Chuang | 2 | 6 | [10]
3 | (United Kingdom) N Broady (Turkey) İ Soylu | 3 | 2
(Russia) N Dzalamidze (Russia) V Kudermetova | 6 | 6

Final
(Chinese Taipei) K-c Chang (Chinese Taipei) C-j Chuang | 6 | 3 | [5]
(Russia) N Dzalamidze (Russia) V Kudermetova | 4 | 6 | [10]
