= 2015 Jiangxi International Women's Tennis Open – Doubles =

Doubles
- 2015 Jiangxi International Women's Tennis Open

Final
- Champions: (Chinese Taipei) Chang Kai-chen (China) Zheng Saisai
- Runners-up: (Chinese Taipei) Chan Chin-wei (China) Wang Yafan
- Score: 6–3, 4–6, [10–3]

Details
- Draw: 16
- Seeds: 8

Events
Singles	Doubles
- Jiangxi International Women's Tennis Open

Chuang Chia-jung and Junri Namigata were the defending champions, but Chuang chose not to participate. Namigata partnered Erika Sema, but lost in the first round to Miyu Kato and Kotomi Takahata.

== Seeds ==
1. (Chinese Taipei) Chan Chin-wei / (China) Wang Yafan (final)
2. (China) Han Xinyun / (China) Zhang Kailin (semifinals)
3. (Chinese Taipei) Chang Kai-chen / (China) Zheng Saisai (champions)
4. (China) Liang Chen / (Hong Kong) Zhang Ling (first round)

== Draw ==
Key

- Q = Qualifier
- WC = Wild card
- LL = Lucky loser
- Alt = Alternate
- ITF = ITF entry
- PR = Protected ranking
- SR = Special ranking
- SE = Special exempt
- JE = Junior exempt
- JR = Junior Accelerator Programme entrant
- CO = College Accelerator Programme entrant
- NG = Next Gen Accelerator Program entrant
- w/o = Walkover
- r = Retired
- d = Defaulted

First round
1	(Chinese Taipei) C-w Chan (China) Y Wang	6	6
(Australia) Ar Rodionova (Uzbekistan) S Sharipova	3	1
(South Korea) N-l Han (South Korea) S-j Jang	6	6
(Russia) E Bychkova (India) A Raina	1	2
4	(China) C Liang (Hong Kong) L Zhang	2	6	[12]
(Australia) A Bai (Chinese Taipei) Y-h Lee	6	2	[14]
(Japan) M Kato (Japan) K Takahata	6	6^{5}	[10]
(Japan) J Namigata (Japan) E Sema	3	7^{7}	[7]
(Japan) M Ninomiya (Japan) R Sawayanagi	3	4
(Japan) M Ayukawa (Japan) K Okamura	6	6
(China) C Liu (China) J Lu	5	1
3	(Chinese Taipei) K-c Chang (China) S Zheng	7	6
(China) X Gao (China) X You	6	6
(Thailand) K Buayam (Thailand) L Kumkhum	1	1
(China) F Xun (China) Yi Zhang	3	5
2	(China) X Han (China) K Zhang	6	7

Quarterfinals
1	(Chinese Taipei) C-w Chan (China) Y Wang	7^{11}	7^{7}
(South Korea) N-l Han (South Korea) S-j Jang	6^{9}	6^{3}
(Australia) A Bai (Chinese Taipei) Y-h Lee	3	0
(Japan) M Kato (Japan) K Takahata	6	6
(Japan) M Ayukawa (Japan) K Okamura	2	6^{3}
3	(Chinese Taipei) K-c Chang (China) S Zheng	6	7^{7}
(China) X Gao (China) X You	4	6^{4}
2	(China) X Han (China) K Zhang	6	7^{7}

Semifinals
1	(Chinese Taipei) C-w Chan (China) Y Wang	6	6
(Japan) M Kato (Japan) K Takahata	2	4
3	(Chinese Taipei) K-c Chang (China) S Zheng	6^{5}	6	[10]
2	(China) X Han (China) K Zhang	7^{7}	4	[8]

Final
1	(Chinese Taipei) C-w Chan (China) Y Wang	3	6	[3]
3	(Chinese Taipei) K-c Chang (China) S Zheng	6	4	[10]
