= 2015 Hua Hin Championships =

- Date: 2–8 November (ATP); 9 – 15 November (WTA)
- Edition: 1st
- Draw: 32S / 16D
- Prize money: $125,000
- Surface: Hard, indoor
- Location: Hua Hin, Thailand

Champions

Men's singles
- (Japan) Yūichi Sugita

Women's singles
- (Kazakhstan) Yaroslava Shvedova

Men's doubles
- (Chinese Taipei) Lee Hsin-han / (Chinese Taipei) Lu Yen-hsun

Women's doubles
- (China) Liang Chen / (China) Wang Yafan
Hua Hin Championships	· 2017 →

The 2015 Hua Hin Championships was a professional tennis tournament played on indoor hard courts. It was the first edition of the tournament, which was part of the 2015 ATP Challenger Tour and part of 2015 WTA 125K series. It took place in Hua Hin, Thailand between 2 November to 8 November 2015 for the men's tournament, and between 9 November to 15 November 2015 for the women's tournament.

== ATP singles main-draw entrants ==
=== Seeds ===
Country	Player	Rank^{1}	Seed
TPE	Lu Yen-hsun	77	1
RUS	Evgeny Donskoy	100	2
IND	Yuki Bhambri	105	3
ISR	Dudi Sela	113	4
JPN	Tatsuma Ito	118	5
ESP	Adrián Menéndez Maceiras	140	6
EST	Jürgen Zopp	147	7
JPN	Yoshihito Nishioka	152	8

- ^{1} Rankings are as of 26 October 2015.

=== Other entrants ===
The following players received wildcards into the singles main draw:

- (Thailand) Puriwat Chatpatcharoen
- (Thailand) Pruchya Isaro
- (Thailand) Warit Sornbutnark
- (Thailand) Kittipong Wachiramanowong

The following player received entry into the singles main draw with a protected ranking:

- (Israel) Amir Weintraub

The following players received entry from the qualifying draw:

- (Italy) Riccardo Ghedin
- (Thailand) Jirat Navasirisomboon
- (France) Stéphane Robert
- (France) Laurent Rochette

The following player received entry as a lucky loser:

- (Japan) Toshihide Matsui

=== Withdrawals ===
- (Croatia) Matija Pecotic →replaced by (Japan) Toshihide Matsui

=== Retirements ===
- (India) Yuki Bhambri (right elbow injury)
- (China) Yan Bai (stomach upset)
- (Chinese Taipei) Ti Chen (neck injury)

== ATP doubles main-draw entrants ==
=== Seeds ===
Team	Rank^{1}	Seed
(Germany) Andre Begemann (India) Purav Raja	170	1
(Chinese Taipei) Lee Hsin-han (Chinese Taipei) Lu Yen-hsun	282	2
(China) Gong Maoxin (Chinese Taipei) Peng Hsien-yin	287	3
(United States) James Cerretani (Chinese Taipei) Ti Chen	303	4

=== Other entrants ===
The following teams received wildcards into the doubles main draw:

- (United States) John Paul Fruttero / (Thailand) Kittipong Wachiramanowong
- (Thailand) Puriwat Chatpatcharoen / (Thailand) Warit Sornbutnark
- (Thailand) Pruchya Isaro / (Thailand) Nuttanon Kadchapanan

The following teams received entry by a protected ranking:

- (Germany) Peter Gojowczyk / (Israel) Amir Weintraub

=== Withdrawals ===
During the tournament

- (Germany) Andre Begemann / (India) Purav Raja (unspecified)

=== Retirements ===
- (China) Gong Maoxin (dizziness)

== WTA singles main-draw entrants ==
=== Seeds ===
Country	Player	Rank^{1}	Seed
JPN	Misaki Doi	60	1
CHN	Zheng Saisai	75	2
JPN	Nao Hibino	79	3
KAZ	Yaroslava Shvedova	82	4
JPN	Kurumi Nara	83	5
RUS	Evgeniya Rodina	84	6
HUN	Tímea Babos	85	7
BEL	Kirsten Flipkens	94	8

- ^{1} Rankings are as of 2 November 2015.

=== Other entrants ===
The following players received wildcards into the singles main draw:

- (Thailand) Kamonwan Buayam
- (Thailand) Noppawan Lertcheewakarn
- (Thailand) Bunyawi Thamchaiwat
- (Thailand) Varatchaya Wongteanchai

The following players received entry from the qualifying draw:

- (Uzbekistan) Akgul Amanmuradova
- (Japan) Shuko Aoyama
- (China) Liu Chang
- (China) Lu Jiajing

== WTA doubles main-draw entrants ==
=== Seeds ===
Team	Rank^{1}	Seed
(China) Liang Chen (China) Wang Yafan	93	1
(Japan) Shuko Aoyama (Japan) Makoto Ninomiya	171	2
(China) Han Xinyun (China) Zhang Kailin	198	3
(Chinese Taipei) Chan Chin-wei (Russia) Ksenia Lykina	262	4

=== Other entrants ===
The following team received wildcards into the doubles main draw:

- (Thailand) Kamonwan Buayam / (Thailand) Nudnida Luangnam

== Champions ==
=== Men's singles ===
- (Japan) Yūichi Sugita def. (France) Stéphane Robert 6–2, 1–6, 6–3

=== Men's doubles ===
- (Chinese Taipei) Lee Hsin-han / (Chinese Taipei) Lu Yen-hsun def. (Germany) Andre Begemann / (India) Purav Raja walkover

=== Women's singles ===
- (Kazakhstan) Yaroslava Shvedova def. (Japan) Naomi Osaka 6–4, 6–7^{(8–10)}, 6–4

=== Women's doubles ===
- (China) Liang Chen / (China) Wang Yafan def. (Thailand) Varatchaya Wongteanchai / (China) Yang Zhaoxuan 6–3, 6–4
