= 2015 OEC Taipei WTA Challenger – Doubles =

Doubles
- 2015 OEC Taipei WTA Challenger

Final
- Champions: (Japan) Kanae Hisami (Japan) Kotomi Takahata
- Runners-up: (Russia) Marina Melnikova (Belgium) Elise Mertens
- Score: 6–1, 6–2

Events
Singles	Doubles
- OEC Taipei WTA Challenger

Chan Hao-ching and Chan Yung-jan were the defending champions, but they chose not to participate this year.

Kanae Hisami and Kotomi Takahata won the title, defeating Marina Melnikova and Elise Mertens in the final, 6–1, 6–2.

== Seeds ==
1. (China) Han Xinyun / (China) Zhang Kailin (semifinals)
2. (Chinese Taipei) Chan Chin-wei / (Japan) Junri Namigata (semifinals)
3. (Russia) Marina Melnikova / (Belgium) Elise Mertens (final)
4. (France) Amandine Hesse / (Japan) Hiroko Kuwata (quarterfinals)

== Draw ==
Key

- Q = Qualifier
- WC = Wild card
- LL = Lucky loser
- Alt = Alternate
- ITF = ITF entry
- PR = Protected ranking
- SR = Special ranking
- SE = Special exempt
- JE = Junior exempt
- JR = Junior Accelerator Programme entrant
- CO = College Accelerator Programme entrant
- NG = Next Gen Accelerator Program entrant
- w/o = Walkover
- r = Retired
- d = Defaulted

First round
1	(China) X Han (China) K Zhang	6	6
WC	(Chinese Taipei) Y-l Chen (Chinese Taipei) T-f Juan	2	4
(Chinese Taipei) I-h Cho (Chinese Taipei) C-y Hsu	3	6	[8]
(Chinese Taipei) C-w Hsu (India) A Raina	6	4	[10]
4	(France) A Hesse (Japan) H Kuwata	6	6
(Chinese Taipei) Y-hsu Lee (China) C Liu	4	4
(Japan) K Hisami (Japan) K Takahata	6	6
(Chinese Taipei) Y-hsi Lee (Chinese Taipei) Y-y Pai	0	1
(Switzerland) S Vögele (Hong Kong) L Zhang	6	6^{2}	[6]
(Thailand) N Lertpitaksinchai (Thailand) Pe Plipuech	2	7^{7}	[10]
(Thailand) L Kumkhum (China) J Lu	6	1	[7]
3	(Russia) M Melnikova (Belgium) E Mertens	0	6	[10]
WC	(Chinese Taipei) P-c Lee (Chinese Taipei) C-h Yang	4	6	[10]
WC	(Chinese Taipei) Y-t Cho (Chinese Taipei) F-h Wu	6	3	[4]
WC	(Chinese Taipei) Y Lee (Chinese Taipei) H-y Shih	0	0
2	(Chinese Taipei) C-w Chan (Japan) J Namigata	6	6

Quarterfinals
1	(China) X Han (China) K Zhang	6	6
(Chinese Taipei) C-w Hsu (India) A Raina	2	2
4	(France) A Hesse (Japan) H Kuwata	1	6	[8]
(Japan) K Hisami (Japan) K Takahata	6	3	[10]
(Thailand) N Lertpitaksinchai (Thailand) Pe Plipuech	4	7^{7}	[7]
3	(Russia) M Melnikova (Belgium) E Mertens	6	6^{4}	[10]
WC	(Chinese Taipei) P-c Lee (Chinese Taipei) C-h Yang	1	0
2	(Chinese Taipei) C-w Chan (Japan) J Namigata	6	6

Semifinals
1	(China) X Han (China) K Zhang	6	5	[6]
(Japan) K Hisami (Japan) K Takahata	2	7	[10]
3	(Russia) M Melnikova (Belgium) E Mertens	5	6	[10]
2	(Chinese Taipei) C-w Chan (Japan) J Namigata	7	4	[4]

Final
(Japan) K Hisami (Japan) K Takahata	6	6
3	(Russia) M Melnikova (Belgium) E Mertens	1	2
