= 2015 Carlsbad Classic =

- Date: 23–29 November
- Edition: 34th (1st as WTA 125k event)
- Category: WTA 125K series
- Prize money: $115,000
- Surface: Hard / outdoor
- Location: Carlsbad, California, United States
- Venue: Park Hyatt Resort Aviara

Champions

Singles
- (Belgium) Yanina Wickmayer

Doubles
- (Brazil) Gabriela Cé / (Paraguay) Verónica Cepede Royg
- Southern California Open

The 2015 Carlsbad Classic was a professional women's tennis tournament played on outdoor hard courts. It was the first edition of the tournament as part of the 2015 WTA 125K series. It took place in Carlsbad, California, United States, on 23–29 November 2015. First-seeded Yanina Wickmayer won the singles title.

== Finals ==
=== Singles ===
- (Belgium) Yanina Wickmayer defeated (United States) Nicole Gibbs, 6–3, 7–6^{(7–4)}

=== Doubles ===
- (Brazil) Gabriela Cé / (Paraguay) Verónica Cepede Royg defeated (Georgia (country)) Oksana Kalashnikova / (Germany) Tatjana Maria, 1–6, 6–4, [10–8]

== Singles entrants ==
=== Seeds ===
Country	Player	Rank^{1}	Seed
BEL	Yanina Wickmayer	49	1
GER	Tatjana Maria	69	2
SRB	Bojana Jovanovski	78	3
GBR	Naomi Broady	120	4
USA	Nicole Gibbs	121	5
ISR	Julia Glushko	127	6
USA	Sachia Vickery	130	7
SWE	Rebecca Peterson	133	8

- ^{1} Rankings as of 16 November 2015.

=== Other entrants ===
The following players received wildcards into the singles main draw:

- (United States) Brett Berger
- (United States) Nicole Mossmer
- (United States) Zoë Gwen Scandalis
- (United States) Alexandra Stevenson
- (Belgium) Yanina Wickmayer

The following players received entry from the qualifying draw:

- (Canada) Françoise Abanda
- (Canada) Sharon Fichman

== Doubles entrants ==
=== Seeds ===
Country	Player	Country	Player	Rank	Seed
GEO	Oksana Kalashnikova	GER	Tatjana Maria	157	1
CAN	Gabriela Dabrowski	CAN	Sharon Fichman	180	2
BRA	Paula Cristina Gonçalves	USA	Sanaz Marand	217	3
ISR	Julia Glushko	SWE	Rebecca Peterson	260	4

- ^{1} Rankings as of 16 November 2015.

=== Other entrants ===
The following pair received a wildcard into the doubles main draw:

- (United States) Kaitlyn Christian / (United States) Sabrina Santamaria
