= 2015 Open de Limoges – Doubles =

Doubles
- 2015 Open de Limoges

Final
- Champions: (Czech Republic) Barbora Krejčíková (Luxembourg) Mandy Minella
- Runners-up: (Russia) Margarita Gasparyan (Georgia (country)) Oksana Kalashnikova
- Score: 1–6, 7–5, [10–6]

Events
| Singles | Doubles |
- Open de Limoges

Kateřina Siniaková and Renata Voráčová were the defending champions, but they chose not to participate this year.

Barbora Krejčíková and Mandy Minella won the title, defeating Margarita Gasparyan and Oksana Kalashnikova in the final 1–6, 7–5, [10–6].

== Seeds ==
1. (Russia) Margarita Gasparyan / (Georgia (country)) Oksana Kalashnikova (final)
2. (Czech Republic) Barbora Krejčíková / (Luxembourg) Mandy Minella (champions)
3. (Venezuela) Andrea Gámiz / (Spain) Sílvia Soler Espinosa (quarterfinals)
4. (Germany) Anna-Lena Friedsam / (Poland) Katarzyna Piter (quarterfinals)

== Draw ==
Key

- Q = Qualifier
- WC = Wild card
- LL = Lucky loser
- Alt = Alternate
- ITF = ITF entry
- PR = Protected ranking
- SR = Special ranking
- SE = Special exempt
- JE = Junior exempt
- JR = Junior Accelerator Programme entrant
- CO = College Accelerator Programme entrant
- NG = Next Gen Accelerator Program entrant
- w/o = Walkover
- r = Retired
- d = Defaulted

=== Draw ===
Quarterfinals
1 | (Russia) M Gasparyan (Georgia (country)) O Kalashnikova | 6 | 7
WC | (France) M Johansson (France) A Lim | 4 | 5
4 | (Germany) A-L Friedsam (Poland) K Piter | 6^{0} | 2
(Czech Republic) L Kunčíková (Czech Republic) K Stuchlá | 7^{7} | 6
(Germany) A Beck (Germany) C Witthöft | 6 | 6
3 | (Venezuela) A Gámiz (Spain) S Soler Espinosa | 0 | 2
(France) J Coin (France) P Parmentier | 5 | 4
2 | (Czech Republic) B Krejčíková (Luxembourg) M Minella | 7 | 6

Semifinals
1 | (Russia) M Gasparyan (Georgia (country)) O Kalashnikova | 6 | 6
(Czech Republic) L Kunčíková (Czech Republic) K Stuchlá | 3 | 3
(Germany) A Beck (Germany) C Witthöft | 5 | 5
2 | (Czech Republic) B Krejčíková (Luxembourg) M Minella | 7 | 7

Final
1 | (Russia) M Gasparyan (Georgia (country)) O Kalashnikova | 6 | 5 | [6]
2 | (Czech Republic) B Krejčíková (Luxembourg) M Minella | 1 | 7 | [10]
