= 2016 OEC Taipei WTA Challenger – Singles =

Singles
- 2016 OEC Taipei WTA Challenger

Final
- Champion: (Russia) Evgeniya Rodina
- Runner-up: (Chinese Taipei) Chang Kai-chen
- Score: 6–4, 6–3

Events
Singles	Doubles
- OEC Taipei WTA Challenger

Tímea Babos was the defending champion, but chose not to participate.

Evgeniya Rodina won the title, defeating Chang Kai-chen in the final, 6–4, 6–3.

== Seeds ==
1. (France) Kristina Mladenovic (withdrew)
2. (United Kingdom) Naomi Broady (first round)
3. (Greece) Maria Sakkari (first round)
4. (Russia) Irina Khromacheva (first round)
5. (Japan) Risa Ozaki (first round)
6. (Russia) Evgeniya Rodina (champion)
7. (Spain) Sara Sorribes Tormo (first round)
8. (New Zealand) Marina Erakovic (semifinals)
9. (China) Wang Yafan (first round; retired)

== Main draw ==
Key

- Q = Qualifier
- WC = Wild card
- LL = Lucky loser
- Alt = Alternate
- ITF = ITF entry
- PR = Protected ranking
- SR = Special ranking
- SE = Special exempt
- JE = Junior exempt
- JR = Junior Accelerator Programme entrant
- CO = College Accelerator Programme entrant
- NG = Next Gen Accelerator Program entrant
- w/o = Walkover
- r = Retired
- d = Defaulted

=== Finals ===
Semifinals
(Chinese Taipei) Chang Kai-chen	6	6
8	(New Zealand) Marina Erakovic	3	2
6	(Russia) Evgeniya Rodina	6	0
(Belarus) Olga Govortsova	2	0^{r}

Final
(Chinese Taipei) Chang Kai-chen	4	3
6	(Russia) Evgeniya Rodina	6	6

=== Top half ===
First round
9	(China) Y Wang	1	2^{r}
(Thailand) L Kumkhum	6	3
(Turkey) İ Soylu	5	6	4
(Slovakia) D Hantuchová	7	2	2^{r}
WC	(Chinese Taipei) C-w Hsu	3	3
(Chinese Taipei) K-c Chang	6	6
(China) K Zhang	7	3	6
7	(Spain) S Sorribes Tormo	5	6	2
4	(Russia) I Khromacheva	5	1
(Germany) T Maria	7	6
(Belgium) A Van Uytvanck	6	6
(Japan) H Kuwata	0	1
Q	(Thailand) Vara Wongteanchai	3	4
(Russia) V Kudermetova	6	6
LL	(Japan) K Okamura	4	2
8	(New Zealand) M Erakovic	6	6

Second round
(Thailand) L Kumkhum	6	6
(Turkey) İ Soylu	2	4
(Chinese Taipei) K-c Chang	6	6
(China) K Zhang	2	1
(Germany) T Maria	2	7	7^{7}
(Belgium) A Van Uytvanck	6	5	6^{3}
(Russia) V Kudermetova	5	3
8	(New Zealand) M Erakovic	7	6

Quarterfinals
(Thailand) L Kumkhum	1	5
(Chinese Taipei) K-c Chang	6	7
(Germany) T Maria	4	6^{4}
8	(New Zealand) M Erakovic	6	7^{7}

Semifinals
(Chinese Taipei) K-c Chang	6	6
8	(New Zealand) M Erakovic	3	2

=== Bottom half ===
First round
6	(Russia) E Rodina	6	6
Q	(Chinese Taipei) P-c Lee	2	1
(Slovenia) D Jakupović	7^{7}	6
WC	(Chinese Taipei) Y-h Lee	6^{4}	1
Q	(Japan) J Namigata	6	7
WC	(Chinese Taipei) C-y Hsu	2	5
Q	(Australia) A Barty	6	0	6
3	(Greece) M Sakkari	4	6	3
5	(Japan) R Ozaki	1	3
(Belarus) O Govortsova	6	6
(United States) J Boserup	6	7
(Japan) R Sawayanagi	2	5
(Japan) E Hozumi	4	6^{7}
(Japan) M Kato	6	7^{9}
WC	(Russia) V Diatchenko	6	2	7^{7}
2	(United Kingdom) N Broady	3	6	6^{4}

Second round
6	(Russia) E Rodina	2	6	6
(Slovenia) D Jakupović	6	4	1
Q	(Japan) J Namigata	2	3
Q	(Australia) A Barty	6	6
(Belarus) O Govortsova	5	7^{7}	7
(United States) J Boserup	7	6^{5}	5
(Japan) M Kato	5	4
WC	(Russia) V Diatchenko	7	6

Quarterfinals
6	(Russia) E Rodina	1	3
Q	(Australia) A Barty	6	0^{r}
(Belarus) O Govortsova	6	6
WC	(Russia) V Diatchenko	1	3

Semifinals
6	(Russia) E Rodina	6	0
(Belarus) O Govortsova	2	0^{r}
