= 2015 Open de Limoges =

- Date: 9–15 November
- Edition: 9th
- Category: WTA 125K series
- Prize money: $115,000
- Surface: Hard (indoor)
- Location: Limoges, France

Champions

Singles
- (France) Caroline Garcia

Doubles
- (Czech Republic) Barbora Krejčíková / (Luxembourg) Mandy Minella
← 2014 ·	Open de Limoges	· 2016 →

The 2015 Open de Limoges (also known as the Engie Open de Limoges for sponsorship reasons) was a professional tennis tournament played on indoor hard courts. It was the ninth edition of the tournament, and part of the 2015 WTA 125K series. It took place in Limoges, France, on 9–15 November 2015.

== Singles entrants ==
=== Seeds ===
Country	Player	Rank^{1}	Seed
UKR	Elina Svitolina	20	1
~~UKR~~	~~Lesia Tsurenko~~	~~33~~	~~2~~
FRA	Caroline Garcia	35	3
GER	Annika Beck	56	4
MNE	Danka Kovinić	58	5
RUS	Margarita Gasparyan	59	6
GER	Carina Witthöft	65	7
GER	Anna-Lena Friedsam	93	8

- ^{1} Rankings as of 2 November 2015

=== Other entrants ===
The following players received wildcards into the singles main draw:

- (France) Tessah Andrianjafitrimo
- (France) Julie Coin
- (France) Caroline Garcia
- (France) Mathilde Johansson
- (Ukraine) Elina Svitolina
- (Ukraine) Lesia Tsurenko

The following players received entry from the qualifying draw:

- (Russia) Ekaterina Alexandrova
- (Russia) Anna Blinkova
- (Venezuela) Andrea Gámiz
- (Ukraine) Kateryna Kozlova

The following players received entry as lucky losers:

- (Czech Republic) Barbora Krejčíková
- (Luxembourg) Mandy Minella

=== Withdrawals ===
Before the tournament

- (Japan) Kimiko Date-Krumm (left knee injury) → replaced by Barbora Krejčíková
- (Ukraine) Lesia Tsurenko (viral illness) → replaced by Mandy Minella

== Doubles entrants ==
=== Seeds ===
Country	Player	Country	Player	Rank	Seed
RUS	Margarita Gasparyan	GEO	Oksana Kalashnikova	154	1
CZE	Barbora Krejčíková	LUX	Mandy Minella	185	2
VEN	Andrea Gámiz	ESP	Sílvia Soler Espinosa	282	3
GER	Anna-Lena Friedsam	POL	Katarzyna Piter	414	4

=== Other entrants ===
The following pair received a wildcard into the doubles main draw:

- (France) Mathilde Johansson / (France) Alizé Lim

== Champions ==
=== Singles ===
- (France) Caroline Garcia def. (United States) Louisa Chirico 6–1, 6–3

=== Doubles ===
- (Czech Republic) Barbora Krejčíková / (Luxembourg) Mandy Minella def. (Russia) Margarita Gasparyan / (Georgia (country)) Oksana Kalashnikova 1–6, 7–5, [10–6]
