= 2015 OEC Taipei WTA Challenger – Singles =

Singles
- 2015 OEC Taipei WTA Challenger

Final
- Champion: (Hungary) Tímea Babos
- Runner-up: (Japan) Misaki Doi
- Score: 7–5, 6–3

Events
Singles	Doubles
- OEC Taipei WTA Challenger

Vitalia Diatchenko was the defending champion, but she chose not to participate.

Tímea Babos won the title, defeating Misaki Doi in the final 7–5, 6–3.

== Seeds ==
1. (Japan) Misaki Doi (final)
2. (Kazakhstan) Yaroslava Shvedova (quarterfinals, retired)
3. (Russia) Evgeniya Rodina (semifinals)
4. (Hungary) Tímea Babos (champion)
5. (Belgium) Kirsten Flipkens (semifinals)
6. (Romania) Patricia Maria Țig (first round)
7. (Switzerland) Stefanie Vögele (quarterfinals)
8. (China) Wang Yafan (second round)

== Main draw ==
Key

- Q = Qualifier
- WC = Wild card
- LL = Lucky loser
- Alt = Alternate
- ITF = ITF entry
- PR = Protected ranking
- SR = Special ranking
- SE = Special exempt
- JE = Junior exempt
- JR = Junior Accelerator Programme entrant
- CO = College Accelerator Programme entrant
- NG = Next Gen Accelerator Program entrant
- w/o = Walkover
- r = Retired
- d = Defaulted

=== Finals ===
Semifinals
1	(Japan) Misaki Doi	7^{7}	6
3	(Russia) Evgeniya Rodina	6^{3}	2
4	(Hungary) Tímea Babos	6	7^{7}
5	(Belgium) Kirsten Flipkens	3	6^{1}

Final
1	(Japan) Misaki Doi	5	3
4	(Hungary) Tímea Babos	7	6

=== Top half ===
First round
1	(Japan) M Doi	6	7
(Japan) R Ozaki	3	5
(Hong Kong) L Zhang	6	6^{6}	6
WC	(Chinese Taipei) C-y Hsu	1	7^{8}	2
(Thailand) L Kumkhum	5	6	6
WC	(Chinese Taipei) C-w Hsu	7	2	2
Q	(Japan) K Takahata	2	6	2
8	(China) Y Wang	6	3	6
3	(Russia) E Rodina	7^{7}	6
(China) J Lu	6^{5}	3
(China) Y Zhang	6	6
(Japan) J Namigata	0	3
(India) A Raina	6^{2}	1
(China) C Liu	7^{7}	6
(Japan) K Date-Krumm	7	1	6
6	(Romania) PM Țig	5	6	3

Second round
1	(Japan) M Doi	6	6
(Hong Kong) L Zhang	4	4
(Thailand) L Kumkhum	3	6	6
8	(China) Y Wang	6	3	1
3	(Russia) E Rodina	6	6
(China) Y Zhang	4	3
(China) C Liu	6	6
(Japan) K Date-Krumm	3	3

Quarterfinals
1	(Japan) M Doi	6	6
(Thailand) L Kumkhum	3	4
3	(Russia) E Rodina	4	6	6
(China) C Liu	6	2	4

Semifinals
1	(Japan) M Doi	7^{7}	6
3	(Russia) E Rodina	6^{3}	2

=== Bottom half ===
First round
7	(Switzerland) S Vögele	7^{7}	6
(Chinese Taipei) Y-h Lee	6^{4}	4
Q	(Thailand) N Lertpitaksinchai	4	3
(Greece) M Sakkari	6	6
(Belgium) E Mertens	6	6
(China) X Han	2	4
Q	(Croatia) T Lukas	5	3
4	(Hungary) T Babos	7	6
5	(Belgium) K Flipkens	6	6
WC	(Chinese Taipei) I-h Cho	3	3
WC	(Chinese Taipei) C-w Chan	2	0
(China) K Zhang	6	6
Q	(Japan) H Kuwata	5	6	0
(France) A Hesse	7	4	6
(Russia) M Melnikova	0	4
2	(Kazakhstan) Y Shvedova	6	6

Second round
7	(Switzerland) S Vögele	6	6
(Greece) M Sakkari	1	1
(Belgium) E Mertens	2	2
4	(Hungary) T Babos	6	6
5	(Belgium) K Flipkens	6	6
(China) K Zhang	3	1
(France) A Hesse	6	6^{2}	2
2	(Kazakhstan) Y Shvedova	3	7^{7}	6

Quarterfinals
7	(Switzerland) S Vögele	4	5
4	(Hungary) T Babos	6	7
5	(Belgium) K Flipkens	4	2
2	(Kazakhstan) Y Shvedova	6	1^{r}

Semifinals
4	(Hungary) T Babos	6	7^{7}
5	(Belgium) K Flipkens	3	6^{1}

== Qualifying ==
=== Seeds ===
1. (Japan) Hiroko Kuwata (qualified)
2. (Croatia) Tena Lukas (qualified)
3. (Thailand) Peangtarn Plipuech (qualifying competition)
4. (Thailand) Nicha Lertpitaksinchai (qualified)

=== Qualifiers ===
1. (Japan) Hiroko Kuwata
2. (Croatia) Tena Lukas
3. (Japan) Kotomi Takahata
4. (Thailand) Nicha Lertpitaksinchai

=== Draw ===
==== First qualifier ====
Qualifying competition
1	(Japan) Hiroko Kuwata	6	6
	(Chinese Taipei) Lee Pei-chi	2	4

==== Second qualifier ====
Qualifying competition
2	(Croatia) Tena Lukas	6	6
WC	(Chinese Taipei) Cho Yi-tsen	3	2

==== Third qualifier ====
Qualifying competition
3	(Thailand) Peangtarn Plipuech	6^{1}	6^{4}
	(Japan) Kotomi Takahata	7^{7}	7^{7}

==== Fourth qualifier ====
Qualifying competition
4	(Thailand) Nicha Lertpitaksinchai	6	6
WC	(Chinese Taipei) Lee Yang	2	2
