= 2015 Open de Limoges – Singles =

Singles
- 2015 Open de Limoges

Final
- Champion: (France) Caroline Garcia
- Runner-up: (United States) Louisa Chirico
- Score: 6–1, 6–3

Events
Singles	Doubles
← 2014 ·	Open de Limoges	· 2016 →

Tereza Smitková was the defending champion, but chose not to participate this year.
Caroline Garcia won the title, defeating Louisa Chirico in the final 6–1, 6–3.

== Seeds ==
1. (Ukraine) Elina Svitolina (first round)
2. (Ukraine) Lesia Tsurenko (withdrew due to viral illness)
3. (France) Caroline Garcia (champion)
4. (Germany) Annika Beck (first round)
5. (Montenegro) Danka Kovinić (second round)
6. (Russia) Margarita Gasparyan (quarterfinals)
7. (Germany) Carina Witthöft (second round)
8. (Germany) Anna-Lena Friedsam (quarterfinals)

== Draw ==
=== Key ===
- Q = Qualifier
- WC = Wild card
- LL = Lucky loser
- Alt = Alternate
- SE = Special exempt
- PR = Protected ranking
- ITF = ITF entry
- JE = Junior exempt
- w/o = Walkover
- r = Retired
- d = Defaulted
- SR = Special ranking

=== Finals ===
Semifinals
(Czech Republic) Kateřina Siniaková	3	7	3
3/WC	(France) Caroline Garcia	6	5	6
(United States) Louisa Chirico	6	7^{7}
(Italy) Francesca Schiavone	3	6^{5}

Final
3/WC	(France) Caroline Garcia	6	6
(United States) Louisa Chirico	1	3

=== Top half ===
First round
1/WC	(Ukraine) E Svitolina	4	6	6^{6}
(France) P Parmentier	6	4	7^{8}
(France) A Lim	4	6^{1}
(Czech Republic) K Siniaková	6	7^{7}
(Romania) A Mitu	4	3
(Austria) T Paszek	6	6
Q	(Russia) A Blinkova	3	6	3
8	(Germany) A-L Friedsam	6	2	6
3/WC	(France) C Garcia	1	6	7
Q	(Russia) E Alexandrova	6	2	5
(France) O Dodin	6^{5}	5
(Netherlands) R Hogenkamp	7^{7}	7
(France) A Hesse	2	7^{7}	0
(Croatia) D Vekić	6	6^{2}	6
WC	(France) T Andrianjafitrimo	6^{6}	2
7	(Germany) C Witthöft	7^{8}	6

Second round
(France) P Parmentier	6^{8}	5
(Czech Republic) K Siniaková	7^{10}	7
(Austria) T Paszek	6^{1}	4
8	(Germany) A-L Friedsam	7^{7}	6
3/WC	(France) C Garcia	6	6
(Netherlands) R Hogenkamp	2	2
(Croatia) D Vekić	3	6	6
7	(Germany) C Witthöft	6	2	1

Quarterfinals
(Czech Republic) K Siniaková	7	2	6
8	(Germany) A-L Friedsam	5	6	3
3/WC	(France) C Garcia	3	6	6
(Croatia) D Vekić	6	1	1

Semifinals
(Czech Republic) K Siniaková	3	7	3
3/WC	(France) C Garcia	6	5	6

=== Bottom half ===
First round
5	(Montenegro) D Kovinić	6	6
(Latvia) A Sevastova	4	3
LL	(Czech Republic) B Krejčíková	6^{5}	4
Q	(Ukraine) K Kozlova	7^{7}	6
WC	(France) J Coin	6	3	4
WC	(France) M Johansson	4	6	6
(United States) L Chirico	5	6	6
4	(Germany) A Beck	7	2	2
6	(Russia) M Gasparyan	6	7
Q	(Venezuela) A Gámiz	2	5
(Ukraine) M Zanevska	4	6	7^{8}
(Spain) S Soler Espinosa	6	3	6^{6}
(Czech Republic) Kr Plíšková	4	3
(Italy) F Schiavone	6	6
(Switzerland) S Vögele	4	2
LL	(Luxembourg) M Minella	6	6

Second round
5	(Montenegro) D Kovinić	3	0
Q	(Ukraine) K Kozlova	6	6
WC	(France) M Johansson	6	2	1
(United States) L Chirico	3	6	6
6	(Russia) M Gasparyan	6	6
(Ukraine) M Zanevska	2	4
(Italy) F Schiavone	6	6
LL	(Luxembourg) M Minella	2	3

Quarterfinals
Q	(Ukraine) K Kozlova	5	2
(United States) L Chirico	7	6
6	(Russia) M Gasparyan	6^{5}	0^{r}
(Italy) F Schiavone	7^{7}	0

Semifinals
(United States) L Chirico	6	7^{7}
(Italy) F Schiavone	3	6^{5}

== Qualifying ==
=== Seeds ===
1. (Czech Republic) Barbora Krejčíková (qualifying competition, lucky loser)
2. (Luxembourg) Mandy Minella (qualifying competition, lucky loser)
3. (Ukraine) Kateryna Kozlova (qualified)
4. (Poland) Katarzyna Piter (qualifying competition)
5. (Uzbekistan) Nigina Abduraimova (first round)
6. (France) Myrtille Georges (qualifying competition)
7. (Venezuela) Andrea Gámiz (qualified)
8. (France) Chloé Paquet (first round)

=== Qualifiers ===
1. (Venezuela) Andrea Gámiz
2. (Russia) Anna Blinkova
3. (Ukraine) Kateryna Kozlova
4. (Russia) Ekaterina Alexandrova

=== Lucky losers ===
1. (Czech Republic) Barbora Krejčíková
2. (Luxembourg) Mandy Minella

=== Draw ===
==== First qualifier ====
First round				Qualifying competition
				1	(Czech Republic) Barbora Krejčíková	2	4
	(France) Fiona Codino	1	2	7	(Venezuela) Andrea Gámiz	6	6
7	(Venezuela) Andrea Gámiz	6	6

==== Second qualifier ====
First round					Qualifying competition
					2	(Luxembourg) Mandy Minella	3	6	4
	(Russia) Anna Blinkova	6	6^{4}	6		(Russia) Anna Blinkova	6	4	6
5	(Uzbekistan) Nigina Abduraimova	3	7^{7}	4

==== Third qualifier ====
First round
3	(Ukraine) Kateryna Kozlova	4	6	7
(Georgia (country)) Oksana Kalashnikova	6	0	5
(Spain) Georgina García Pérez	1	3
6	(France) Myrtille Georges	6	6

Qualifying competition
3	(Ukraine) Kateryna Kozlova	1	6	6
6	(France) Myrtille Georges	6	4	3

==== Fourth qualifier ====
First round
4	(Poland) Katarzyna Piter	7	6
(Slovakia) Rebecca Šramková	5	3
(Russia) Ekaterina Alexandrova	7	3	7^{7}
8	(France) Chloé Paquet	5	6	6^{5}

Qualifying competition
4	(Poland) Katarzyna Piter	4	6^{3}
(Russia) Ekaterina Alexandrova	6	7^{7}
