= 2015 Carlsbad Classic – Doubles =

Doubles
- 2015 Carlsbad Classic

Final
- Champions: (Brazil) Gabriela Cé (Paraguay) Verónica Cepede Royg
- Runners-up: (Georgia (country)) Oksana Kalashnikova (Germany) Tatjana Maria
- Score: 1–6, 6–4, [10–8]

Details
- Draw: 8
- Seeds: 4

Events
| Singles | Doubles |
- Carlsbad Classic

This is the first edition of the tournament as part of the WTA 125K Series.
Gabriela Cé and Verónica Cepede Royg won the title, defeating Oksana Kalashnikova and Tatjana Maria in the final 1–6, 6–4, [10–8].

== Seeds ==
1. (Georgia (country)) Oksana Kalashnikova / (Germany) Tatjana Maria (final)
2. (Canada) Gabriela Dabrowski / (Canada) Sharon Fichman (quarterfinals)
3. (Brazil) Paula Cristina Gonçalves / (United States) Sanaz Marand (quarterfinals)
4. (Israel) Julia Glushko / (Sweden) Rebecca Peterson (semifinals)

== Draw ==
Key

- Q = Qualifier
- WC = Wild card
- LL = Lucky loser
- Alt = Alternate
- ITF = ITF entry
- PR = Protected ranking
- SR = Special ranking
- SE = Special exempt
- JE = Junior exempt
- JR = Junior Accelerator Programme entrant
- CO = College Accelerator Programme entrant
- NG = Next Gen Accelerator Program entrant
- w/o = Walkover
- r = Retired
- d = Defaulted

Quarterfinals
1 | (Georgia (country)) O Kalashnikova (Germany) T Maria | 6 | 6
(Bulgaria) E Kostova (Russia) M Melnikova | 2 | 3
4 | (Israel) J Glushko (Sweden) R Peterson | 6 | 6
WC | (United States) K Christian (United States) S Santamaria | 4 | 3
(United Kingdom) N Broady (United States) N Gibbs | 1 | 6 | [10]
3 | (Brazil) PC Gonçalves (United States) S Marand | 6 | 4 | [3]
Alt | (Brazil) G Cé (Paraguay) V Cepede Royg | 1 | 6 | [10]
2 | (Canada) G Dabrowski (Canada) S Fichman | 6 | 0 | [8]

Semifinals
1 | (Georgia (country)) O Kalashnikova (Germany) T Maria | 7^{7} | 6
4 | (Israel) J Glushko (Sweden) R Peterson | 6^{3} | 3
(United Kingdom) N Broady (United States) N Gibbs | 2 | 0
Alt | (Brazil) G Cé (Paraguay) V Cepede Royg | 6 | 6

Final
1 | (Georgia (country)) O Kalashnikova (Germany) T Maria | 6 | 4 | [8]
Alt | (Brazil) G Cé (Paraguay) V Cepede Royg | 1 | 6 | [10]
