= Alice Hall =

American jazz musician

Alice Hall (June 1917 – 2000, born Alice Marie Laquiere in Brussels, Belgium) was a jazz accordionist. She released a single recording in 1949.

== Early life ==
Hall was raised in Detroit, Michigan, after her family emigrated. Her father was a musician who taught her drums and accordion so she could accompany him on stage. She played European-style chromatic button accordion with a "finto-piano" (false piano) keyboard similar to that used by vaudeville accordionist Pietro Frosini and jazz accordionist Leon Sash.

She began working professionally at age 13 on the radio in Detroit. To ensure she had places to perform, her father opened a bar, the Blue Star, where he could watch over her. She started a band with her sister Rachel playing drums and accordion. During World War II they were advertised in Billboard as "2 Boys, 2 Girls, Sax, Piano, Accordion, drums."

== Career ==
Benny Goodman invited her to on tour, but the club owner where she was playing refused to release her contract. She declined when Jack Teagarden asked her to join his orchestra, explaining later, "Playing with a big band, you know how many chances you get to play sixteen bars of something or eight bars of something and that's it? You know, there's nothing there.... I wanted to prove that something can be done on this instrument, other than playing just the ordinary, 'Jolly Caballero' stuff, you know?"

Hall left minimal recordings, saying in a 1997 NPR interview that she had been "too busy gigging to record much."

She signed with Capitol Records in 1948 but her recording was delayed by the 1948 Musicians Union recording ban, which followed the larger 1942–44 musicians' strike. She released one known commercial 78 rpm disc, "Pennies from Heaven"/"Caravan" on Capitol in 1949. A copy of her 78 is in the holdings of a Swedish accordion museum ("dragspel"). Hall later taped several demos and these and some rough live recordings were self-released in the 1990s.

== Later life ==
In the 1970s Hall dropped out of music and checked herself into a hospital for depression. She spent the rest of her life dedicated to the instrument and supporting other accordion players. She published the Friends of the Accordion newsletter in Los Angeles. Her version of "What Is This Thing Called Love?" was included in the 1995 Planet Squeezebox compilation.
