= 2015 Hua Hin Championships – Men's singles =

Men's singles
- 2015 Hua Hin Championships

Final
- Champion: (Japan) Yūichi Sugita
- Runner-up: (France) Stéphane Robert
- Score: 6–2, 1–6, 6–3

Events
Singles	men	women
Doubles	men	women
- Hua Hin Championships

Yūichi Sugita won the title, defeating Stéphane Robert in the final 6–2, 1–6, 6–3.

== Seeds ==
1. (Chinese Taipei) Lu Yen-hsun (quarterfinals)
2. (Russia) Evgeny Donskoy (second round)
3. (India) Yuki Bhambri (first round, retired)
4. (Israel) Dudi Sela (first round)
5. (Japan) Tatsuma Ito (semifinals)
6. (Spain) Adrián Menéndez-Maceiras (first round)
7. (Estonia) Jürgen Zopp (semifinals)
8. (Japan) Yoshihito Nishioka (quarterfinals)

== Draw ==
Key

- Q = Qualifier
- WC = Wild card
- LL = Lucky loser
- Alt = Alternate
- ITF = ITF entry
- PR = Protected ranking
- SR = Special ranking
- SE = Special exempt
- JE = Junior exempt
- JR = Junior Accelerator Programme entrant
- CO = College Accelerator Programme entrant
- NG = Next Gen Accelerator Program entrant
- w/o = Walkover
- r = Retired
- d = Defaulted

=== Finals ===
Semifinals
7	(Estonia) Jürgen Zopp	5	6	3
(Japan) Yūichi Sugita	7	2	6
5	(Japan) Tatsuma Ito	4	2
Q	(France) Stéphane Robert	6	6

Final
(Japan) Yūichi Sugita	6	1	6
Q	(France) Stéphane Robert	2	6	3

=== Top half ===
First round
1	(Chinese Taipei) Y-h Lu	6	6
(Chinese Taipei) T-h Yang	2	1
(China) D Wu	6	7^{7}
Q	(France) Laurent Rochette	1	6^{1}
(Belgium) Y Mertens	6	6
(France) T Lamasine	4	1
(Italy) T Fabbiano	1	0
7	(Estonia) J Zopp	6	6
3	(India) Y Bhambri	0	0^{r}
(Japan) Y Sugita	6	0
WC	(Thailand) W Sornbutnark	6^{4}	3
WC	(Thailand) P Isaro	7^{7}	6
(Germany) P Gojowczyk	6	6
(China) Z Zhang	4	3
(Russia) A Kudryavtsev	2	6^{5}
8	(Japan) Y Nishioka	6	7^{7}

Second round
1	(Chinese Taipei) Y-h Lu	7^{7}	6
(China) D Wu	6^{3}	3
(Belgium) Y Mertens	7	5	6^{2}
7	(Estonia) J Zopp	5	7	7^{7}
(Japan) Y Sugita	6	6
WC	(Thailand) P Isaro	1	2
(Germany) P Gojowczyk	4	6^{4}
8	(Japan) Y Nishioka	6	7^{7}

Quarterfinals
1	(Chinese Taipei) Y-h Lu	6	6^{3}	6^{3}
7	(Estonia) J Zopp	0	7^{7}	7^{7}
(Japan) Y Sugita	7^{7}	7
8	(Japan) Y Nishioka	6^{4}	5

Semifinals
7	(Estonia) J Zopp	5	6	3
(Japan) Y Sugita	7	2	6

=== Bottom half ===
First round
5	(Japan) T Ito	6	6
Q	(Thailand) J Navasirisomboon	2	3
(Belgium) G Gigounon	4	4
WC	(Thailand) Puriwat Chatpatcharoen	6	6
Q	(Italy) R Ghedin	6	6
WC	(Thailand) K Wachiramanowong	0	3
(Germany) N Langer	7^{7}	7^{7}
4	(Israel) D Sela	6^{4}	6^{2}
6	(Spain) A Menéndez-Maceiras	5	6	3
PR	(Israel) A Weintraub	7	3	6
(Japan) H Moriya	7	3
(China) Y Bai	5	0^{r}
Q	(France) S Robert	6	6
LL	(Japan) T Matsui	1	1
(Chinese Taipei) T Chen	1	1^{r}
2	(Russia) E Donskoy	6	2

Second round
5	(Japan) T Ito	6	6
WC	(Thailand) P Chatpatcharoen	3	1
Q	(Italy) R Ghedin	0	3
(Germany) N Langer	6	6
PR	(Israel) A Weintraub	6^{3}	6^{10}
(Japan) H Moriya	7^{7}	7^{12}
Q	(France) S Robert	4	6	6
2	(Russia) E Donskoy	6	1	4

Quarterfinals
5	(Japan) T Ito	7^{8}	6
(Germany) N Langer	6^{6}	1
(Japan) H Moriya	1	6	1
Q	(France) S Robert	6	4	6

Semifinals
5	(Japan) T Ito	4	2
Q	(France) S Robert	6	6
