= 2015 Carlsbad Classic – Singles =

Singles
- 2015 Carlsbad Classic

Final
- Champion: (Belgium) Yanina Wickmayer
- Runner-up: (United States) Nicole Gibbs
- Score: 6–3, 7–6^{(7–4)}

Details
- Draw: 32
- Seeds: 8

Events
Singles	Doubles
- Carlsbad Classic

This is the first edition of the tournament as part of the WTA 125K Series.

Yanina Wickmayer won the title, defeating Nicole Gibbs in the final 6–3, 7–6^{(7–4)}.

== Seeds ==
1. (Belgium) Yanina Wickmayer (champion)
2. (Germany) Tatjana Maria (quarterfinals)
3. (Serbia) Bojana Jovanovski (second round)
4. (United Kingdom) Naomi Broady (second round)
5. (United States) Nicole Gibbs (final)
6. (Israel) Julia Glushko (first round)
7. (United States) Sachia Vickery (first round)
8. (Sweden) Rebecca Peterson (first round)

== Draw ==
Key

- Q = Qualifier
- WC = Wild card
- LL = Lucky loser
- Alt = Alternate
- ITF = ITF entry
- PR = Protected ranking
- SR = Special ranking
- SE = Special exempt
- JE = Junior exempt
- JR = Junior Accelerator Programme entrant
- CO = College Accelerator Programme entrant
- NG = Next Gen Accelerator Program entrant
- w/o = Walkover
- r = Retired
- d = Defaulted

=== Finals ===
Semifinals
1/WC	(Belgium) Yanina Wickmayer	6	6
(Greece) Maria Sakkari	4	2
(United States) Jennifer Brady	0	4
5	(United States) Nicole Gibbs	6	6

Final
1/WC	(Belgium) Yanina Wickmayer	6	7^{7}
5	(United States) Nicole Gibbs	3	6^{4}

=== Top half ===
First round
1/WC	(Belgium) Y Wickmayer	7^{7}	6
(United States) J Boserup	6^{3}	3
(United States) K Ahn	6	4	6
(Slovenia) D Jakupović	4	6	4
(United States) K Stewart	7	6
(Brazil) PC Gonçalves	5	3
(United States) C Bellis	6	6
6	(Israel) J Glushko	3	4
4	(United Kingdom) N Broady	6	7
(Serbia) J Jakšić	3	5
(United States) S Crawford	6	6
(United States) G Min	2	3
(Greece) M Sakkari	6	6
WC	(United States) B Berger	0	0
(Switzerland) A Sadiković	6	7
8	(Sweden) R Peterson	4	5

Second round
1/WC	(Belgium) Y Wickmayer	7	6
(United States) K Ahn	5	3
(United States) K Stewart	2	7	4
(United States) C Bellis	6	5	6
4	(United Kingdom) N Broady	6	6^{4}	4
(United States) S Crawford	3	7^{7}	6
(Greece) M Sakkari	6	4	6
(Switzerland) A Sadiković	1	6	3

Quarterfinals
1/WC	(Belgium) Y Wickmayer	6	6
(United States) C Bellis	4	3
(United States) S Crawford	1	7^{7}	2
(Greece) M Sakkari	6	6^{3}	6

Semifinals
1/WC	(Belgium) Y Wickmayer	6	6
(Greece) M Sakkari	4	2

=== Bottom half ===
First round
7	(United States) S Vickery	4	2
(Bulgaria) E Kostova	6	6
(United States) D Lao	5	1
(United States) J Brady	7	6
(Russia) M Melnikova	6	6
Q	(Canada) S Fichman	4	3
WC	(United States) A Stevenson	6^{3}	6	1
3	(Serbia) B Jovanovski	7^{7}	3	6
5	(United States) N Gibbs	6	3
(Russia) A Kudryavtseva	3	2^{d}
(Paraguay) V Cepede Royg	6	6
(Brazil) G Cé	0	3
WC	(United States) ZG Scandalis	1	1
Q	(Canada) F Abanda	6	6
WC	(United States) N Mossmer	1	4
2	(Germany) T Maria	6	6

Second round
(Bulgaria) E Kostova	5	6	4
(United States) J Brady	7	3	6
(Russia) M Melnikova	7	4	6
3	(Serbia) B Jovanovski	5	6	4
5	(United States) N Gibbs	6	6
(Paraguay) V Cepede Royg	3	2
Q	(Canada) F Abanda	4	3
2	(Germany) T Maria	6	6

Quarterfinals
(United States) J Brady	6	7
(Russia) M Melnikova	2	5
5	(United States) N Gibbs	6	2	6
2	(Germany) T Maria	4	6	1

Semifinals
(United States) J Brady	0	4
5	(United States) N Gibbs	6	6

== Qualifying ==
=== Seeds ===
1. (Canada) Gabriela Dabrowski (first round)
2. (Canada) Carol Zhao (first round)
3. (Canada) Sharon Fichman (qualified)
4. (Canada) Françoise Abanda (qualified)

=== Qualifiers ===
1. (Canada) Françoise Abanda
2. (Canada) Sharon Fichman

=== Draw ===
==== First qualifier ====
First round
1	(Canada) Gabriela Dabrowski	6	2	5
WC	(United States) Vania King	3	6	7
WC	(Russia) Zlata Bobyr	2	1
4	(Canada) Françoise Abanda	6	6

Qualifying competition
WC	(United States) Vania King	4	4
4	(Canada) Françoise Abanda	6	6

==== Second qualifier ====
First round
2	(Canada) Carol Zhao	4	6	6^{4}
(United States) Tori Kinard	6	3	7^{7}
(United States) Jacqueline Cako	6^{5}	5
3	(Canada) Sharon Fichman	7^{7}	7

Qualifying competition
(United States) Tori Kinard	6	1	2
3	(Canada) Sharon Fichman	4	6	6
