= 2015 Hua Hin Championships – Men's doubles =

Men's doubles
- 2015 Hua Hin Championships

Final
- Champions: (Chinese Taipei) Lee Hsin-han (Chinese Taipei) Lu Yen-hsun
- Runners-up: (Germany) Andre Begemann (India) Purav Raja
- Score: Walkover

Events
Singles	men	women
Doubles	men	women
- Hua Hin Championships

Lee Hsin-han and Lu Yen-hsun won the title in men's tennis doubles, beating Andre Begemann and Purav Raja in the final by an walkover.

== Seeds ==
1. (Germany) Andre Begemann / (India) Purav Raja (final)
2. (Chinese Taipei) Lee Hsin-han / (Chinese Taipei) Lu Yen-hsun (champions)
3. (China) Gong Maoxin / (Chinese Taipei) Peng Hsien-yin (quarterfinals)
4. (United States) James Cerretani / (Chinese Taipei) Chen Ti (first round)

== Draw ==
Key

- Q = Qualifier
- WC = Wild card
- LL = Lucky loser
- Alt = Alternate
- ITF = ITF entry
- PR = Protected ranking
- SR = Special ranking
- SE = Special exempt
- JE = Junior exempt
- JR = Junior Accelerator Programme entrant
- CO = College Accelerator Programme entrant
- NG = Next Gen Accelerator Program entrant
- w/o = Walkover
- r = Retired
- d = Defaulted

=== Draw ===
First round
1	(Germany) A Begemann (India) P Raja	6	6
(Chinese Taipei) C-p Hsieh (Chinese Taipei) T-h Yang	2	4
PR	(Germany) P Gojowczyk (Israel) A Weintraub	6	6^{4}	[10]
(Russia) A Kudryavtsev (Belgium) Y Mertens	1	7^{7}	[4]
4	(United States) J Cerretani (Chinese Taipei) T Chen	6^{5}	6	[5]
(France) T Lamasine (Germany) N Langer	7^{7}	3	[10]
(Italy) T Fabbiano (Estonia) J Zopp	3	1
WC	(United States) JP Fruttero (Thailand) K Wachiramanowong	6	6
(Thailand) Sa Ratiwatana (Thailand) So Ratiwatana	7	3	[10]
(China) Y Bai (Italy) R Ghedin	5	6	[12]
WC	(Thailand) Puriwat Chatpatcharoen (Thailand) W Sornbutnark	1	2
3	(China) M Gong (Chinese Taipei) H-y Peng	6	6
(Japan) T Ito (Japan) T Matsui	6	6
(India) Y Bhambri (India) D Sharan	4	3
WC	(Thailand) P Isarow (Thailand) N Kadchapanan	4	4
2	(Chinese Taipei) H-h Lee (Chinese Taipei) Y-h Lu	6	6

Quarterfinals
1	(Germany) A Begemann (India) P Raja	6	6
(Germany) P Gojowczyk (Israel) A Weintraub	4	2
(France) T Lamasine (Germany) N Langer	6^{4}	6	[10]
WC	(United States) JP Fruttero (Thailand) K Wachiramanowong	7^{7}	3	[6]
(China) Y Bai (Italy) R Ghedin	5	4
3	(China) M Gong (Chinese Taipei) H-y Peng	7	5r
(Japan) T Ito (Japan) T Matsui	4	3
2	(Chinese Taipei) H-h Lee (Chinese Taipei) Y-h Lu	6	6

Semifinals
1	(Germany) A Begemann (India) P Raja	6	6
(France) T Lamasine (Germany) N Langer	2	0
(China) Y Bai (Italy) R Ghedin	7	2	[8]
2	(Chinese Taipei) H-h Lee (Chinese Taipei) Y-h Lu	5	6	[10]

Final
1	(Germany) A Begemann (India) P Raja
2	(Chinese Taipei) H-h Lee (Chinese Taipei) Y-h Lu	w/o
