= Julie Coin =

French tennis player

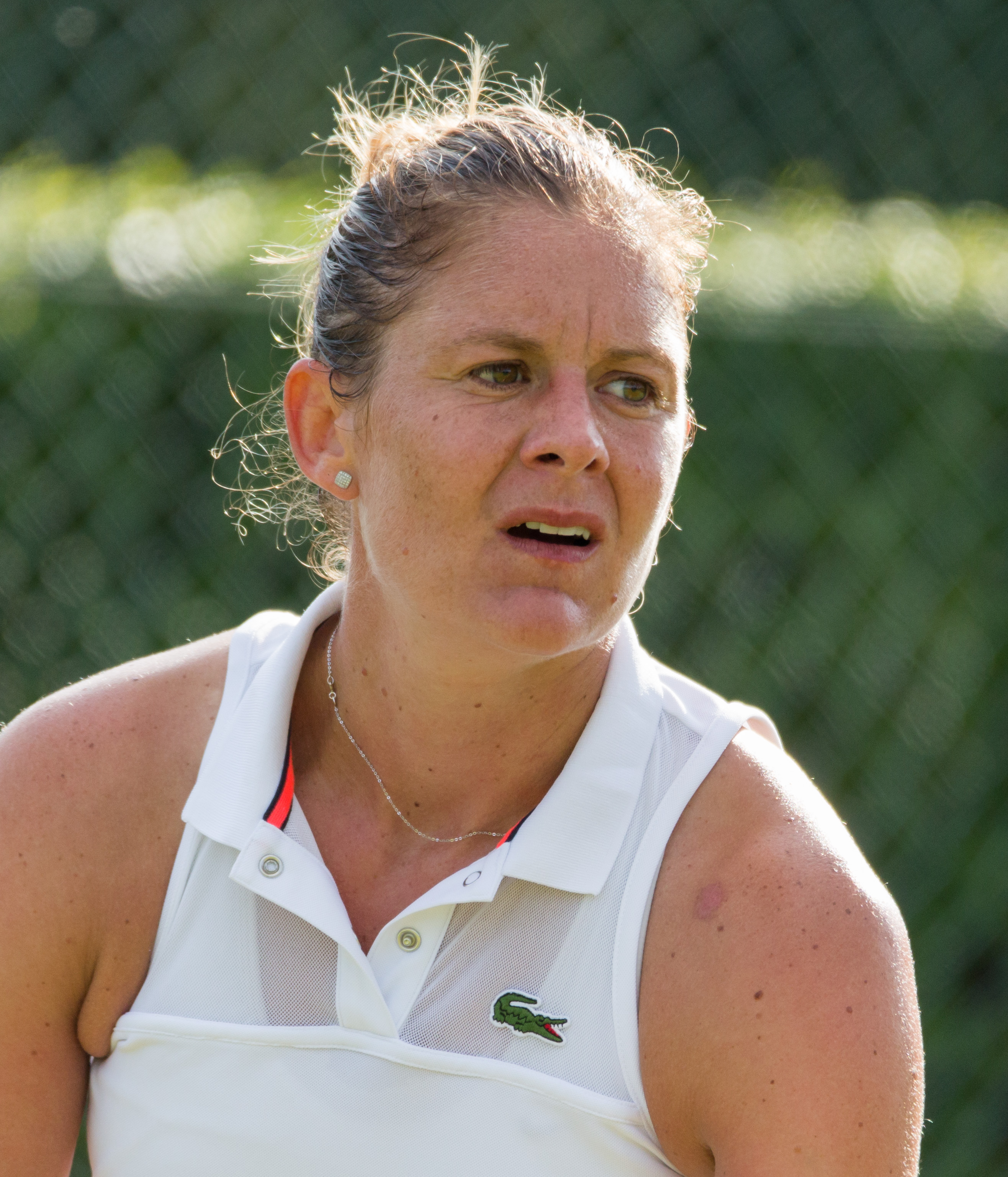
- Julie Coin at the 2015 Wimbledon qualifying tournament
- Country (sports): France
- Residence: Amiens, France
- Born: 2 December 1982 (age 43) Amiens
- Height: 1.72 m (5 ft 7 1/2 in)
- Turned pro: 1999
- Retired: November 2015
- Plays: Right-handed (two-handed backhand)
- Prize money: $814,412

Singles
- Career record: 362–268
- Career titles: 10 ITF
- Highest ranking: No. 60 (27 July 2009)

Grand Slam singles results
- Australian Open: 2R (2009, 2010)
- French Open: 2R (2009)
- Wimbledon: 1R (2009, 2010)
- US Open: 3R (2008)

Doubles
- Career record: 170–124
- Career titles: 16 ITF
- Highest ranking: No. 49 (19 April 2010)

Grand Slam doubles results
- Australian Open: 2R (2010)
- French Open: 3R (2014)
- Wimbledon: 1R (2009)
- US Open: 2R (2009)

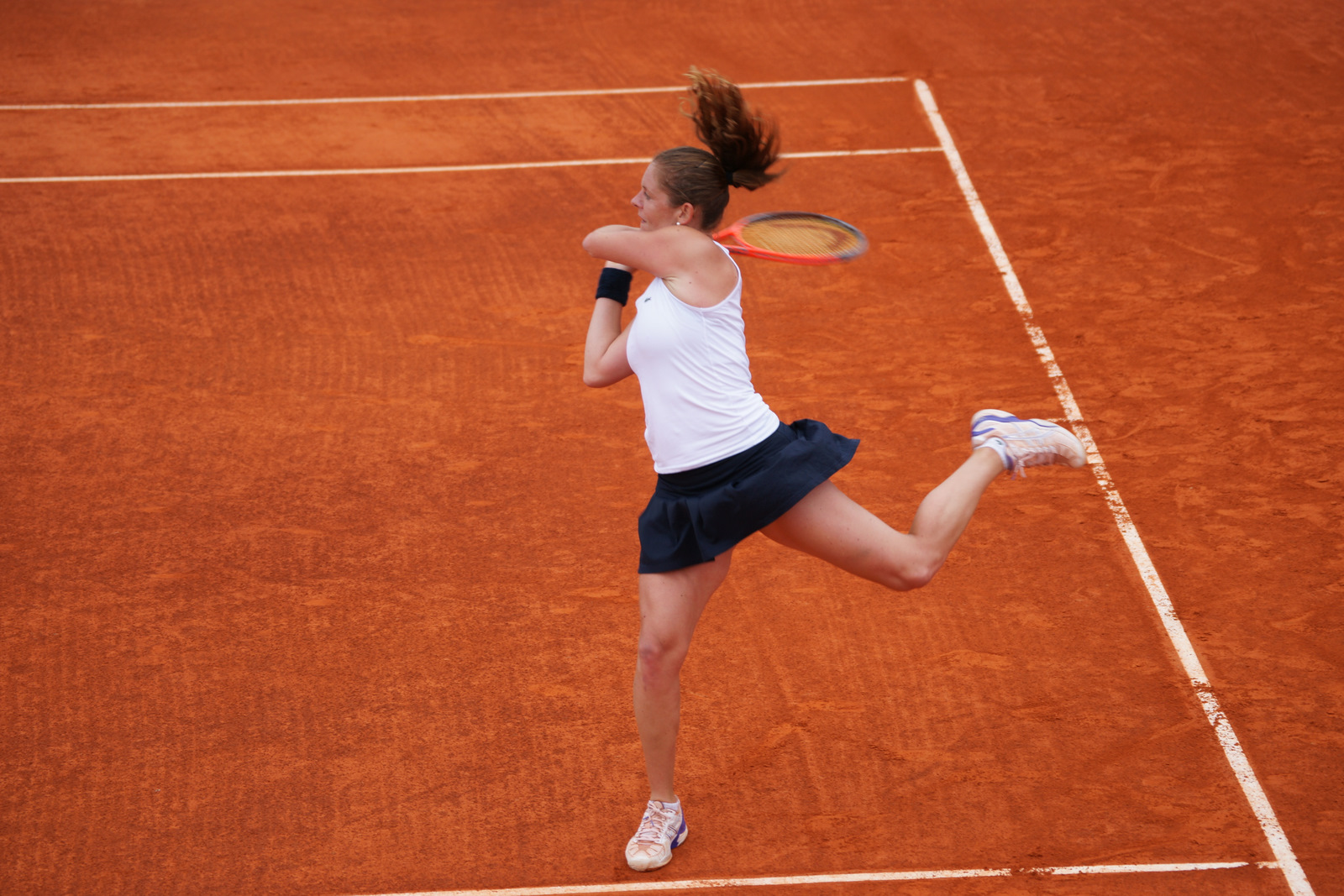
Julie Coin at the 2012 Open GDF Suez de Cagnes-sur-Mer Alpes-Maritimes

Julie Coin (French pronunciation: [ʒyli kwɛ̃]; born 2 December 1982) is a retired French tennis player.

Coin recorded the biggest win of her career by defeating the then-world No. 1 ranked Ana Ivanovic at the 2008 US Open. Her career-high singles ranking is world No. 60, achieved on 27 July 2009. She peaked at No. 49 in the doubles rankings on 19 April 2010.

== Personal life ==
Her parents, Philippe and Doriane Coin, were competitive team handball players.

== Career ==
=== Early career ===
Coin played at Clemson University, where she was an All-American, All-ACC, and ACC Player of the Year. She also holds numerous Clemson Women's Tennis records. Coin graduated from Clemson with a degree in mathematics.

=== 2008 ===
Coin and her doubles partner Violette Huck made it to the second round of the French Open women's doubles draw. Coin's breakthrough came at the US Open when she was ranked 188th in the world. She entered the main draw as a qualifier after defeating Amanda McDowell, Sesil Karatantcheva, and Elena Baltacha in the qualification rounds. This was the first time she had entered the main draw in singles at a WTA tournament. In the first round, she defeated Australian Casey Dellacqua 7–6, 7–6. Coin then rose to prominence and made worldwide headlines when she defeated world No. 1 and top-seeded Ana Ivanovic in the second round 6–3, 4–6, 6–3. ESPN and Sports Illustrated both called the win one of the greatest upsets in tennis history. Unfortunately, her parents only got to watch highlights of the match since Amélie Mauresmo, who was playing at the same time, was the one shown on French television.

Prior to Coin's upset victory, it had been 41 years since the top-seed had lost so early at the US Open, the previous time being when Maria Bueno lost in the second round of the 1967 U.S. National Championships. At the time of her victory against Ivanovic, Coin was ranked world No. 188.

She then lost 4–6, 4–6 to compatriot Amélie Mauresmo in the third round.

=== 2009 ===
Coin took on Mauresmo in the second round of woman's singles at Brisbane. The women played for approximately 3 hours, with Mauresmo eventually winning 5–7, 6–2, 7–6, after Coin held match points.

Coin beat Elena Vesnina 6–4, 4–6, 6–1 in the first round at the Australian Open. She fought hard, but ultimately fell to No. 14 Dominika Cibulková in three sets at Wimbledon.

=== 2010 ===
In the first round of the Australian Open, Coin recovered from a set down to defeat local favorite Alicia Molik 3–6, 7–6, 6–3 before losing in straight sets to Francesca Schiavone 3–6, 4–6.

=== 2015 ===
Partnering Emily Webley-Smith, Coin won the $100,000 tournament in February at Midland, defeating Jacqueline Cako and Sachia Vickery in the final. In November, she announced that the 2015 Open de Limoges will be her last professional tournament.

== ITF finals ==
=== Singles: 22 (10–12) ===
$100,000 tournaments
$75,000 tournaments
$50,000 tournaments
$25,000 tournaments
$10,000 tournaments

Outcome	No.	Date	Tournament	Surface	Opponent	Score
Winner	1.	24 July 2005	Les Contamines, France	Hard	(Slovakia) Dominika Nociarová	6–7^{(5–7)}, 6–2, 6–4
Winner	2.	14 August 2005	London, United Kingdom	Hard	(United Kingdom) Claire Peterzan	6–4, 1–6, 6–3
Runner-up	1.	22 January 2006	Oberhaching, Germany	Carpet (i)	(Germany) Sabine Klaschka	6–7^{(0–7)}, 6–4, 3–6
Runner-up	2.	26 March 2006	Amiens, France	Clay (i)	(Kazakhstan) Yaroslava Shvedova	6–2, 5–7, 4–6
Winner	3.	17 March 2007	Mérida, Mexico	Hard (i)	(Argentina) Vanina García Sokol	7–5, 6–4
Runner-up	3.	29 July 2007	Les Contamines, France	Hard	(Belgium) Yanina Wickmayer	2–6, 6–7^{(3–7)}
Winner	4.	3 February 2008	Belfort, France	Hard	(France) Virginie Pichet	6–0, 6–3
Runner-up	4.	28 July 2008	Vancouver, Canada	Hard	(Poland) Urszula Radwańska	6–2, 3–6, 5–7
Winner	5.	12 October 2008	Joué-lès-Tours, France	Hard	(France) Stéphanie Foretz	7–6^{(9–7)}, 7–6^{(7–3)}
Runner-up	5.	20 October 2008	Poitiers, France	Hard (i)	(Russia) Anastasia Pavlyuchenkova	4–6, 3–6
Winner	6.	1 March 2009	Clearwater, United States	Hard	(Belgium) Yanina Wickmayer	6–3, 1–1 ret.
Runner-up	6.	26 July 2009	Lexington, United States	Hard	(India) Sania Mirza	6–7^{(5–7)}, 4–6
Winner	7.	11 October 2009	Tokyo, Japan	Hard	(Ukraine) Olga Savchuk	7–6^{(8–6)}, 4–6, 7–6^{(8–6)}
Runner-up	7.	31 July 2011	Vigo, Spain	Hard	(France) Iryna Brémond	6–7^{(3–7)}, 6–1, 6–7^{(3–7)}
Runner-up	8.	8 July 2012	Denver, United States	Hard	(United States) Nicole Gibbs	2–6, 6–3, 4–6
Runner-up	9.	11 November 2012	Équeurdreville, France	Hard (i)	(Belgium) Alison Van Uytvanck	1–6, 6–3, 3–6
Runner-up	10.	10 February 2013	Rancho Mirage, United States	Hard	(Japan) Sachie Ishizu	3–6, 6–7^{(3–7)}
Runner-up	11.	28 July 2013	Lexington, United States	Hard	(United States) Shelby Rogers	4–6, 6–7^{(3–7)}
Winner	8.	29 September 2013	Clermont-Ferrand, France	Hard (i)	(Serbia) Doroteja Erić	3–6, 6–1, 6–4
Runner-up	12.	28 September 2014	Clermont-Ferrand, France	Hard (i)	(Netherlands) Richèl Hogenkamp	1–6, 3–6
Winner	9.	26 October 2014	Saguenay, Canada	Hard (i)	(Serbia) Jovana Jakšić	7–5, 6–3
Winner	10.	19 April 2015	Ponta Delgada, Portugal	Hard	(Spain) Georgina García Pérez	6–0, 6–1

=== Doubles: 27 (16–11) ===
Outcome	No.	Date	Tournament	Surface	Partner	Opponents	Score
Winner	1.	26 March 2001	Amiens, France	Clay	(France) Olivia Cappelletti	(Germany) Bianca Cremer (Croatia) Jelena Pandžić	7–5, 6–1
Winner	2.	4 July 2005	Le Touquet, France	Clay	(France) Alice Hall	(France) Karla Mraz (France) Virginie Pichet	7–5, 7–6^{(7–5)}
Runner-up	1.	15 January 2006	Stuttgart, Germany	Hard (i)	(France) Kildine Chevalier	(Croatia) Darija Jurak (Czech Republic) Renata Voráčová	2–6, 1–6
Runner-up	2.	26 March 2006	Amiens, France	Clay (i)	(France) Karla Mraz	(Russia) Olga Panova (Kazakhstan) Yaroslava Shvedova	4–6, 1–6
Winner	3.	27 January 2007	Grenoble, France	Hard	(France) Sherazad Benamar	(France) Stéphanie Rizzi (Poland) Karolina Kosińska	1–6, 7–5, 6–4
Winner	4.	17 March 2008	Tenerife, Spain	Hard	(France) Violette Huck	(Bosnia and Herzegovina) Mervana Jugić-Salkić (Israel) Tzipora Obziler	6–4, 6–3
Runner-up	3.	4 May 2008	Cagnes-sur-Mer, France	Clay	(Canada) Marie-Ève Pelletier	(Romania) Monica Niculescu (Czech Republic) Renata Voráčová	7–6^{(7–2)}, 1–6, [5–10]
Winner	5.	28 June 2008	Getxo, Spain	Clay	(United States) Story Tweedie-Yates	(Spain) Estrella Cabeza Candela (Spain) Sara del Barrio Aragón	6–3, 6–1
Winner	6.	20 September 2008	Madrid, Spain	Hard	(France) Irena Pavlovic	(Ukraine) Yuliya Beygelzimer (Russia) Anastasia Poltoratskaya	6–3, 6–4
Runner-up	4.	11 October 2008	Joué-lès-Tours, France	Hard	(France) Violette Huck	(Bosnia and Herzegovina) Mervana Jugić-Salkić (Germany) Kristina Barrois	2–6, 6–7
Winner	7.	3 May 2009	Cagnes-sur-Mer, France	Clay	(Canada) Marie-Ève Pelletier	(Georgia (country)) Anna Tatishvili (Argentina) Erica Krauth	6–4, 6–3
Runner-up	5.	29 August 2009	Bronx, United States	Hard	(Canada) Marie-Ève Pelletier	(Germany) Anna-Lena Grönefeld (United States) Vania King	0–6, 3–6
Winner	8.	1 November 2009	Poitiers, France	Hard (i)	(Canada) Marie-Ève Pelletier	(Poland) Marta Domachowska (Netherlands) Michaëlla Krajicek	6–3, 3–6, [10–3]
Winner	9.	16 July 2011	Woking, United Kingdom	Hard	(Czech Republic) Eva Hrdinová	(Finland) Emma Laine (United Kingdom) Melanie South	6–1, 3–6, [10–8]
Winner	10.	24 July 2011	Les Contamines, France	Hard	(Czech Republic) Eva Hrdinová	(Croatia) Maria Abramović (Italy) Nicole Clerico	6–3, 6–2
Winner	11.	28 August 2011	Istanbul, Turkey	Hard	(Czech Republic) Eva Hrdinová	(Austria) Sandra Klemenschits (France) Irena Pavlovic	6–4, 7–5
Runner-up	6.	6 November 2011	Nantes, France	Hard	(Czech Republic) Eva Hrdinová	(France) Stéphanie Foretz (France) Kristina Mladenovic	0–6, 4–6
Runner-up	7.	28 January 2012	Andrézieux-Bouthéon, France	Hard (i)	(Czech Republic) Eva Hrdinová	(Czech Republic) Karolína Plíšková (Czech Republic) Kristýna Plíšková	4–6, 6–4, [5–10]
Runner-up	8.	24 March 2012	Bath, United Kingdom	Hard (i)	(United Kingdom) Melanie South	(Germany) Tatjana Maria (Liechtenstein) Stephanie Vogt	3–6, 6–3, [3–10]
Winner	12.	14 April 2012	Pelham, United States	Clay	(Canada) Marie-Ève Pelletier	(Russia) Elena Bovina (Russia) Ekaterina Bychkova	7–5, 6–4
Winner	13.	13 October 2012	Joué-lès-Tours, France	Hard (i)	(France) Séverine Beltrame	(Poland) Justyna Jegiołka (Latvia) Diāna Marcinkēviča	7–5, 6–4
Winner	14.	15 June 2013	Nottingham, United Kingdom	Grass	(France) Stéphanie Foretz Gacon	(Israel) Julia Glushko (Japan) Erika Sema	6–2, 6–4
Runner-up	9.	20 July 2013	Granby, Canada	Hard	(United Kingdom) Emily Webley-Smith	(United States) Lena Litvak (Canada) Carol Zhao	5–7, 4–6
Winner	15.	13 October 2013	Joué-lès-Tours, France	Hard (i)	(Croatia) Ana Vrljić	(Czech Republic) Andrea Hlaváčková (Netherlands) Michaëlla Krajicek	6–3, 4–6, [15–13]
Winner	16.	8 February 2015	Midland, United States	Hard (i)	(United Kingdom) Emily Webley-Smith	(United States) Jacqueline Cako (United States) Sachia Vickery	4–6, 7–6, [11–9]
Runner-up	10.	11 April 2015	Croissy-Beaubourg, France	Hard (i)	(France) Mathilde Johansson	(United Kingdom) Jocelyn Rae (United Kingdom) Anna Smith	6–7^{(5–7)}, 6–7^{(2–7)}
Runner-up	11.	10 May 2015	Tunis, Tunisia	Clay	(France) Stéphanie Foretz	(Argentina) María Irigoyen (Poland) Paula Kania	1–6, 3–6
