= 2015 Jiangxi International Women's Tennis Open – Singles =

Singles
- 2015 Jiangxi International Women's Tennis Open

Final
- Champion: (Serbia) Jelena Janković
- Runner-up: (Chinese Taipei) Chang Kai-chen
- Score: 6–3, 7–6^{(8–6)}

Details
- Draw: 32
- Seeds: 8

Events
Singles	Doubles
- Jiangxi International Women's Tennis Open

Peng Shuai was the defending champion but chose not to participate.

Jelena Janković won the title by defeating Chang Kai-chen in the final, 6–3, 7–6^{(8–6)}.

== Seeds ==
1. (Serbia) Jelena Janković (champion)
2. (China) Zheng Saisai (first round)
3. (China) Wang Qiang (second round)
4. (Chinese Taipei) Hsieh Su-wei (first round)
5. (China) Duan Yingying (quarterfinals)
6. (Thailand) Luksika Kumkhum (first round)
7. (China) Wang Yafan (quarterfinals)
8. (China) Liu Fangzhou (quarterfinals)

== Main draw ==
Key

- Q = Qualifier
- WC = Wild card
- LL = Lucky loser
- Alt = Alternate
- ITF = ITF entry
- PR = Protected ranking
- SR = Special ranking
- SE = Special exempt
- JE = Junior exempt
- JR = Junior Accelerator Programme entrant
- CO = College Accelerator Programme entrant
- NG = Next Gen Accelerator Program entrant
- w/o = Walkover
- r = Retired
- d = Defaulted

=== Finals ===
Semifinals
1/WC	(Serbia) Jelena Janković	6	6
(China) Han Xinyun	1	2
(Chinese Taipei) Chang Kai-chen	3	7^{7}	7^{7}
(China) Lu Jiajing	6	6^{3}	6^{3}

Final
1/WC	(Serbia) Jelena Janković	6	7^{8}
(Chinese Taipei) Chang Kai-chen	3	6^{6}

=== Top half ===
First round
1/WC	(Serbia) J Janković	6	6
(Japan) R Sawayanagi	2	1
(India) A Raina	2	6^{9}
(China) C Liu	6	7^{11}
Q	(Japan) M Ninomiya	2	6	5
(Hong Kong) L Zhang	6	3	7
Q	(Australia) A Bai	2	1
5	(China) Y Duan	6	6
3	(China) Q Wang	6	6
(South Korea) S-j Jang	3	2
(China) X Han	6	6
WC	(China) W Zheng	0	2
(China) Y Xu	3	1
(Japan) M Kato	6	6
(China) S Zhang	1	4
8	(China) F Liu	6	6

Second round
1/WC	(Serbia) J Janković	6	6
(China) C Liu	3	1
(Hong Kong) L Zhang	6	3	3
5	(China) Y Duan	3	6	6
3	(China) Q Wang	6^{0}	3
(China) X Han	7^{7}	6
(Japan) M Kato	0	2
8	(China) F Liu	6	6

Quarterfinals
1/WC	(Serbia) J Janković	7^{7}	6
5	(China) Y Duan	6^{3}	0
(China) X Han	5	6	6
8	(China) F Liu	7	2	1

Semifinals
1/WC	(Serbia) J Janković	6	6
(China) X Han	1	2

=== Bottom half ===
First round
7	(China) Y Wang	6	6
Q	(Japan) K Okamura	1	1
Q	(Japan) E Sema	6	6
WC	(China) X Gao	2	3
(China) K Zhang	6	6
(Russia) E Bychkova	3	3
(Chinese Taipei) K-c Chang	6	6
4	(Chinese Taipei) S-w Hsieh	3	3
6	(Thailand) L Kumkhum	5	3
(South Korea) N-l Han	7	6
(China) Yu Zhang	3	6	7^{7}
WC	(China) C Liang	6	2	6^{4}
(China) J Lu	3	6	6
WC	(China) Yi Zhang	6	1	4
(Japan) J Namigata	6	6
2	(China) S Zheng	4	2

Second round
7	(China) Y Wang	6	6
Q	(Japan) E Sema	2	2
(China) K Zhang	6	1	3
(Chinese Taipei) K-c Chang	3	6	6
(South Korea) N-l Han	6	6
(China) Yu Zhang	4	3
(China) J Lu	6	6^{10}	7^{7}
(Japan) J Namigata	2	7^{12}	6^{1}

Quarterfinals
7	(China) Y Wang	3	6	4
(Chinese Taipei) K-c Chang	6	1	6
(South Korea) N-l Han	7	4	4
(China) J Lu	5	6	6

Semifinals
(Chinese Taipei) K-c Chang	3	7^{7}	7^{7}
(China) J Lu	6	6^{3}	6^{3}
