= 2015 OEC Taipei WTA Challenger =

- Date: 16–22 November
- Edition: 8th
- Category: WTA 125K series
- Prize money: $115,000
- Surface: Carpet (indoor)
- Location: Taipei, Taiwan

Champions

Singles
- (Hungary) Tímea Babos

Doubles
- (Japan) Kanae Hisami / (Japan) Kotomi Takahata
- Taipei Open

The 2015 OEC Taipei WTA Challenger was a professional tennis tournament played on indoor carpet courts. It was the 8th edition of OEC's Taipei Open tournaments, and part of the 2015 WTA 125K series. It took place in Taipei, Taiwan, on 16–22 November 2015.

== Singles entrants ==
=== Seeds ===
Country	Player	Rank^{1}	Seed
JPN	Misaki Doi	60	1
KAZ	Yaroslava Shvedova	82	2
RUS	Evgeniya Rodina	84	3
HUN	Tímea Babos	85	4
BEL	Kirsten Flipkens	93	5
ROU	Patricia Maria Țig	115	6
SUI	Stefanie Vögele	122	7
CHN	Wang Yafan	135	8

- ^{1} Rankings as of 9 November 2015.

=== Other entrants ===
The following players received wildcards into the singles main draw:

- (Chinese Taipei) Chan Chin-wei
- (Chinese Taipei) Cho I-hsuan
- (Chinese Taipei) Hsu Chieh-yu
- (Chinese Taipei) Hsu Ching-wen

The following players received entry from the qualifying draw:

- (Japan) Hiroko Kuwata
- (Thailand) Nicha Lertpitaksinchai
- (Croatia) Tena Lukas
- (Japan) Kotomi Takahata

== Doubles entrants ==
=== Seeds ===
Country	Player	Country	Player	Rank	Seed
CHN	Han Xinyun	CHN	Zhang Kailin	199	1
TPE	Chan Chin-wei	JPN	Junri Namigata	215	2
RUS	Marina Melnikova	BEL	Elise Mertens	284	3
FRA	Amandine Hesse	JPN	Hiroko Kuwata	301	4

- ^{1} Rankings as of 9 November 2015.

=== Other entrants ===
The following pairs received wildcards into the doubles main draw:

- (Chinese Taipei) Chen Yen-ling / (Chinese Taipei) Juan Ting-fei
- (Chinese Taipei) Cho Yi-tsen / (Chinese Taipei) Wu Fang-hsien
- (Chinese Taipei) Lee Pei-chi / (Chinese Taipei) Yang Chia-hsien
- (Chinese Taipei) Lee Yang / (Chinese Taipei) Shih Hsin-yuan

== Champions ==
=== Singles ===
- (Hungary) Tímea Babos def. (Japan) Misaki Doi 7–5, 6–3

=== Doubles ===
- (Japan) Kanae Hisami / (Japan) Kotomi Takahata def. (Russia) Marina Melnikova / (Belgium) Elise Mertens 6–1, 6–2
