= 2015 Hua Hin Championships – Women's doubles =

Women's doubles
- 2015 Hua Hin Championships

Final
- Champions: (China) Liang Chen (China) Wang Yafan
- Runners-up: (Thailand) Varatchaya Wongteanchai (China) Yang Zhaoxuan
- Score: 6–3, 6–4

Events
Singles	men	women
Doubles	men	women
- Hua Hin Championships

This was the first edition of the tournament. Liang Chen and Wang Yafan won the title, defeating Varatchaya Wongteanchai and Yang Zhaoxuan in the final 6–3, 6–4.

== Seeds ==
1. (China) Liang Chen / (China) Wang Yafan (champions)
2. (Japan) Shuko Aoyama / (Japan) Makoto Ninomiya (quarterfinals)
3. (China) Han Xinyun / (China) Zhang Kailin (semifinals)
4. (Chinese Taipei) Chan Chin-wei / (Russia) Ksenia Lykina (first round)

== Draw ==
Key

- Q = Qualifier
- WC = Wild card
- LL = Lucky loser
- Alt = Alternate
- ITF = ITF entry
- PR = Protected ranking
- SR = Special ranking
- SE = Special exempt
- JE = Junior exempt
- JR = Junior Accelerator Programme entrant
- CO = College Accelerator Programme entrant
- NG = Next Gen Accelerator Program entrant
- w/o = Walkover
- r = Retired
- d = Defaulted

First round
1	(China) C Liang (China) Y Wang	7	7
(Belgium) K Flipkens (Thailand) N Lertcheewakarn	5	5
(Japan) N Hibino (United Kingdom) E Webley-Smith	4	4
(Thailand) N Lertpitaksinchai (Thailand) Pe Plipuech	6	6
3	(China) X Han (China) K Zhang	3	6	[10]
(China) C Liu (China) Jia Lu	6	3	[6]
WC	(Thailand) K Buayam (Thailand) N Luangnam	5	7^{7}	[11]
(South Korea) S-j Jang (China) Jin Lu	7	6^{2}	[9]
(Germany) C Daniels (Russia) E Rodina	6	6
(Uzbekistan) A Amanmuradova (Romania) E Bogdan	1	1
(United States) A Glatch (China) Y Xu	6	7^{7}
4	(Chinese Taipei) C-w Chan (Russia) K Lykina	3	6^{2}
(Thailand) Vara Wongteanchai (China) Z Yang	6	6
(Thailand) L Kumkhum (Thailand) Varu Wongteanchai	1	1
(Japan) M Doi (Japan) K Nara	6	1	[6]
2	(Japan) S Aoyama (Japan) M Ninomiya	2	6	[10]

Quarterfinals
1	(China) C Liang (China) Y Wang	7^{7}	6
(Thailand) N Lertpitaksinchai (Thailand) Pe Plipuech	6^{4}	3
3	(China) X Han (China) K Zhang	6^{3}	6	[10]
WC	(Thailand) K Buayam (Thailand) N Luangnam	7^{7}	4	[8]
(Germany) C Daniels (Russia) E Rodina	3	2
(United States) A Glatch (China) Y Xu	6	6
(Thailand) Vara Wongteanchai (China) Z Yang	6	6
2	(Japan) S Aoyama (Japan) M Ninomiya	4	3

Semifinals
1	(China) C Liang (China) Y Wang	6	6^{5}	[11]
3	(China) X Han (China) K Zhang	3	7^{7}	[9]
(United States) A Glatch (China) Y Xu	4	0
(Thailand) Vara Wongteanchai (China) Z Yang	6	6

Final
1	(China) C Liang (China) Y Wang	6	6
(Thailand) Vara Wongteanchai (China) Z Yang	3	4
