= 2015 Hua Hin Championships – Women's singles =

Women's singles
- 2015 Hua Hin Championships

Final
- Champion: (Kazakhstan) Yaroslava Shvedova
- Runner-up: (Japan) Naomi Osaka
- Score: 6–4, 6–7^{(8–10)}, 6–4

Events
Singles	men	women
Doubles	men	women
- Hua Hin Championships

This was the first edition of the tournament.
Yaroslava Shvedova won the title, defeating Naomi Osaka in the final 6–4, 6–7^{(8–10)}, 6–4.

== Seeds ==
1. (Japan) Misaki Doi (first round)
2. (China) Zheng Saisai (second round)
3. (Japan) Nao Hibino (semifinals)
4. (Kazakhstan) Yaroslava Shvedova (champion)
5. (Japan) Kurumi Nara (second round)
6. (Russia) Evgeniya Rodina (first round)
7. (Hungary) Tímea Babos (first round)
8. (Belgium) Kirsten Flipkens (first round)

== Draw ==
Key

- Q = Qualifier
- WC = Wild card
- LL = Lucky loser
- Alt = Alternate
- ITF = ITF entry
- PR = Protected ranking
- SR = Special ranking
- SE = Special exempt
- JE = Junior exempt
- JR = Junior Accelerator Programme entrant
- CO = College Accelerator Programme entrant
- NG = Next Gen Accelerator Program entrant
- w/o = Walkover
- r = Retired
- d = Defaulted

=== Finals ===
Semifinals
(Japan) Naomi Osaka	4	6	6
3	(Japan) Nao Hibino	6	3	1
4	(Kazakhstan) Yaroslava Shvedova	6^{4}	7^{7}	6
(China) Wang Qiang	7^{7}	6^{4}	4

Final
(Japan) Naomi Osaka	4	7^{10}	4
4	(Kazakhstan) Yaroslava Shvedova	6	6^{8}	6

=== Top half ===
First round
1	(Japan) M Doi	4	4
(China) F Liu	6	6
(South Korea) S-j Jang	6	3	2
Q	(Uzbekistan) A Amanmuradova	4	6	6
(Romania) PM Țig	6	0
(China) L Zhu	4	0^{r}
(Japan) N Osaka	3	7	6
6	(Russia) E Rodina	6	5	0
3	(Japan) N Hibino	6	6
(United States) A Glatch	1	3
Q	(Japan) S Aoyama	7	5	2
(Russia) E Kulichkova	5	7	6
(China) X Han	4	1
WC	(Thailand) V Wongteanchai	6	6
(Thailand) L Kumkhum	5	7	6
8	(Belgium) K Flipkens	7	5	4

Second round
(China) F Liu	6	6
Q	(Uzbekistan) A Amanmuradova	2	1
(Romania) PM Țig	7^{8}	2	1
(Japan) N Osaka	6^{6}	6	6
3	(Japan) N Hibino	6	6
(Russia) E Kulichkova	4	4
WC	(Thailand) V Wongteanchai	6	3	3
(Thailand) L Kumkhum	3	6	6

Quarterfinals
(China) F Liu	7^{7}	1	3
(Japan) N Osaka	6^{4}	6	6
3	(Japan) N Hibino	6	6
(Thailand) L Kumkhum	4	3

Semifinals
(Japan) N Osaka	4	6	6
3	(Japan) N Hibino	6	3	1

=== Bottom half ===
First round
5	(Japan) K Nara	6	6
(China) K Zhang	2	4
(Japan) R Ozaki	4	2
(China) Y Duan	6	6
Q	(China) C Liu	6^{6}	7	6
WC	(Thailand) N Lertcheewakarn	7^{8}	5	4
WC	(Thailand) K Buayam	2	6	1
4	(Kazakhstan) Y Shvedova	6	3	6
7	(Hungary) T Babos	2	3
(China) Y Wang	6	6
(China) Q Wang	6	7
(China) Z Yang	3	5
(Chinese Taipei) S-w Hsieh	7	6
WC	(Thailand) B Thamchaiwat	5	3
Q	(China) J Lu	2	1
2	(China) S Zheng	6	6

Second round
5	(Japan) K Nara	4	6	1
(China) Y Duan	6	4	6
Q	(China) C Liu	6^{4}	4
4	(Kazakhstan) Y Shvedova	7^{7}	6
(China) Y Wang	3	1
(China) Q Wang	6	6
(Chinese Taipei) S-w Hsieh	6	2	6
2	(China) S Zheng	1	6	2

Quarterfinals
(China) Y Duan	2	4
4	(Kazakhstan) Y Shvedova	6	6
(China) Q Wang	6	6
(Chinese Taipei) S-w Hsieh	3	2

Semifinals
4	(Kazakhstan) Y Shvedova	6^{4}	7^{7}	6
(China) Q Wang	7^{7}	6^{4}	4

== Qualifying ==
=== Seeds ===
1. (China) Xu Yifan (qualifying competition)
2. (China) Lu Jiajing (qualified)
3. (Japan) Shuko Aoyama (qualified)
4. (China) Liu Chang (qualified)
5. (China) Lu Jingjing (qualifying competition)
6. (Uzbekistan) Akgul Amanmuradova (qualified)
7. (United Kingdom) Emily Webley-Smith (first round)
8. (Germany) Carolin Daniels (first round)

=== Qualifiers ===
1. (Uzbekistan) Akgul Amanmuradova
2. (China) Lu Jiajing
3. (Japan) Shuko Aoyama
4. (China) Liu Chang

=== Draw ===
==== First qualifier ====
First round
1	(China) Xu Yifan	6	6
(Romania) Elena Bogdan	4	1
WC	(Thailand) Tamachan Momkoonthod	2	4
6	(Uzbekistan) Akgul Amanmuradova	6	6

Qualifying competition
1	(China) Xu Yifan	6^{6}	6	4
6	(Uzbekistan) Akgul Amanmuradova	7^{8}	2	6

==== Second qualifier ====
First round
2	(China) Lu Jiajing	6	6
WC	(Thailand) Plobrung Plipuech	2	0
(Russia) Ksenia Lykina	6	3	6
7	(United Kingdom) Emily Webley-Smith	2	6	3

Qualifying competition
2	(China) Lu Jiajing	7	6
(Russia) Ksenia Lykina	5	4

==== Third qualifier ====
First round
3	(Japan) Shuko Aoyama	6	6
(Japan) Naoko Eto	1	1
(Thailand) Nudnida Luangnam	7	6
8	(Germany) Carolin Daniels	5	2

Qualifying competition
3	(Japan) Shuko Aoyama	7	1	6
(Thailand) Nudnida Luangnam	5	6	4

==== Fourth qualifier ====
First round
4	(China) Liu Chang	6	6
(Thailand) Peangtarn Plipuech	1	0
(Thailand) Nicha Lertpitaksinchai	6	2	1
5	(China) Lu Jingjing	0	6	6

Qualifying competition
4	(China) Liu Chang	3	6	7
5	(China) Lu Jingjing	6	3	5
