= Chang Kai-chen =

Taiwanese tennis player

Chang Kai-chen 張凱貞
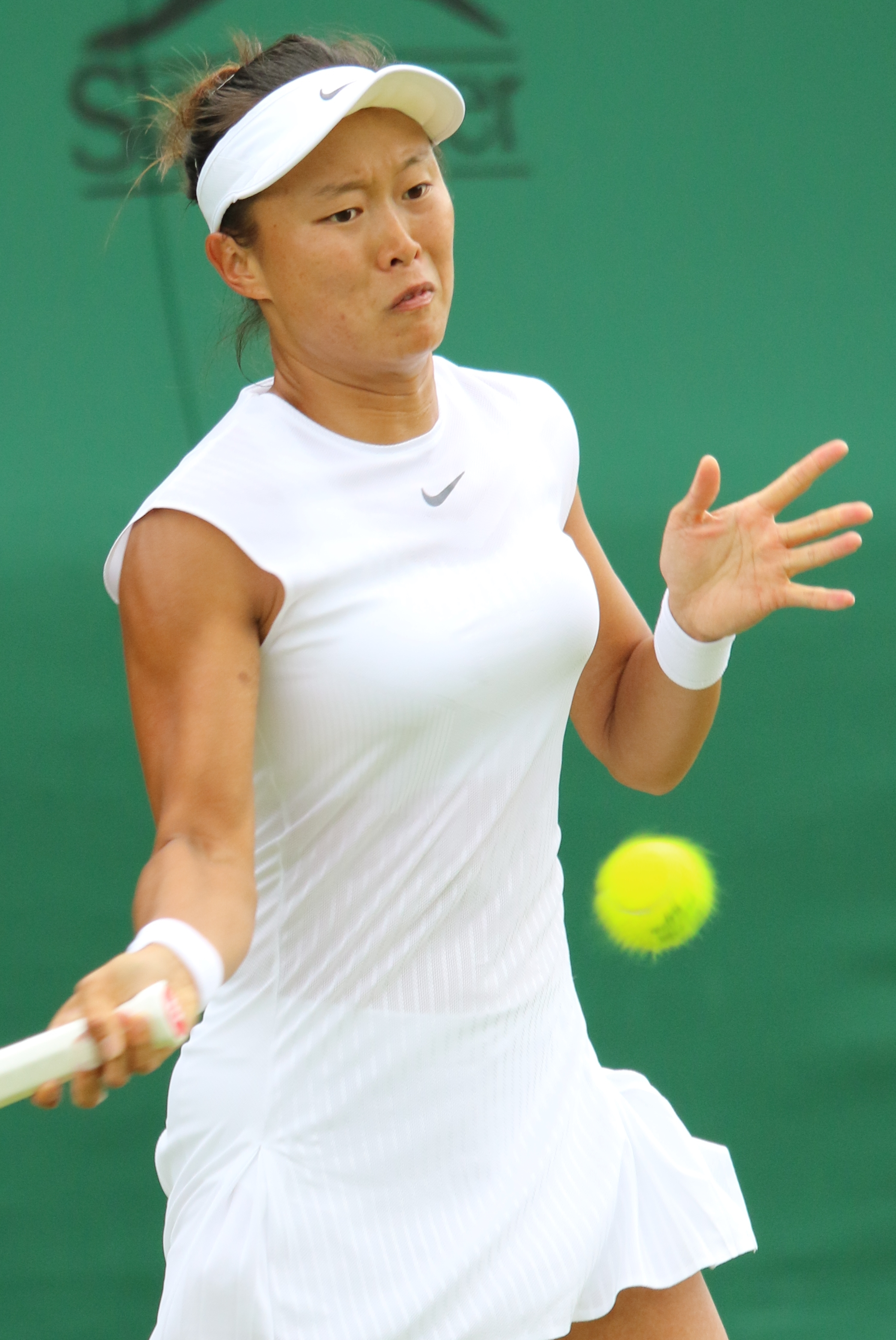
- Chang at the 2017 Wimbledon Championships
- Country (sports): Chinese Taipei
- Residence: Taipei City
- Born: 13 January 1991 (age 35) Taoyuan City, Taiwan
- Height: 1.67 m (5 ft 6 in)
- Turned pro: November 2007
- Plays: Right (two-handed backhand)
- Prize money: $1,017,089

Singles
- Career record: 287–230
- Career titles: 0 WTA, 6 ITF
- Highest ranking: No. 82 (5 July 2010)

Grand Slam singles results
- Australian Open: 2R (2012, 2015)
- French Open: 1R (2010)
- Wimbledon: 2R (2010)
- US Open: 2R (2009, 2010)

Doubles
- Career record: 188–109
- Career titles: 4 WTA, 1 WTA 125
- Highest ranking: No. 65 (11 February 2013)

Grand Slam doubles results
- Australian Open: 1R (2013)
- French Open: 1R (2010, 2011)
- Wimbledon: 2R (2010, 2017)
- US Open: 1R (2010)

Grand Slam mixed doubles results
- Australian Open: 2R (2015)

Team competitions
- Fed Cup: 10–8
Medal record
Women's Tennis
Representing Chinese Taipei
Event	1st	2nd	3rd
Asian Games	0	2	0
Universiade	3	0	2
Total	3	2	2
Asian Games
Silver medal – second place	2010 Guangzhou	Women's team
Silver medal – second place	2010 Guangzhou	Women's doubles
Universiade
Gold medal – first place	2017 Taipei	Women's team
Bronze medal – third place	2017 Taipei	Women's singles
Gold medal – first place	2015 Gwangju	Women's singles
Gold medal – first place	2015 Gwangju	Women's team
Bronze medal – third place	2015 Gwangju	Mixed doubles

Chang Kai-chen (Chinese: 張凱貞; pinyin: Zhāng Kǎizhēn; Taiwanese Mandarin: [tsáŋ kʰài tsə́n]; born January 13, 1991), also known as Kelly Chang, is a Taiwanese former professional tennis player.

== Career ==
Her father is Chang Chin-lai and mother is Jun Yu-mei; she has two older brothers, Yao-lun and Yao-chung (both play tennis). Born and raised in Taiwan, an hour from Taipei, Chang splits training between Taiwan and Delray Beach, Florida (International Tennis Academy). She started playing tennis at age six when introduced to sport by brothers at local tennis club. She is an aggressive baseliner whose favorite shot is backhand, her favorite surface is hardcourt.

She qualified for the 2009 US Open, where she beat 25th seed Kaia Kanepi 6–0, 2–6, 6–2 in her first-round match. At the 2009 Pan Pacific Open, Chang defeated world No. 1, Dinara Safina, 7–6, 4–6, 7–5 in her second-round match.

In July 2010, she reached her career-high singles ranking of world No. 82. In February 2013, she peaked at No. 65 in the WTA doubles rankings.

Playing for Chinese Taipei Fed Cup team, Chang has a win–loss record of 10–8.

== Grand Slam performance timelines ==
Key
W	F	SF	QF	#R	RR	Q#	P#	DNQ	A	Z#	PO	G	S	B	NMS	NTI	P	NH

(W) winner; (F) finalist; (SF) semifinalist; (QF) quarterfinalist; (#R) rounds 4, 3, 2, 1; (RR) round-robin stage; (Q#) qualification round; (P#) preliminary round; (DNQ) did not qualify; (A) absent; (Z#) Davis/Fed Cup Zonal Group (with number indication) or (PO) play-off; (G) gold, (S) silver or (B) bronze Olympic/Paralympic medal; (NMS) not a Masters tournament; (NTI) not a Tier I tournament; (P) postponed; (NH) not held; (SR) strike rate (events won / competed); (W–L) win–loss record.
To avoid confusion and double counting, these charts are updated at the conclusion of a tournament or when the player's participation has ended.

=== Singles ===
Tournament	2009	2010	2011	2012	2013	2014	2015	2016	2017	W–L
Australian Open	A	1R	1R	2R	1R	A	2R	Q2	Q2	2–5
French Open	A	1R	Q2	1R	Q1	A	A	Q1	Q2	0–2
Wimbledon	A	2R	1R	A	A	A	A	Q3	1R	1–3
US Open	2R	2R	A	A	A	A	Q1	Q1	A	2–2
Win–loss	1–1	2–4	0–2	1–2	0–1	0–0	1–1	0–0	0–1	5–12

=== Doubles ===
Tournament	2010	2011	2012	2013	2017	2018	2019	W–L
Australian Open				1R			1R	0–2
French Open	1R	1R		1R				0–3
Wimbledon	2R	1R			2R			2–3
US Open	1R							0–1
Win–loss	1–3	0–2	0–0	0–2	1–1	0–0	0–1	2–9

== WTA career finals ==
=== Singles: 1 (runner–up) ===
Legend Grand Slam tournaments Premier M & Premier 5 Premier International (0–1)	Finals by surface Hard (0–1) Clay (0–0) Grass (0–0) Carpet (0–0)

Result	W–L	Date	Tournament	Tier	Surface	Opponent	Score
Loss	0–1	Oct 2012	Japan Women's Open	International	Hard	(United Kingdom) Heather Watson	5–7, 7–5, 6–7^{(4–7)}

=== Doubles: 4 (4 titles) ===
Legend Grand Slam tournaments Premier M & Premier 5 Premier International (4–0)	Finals by surface Hard (4–0) Grass (0–0) Clay (0–0) Carpet (0–0)

Result	W–L	Date	Tournament	Tier	Surface	Partner	Opponents	Score
Win	1–0	Oct 2010	Japan Women's Open	International	Hard	(United States) Lilia Osterloh	(Japan) Shuko Aoyama (Japan) Rika Fujiwara	6–0, 6–3
Win	2–0	Mar 2012	Malaysian Open	International	Hard	(Chinese Taipei) Chuang Chia-jung	(Chinese Taipei) Chan Hao-ching (Japan) Rika Fujiwara	7–5, 6–4
Win	3–0	Aug 2012	Washington Open	International	Hard	(Japan) Shuko Aoyama	(United States) Irina Falconi (South Africa) Chanelle Scheepers	7–5, 6–2
Win	4–0	Mar 2013	Malaysian Open	International	Hard	(Japan) Shuko Aoyama	(Slovakia) Janette Husárová (China) Zhang Shuai	6–7^{(4–7)}, 7–6^{(7–4)}, [14–12]

== WTA 125 tournament finals ==
=== Singles: 3 (3 runner-ups) ===
Result	W–L	Date	Tournament	Surface	Opponent	Score
Loss	0–1	Nov 2012	Taipei Challenger, Taiwan	Carpet (i)	(France) Kristina Mladenovic	4–6, 3–6
Loss	0–2	Aug 2015	Jiangxi International, China	Hard	(Serbia) Jelena Janković	3–6, 6–7^{(6)}
Loss	0–3	Nov 2016	Taipei Challenger, Taiwan	Hard (i)	(Russia) Evgeniya Rodina	4–6, 3–6

=== Doubles: 4 (1 title, 3 runner-ups) ===
Result	W–L	Date	Tournament	Surface	Partner	Opponents	Score
Loss	0–1	Nov 2012	Taipei Challenger, Taiwan	Carpet (i)	(Belarus) Olga Govortsova	(Chinese Taipei) Chan Hao-ching (France) Kristina Mladenovic	7–5, 2–6, [8–10]
Loss	0–2	Nov 2014	Taipei Challenger, Taiwan	Carpet (i)	(Chinese Taipei) Chuang Chia-jung	(Chinese Taipei) Chan Hao-ching (Chinese Taipei) Chan Yung-jan	4–6, 3–6
Win	1–2	Aug 2015	Jiangxi International, China	Hard	(China) Zheng Saisai	(Chinese Taipei) Chan Chin-wei (China) Wang Yafan	6–3, 4–6, [10–3]
Loss	1–3	Nov 2016	Taipei Challenger, Taiwan	Hard (i)	(Chinese Taipei) Chuang Chia-jung	(Russia) Natela Dzalamidze (Russia) Veronika Kudermetova	6–4, 3–6, [5–10]

== ITF Circuit finals ==
Legend
$100,000 tournaments
$75,000 tournaments
$50/60,000 tournaments
$25,000 tournaments
$10,000 tournaments

=== Singles: 11 (6 titles, 5 runner–ups) ===
Result	W–L	Date	Tournament	Tier	Surface	Opponent	Score
Loss	0–1	Nov 2007	ITF Manila, Philippines	10,000	Clay	(Switzerland) Nicole Riner	3–6, 2–6
Loss	0–2	Feb 2008	ITF Mildura, Australia	25,000	Grass	(New Zealand) Marina Erakovic	3–6, 1–6
Win	1–2	May 2008	Kurume Cup, Japan	50,000	Carpet	(Russia) Alexandra Panova	7–5, 6–3
Loss	1–3	May 2009	Fukuoka International, Japan	50,000	Grass	(Austria) Nikola Hofmanova	3–6, 2–6
Win	2–3	Oct 2011	Kōfu International Open, Japan	50,000	Hard	(Luxembourg) Mandy Minella	6–4, 1–6, 6–4
Loss	2–4	Aug 2014	ITF Tsukuba, Japan	25,000	Hard	(Japan) Junri Namigata	0–6, 6–7
Win	3–4	Mar 2015	ITF Jiangmen, China	10,000	Hard	(China) Zhao Di	6–2, 6–1
Loss	3–5	May 2015	ITF Xuzhou, China	50,000	Hard	(Thailand) Luksika Kumkhum	6–1, 5–7, 1–6
Win	4–5	Sep 2015	Zhuhai Open, China	50,000	Hard	(China) Zhang Yuxuan	4–6, 6–1, 7–6^{(0)}
Win	5–5	Oct 2016	ITF Iizuka, Japan	25,000	Hard	(South Korea) Jang Su-jeong	6–3, 6–4
Win	6–5	Oct 2016	Suzhou Ladies Open, China	50,000	Hard	(China) Wang Yafan	4–6, 6–2, 6–1

=== Doubles: 24 (16 titles, 8 runner–ups) ===
Result	W–L	Date	Tournament	Tier	Surface	Partner	Opponents	Score
Loss	0–1	Jul 2006	ITF Bangkok, Thailand	10,000	Hard	(Vietnam) Nguyễn Thùy Dung	(Thailand) Nungnadda Wannasuk (Thailand) Varatchaya Wongteanchai	4–6, 4–6
Loss	0–2	Mar 2008	ITF Sorrento, Australia	25,000	Hard	(Chinese Taipei) Hwang I-hsuan	(Australia) Monique Adamczak (United Kingdom) Melanie South	2–6, 4–6
Win	1–2	May 2008	Kurume Cup, Japan	50,000	Carpet	(Chinese Taipei) Hwang I-hsuan	(Japan) Erika Sema (Japan) Yurika Sema	6–3, 2–6, [10–6]
Loss	1–3	May 2008	ITF Gunma, Japan	25,000	Carpet	(Chinese Taipei) Hwang I-hsuan	(Japan) Erika Sema (Japan) Yurika Sema	3–6, 6–2, [7–10]
Win	2–3	Nov 2008	Pune Championships, India	25,000	Hard	(Chinese Taipei) Hwang I-hsuan	(Romania) Elora Dabija (Serbia) Bojana Jovanovski	5–7, 6–2, [10–7]
Win	3–3	Apr 2009	ITF Changwon, South Korea	25,000	Hard	(Chinese Taipei) Chen Yi	(United Kingdom) Elena Baltacha (United Kingdom) Amanda Elliott	6–4, 6–1
Win	4–3	Apr 2009	ITF Gimcheon, South Korea	25,000	Hard	(Chinese Taipei) Chen Yi	(South Korea) Chang Kyung-mi (South Korea) Lee Jin-a	6–1, 7–5
Loss	4–4	May 2009	Kurume Cup, Japan	50,000	Carpet	(Japan) Ayaka Maekawa	(China) Lu Jingjing (China) Sun Shengnan	3–6, 2–6
Win	5–4	Jul 2009	Lexington Challenger, United States	50,000	Hard	(United States) Tetiana Luzhanska	(United States) Jacqueline Cako (United States) Alison Riske	6–3, 6–2
Wi	6–4	Aug 2010	Vancouver Open, Canada	75,000	Hard	(Canada) Heidi El Tabakh	(United States) Irina Falconi (United States) Amanda Fink	3–6, 6–3, [10–4]
Win	7–4	Nov 2010	Taipei Ladies Open, Taiwan	100,000	Carpet (i)	(Chinese Taipei) Chuang Chia-jung	(India) Sania Mirza (Chinese Taipei) Hsieh Su-wei	6–4, 6–2
Win	8–4	Sep 2012	Ningbo International, China	100,000	Hard	(Japan) Shuko Aoyama	(United States) Tetiana Luzhanska (China) Zheng Saisai	6–2, 7–5
Win	9–4	May 2015	ITF Wuhan, China	50,000	Hard	(China) Han Xinyun	(China) Liu Chang (China) Lu Jiajing	6–0, 6–3
Win	10–4	May 2015	ITF Xuzhou, China	50,000	Hard	(China) Han Xinyun	(China) Cao Siqi (China) Zhou Mingjun	6–3, 6–2
Loss	10–5	Jul 2016	ITF Wuhan, China	50,000	Hard	(China) Duan Yingying	(Japan) Shuko Aoyama (Japan) Makoto Ninomiya	4–6, 4–6
Win	11–5	May 2017	Open de Cagnes-sur-Mer, France	100,000	Clay	(Chinese Taipei) Hsieh Su-wei	(Romania) Raluca Olaru (Czech Republic) Renata Voráčová	7–5, 6–1
Win	12–5	May 2017	Open Saint-Gaudens, France	60,000	Clay	(China) Han Xinyun	(Paraguay) Montserrat González (Spain) Sílvia Soler Espinosa	7–5, 6–1
Loss	12–6	Jun 2017	Surbiton Trophy, UK	100,000	Grass	(New Zealand) Marina Erakovic	(Australia) Monique Adamczak (Australia) Storm Sanders	4–6, 5–7
Loss	12–7	Jun 2017	Manchester Trophy, UK	100,000	Grass	(New Zealand) Marina Erakovic	(Poland) Magdalena Fręch (Belgium) An-Sophie Mestach	4–6, 6–7^{(5)}
Loss	12–8	May 2018	ITF Incheon, Korea	25,000	Hard	(Chinese Taipei) Hsu Ching-wen	(South Korea) Han Na-lae (South Korea) Kim Na-ri	0–5 ret.
Win	13–8	Jun 2018	ITF Daegu, Korea	25,000	Hard	(Chinese Taipei) Hsu Ching-wen	(Japan) Shiho Akita (Japan) Misaki Doi	2–1 ret.
Win	14–8	Feb 2019	Launceston International, Australia	60,000	Hard	(Chinese Taipei) Hsu Ching-wen	(Australia) Alexandra Bozovic (Australia) Isabelle Wallace	6–2, 6–4
Win	15–8	Mar 2019	Kōfu International Open, Japan	25,000	Hard	(Chinese Taipei) Hsu Ching-wen	(United States) Emina Bektas (United Kingdom) Tara Moore	6–1, 6–3
Win	16–8	Mar 2019	ITF Kōfu, Japan	25,000	Hard	(Chinese Taipei) Hsu Ching-wen	(China) Xun Fangying (China) You Xiaodi	6–3, 6–4

== Wins over top 10 players ==
#	Player	Rank	Event	Surface	Rd	Score
2009
1.	(Russia) Dinara Safina	1	Pan Pacific Open	Hard	2R	7–6^{(5)}, 4–6, 7–5
2012
2.	(France) Marion Bartoli	10	Guangzhou Open	Hard	1R	4–3 ret.
3.	(Australia) Samantha Stosur	5	Japan Women's Open	Hard	SF	6–4, 4–6, 7–6^{(3)}
2016
4.	(Italy) Roberta Vinci	10	Malaysian Open	Hard	1R	5–7, 6–2, 6–1
