= Kotomi Takahata (tennis) =

Japanese tennis player (born 1989)

Kotomi Takahata 高畑 寿弥
- Country (sports): Japan
- Residence: Kawanishi, Japan
- Born: 17 November 1989 (age 36) Hamamatsu, Japan
- Turned pro: 2009
- Plays: Left (two-handed backhand)
- Prize money: $78,813

Singles
- Career record: 145–137
- Career titles: 1 ITF
- Highest ranking: No. 562 (25 October 2010)

Doubles
- Career record: 219–125
- Career titles: 2 WTA Challenger, 25 ITF
- Highest ranking: No. 108 (10 October 2016)

Kotomi Takahata (高畑 寿弥, Takahata Kotomi; born 17 November 1989) is a Japanese former professional tennis player.

On 25 October 2010, she reached a career-high singles ranking of 562. She achieved her best doubles ranking of world No. 108 on 10 October 2016.

Takahata made her WTA Tour main-draw debut at the 2011 Japan Women's Open, where she received a wildcard for the doubles tournament with Shuko Aoyama. Aoyama and Takahata lost to the fourth seeds Kimiko Date-Krumm and Zhang Shuai in a tight three-setter.

At the 2014 Japan Women's Open, she also received a wildcard into the main draw with Kyōka Okamura. They defeated Misaki Doi and Elina Svitolina in the first round, but lost to Darija Jurak and Megan Moulton-Levy in the quarterfinals.

At the 2015 Taipei Challenger, she won the doubles title, alongside Kanae Hisami. In the final, they defeated Marina Melnikova and Elise Mertens in straight sets.

== WTA 125 finals ==
=== Doubles: 2 (2 titles) ===
Result	W–L	Date	Tournament	Surface	Partner	Opponents	Score
Win	1–0	Nov 2015	Taipei Open, Taiwan	Carpet (i)	(Japan) Kanae Hisami	(Russia) Marina Melnikova (Belgium) Elise Mertens	6–1, 6–2
Win	2–0	Sep 2016	Dalian Open, China	Hard	(Chinese Taipei) Lee Ya-hsuan	(Thailand) Nicha Lertpitaksinchai (Indonesia) Jessy Rompies	6–2, 6–1

== ITF Circuit finals ==
=== Singles: 1 (title) ===
Legend $10,000 tournaments	Finals by surface Carpet (1–0)

Result	Date	Tournament	Surface	Opponent	Score
Win	Nov 2009	ITF Hyōgo, Japan	Carpet	(Japan) Kazusa Ito	6–2, 6–3

=== Doubles: 36 (25 titles, 11 runner-ups) ===
Legend $60,000 tournaments $25,000 tournaments $15,000 tournaments $10,000 tournaments	Finals by surface Hard (16–9) Clay (1–1) Grass (2–1) Carpet (6–0)

Result	No.	Date	Tournament	Surface	Partner	Opponents	Score
Win	1.	Sep 2009	ITF Kyoto, Japan	Carpet (i)	(Japan) Yuka Higashi	(Japan) Kazusa Ito (Japan) Yuka Mori	3–6, 6–2, [10–6]
Win	2.	Nov 2009	ITF Hyōgo, Japan	Carpet	(Japan) Yoshimi Kawasaki	(Japan) Maya Kato (Japan) Natsumi Yokota	6–2, 6–2
Win	3.	9 May 2010	Fukuoka International, Japan	Grass	(Japan) Misaki Doi	(New Zealand) Marina Erakovic (Russia) Alexandra Panova	6–4, 6–4
Win	4.	2 August 2010	ITF Niigata, Japan	Carpet	(Japan) Akari Inoue	(Japan) Ayumi Oka (Japan) Miki Miyamura	6–1, 6–4
Win	5.	29 August 2010	ITF Saitama, Japan	Hard	(Japan) Akari Inoue	(Japan) Kumiko Iijima (Japan) Akiko Yonemura	6–3, 6–3
Win	6.	20 June 2011	ITF Pattaya, Thailand	Hard	(Japan) Emi Mutaguchi	(China) Zhao Yijing (China) Liang Chen	4–6, 7–5, [10–5]
Win	7.	23 October 2011	ITF Makinohara, Japan	Carpet	(Japan) Shuko Aoyama	(Japan) Junri Namigata (Japan) Akiko Yonemura	6–2, 7–5
Win	8.	12 February 2012	Launceston International, Australia	Hard	(Japan) Shuko Aoyama	(Chinese Taipei) Hsieh Shu-ying (China) Zheng Saisai	6–4, 6–4
Win	9.	23 March 2012	ITF Kōfu, Japan	Hard	(Japan) Ayumi Oka	(Japan) Eri Hozumi (Japan) Remi Tezuka	6–4, 5–7, [10–3]
Win	10.	24 March 2014	ITF Antalya, Turkey	Hard	(Sweden) Susanne Celik	(Czech Republic) Barbora Krejčíková (Turkey) İpek Soylu	6–4, 6–3
Win	11.	13 April 2014	ITF Antalya, Turkey	Hard	(Turkey) Cemre Anıl	(Russia) Yuliya Kalabina (Russia) Mayya Katsitadze	2–6, 7–6^{(5)}, [10–6]
Win	12.	20 April 2014	ITF Antalya, Turkey	Hard	(United States) Tina Tehrani	(China) Zhang Ying (China) Zheng Wushuang	6–1, 6–3
Win	13.	23 June 2014	ITF Bangkok, Thailand	Hard	(Japan) Yumi Miyazaki	(Chinese Taipei) Lee Pei-chi (Thailand) Nungnadda Wannasuk	6–3, 6–1
Win	14.	7 September 2014	ITF Antalya, Turkey	Hard	(Japan) Akiko Omae	(Japan) Yumi Nakano (United Kingdom) Eden Silva	7–5, 6–2
Win	15.	13 September 2014	ITF Antalya, Turkey	Hard	(Japan) Akiko Omae	(Thailand) Varunya Wongteanchai (Thailand) Nungnadda Wannasuk	6–4, 6–2
Win	16.	21 September 2014	ITF Antalya, Turkey	Hard	(Japan) Yumi Nakano	(Lithuania) Agnė Čepelytė (Lithuania) Justina Mikulskytė	6–1, 7–5
Loss	1.	27 February 2015	ITF Clare, Australia	Hard	(Japan) Mana Ayukawa	(Australia) Jessica Moore (United States) Jennifer Elie	3–6, 5–7
Loss	2.	29 March 2015	ITF Nishitama, Japan	Hard	(Japan) Kanae Hisami	(Japan) Kyōka Okamura (Japan) Akiko Yonemura	6–2, 2–6, [5–10]
Win	17.	1 June 2015	ITF Ariake, Japan	Hard	(Japan) Kanae Hisami	(United States) Yuki Kristina Chiang (Japan) Nozomi Fujioka	6–4, 6–4
Win	18.	20 June 2015	ITF Incheon, South Korea	Hard	(Japan) Miyu Kato	(South Korea) Choi Ji-hee (South Korea) Kim Na-ri	4–6, 6–3, [10–7]
Loss	3.	6 July 2015	ITF Bangkok, Thailand	Hard	(Japan) Kanae Hisami	(China) Han Xinyun (China) Zhang Kailin	3–6, 4–6
Loss	4.	18 July 2015	ITF Bangkok, Thailand	Hard	(Japan) Kanae Hisami	(Japan) Akiko Omae (Japan) Erika Sema	6–4, 3–6, [9–11]
Win	19.	17 October 2015	ITF Makinohara, Japan	Grass	(Japan) Kanae Hisami	(Japan) Yukina Saigo (United States) Ena Shibahara	6–4, 6–1
Loss	5.	24 October 2015	ITF Hamamatsu, Japan	Grass	(Japan) Kanae Hisami	(Japan) Mana Ayukawa (Japan) Makoto Ninomiya	6–0, 3–6, [4–10]
Loss	6.	2 April 2016	ITF Kōfu, Japan	Hard	(Japan) Kanae Hisami	(Japan) Shuko Aoyama (Japan) Erina Hayashi	5–7, 5–7
Win	20.	12 June 2016	ITF Tokyo, Japan	Hard	(Japan) Kanae Hisami	(Australia) Lizette Cabrera (Japan) Miharu Imanishi	6–1, 6–4
Loss	7.	10 July 2016	Reinert Open, Germany	Clay	(Japan) Kanae Hisami	(Russia) Natela Dzalamidze (Ukraine) Valeriya Strakhova	2–6, 1–6
Win	21.	2 October 2016	ITF Iizuka, Japan	Hard	(Japan) Kanae Hisami	(Japan) Miharu Imanishi (Japan) Akiko Omae	6–2, 3–6, [10–4]
Win	22.	25 March 2017	ITF Nishitama, Japan	Hard	(Japan) Momoko Kobori	(Japan) Shiho Akita (Japan) Erika Sema	6–1, 6–2
Win	23.	13 May 2017	Fukuoka International, Japan	Carpet	(Japan) Junri Namigata	(Japan) Erina Hayashi (Japan) Robu Kajitani	6–0, 6–7^{(3)}, [10–7]
Loss	8.	10 June 2017	ITF Tokyo, Japan	Hard	(Japan) Momoko Kobori	(Japan) Rika Fujiwara (Japan) Kyōka Okamura	2–6, 0–6
Win	24.	16 June 2017	Hódmezővásárhely Open, Hungary	Clay	(India) Prarthana Thombare	(Norway) Ulrikke Eikeri (Croatia) Tereza Mrdeža	1–0 ret.
Loss	9.	23 June 2017	İzmir Cup, Turkey	Hard	(Finland) Emma Laine	(Belgium) An-Sophie Mestach (Serbia) Nina Stojanović	4–6, 5–7
Win	25.	14 October 2017	ITF Makinohara, Japan	Carpet	(Japan) Miyabi Inoue	(Japan) Yukina Saigo (Japan) Ayano Shimizu	6–3, 7–5
Loss	10.	17 June 2018	ITF Kōfu, Japan	Hard	(Japan) Megumi Nishimoto	(Japan) Misaki Doi (Japan) Misa Eguchi	3–6, 7–6^{(2)}, [8–10]
Loss	11.	28 July 2018	ITF Taipei, Taiwan	Hard	(Chinese Taipei) Chan Chin-wei	(Chinese Taipei) Joanna Garland (Chinese Taipei) Lee Hua-chen	1–6, 6–3, [1–10]
