= 2012 WTA 125K series =

Details
- Duration: October 29, 2012 – November 11, 2012
- Edition: 1st
- Tournaments: 2

Achievements (singles)
- Most titles: (France) Kristina Mladenovic (2)
- Prize money leader: (France) Kristina Mladenovic ($22,750)

The WTA 125K series is the secondary professional tennis circuit organised by the Women's Tennis Association. The 2012 WTA 125K series calendar consisted of two tournaments, each with a total prize money fund of $125,000.

== Schedule ==
Week of	Tournament	Champions	Runners-up	Semifinalists	Quarterfinalists
October 29	OEC Taipei Ladies Open; Taipei, Taiwan $125,000 – carpet (indoor) – 32S/16Q/16D; Singles – Doubles	(France) Kristina Mladenovic; 6–4, 6–3	(Chinese Taipei) Chang Kai-chen	(Japan) Kurumi Nara (Japan) Misaki Doi	(Kazakhstan) Zarina Diyas (Japan) Kimiko Date-Krumm (Japan) Ayumi Morita (Belarus) Olga Govortsova
October 29	OEC Taipei Ladies Open; Taipei, Taiwan $125,000 – carpet (indoor) – 32S/16Q/16D; Singles – Doubles	(Chinese Taipei) Chan Hao-ching (France) Kristina Mladenovic; 5–7, 6–2, [10–8]	(Chinese Taipei) Chang Kai-chen (Belarus) Olga Govortsova	(Japan) Kurumi Nara (Japan) Misaki Doi	(Kazakhstan) Zarina Diyas (Japan) Kimiko Date-Krumm (Japan) Ayumi Morita (Belarus) Olga Govortsova
November 5	Royal Indian Open; Pune, India $125,000 – hard – 32S/16Q/16D; Singles – Doubles	(Ukraine) Elina Svitolina; 6–2, 6–3	(Japan) Kimiko Date-Krumm	(Germany) Andrea Petkovic (Thailand) Tamarine Tanasugarn	(Russia) Nina Bratchikova (Thailand) Luksika Kumkhum (Croatia) Donna Vekić (Japan) Misaki Doi
November 5	Royal Indian Open; Pune, India $125,000 – hard – 32S/16Q/16D; Singles – Doubles	(Russia) Nina Bratchikova (Georgia (country)) Oksana Kalashnikova; 6–0, 4–6, [10–8]	(Israel) Julia Glushko (Thailand) Noppawan Lertcheewakarn	(Germany) Andrea Petkovic (Thailand) Tamarine Tanasugarn	(Russia) Nina Bratchikova (Thailand) Luksika Kumkhum (Croatia) Donna Vekić (Japan) Misaki Doi

== Points distribution ==
Points are awarded as follows:

Tournament category	W	F	SF	QF	R16	R32	Q
Challenger $125,000	160	117	85	44	22	1	

== Statistical information ==
These tables present the number of singles (S) and doubles (D) titles won by each player and each nation during the season, within all the tournament categories of the 2012 WTA 125s. The players/nations are sorted by: 1) total number of titles (a doubles title won by two players representing the same nation counts as only one win for the nation); 2) a singles > doubles hierarchy; 3) alphabetical order (by family names for players).

=== Titles won by player ===
Total	Player	S	D	S	D
2	Kristina Mladenovic (FRA)	●	●	1	1
1	Elina Svitolina (UKR)	●		1	0
1	Nina Bratchikova (RUS)		●	0	1
1	Chan Hao-ching (TPE)		●	0	1
1	Oksana Kalashnikova (GEO)		●	0	1

=== Titles won by nation ===
Total	Nation	S	D
2	France (FRA)	1	1
1	Ukraine (UKR)	1	0
1	Chinese Taipei (TPE)	0	1
1	Georgia (GEO)	0	1
1	Russia (RUS)	0	1
