= 2012 Royal Indian Open – Singles =

Singles
- 2012 Royal Indian Open

Final
- Champion: (Ukraine) Elina Svitolina
- Runner-up: (Japan) Kimiko Date-Krumm
- Score: 6–2, 6–3

Events
Singles	Doubles
← 2008 ·	Royal Indian Open	· 2017 →

This was a new event in 2012. Elina Svitolina won the first title, defeating Kimiko Date-Krumm 6–2, 6–3 in the final.

== Seeds ==
1. (Russia) Nina Bratchikova (quarterfinals)
2. (Japan) Misaki Doi (quarterfinals)
3. (Croatia) Donna Vekić (quarterfinals)
4. (Czech Republic) Eva Birnerová (second round)
5. (Japan) Kimiko Date-Krumm (final)
6. (Germany) Andrea Petkovic (semifinals)
7. (Ukraine) Elina Svitolina (champion)
8. (Thailand) Tamarine Tanasugarn (semifinals)

== Main draw ==
=== Key ===
- Q = Qualifier
- WC = Wild card
- LL = Lucky loser
- Alt = Alternate
- SE = Special exempt
- PR = Protected ranking
- ITF = ITF entry
- JE = Junior exempt
- w/o = Walkover
- r = Retired
- d = Defaulted
- SR = Special ranking

=== Finals ===
Semifinals
6/WC	(Germany) Andrea Petkovic	2	5
7	(Ukraine) Elina Svitolina	6	7
8	(Thailand) Tamarine Tanasugarn	4	7	4
5	(Japan) Kimiko Date-Krumm	6	5	6

Final
7	(Ukraine) Elina Svitolina	6	6
5	(Japan) Kimiko Date-Krumm	2	3

=== Top half ===
First round
1	(Russia) N Bratchikova	6	6
(Thailand) N Luangnam	4	3
(Ukraine) O Savchuk	6	6
(Japan) K Nara	2	2
WC	(India) P Thombare	6	2	4
(China) C Liu	3	6	6
(Georgia (country)) S Shapatava	6^{4}	5
6/WC	(Germany) A Petkovic	7^{7}	7
4	(Czech Republic) E Birnerová	6	7
Q	(Australia) S Bengson	2	5
(Thailand) L Kumkhum	6	6
(Hong Kong) W-y Chan	4	4
(South Korea) S-r Lee	6	6^{4}	4
WC	(India) R Bhosale	3	7^{7}	6
Q	(Slovenia) A Klepač	3	2
7	(Ukraine) E Svitolina	6	6

Second round
1	(Russia) N Bratchikova	6	6
(Ukraine) O Savchuk	1	1
(China) C Liu	1	0
6/WC	(Germany) A Petkovic	6	6
4	(Czech Republic) E Birnerová	6	3	1
(Thailand) L Kumkhum	3	6	6
WC	(India) R Bhosale	3	0
7	(Ukraine) E Svitolina	6	6

Quarterfinals
1	(Russia) N Bratchikova	2	0
6/WC	(Germany) A Petkovic	6	6
(Thailand) L Kumkhum	7^{7}	1^{r}
7	(Ukraine) E Svitolina	6^{3}	4

Semifinals
6/WC	(Germany) A Petkovic	2	5
7	(Ukraine) E Svitolina	6	7

=== Bottom half ===
First round
8	(Thailand) T Tanasugarn	6	6^{3}	6
(Chinese Taipei) C-w Chan	2	7^{7}	1
(Turkey) Ç Büyükakçay	6	6
Q	(India) N Chilumula	2	1
PR	(Georgia (country)) O Kalashnikova	7	6
(Australia) M Adamczak	5	3
(Thailand) Vara Wongteanchai	0	1
3	(Croatia) D Vekić	6	6
5	(Japan) K Date-Krumm	6	6
Q	(India) R Sunkara	0	3
(China) Y Xu	0	1
(China) Y Zhou	6	6
(Israel) J Glushko	3	5
(Thailand) N Lertcheewakarn	6	7
WC	(India) P Bhambri	0	2
2	(Japan) M Doi	6	6

Second round
8	(Thailand) T Tanasugarn	4	6	6
(Turkey) Ç Büyükakçay	6	3	3
PR	(Georgia (country)) O Kalashnikova	2	6	0
3	(Croatia) D Vekić	6	4	6
5	(Japan) K Date-Krumm	6	4	6
(China) Y Zhou	4	6	2
(Thailand) N Lertcheewakarn	0	1
2	(Japan) M Doi	6	6

Quarterfinals
8	(Thailand) T Tanasugarn	6	6
3	(Croatia) D Vekić	2	4
5	(Japan) K Date-Krumm	6	6
2	(Japan) M Doi	1	4

Semifinals
8	(Thailand) T Tanasugarn	4	7	4
5	(Japan) K Date-Krumm	6	5	6
