= 2012 Royal Indian Open =

- Date: 5 November – 11 November
- Surface: Deco Turf (Hard)
- Location: Pune, India

Champions

Singles
- (Ukraine) Elina Svitolina

Doubles
- (Russia) Nina Bratchikova / (Georgia (country)) Oksana Kalashnikova
- Royal Indian Open

The 2012 Royal Indian Open was a tournament organized for female professional tennis players, played on outdoor hard courts. The event is classified as a WTA Challenger Series tournament. It took place in Pune, India between 5 and 11 November 2012.

== WTA entrants ==
=== Seeds ===
Country	Player	Rank^{1}	Seed
RUS	Nina Bratchikova	90	1
JPN	Misaki Doi	104	2
CRO	Donna Vekić	114	3
CZE	Eva Birnerová	125	4
JPN	Kimiko Date-Krumm	128	5
GER	Andrea Petkovic	140	6
UKR	Elina Svitolina	148	7
THA	Tamarine Tanasugarn	151	8

- ^{1} Rankings are as of 29 October 2012.

=== Other entrants ===
The following players received wildcards into the singles main draw:

- (India) Prerna Bhambri
- (India) Rutuja Bhosale
- (Germany) Andrea Petkovic
- (India) Prarthana Thombare

The following players received entry from the qualifying draw:

- (Australia) Stephanie Bengson
- (India) Nidhi Chilumula
- (Slovenia) Andreja Klepač
- (India) Rishika Sunkara

== Champions ==
=== Singles ===
- (Ukraine) Elina Svitolina def. (Japan) Kimiko Date-Krumm, 6–2, 6–3

=== Doubles ===
- (Russia) Nina Bratchikova / (Georgia (country)) Oksana Kalashnikova def. (Israel) Julia Glushko / (Thailand) Noppawan Lertcheewakarn, 6–0, 4–6, [10–8]
