= 2009 NECC–ITF Women's Tennis Championships =

- Date: 16–22 November
- Edition: 1st
- Category: ITF Women's Circuit
- Prize money: $50,000
- Surface: Hard / Outdoor
- Location: Pune; India

Champions

Singles
- (Japan) Rika Fujiwara

Doubles
- (Italy) Nicole Clerico / (Ukraine) Anastasiya Vasylyeva
- NECC–ITF Women's Tennis Championships

The 2009 ITF Pune Open (known as the NECC–ITF Women's Tennis Championships for sponsorship reasons) was a professional tennis tournament played on outdoor hard courts.

The 2009 ITF Women's Circuit offered a total of $50,000 in prize money. It took place in Pune, India from 16 to 22 November 2009. To celebrate 10 years of the tournament which started in 2001, the prize money was increased to US dollars 50,000 in 2009. It started with USD 5000 in 2001.

== Results ==
=== Singles ===
- (Japan) Rika Fujiwara def. (Serbia) Bojana Jovanovski, 5–7, 6–4, 6–3

=== Doubles ===
- (Italy) Nicole Clerico / (Ukraine) Anastasiya Vasylyeva def. (Russia) Nina Bratchikova / (Kyrgyzstan) Ksenia Palkina, 4–6, 6–3, [13–11]
