= Royal Indian Open =

Defunct tennis tournament
- Location: Pune; India
- Venue: Shree Shiv Chhatrapati Sports Complex
- Category: Challenger
- Surface: Deco Turf (Hard)
- Draw: 32M/16Q/16D
- Prize money: US$125,000
- Website: royalindianopen.com

The Royal Indian Open is a tournament organized for female professional tennis players, played on outdoor hard courts. The event is classified as a WTA Challenger Series tournament. It made its debut in 2012, in Pune, India. It is played at the Shree Shiv Chhatrapati Sports Complex.

The Challenger tournament has since been relocated to Mumbai.

== History ==
Pune is the fourth town in the history of India to host a WTA event, after Kolkata (2005–2007), Hyderabad (2003–2005) and Bangalore (2006–2008).

India's renewed participation through this Challenger event was originally supposed to be held in Delhi, but on 17 October 2012, just a few weeks before the tournament's first edition, it was announced the event had been shifted to Pune to be held at the Shree Shiv Chhatrapati Sports Complex..

In 2012, it became the second event (after the OEC Taipei Ladies Open) to be part of the WTA 125s.

In 2012, the tournament was featured as a WTA Challenger event, and named the Royal Indian Open. Pune is the fourth city in the history of India to host a WTA event, after Bangalore, Hyderabad, and Kolkata (Sunfeast Open). Later, Mumbai became the fifth city to do the same.

== Past finals ==
=== Singles ===
Year	Champion	Runner-up	Score
2012	(Ukraine) Elina Svitolina	(Japan) Kimiko Date-Krumm	6–2, 6–3
↑ WTA 125K series ↑
2010–11	Not held		
2009	(Japan) Rika Fujiwara	(Serbia) Bojana Jovanovski	5–7, 6–4, 6–3
↑ ITF 50K event ↑

=== Doubles ===
Year	Champions	Runners-up	Score
2012	(Russia) Nina Bratchikova (Georgia (country)) Oksana Kalashnikova	(Israel) Julia Glushko (Thailand) Noppawan Lertcheewakarn	6–0, 4–6, [10–8]
↑ WTA 125K series ↑
2010–11	Not held		
2009	(Italy) Nicole Clerico (Ukraine) Anastasiya Vasylyeva	(Russia) Nina Bratchikova (Kyrgyzstan) Ksenia Palkina	4–6, 6–3, [13–11]
↑ ITF 50K event ↑

== See also ==
- WTA Indian Open
- Mumbai Open
