= 2012 OEC Taipei WTA Ladies Open – Doubles =

Doubles
- 2012 OEC Taipei WTA Ladies Open

Final
- Champions: (Chinese Taipei) Chan Hao-ching (France) Kristina Mladenovic
- Runners-up: (Chinese Taipei) Chang Kai-chen (Belarus) Olga Govortsova
- Score: 5–7, 6–2, [10–8]

Events
Singles	Doubles
- OEC Taipei WTA Ladies Open

Chan Yung-jan and Zheng Jie were the defending champions, but both decided not to participate.
Chan Hao-ching and Kristina Mladenovic defeated Chang Kai-chen and Olga Govortsova 5–7, 6–2, [10–8] in the final.

== Seeds ==
1. (Chinese Taipei) Chan Hao-ching / (France) Kristina Mladenovic (champions)
2. (Chinese Taipei) Chang Kai-chen / (Belarus) Olga Govortsova (final)
3. (Chinese Taipei) Chan Chin-wei / (Japan) Kimiko Date-Krumm (semifinals)
4. (Israel) Julia Glushko / (China) Zheng Saisai (quarterfinals)

== Draw ==
Key

- Q = Qualifier
- WC = Wild card
- LL = Lucky loser
- Alt = Alternate
- ITF = ITF entry
- PR = Protected ranking
- SR = Special ranking
- SE = Special exempt
- JE = Junior exempt
- JR = Junior Accelerator Programme entrant
- CO = College Accelerator Programme entrant
- NG = Next Gen Accelerator Program entrant
- w/o = Walkover
- r = Retired
- d = Defaulted

=== Draw ===
First round
1	(Chinese Taipei) H-c Chan (France) K Mladenovic	6	6
(Japan) M Doi (Hong Kong) L Zhang	2	0
(Thailand) L Kumkhum (Thailand) V Wongteanchai	6	6
WC	(Chinese Taipei) P-c Lee (Chinese Taipei) C-h Yang	4	2
4	(Israel) J Glushko (China) S Zheng	6	6
(Poland) P Kania (Poland) K Kawa	4	3
(Chinese Taipei) S-y Kao (Chinese Taipei) H-c Lee	7	6
WC	(Chinese Taipei) Y Chen (Japan) K Nara	5	2
(Chinese Taipei) S-y Hsieh (Thailand) N Lertcheewakarn	4	6	[4]
WC	(Chinese Taipei) C-w Hsu (Chinese Taipei) Y-h Lee	6	1	[10]
WC	(Chinese Taipei) T-f Juan (China) Z Yang	1	1
3	(Chinese Taipei) C-w Chan (Japan) K Date-Krumm	6	6
(France) C Garcia (Russia) I Khromacheva	6	6
Alt	(Kazakhstan) Z Diyas (Japan) S Ohta	2	1
(Australia) M Adamczak (Australia) S Bengson	2	5
2	(Chinese Taipei) K-c Chang (Belarus) O Govortsova	6	7

Quarterfinals
1	(Chinese Taipei) H-c Chan (France) K Mladenovic	6	6
(Thailand) L Kumkhum (Thailand) V Wongteanchai	3	4
4	(Israel) J Glushko (China) S Zheng	6^{2}	6	[9]
(Chinese Taipei) S-y Kao (Chinese Taipei) H-c Lee	7^{7}	2	[11]
WC	(Chinese Taipei) C-w Hsu (Chinese Taipei) Y-h Lee	3	2
3	(Chinese Taipei) C-w Chan (Japan) K Date-Krumm	6	6
(France) C Garcia (Russia) I Khromacheva	7^{7}	3	[5]
2	(Chinese Taipei) K-c Chang (Belarus) O Govortsova	6^{5}	6	[10]

Semifinals
1	(Chinese Taipei) H-c Chan (France) K Mladenovic	6	7
(Chinese Taipei) S-y Kao (Chinese Taipei) H-c Lee	1	5
3	(Chinese Taipei) C-w Chan (Japan) K Date-Krumm	4	3
2	(Chinese Taipei) K-c Chang (Belarus) O Govortsova	6	6

Final
1	(Chinese Taipei) H-c Chan (France) K Mladenovic	5	6	[10]
2	(Chinese Taipei) K-c Chang (Belarus) O Govortsova	7	2	[8]
