= 2009 NECC–ITF Women's Tennis Championships – Singles =

ITF Women's Tennis Championships – Singles
- 2009 NECC–ITF Women's Tennis Championships

Final
- Champion: (Japan) Rika Fujiwara
- Runner-up: (Serbia) Bojana Jovanovski
- Score: 5–7, 6–4, 6–3

Events
Singles	Doubles
← 2008 ·	NECC–ITF Women's Tennis Championships	· 2010 →

This was the first edition of the tournament. Tamarine Tanasugarn was the top seed, but she lost in the quarterfinals.

Rika Fujiwara won the title, defeating Bojana Jovanovski in the final, 5–7, 6–4, 6–3.

== Seeds ==
1. (Thailand) Tamarine Tanasugarn (quarterfinals)
2. (Slovenia) Maša Zec Peškirič (second round)
3. (Serbia) Bojana Jovanovski (final)
4. (Kyrgyzstan) Ksenia Palkina (first round)
5. (Russia) Nina Bratchikova (semifinals)
6. (Japan) Rika Fujiwara (champion)
7. N/A
8. (Ukraine) Anastasiya Vasylyeva (quarterfinals)

== Main draw ==
=== Key ===
- Q = Qualifier
- WC = Wild card
- LL = Lucky loser
- Alt = Alternate
- SE = Special exempt
- PR = Protected ranking
- ITF = ITF entry
- JE = Junior exempt
- w/o = Walkover
- r = Retired
- d = Defaulted
- SR = Special ranking

=== Finals ===
Semifinals
5	(Russia) Nina Bratchikova	2	2
6	(Japan) Rika Fujiwara	6	6
3	(Serbia) Bojana Jovanovski	6	6
WC	(Uzbekistan) Sabina Sharipova	4	1

Final
6	(Japan) Rika Fujiwara	5	6	6
3	(Serbia) Bojana Jovanovski	7	4	3

=== Top half ===
First round
1	(Thailand) T Tanasugarn	6	6
(India) R Chakravarthi	2	0
WC	(India) N Sanjeev	7^{7}	6
Q	(Serbia) T Čurović	6^{5}	3
(Ukraine) G Piven	6^{3}	3
(Thailand) N Lertcheewakarn	7^{7}	6
WC	(India) P Bhambri	4	3
5	(Russia) N Bratchikova	6	6
4	(Kyrgyzstan) K Palkina	7	1	0^{r}
(Thailand) N Luangnam	5	6	5
LL	(India) K-S Solanki	2	3
(Thailand) V Wongteanchai	6	6
(Japan) S Hisamatsu	6	2	7
(Israel) K Shlomo	2	6	5
(Japan) M Miyamura	2	1
6	(Japan) R Fujiwara	6	6

Second round
1	(Thailand) T Tanasugarn	6	6
WC	(India) N Sanjeev	2	3
(Thailand) N Lertcheewakarn	6^{6}	2
5	(Russia) N Bratchikova	7^{8}	6
(Thailand) N Luangnam	6^{3}	6^{5}
(Thailand) V Wongteanchai	7^{7}	7^{7}
(Japan) S Hisamatsu	2	0
6	(Japan) R Fujiwara	6	6

Quarterfinals
1	(Thailand) T Tanasugarn	3	2
5	(Russia) N Bratchikova	6	6
(Thailand) V Wongteanchai	1	1
6	(Japan) R Fujiwara	6	6

Semifinals
5	(Russia) N Bratchikova	2	2
6	(Japan) R Fujiwara	6	6

=== Bottom half ===
First round
8	(Ukraine) A Vasylyeva	6	6
(Italy) N Clerico	3	2
(Japan) A Malhotra	0	4
(India) S Bhambri	6	6
WC	(India) R Teltumbde	2	3
(India) P Venkatesha	6	6
Q	(India) R Sunkara	4	5
3	(Serbia) B Jovanovski	6	7
LL	(India) S Goutham	7^{7}	2	6
Q	(India) S Burman	6^{2}	6	4
Q	(Israel) C Astrogo	6	4	6
(Slovenia) D Jakupović	2	6	1
WC	(Uzbekistan) S Sharipova	6	6
(Portugal) M de Lattre	4	3
(South Korea) H-s Kim	3	4
2	(Slovenia) M Zec Peškirič	6	6

Second round
8	(Ukraine) A Vasylyeva	6	5	7
(India) S Bhambri	1	7	5
(India) P Venkatesha	1	0
3	(Serbia) B Jovanovski	6	6
LL	(India) S Goutham	3	6	3
Q	(Israel) C Astrogo	6	4	6
WC	(Uzbekistan) S Sharipova	6	6
2	(Slovenia) M Zec Peškirič	3	2

Quarterfinals
8	(Ukraine) A Vasylyeva	7	0	4
3	(Serbia) B Jovanovski	5	6	6
Q	(Israel) C Astrogo	2	3
WC	(Uzbekistan) S Sharipova	6	6

Semifinals
3	(Serbia) B Jovanovski	6	6
WC	(Uzbekistan) S Sharipova	4	1
