= 2012 OEC Taipei WTA Ladies Open – Singles =

Singles
- 2012 OEC Taipei WTA Ladies Open

Final
- Champion: (France) Kristina Mladenovic
- Runner-up: (Chinese Taipei) Chang Kai-chen
- Score: 6–4, 6–3

Events
Singles	Doubles
- OEC Taipei WTA Ladies Open

Ayumi Morita was the defending champion, but withdrew in the quarterfinals because of a right knee injury.
Kristina Mladenovic won the title, defeating Chang Kai-chen 6–4, 6–3 in the final.

== Seeds ==
1. (China) Peng Shuai (first round)
2. (Belarus) Olga Govortsova (quarterfinals)
3. (Japan) Ayumi Morita (quarterfinals, withdrew because of a right knee injury)
4. (France) Kristina Mladenovic (champion)
5. (Chinese Taipei) Chang Kai-chen (final)
6. (Japan) Kimiko Date-Krumm (quarterfinals)
7. (Japan) Misaki Doi (semifinals)
8. (Hungary) Gréta Arn (first round)

== Draw ==
Key

- Q = Qualifier
- WC = Wild card
- LL = Lucky loser
- Alt = Alternate
- ITF = ITF entry
- PR = Protected ranking
- SR = Special ranking
- SE = Special exempt
- JE = Junior exempt
- JR = Junior Accelerator Programme entrant
- CO = College Accelerator Programme entrant
- NG = Next Gen Accelerator Program entrant
- w/o = Walkover
- r = Retired
- d = Defaulted

=== Finals ===
Semifinals
(Japan) Kurumi Nara	3	6	5
4	(France) Kristina Mladenovic	6	3	7
7	(Japan) Misaki Doi	7^{7}	3	1
5	(Chinese Taipei) Chang Kai-chen	6^{3}	6	6

Final
4	(France) Kristina Mladenovic	6	6
5	(Chinese Taipei) Chang Kai-chen	4	3

=== Top half ===
First round
1/WC	(China) S Peng	2	2
(Kazakhstan) Z Diyas	6	6
LL	(Thailand) V Wongteanchai	7^{7}	6
(Thailand) N Lertcheewakarn	6^{3}	2
WC	(Chinese Taipei) Y-h Lee	3	3
(Japan) K Nara	6	6
(Thailand) T Tanasugarn	6	4	7
8	(Hungary) G Arn	1	6	5
4	(France) K Mladenovic	6	4	6
(Israel) J Glushko	2	6	3
(Thailand) N Luangnam	6	7^{10}
(Japan) E Sema	4	6^{8}
WC	(Chinese Taipei) T-f Juan	1	3
Q	(Hong Kong) L Zhang	6	6
Q	(United States) A Stevenson	4	6	6^{5}
6	(Japan) K Date-Krumm	6	3	7^{7}

Second round
(Kazakhstan) Z Diyas	6	6
LL	(Thailand) V Wongteanchai	1	0
(Japan) K Nara	6	0	6
(Thailand) T Tanasugarn	3	6	4
4	(France) K Mladenovic	6	6^{6}	6
(Thailand) N Luangnam	1	7^{8}	2
Q	(Hong Kong) L Zhang	1	2
6	(Japan) K Date-Krumm	6	6

Quarterfinals
(Kazakhstan) Z Diyas	3	4
(Japan) K Nara	6	6
4	(France) K Mladenovic	6	6
6	(Japan) K Date-Krumm	3	0

Semifinals
(Japan) K Nara	3	6	5
4	(France) K Mladenovic	6	3	7

=== Bottom half ===
First round
7	(Japan) M Doi	6	7
(China) Q Wang	4	5
Q	(Chinese Taipei) W-h Hsu	5	7^{7}	6
WC	(Chinese Taipei) H-c Chan	7	6^{2}	4
WC	(Chinese Taipei) C-w Chan	4	3
(Poland) P Kania	6	6
Q	(Chinese Taipei) H-c Lee	2	1
3	(Japan) A Morita	6	6
5	(Chinese Taipei) K-c Chang	7^{7}	5	6
(Thailand) L Kumkhum	6^{5}	7	2
(Australia) M Adamczak	3	2
(France) C Garcia	6	6
(Russia) I Khromacheva	7^{8}	6
(United States) A Glatch	6^{6}	3
(China) S Zheng	6^{3}	1
2	(Belarus) O Govortsova	7^{7}	6

Second round
7	(Japan) M Doi	6	6
Q	(Chinese Taipei) W-h Hsu	2	3
(Poland) P Kania	2	2
3	(Japan) A Morita	6	6
5	(Chinese Taipei) K-c Chang	7^{7}	6
(France) C Garcia	6^{5}	3
(Russia) I Khromacheva	4	2
2	(Belarus) O Govortsova	6	6

Quarterfinals
7	(Japan) M Doi	w/o
3	(Japan) A Morita
5	(Chinese Taipei) K-c Chang	6	6
2	(Belarus) O Govortsova	0	2

Semifinals
7	(Japan) M Doi	7^{7}	3	1
5	(Chinese Taipei) K-c Chang	6^{3}	6	6
