= 2012 OEC Taipei WTA Ladies Open =

- Date: 29 October – 4 November
- Edition: 5th
- Surface: Carpet / Indoors
- Location: Taipei, Taiwan

Champions

Singles
- (France) Kristina Mladenovic

Doubles
- (Chinese Taipei) Chan Hao-ching / (France) Kristina Mladenovic
- Taipei Open

The 2012 OEC Taipei WTA Ladies Open was a professional tennis tournament played on indoor carpet courts. It was the fifth edition of the tournament and the first event in the new 2012 WTA 125s. It took place in Taipei, Taiwan between 29 October and 4 November 2012.

== WTA entrants ==
=== Seeds ===
| Country | Player | Rank^{1} | Seed |
|---|---|---|---|
| CHN | Peng Shuai | 40 | 1 |
| BLR | Olga Govortsova | 54 | 2 |
| JPN | Ayumi Morita | 74 | 3 |
| FRA | Kristina Mladenovic | 93 | 4 |
| TPE | Chang Kai-chen | 97 | 5 |
| JPN | Kimiko Date-Krumm | 100 | 6 |
| JPN | Misaki Doi | 104 | 7 |
| HUN | Gréta Arn | 118 | 8 |

- ^{1} Rankings are as of October 22, 2012.

=== Other entrants ===
The following players received wildcards into the singles main draw:

- (Chinese Taipei) Chan Chin-wei
- (Chinese Taipei) Chan Hao-ching
- (Chinese Taipei) Juan Ting-fei
- (Chinese Taipei) Lee Ya-hsuan
- (China) Peng Shuai

The following players received entry from the qualifying draw:

- (Chinese Taipei) Hsu Wen-hsin
- (Chinese Taipei) Lee Hua-chen
- (United States) Alexandra Stevenson
- (Hong Kong) Zhang Ling

== Champions ==
=== Singles ===
- (France) Kristina Mladenovic def. (Chinese Taipei) Chang Kai-chen, 6–4, 6–3

=== Doubles ===
- (Chinese Taipei) Chan Hao-ching / (France) Kristina Mladenovic def. (Chinese Taipei) Chang Kai-chen / (Belarus) Olga Govortsova, 5–7, 6–2, [10–8]
