= 2009 NECC–ITF Women's Tennis Championships – Doubles =

ITF Women's Tennis Championships – Doubles
- 2009 NECC–ITF Women's Tennis Championships

Final
- Champion: (Italy) Nicole Clerico (Ukraine) Anastasiya Vasylyeva
- Runner-up: (Russia) Nina Bratchikova (Kyrgyzstan) Ksenia Palkina
- Score: 4–6, 6–3, [13–11]

Events
Singles	Doubles
- NECC–ITF Women's Tennis Championships

This was the tournament's first edition.
Second seeds Nicole Clerico and Anastasiya Vasylyeva won the title, defeating top seeds Nina Bratchikova and Ksenia Palkina in the final, 4–6, 6–3, [13–11].

== Seeds ==
1. (Russia) Nina Bratchikova / (Kyrgyzstan) Ksenia Palkina (final)
2. (Italy) Nicole Clerico / (Ukraine) Anastasiya Vasylyeva (champions)
3. (Japan) Shiho Hisamatsu / (Japan) Miki Miyamura (first round)
4. (Israel) Keren Shlomo / (India) Poojashree Venkatesha (quarterfinals)

== Draw ==
Key

- Q = Qualifier
- WC = Wild card
- LL = Lucky loser
- Alt = Alternate
- ITF = ITF entry
- PR = Protected ranking
- SR = Special ranking
- SE = Special exempt
- JE = Junior exempt
- JR = Junior Accelerator Programme entrant
- CO = College Accelerator Programme entrant
- NG = Next Gen Accelerator Program entrant
- w/o = Walkover
- r = Retired
- d = Defaulted

=== Draw ===
First round
1	(Russia) N Bratchikova (Kyrgyzstan) K Palkina	6	6
(South Korea) H-s Kim (Ukraine) G Piven	3	4
WC	(India) A Agrawal (India) S Rana	2	6	[5]
Q	(India) P Bhambri (Uzbekistan) S Sharipova	6	2	[10]
3	(Japan) S Hisamatsu (Japan) M Miyamura	0	1
(Israel) C Astrogo (Serbia) B Jovanovski	6	6
(Thailand) N Lertcheewakarn (Thailand) V Wongteanchai	7^{7}	6
Q	(Serbia) T Čurović (Slovenia) D Jakupović	6^{1}	2
(India) S Bhambri (India) R Chakravarthi	6	4	[10]
WC	(India) N Sanjeev (India) R Tulpule	4	6	[7]
WC	(India) A Shrivastava (India) R Teltumbde	2	4
4	(Israel) K Shlomo (India) P Venkatesha	6	6
(India) T Bhattacharyya (India) S Burman	5	4
(India) K-S Solanki (India) R Sunkara	7	6
(Portugal) M de Lattre (Japan) A Malhotra	0	3
2	(Italy) N Clerico (Ukraine) A Vasylyeva	6	6

Quarterfinals
1	(Russia) N Bratchikova (Kyrgyzstan) K Palkina	6	6
Q	(India) P Bhambri (Uzbekistan) S Sharipova	1	2
(Israel) C Astrogo (Serbia) B Jovanovski	2	6	[9]
(Thailand) N Lertcheewakarn (Thailand) V Wongteanchai	6	3	[11]
(India) S Bhambri (India) R Chakravarthi	6	2	[10]
4	(Israel) K Shlomo (India) P Venkatesha	3	6	[7]
(India) K-S Solanki (India) R Sunkara	2	3
2	(Italy) N Clerico (Ukraine) A Vasylyeva	6	6

Semifinals
1	(Russia) N Bratchikova (Kyrgyzstan) K Palkina	7	6
(Thailand) N Lertcheewakarn (Thailand) V Wongteanchai	5	3
(India) S Bhambri (India) R Chakravarthi	3	6	[6]
2	(Italy) N Clerico (Ukraine) A Vasylyeva	6	1	[10]

Final
1	(Russia) N Bratchikova (Kyrgyzstan) K Palkina	6	3	[11]
2	(Italy) N Clerico (Ukraine) A Vasylyeva	4	6	[13]
