= 2012 Royal Indian Open – Doubles =

Doubles
- 2012 Royal Indian Open

Final
- Champions: (Russia) Nina Bratchikova (Georgia (country)) Oksana Kalashnikova
- Runners-up: (Israel) Julia Glushko (Thailand) Noppawan Lertcheewakarn
- Score: 6–0, 4–6, [10–8]

Events
Singles	Doubles
← 2008 ·	Royal Indian Open	· 2017 →

This was a new event in 2012.

Nina Bratchikova and Oksana Kalashnikova won the title, defeating Julia Glushko and Noppawan Lertcheewakarn 6–0, 4–6, [10–8] in the final.

== Seeds ==
1. (Czech Republic) Eva Birnerová / (Slovenia) Andreja Klepač (semifinals)
2. (Russia) Nina Bratchikova / (Georgia (country)) Oksana Kalashnikova (champions)
3. (Australia) Monique Adamczak / (Australia) Stephanie Bengson (second round)
4. (Israel) Julia Glushko / (Thailand) Noppawan Lertcheewakarn (final)

== Draw ==
=== Key ===
- Q = Qualifier
- WC = Wild card
- LL = Lucky loser
- Alt = Alternate
- SE = Special exempt
- PR = Protected ranking
- ITF = ITF entry
- JE = Junior exempt
- w/o = Walkover
- r = Retired
- d = Defaulted
- SR = Special ranking

=== Draw ===
First round
1	(Czech Republic) E Birnerová (Slovenia) A Klepač	3	6	[10]
(Chinese Taipei) C-w Chan (China) C Liu	6	4	[3]
(Japan) K Date-Krumm (Japan) K Nara	6	6
WC	(India) A Bhargava (Georgia (country)) S Shapatava	2	1
4	(Israel) J Glushko (Thailand) N Lertcheewakarn	6	6
(Hong Kong) W-y Chan (India) N Chilumula	2	2
(India) P Bhambri (India) R Sunkara	6	6
WC	(India) A Andrady (India) S Burman	4	0
(South Korea) S-j Jang (South Korea) S-r Lee	2	3
(China) Y Xu (China) Y Zhou	6	6
(India) R Chakravarthi (India) A Raina	6^{4}	4
3	(Australia) M Adamczak (Australia) S Bengson	7^{7}	6
(Ukraine) O Savchuk (Ukraine) E Svitolina	6	6
(Thailand) L Kumkhum (Thailand) Vara Wongteanchai	3	3
(India) R Bhosale (India) P Thombare	3	3
2	(Russia) N Bratchikova (Georgia (country)) O Kalashnikova	6	6

Quarterfinals
1	(Czech Republic) E Birnerová (Slovenia) A Klepač	7^{7}	6
(Japan) K Date-Krumm (Japan) K Nara	6^{4}	4
4	(Israel) J Glushko (Thailand) N Lertcheewakarn	6	6
(India) P Bhambri (India) R Sunkara	1	3
(China) Y Xu (China) Y Zhou	6	6
3	(Australia) M Adamczak (Australia) S Bengson	3	2
(Ukraine) O Savchuk (Ukraine) E Svitolina	5	2
2	(Russia) N Bratchikova (Georgia (country)) O Kalashnikova	7	6

Semifinals
1	(Czech Republic) E Birnerová (Slovenia) A Klepač	3	4
4	(Israel) J Glushko (Thailand) N Lertcheewakarn	6	6
(China) Y Xu (China) Y Zhou	3	5
2	(Russia) N Bratchikova (Georgia (country)) O Kalashnikova	6	7

Final
4	(Israel) J Glushko (Thailand) N Lertcheewakarn	0	6	[8]
2	(Russia) N Bratchikova (Georgia (country)) O Kalashnikova	6	4	[10]
