= Oksana Kalashnikova =

Georgian tennis player (born 1990)

Oksana Kalashnikova ოქსანა კალაშნიკოვა
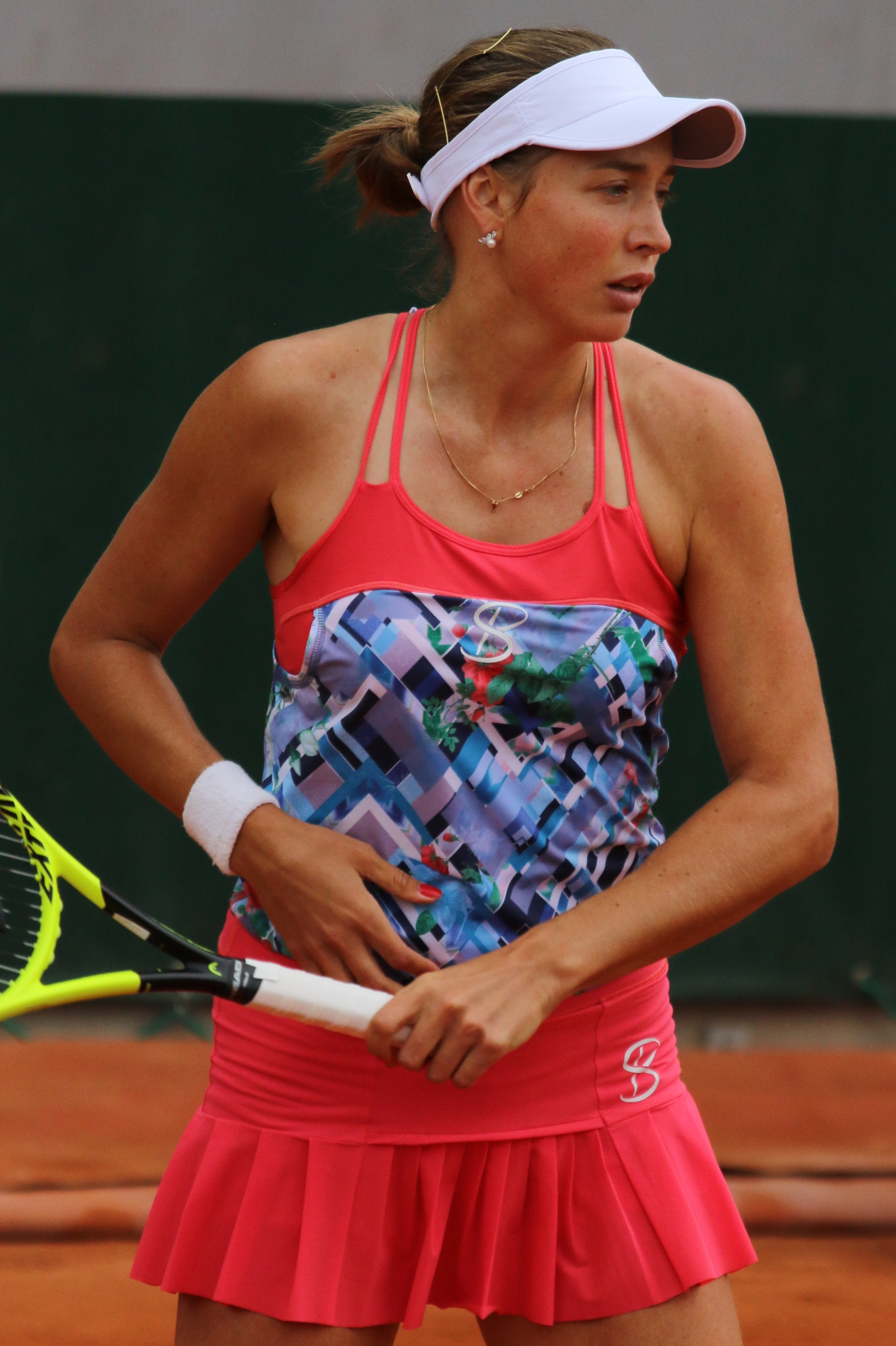
- Kalashnikova at the 2019 French Open
- Country (sports): Georgia
- Residence: Biel, Switzerland
- Born: 5 September 1990 (age 36) Tbilisi, Georgian SSR, Soviet Union
- Height: 1.84 m (6 ft 0 in)
- Plays: Left-handed (two-handed backhand)
- Prize money: $1,452,068

Singles
- Career record: 185–160
- Career titles: 0
- Highest ranking: No. 156 (7 June 2010)

Grand Slam singles results
- Australian Open: Q2 (2010, 2011)
- French Open: Q3 (2010)
- Wimbledon: Q1 (2010)
- US Open: Q1 (2009, 2010)

Doubles
- Career record: 418–408
- Career titles: 7
- Highest ranking: No. 42 (11 September 2023)

Grand Slam doubles results
- Australian Open: 3R (2016, 2023)
- French Open: 3R (2013)
- Wimbledon: QF (2023)
- US Open: 3R (2018)

Grand Slam mixed doubles results
- French Open: 1R (2016)
- Wimbledon: 3R (2014)

Team competitions
- Fed Cup: 29–17

Oksana Kalashnikova (Georgian: ოქსანა კალაშნიკოვა, romanized: oksana k'alashnik'ova, pronounced [okʰsana kʼalaʃnikʼova]; born 5 September 1990) is a Georgian inactive tennis player. She has a career-high doubles ranking by the WTA of No. 42, achieved on 11 September 2023. She also reached a best singles ranking of No. 156 on 7 June 2010, before suffering a lower back injury that led her to focus primarily on doubles.

Kalashnikova has won seven WTA Tour doubles titles and four doubles titles on WTA 125 tournaments, as well as five singles and 25 doubles titles on the ITF Circuit.

Playing for Georgia Billie Jean King Cup team since 2007, Kalashnikova has a win–loss record of 29–17 (as of September 2026).

== Career overview ==
=== Juniors ===
Kalashnikova had a remarkable junior career. At age 15, she won the prestigious 2005 Orange Bowl and peaked at No. 11 in the ITF jr. world rankings later that year. The following season she reached the US Open girls' singles semifinal, notably defeating Simona Halep in straight sets, before losing to eventual champion, Kristína Kučová.

=== 2012: Professional debut ===
Kalashnikova entered the ITF tournament in Astana, where she won the doubles event with Marta Sirotkina against twin sisters Lyudmyla and Nadiia Kichenok.

In November, she and Nina Bratchikova won the doubles title at the Royal Indian Open.

=== 2013: First WTA 250 title ===
She reached the third round of the French Open on her debut at this major, partnering Alicja Rosolska.

Kalashnikova won her first WTA doubles title at the 2013 Baku Cup, partnering Irina Buryachok against Eleni Daniilidou and Aleksandra Krunić.

After that, she and Alicja Rosolska reached the quarterfinals of the Canadian Open, a prestigious tournament serving as a warm-up for the US Open.

In September, she reached the final of the Ningbo International Tennis Open, a WTA 125 tournament, again partnering Buryachok.

=== 2014 ===
In July, at İstanbul Cup partnering Paula Kania, they reached the final and lost to Misaki Doi and Elina Svitolina.

=== 2015 ===
In July, Kalashnikova entered the Contrexéville Open and won the doubles competition against Constance Sibille & Irina Ramialison, partnering Danka Kovinić.

She then won her second title on WTA Tour at the Bucharest Open, partnering Demi Schuurs. They beat Romanian pairing of Andreea Mitu & Patricia Maria Țig in the final.

In November, she lost two WTA 125 doubles finals, at the Open de Limoges, partnering Margarita Gasparyan, and the Southern California Open, partnering with Tatjana Maria.

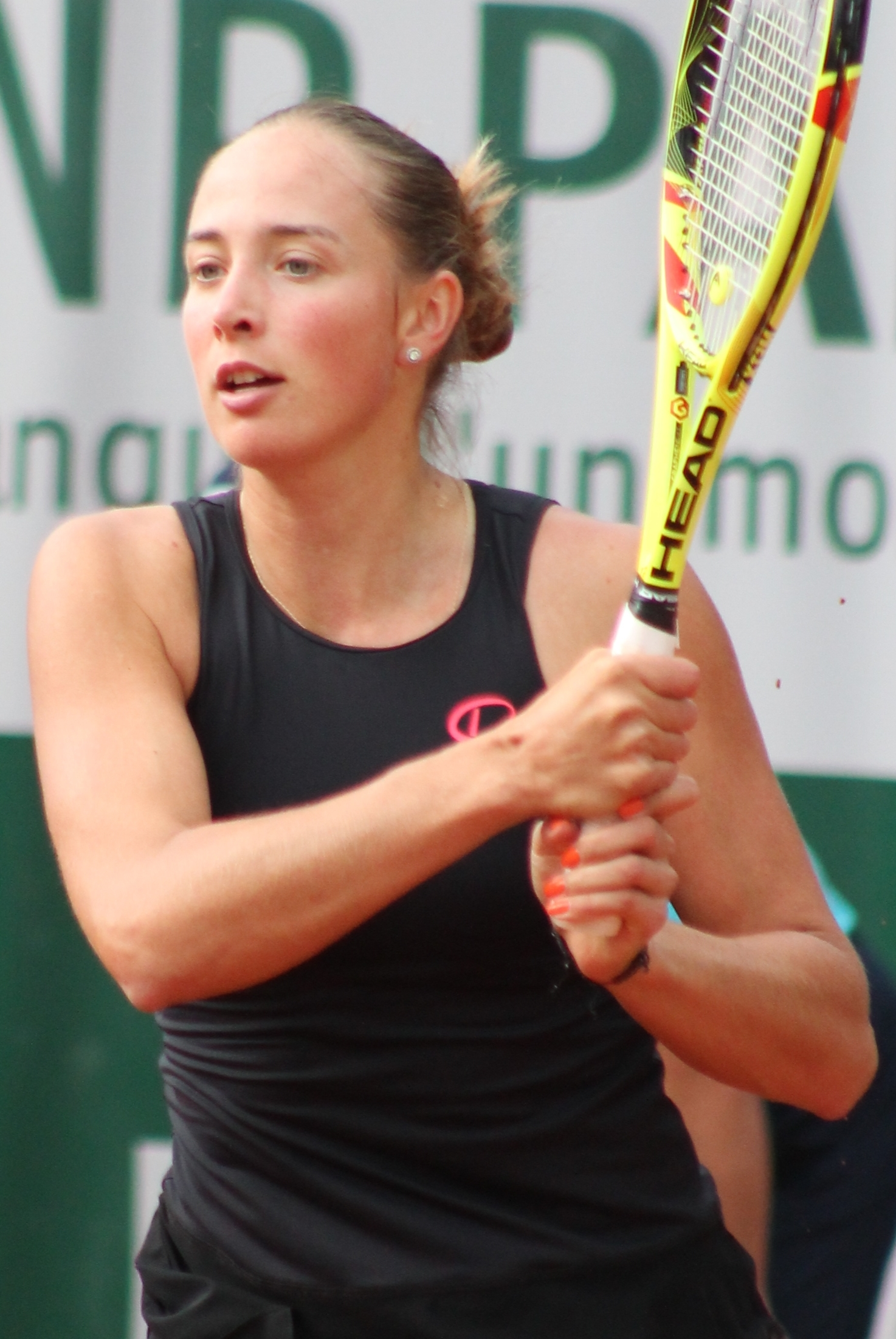
Kalashnikova at the 2016 French Open.

=== 2016: Indian Wells semifinalist, top 50 ===
She made the third round at the Australian Open for the first time at this major.

She reached her first semifinal at a Premier-level in Indian Wells, partnering Sara Errani.

On 13 June 2016, she reached a career-high doubles ranking of No. 43.

=== 2023: Wimbledon quarterfinalist, Elite Trophy ===
At the Australian Open, Kalashnikova reached the third round for the second time at this major, partnering Alycia Parks but lost in straight sets to top seeds and eventual champions Czech duo Kateřina Siniaková and Barbora Krejčíková.

Partnering Iryna Shymanovich, she reached her first major quarterfinal at Wimbledon, where they lost to 16th seeds Zhang Shuai and Caroline Dolehide in straight sets, in one hour.

Alongside Nao Hibino, Kalashnikova won the doubles title at the Prague Open with a win over Quinn Gleason and Elixane Lechemia in the final.

She was selected to play in the 2023 WTA Elite Trophy with Yana Sizikova with whom she had also partnered earlier for the WTA 1000 tournaments during the clay court season. They lost to the eventual champions Beatriz Haddad Maia and Veronika Kudermetova.

=== 2024: WTA 500 finalist ===
Partnering Kamilla Rakhimova, she reached the final of the WTA 500 Guadalajara Open with wins over Camila Osorio and Ena Shibahara, Marina Stakusic and Valeria Savinykh then Eden Silva and Samantha Murray Sharan in the semifinals. Kalashnikova and Rakhimova lost the final to Anna Danilina and Irina Khromacheva.

== Performance timelines ==
Key
W	F	SF	QF	#R	RR	Q#	P#	DNQ	A	Z#	PO	G	S	B	NMS	NTI	P	NH

(W) winner; (F) finalist; (SF) semifinalist; (QF) quarterfinalist; (#R) rounds 4, 3, 2, 1; (RR) round-robin stage; (Q#) qualification round; (P#) preliminary round; (DNQ) did not qualify; (A) absent; (Z#) Davis/Fed Cup Zonal Group (with number indication) or (PO) play-off; (G) gold, (S) silver or (B) bronze Olympic/Paralympic medal; (NMS) not a Masters tournament; (NTI) not a Tier I tournament; (P) postponed; (NH) not held; (SR) strike rate (events won / competed); (W–L) win–loss record.
To avoid confusion and double counting, these charts are updated at the conclusion of a tournament or when the player's participation has ended.

Only main-draw results in WTA Tour, Grand Slam tournaments, Fed Cup/Billie Jean King Cup and Olympic Games are included in win–loss records.

=== Doubles ===
Current through the 2025 WTA Tour.

Tournament	2010	2011	2012	2013	2014	2015	2016	2017	2018	2019	2020	2021	2022	2023	2024	2025	SR	W–L	Win %
Grand Slam tournaments
Australian Open	A	A	A	A	1R	1R	3R	1R	2R	1R	1R	1R	1R	3R	1R	1R	0 / 12	5–12	29%
French Open	A	A	A	3R	2R	1R	1R	1R	2R	2R	2R	2R	1R	1R	1R	2R	0 / 13	8–13	38%
Wimbledon	Q2	A	A	2R	1R	A	1R	1R	1R	2R	NH	3R	1R	QF	1R	1R	0 / 11	7–11	39%
US Open	A	A	A	1R	2R	1R	1R	A	3R	2R	2R	1R	1R	1R	1R	1R	0 / 12	5–12	29%
Win–loss	0–0	0–0	0–0	3–3	2–4	0–3	2–4	0–3	4–4	3–4	2–3	3–4	0–4	5–4	0–4	1–4	0 / 48	25–48	34%
Year-end championships
WTA Elite Trophy (Note: WTA Tournament of Champions was held from 2009 to 2014, when WTA Elite Trophy replaced it.)	DNQ						RR	DNQ		RR	NH			RR	DNQ		0 / 3	1–3	25%
WTA 1000
Dubai / Qatar Open (Note: The first Premier 5 event of the year has switched back and forth between the Dubai Tennis Championships and the Qatar Ladies Open since 2009. Dubai was classified as a Premier 5 event from 2009 to 2011 before being succeeded by Doha for the 2012–2014 period. In 2015, Dubai regained its Premier 5 status while Doha was demoted to Premier status. The Premier 5 tournaments were reclassified as WTA 1000 tournaments in 2021.)	A	A	A	A	2R	1R	1R	A	1R	A	1R	1R	1R	1R	2R	A	0 / 10	2–10	17%
Indian Wells Open	A	A	A	A	1R	A	SF	1R	A	A	NH	A	A	A	1R	A	0 / 4	3–4	43%
Miami Open	A	A	A	A	2R (Note: Withdrawal before second-round match, not counted as a loss)	A	A	1R	A	A	NH	A	A	A	2R	A	0 / 3	2-2	50%
Madrid Open	A	A	A	2R	1R	A	1R	A	A	A	NH	1R	1R	2R	A	A	0 / 6	2–6	25%
Italian Open	A	A	A	1R	1R	A	2R	A	A	A	1R	A	A	1R	A	A	0 / 5	1–5	17%
Canadian Open	A	A	A	QF	1R	A	A	A	A	A	NH	1R	1R	A	A	A	0 / 4	2–4	33%
Cincinnati Open	A	A	A	A	1R	A	2R	A	A	A	1R	A	A	1R	A	A	0 / 4	1–4	20%
Guadalajara Open	NH												A	1R	NMS	A	0 / 1	0–1	0%
Pan Pacific / Wuhan Open (Note: In 2014, the Pan Pacific Open was downgraded to a Premier event and replaced by the Wuhan Open. The Premier 5 tournaments were reclassified as WTA 1000 tournaments in 2021.)	A	A	A	A	1R	A	1R	A	A	2R	NH				A	A	0 / 3	1–3	25%
China Open	A	A	A	1R	1R	A	QF	A	1R	A	NH			1R	A	A	0 / 5	2–5	29%
Career statistics
Tournaments	2	0	3	16	29	20	27	17	25	24	13	28	19	10	31	4	Career total: 233		
Titles	0	0	0	1	0	1	1	1	0	0	0	0	1	0	0	0	Career total: 5		
Finals	0	0	0	1	1	1	1	2	1	1	0	0	1	0	1	0	Career total: 9		
Overall win–loss	0–2	0–0	3–3	12–15	15–28	12–19	22–26	15–16	12–25	15–25	2–13	12–28	10–18	26–33	25–30	4–4	5 / 237	140–232	38%
Year-end ranking	163	260	110	52	73	78	43	70	76	60	63	75	72	43	66	83	$1,452,068		

== WTA Tour finals ==
=== Doubles: 14 (7 titles, 7 runner-ups) ===
Legend WTA 1000 WTA 500 (0–1) WTA 250 (7–6)	Finals by surface Hard (3–5) Clay (3–2) Grass (1–0)	Finals by setting Outdoor (6–6) Indoor (1–1)

Result	W–L	Date	Tournament	Tier	Surface	Partner	Opponents	Score
Win	1–0	Jul 2013	Baku Cup, Azerbaijan	International (Note: The WTA International tournaments were reclassified as WTA 250 tournaments in 2021.)	Hard	(Ukraine) Irina Buryachok	(Greece) Eleni Daniilidou (Serbia) Aleksandra Krunić	4–6, 7–6^{(7–3)}, [10–4]
Loss	1–1	Jul 2014	İstanbul Cup, Turkey	International	Hard	(Poland) Paula Kania	(Japan) Misaki Doi (Ukraine) Elina Svitolina	4–6, 0–6
Win	2–1	Jul 2015	Bucharest Open, Romania	International	Clay	(Netherlands) Demi Schuurs	(Romania) Andreea Mitu (Romania) Patricia Maria Țig	6–2, 6–2
Win	3–1	Jun 2016	Rosmalen Open, Netherlands	International	Grass	(Kazakhstan) Yaroslava Shvedova	(Switzerland) Xenia Knoll (Serbia) Aleksandra Krunić	6–1, 6–1
Win	4–1	Feb 2017	Hungarian Ladies Open, Hungary	International	Hard (i)	(Chinese Taipei) Hsieh Su-wei	(Australia) Arina Rodionova (Kazakhstan) Galina Voskoboeva	6–3, 4–6, [10–4]
Loss	4–2	Sep 2017	Tashkent Open, Uzbekistan	International	Hard	(Japan) Nao Hibino	(Hungary) Tímea Babos (Czech Republic) Andrea Hlaváčková	5–7, 4–6
Loss	4–3	Feb 2018	Taipei Open, Taiwan	International	Hard (i)	(Japan) Nao Hibino	(China) Duan Yingying (China) Wang Yafan	6–7^{(4–7)}, 6–7^{(5–7)}
Loss	4–4	May 2019	Rabat Grand Prix, Morocco	International	Clay	(Spain) Georgina García Pérez	(Spain) María José Martínez Sánchez (Spain) Sara Sorribes Tormo	5–7, 1–6
Win	5–4	Jul 2022	Budapest Grand Prix, Hungary	WTA 250	Clay	(Georgia (country)) Ekaterine Gorgodze	(Poland) Katarzyna Piter (Belgium) Kimberley Zimmermann	1–6, 6–4, [10–6]
Loss	5–5	Apr 2023	Copa Colsanitas, Colombia	WTA 250	Clay	(Poland) Katarzyna Piter	(Russia) Irina Khromacheva (Belarus) Iryna Shymanovich	1–6, 6–3, [6–10]
Win	6–5	Aug 2023	Prague Open, Czech Republic	WTA 250	Hard	(Japan) Nao Hibino	(United States) Quinn Gleason (France) Elixane Lechemia	6–7^{(7–9)}, 7–5, [10–3]
Loss	6–6	Oct 2023	Hong Kong Open, China SAR	WTA 250	Hard	(Russia) Aliaksandra Sasnovich	(China) Tang Qianhui (Chinese Taipei) Tsao Chia-yi	5–7, 6–1, [9–11]
Loss	6–7	Sep 2024	Guadalajara Open, Mexico	WTA 500	Hard	(Russia) Kamilla Rakhimova	(Kazakhstan) Anna Danilina (Russia) Irina Khromacheva	6–2, 5–7, [7–10]
Win	7–7	May 2025	Rabat Grand Prix, Morocco	WTA 250	Clay	(Australia) Maya Joint	(Italy) Angelica Moratelli (Italy) Camilla Rosatello	6–3, 7–5

== WTA 125 finals ==
=== Doubles: 16 (4 titles, 12 runner-ups) ===
Result	W–L	Date	Tournament	Surface	Partner	Opponents	Score
Win	1–0	Nov 2012	Royal Indian Open, India	Hard	(Russia) Nina Bratchikova	(Israel) Julia Glushko (Thailand) Noppawan Lertcheewakarn	6–0, 4–6, [10–8]
Loss	1–1	Sep 2013	Ningbo Open, China	Hard	(Ukraine) Irina Buryachok	(Chinese Taipei) Chan Yung-jan (China) Zhang Shuai	2–6, 1–6
Loss	1–2	Nov 2015	Open de Limoges, France	Hard (i)	(Russia) Margarita Gasparyan	(Czech Republic) Barbora Krejčíková (Luxembourg) Mandy Minella	6–1, 5–7, [6–10]
Loss	1–3	Nov 2015	Carlsbad Classic, US	Hard	(Germany) Tatjana Maria	(Paraguay) Verónica Cepede Royg (Brazil) Gabriela Cé	6–1, 4–6, [8–10]
Win	2–3	Sep 2019	New Haven Challenger, US	Hard	(Russia) Anna Blinkova	(United States) Usue Maitane Arconada (United States) Jamie Loeb	6–2, 4–6, [10–4]
Loss	2–4	Dec 2019	Open de Limoges, France	Hard (i)	(Russia) Ekaterina Alexandrova	(Spain) Georgina García Pérez (Spain) Sara Sorribes Tormo	2–6, 6–7^{(3–7)}
Loss	2–5	May 2022	Trophée Clarins, France	Clay	(Japan) Miyu Kato	(Brazil) Beatriz Haddad Maia (France) Kristina Mladenovic	7–5, 4–6, [4–10]
Loss	2–6	Jun 2022	Veneto Open, Italy	Grass	(Russia) Vitalia Diatchenko	(United States) Madison Brengle (United States) Claire Liu	4–6, 3–6
Loss	2–7	Oct 2022	Open de Rouen, France	Hard (i)	(Japan) Misaki Doi	(Georgia (country)) Natela Dzalamidze (Russia) Kamilla Rakhimova	2–6, 5–7
Win	3–7	Dec 2022	Open de Limoges, France	Hard (i)	(Ukraine) Marta Kostyuk	(United Kingdom) Alicia Barnett (United Kingdom) Olivia Nicholls	7–5, 6–1
Loss	3–8	Apr 2023	San Luis Open, Mexico	Clay	(Poland) Katarzyna Piter	(Spain) Aliona Bolsova (Venezuela) Andrea Gámiz	6–7^{(5–7)}, 4–6
Loss	3–9	Dec 2023	Open de Limoges, France	Hard (i)	(United Kingdom) Maia Lumsden	(Spain) Cristina Bucșa (Russia) Yana Sizikova	4–6, 1–6
Loss	3–10	Jun 2024	Makarska Open, Croatia	Clay	(Japan) Nao Hibino	(United States) Sabrina Santamaria (Belarus) Iryna Shymanovich	4–6, 6–3, [6–10]
Win	4–10	Jul 2024	Contrexéville Open, France	Clay	(Belarus) Iryna Shymanovich	(Chinese Taipei) Wu Fang-hsien (China) Zhang Shuai	5–7, 6–3, [10–7]
Loss	4–11	May 2025	Open de Saint-Malo, France	Clay	(Italy) Angelica Moratelli	(United Kingdom) Maia Lumsden (Japan) Makoto Ninomiya	5–7, 2–6
Loss	4–12	Jun 2025	Makarska Open, Croatia	Clay	(Russia) Elena Pridankina	(Czech Republic) Jesika Malečková (Czech Republic) Miriam Škoch	6–2, 3–6, [4–10]

== ITF Circuit finals ==
=== Singles: 10 (5 titles, 5 runner-ups) ===
Legend
$25,000 tournaments (4–3)
$10,000 tournaments (1–2)

Result	W–L	Date	Tournament	Tier	Surface	Opponent	Score
Win	1–0	Oct 2008	ITF San Luis Potosí, Mexico	25,000	Hard	(Portugal) Frederica Piedade	7–5, 4–6, 6–4
Win	2–0	Mar 2009	ITF Giza, Egypt	10,000	Clay	(Spain) Eva Fernández-Brugués	6–4, 4–6, 6–3
Loss	2–1	Mar 2009	ITF Giza, Egypt	10,000	Clay	(Russia) Galina Fokina	4–6, 2–6
Loss	2–2	Mar 2009	ITF Kharkiv, Ukraine	25,000	Clay	(Ukraine) Kristina Antoniychuk	6–4, 4–6, 1–6
Win	3–2	Jun 2009	Bella Cup Torun, Poland	25,000	Clay	(Belarus) Ksenia Milevskaya	3–6, 6–4, 6–2
Loss	3–3	Jul 2009	ITF Almaty, Kazakhstan	25,000	Hard	(Russia) Elena Chalova	3–6, 4–6
Win	4–3	Sep 2009	Batumi Ladies Open, Georgia	25,000	Clay	(Georgia (country)) Sofia Shapatava	4–6, 6–3, 6–2
Win	5–3	Oct 2010	ITF Kharkiv, Ukraine	25,000	Carpet (i)	(Russia) Daria Kuchmina	7–5, 4–6, 6–4
Loss	5–4	Apr 2013	ITF Namangan, Uzbekistan	25,000	Hard	(Ukraine) Nadiia Kichenok	2–6, 3–6
Loss	5–5	Apr 2013	ITF Andijan, Uzbekistan	10,000	Hard	(Ukraine) Anastasiya Vasylyeva	4–6, 5–7

=== Doubles: 35 (25 titles, 10 runner-ups) ===
Legend $100,000 tournaments (3–1) $75,000 tournaments (1–0) $50,000 tournaments (1–3) $25,000 tournaments (11–6) $10,000 tournaments (9–0)

Result	W–L	Date	Tournament	Tier	Surface	Partner	Opponents	Score
Loss	0–1	Apr 2007	ITF Antalya, Turkey	25,000	Hard	(Georgia (country)) Sofia Kvatsabaia	(Serbia) Vojislava Lukić (Bulgaria) Dessislava Mladenova	6–2, 2–6, 3–6
Win	1–1	Jul 2007	ITF Garching, Germany	10,000	Clay	(Finland) Katariina Tuohimaa	(Austria) Franziska Klotz (Italy) Evelyn Mayr	7–5, 6–3
Win	2–1	Mar 2008	ITF Cairo, Egypt	10,000	Clay	(Russia) Galina Fokina	(Russia) Elena Chalova (Russia) Inna Sokolova	6–4, 6–2
Win	3–1	Mar 2008	ITF Cairo, Egypt	10,000	Clay	(Russia) Galina Fokina	(Russia) Anna Savitskaya (Netherlands) Bibiane Schoofs	7–6^{(7)}, 6–4
Loss	3–2	May 2008	ITF Antalya, Turkey	25,000	Clay	(Turkey) Pemra Özgen	(Austria) Melanie Klaffner (Belarus) Ksenia Milevskaya	2–6, 5–7
Win	4–2	Jul 2008	ITF Kharkiv, Ukraine	25,000	Clay	(Romania) Mihaela Buzărnescu	(Ukraine) Kristina Antoniychuk (Ukraine) Lesia Tsurenko	6–1, 6–4
Win	5–2	Sep 2008	ITF Innsbruck, Austria	10,000	Clay	(Ukraine) Irina Buryachok	(Switzerland) Conny Perrin (Switzerland) Nicole Riner	3–6, 6–3, [10–7]
Win	6–2	Sep 2008	ITF Casale Monferrato, Italy	10,000	Clay	(Portugal) Catarina Ferreira	(Switzerland) Nicole Riner (Switzerland) Amra Sadiković	7–5, 7–6
Win	7–2	Mar 2009	ITF Giza, Egypt	10,000	Clay	(Morocco) Fatima El Allami	(Netherlands) Marlot Meddens (Netherlands) Bibiane Weijers	6–4, 6–2
Loss	7–3	Mar 2009	ITF Khanty-Mansiysk, Russia	50,000	Carpet (i)	(Russia) Valeria Savinykh	(Belarus) Ksenia Milevskaya (Ukraine) Lesia Tsurenko	2–6, 3–6
Win	8–3	Jun 2009	ITF Qarshi, Uzbekistan	25,000	Hard	(Ukraine) Kristina Antoniychuk	(Turkey) Pemra Özgen (Turkey) Çağla Büyükakçay	5–7, 6–0, [10–6]
Win	9–3	Aug 2009	ITF Almaty, Kazakhstan	25,000	Hard	(Russia) Elena Chalova	(Russia) Nina Bratchikova (Romania) Ágnes Szatmári	6–1, 6–0
Win	10–3	Sep 2009	ITF Napoli, Italy	25,000	Clay	(Russia) Nina Bratchikova	(Argentina) Betina Jozami (Argentina) María Irigoyen	7–6^{(5)}, 2–6, [10–8]
Win	11–3	Oct 2009	Open de Limoges, France	25,000	Clay	(Russia) Elena Chalova	(France) Florence Haring (France) Violette Huck	4–6, 6–3, [10–4]
Win	12–3	Dec 2009	Dubai Tennis Challenge, UAE	75,000	Hard	(Germany) Julia Görges	(Czech Republic) Vladimíra Uhlířová (Czech Republic) Renata Voráčová	4–6, 6–2, [10–8]
Loss	12–4	Sep 2010	Telavi Open, Georgia	25,000	Clay	(Austria) Melanie Klaffner	(Ukraine) Veronika Kapshay (Romania) Ágnes Szatmári	1–6, 6–2, [8–10]
Win	13–4	Oct 2010	ITF Istanbul, Turkey	25,000	Hard	(Russia) Marta Sirotkina	(Russia) Ekaterina Bychkova (France) Iryna Brémond	6–3, 6–1
Win	14–4	Nov 2010	ITF Opole, Poland	25,000	Carpet (i)	(Belarus) Polina Pekhova	(Poland) Paula Kania (Poland) Magda Linette	6–3, 6–4
Loss	14–5	Jan 2011	Blossom Cup, China	50,000	Hard	(Ukraine) Yuliya Beygelzimer	(China) Liu Wanting (China) Sun Shengnan	3–6, 2–6
Win	15–5	Feb 2012	ITF Moscow, Russia	25,000	Hard (i)	(Russia) Marta Sirotkina	(Russia) Tatiana Kotelnikova (Belarus) Lidziya Marozava	7–6^{(2)}, 4–6, [11–9]
Win	16–5	Mar 2012	ITF Almaty, Kazakhstan	25,000	Hard	(Russia) Eugeniya Pashkova	(Uzbekistan) Albina Khabibulina (Belarus) Ilona Kremen	6–1, 7–5
Win	17–5	Apr 2012	ITF Namangan, Uzbekistan	25,000	Hard	(Russia) Marta Sirotkina	(United Kingdom) Naomi Broady (Poland) Paula Kania	6–2, 7–5
Win	18–5	Apr 2012	ITF Antalya, Turkey	10,000	Hard	(Georgia (country)) Sofia Kvatsabaia	(Romania) Ana Bogdan (Russia) Maria Mokh	6–4, 6–4
Loss	18–6	Jun 2012	ITF Ystad, Sweden	25,000	Hard	(Slovakia) Lenka Wienerová	(Poland) Magda Linette (Poland) Katarzyna Piter	3–6, 3–6
Win	19–6	Jul 2012	President's Cup, Kazakhstan	100k	Hard	(Russia) Marta Sirotkina	(Ukraine) Lyudmyla Kichenok (Ukraine) Nadiia Kichenok	3–6, 6–4, [10–2]
Loss	19–7	Sep 2012	Telavi Open, Georgia	50k	Clay	(Belarus) Ekaterina Dzehalevich	(Hungary) Réka Luca Jani (Germany) Christina Shakovets	6–3, 4–6, [6–10]
Win	20–7	Mar 2013	ITF Antalya, Turkey	10k	Hard	(Kyrgyzstan) Ksenia Palkina	(United States) Anamika Bhargava (United States) Nicole Melichar	6–1, 6–3
Win	21–7	Mar 2013	ITF Antalya, Turkey	10k	Hard	(Kyrgyzstan) Ksenia Palkina	(Turkey) Başak Eraydın (Australia) Abbie Myers	6–4, 4–6, [10–8]
Win	22–7	Jul 2013	ITF Istanbul, Turkey	25k	Hard	(Ukraine) Lyudmyla Kichenok	(Ukraine) Alona Fomina (Slovenia) Anja Prislan	6–2, 4–6, [10–7]
Win	23–7	Sep 2013	Trabzon Cup, Turkey	50k	Hard	(Serbia) Aleksandra Krunić	(Armenia) Ani Amiraghyan (Slovenia) Dalila Jakupović	6–2, 6–1
Loss	23–8	Dec 2013	ITF Navi Mumbai, India	25k	Hard	(Latvia) Diāna Marcinkēviča	(United Kingdom) Jocelyn Rae (United Kingdom) Anna Smith	4–6, 6–7^{(5)}
Loss	23–9	Dec 2014	Pune Championships, India	25k	Hard	(Ukraine) Anastasiya Vasylyeva	(Russia) Anna Morgina (Serbia) Nina Stojanović	6–7^{(7)}, 4–6
Win	24–9	Jul 2015	Contrexéville Open, France	100k	Clay	(Montenegro) Danka Kovinić	(France) Constance Sibille (France) Irina Ramialison	2–6, 6–3, [10–6]
Win	25–9	Jul 2019	Contrexéville Open, France (2)	W100	Clay	(Spain) Georgina Garcia Perez	(Kazakhstan) Anna Danilina (Netherlands) Eva Wacanno	6–3, 6–3
Loss	25–10	Aug 2024	Cary Tennis Classic, US	W100	Hard	(Belarus) Iryna Shymanovich	(Switzerland) Céline Naef (Slovenia) Tamara Zidanšek	6–4, 3–6, [9–11]
