= Nina Bratchikova =

Russian tennis player (born 1985)

Nina Bratchikova Нина Братчикова
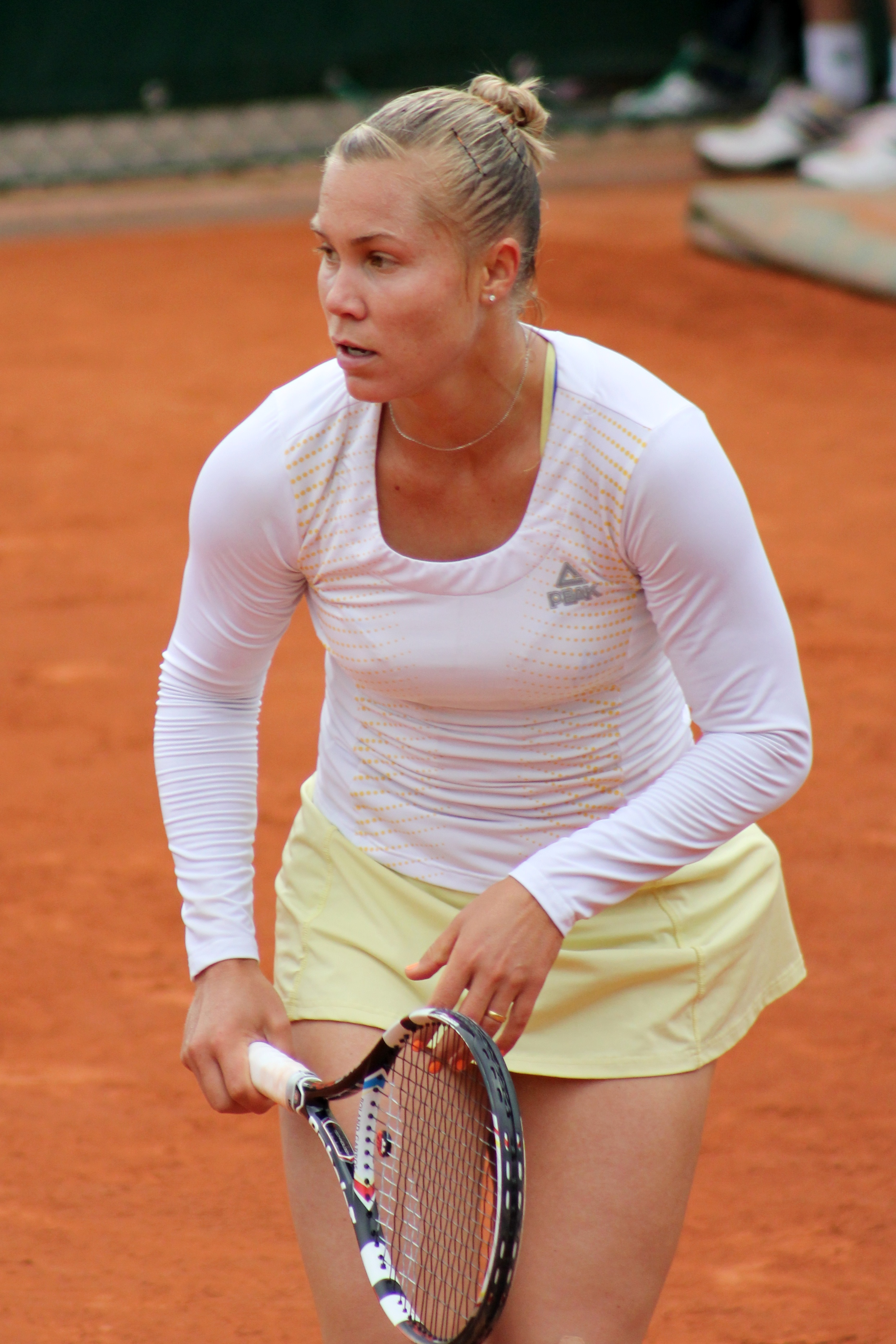
- Bratchikova at the 2013 French Open
- Country (sports): Russia
- Residence: Tavira, Portugal
- Born: 28 June 1985 (age 40) Zhukovsky, Russian SFSR, Soviet Union
- Height: 1.78 m (5 ft 10 in)
- Turned pro: 2004
- Plays: Right-handed (two-handed backhand)
- Prize money: $776,195

Singles
- Career record: 363–302
- Career titles: 9 ITF
- Highest ranking: No. 79 (10 December 2012)

Grand Slam singles results
- Australian Open: 3R (2012)
- French Open: 3R (2012)
- Wimbledon: 1R (2012, 2013)
- US Open: 1R (2012)

Doubles
- Career record: 357–205
- Career titles: 1 WTA Challenger, 35 ITF
- Highest ranking: No. 63 (10 September 2012)

Grand Slam doubles results
- Australian Open: 1R (2012)
- French Open: 3R (2012)
- Wimbledon: 1R (2012)
- US Open: 2R (2012)

Nina Bratchikova (Russian: Нина Олеговна Братчикова; born 28 June 1985) is a Russian former professional tennis player.

Bratchikova won one doubles title on the WTA Challenger Tour, and in addition nine singles and 35 doubles titles on the ITF Women's Circuit. On 10 December 2012, she reached her best singles ranking of world No. 79. On 10 September 2012, she peaked at No. 63 in the doubles rankings.

== Tennis career ==
=== 2010 ===
In 2010, Bratchikova entered the ITF tournament in Moscow, where she won the doubles event partnering French Irena Pavlovic against Ukrainian sisters Lyudmyla Kichenok & Nadiia Kichenok.

She also won the ITF singles event in Johannesburg, beating Tamarine Tanasugarn in the final.

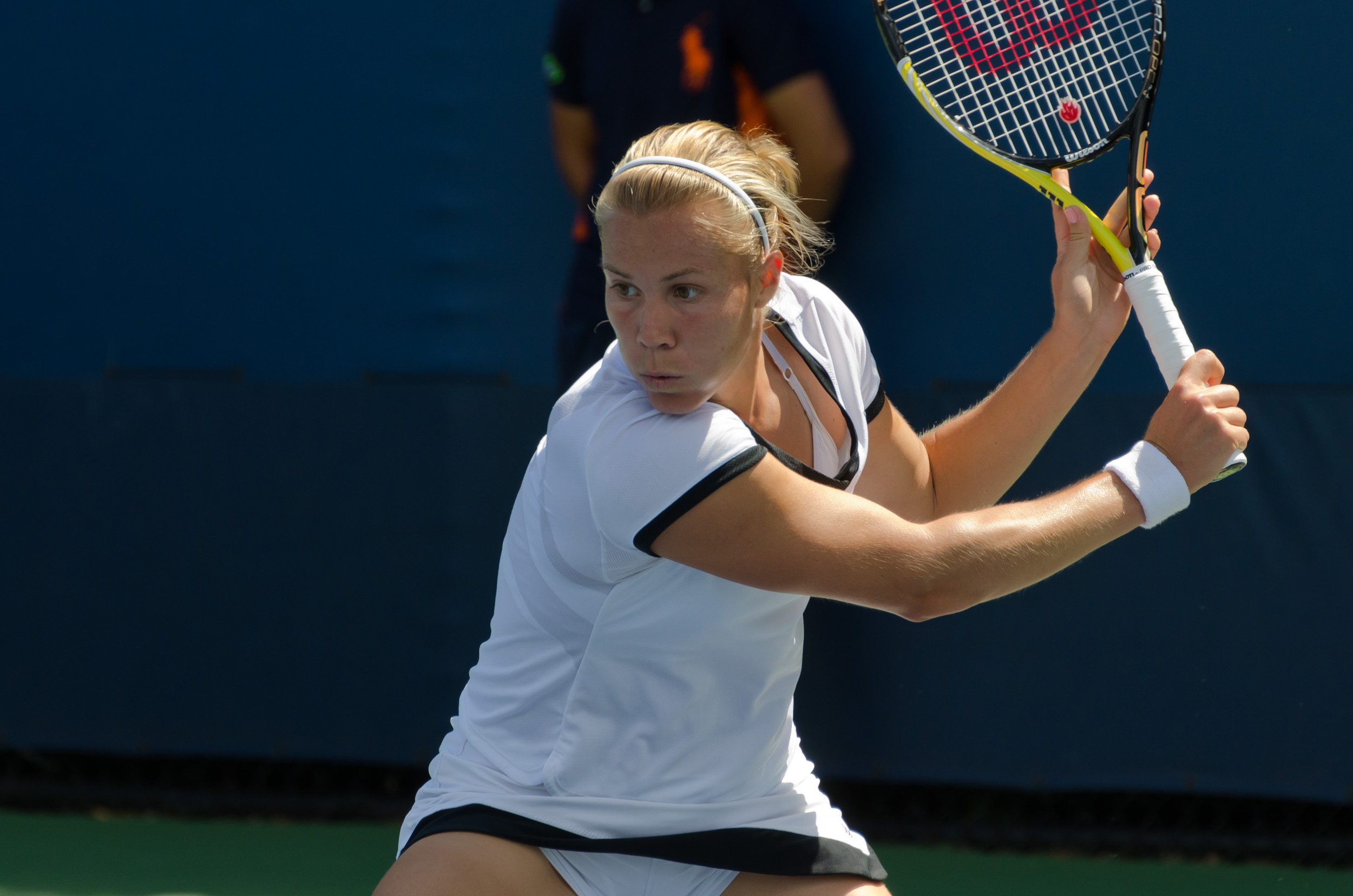
Nina Bratchikova in-action during the 2011 US Open qualifying

=== 2012 ===
In January, Bratchikova qualified and made it to the third round of the Australian Open main draw in which she beat Flavia Pennetta in the first round, Alberta Brianti in the second and lost to Iveta Benešová. She made her top-100 debut (No. 92) the following week.

In May, she reached to the third round of French Open, beating Monica Niculescu, Clair Feuerstein and losing against Petra Kvitova in three sets.

In November, she won the doubles title at the WTA Challenger Royal Indian Open, together with Georgian Oksana Kalashnikova.

=== 2013 ===
In January, Bratchikova lost in the first round of the Australian Open to Kirsten Flipkens. Two weeks later, she reached semifinals of the Pattaya Open, winning against Shahar Pe'er, Daniela Hantuchova, Ayumi Morita and losing to Sabine Lisicki.

In July, Bratchikova lost in the first round in Budapest to world No. 71, María Teresa Torró. But in doubles with Anna Tatishvili, she reached the final and lost against Andrea Hlaváčková and Lucie Hradecká in straight sets. A week later, Bratchikova played in Båstad and defeated No. 331, Lesley Kerkhove. In the second round, she lost to world No. 76, Johanna Larsson, in two sets.

In August, Bratchikova beat in the first round of the qualifying to the US Open world No. 201, Anne Schäfer. In the second round, she lost to world No. 166, Chanel Simmonds, by 0–6, 2–6.

== Grand Slam performance timelines ==
Key
W	F	SF	QF	#R	RR	Q#	DNQ	A	NH

(W) winner; (F) finalist; (SF) semifinalist; (QF) quarterfinalist; (#R) rounds 4, 3, 2, 1; (RR) round-robin stage; (Q#) qualification round; (DNQ) did not qualify; (A) absent; (NH) not held; (SR) strike rate (events won / competed); (W–L) win–loss record.

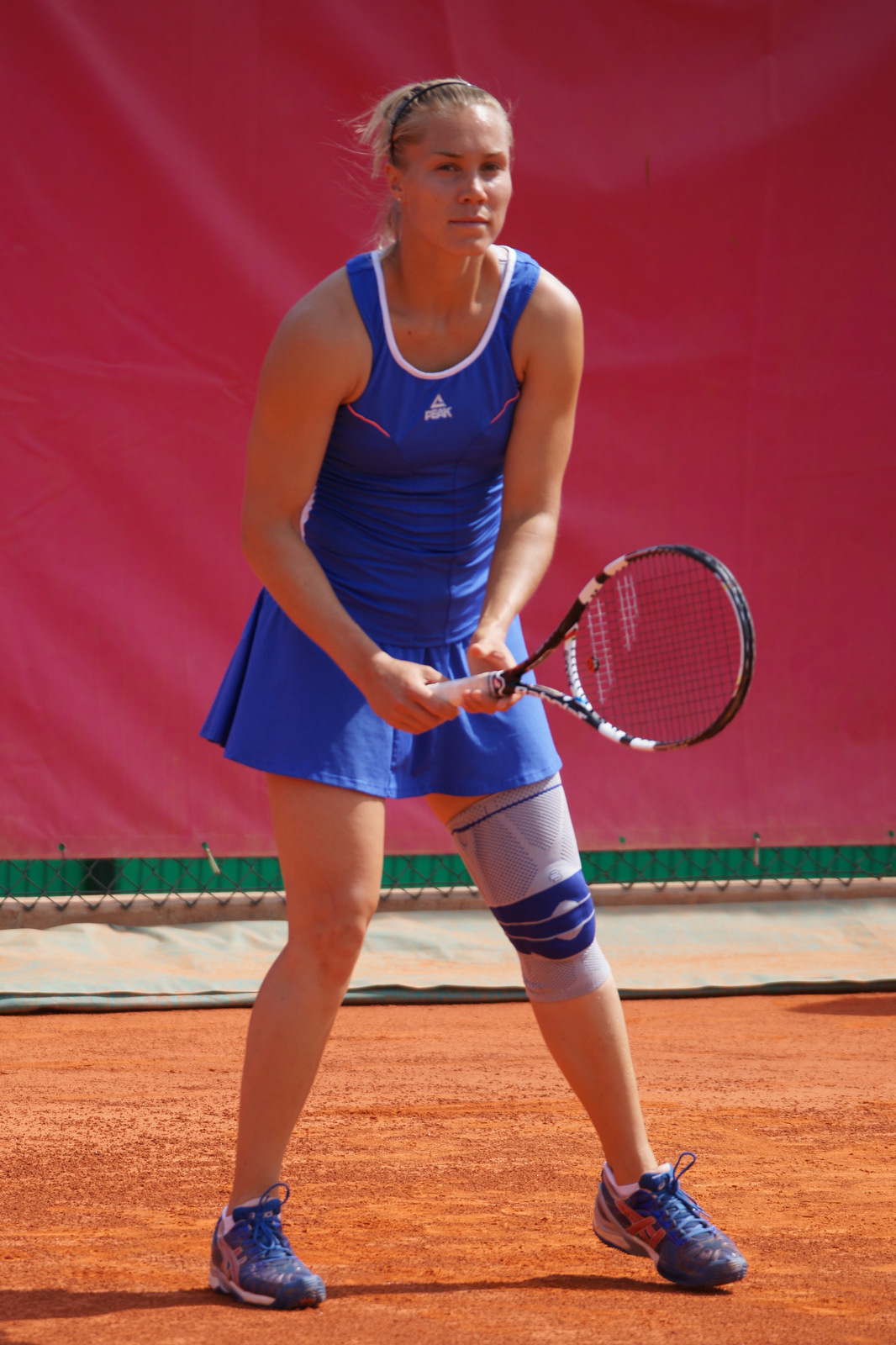
Bratchikova at Cagnes-sur-Mer, 2013

=== Singles ===
Tournament	2012	2013	2014	W–L
Australian Open	3R	1R	A	2–2
French Open	3R	1R	A	2–2
Wimbledon	1R	1R	A	0–2
US Open	1R	Q2	A	0–1
Win–loss	4–4	0–3	0–0	4–7

=== Doubles ===
Tournament	2012	2013	2014	W–L
Australian Open	1R	1R	A	0–2
French Open	3R	2R	A	3–2
Wimbledon	1R	Q1	A	0–1
US Open	2R	1R	A	1–2
Win–loss	3–4	1–3	0–0	4–7

== WTA Tour finals ==
=== Doubles: 3 (3 runner-ups) ===
Legend Grand Slam tournaments Premier M & Premier 5 Premier International (0–3)	Finals by surface Hard (0–1) Grass (0–0) Clay (0–2) Carpet (0–0)

Result	W–L	Date	Tournament	Surface	Partner	Opponents	Score
Loss	1.	Oct 2008	Tashkent Open, Uzbekistan	Hard	(Germany) Kathrin Wörle	(Romania) Raluca Olaru (Ukraine) Olga Savchuk	7–5, 5–7, [7–10]
Loss	2.	Apr 2011	Rabat Grand Prix, Morocco	Clay	(Austria) Sandra Klemenschits	(Czech Republic) Andrea Hlaváčková (Czech Republic) Renata Voráčová	3–6, 4–6
Loss	3.	Jul 2013	Budapest Grand Prix, Hungary	Clay	(Georgia (country)) Anna Tatishvili	(Czech Republic) Andrea Hlaváčková (Czech Republic) Lucie Hradecká	4–6, 1–6

== WTA Challenger finals ==
=== Doubles: 1 (title) ===
Result	W–L	Date	Tournament	Surface	Partner	Opponents	Score
Win	1–0	Nov 2012	Royal Indian Open, Pune	Hard	(Georgia (country)) Oksana Kalashnikova	(Israel) Julia Glushko (Thailand) Noppawan Lertcheewakarn	6–0, 4–6, [10–8]

== ITF Circuit finals ==
=== Singles: 17 (9–8) ===
Legend $100,000 tournaments $25,000 tournaments $10,000 tournaments	Finals by surface Hard (5–5) Clay (4–3)

Result	No.	Date	Tournament	Tier	Surface	Opponent	Score
Loss	1.	12 May 2002	ITF Zaton, Croatia	10,000	Clay	(Romania) Delia Sescioreanu	4–6, 4–6
Loss	2.	1 June 2003	ITF Campobasso, Italy	10,000	Clay	(Colombia) Catalina Castaño	2–6, 2–6
Win	1.	6 December 2003	ITF Tel Aviv, Israel	10,000	Hard	(Israel) Shahar Pe'er	6–4, 6–4
Win	2.	7 March 2004	ITF Melilla, Spain	10,000	Hard	(Portugal) Frederica Piedade	6–2, 6–4
Loss	3.	2 May 2004	ITF Taranto, Italy	25,000	Clay	(Germany) Martina Müller	3–6, 2–6
Win	3.	9 July 2006	ITF Mont-de-Marsan, France	25,000	Clay	(Romania) Raluca Olaru	6–4, 4–6, 6–0
Loss	4.	24 February 2008	ITF Portimão, Portugal	10,000	Hard	(Russia) Elena Chalova	4–6, 4–6
Win	4.	25 May 2008	ITF Moscow, Russia	25,000	Clay	(Russia) Ksenia Pervak	3–6, 6–1, 7–5
Win	5.	1 June 2008	ITF Tolyatti, Russia	25,000	Hard	(Austria) Patricia Mayr-Achleitner	6–3, 6–0
Loss	5.	22 February 2009	ITF Portimão, Portugal	10,000	Hard	(Spain) Sandra Soler-Sola	6–3, 2–6, 3–6
Win	6.	17 May 2009	ITF Vila Real de Santo; António, Portugal	10,000	Clay	(Spain) Irene Santos-Bravo	7–5, 2–6, 6–4
Loss	6.	25 October 2009	Lagos Open, Nigeria	25,000	Hard	(Slovakia) Zuzana Kučová	0–6, 6–7^{(7)}
Win	7.	18 April 2010	Soweto Open, South Africa	100,000	Hard	(Thailand) Tamarine Tanasugarn	7–5, 7–6^{(7)}
Win	8.	31 October 2010	Lagos Open, Nigeria	25,000	Hard	(Slovakia) Zuzana Kučová	7–5, 6–1
Loss	7.	26 December 2010	Pune Open, India	25,000	Hard	(Serbia) Bojana Jovanovski	4–6, 4–6
Win	9.	6 February 2011	ITF Rabat, Morocco	25,000	Clay	(Portugal) Maria Joao Koehler	3–6, 6–4, 6–1
Loss	8.	27 October 2013	Lagos Open, Nigeria	25,000	Hard	(Italy) Gioia Barbieri	6–3, 3–6, 0–3 ret.

=== Doubles: 61 (35–26) ===
Legend $100,000 tournaments $75,000 tournaments $50,000 tournaments $25,000 tournaments $10,000 tournaments	Finals by surface Hard (24–14) Clay (10–12) Carpet (1–0)

Result	No.	Date	Tournament	Tier	Surface	Partner	Opponents	Score
Win	1.	14 October 2001	ITF Catania, Italy	10,000	Clay	(Italy) Anna Floris	(Italy) Georgia Mortello (Italy) Lisa Tognetti	6–2, 5–7, 7–6^{(8)}
Loss	1.	15 April 2003	ITF Cavtat, Croatia	10,000	Clay	(Russia) Raissa Gourevitch	(Bosnia and Herzegovina) Mervana Jugić-Salkić (Croatia) Darija Jurak	6–2, 5–7, 7–6^{(8)}
Win	2.	29 November 2003	ITF Haifa, Israel	10,000	Hard	(Ukraine) Olena Antypina	(Ukraine) Veronika Kapshay (Hungary) Barbara Pócza	7–5, 6–4
Win	3.	6 December 2003	ITF Tel Aviv, Israel	10,000	Hard	(Ukraine) Olena Antypina	(Russia) Oksana Karyshkova (Belarus) Elena Yaryshka	6–1, 5–7, 6–3
Win	4.	1 March 2004	ITF Melilla, Spain	10,000	Hard	(Russia) Alla Kudryavtseva	(Russia) Anastasia Dvornikova (Belarus) Irena Nossenko	7–5, 6–3
Loss	2.	30 May 2004	ITF Tongliao, China	25,000	Hard	(Russia) Anna Bastrikova	(Latvia) Līga Dekmeijere (Turkey) İpek Şenoğlu	5–7, 6–7
Loss	3.	28 June 2004	ITF Mont-de-Marsan, France	25,000	Clay	(Portugal) Frederica Piedade	(Spain) Lourdes Domínguez Lino (Spain) Paula García	3–6, 6–3, 4–6
Loss	4.	9 August 2004	ITF Martina Franca, Italy	25,000	Clay	(Italy) Giulia Casoni	(France) Aurélie Védy (Germany) Jasmin Wöhr	1–6, 6–3, 6–7
Loss	5.	14 November 2004	ITF Barcelona, Spain	25,000	Clay	(Russia) Ekaterina Kozhokina	(Spain) Lourdes Domínguez Lino (Spain) Laura Pous Tió	4–6, 6–7
Win	5.	20 March 2005	Neva Cup, Russia	25,000	Hard (i)	(Russia) Ekaterina Makarova	(Russia) Alla Kudryavtseva (Russia) Ekaterina Kosminskaya	7–6^{(2)}, 6–2
Win	6.	11 April 2005	ITF Mumbai, India	25,000	Hard	(Italy) Francesca Lubiani	(India) Rushmi Chakravarthi (India) Sai Jayalakshmy Jayaram	6–3, 6–4
Loss	6.	12 June 2005	ITF Gorizia, Italy	25,000	Clay	(Ukraine) Olena Antypina	(Italy) Giulia Casoni (Italy) Valentina Sulpizio	2–6, 0–6
Loss	7.	18 July 2005	ITF Les Contamines, France	25,000	Clay	(Russia) Ekaterina Kosminskaya	(Belarus) Nadejda Ostrovskaya (Israel) Yevgenia Savranska	1–6, 6–2, 4–6
Win	7.	29 Aug 2005	ITF Balashikha, Russia	25,000	Clay	(Russia) Anna Bastrikova	(Russia) Ekaterina Lopes (Russia) Olga Panova	6–2, 6–2
Loss	8.	27 September 2005	Batumi Ladies Open, Georgia	50,000	Hard (i)	(Russia) Anna Bastrikova	(Belarus) Nadejda Ostrovskaya (Belarus) Anastasiya Yakimova	6–2, 2–6, 6–7^{(9)}
Loss	9.	21 November 2005	ITF Poitiers, France	75,000	Hard (i)	(Uzbekistan) Akgul Amanmuradova	(Estonia) Maret Ani (Bosnia and Herzegovina) Mervana Jugić-Salkić	6–7^{(0)}, 1–6
Win	8.	5 March 2006	ITF Las Palmas, Spain	25,000	Hard	(Russia) Alla Kudryavtseva	(Poland) Karolina Kosińska (Poland) Alicja Rosolska	6–1, 6–3
Win	9.	12 March 2006	ITF Telde, Spain	25,000	Clay	(Russia) Alla Kudryavtseva	(Italy) Sara Errani (Italy) Giulia Gabba	6–1, 6–1
Win	10.	11 April 2006	Open de Biarritz, France	25,000	Clay	(Kazakhstan) Yaroslava Shvedova	(Poland) Klaudia Jans (Poland) Alicja Rosolska	6–3, 6–2
Loss	10.	23 May 2006	Beijing Challenger, China	50,000	Hard (i)	(Latvia) Līga Dekmeijere	(Chinese Taipei) Chuang Chia-jung (Thailand) Tamarine Tanasugarn	6–4, 2–6, 3–6
Loss	11.	2 July 2006	ITF Périgueux, France	25,000	Clay	(Russia) Lioudmila Skavronskaia	(Australia) Monique Adamczak (Canada) Marie-Ève Pelletier	3–6, 4–6
Loss	12.	9 July 2006	ITF Mont-de-Marsan, France	25,000	Clay	(Uzbekistan) Akgul Amanmuradova	(Romania) Raluca Olaru (Georgia (country)) Margalita Chakhnashvili	5–7, 6–1, 1–6
Win	11.	22 July 2006	ITF Dnipropetrovsk, Ukraine	25,000	Clay	(Ukraine) Olena Antypina	(Russia) Evgeniya Rodina (Ukraine) Kristina Antoniychuk	6–1, 5–7, 7–5
Win	12.	18 February 2007	Biberach Open, Germany	25,000	Hard (i)	(Poland) Urszula Radwańska	(Croatia) Darija Jurak (Bosnia and Herzegovina) Sandra Martinović	6–2, 6–0
Win	13.	23 March 2007	ITF Mumbai, India	25,000	Hard	(Uzbekistan) Akgul Amanmuradova	(Russia) Olga Panova (Switzerland) Stefanie Vögele	6–2, 6–3
Loss	13.	5 June 2007	ITF Madrid, Spain	25,000	Clay	(Portugal) Neuza Silva	(Argentina) Jorgelina Cravero (Argentina) Betina Jozami	4–6, 4–6
Win	14.	9 July 2007	ITF Mont-de-Marsan, France	25,000	Clay	(Portugal) Neuza Silva	(Brazil) Joana Cortez (Brazil) Teliana Pereira	6–3, 7–6^{(3)}
Loss	14.	25 August 2007	ITF Moscow, Russia	25,000	Clay	(France) Sophie Lefèvre	(Russia) Maria Kondratieva (Serbia) Vesna Dolonc	6–2, 6–1
Loss	15.	28 October 2007	ITF Podolsk, Russia	25,000	Hard (i)	(Russia) Anastasia Poltoratskaya	(Russia) Vasilisa Davydova (Australia) Arina Rodionova	3–6, 0–6
Loss	16.	14 January 2008	ITF Stuttgart, Germany	10,000	Hard (i)	(Ukraine) Kateryna Herth	(Russia) Vasilisa Davydova (Russia) Elizaveta Tochilovskaya	2–6, 5–7
Win	15.	4 February 2008	ITF Algarve, Portugal	10,000	Hard	(Ukraine) Kateryna Herth	(Portugal) Neuza Silva (Netherlands) Danielle Harmsen	6–4, 6–3
Loss	17.	17 March 2008	Neva Cup, Russia	25,000	Hard (i)	(Russia) Vasilisa Davydova	(Czech Republic) Nikola Fraňková (Russia) Anastasia Pavlyuchenkova	2–6, 2–6
Win	16.	5 May 2008	ITF Jounieh Open, Lebanon	50,000	Clay	(Ukraine) Veronika Kapshay	(Slovakia) Kristína Kučová (Switzerland) Stefanie Vögele	7–5, 3–6, [10–6]
Win	17.	26 May 2008	ITF Tolyatti, Russia	25,000	Clay	(Russia) Vasilisa Davydova	(Czech Republic) Nikola Fraňková (Austria) Patricia Mayr-Achleitner	6–3, 5–7, [10–3]
Loss	18.	3 August 2008	ITF Vigo, Spain	25,000	Hard	(Portugal) Frederica Piedade	(Portugal) Neuza Silva (Netherlands) Nicole Thyssen	2–6, 4–6
Loss	19.	4 July 2009	ITF Pozoblanco, Spain	50,000	Hard	(Romania) Ágnes Szatmári	(Czech Republic) Andrea Hlaváčková (Ukraine) Olga Savchuk	3–6, 3–6
Loss	20.	1 August 2009	ITF Almaty, Kazakhstan	25,000	Hard	(Romania) Ágnes Szatmári	(Russia) Elena Chalova (Georgia (country)) Oksana Kalashnikova	1–6, 0–6
Loss	21.	8 August 2009	ITF Astana, Kazakhstan	25,000	Hard	(Romania) Ágnes Szatmári	(Ukraine) Yuliana Fedak (Belarus) Darya Kustova	4–6, 5–7
Win	18.	14 September 2009	ITF Napoli, Italy	25,000	Clay	(Georgia (country)) Oksana Kalashnikova	(Argentina) Betina Jozami (Argentina) María Irigoyen	7–6^{(5)}, 2–6, [10–8]
Win	19.	26 September 2009	ITF Madrid, Spain	25,000	Hard	(France) Irena Pavlovic	(France) Claire Feuerstein (France) Constance Sibille	6–2, 6–4
Win	20.	3 October 2009	ITF Granada, Spain	25,000	Hard	(Australia) Arina Rodionova	(Argentina) Betina Jozami (Russia) Valeria Savinykh	6–1, 3–6, [10–5]
Win	21.	16 October 2009	Lagos Open, Nigeria	25,000	Hard	(Greece) Anna Gerasimou	(Sweden) Anna Brazhnikova (Russia) Anastasia Mukhametova	7–6^{(3)}, 7–6^{(1)}
Win	22.	23 October 2009	Lagos Open, Nigeria	25,000	Hard	(Greece) Anna Gerasimou	(Israel) Chen Astrogo (Israel) Keren Shlomo	6–4, 7–5
Win	23.	31 October 2009	ITF Istanbul, Turkey	25,000	Hard (i)	(Kyrgyzstan) Ksenia Palkina	(Czech Republic) Petra Cetkovská (Czech Republic) Renata Voráčová	w/o
Loss	22.	16 November 2009	Pune Open, India	50,000	Hard	(Kyrgyzstan) Ksenia Palkina	(Ukraine) Anastasiya Vasylyeva (Italy) Nicole Clerico	6–4, 3–6, [11–13]
Win	24.	28 March 2010	ITF Moscow, Russia	25,000	Carpet (i)	(France) Irena Pavlovic	(Ukraine) Lyudmyla Kichenok (Ukraine) Nadiia Kichenok	6–7^{(4)}, 6–2, [10–3]
Win	25.	18 July 2010	Contrexéville Open, France	50,000	Clay	(Russia) Ekaterina Lopes	(Australia) Jelena Dokic (Canada) Sharon Fichman	6–4, 4–6, [10–3]
Win	26.	8 August 2010	Tatarstan Open, Kazakhstan	50,000	Hard	(Russia) Ekaterina Lopes	(Ukraine) Yuliana Fedak (Ukraine) Anastasiya Vasylyeva	6–4, 6–4
Win	27.	22 October 2010	Lagos Open, Nigeria	25,000	Hard	(Romania) Ágnes Szatmári	(Sweden) Anna Brazhnikova (Russia) Anastasia Mukhametova	6–4, 6–3
Loss	23.	29 October 2010	Lagos Open, Nigeria	25,000	Hard	(Romania) Ágnes Szatmári	(Austria) Melanie Klaffner (Poland) Karolina Kosińska	6–3, 5–7, [7–10]
Win	28.	26 December 2010	Pune Open, India	25,000	Hard	(Russia) Alexandra Panova	(Ukraine) Anna Shkudun (Japan) Sachie Ishizu	6–3, 7–6^{(2)}
Loss	24.	8 May 2011	ITF Bukhara, Uzbekistan	25,000	Hard	(Kyrgyzstan) Ksenia Palkina	(South Korea) Han Sung-hee (China) Liang Chen	6–4, 6–7^{(5)}, [5–10]
Win	29.	11 June 2011	Open de Marseille, France	100,000	Clay	(Romania) Irina-Camelia Begu	(Romania) Laura-Ioana Andrei (Romania) Mădălina Gojnea	6–2, 6–2
Win	30.	27 June 2011	ITF Pozoblanco, Spain	50,000	Clay	(France) Irena Pavlovic	(Russia) Marina Melnikova (Georgia (country)) Sofia Shapatava	6–2, 6–4
Win	31.	12 September 2011	Sofia Cup, Bulgaria	100,000	Clay	(Croatia) Darija Jurak	(Romania) Alexandra Cadanțu (Romania) Raluca Olaru	6–4, 7–5
Win	32.	19 September 2011	Open de Saint-Malo, France	100,000	Clay	(Croatia) Darija Jurak	(Sweden) Johanna Larsson (Germany) Jasmin Wöhr	6–4, 6–2
Win	33.	17 October 2011	Lagos Open, Nigeria	25,000	Hard	(Austria) Melanie Klaffner	(Slovenia) Tadeja Majerič (Bulgaria) Aleksandrina Naydenova	7–5, 5–7, [10–6]
Win	34.	28 November 2011	Dubai Tennis Challenge, United Arab Emirates	75,000	Hard	(Croatia) Darija Jurak	(Uzbekistan) Akgul Amanmuradova (Romania) Alexandra Dulgheru	6–4, 3–6, [10–6]
Win	35.	19 December 2011	Ankara Cup, Turkey	50,000	Hard (i)	(Croatia) Darija Jurak	(Slovakia) Janette Husárová (Hungary) Katalin Marosi	6–4, 6–2
Loss	25.	15 October 2012	Lagos Open, Nigeria	25,000	Hard	(Russia) Margarita Lazareva	(Switzerland) Conny Perrin (South Africa) Chanel Simmonds	1–6, 1–6
Loss	26.	22 July 2013	President's Cup, Kazakhstan	100,000	Hard	(Russia) Valeria Solovyeva	(Ukraine) Lyudmyla Kichenok (Ukraine) Nadiia Kichenok	2–6, 2–6
