= Julia Glushko =

Israeli tennis player (born 1990)

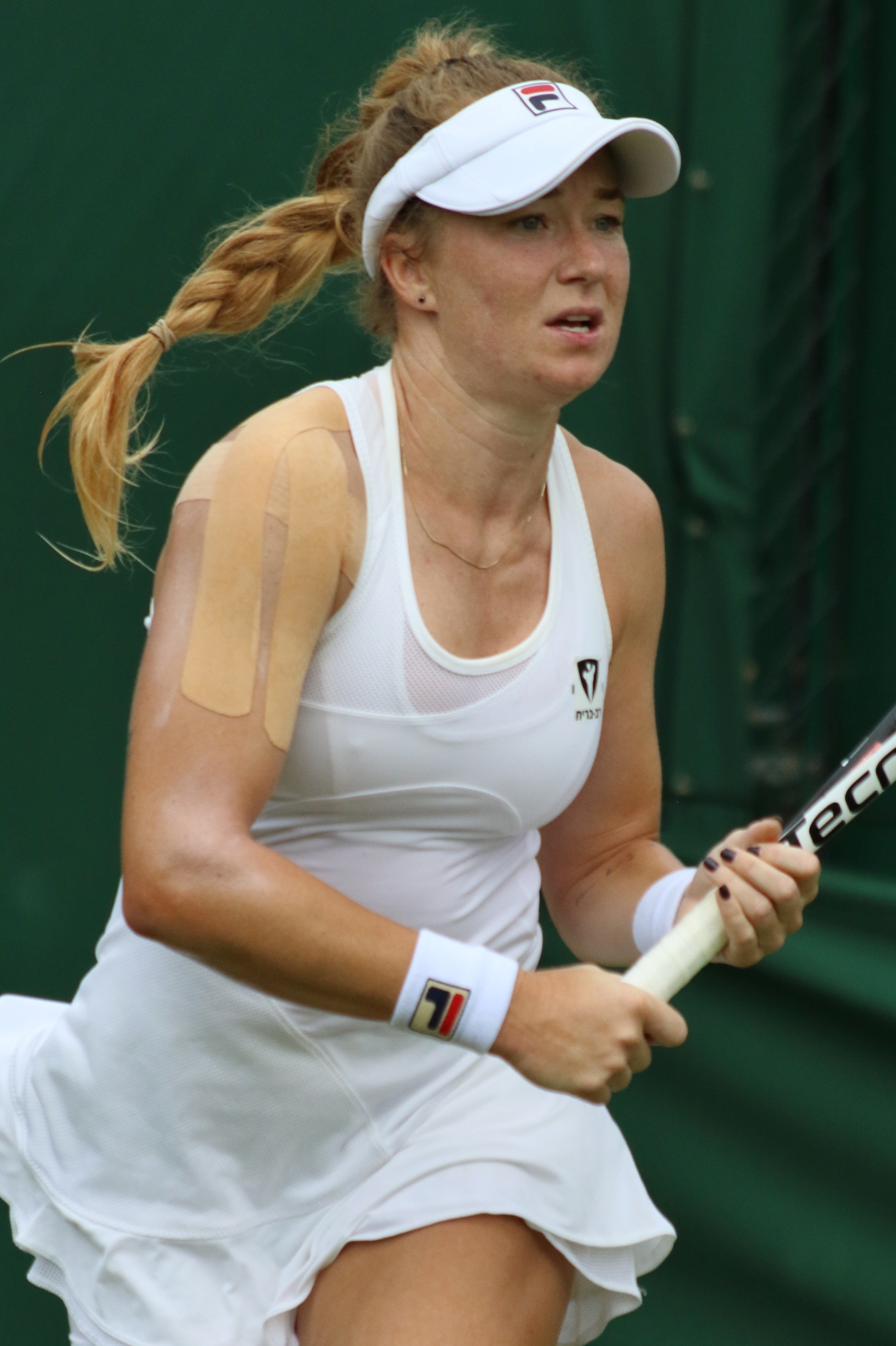
- Glushko, 2019 at Wimbledon
- Native name: יוליה גלושקו
- Country (sports): Israel
- Residence: Modi'in, Israel
- Born: 1 January 1990 (age 36) Donetsk, Ukrainian SSR, USSR
- Height: 1.71 m (5 ft 7 in)
- Turned pro: 2005
- Retired: 2019
- Plays: Right-handed (two-handed backhand)
- Prize money: $998,044

Singles
- Career record: 388–320
- Career titles: 11 ITF
- Highest ranking: No. 79 (23 June 2014)

Grand Slam singles results
- Australian Open: 1R (2014)
- French Open: 3R (2014)
- Wimbledon: 1R (2014)
- US Open: 3R (2013)

Doubles
- Career record: 182–165
- Career titles: 14 ITF
- Highest ranking: No. 109 (4 November 2013)

Grand Slam doubles results
- Wimbledon: Q1 (2013)

Team competitions
- Fed Cup: 29–29

Julia Glushko (or Yulia, Hebrew: יוליה גלושקו; born 1 January 1990) is an Israeli former tennis player.

She won 11 singles and 14 doubles titles on the ITF Women's Circuit. Her best results at a Grand Slam tournament were reaching the third round of the US Open in 2013, and the French Open in 2014 in singles. In September 2015, she reached the final of the WTA 125 event in Dalian, where she was defeated by Zheng Saisai.

On 23 June 2014, Glushko reached her best singles ranking of world No. 79. On 4 November 2013, she peaked at No. 109 in the doubles rankings. She won the 2011 Israeli National Women's Singles Championship. Playing for Israel in the Fed Cup, she had a win–loss record of 29–29.

== Early and personal life ==
Glushko was born in Donetsk, Ukrainian SSR, USSR, and is fluent in Hebrew, Russian, and English. She started playing tennis at the age of four. Her parents, Sergei and Olga, are tennis instructors. Glushko and her family immigrated to Israel from Ukraine when she was nine years old, initially living in the Katamon neighborhood of the city of Jerusalem for three years, and then in the city of Ramat HaSharon. She then trained at the Wingate Institute in Netanya. She served in the Israel Defense Forces for over two years. She lives in Modi'in, halfway between Jerusalem and Tel Aviv, Israel. Her younger sister Lina Glushko is also a tennis player with whom she has teamed as a doubles partner.

== Tennis career ==
=== Junior years ===
Glushko won four junior titles. The first three were the 2006 Saadia Rees (Grade 4), the 2007 Argentina Cup (Grade 2), and the 2007 Uruguay Bowl (Grade 2).

In March 2007, she won the Grade-1 Asunción Bowl junior girls tournament in Paraguay. It was the first Grade-1 title of Glushko's career. At 17 years of age she was ranked 10th in the world junior tennis rankings.

At the US Open in September 2007, Glushko won her first two junior singles matches, and her first-round junior doubles match with Tyra Calderwood.

=== Professional ===
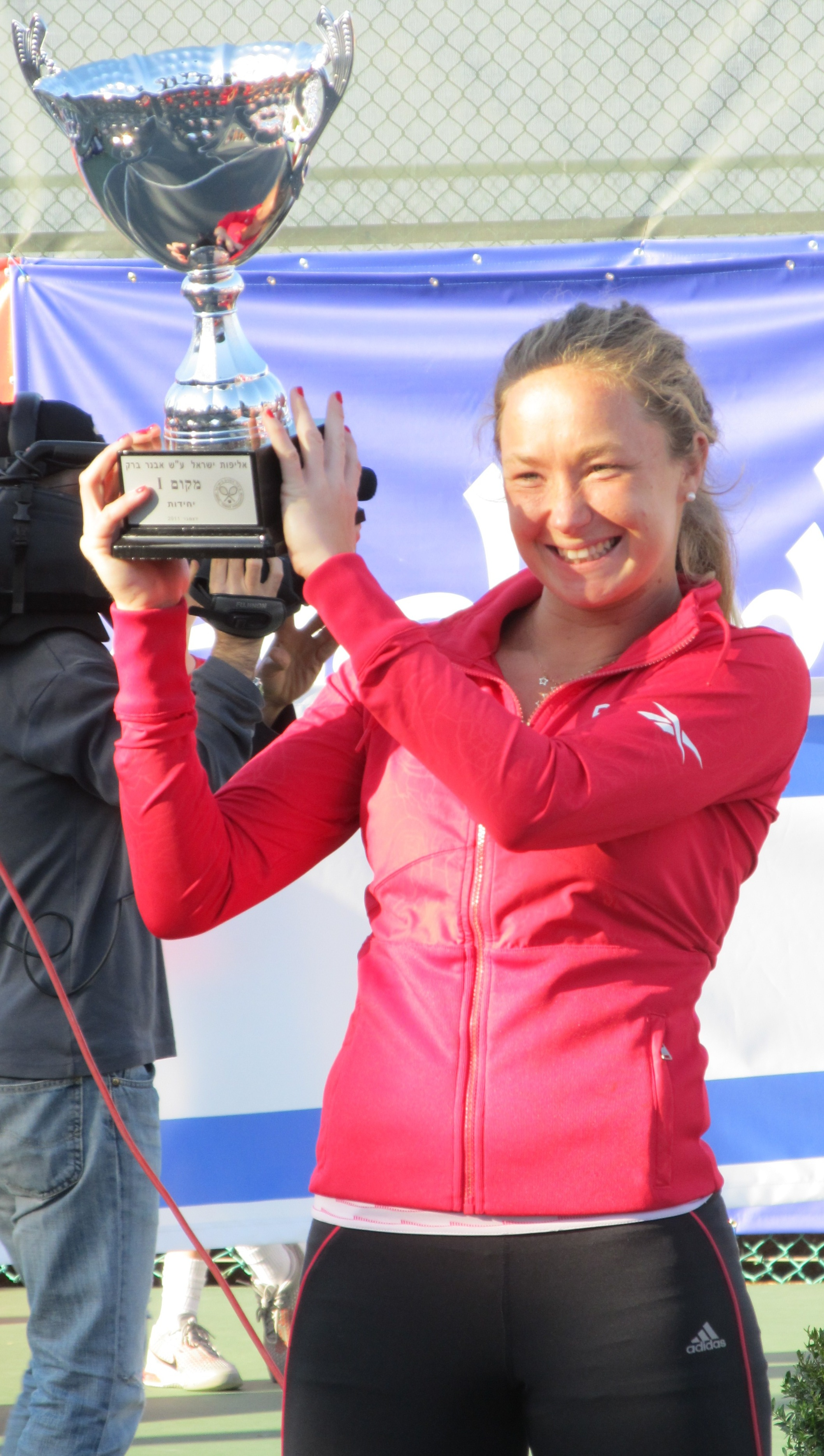
Glushko in 2011

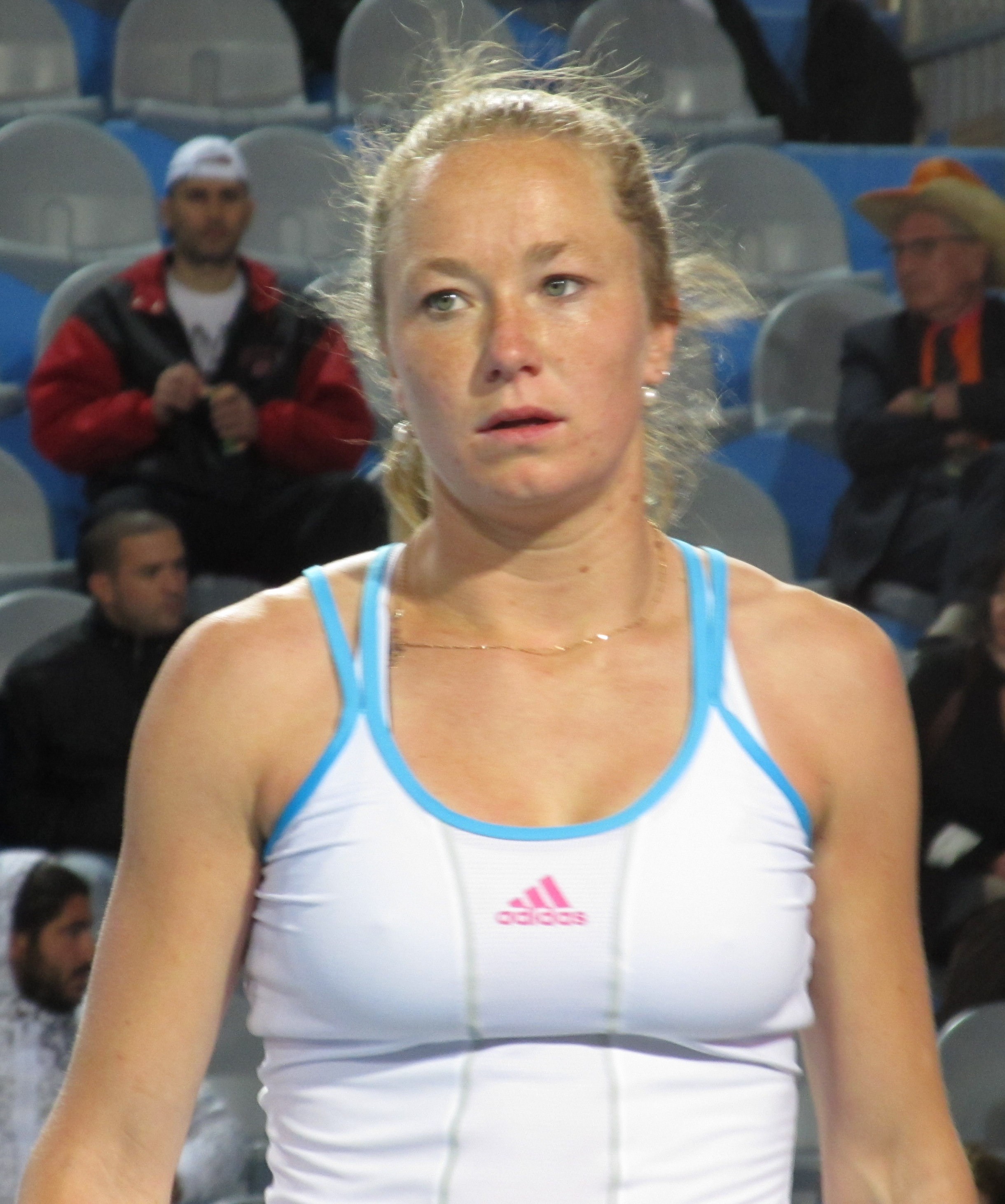
Glushko in 2012

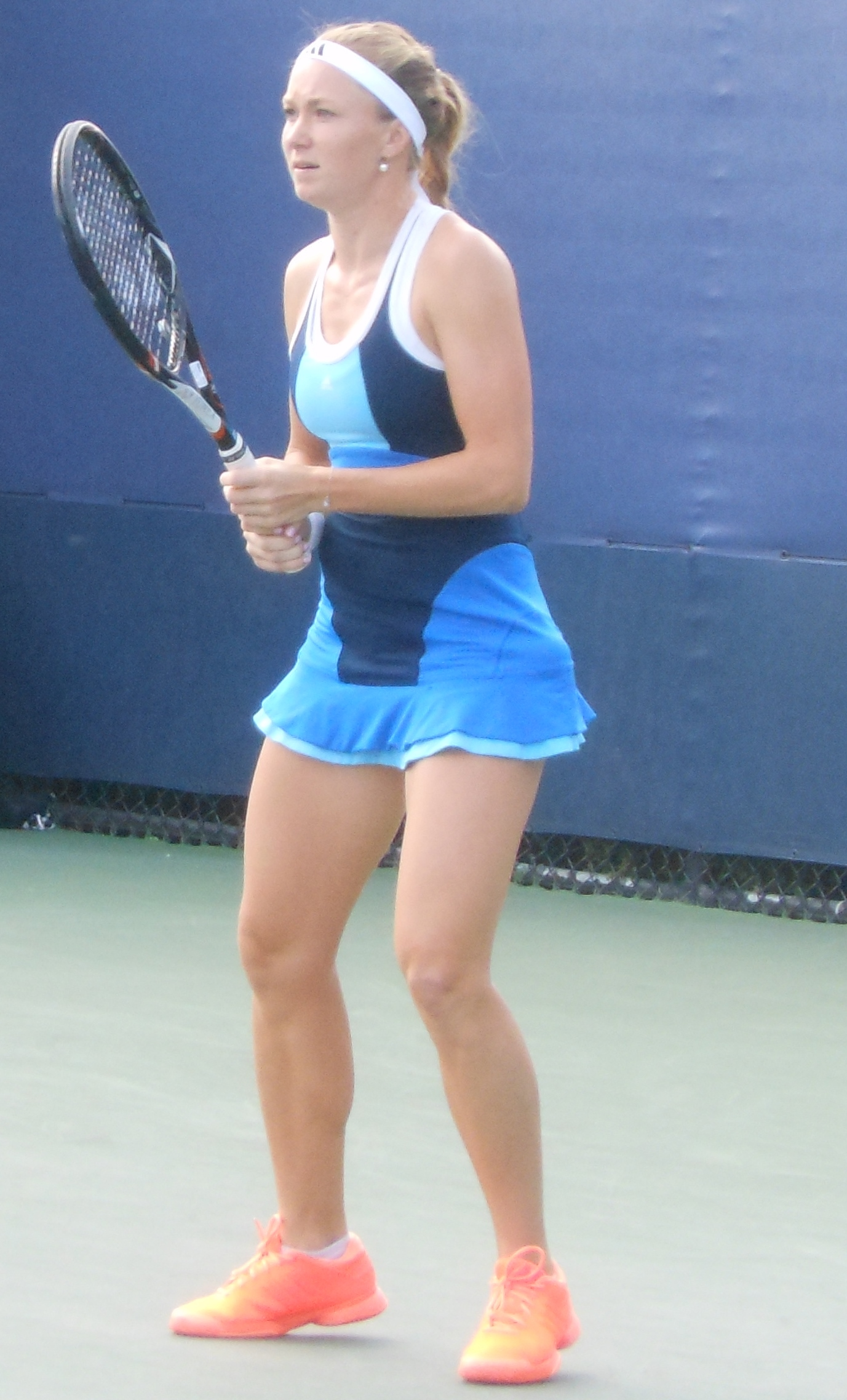
Glushko at the 2013 US Open

Glushko made her professional debut in March 2004 at an ITF event in Ramat HaSharon. She beat Diana Voskoboynik (Israel) in the first round of qualifying, before losing to Yakaterina Burduli.

Her best result on the professional level to that point was a semifinal appearance at an ITF event in Antalya in May 2006, where Glushko lost to Çağla Büyükakçay.

In November 2007, Glushko won her first ITF title an event in Mallorca, beating Diana Enache in the final.

In 2008, she won three ITF titles in doubles competitions with different partners. Glushko celebrated her maiden title at Albufeira, Portugal, alongside Marina Melnikova in February, beating Martina Babáková and Elena Chalova in the final, followed by the victory at Porto Rafti, Greece, with Dominice Ripoll in March, and a third tournament win in May at Ra'anana, where Glushko teamed up with Manana Shapakidze.

In November 2010, she defeated top-seeded world No. 42, Jarmila Wolfe, at the $25k event in Traralgon, Australia, which she won.

In December 2010, Glushko lost the final of the Israeli championships to Shahar Pe'er, in three sets.

In January 2011, she played her first Grand Slam qualifying match, for the Australian Open, reaching the second round after losing to Nuria Llagostera Vives.

Glushko beat Shahar Pe'er in the women's final of the 2011 Israel National Championships.

In 2012, Glushko made her Grand Slam main-draw debut at the US Open, after she defeated Zheng Saisai in the qualifying competition. She lost in the first round to Yanina Wickmayer in straight sets.

In May 2013, Glushko played her second Grand Slam event, the French Open, after she defeated Anastasia Rodionova from Australia in the qualifying competition. Again, she lost in the first round, this time to María Teresa Torró Flor.

In August 2013, Glushko played in Rogers Cup qualifying and defeated Christina McHale in the first round. In the second round of qualifying, she defeated Gabriela Dabrowski in straight sets and entered her first Premier tournament. She played at the 2013 US Open and, after qualifying to the main draw, beat 20th-seeded world No. 23, Nadia Petrova. In the second round, she defeated Sachia Vickery, but lost to Daniela Hantuchová in a third-set tiebreaker in round three.

In September 2013, Glushko won her first WTA Tour main-draw match defeating Tetyana Arefyeva. In the second round, she lost to Galina Voskoboeva.

In May 2014, she lost in the first round of Nürnberger Versicherungscup to Caroline Garcia, after qualifying to the main draw. Glushko played at the French Open and beat Donna Vekić in the first round. In the second round, she defeated world No. 22, Kirsten Flipkens, in three sets. However, her run came to an end when she was beaten by Sara Errani, winning only one game.

In June 2014, Glushko lost in the first round of Wimbledon to Sabine Lisicki, 2–6, 1–6 on the Centre Court. In September 2015, she reached the final of the WTA 125 event in Dalian, where she was defeated by Zheng Saisai.

In August 2014, she defeated world No. 32, Bojana Jovanovski, at the Western & Southern Open in Cincinnati.

In 2017, the Women’s Tennis Association deleted reference to Glushko's nationality and Israeli flag from her profile on their website ahead of her scheduled participation at the Malaysian Open in Kuala Lumpur, when event organizers requested all references to her being Israeli be removed from the WTA website in order for her to be allowed to take part in the event. The WTA subsequently reinstated them.

On 29 July 2018, she won the $60k singles title at Granby, Canada, defeating top-seeded Arina Rodionova of Australia in the final.

At the 2018 US Open, Glushko hurt her left knee during play, but had it taped and won her match against Monica Niculescu. She then lost to Naomi Osaka as she played taped calf to quad and hobbled, and learned, however, that she had a fracture in her left knee, and once it healed she had surgery to clean the meniscus.

She played her final professional tournament in Israel in September 2019, when she lost in the first round singles, and quarterfinals with doubles partner, sister Lina Glushko. On 24 December 2019, she retired from competitive tennis at 29 years of age.

=== Fed Cup ===
Playing for Israel in the Fed Cup, Glushko's record was 29-29.

Glushko made her debut with the Israel Fed Cup team on 22 April 2007, in Kamloops, Canada. She lost in straight sets to Marie-Ève Pelletier, after Israel had already clinched the match 3–2. In July, she played Melanie Klaffner in another dead rubber, with Israel defeating Austria 4–1.

At the 2011 Fed Cup held in Eilat, Glushko won three out of her four singles rubbers – against Anne Kremer of Luxembourg, Magda Linette of Poland, and Elitsa Kostova of Bulgaria; she lost to Monica Niculescu of Romania. Glushko also won two out of three doubles matches together with Shahar Pe'er – against Luxembourg and Romania. Israel lost to Poland.

At the 2012 Fed Cup, she won one out of her three singles rubbers, and she won one out of her two doubles games with Shahar Pe'er. She defeated Maria João Koehler and lost to Bibiane Schoofs and Anne Keothavong. In doubles, she and Pe'er lost to Koehler and Michelle Larcher de Brito from Portugal, but defeated Schoofs and Michaëlla Krajicek from the Netherlands.

At the 2013 Fed Cup, Glushko won all four of her singles rubbers, but won neither of her two doubles games with Pe'er.

=== Maccabiah Games ===
Competing at the 2005 Maccabiah Games, Glushko lost to Sharon Fichman of Canada in the semifinals.

== WTA Challenger finals ==
=== Singles: 1 (runner-up) ===
Result	W–L	Date	Tournament	Surface	Opponent	Score
Loss	0–1	Sep 2015	Dalian Open, China	Hard	(China) Zheng Saisai	6–2, 1–6, 5–7

=== Doubles: 2 (2 runner-ups) ===
Result	W–L	Date	Tournament	Surface	Partner	Opponents	Score
Loss	0–1	Nov 2012	Royal Indian Open, India	Hard	(Thailand) Noppawan Lertcheewakarn	(Russia) Nina Bratchikova (Georgia (country)) Oksana Kalashnikova	0–6, 6–4, [6–10]
Loss	0–2	Apr 2017	Zhengzhou Open, China	Hard	(United States) Jacqueline Cako	(China) Han Xinyun (China) Zhu Lin	5–7, 1–6

== ITF Circuit finals ==
=== Singles: 15 (11 titles, 4 runner-ups) ===
Legend
$50/60,000 tournaments
$25,000 tournaments
$10,000 tournaments

Result	W–L	Date	Tournament	Tier	Surface	Opponent	Score
Win	1–0	Nov 2007	ITF Mallorca, Spain	10,000	Clay	(Romania) Diana Buzean	6–0, 6–0
Win	2–0	May 2010	ITF Ra'anana, Israel	10,000	Hard	(Israel) Keren Shlomo	6–1, 6–3
Win	3–0	Oct 2010	ITF Akko, Israel	10,000	Hard	(Germany) Julia Kimmelmann	6–2, 6–2
Win	4–0	Nov 2010	ITF Kalgoorlie, Australia	25,000	Hard	(Australia) Isabella Holland	6–1, 6–2
Win	5–0	Nov 2010	ITF Traralgon, Australia	25,000	Hard	(New Zealand) Sacha Jones	2–6, 7–5, 7–6^{(7–4)}
Loss	5–1	Jul 2012	Waterloo Challenger, Canada	50,000	Clay	(Canada) Sharon Fichman	3–6, 2–6
Win	6–1	Jul 2012	Lexington Challenger, United States	50,000	Hard	(United Kingdom) Johanna Konta	6–3, 6–0
Win	7–1	Mar 2013	Innisbrook Open, United States	25,000	Clay	(Austria) Patricia Mayr-Achleitner	2–6, 6–0, 6–4
Win	8–1	Jul 2013	ITF Waterloo, Canada	50,000	Clay	(Canada) Gabriela Dabrowski	6–1, 6–3
Win	9–1	Jun 2018	ITF Hua Hin, Thailand	25,000	Hard	(Australia) Alexandra Bozovic	6–2, 6–2
Loss	9–2	Jun 2018	ITF Hua Hin, Thailand	25,000	Hard	(Mexico) Victoria Rodríguez	4–6, 1–6
Win	10–2	Jun 2018	ITF Singapore	25,000	Hard	(Japan) Risa Ozaki	1–6, 6–1, 6–4
Loss	10–3	Jul 2018	ITF Winnipeg, Canada	25,000	Hard	(Canada) Rebecca Marino	6–7^{(3–7)}, 6–7^{(4–7)}
Win	11–3	Jul 2018	Challenger de Granby, Canada	60,000	Hard	(Australia) Arina Rodionova	6–4, 6–3
Loss	11–4	Jun 2019	ITF Akko, Israel	25,000	Hard	(Switzerland) Susan Bandecchi	4–6, 2–6

=== Doubles: 32 (14–18) ===
Legend
$100,000 tournaments
$75/80,000 tournaments
$50/60,000 tournaments
$25,000 tournaments
$10,000 tournaments

Outcome	No.	Date	Tournament	Surface	Partner	Opponents	Score
Runner-up	1.	11 November 2007	ITF Mallorca, Spain	Clay	(France) Charlene Vanneste	(Russia) Marina Melnikova (Poland) Sylwia Zagórska	4–6, 4–6
Runner-up	2.	24 November 2007	ITF Ramat HaSharon, Israel	Hard	(Israel) Keren Shlomo	(Belarus) Iryna Kurianovic (Slovenia) Mika Urbančič	4–6, 1–6
Winner	1.	17 February 2008	ITF Albufeira, Portugal	Hard	(Russia) Marina Melnikova	(Slovakia) Martina Babáková (Russia) Elena Chalova	6–3, 0–6, [11–9]
Winner	2.	23 March 2008	ITF Porto Rafti, Greece	Hard	(Germany) Dominice Ripoll	(Italy) Nicole Clerico (Slovenia) Mika Urbančič	1–6, 7–5, [10–7]
Winner	3.	24 May 2008	ITF Ra'anana, Israel	Hard	(Georgia (country)) Manana Shapakidze	(Israel) Chen Astrogo (Netherlands) Marcella Koek	7–5, 6–7^{(5–7)}, [10–6]
Runner-up	3.	14 September 2008	ITF Sarajevo, Bosnia and Herzegovina	Clay	(Turkey) Çağla Büyükakçay	(Italy) Alberta Brianti (Slovenia) Polona Hercog	4–6, 5–7
Winner	4.	29 May 2010	ITF Ra'anana, Israel	Hard	(Israel) Keren Shlomo	(Israel) Efrat Mishor (Russia) Anna Rapoport	3–6, 7–6^{(8–6)}, [10–3]
Runner-up	4.	26 June 2010	ITF Kristinehamn, Sweden	Clay	(Turkey) Pemra Özgen	(Bosnia and Herzegovina) Mervana Jugić-Salkić (Finland) Emma Laine	2–6, 3–6
Winner	5.	18 July 2010	ITF Atlanta, United States	Hard	(United States) Kristy Frilling	(United States) Irina Falconi (United States) Maria Sanchez	6–2, 2–6, [10–7]
Winner	6.	23 October 2010	ITF Akko, Israel	Hard	(Austria) Janina Toljan	(Belgium) Gally De Wael (Czech Republic) Zuzana Linhová	6–2, 6–2
Runner-up	5.	29 October 2011	ITF Netanya, Israel	Hard	(Italy) Nicole Clerico	(Turkey) Çağla Büyükakçay (Turkey) Pemra Özgen	5–7, 3–6
Runner-up	6.	29 April 2012	Charlottesville Classic, United States	Clay	(Russia) Elena Bovina	(United States) Maria Sanchez (United States) Yasmin Schnack	2–6, 2–6
Runner-up	7.	18 May 2012	Open Saint-Gaudens, France	Clay	(United Kingdom) Naomi Broady	(Serbia) Vesna Dolonc (Russia) Irina Khromacheva	2–6, 0–6
Runner-up	8.	29 July 2012	Lexington Challenger, United States	Hard	(Australia) Olivia Rogowska	(Japan) Shuko Aoyama (China) Xu Yifan	5–7, 7–6^{(7–4)}, [4–10]
Winner	7.	5 August 2012	Vancouver Open, Canada	Hard	(Australia) Olivia Rogowska	(United States) Jacqueline Cako (United States) Natalie Pluskota	6–4, 5–7, [10–7]
Winner	8.	18 May 2013	Open Saint-Gaudens, France	Clay	(Argentina) Paula Ormaechea	(Canada) Stéphanie Dubois (Japan) Kurumi Nara	7–5, 7–6^{(13–11)}
Runner-up	9.	15 June 2013	Nottingham Open, UK	Grass	(Japan) Erika Sema	(France) Julie Coin (France) Stéphanie Foretz Gacon	2–6, 4–6
Runner-up	10.	27 July 2013	Lexington Challenger, United States	Hard	(South Africa) Chanel Simmonds	(Thailand) Nicha Lertpitaksinchai (Thailand) Peangtarn Plipuech	6–7^{(4–7)}, 3–6
Runner-up	11.	4 May 2014	ITF Wiesbaden, Germany	Clay	(Luxembourg) Mandy Minella	(Switzerland) Viktorija Golubic (Latvia) Diāna Marcinkēviča	4–6, 3–6
Runner-up	12.	12 April 2015	Open Medellín, Colombia	Clay	(Colombia) Mariana Duque	(Spain) Lourdes Domínguez Lino (Luxembourg) Mandy Minella	5–7, 6–4, [5–10]
Winner	9.	15 May 2015	Open Saint-Gaudens, France	Clay	(Colombia) Mariana Duque	(Brazil) Beatriz Haddad Maia (United States) Nicole Melichar	1–6, 7–6^{(7–5)}, [10–4]
Runner-up	13.	7 November 2015	Waco Showdown, United States	Hard	(Sweden) Rebecca Peterson	(United States) Vania King (United States) Nicole Gibbs	4–6, 4–6
Winner	10.	15 November 2015	Scottsdale Challenge, United States	Hard	(Sweden) Rebecca Peterson	(Switzerland) Viktorija Golubic (Liechtenstein) Stephanie Vogt	4–6, 7–5, [10–6]
Winner	11.	8 May 2016	Indian Harbour Beach, United States	Clay	(Russia) Alexandra Panova	(United States) Jessica Pegula (United States) Maria Sanchez	7–5, 6–4
Runner-up	14.	6 August 2016	Challenger de Granby, Canada	Hard	(Belarus) Olga Govortsova	(United States) Jamie Loeb (Belgium) An-Sophie Mestach	4–6, 4–6
Runner-up	15.	1 October 2016	Brisbane QTC International, Australia	Hard	(China) Liu Fangzhou	(Australia) Naiktha Bains (Papua New Guinea) Abigail Tere-Apisah	7–6^{(7–4)}, 2–6, [3–10]
Winner	12.	1 April 2017	ITF Mornington, Australia	Clay	(Czech Republic) Barbora Krejčíková	(Australia) Jessica Moore (Thailand) Varatchaya Wongteanchai	6–4, 2–6, [11–9]
Runner-up	16.	6 May 2017	Kangaroo Cup Gifu, Japan	Hard	(United Kingdom) Katy Dunne	(Japan) Eri Hozumi (Japan) Miyu Kato	4–6, 2–6
Winner	13.	3 June 2017	Grado Tennis Cup, Italy	Clay	(Australia) Priscilla Hon	(Croatia) Tereza Mrdeža (Switzerland) Conny Perrin	7–5, 6–2
Winner	14.	10 June 2017	Internazionali di Brescia, Italy	Clay	(Australia) Priscilla Hon	(Paraguay) Montserrat González (Belarus) Ilona Kremen	2–6, 7–6^{(7–4)}, [10–8]
Runner-up	17.	16 June 2017	Barcelona Women World Winner, Spain	Clay	(Australia) Priscilla Hon	(Paraguay) Montserrat González (Spain) Sílvia Soler Espinosa	4–6, 3–6
Runner-up	18.	14 July 2018	ITF Winnipeg, Canada	Hard	(United States) Sanaz Marand	(Japan) Akiko Omae (Mexico) Victoria Rodríguez	6–7^{(2–7)}, 3–6

== Grand Slam singles performance timeline ==
Key
W	F	SF	QF	#R	RR	Q#	DNQ	A	NH

(W) winner; (F) finalist; (SF) semifinalist; (QF) quarterfinalist; (#R) rounds 4, 3, 2, 1; (RR) round-robin stage; (Q#) qualification round; (DNQ) did not qualify; (A) absent; (NH) not held; (SR) strike rate (events won / competed); (W–L) win–loss record.

Tournament	2011	2012	2013	2014	2015	2016	2017	2018	2019	W–L
Australian Open	Q2	Q2	Q2	1R	Q2	Q3	Q2	A	A	0–1
French Open	Q1	A	1R	3R	Q1	Q2	A	A	Q3	2–2
Wimbledon	Q1	A	Q3	1R	Q1	Q1	A	A	Q1	0–1
US Open	Q3	1R	3R	1R	Q2	Q2	A	2R	Q1	3–4

== See also ==
- List of select Jewish tennis players
