= 2023 Shenzhen Longhua Open – Men's singles =

Men's singles
- 2023 Shenzhen Longhua Open

Final
- Champion: (United States) Aleksandar Kovacevic
- Runner-up: (Portugal) Nuno Borges
- Score: 7–6^{(7–4)}, 7–6^{(7–5)}

Events
Singles	men	women
Doubles	men	women
← 2019 ·	Shenzhen Longhua Open	· 2024 →

Zhang Zhizhen was the defending champion but chose not to defend his title.

Aleksandar Kovacevic won the title after defeating Nuno Borges 7–6^{(7–4)}, 7–6^{(7–5)} in the final.

== Seeds ==
1. (Australia) Thanasi Kokkinakis (second round)
2. (Argentina) Pedro Cachin (semifinals)
3. (Portugal) Nuno Borges (final)
4. (Italy) Fabio Fognini (first round)
5. (Australia) James Duckworth (second round)
6. (United States) Aleksandar Kovacevic (champion)
7. (France) Térence Atmane (second round)
8. (Chinese Taipei) Hsu Yu-hsiou (quarterfinals)

== Draw ==
Key

- Q = Qualifier
- WC = Wild card
- LL = Lucky loser
- Alt = Alternate
- ITF = ITF entry
- PR = Protected ranking
- SR = Special ranking
- SE = Special exempt
- JE = Junior exempt
- JR = Junior Accelerator Programme entrant
- CO = College Accelerator Programme entrant
- NG = Next Gen Accelerator Program entrant
- w/o = Walkover
- r = Retired
- d = Defaulted

=== Finals ===
Semifinals
Q	Egor Gerasimov	2	1
3	(Portugal) Nuno Borges	6	6
6	(United States) Aleksandar Kovacevic	6	7^{9}
2	(Argentina) Pedro Cachin	4	6^{7}

Final
3	(Portugal) Nuno Borges	6^{4}	6^{5}
6	(United States) Aleksandar Kovacevic	7^{7}	7^{7}

=== Top half ===
First round
1	(Australia) T Kokkinakis	6	3	6
Q	(Northern Mariana Islands) C Sinclair	2	6	3
(Kazakhstan) B Zhukayev	6	6
Q	(China) Z Li	4	4
(Australia) L Tu	6	4	4
Q	E Gerasimov	4	6	6
(Italy) L Giustino	6^{4}	3
7	(France) T Atmane	7^{7}	6
3	(Portugal) N Borges	7	6
(Canada) S Diez	5	2
(China) Y Bu	3	6	2
(Australia) J McCabe	6	3	0^{r}
(Australia) L Saville	2	5
(Chinese Taipei) C-h Tseng	6	7
Q	(China) R Te	2	1
8	(Chinese Taipei) Y-h Hsu	6	6

Second round
1	(Australia) T Kokkinakis	3	4
(Kazakhstan) B Zhukayev	6	6
Q	E Gerasimov	7^{7}	6
7	(France) T Atmane	6^{4}	3
3	(Portugal) N Borges	6	6
(China) Y Bu	3	4
(Chinese Taipei) C-h Tseng	3	4
8	(Chinese Taipei) Y-h Hsu	6	6

Quarterfinals
(Kazakhstan) B Zhukayev	7^{7}	2	3
Q	E Gerasimov	6^{4}	6	6
3	(Portugal) N Borges	7^{7}	6
8	(Chinese Taipei) Y-h Hsu	6^{0}	0

Semifinals
Q	E Gerasimov	2	1
3	(Portugal) N Borges	6	6

=== Bottom half ===
First round
6	(United States) A Kovacevic	6	6
(Australia) P Sekulic	1	4
WC	(China) S Tang	3	4
A Kachmazov	6	6
WC	(China) Sun Qian	3	3
Q	(China) J Cui	6	6
(Kazakhstan) D Yevseyev	6	7^{8}
4/WC	(Italy) F Fognini	4	6^{6}
5	(Australia) J Duckworth	6	7^{7}
(Japan) K Uchida	0	6^{2}
(Chinese Taipei) J Jung	6	2	6
E Donskoy	4	6	4
(Czech Republic) D Palán	4	6^{4}
(Chinese Taipei) T-l Wu	6	7^{7}
Q	(China) Y Bai	4	3
2	(Argentina) P Cachin	6	6

Second round
6	(United States) A Kovacevic	6	6
A Kachmazov	1	4
Q	(China) J Cui	4	0
(Kazakhstan) D Yevseyev	6	6
5	(Australia) J Duckworth	6	5	2
(Chinese Taipei) J Jung	3	7	6
(Chinese Taipei) T-l Wu	6^{5}	7^{7}	6^{6}
2	(Argentina) P Cachin	7^{7}	6^{3}	7^{8}

Quarterfinals
6	(United States) A Kovacevic	6	6
(Kazakhstan) D Yevseyev	2	4
(Chinese Taipei) J Jung	3	4
2	(Argentina) P Cachin	6	6

Semifinals
6	(United States) A Kovacevic	6	7^{9}
2	(Argentina) P Cachin	4	6^{7}
