= 2017 Shenzhen Open – Doubles =

2017 Shenzhen Open – Doubles may refer to:

- 2017 ATP Shenzhen Open – Doubles
- 2017 WTA Shenzhen Open – Doubles
- 2017 Shenzhen Longhua Open – Men's Doubles
- 2017 Shenzhen Longhua Open – Women's Doubles

== See also ==
- 2017 Shenzhen Open (disambiguation)
- 2017 Shenzhen Longhua Open
