= 2017 Shenzhen Open – Singles =

2017 Shenzhen Open – Singles may refer to:

- 2017 ATP Shenzhen Open – Singles
- 2017 WTA Shenzhen Open – Singles
- 2017 Shenzhen Longhua Open – Men's Singles
- 2017 Shenzhen Longhua Open – Women's Singles

== See also ==
- 2017 Shenzhen Open (disambiguation)
- 2017 Shenzhen Longhua Open
