= 2024 Shenzhen Longhua Open – Doubles =

Doubles
- 2024 Shenzhen Longhua Open

Final
- Champions: (Thailand) Pruchya Isaro (China) Wang Aoran
- Runners-up: (Chinese Taipei) Ray Ho (United Kingdom) Joshua Paris
- Score: 7–6^{(7–4)}, 6–3

Events
Singles	Doubles
← 2023 ·	Shenzhen Longhua Open	· 2025 →

Alexander Erler and Lucas Miedler were the defending champions but chose not to defend their title.

Pruchya Isaro and Wang Aoran won the title after defeating Ray Ho and Joshua Paris 7–6^{(7–4)}, 6–3 in the final.

== Seeds ==
1. (Japan) Toshihide Matsui / (India) Ramkumar Ramanathan (first round)
2. (Chinese Taipei) Ray Ho / (United Kingdom) Joshua Paris (final)
3. (Japan) Kaichi Uchida / (Japan) Kaito Uesugi (quarterfinals)
4. (Australia) Thomas Fancutt / (Japan) Yuta Shimizu (first round)

== Draw ==
Key

- Q = Qualifier
- WC = Wild card
- LL = Lucky loser
- Alt = Alternate
- ITF = ITF entry
- PR = Protected ranking
- SR = Special ranking
- SE = Special exempt
- JE = Junior exempt
- JR = Junior Accelerator Programme entrant
- CO = College Accelerator Programme entrant
- NG = Next Gen Accelerator Program entrant
- w/o = Walkover
- r = Retired
- d = Defaulted

=== Draw ===
First round
1	(Japan) T Matsui (India) R Ramanathan	2	2
(Thailand) P Isaro (China) A Wang	6	6
Alt	P Bar Biryukov (Georgia (country)) S Purtseladze	5	6	[10]
(China) Y Bai (China) J Cui	7	4	[7]
3	(Japan) K Uchida (Japan) K Uesugi	6	6
(Australia) B Bayldon (Japan) S Watanabe	3	3
WC	(China) Yang Zijiang (China) Zeng Yaojie	6^{4}	6^{4}
(India) Sai Karteek Reddy Ganta (Japan) R Noguchi	7^{7}	7^{7}
WC	Mikalai Haliak (China) Xiao Linang	2	2
(Chinese Taipei) T-h Huang (South Africa) Kris van Wyk	6	6
(China) F Sun (China) R Te	7^{7}	6^{6}	[10]
4	(Australia) T Fancutt (Japan) Y Shimizu	6^{1}	7^{8}	[5]
Alt	(Japan) Tomohiro Masabayashi (Japan) Ryuki Matsuda	3	6	[7]
(Kazakhstan) G Lomakin (Ukraine) Vadym Ursu	6	3	[10]
(New Zealand) F Reynolds (New Zealand) R Statham	4	3
2	(Chinese Taipei) R Ho (United Kingdom) J Paris	6	6

Quarterfinals
(Thailand) P Isaro (China) A Wang	1	6	[10]
Alt	P Bar Biryukov (Georgia (country)) S Purtseladze	6	3	[5]
3	(Japan) K Uchida (Japan) K Uesugi	7^{7}	4	[9]
(India) SKR Ganta (Japan) R Noguchi	6^{3}	6	[11]
(Chinese Taipei) T-h Huang (South Africa) K van Wyk	6	6
(China) F Sun (China) R Te	4	2
(Kazakhstan) G Lomakin (Ukraine) V Ursu	3	2
2	(Chinese Taipei) R Ho (United Kingdom) J Paris	6	6

Semifinals
(Thailand) P Isaro (China) A Wang	4	6	[10]
(India) SKR Ganta (Japan) R Noguchi	6	1	[8]
(Chinese Taipei) T-h Huang (South Africa) K van Wyk	3	5
2	(Chinese Taipei) R Ho (United Kingdom) J Paris	6	7

Final
(Thailand) P Isaro (China) A Wang	7^{7}	6
2	(Chinese Taipei) R Ho (United Kingdom) J Paris	6^{4}	3
