= 2024 Shenzhen Longhua Open – Singles =

Singles
- 2024 Shenzhen Longhua Open

Final
- Champion: (United States) Mackenzie McDonald
- Runner-up: (France) Arthur Cazaux
- Score: 6–4, 7–6^{(7–4)}

Events
Singles	Doubles
← 2023 ·	Shenzhen Longhua Open	· 2025 →

Aleksandar Kovacevic was the defending champion but chose not to defend his title.

Mackenzie McDonald won the title after defeating Arthur Cazaux 6–4, 7–6^{(7–4)} in the final.

== Seeds ==
1. (France) Arthur Cazaux (final)
2. (Australia) Adam Walton (semifinals)
3. (United Kingdom) Billy Harris (second round)
4. (France) Ugo Blanchet (first round)
5. (United States) Mackenzie McDonald (champion)
6. (Chinese Taipei) Hsu Yu-hsiou (first round)
7. (Japan) Yuta Shimizu (first round)
8. (Australia) James McCabe (quarterfinals, retired)

== Draw ==
Key

- Q = Qualifier
- WC = Wild card
- LL = Lucky loser
- Alt = Alternate
- ITF = ITF entry
- PR = Protected ranking
- SR = Special ranking
- SE = Special exempt
- JE = Junior exempt
- JR = Junior Accelerator Programme entrant
- CO = College Accelerator Programme entrant
- NG = Next Gen Accelerator Program entrant
- w/o = Walkover
- r = Retired
- d = Defaulted

=== Finals ===
Semifinals
1	(France) Arthur Cazaux	6	6
(China) Bai Yan	4	0
5	(United States) Mackenzie McDonald	6	6
2	(Australia) Adam Walton	3	4

Final
1	(France) Arthur Cazaux	4	6^{4}
5	(United States) Mackenzie McDonald	6	7^{7}

=== Top half ===
First round
1	(France) A Cazaux	6	6
Q	(China) Zeng Yaojie	3	2
Q	(China) Zhang Tianhui	3	6	7
(Australia) P Sekulic	6	3	5
Q	(France) A Weber	4	7	6
(Japan) K Uchida	6	5	3
WC	(China) R Te	6	6
7	(Japan) Y Shimizu	3	4
3	(United Kingdom) B Harris	6	6^{1}	6
(Thailand) K Samrej	4	7^{7}	3
(Georgia (country)) S Purtseladze	6	6
WC	(China) Chen Xingdao	3	1
(India) M Sasikumar	6	3	6
P Bar Biryukov	1	6	2
(China) Y Bai	6	3	6
6	(Chinese Taipei) Y-h Hsu	4	6	2

Second round
1	(France) A Cazaux	7^{7}	6
Q	(China) T Zhang	6^{5}	1
Q	(France) A Weber	6	7
WC	(China) R Te	3	5
3	(United Kingdom) B Harris	4	6^{5}
(Georgia (country)) S Purtseladze	6	7^{7}
(India) M Sasikumar	2	4
(China) Y Bai	6	6

Quarterfinals
1	(France) A Cazaux	6	6
Q	(France) A Weber	1	3
(Georgia (country)) S Purtseladze	5	2^{r}
(China) Y Bai	7	5

Semifinals
1	(France) A Cazaux	6	6
(China) Y Bai	4	0

=== Bottom half ===
First round
5	(United States) M McDonald	7^{7}	6^{5}	6
Q	(Australia) T Fancutt	6^{5}	7^{7}	1
(Japan) Y Takahashi	3	2
(Japan) R Noguchi	6	6
Q	(Malaysia) Mitsuki Wei Kang Leong	6^{4}	6	5
(South Africa) Kris van Wyk	7^{7}	2	7
(India) R Ramanathan	7^{7}	6^{6}	7^{10}
4	(France) U Blanchet	6^{4}	7^{8}	6^{8}
8	(Australia) J McCabe	2	6	6
(Ukraine) Vadym Ursu	6	3	3
WC	(China) Xiao Linang	6	6
Alt	(China) Y Mo	1	4
Q	(Japan) Ryuki Matsuda	5	3
(China) F Sun	7	6
(China) J Cui	4	3
2	(Australia) A Walton	6	6

Second round
5	(United States) M McDonald	6	6
(Japan) R Noguchi	2	3
(South Africa) K van Wyk	6	7^{8}
(India) R Ramanathan	4	6^{6}
8	(Australia) J McCabe	6	6
WC	(China) L Xiao	3	3
(China) F Sun	6^{5}	5
2	(Australia) A Walton	7^{7}	7

Quarterfinals
5	(United States) M McDonald	6	6
(South Africa) K van Wyk	3	2
8	(Australia) J McCabe	3	0^{r}
2	(Australia) A Walton	6	3

Semifinals
5	(United States) M McDonald	6	6
2	(Australia) A Walton	3	4
