= 2017 Shenzhen Longhua Open – Women's doubles =

Women's doubles
- 2017 Shenzhen Longhua Open

Final
- Champion: (United States) Jacqueline Cako (Serbia) Nina Stojanović
- Runner-up: (Japan) Shuko Aoyama (China) Yang Zhaoxuan
- Score: 6–4, 6–2

Events
| Singles | men | women |
| Doubles | men | women |
| ← 2016 · | Shenzhen Longhua Open | · 2018 → |

Nina Stojanović and You Xiaodi were the defending champions, but both players chose to compete with different partners. You chose to compete with Lu Jingjing but lost in the first round to Ingrid Neel and Anastasia Pivovarova.

Stojanović played alongside Jacqueline Cako and successfully defended her title after defeating Shuko Aoyama and Yang Zhaoxuan 6–4, 6–2 in the final.

== Seeds ==
1. (Japan) Shuko Aoyama / (China) Yang Zhaoxuan (final)
2. (United States) Jacqueline Cako / (Serbia) Nina Stojanović (champions)
3. (China) Lu Jingjing / (China) You Xiaodi (first round)
4. (China) Jiang Xinyu / (China) Tang Qianhui (semifinals)

== Draw ==
=== Key ===
- Q = Qualifier
- WC = Wild card
- LL = Lucky loser
- Alt = Alternate
- SE = Special exempt
- PR = Protected ranking
- ITF = ITF entry
- JE = Junior exempt
- w/o = Walkover
- r = Retired
- d = Defaulted
- SR = Special ranking

First round
1 | (Japan) S Aoyama (China) Z Yang | 6 | 4
WC | (China) H Guo (China) Xin Wang | 3 | 2^{r}
(Japan) A Okuno (China) F Xun | 6 | 6
(Serbia) N Kostić (Canada) C Zhao | 1 | 2
3 | (China) Jin Lu (China) X You | 6 | 2 | [13]
(United States) I Neel (Russia) A Pivovarova | 1 | 6 | [15]
(China) A Gai (China) Yi Zhang | 6^{3} | 4
(South Korea) D-b Kim (China) Q Ye | 7^{7} | 6
(Switzerland) J Teichmann (Germany) A Zaja
(United Kingdom) K Dunne (United Kingdom) L Robson | w/o
(South Korea) N-l Han (South Korea) S-r Lee | 2 | 1
4 | (China) X Jiang (China) Q Tang | 6 | 6
(Russia) A Gasanova (India) A Raina | 3 | 6 | [10]
(China) X Sun (China) Z Sun | 6 | 2 | [6]
WC | (China) S Feng (China) Jiax Lu | 3 | 6 | [7]
2 | (United States) J Cako (Serbia) N Stojanović | 6 | 4 | [10]

Quarterfinals
1 | (Japan) S Aoyama (China) Z Yang | 6 | 6
(Japan) A Okuno (China) F Xun | 1 | 1
(United States) I Neel (Russia) A Pivovarova | 6^{3} | 4
(South Korea) D-b Kim (China) Q Ye | 7^{7} | 6
(United Kingdom) K Dunne (United Kingdom) L Robson | 4 | 4
4 | (China) X Jiang (China) Q Tang | 6 | 6
(Russia) A Gasanova (India) A Raina | 2 | 5
2 | (United States) J Cako (Serbia) N Stojanović | 6 | 7

Semifinals
1 | (Japan) S Aoyama (China) Z Yang | 6 | 6
(South Korea) D-b Kim (China) Q Ye | 3 | 1
4 | (China) X Jiang (China) Q Tang | 6^{5} | 2
2 | (United States) J Cako (Serbia) N Stojanović | 7^{7} | 6

Final
1 | (Japan) S Aoyama (China) Z Yang | 4 | 2
2 | (United States) J Cako (Serbia) N Stojanović | 6 | 6
