= 2018 Shenzhen Longhua Open – Women's singles =

Women's singles
- 2018 Shenzhen Longhua Open

Final
- Champion: (Serbia) Ivana Jorović
- Runner-up: (China) Zheng Saisai
- Score: 6–3, 2–6, 6–4

Events
Singles	men	women
Doubles	men	women
← 2017 ·	Shenzhen Longhua Open	· 2019 →

Carol Zhao was the defending champion, but lost to Ivana Jorović in the quarterfinals.

Jorović went on to win the title, defeating Zheng Saisai in the final, 6–3, 2–6, 6–4.

== Seeds ==
1. (China) Zheng Saisai (final)
2. (China) Wang Yafan (quarterfinals)
3. (Thailand) Luksika Kumkhum (quarterfinals)
4. (China) Zhu Lin (withdrew)
5. (Japan) Nao Hibino (first round)
6. (Uzbekistan) Sabina Sharipova (first round)
7. (Japan) Misaki Doi (semifinals)
8. (China) Duan Yingying (first round)

== Draw ==
=== Key ===
- Q = Qualifier
- WC = Wild card
- LL = Lucky loser
- Alt = Alternate
- SE = Special exempt
- PR = Protected ranking
- ITF = ITF entry
- JE = Junior exempt
- w/o = Walkover
- r = Retired
- d = Defaulted
- SR = Special ranking

=== Finals ===
Semifinals
1	(China) Zheng Saisai	6	6
7	(Japan) Misaki Doi	4	1
(Serbia) Ivana Jorović	6	3	7^{7}
(Montenegro) Danka Kovinić	3	6	6^{5}

Final
1	(China) Zheng Saisai	3	6	4
(Serbia) Ivana Jorović	6	2	6

=== Top half ===
First round
1	(China) S Zheng	7	6
(Netherlands) B Schoofs	5	1
(China) F Xun	6^{7}	3
(India) A Raina	7^{9}	6
(Kazakhstan) E Rybakina	6	6
(China) Yu Zhang	0	1
(Greece) V Grammatikopoulou	6	6
5	(Japan) N Hibino	3	4
3	(Thailand) L Kumkhum	6	0
Q	(China) Jin Lu	3	0^{r}
LL	(South Korea) D-b Kim	3	2
WC	(China) Xin Wang	6	6
(China) Jia Lu	5	6	6
Q	(Japan) J Namigata	7	4	3
(China) F Liu	3	0^{r}
7	(Japan) M Doi	6	0

Second round
1	(China) S Zheng	6	6
(India) A Raina	3	1
(Kazakhstan) E Rybakina	4	6	3
(Greece) V Grammatikopoulou	6	3	6
3	(Thailand) L Kumkhum	6	6
WC	(China) Xin Wang	3	4
(China) Jia Lu	3	2
7	(Japan) M Doi	6	6

Quarterfinals
1	(China) S Zheng	6	6
(Greece) V Grammatikopoulou	2	1
3	(Thailand) L Kumkhum	3	2
7	(Japan) M Doi	6	6

Semifinals
1	(China) S Zheng	6	6
7	(Japan) M Doi	4	1

=== Bottom half ===
First round
8	(China) Y Duan	4	6	3
Q	(Russia) O Doroshina	6	1	6
(Poland) M Fręch	6	4	5
(Canada) C Zhao	2	6	7
WC	(China) S Ma	6	6
WC	(China) Z Yang	3	4
(Serbia) I Jorović	6	7^{7}
LL	(Thailand) P Plipuech	2	6^{5}
6	(Uzbekistan) S Sharipova	5	1
(Montenegro) D Kovinić	7	6
LL	(China) Y Yuan	4	1
SE	(South Korea) N-l Han	6	6
(Switzerland) J Teichmann	3	6	3
Q	(South Korea) S-j Jang	6	4	6
WC	(China) M Wang	2	4
2	(China) Y Wang	6	6

Second round
Q	(Russia) O Doroshina	5	0
(Canada) C Zhao	7	6
WC	(China) S Ma	3	6	4
(Serbia) I Jorović	6	4	6
(Montenegro) D Kovinić	6	6
SE	(South Korea) N-l Han	3	4
Q	(South Korea) S-j Jang	3	0
2	(China) Y Wang	6	6

Quarterfinals
(Canada) C Zhao	2	1
(Serbia) I Jorović	6	6
(Montenegro) D Kovinić	6	6
2	(China) Y Wang	2	3

Semifinals
(Serbia) I Jorović	6	3	7^{7}
(Montenegro) D Kovinić	3	6	6^{5}
