= 2023 Shenzhen Longhua Open – Women's singles =

Women's singles
- 2023 Shenzhen Longhua Open

Final
- Champion: (China) Bai Zhuoxuan
- Runner-up: (China) Yuan Yue
- Score: 7–6^{(7–5)}, 6–2

Events
Singles	men	women
Doubles	men	women
← 2019 ·	Shenzhen Longhua Open	· 2024 →

Zhu Lin is the reigning champion from when the tournament was last held in 2019, but chose not to compete this year.

Bai Zhuoxuan won the title, defeating Yuan Yue in the final, 7–6^{(7–5)}, 6–2.

== Seeds ==
1. (China) Bai Zhuoxuan (champion)
2. (China) Yuan Yue (final)
3. (Hungary) Tímea Babos (quarterfinals)
4. (Japan) Moyuka Uchijima (first round)
5. (France) Kristina Mladenovic (quarterfinals)
6. (Canada) Carol Zhao (semifinals)
7. (Hong Kong) Eudice Chong (quarterfinals, withdrew)
8. (Thailand) Lanlana Tararudee (quarterfinals)

== Draw ==
=== Key ===
- Q = Qualifier
- WC = Wild card
- LL = Lucky loser
- Alt = Alternate
- ITF = ITF entry
- PR = Protected ranking
- SR = Special ranking
- SE = Special exempt
- JE = Junior exempt
- JR = Junior Accelerator Programme entrant
- CO = College Accelerator Programme entrant
- NG = Next Gen Accelerator Program entrant
- w/o = Walkover
- r = Retired
- d = Defaulted

=== Finals ===
Semifinals
1	(China) Bai Zhuoxuan	6	4	6
6	(Canada) Carol Zhao	3	6	2
Sofya Lansere	0^{r}
2	(China) Yuan Yue	2

Final
1	(China) Bai Zhuoxuan	7^{7}	6
2	(China) Yuan Yue	6^{5}	2

=== Top half ===
First round
1	(China) Z Bai	6	6
Q	(China) Y Ren	2	2
WC	(China) M Wang	4	2
(China) J Lu	6	6
Q	(Hong Kong) H-c Wu	7	6
(Georgia (country)) S Shapatava	5	3
Q	(China) Y Yang	4	3
5	(France) K Mladenovic	6	6
3	(Hungary) T Babos	6	6
(China) X Yao	3	2
(Turkey) I Yörük	5	6	6
WC	(China) T Mi	7	4	4
(Thailand) M Sawangkaew	6	1	3
(Hong Kong) C Wong	2	6	6
Q	(China) M Guo	4	4
6	(Canada) C Zhao	6	6

Second round
1	(China) Z Bai	6	6
(China) J Lu	2	3
Q	(Hong Kong) H-c Wu	2	2
5	(France) K Mladenovic	6	6
3	(Hungary) T Babos	6	6
(Turkey) I Yörük	1	1
(Hong Kong) C Wong	1	3
6	(Canada) C Zhao	6	6

Quarterfinals
1	(China) Z Bai	6	6
5	(France) K Mladenovic	0	3
3	(Hungary) T Babos	6	3	3
6	(Canada) C Zhao	2	6	6

Semifinals
1	(China) Z Bai	6	4	6
6	(Canada) C Zhao	3	6	2

=== Bottom half ===
First round
8	(Thailand) L Tararudee	1	6	6
A Kovaleva	6	2	2
Q	(Chinese Taipei) I-h Cho	5
Q	(Chinese Taipei) Y-t Cho	1^{r}
(South Korea) S-h Park	1	0
S Lansere	6	6
(Chinese Taipei) E-s Liang	2	6	7
4	(Japan) M Uchijima	6	3	5
7	(Hong Kong) E Chong	6	7^{10}
(China) Q Tang	2	6^{8}
(Ukraine) K Volodko	7	6
Q	(Belgium) C Vlasselaer	5	4
Q	A Gureva	4	6	4
(China) F Liu	6	3	6
WC	(China) Y Zhang	0	1
2	(China) Y Yuan	6	6

Second round
8	(Thailand) L Tararudee	6	6
Q	(Chinese Taipei) I-h Cho	1	4
S Lansere	6	6
(Chinese Taipei) E-s Liang	0	1
7	(Hong Kong) E Chong	7^{7}	2	7^{7}
(Ukraine) K Volodko	6^{5}	6	6^{5}
(China) F Liu	2	0
2	(China) Y Yuan	6	6

Quarterfinals
8	(Thailand) L Tararudee	1	3
S Lansere	6	6
7	(Hong Kong) E Chong
2	(China) Y Yuan	w/o

Semifinals
S Lansere	0^{r}
2	(China) Y Yuan	2
