= 2019 Shenzhen Longhua Open =

- Date: 28 October–3 November (men); 4–10 November (women)
- Edition: 4th (women); 3rd (men)
- Category: ATP Challenger Tour; ITF Women's Circuit
- Surface: Hard
- Location: Shenzhen, China

Champions

Men's singles
- (China) Zhang Zhizhen

Women's singles
- (China) Zhu Lin

Men's doubles
- (Chinese Taipei) Hsieh Cheng-peng / (Chinese Taipei) Yang Tsung-hua

Women's doubles
- (Japan) Nao Hibino / (Japan) Makoto Ninomiya
← 2018 ·	Shenzhen Longhua Open	· 2023 →

The 2019 Shenzhen Longhua Open was a professional tennis tournament played on hard courts. It was the third (men) and fourth (women) editions of the tournament which was part of the 2019 ATP Challenger Tour and the 2019 ITF Women's World Tennis Tour. It took place in Shenzhen, China between 28 October and 10 November 2019.

== Men's singles main-draw entrants ==
=== Seeds ===
Country	Player	Rank^{1}	Seed
KOR	Kwon Soon-woo	89	1
~~ESP~~	~~Alejandro Davidovich Fokina~~	~~93~~	~~2~~
JPN	Yūichi Sugita	107	3
JPN	Go Soeda	126	4
TPE	Jason Jung	134	5
CAN	Steven Diez	136	6
TUN	Malek Jaziri	150	7
CHN	Zhang Zhizhen	182	8
ESP	Enrique López Pérez	183	9
IND	Ramkumar Ramanathan	193	10
~~SRB~~	~~Danilo Petrović~~	~~195~~	~~11~~
USA	Christopher Eubanks	204	12
POR	Frederico Ferreira Silva	206	13
UZB	Denis Istomin	211	14
EGY	Mohamed Safwat	217	15
CHN	Bai Yan	221	16

- ^{1} Rankings are as of 21 October 2019.

=== Other entrants ===
The following players received wildcards into the singles main draw:

- (China) Cui Jie
- (China) Gao Xin
- (China) Li Yuanfeng
- (China) Mo Yecong
- (China) Wang Chuhan

The following player received entry into the singles main draw using a protected ranking:

- (Colombia) Nicolás Barrientos

The following player received entry into the singles main draw as an alternate:

- (Czech Republic) Jonáš Forejtek

The following players received entry from the qualifying draw:

- (China) Duan Jiaqi
- (France) Fabien Reboul

The following players received entry as lucky losers:

- (Japan) Toshihide Matsui
- (Croatia) Matej Sabanov

== Women's singles main-draw entrants ==
=== Seeds ===
Country	Player	Rank^{1}	Seed
CHN	Peng Shuai	77	1
CHN	Zhu Lin	95	2
JPN	Nao Hibino	98	3
SRB	Nina Stojanović	101	4
HUN	Tímea Babos	103	5
MNE	Danka Kovinić	108	6
ITA	Jasmine Paolini	119	7
SLO	Kaja Juvan	127	8

- ^{1} Rankings are as of 21 October 2019

=== Other entrants ===
The following players received wildcards into the singles main draw:

- (China) Liu Chang
- (China) Wang Danni
- (China) Zhang Ying
- (China) Zheng Wushuang

The following player received a special exempt into the singles main draw:

- (Australia) Arina Rodionova

The following players received entry from the qualifying draw:

- (China) Liu Fangzhou
- (Japan) Chihiro Muramatsu
- (Thailand) Peangtarn Plipuech
- (Poland) Urszula Radwańska
- (Georgia (country)) Sofia Shapatava
- (Ukraine) Daria Snigur
- (China) Xun Fangying
- (China) You Xiaodi

== Champions ==
=== Men's singles ===
- (China) Zhang Zhizhen def. (China) Li Zhe 6–3, 4–6, 6–1.

=== Women's singles ===
- (China) Zhu Lin def. (China) Peng Shuai, 6–3, 1–3, ret.

=== Men's doubles ===
- (Chinese Taipei) Hsieh Cheng-peng / (Chinese Taipei) Yang Tsung-hua def. (Russia) Mikhail Elgin / (India) Ramkumar Ramanathan 6–2, 7–5.

=== Women's doubles ===
- (Japan) Nao Hibino / (Japan) Makoto Ninomiya def. (Georgia (country)) Sofia Shapatava / (United Kingdom) Emily Webley-Smith, 6–4, 6–0
