= 2023 Takasaki Open 2 =

Tennis tournament

- Date: 20–26 November 2023
- Edition: 1st
- Category: ITF Women's World Tennis Tour
- Prize money: $100,000
- Surface: Hard / Outdoor
- Location: Takasaki, Japan

Champions

Singles
- (China) Bai Zhuoxuan

Doubles
- (Thailand) Luksika Kumkhum / (Thailand) Peangtarn Plipuech
Takasaki Open	· 2024 →

The 2023 Takasaki Open 2 is a professional tennis tournament played on outdoor hard courts. It is the second edition of the tournament which was part of the 2023 ITF Women's World Tennis Tour. It took place in Takasaki, Japan between 20 and 26 November 2023.

== Champions ==
=== Singles ===
- (China) Bai Zhuoxuan def. (China) Yuan Yue 6–2, 6–3.

=== Doubles ===
- (Thailand) Luksika Kumkhum / (Thailand) Peangtarn Plipuech def. (Chinese Taipei) Liang En-shuo / (Chinese Taipei) Wu Fang-hsien 6–3, 6–1.

== Singles main draw entrants ==
=== Seeds ===
Country	Player	Rank^{1}	Seed
CZE	Linda Fruhvirtová	89	1
CHN	Wang Yafan	97	2
CHN	Bai Zhuoxuan	106	3
CHN	Yuan Yue	107	4
AUS	Kimberly Birrell	112	5
JPN	Mai Hontama	128	6
HUN	Dalma Gálfi	138	7
GBR	Harriet Dart	140	8

- ^{1} Rankings are as of 13 November 2023.

=== Other entrants ===
The following players received wildcards into the singles main draw:

- (Japan) Sayaka Ishii
- (Japan) Ena Koike
- (Japan) Sara Saito
- (Japan) Ayano Shimizu

The following player received entry into the singles main draw using a special ranking:

- (Liechtenstein) Kathinka von Deichmann

The following players received entry from the qualifying draw:

- (Israel) Lina Glushko
- (China) Guo Hanyu
- (Japan) Aoi Ito
- (Japan) Haruka Kaji
- (Japan) Momoko Kobori
- (Thailand) Luksika Kumkhum
- (Japan) Kyōka Okamura
- (Japan) Ena Shibahara

The following player received entry as a lucky loser:

- (Thailand) Mananchaya Sawangkaew
