= 2017 Shenzhen Longhua Open – Men's doubles =

Men's doubles
- 2017 Shenzhen Longhua Open

Final
- Champions: (India) Sriram Balaji (India) Vishnu Vardhan
- Runners-up: (United States) Austin Krajicek (United States) Jackson Withrow
- Score: 7–6^{(7–3)}, 7–6^{(7–3)}

Events
Singles	men	women
Doubles	men	women
Shenzhen Longhua Open	· 2018 →

This was the first edition of the men's tournament.

Sriram Balaji and Vishnu Vardhan won the title after defeating Austin Krajicek and Jackson Withrow 7–6^{(7–3)}, 7–6^{(7–3)} in the final.

== Seeds ==
1. (India) Jeevan Nedunchezhiyan / (Indonesia) Christopher Rungkat (first round)
2. (Chinese Taipei) Hsieh Cheng-peng / (Chinese Taipei) Peng Hsien-yin (first round)
3. (United States) James Cerretani / (Japan) Toshihide Matsui (semifinals)
4. (United States) Austin Krajicek / (United States) Jackson Withrow (final)

== Draw ==
=== Key ===
- Q = Qualifier
- WC = Wild card
- LL = Lucky loser
- Alt = Alternate
- SE = Special exempt
- PR = Protected ranking
- ITF = ITF entry
- JE = Junior exempt
- w/o = Walkover
- r = Retired
- d = Defaulted
- SR = Special ranking

First round
1	(India) J Nedunchezhiyan (Indonesia) C Rungkat	6	6^{10}	[7]
(Italy) R Ghedin (Belarus) Y Shyla	4	7^{12}	[10]
(Serbia) M Kecmanović (Serbia) D Petrović	6^{5}	6	[7]
(China) Z Li (Canada) P Polansky	7^{7}	3	[10]
4	(United States) A Krajicek (United States) J Withrow	6	3	[16]
(Chinese Taipei) J Jung (South Korea) S-w Kwon	1	6	[14]
(Australia) M Purcell (Australia) A Santillan	7	6
(France) S Doumbia (France) C Hemery	5	1
WC	(China) D Wu (China) Y Wu	6^{3}	7^{7}	[10]
WC	(China) Y Bai (China) M Gong	7^{7}	6^{3}	[7]
(Egypt) M Safwat (Chinese Taipei) T-h Yang	0	2
3	(United States) J Cerretani (Japan) T Matsui	6	6
WC	(China) R Te (China) Xia Zihao	2	4
Alt	(Russia) T Gabashvili (Poland) H Hurkacz	6	6
(India) S Balaji (India) V Vardhan	5	6	[10]
2	(Chinese Taipei) C-p Hsieh (Chinese Taipei) H-y Peng	7	3	[8]

Quarterfinals
(Italy) R Ghedin (Belarus) Y Shyla	6	3	[10]
(China) Z Li (Canada) P Polansky	4	6	[12]
4	(United States) A Krajicek (United States) J Withrow	7^{7}	6
(Australia) M Purcell (Australia) A Santillan	6^{5}	3
WC	(China) D Wu (China) Y Wu	7^{7}	6^{3}	[9]
3	(United States) J Cerretani (Japan) T Matsui	6^{5}	7^{7}	[11]
Alt	(Russia) T Gabashvili (Poland) H Hurkacz	4	4
(India) S Balaji (India) V Vardhan	6	6

Semifinals
(China) Z Li (Canada) P Polansky	7^{7}	3	[9]
4	(United States) A Krajicek (United States) J Withrow	6^{5}	6	[11]
3	(United States) J Cerretani (Japan) T Matsui	6^{5}	6^{4}
(India) S Balaji (India) V Vardhan	7^{7}	7^{7}

Final
4	(United States) A Krajicek (United States) J Withrow	6^{3}	6^{3}
(India) S Balaji (India) V Vardhan	7^{7}	7^{7}
