= 2019 Shenzhen Longhua Open – Men's doubles =

Men's doubles
- 2019 Shenzhen Longhua Open

Final
- Champions: (Chinese Taipei) Hsieh Cheng-peng (Chinese Taipei) Yang Tsung-hua
- Runners-up: (Russia) Mikhail Elgin (India) Ramkumar Ramanathan
- Score: 6–2, 7–5

Events
Singles	men	women
Doubles	men	women
- Shenzhen Longhua Open

Hsieh Cheng-peng and Christopher Rungkat were the defending champions but chose to defend their title with different partners. Hsieh partnered Yang Tsung-hua and successfully defended his title. Rungkat partnered André Göransson but lost in the first round to Sadio Doumbia and Fabien Reboul.

Hsieh and Yang won the title after defeating Mikhail Elgin and Ramkumar Ramanathan 6–2, 7–5 in the final.

== Seeds ==
1. (Sweden) André Göransson / (Indonesia) Christopher Rungkat (first round)
2. (Chinese Taipei) Hsieh Cheng-peng / (Chinese Taipei) Yang Tsung-hua (champions)
3. (India) Jeevan Nedunchezhiyan / (Canada) Adil Shamasdin (quarterfinals)
4. (China) Gong Maoxin / (China) Li Zhe (quarterfinals)

== Draw ==
Key

- Q = Qualifier
- WC = Wild card
- LL = Lucky loser
- Alt = Alternate
- ITF = ITF entry
- PR = Protected ranking
- SR = Special ranking
- SE = Special exempt
- JE = Junior exempt
- JR = Junior Accelerator Programme entrant
- CO = College Accelerator Programme entrant
- NG = Next Gen Accelerator Program entrant
- w/o = Walkover
- r = Retired
- d = Defaulted

First round
1	(Sweden) A Göransson (Indonesia) C Rungkat	6^{4}	7	[4]
(France) S Doumbia (France) F Reboul	7^{7}	5	[10]
(Russia) T Gabashvili (Tunisia) M Jaziri
(Japan) T Matsui (India) V Vardhan	w/o
3	(India) J Nedunchezhiyan (Canada) A Shamasdin	6	7^{7}
WC	(China) J Cui (China) Wu Hao	0	6^{1}
PR	(Russia) M Elgin (India) R Ramanathan	6	6
(Portugal) G Oliveira (China) F Sun	3	3
(Croatia) I Sabanov (Croatia) M Sabanov	6	7^{10}
WC	(China) X Gao (China) A Wang	2	6^{8}
(Canada) S Diez (Egypt) M Safwat
4	(China) M Gong (China) Z Li	w/o
WC	(China) C Wang (China) D Wu	6	1	[7]
(South Korea) J-s Nam (South Korea) M-k Song	1	6	[10]
PR	(Colombia) N Barrientos (Spain) E López Pérez	6	5	[8]
2	(Chinese Taipei) C-p Hsieh (Chinese Taipei) T-h Yang	4	7	[10]

Quarterfinals
(France) S Doumbia (France) F Reboul
(Japan) T Matsui (India) V Vardhan	w/o
3	(India) J Nedunchezhiyan (Canada) A Shamasdin	4	6^{3}
PR	(Russia) M Elgin (India) R Ramanathan	6	7^{7}
(Croatia) I Sabanov (Croatia) M Sabanov	6	6
4	(China) M Gong (China) Z Li	3	3
(South Korea) J-s Nam (South Korea) M-k Song	6	6^{5}	[9]
2	(Chinese Taipei) C-p Hsieh (Chinese Taipei) T-h Yang	1	7^{7}	[11]

Semifinals
(Japan) T Matsui (India) V Vardhan	5	6^{0}
PR	(Russia) M Elgin (India) R Ramanathan	7	7^{7}
(Croatia) I Sabanov (Croatia) M Sabanov	6^{5}	1
2	(Chinese Taipei) C-p Hsieh (Chinese Taipei) T-h Yang	7^{7}	6

Final
PR	(Russia) M Elgin (India) R Ramanathan	2	5
2	(Chinese Taipei) C-p Hsieh (Chinese Taipei) T-h Yang	6	7
