= 2016 ITF Women's Circuit – Shenzhen Longhua =

- Date: 14–20 November
- Edition: 1st
- Category: ITF Women's Circuit
- Prize money: $100,000
- Surface: Hard
- Location: Shenzhen, China

Champions

Singles
- (China) Peng Shuai

Doubles
- (Serbia) Nina Stojanović / (China) You Xiaodi
ITF Women's Circuit – Shenzhen Longhua	· 2017 →

The 2016 ITF Women's Circuit – Shenzhen Longhua was a professional tennis tournament played on outdoor hard courts. It was the 1st edition of the tournament and part of the 2016 ITF Women's Circuit, offering a total of $100,000 in prize money. It took place in Shenzhen, China, on 14–20 November 2016.

== Singles main draw entrants ==
=== Seeds ===
Country	Player	Rank^{1}	Seed
CHN	Wang Qiang	70	1
CHN	Duan Yingying	102	2
CHN	Han Xinyun	108	3
CHN	Peng Shuai	109	4
ROU	Patricia Maria Țig	112	5
CHN	Zhu Lin	140	6
SRB	Nina Stojanović	142	7
KOR	Jang Su-jeong	150	8

- ^{1} Rankings as of 7 November 2016.

=== Other entrants ===
The following players received a wildcard into the singles main draw:

- (China) Liang Chen
- (China) Wang Xinyu
- (China) Wang Xiyu
- (China) Xu Yifan

The following players received entry from the qualifying draw:

- (China) Guo Hanyu
- (China) Sun Ziyue
- (China) Tang Haochen
- (Slovakia) Zuzana Zlochová

The following player received entry by a protected ranking:

- (Croatia) Tereza Mrdeža

== Champions ==
=== Women's singles ===
- (China) Peng Shuai def. (Romania) Patricia Maria Țig, 3–6, 7–5, 6–4

=== Women's doubles ===
- (Serbia) Nina Stojanović / (China) You Xiaodi def. (China) Han Xinyun / (China) Zhu Lin, 6–4, 7–6^{(8–6)}
