= 2023 Shenzhen Longhua Open – Men's doubles =

Men's doubles
- 2023 Shenzhen Longhua Open

Final
- Champions: (Austria) Alexander Erler (Austria) Lucas Miedler
- Runners-up: (Poland) Piotr Matuszewski (Australia) Matthew Romios
- Score: 6–3, 6–4

Events
Singles	men	women
Doubles	men	women
- Shenzhen Longhua Open

Hsieh Cheng-peng and Yang Tsung-hua were the defending champions but chose not to defend their title.

Alexander Erler and Lucas Miedler won the title after defeating Piotr Matuszewski and Matthew Romios 6–3, 6–4 in the final.

== Seeds ==
1. (Austria) Alexander Erler / (Austria) Lucas Miedler (champions)
2. (Poland) Piotr Matuszewski / (Australia) Matthew Romios (final)
3. (Zimbabwe) Benjamin Lock / (New Zealand) Rubin Statham (first round)
4. (Philippines) Francis Alcantara / (China) Sun Fajing (first round)

== Draw ==
Key

- Q = Qualifier
- WC = Wild card
- LL = Lucky loser
- Alt = Alternate
- ITF = ITF entry
- PR = Protected ranking
- SR = Special ranking
- SE = Special exempt
- JE = Junior exempt
- JR = Junior Accelerator Programme entrant
- CO = College Accelerator Programme entrant
- NG = Next Gen Accelerator Program entrant
- w/o = Walkover
- r = Retired
- d = Defaulted

First round
1	(Austria) A Erler (Austria) L Miedler	6	6
WC	(China) Y Mo (China) Zeng Yaojie	2	1
(China) X Gao (China) A Wang	6^{5}	1
E Donskoy; E Gerasimov	7^{7}	6
4	(Philippines) FC Alcantara (China) F Sun	3	1
(Chinese Taipei) Y-h Hsu (Chinese Taipei) T-h Huang	6	6
(Canada) S Diez (Italy) L Giustino	2	6	[7]
WC	(China) Y Bai (China) Y Zhou	6	2	[10]
Mikalai Haliak (Vietnam) NH Lý	4	1
A Kachmazov (Kazakhstan) D Yevseyev	6	6
(Australia) L Saville (Australia) L Tu	6	7^{7}
3	(Zimbabwe) B Lock (New Zealand) R Statham	3	6^{2}
(China) Z Li (China) R Te	6	2	[9]
(Greece) M Kalovelonis (Northern Mariana Islands) C Sinclair	3	6	[11]
(China) Y Bu (Chinese Taipei) R Ho	3	6^{5}
2	(Poland) P Matuszewski (Australia) MC Romios	6	7^{7}

Quarterfinals
1	(Austria) A Erler (Austria) L Miedler	6	7
E Donskoy; E Gerasimov	2	5
(Chinese Taipei) Y-h Hsu (Chinese Taipei) T-h Huang	4	6	[10]
WC	(China) Y Bai (China) Y Zhou	6	4	[12]
A Kachmazov (Kazakhstan) D Yevseyev	4	2
(Australia) L Saville (Australia) L Tu	6	6
(Greece) M Kalovelonis (Northern Mariana Islands) C Sinclair	2	1
2	(Poland) P Matuszewski (Australia) MC Romios	6	6

Semifinals
1	(Austria) A Erler (Austria) L Miedler	6	7^{7}
WC	(China) Y Bai (China) Y Zhou	2	6^{5}
(Australia) L Saville (Australia) L Tu	5	6	[7]
2	(Poland) P Matuszewski (Australia) MC Romios	7	3	[10]

Final
1	(Austria) A Erler (Austria) L Miedler	6	6
2	(Poland) P Matuszewski (Australia) MC Romios	3	4
