= 2017 Shenzhen Longhua Open – Men's singles =

Men's singles
- 2017 Shenzhen Longhua Open

Final
- Champion: (Moldova) Radu Albot
- Runner-up: (Poland) Hubert Hurkacz
- Score: 7–6^{(8–6)}, 6–7^{(3–7)}, 6–4

Events
Singles	men	women
Doubles	men	women
Shenzhen Longhua Open	· 2018 →

This was the first edition of the men's tournament.

Radu Albot won the title after defeating Hubert Hurkacz 7–6^{(8–6)}, 6–7^{(3–7)}, 6–4 in the final.

== Seeds ==
1. (Russia) Mikhail Youzhny (semifinals)
2. (Slovenia) Blaž Kavčič (semifinals)
3. (Moldova) Radu Albot (champion)
4. (Canada) Peter Polansky (second round, retired)
5. (Brazil) Thiago Monteiro (first round)
6. (Australia) Akira Santillan (second round)
7. (Japan) Go Soeda (withdrew)
8. (France) Calvin Hemery (first round)
9. (South Korea) Lee Duck-hee (second round)

== Draw ==
=== Key ===
- Q = Qualifier
- WC = Wild card
- LL = Lucky loser
- Alt = Alternate
- SE = Special exempt
- PR = Protected ranking
- ITF = ITF entry
- JE = Junior exempt
- w/o = Walkover
- r = Retired
- d = Defaulted
- SR = Special ranking

=== Finals ===
Semifinals
1	(Russia) Mikhail Youzhny	3	2
3	(Moldova) Radu Albot	6	6
Q	(Poland) Hubert Hurkacz	7^{7}	7
2	(Slovenia) Blaž Kavčič	6^{1}	5

Final
3	(Moldova) Radu Albot	7^{8}	6^{3}	6
Q	(Poland) Hubert Hurkacz	6^{6}	7^{7}	4

=== Top half ===
First round
1	(Russia) M Youzhny	6	6
(Japan) H Moriya	1	3
(India) P Gunneswaran	6	6
Q	(Netherlands) Miliaan Niesten	0	4
WC	(China) C Wang	3	2
(United States) A Krajicek	6	6
LL	(Japan) N Nakagawa	1	4
9	(South Korea) D-h Lee	6	6
3	(Moldova) R Albot	6	6
(Japan) Y Uchiyama	2	1
(Serbia) D Petrović	2	6	6
(Serbia) M Kecmanović	6	1	4
(Chinese Taipei) J Jung	6	7^{7}
Q	(Australia) M Matosevic	4	6^{4}
(France) S Doumbia	6^{6}	2
6	(Australia) A Santillan	7^{8}	6

Second round
1	(Russia) M Youzhny	6	6
(India) P Gunneswaran	2	4
(United States) A Krajicek	7	3	6
9	(South Korea) D-h Lee	5	6	3
3	(Moldova) R Albot	3	6	6
(Serbia) D Petrović	6	3	3
(Chinese Taipei) J Jung	6	1	6
6	(Australia) A Santillan	2	6	3

Quarterfinals
1	(Russia) M Youzhny	6	6
(United States) A Krajicek	1	3
3	(Moldova) R Albot	5	6	7
(Chinese Taipei) J Jung	7	3	5

Semifinals
1	(Russia) M Youzhny	3	2
3	(Moldova) R Albot	6	6

=== Bottom half ===
First round
8	(France) C Hemery	6^{4}	3
Q	(Poland) H Hurkacz	7^{7}	6
(Egypt) M Safwat	6	6
(Russia) T Gabashvili	4	2
WC	(China) Zh Zhang	6	3	5
(South Korea) S-w Kwon	3	6	7
Q	(Italy) R Ghedin	4	3
4	(Canada) P Polansky	6	6
5	(Brazil) T Monteiro	3	4
WC	(China) Y Wu	6	6
LL	(Japan) K Uchida	4	4
(China) Z Li	6	6
(France) S Robert	2	7^{8}	6
(China) D Wu	6	6^{6}	1
WC	(China) R Te	4	3
2	(Slovenia) B Kavčič	6	6

Second round
Q	(Poland) H Hurkacz	6	6
(Egypt) M Safwat	3	2
(South Korea) S-w Kwon	6^{4}	6	4
4	(Canada) P Polansky	7^{7}	3	0^{r}
WC	(China) Y Wu	6	6
(China) Z Li	1	2
(France) S Robert	3	2
2	(Slovenia) B Kavčič	6	6

Quarterfinals
Q	(Poland) H Hurkacz	6	6
(South Korea) S-w Kwon	3	4
WC	(China) Y Wu	6^{1}	6	2
2	(Slovenia) B Kavčič	7^{7}	3	6

Semifinals
Q	(Poland) H Hurkacz	7^{7}	7
2	(Slovenia) B Kavčič	6^{1}	5
