= 2023 Takasaki Open 2 – Singles =

Singles
- 2023 Takasaki Open 2

Final
- Champion: (China) Bai Zhuoxuan
- Runner-up: (China) Yuan Yue
- Score: 6–2, 6–3

Events
Singles	Doubles
Takasaki Open	· 2024 →

This was the first edition of the tournament.

Bai Zhuoxuan won the title, defeating Yuan Yue in the final, 6–2, 6–3.

== Seeds ==
1. (Czech Republic) Linda Fruhvirtová (first round)
2. (China) Wang Yafan (second round)
3. (China) Bai Zhuoxuan (champion)
4. (China) Yuan Yue (final)
5. (Australia) Kimberly Birrell (second round)
6. (Japan) Mai Hontama (semifinals)
7. (Hungary) Dalma Gálfi (first round)
8. (United Kingdom) Harriet Dart (second round, withdrew)

== Draw ==
=== Key ===
- Q = Qualifier
- WC = Wild card
- LL = Lucky loser
- Alt = Alternate
- ITF = ITF entry
- PR = Protected ranking
- SR = Special ranking
- SE = Special exempt
- JE = Junior exempt
- JR = Junior Accelerator Programme entrant
- CO = College Accelerator Programme entrant
- NG = Next Gen Accelerator Program entrant
- w/o = Walkover
- r = Retired
- d = Defaulted

=== Finals ===
Semifinals
(United Kingdom) Lily Miyazaki	5	6	4
4	(China) Yuan Yue	7	3	6
3	(China) Bai Zhuoxuan	6	6
6	(Japan) Mai Hontama	2	4

Final
4	(China) Yuan Yue	2	3
3	(China) Bai Zhuoxuan	6	6

=== Top half ===
First round
1	(Czech Republic) L Fruhvirtová	6	6^{6}	6^{4}
WC	(Japan) A Shimizu	1	7^{8}	7^{7}
(United Kingdom) L Miyazaki	6	6
WC	(Japan) S Ishii	4	2
A Tikhonova	w/o
Q	(Israel) L Glushko
(Japan) H Sakatsume	5	6	5
5	(Australia) K Birrell	7	2	7
4	(China) Y Yuan	6	6
Q	(Japan) M Kobori	3	1
WC	(Japan) S Saito	6	5
(Canada) C Zhao	0	2^{r}
Q	(Japan) A Ito	7^{7}	6
Q	(Japan) H Kaji	6^{3}	2
(South Korea) S-j Jang	6	6
7	(Hungary) D Gálfi	4	1

Second round
WC	(Japan) A Shimizu	6	1	3
(United Kingdom) L Miyazaki	2	6	6
A Tikhonova	6	4	6
5	(Australia) K Birrell	1	6	2
4	(China) Y Yuan	6	7
WC	(Japan) S Saito	3	5
Q	(Japan) A Ito	3	5
(South Korea) S-j Jang	6	7

Quarterfinals
(United Kingdom) L Miyazaki	6	6
A Tikhonova	2	4
4	(China) Y Yuan	6	5	6
(South Korea) S-j Jang	4	7	3

Semifinals
(United Kingdom) L Miyazaki	5	6	4
4	(China) Y Yuan	7	3	6

=== Bottom half ===
First round
8	(United Kingdom) H Dart	6	6
LL	(Thailand) M Sawangkaew	2	1
Q	(Japan) E Shibahara	2	0
WC	(Japan) E Koike	6	6
(China) X You	6	7
Q	(China) H Guo	3	5
Q	(Japan) K Okamura	3	3
3	(China) Z Bai	6	6
6	(Japan) M Hontama	6	6
Q	(Thailand) L Kumkhum	4	3
SR	(Liechtenstein) K von Deichmann	1	4
(Chinese Taipei) Y-y Yang	6	6
P Kudermetova	5	4
(Netherlands) S Lamens	7	6
(Netherlands) A Hartono	6	6^{5}	4
2	(China) Y Wang	4	7^{7}	6

Second round
8	(United Kingdom) H Dart
WC	(Japan) E Koike	w/o
(China) X You	2	2
3	(China) Z Bai	6	6
6	(Japan) M Hontama	7	6
(Chinese Taipei) Y-y Yang	5	3
(Netherlands) S Lamens	6	6
2	(China) Y Wang	3	0

Quarterfinals
WC	(Japan) E Koike	0	7^{7}	2
3	(China) Z Bai	6	6^{4}	6
6	(Japan) M Hontama	6	6
(Netherlands) S Lamens	2	4

Semifinals
3	(China) Z Bai	6	6
6	(Japan) M Hontama	2	4
