= 2018 Shenzhen Longhua Open – Men's singles =

Men's singles
- 2018 Shenzhen Longhua Open

Final
- Champion: (Serbia) Miomir Kecmanović
- Runner-up: (Slovenia) Blaž Kavčič
- Score: 6–2, 2–6, 6–3

Events
Singles	men	women
Doubles	men	women
- Shenzhen Longhua Open

Radu Albot was the defending champion but lost in the first round to Zhang Ze.

Miomir Kecmanović won the title after defeating Blaž Kavčič 6–2, 2–6, 6–3 in the final.

== Seeds ==
1. (Moldova) Radu Albot (first round)
2. (Italy) Thomas Fabbiano (second round)
3. (India) Ramkumar Ramanathan (second round)
4. (India) Prajnesh Gunneswaran (first round)
5. (Serbia) Miomir Kecmanović (champion)
6. (Japan) Yūichi Sugita (second round)
7. (Japan) Go Soeda (first round)
8. (Canada) Filip Peliwo (second round)

== Draw ==
Key

- Q = Qualifier
- WC = Wild card
- LL = Lucky loser
- Alt = Alternate
- ITF = ITF entry
- PR = Protected ranking
- SR = Special ranking
- SE = Special exempt
- JE = Junior exempt
- JR = Junior Accelerator Programme entrant
- CO = College Accelerator Programme entrant
- NG = Next Gen Accelerator Program entrant
- w/o = Walkover
- r = Retired
- d = Defaulted

=== Finals ===
Semifinals
(Kazakhstan) Aleksandr Nedovyesov	5	4
5	(Serbia) Miomir Kecmanović	7	6
(Spain) Alejandro Davidovich Fokina	5	4
(Slovenia) Blaž Kavčič	7	6

Final
5	(Serbia) Miomir Kecmanović	6	2	6
(Slovenia) Blaž Kavčič	2	6	3

=== Top half ===
First round
1	(Moldova) R Albot	4	6	2
(China) Ze Zhang	6	4	6
(China) D Wu	4	4
(United Kingdom) L Broady	6	6
Q	(Portugal) G Oliveira	3	6^{2}
(Kazakhstan) A Nedovyesov	6	7^{7}
(Canada) B Schnur	3	2
6	(Japan) Y Sugita	6	6
3	(India) R Ramanathan	3	6	7^{7}
Q	(India) S Nagal	6	4	6^{2}
WC	(China) Mu Tao	1	3
(Egypt) M Safwat	6	6
(Italy) F Gaio	6	3
(South Korea) D-h Lee	1	0^{r}
(Belgium) K Coppejans	4	3
5	(Serbia) M Kecmanović	6	6

Second round
(China) Ze Zhang	6	1	6
(United Kingdom) L Broady	4	6	1
(Kazakhstan) A Nedovyesov	7^{7}	6
6	(Japan) Y Sugita	6^{4}	4
3	(India) R Ramanathan	6^{3}	4
(Egypt) M Safwat	7^{7}	6
(Italy) F Gaio	6	5	2
5	(Serbia) M Kecmanović	4	7	6

Quarterfinals
(China) Ze Zhang	6^{3}	6^{4}
(Kazakhstan) A Nedovyesov	7^{7}	7^{7}
(Egypt) M Safwat	6	3	6^{4}
5	(Serbia) M Kecmanović	1	6	7^{7}

Semifinals
(Kazakhstan) A Nedovyesov	5	4
5	(Serbia) M Kecmanović	7	6

=== Bottom half ===
First round
8	(Canada) F Peliwo	6	7^{7}
WC	(China) R Te	3	6^{4}
Q	(India) S Mukund	7^{7}	6
WC	(China) Y Wu	6^{4}	2
(South Korea) S-w Kwon	5	3
(Chinese Taipei) T-h Yang	7	6
(Spain) A Davidovich Fokina	6	6
4	(India) P Gunneswaran	3	4
7	(Japan) G Soeda	3	3
(Slovenia) B Kavčič	6	6
(France) J Tatlot	6	0
Q	(India) S Myneni	0	0^{r}
(Hungary) M Valkusz	6	6
(China) Z Li	2	2
WC	(China) Xia Zihao	3	2
2	(Italy) T Fabbiano	6	6

Second round
8	(Canada) F Peliwo	4	7	3
Q	(India) S Mukund	6	5	6
(Chinese Taipei) T-h Yang	7^{7}	4	2
(Spain) A Davidovich Fokina	6^{1}	6	6
(Slovenia) B Kavčič	6	6
(France) J Tatlot	1	2
(Hungary) M Valkusz	7^{7}	7
2	(Italy) T Fabbiano	6^{5}	5

Quarterfinals
Q	(India) S Mukund	4	2
(Spain) A Davidovich Fokina	6	6
(Slovenia) B Kavčič	6	0
(Hungary) M Valkusz	2	0^{r}

Semifinals
(Spain) A Davidovich Fokina	5	4
(Slovenia) B Kavčič	7	6
