= 2023 Shenzhen Longhua Open =

- Date: 10–15 October (men); 16–22 October (women)
- Edition: 5th (women); 4th (men)
- Category: ATP Challenger Tour; ITF Women's Circuit
- Surface: Hard
- Location: Shenzhen, China

Champions

Men's singles
- (United States) Aleksandar Kovacevic

Women's singles
- (China) Bai Zhuoxuan

Men's doubles
- (Austria) Alexander Erler / (Austria) Lucas Miedler

Women's doubles
- (France) Kristina Mladenovic / (Japan) Moyuka Uchijima
← 2019 ·	Shenzhen Longhua Open	· 2024 →

The 2023 Shenzhen Longhua Open was a professional tennis tournament played on hard courts. It was the fourth (men) and fifth (women) editions of the tournament which was part of the 2023 ATP Challenger Tour and the 2023 ITF Women's World Tennis Tour. It took place in Shenzhen, China between 10 and 22 October 2023.

== Men's singles main-draw entrants ==
=== Seeds ===
Country	Player	Rank^{1}	Seed
AUS	Thanasi Kokkinakis	69	1
ARG	Pedro Cachin	71	2
POR	Nuno Borges	85	3
ITA	Fabio Fognini	128	4
AUS	James Duckworth	139	5
USA	Aleksandar Kovacevic	146	6
FRA	Térence Atmane	148	7
TPE	Hsu Yu-hsiou	184	8

- ^{1} Rankings are as of 25 September 2023.

=== Other entrants ===
The following players received wildcards into the singles main draw:

- (Italy) Fabio Fognini
- (China) Sun Qian
- (China) Tang Sheng

The following players received entry from the qualifying draw:

- (China) Bai Yan
- (China) Cui Jie
- Egor Gerasimov
- (China) Li Zhe
- (Northern Mariana Islands) Colin Sinclair
- (China) Te Rigele

== Women's singles main-draw entrants ==
=== Seeds ===
Country	Player	Rank^{1}	Seed
CHN	Bai Zhuoxuan	117	1
CHN	Yuan Yue	128	2
HUN	Tímea Babos	181	3
JPN	Moyuka Uchijima	182	4
FRA	Kristina Mladenovic	214	5
CAN	Carol Zhao	230	6
HKG	Eudice Chong	242	7
THA	Lanlana Tararudee	252	8

- ^{1} Rankings are as of 9 October 2023

=== Other entrants ===
The following players received wildcards into the singles main draw:

- (China) Mi Tianmi
- (China) Tang Qianhui
- (China) Wang Meiling
- (China) Zhang Ying

The following players received entry from the qualifying draw:

- (Chinese Taipei) Cho I-hsuan
- (Chinese Taipei) Cho Yi-tsen
- (China) Guo Meiqi
- Anastasiia Gureva
- (China) Ren Yufei
- (Belgium) Clara Vlasselaer
- (Hong Kong) Wu Ho-ching
- (China) Yang Yidi

== Champions ==
=== Men's singles ===
- (United States) Aleksandar Kovacevic def. (Portugal) Nuno Borges 7–6^{(7–4)}, 7–6^{(7–5)}.

=== Women's singles ===
- (China) Bai Zhuoxuan def. (China) Yuan Yue 7–6^{(7–5)}, 6–2.

=== Men's doubles ===
- (Austria) Alexander Erler / (Austria) Lucas Miedler def. (Poland) Piotr Matuszewski / (Australia) Matthew Romios 6–3, 6–4.

=== Women's doubles ===
- (France) Kristina Mladenovic / (Japan) Moyuka Uchijima def. (Hungary) Tímea Babos / (Ukraine) Kateryna Volodko, 6–2, 7–5
