= 2016 ITF Women's Circuit – Shenzhen Longhua – Singles =

Shenzhen Longhua – Singles
- 2016 ITF Women's Circuit – Shenzhen Longhua

Final
- Champion: (China) Peng Shuai
- Runner-up: (Romania) Patricia Maria Țig
- Score: 3–6, 7–5, 6–4

Events
Singles	Doubles
ITF Women's Circuit – Shenzhen Longhua	· 2017 →

This was the first edition of the tournament.

Peng Shuai won the inaugural title, defeating Patricia Maria Țig in the final, 3–6, 7–5, 6–4.

== Seeds ==
1. (China) Wang Qiang (quarterfinals; retired)
2. (China) Duan Yingying (first round)
3. (China) Han Xinyun (first round)
4. (China) Peng Shuai (champion)
5. (Romania) Patricia Maria Țig (final)
6. (China) Zhu Lin (semifinals)
7. (Serbia) Nina Stojanović (quarterfinals)
8. (South Korea) Jang Su-jeong (second round)

== Main draw ==
=== Key ===
- Q = Qualifier
- WC = Wild card
- LL = Lucky loser
- Alt = Alternate
- SE = Special exempt
- PR = Protected ranking
- ITF = ITF entry
- JE = Junior exempt
- w/o = Walkover
- r = Retired
- d = Defaulted
- SR = Special ranking

=== Finals ===
Semifinals
(China) Liu Fangzhou	2	2
4	(China) Peng Shuai	6	6
5	(Romania) Patricia Maria Țig	6	2	6
6	(China) Zhu Lin	4	6	3

Final
4	(China) Peng Shuai	3	7	6
5	(Romania) Patricia Maria Țig	6	5	4

=== Top half ===
First round
1	(China) Q Wang	6	6
(Bulgaria) A Naydenova	0	4
(China) F Xun	2	6	6
(Norway) M Stokke	6	1	3
(China) F Liu	6	6
(Poland) K Piter	3	4
WC	(China) Xin Wang	1	3
8	(South Korea) S-j Jang	6	6
4	(China) S Peng	6	6
(Uzbekistan) S Sharipova	0	4
(Georgia (country)) S Shapatava	1	0
(China) C Liu	6	6
(Czech Republic) T Martincová	5	3
(United States) L Albanese	7	6
PR	(Croatia) T Mrdeža	1	2
7	(Serbia) N Stojanović	6	6

Second round
1	(China) Q Wang	6	6
(China) F Xun	1	3
(China) F Liu	7	7^{9}
8	(South Korea) S-j Jang	5	6^{7}
4	(China) S Peng	6	6
(China) C Liu	0	0
(United States) L Albanese	1	3
7	(Serbia) N Stojanović	6	6

Quarterfinals
1	(China) Q Wang	6	0^{r}
(China) F Liu	4	1
4	(China) S Peng	2	6	7^{7}
7	(Serbia) N Stojanović	6	4	6^{4}

Semifinals
(China) F Liu	2	2
4	(China) S Peng	6	6

=== Bottom half ===
First round
5	(Romania) PM Țig	6	6
(China) X Gao	1	0
Q	(Slovakia) Z Zlochová	7^{7}	6^{5}	7^{7}
Q	(China) H Tang	6^{5}	7^{7}	6^{5}
(China) Z Yang	5	6	7
(China) J Lu	7	4	5
WC	(China) Y Xu	7	1	6
3	(China) X Han	5	6	3
6	(China) L Zhu	6	6
WC	(China) C Liang	4	3
(South Korea) N-l Han	7	1	7
WC	(China) Xiy Wang	5	6	5
Q	(China) Z Sun	6	2	2
Q	(China) H Guo	1	6	6
(United States) J Cako	6	6
2	(China) Y Duan	4	2

Second round
5	(Romania) PM Țig	6	6
Q	(Slovakia) Z Zlochová	0	0
(China) Z Yang	4	6	3
WC	(China) Y Xu	6	0	6
6	(China) L Zhu	7	6
(South Korea) N-l Han	5	1
Q	(China) H Guo	2	5
(United States) J Cako	6	7

Quarterfinals
5	(Romania) PM Țig	6	6
WC	(China) Y Xu	4	1
6	(China) L Zhu	4	6	6
(United States) J Cako	6	2	2

Semifinals
5	(Romania) PM Țig	6	2	6
6	(China) L Zhu	4	6	3
