= 2019 Shenzhen Longhua Open – Women's singles =

Women's singles
- 2019 Shenzhen Longhua Open

Final
- Champion: (China) Zhu Lin
- Runner-up: (China) Peng Shuai
- Score: 6–3, 1–3, ret.

Events
Singles	men	women
Doubles	men	women
← 2018 ·	Shenzhen Longhua Open	· 2023 →

Ivana Jorović was the defending champion, but chose not to participate.

Zhu Lin won the title after Peng Shuai retired at 6–3, 1–3 in the final.

== Seeds ==
1. (China) Peng Shuai (final, retired)
2. (China) Zhu Lin (champion)
3. (Japan) Nao Hibino (second round)
4. (Serbia) Nina Stojanović (quarterfinals)
5. (Hungary) Tímea Babos (quarterfinals)
6. (Montenegro) Danka Kovinić (quarterfinals)
7. (Italy) Jasmine Paolini (semifinals)
8. (Slovenia) Kaja Juvan (first round)

== Draw ==
=== Key ===
- Q = Qualifier
- WC = Wild card
- LL = Lucky loser
- Alt = Alternate
- SE = Special exempt
- PR = Protected ranking
- ITF = ITF entry
- JE = Junior exempt
- w/o = Walkover
- r = Retired
- d = Defaulted
- SR = Special ranking

=== Finals ===
Semifinals
1	(China) Peng Shuai	6	6
7	(Italy) Jasmine Paolini	3	3
(Japan) Kurumi Nara	3	5
2	(China) Zhu Lin	6	7

Final
1	(China) Peng Shuai	3	3^{r}
2	(China) Zhu Lin	6	1

=== Top half ===
First round
1	(China) S Peng	6	6
Q	(Ukraine) D Snigur	4	2
(Georgia (country)) M Bolkvadze	1	3
(Slovenia) D Jakupović	6	6
Q	(China) F Xun	3	6	6
(India) A Raina	6	1	0
(Bulgaria) V Tomova	5	1
6	(Montenegro) D Kovinić	7	6
4	(Serbia) N Stojanović	6	6
Q	(Thailand) P Plipuech	1	1
WC	(China) C Liu	6	6
Q	(Georgia (country)) S Shapatava	1	1
SE	(Australia) Ar Rodionova	4	0
Q	(Poland) U Radwańska	6	6
Q	(China) X You	5	1
7	(Italy) J Paolini	7	6

Second round
1	(China) S Peng	6	6
(Slovenia) D Jakupović	1	0
Q	(China) F Xun	5	4
6	(Montenegro) D Kovinić	7	6
4	(Serbia) N Stojanović	6	6
WC	(China) C Liu	1	4
Q	(Poland) U Radwańska	2	4
7	(Italy) J Paolini	6	6

Quarterfinals
1	(China) S Peng	6	6
6	(Montenegro) D Kovinić	2	0
4	(Serbia) N Stojanović	7^{7}	4	1
7	(Italy) J Paolini	6^{3}	6	6

Semifinals
1	(China) S Peng	6	6
7	(Italy) J Paolini	3	3

=== Bottom half ===
First round
8	(Slovenia) K Juvan	2	6	2
(Serbia) N Kostić	6	3	6
Q	(Japan) C Muramatsu	2	4
(Japan) K Nara	6	6
(China) Xin Wang	3	6^{5}
(Slovakia) J Čepelová	6	7^{7}
WC	(China) W Zheng	4	1
3	(Japan) N Hibino	6	6
5	(Hungary) T Babos	6	6
WC	(China) D Wang	1	4
WC	(China) Yi Zhang	3	6	2
(Netherlands) B Schoofs	6	3	6
(South Korea) N-l Han	6	6
Q	(China) F Liu	2	4
(Russia) V Savinykh	3	0
2	(China) L Zhu	6	6

Second round
(Serbia) N Kostić	2	4
(Japan) K Nara	6	6
(Slovakia) J Čepelová	6	6
3	(Japan) N Hibino	2	3
5	(Hungary) T Babos	6	2	6
(Netherlands) B Schoofs	2	6	0
(South Korea) N-l Han	6	4	3
2	(China) L Zhu	1	6	6

Quarterfinals
(Japan) K Nara	7^{9}	7^{7}
(Slovakia) J Čepelová	6^{7}	6^{5}
5	(Hungary) T Babos	2	2
2	(China) L Zhu	6	6

Semifinals
(Japan) K Nara	3	5
2	(China) L Zhu	6	7
