= 2023 Takasaki Open 2 – Doubles =

Doubles
- 2023 Takasaki Open 2

Final
- Champion: (Thailand) Luksika Kumkhum (Thailand) Peangtarn Plipuech
- Runner-up: (Chinese Taipei) Liang En-shuo (Chinese Taipei) Wu Fang-hsien
- Score: 6–3, 6–1

Events
Singles	Doubles
Takasaki Open	· 2024 →

This was the first edition of the tournament.

Luksika Kumkhum and Peangtarn Plipuech won the title, defeating Liang En-shuo and Wu Fang-hsien in the final, 6–3, 6–1.

== Seeds ==
1. (Japan) Eri Hozumi / (Japan) Makoto Ninomiya (quarterfinals)
2. (China) Guo Hanyu / (China) Jiang Xinyu (semifinals)
3. (Chinese Taipei) Liang En-shuo / (Chinese Taipei) Wu Fang-hsien (final)
4. (Thailand) Luksika Kumkhum / (Thailand) Peangtarn Plipuech (champions)

== Draw ==
Key

- Q = Qualifier
- WC = Wild card
- LL = Lucky loser
- Alt = Alternate
- ITF = ITF entry
- PR = Protected ranking
- SR = Special ranking
- SE = Special exempt
- JE = Junior exempt
- JR = Junior Accelerator Programme entrant
- CO = College Accelerator Programme entrant
- NG = Next Gen Accelerator Program entrant
- w/o = Walkover
- r = Retired
- d = Defaulted

=== Draw ===
First round
1	(Japan) E Hozumi (Japan) M Ninomiya	7^{7}	6
(China) Q Tang (Chinese Taipei) C-y Tsao	6^{3}	3
WC	(Chinese Taipei) Y-y Li (Japan) R Okuwaki	6^{5}	2
(Netherlands) S Lamens; A Tikhonova	7^{7}	6
4	(Thailand) L Kumkhum (Thailand) P Plipuech	6	6
WC	(Japan) N Katsumi (Japan) H Sato	1	3
(Japan) M Kobori (Japan) A Shimizu	6	1	[4]
(Hong Kong) E Chong (Japan) N Kawaguchi	2	6	[10]
(South Korea) N-l Han (South Korea) S-j Jang	6	7
(Japan) A Ito (Japan) K Morisaki	2	5
WC	(Japan) H Kinoshita (Japan) E Koike	5	3
3	(Chinese Taipei) E-s Liang (Chinese Taipei) F-h Wu	7	6
A Falei; K Zaytseva	3	4
(Japan) S Saito (Japan) E Shibahara	6	6
Alt	(China) Y Dang (China) X You	3	6^{7}
2	(China) H Guo (China) X Jiang	6	7^{9}

Quarterfinals
1	(Japan) E Hozumi (Japan) M Ninomiya	6^{2}	2
(Netherlands) S Lamens; A Tikhonova	7^{7}	6
4	(Thailand) L Kumkhum (Thailand) P Plipuech	6	6
(Hong Kong) E Chong (Japan) N Kawaguchi	3	3
(South Korea) N-l Han (South Korea) S-j Jang	7^{7}	4	[10]
3	(Chinese Taipei) E-s Liang (Chinese Taipei) F-h Wu	6^{2}	6	[12]
(Japan) S Saito (Japan) E Shibahara	1	6	[10]
2	(China) H Guo (China) X Jiang	6	3	[12]

Semifinals
(Netherlands) S Lamens; A Tikhonova	1	3
4	(Thailand) L Kumkhum (Thailand) P Plipuech	6	6
3	(Chinese Taipei) E-s Liang (Chinese Taipei) F-h Wu	6	7^{9}
2	(China) H Guo (China) X Jiang	2	6^{7}

Final
4	(Thailand) L Kumkhum (Thailand) P Plipuech	6	6
3	(Chinese Taipei) E-s Liang (Chinese Taipei) F-h Wu	3	1
