= 2023 Shenzhen Longhua Open – Women's doubles =

Women's doubles
- 2023 Shenzhen Longhua Open

Final
- Champions: (France) Kristina Mladenovic (Japan) Moyuka Uchijima
- Runners-up: (Hungary) Tímea Babos (Ukraine) Kateryna Volodko
- Score: 6–2, 7–5

Events
Singles	men	women
Doubles	men	women
← 2019 ·	Shenzhen Longhua Open	· 2024 →

Nao Hibino and Makoto Ninomiya were the defending champions from when the tournament was last held in 2019, but both chose to compete at the 2023 Jiangxi Open instead.

Kristina Mladenovic and Moyuka Uchijima won the title, defeating Tímea Babos and Kateryna Volodko in the final, 6–2, 7–5.

== Seeds ==
1. (France) Kristina Mladenovic / (Japan) Moyuka Uchijima (champions)
2. (Hungary) Tímea Babos / (Ukraine) Kateryna Volodko (final)
3. (Chinese Taipei) Liang En-shuo / (China) Tang Qianhui (semifinals)
4. (Indonesia) Beatrice Gumulya / (South Korea) Park So-hyun (quarterfinals)

== Draw ==
=== Key ===
- Q = Qualifier
- WC = Wild card
- LL = Lucky loser
- Alt = Alternate
- SE = Special exempt
- PR = Protected ranking
- ITF = ITF entry
- JE = Junior exempt
- w/o = Walkover
- r = Retired
- d = Defaulted
- SR = Special ranking

=== Draw ===
First round
1	(France) K Mladenovic (Japan) M Uchijima	6	6
(China) M Guo (China) M Wang	3	1
(China) F Liu (China) X Yao	6	3	[3]
(China) Y Sun (China) R Zhang	0	6	[10]
4	(Indonesia) B Gumulya (South Korea) S-h Park	7^{7}	6
(Chinese Taipei) I-h Cho (Chinese Taipei) Y-t Cho	6^{4}	2
(China) M Chen (China) N Dong	3	1
(Hong Kong) H-c Wu (China) Y Yang	6	6
(Thailand) M Sawangkaew (Thailand) L Tararudee	6	2	[10]
A Gureva; S Lansere	4	6	[5]
A Kovaleva (Belgium) C Vlasselaer	2	2
3	(Chinese Taipei) E-s Liang (China) Q Tang	6	6
(China) L Liu (China) J Zhang	4	6^{4}
(Georgia (country)) S Shapatava (Turkey) I Yörük	6	7^{7}
(China) Y Ren (China) C Yuan	3	6	[2]
2	(Hungary) T Babos (Ukraine) K Volodko	6	2	[10]

Quarterfinals
1	(France) K Mladenovic (Japan) M Uchijima	6	6
(China) Y Sun (China) R Zhang	1	2
4	(Indonesia) B Gumulya (South Korea) S-h Park	3	6	[5]
(Hong Kong) H-c Wu (China) Y Yang	6	1	[10]
(Thailand) M Sawangkaew (Thailand) L Tararudee	2	3
3	(Chinese Taipei) E-s Liang (China) Q Tang	6	6
(Georgia (country)) S Shapatava (Turkey) I Yörük	0	3
2	(Hungary) T Babos (Ukraine) K Volodko	6	6

Semifinals
1	(France) K Mladenovic (Japan) M Uchijima	6	6
(Hong Kong) H-c Wu (China) Y Yang	4	2
3	(Chinese Taipei) E-s Liang (China) Q Tang	7^{7}	3	[5]
2	(Hungary) T Babos (Ukraine) K Volodko	6^{5}	6	[10]

Final
1	(France) K Mladenovic (Japan) M Uchijima	6	7
2	(Hungary) T Babos (Ukraine) K Volodko	2	5
