= 2019 Shenzhen Longhua Open – Men's singles =

Men's singles
- 2019 Shenzhen Longhua Open

Final
- Champion: (China) Zhang Zhizhen
- Runner-up: (China) Li Zhe
- Score: 6–3, 4–6, 6–1

Events
Singles	men	women
Doubles	men	women
- Shenzhen Longhua Open

Miomir Kecmanović was the defending champion but chose not to defend his title.

Zhang Zhizhen won the title after defeating Li Zhe 6–3, 4–6, 6–1 in the final.

== Seeds ==
All seeds receive a bye into the second round.

1. (South Korea) Kwon Soon-woo (third round)
2. (Spain) Alejandro Davidovich Fokina (withdrew)
3. (Japan) Yūichi Sugita (third round)
4. (Japan) Go Soeda (quarterfinals)
5. (Chinese Taipei) Jason Jung (quarterfinals)
6. (Canada) Steven Diez (second round)
7. (Tunisia) Malek Jaziri (second round, retired)
8. (China) Zhang Zhizhen (champion)
9. (Spain) Enrique López Pérez (third round)
10. (India) Ramkumar Ramanathan (second round)
11. (Serbia) Danilo Petrović (withdrew)
12. (United States) Christopher Eubanks (second round)
13. (Portugal) Frederico Ferreira Silva (semifinals, retired)
14. (Uzbekistan) Denis Istomin (second round, retired)
15. (Egypt) Mohamed Safwat (semifinals)
16. (China) Bai Yan (third round)

== Draw ==
Key

- Q = Qualifier
- WC = Wild card
- LL = Lucky loser
- Alt = Alternate
- ITF = ITF entry
- PR = Protected ranking
- SR = Special ranking
- SE = Special exempt
- JE = Junior exempt
- JR = Junior Accelerator Programme entrant
- CO = College Accelerator Programme entrant
- NG = Next Gen Accelerator Program entrant
- w/o = Walkover
- r = Retired
- d = Defaulted

=== Finals ===
Quarterfinals
15	(Egypt) Mohamed Safwat	7	6
(Kazakhstan) Denis Yevseyev	5	2
(Russia) Roman Safiullin	7^{7}	1	5
(China) Li Zhe	6^{5}	6	7
8	(China) Zhang Zhizhen	7^{7}	6
4	(Japan) Go Soeda	6^{0}	4
5	(Chinese Taipei) Jason Jung	6^{5}	6	4
13	(Portugal) Frederico Ferreira Silva	7^{7}	4	6

Semifinals
15	(Egypt) Mohamed Safwat	4	2
(China) Li Zhe	6	6
8	(China) Zhang Zhizhen	6	4
13	(Portugal) Frederico Ferreira Silva	1	1^{r}

Final
(China) Li Zhe	3	6	1
8	(China) Zhang Zhizhen	6	4	6

=== Top half ===
==== Section 1 ====
First round
(Japan) K Uchida	5	1
(South Korea) D-h Lee	7	6
(France) S Doumbia	3	3
(Russia) I Nedelko	6	6
(Russia) T Gabashvili	6	6
WC	(China) Li Yuanfeng	3	2
(Kazakhstan) D Yevseyev	6	6
WC	(China) C Wang	0	1

Second round
1	(South Korea) S-w Kwon	6	6
(South Korea) D-h Lee	2	2
(Russia) I Nedelko	6^{3}	1
15	(Egypt) M Safwat	7^{7}	6
12	(United States) C Eubanks	5	2
(Russia) T Gabashvili	7	6
(Kazakhstan) D Yevseyev	6	6
6	(Canada) S Diez	3	2

Third round
1	(South Korea) S-w Kwon	4	6^{6}
15	(Egypt) M Safwat	6	7^{8}
(Russia) T Gabashvili	4	7	6^{4}
(Kazakhstan) D Yevseyev	6	5	7^{7}

Quarterfinals
15	(Egypt) M Safwat	7	6
(Kazakhstan) D Yevseyev	5	2

==== Section 2 ====
First round
(China) F Sun	6	6
LL	(Croatia) M Sabanov	4	4
(Ukraine) D Kalenichenko	6^{0}	4
(Russia) R Safiullin	7^{7}	6
(South Korea) Y-s Chung	4	3
Alt	(Czech Republic) J Forejtek	6	6
(South Korea) J-s Nam	2	1
(China) Z Li	6	6

Second round
3	(Japan) Y Sugita	7	6
(China) F Sun	5	2
(Russia) R Safiullin	4	7	2
14	(Uzbekistan) D Istomin	6	5	0^{r}
9	(Spain) E López Pérez	6	6
Alt	(Czech Republic) J Forejtek	1	4
(China) Z Li	4	6	5
7	(Tunisia) M Jaziri	6	4	0^{r}

Third round
3	(Japan) Y Sugita	6	5	3
(Russia) R Safiullin	2	7	6
9	(Spain) E López Pérez	3	3
(China) Z Li	6	6

Quarterfinals
(Russia) R Safiullin	7^{7}	1	5
(China) Z Li	6^{5}	6	7

=== Bottom half ===
==== Section 3 ====
First round
WC	(China) J Cui	7^{8}	1	4
(Portugal) G Oliveira	6^{6}	6	6
(Croatia) B Gojo	6	7^{7}
(Netherlands) T van Rijthoven	3	6^{5}
(Uzbekistan) K Sultanov	6	6
(India) Sidharth Rawat	2	2
WC	(China) Y Mo	4	0
(Russia) K Kravchuk	6	6

Second round
8	(China) Zh Zhang	6	6
(Portugal) G Oliveira	0	1
(Croatia) B Gojo	7^{7}	7^{9}
Q	(France) F Reboul	6^{5}	6^{7}
16	(China) Y Bai	6	7
(Uzbekistan) K Sultanov	3	5
(Russia) K Kravchuk	7^{7}	4	5
4	(Japan) G Soeda	6^{4}	6	7

Third round
8	(China) Zh Zhang	6	2
(Croatia) B Gojo	2	1^{r}
16	(China) Y Bai	6	3	3
4	(Japan) G Soeda	4	6	6

Quarterfinals
8	(China) Zh Zhang	7^{7}	6
4	(Japan) G Soeda	6^{0}	4

==== Section 4 ====
First round
(Brazil) B Sant'Anna	6	6
WC	(China) X Gao	4	2
(Chinese Taipei) T-l Wu	6	7
PR	(Colombia) N Barrientos	3	5
Q	(China) Duan Jiaqi	3	1
(Chinese Taipei) T-h Yang	6	6
(China) D Wu	1	7^{9}	3
(Chinese Taipei) C-h Tseng	6	6^{7}	6

Second round
5	(Chinese Taipei) J Jung	6	6
(Brazil) B Sant'Anna	4	3
(Chinese Taipei) T-l Wu	6	7^{8}
10	(India) R Ramanathan	3	6^{6}
13	(Portugal) F Ferreira Silva	6	6
(Chinese Taipei) T-h Yang	3	0
(Chinese Taipei) C-h Tseng	7^{7}	2
LL	(Japan) T Matsui	6^{3}	1^{r}

Third round
5	(Chinese Taipei) J Jung	7^{7}	6
(Chinese Taipei) T-l Wu	6^{2}	4
13	(Portugal) F Ferreira Silva	6^{5}	6	6
(Chinese Taipei) C-h Tseng	7^{7}	3	4

Quarterfinals
5	(Chinese Taipei) J Jung	6^{5}	6	4
13	(Portugal) F Ferreira Silva	7^{7}	4	6
