= 2017 Shenzhen Open =

2017 Shenzhen Open may refer to:

- 2017 ATP Shenzhen Open, an ATP World Tour tennis tournament
- 2017 WTA Shenzhen Open, a WTA Tour tennis tournament

== See also ==
- 2017 Shenzhen Open – singles (disambiguation)
- 2017 Shenzhen Open – doubles (disambiguation)
