= 2018 Shenzhen Longhua Open – Men's doubles =

Men's doubles
- 2018 Shenzhen Longhua Open

Final
- Champions: (Chinese Taipei) Hsieh Cheng-peng (Indonesia) Christopher Rungkat
- Runners-up: (India) Sriram Balaji (India) Jeevan Nedunchezhiyan
- Score: 6–4, 6–2

Events
Singles	men	women
Doubles	men	women
- Shenzhen Longhua Open

Sriram Balaji and Vishnu Vardhan were the defending champions but only Balaji chose to defend his title, partnering Jeevan Nedunchezhiyan. Balaji lost in the final to Hsieh Cheng-peng and Christopher Rungkat.

Hsieh and Rungkat won the title after defeating Balaji and Nedunchezhiyan 6–4, 6–2 in the final.

== Seeds ==
1. (India) Sriram Balaji / (India) Jeevan Nedunchezhiyan (final)
2. (Chinese Taipei) Hsieh Cheng-peng / (Indonesia) Christopher Rungkat (champions)
3. (China) Gong Maoxin / (China) Zhang Ze (first round)
4. (Chinese Taipei) Peng Hsien-yin / (Thailand) Sonchat Ratiwatana (quarterfinals)

== Draw ==
Key

- Q = Qualifier
- WC = Wild card
- LL = Lucky loser
- Alt = Alternate
- ITF = ITF entry
- PR = Protected ranking
- SR = Special ranking
- SE = Special exempt
- JE = Junior exempt
- JR = Junior Accelerator Programme entrant
- CO = College Accelerator Programme entrant
- NG = Next Gen Accelerator Program entrant
- w/o = Walkover
- r = Retired
- d = Defaulted

First round
1	(India) S Balaji (India) J Nedunchezhiyan	7	2	[10]
(Kazakhstan) A Nedovyesov (Egypt) M Safwat	5	6	[7]
(Russia) A Pavlioutchenkov (Chinese Taipei) T-h Yang	6^{3}	2
(Serbia) M Kecmanović (China) Z Li	7^{7}	6
4	(Chinese Taipei) H-y Peng (Thailand) So Ratiwatana	6	6
(Croatia) M Sabanov (Japan) Y Sugita	4	3
(India) A Kadhe (Thailand) Sa Ratiwatana	6	6
(Russia) M Elgin (Belarus) Y Shyla	3	4
WC	(China) A Wang (China) Xia Zihao	3	2
WC	(China) R Te (China) D Wu	6	6
(India) S Myneni (India) R Ramanathan	6	3	[10]
3	(China) M Gong (China) Ze Zhang	3	6	[8]
(Portugal) G Oliveira (Croatia) I Sabanov	6	6
WC	(China) X Gao (China) F Sun	2	4
(Belgium) K Coppejans (Canada) F Peliwo	1	2
2	(Chinese Taipei) C-p Hsieh (Indonesia) C Rungkat	6	6

Quarterfinals
1	(India) S Balaji (India) J Nedunchezhiyan	7^{7}	6
(Serbia) M Kecmanović (China) Z Li	6^{4}	3
4	(Chinese Taipei) H-y Peng (Thailand) So Ratiwatana	7^{9}	5	[2]
(India) A Kadhe (Thailand) Sa Ratiwatana	6^{7}	7	[10]
WC	(China) R Te (China) D Wu	4	3
(India) S Myneni (India) R Ramanathan	6	6
(Portugal) G Oliveira (Croatia) I Sabanov	5	7	[8]
2	(Chinese Taipei) C-p Hsieh (Indonesia) C Rungkat	7	5	[10]

Semifinals
1	(India) S Balaji (India) J Nedunchezhiyan	6^{4}	6	[10]
(India) A Kadhe (Thailand) Sa Ratiwatana	7^{7}	4	[6]
(India) S Myneni (India) R Ramanathan	4	4
2	(Chinese Taipei) C-p Hsieh (Indonesia) C Rungkat	6	6

Final
1	(India) S Balaji (India) J Nedunchezhiyan	4	2
2	(Chinese Taipei) C-p Hsieh (Indonesia) C Rungkat	6	6
