= 2016 ITF Women's Circuit – Shenzhen Longhua – Doubles =

Shenzhen Longhua – Doubles
- 2016 ITF Women's Circuit – Shenzhen Longhua

Final
- Champions: (Serbia) Nina Stojanović (China) You Xiaodi
- Runners-up: (China) Han Xinyun (China) Zhu Lin
- Score: 6–4, 7–6^{(8–6)}

Events
Singles	Doubles
ITF Women's Circuit – Shenzhen Longhua	· 2017 →

This was the first edition of the tournament.

Nina Stojanović and You Xiaodi won the inaugural title, defeating Han Xinyun and Zhu Lin in the final, 6–4, 7–6^{(8–6)}.

== Seeds ==
1. (China) Han Xinyun / (China) Zhu Lin (final)
2. (Bulgaria) Aleksandrina Naydenova / (Romania) Patricia Maria Țig (first round)
3. (Serbia) Nina Stojanović / (China) You Xiaodi (champions)
4. (China) Liu Chang / (China) Lu Jiajing (quarterfinals)

== Draw ==
=== Key ===
- Q = Qualifier
- WC = Wild card
- LL = Lucky loser
- Alt = Alternate
- SE = Special exempt
- PR = Protected ranking
- ITF = ITF entry
- JE = Junior exempt
- w/o = Walkover
- r = Retired
- d = Defaulted
- SR = Special ranking

First round
1	(China) X Han (China) L Zhu	6	6
(China) C Liang (China) Q Wang	4	2
(United States) J Cako (Uzbekistan) S Sharipova	7	5	[10]
(South Korea) N-l Han (South Korea) S-j Jang	5	7	[12]
4	(China) C Liu (China) J Lu	6	6
(China) H Tang (China) Yu Zhang	4	0
(China) Y Duan (China) F Liu	7	6^{4}	[10]
(Russia) A Gabueva (Georgia (country)) S Shapatava	5	7^{7}	[6]
(China) Y Wang (China) F Xun	7^{7}	6
WC	(China) S Ma (China) Xin Wang	6^{2}	2
(China) X Gao (China) Y Li	3	7	[12]
3	(Serbia) N Stojanović (China) X You	6	5	[14]
(China) A Gai (China) S Guo	6^{2}	6^{7}
(China) X Sun (China) Z Sun	7^{7}	7^{9}
WC	(China) Xiy Wang (China) Yi Zhang	6	6
2	(Bulgaria) A Naydenova (Romania) PM Țig	3	4

Quarterfinals
1	(China) X Han (China) L Zhu	6	6
(South Korea) N-l Han (South Korea) S-j Jang	2	2
4	(China) C Liu (China) J Lu	4	7	[7]
(China) Y Duan (China) F Liu	6	5	[10]
(China) Y Wang (China) F Xun	4	6	[8]
3	(Serbia) N Stojanović (China) X You	6	2	[10]
(China) X Sun (China) Z Sun	2	4
WC	(China) Xiy Wang (China) Yi Zhang	6	6

Semifinals
1	(China) X Han (China) L Zhu	6	6
(China) Y Duan (China) F Liu	1	3
3	(Serbia) N Stojanović (China) X You	6	7^{8}
WC	(China) Xiy Wang (China) Yi Zhang	4	6^{6}

Final
1	(China) X Han (China) L Zhu	4	6^{6}
3	(Serbia) N Stojanović (China) X You	6	7^{8}
