= 2018 Shenzhen Longhua Open – Women's doubles =

Akash bohra

Women's doubles
- 2018 Shenzhen Longhua Open

Final
- Champions: (Japan) Shuko Aoyama (China) Yang Zhaoxuan
- Runners-up: (South Korea) Choi Ji-hee (Thailand) Luksika Kumkhum
- Score: 6–2, 6–3

Events
Singles	men	women
Doubles	men	women
← 2017 ·	Shenzhen Longhua Open	· 2019 →

Jacqueline Cako and Nina Stojanović were the defending champions, but both players chose not to participate.

Shuko Aoyama and Yang Zhaoxuan won the title, defeating Choi Ji-hee and Luksika Kumkhum in the final, 6–2, 6–3.

== Seeds ==
1. (Japan) Shuko Aoyama / (China) Yang Zhaoxuan (champions)
2. (Japan) Nao Hibino / (Georgia (country)) Oksana Kalashnikova (semifinals)
3. (Japan) Eri Hozumi / (Montenegro) Danka Kovinić (first round)
4. (China) Jiang Xinyu / (China) Tang Qianhui (first round)

== Draw ==
=== Key ===
- Q = Qualifier
- WC = Wild card
- LL = Lucky loser
- Alt = Alternate
- SE = Special exempt
- PR = Protected ranking
- ITF = ITF entry
- JE = Junior exempt
- w/o = Walkover
- r = Retired
- d = Defaulted
- SR = Special ranking

=== Draw ===
First round
1	(Japan) S Aoyama (China) Z Yang	6	6
(Russia) O Doroshina (Russia) N Dzalamidze	2	2
(Japan) M Doi (Japan) M Imanishi	6	7
(Japan) H Kuwata (Japan) J Namigata	4	5
3	(Japan) E Hozumi (Montenegro) D Kovinić	6	5	[8]
(China) X Han (China) Xin Wang	4	7	[10]
(South Korea) N-l Han (Thailand) P Plipuech	6	6
WC	(Hong Kong) K-y Ng (China) S Zheng	1	4
(Chinese Taipei) S-y Hsieh (China) Q Ye	6	6
(China) F Xun (China) X You	4	1
(South Korea) J-h Choi (Thailand) L Kumkhum	3	6	[11]
4	(China) X Jiang (China) Q Tang	6	4	[9]
(Greece) V Grammatikopoulou (Netherlands) B Schoofs	5	6	[5]
WC	(China) S Feng (China) J Kang	7	3	[10]
WC	(China) X Sun (China) Yi Zhang	1	4
2	(Japan) N Hibino (Georgia (country)) O Kalashnikova	6	6

Quarterfinals
1	(Japan) S Aoyama (China) Z Yang	7	6
(Japan) M Doi (Japan) M Imanishi	5	1
(China) X Han (China) Xin Wang	6	1	[7]
(South Korea) N-l Han (Thailand) P Plipuech	4	6	[10]
(Chinese Taipei) S-y Hsieh (China) Q Ye	4	2
(South Korea) J-h Choi (Thailand) L Kumkhum	6	6
WC	(China) S Feng (China) J Kang	6	5	[7]
2	(Japan) N Hibino (Georgia (country)) O Kalashnikova	3	7	[10]

Semifinals
1	(Japan) S Aoyama (China) Z Yang	3	6	[10]
(South Korea) N-l Han (Thailand) P Plipuech	6	3	[2]
(South Korea) J-h Choi (Thailand) L Kumkhum	3	6	[10]
2	(Japan) N Hibino (Georgia (country)) O Kalashnikova	6	4	[4]

Final
1	(Japan) S Aoyama (China) Z Yang	6	6
(South Korea) J-h Choi (Thailand) L Kumkhum	2	3
