= 2017 Shenzhen Longhua Open – Women's singles =

Women's singles
- 2017 Shenzhen Longhua Open

Final
- Champion: (Canada) Carol Zhao
- Runner-up: (China) Liu Fangzhou
- Score: 7–5, 6–2

Events
| Singles | men | women |
| Doubles | men | women |
| ← 2016 · | Shenzhen Longhua Open | · 2018 → |

Peng Shuai was the defending champion, but chose not to participate.

Carol Zhao won the title, defeating Liu Fangzhou in the final, 7–5, 6–2.

== Seeds ==
1. (China) Zhu Lin (semifinals)
2. (China) Han Xinyun (first round)
3. (Switzerland) Jil Teichmann (first round)
4. (China) Liu Fangzhou (final)
5. (China) Lu Jingjing (quarterfinals)
6. (United States) Jacqueline Cako (second round)
7. (Germany) Anna Zaja (first round; retired)
8. (United Kingdom) Katie Boulter (first round)

== Draw ==
=== Key ===
- Q = Qualifier
- WC = Wild card
- LL = Lucky loser
- Alt = Alternate
- SE = Special exempt
- PR = Protected ranking
- ITF = ITF entry
- JE = Junior exempt
- w/o = Walkover
- r = Retired
- d = Defaulted
- SR = Special ranking

=== Finals ===
Semifinals
1 | (China) Zhu Lin | 6^{5} | 6 | 5
4 | (China) Liu Fangzhou | 7^{7} | 1 | 7
(China) Zhang Yuxuan | 4 | 6 | 3
(Canada) Carol Zhao | 6 | 3 | 6

Final
4 | (China) Liu Fangzhou | 5 | 2
(Canada) Carol Zhao | 7 | 6

=== Top half ===
First round
1 | (China) L Zhu | 6 | 6
WC | (China) S Cao | 2 | 0
(South Korea) N-l Han | 6 | 6
(Russia) A Pivovarova | 4 | 2
(Japan) S Aoyama | 6 | 6
Q | (China) A Gai | 2 | 2
WC | (China) Y Xu | 1 | 5
6 | (United States) J Cako | 6 | 7
4 | (China) F Liu | 6 | 6
Q | (China) Z Sun | 3 | 4
(China) Z Yang | 4 | 1
(Russia) A Gasanova | 6 | 6
(Serbia) N Stojanović | 4 | 7^{7} | 6
Q | (United States) I Neel | 6 | 6^{5} | 1
(Serbia) N Kostić | 0 | 2
5 | (China) Jin Lu | 6 | 6

Second round
1 | (China) L Zhu | 6 | 2 | 7
(South Korea) N-l Han | 3 | 6 | 5
(Japan) S Aoyama | 6 | 6
6 | (United States) J Cako | 3 | 2
4 | (China) F Liu | 6 | 6
(Russia) A Gasanova | 3 | 1
(Serbia) N Stojanović | 3 | 3
5 | (China) Jin Lu | 6 | 6

Quarterfinals
1 | (China) L Zhu | 5 | 6 | 6
(Japan) S Aoyama | 7 | 3 | 4
4 | (China) F Liu | 6 | 6
5 | (China) Jin Lu | 3 | 3

Semifinals
1 | (China) L Zhu | 6^{5} | 6 | 5
4 | (China) F Liu | 7^{7} | 1 | 7

=== Bottom half ===
First round
8 | (United Kingdom) K Boulter | 2 | 3
(China) Yu Zhang | 6 | 6
(India) A Raina | 3 | 4
(China) F Xun | 6 | 6
(United Kingdom) K Dunne | 6 | 6
(China) H Guo | 1 | 4
(China) X You | 6 | 6
3 | (Switzerland) J Teichmann | 3 | 4
7 | (Germany) A Zaja | 4 | 0^{r}
(Canada) C Zhao | 6 | 0
WC | (China) Yi Zhang | 4 | 1
(United Kingdom) L Robson | 6 | 6
(China) X Sun | 6 | 6
Q | (China) Q Ye | 2 | 2
WC | (China) Xin Wang | 6 | 6
2 | (China) X Han | 3 | 4

Second round
(China) Yu Zhang | 2 | 6 | 7^{7}
(China) F Xun | 6 | 2 | 6^{3}
(United Kingdom) K Dunne | 6 | 6
(China) X You | 1 | 1
(Canada) C Zhao | 6 | 4 | 7
(United Kingdom) L Robson | 1 | 6 | 5
(China) X Sun | w/o
WC | (China) Xin Wang

Quarterfinals
(China) Yu Zhang | 6^{6} | 6 | 7
(United Kingdom) K Dunne | 7^{8} | 3 | 5
(Canada) C Zhao | 7 | 6
(China) X Sun | 5 | 4

Semifinals
(China) Yu Zhang | 4 | 6 | 3
(Canada) C Zhao | 6 | 3 | 6
