= 2019 Shenzhen Longhua Open – Women's doubles =

Women's doubles
- 2019 Shenzhen Longhua Open

Final
- Champions: (Japan) Nao Hibino (Japan) Makoto Ninomiya
- Runners-up: (Georgia (country)) Sofia Shapatava (United Kingdom) Emily Webley-Smith
- Score: 6–4, 6–0

Events
Singles	men	women
Doubles	men	women
← 2018 ·	Shenzhen Longhua Open	· 2023 →

Shuko Aoyama and Yang Zhaoxuan were the defending champions, but chose not to participate.

Nao Hibino and Makoto Ninomiya won the title, defeating Sofia Shapatava and Emily Webley-Smith in the final, 6–4, 6–0.

== Seeds ==
1. (Japan) Nao Hibino / (Japan) Makoto Ninomiya (champions)
2. (Slovenia) Dalila Jakupović / (Russia) Valeria Savinykh (first round)
3. (Japan) Miyu Kato / (Montenegro) Danka Kovinić (first round)
4. (Australia) Arina Rodionova / (Australia) Storm Sanders (first round)

== Draw ==
=== Key ===
- Q = Qualifier
- WC = Wild card
- LL = Lucky loser
- Alt = Alternate
- SE = Special exempt
- PR = Protected ranking
- ITF = ITF entry
- JE = Junior exempt
- w/o = Walkover
- r = Retired
- d = Defaulted
- SR = Special ranking

=== Draw ===
First round
1	(Japan) N Hibino (Japan) M Ninomiya	6	6
(India) A Raina (Netherlands) B Schoofs	3	3
(Russia) N Dzalamidze (Slovenia) K Juvan	6	4	[6]
(South Korea) J-h Choi (South Korea) N-l Han	4	6	[10]
4	(Australia) Ar Rodionova (Australia) S Sanders	5	6	[8]
(China) X Jiang (China) Q Tang	7	4	[10]
WC	(China) H Guo (China) J Kang	2	4
WC	(China) S Xu (China) X You	6	6
WC	(China) M Guo (China) M Wang	6	6
(Chinese Taipei) P-h Chen (Chinese Taipei) Y-c Hsieh	3	4
(Georgia (country)) S Shapatava (United Kingdom) E Webley-Smith	7	6
3	(Japan) M Kato (Montenegro) D Kovinić	5	2
(China) Xin Wang (China) L Zhu	6	6
(Georgia (country)) M Bolkvadze (Serbia) N Kostić	3	1
(Thailand) P Plipuech (Indonesia) A Sutjiadi	6^{5}	6	[10]
2	(Slovenia) D Jakupović (Russia) V Savinykh	7^{7}	1	[7]

Quarterfinals
1	(Japan) N Hibino (Japan) M Ninomiya	7^{7}	7^{7}
(South Korea) J-h Choi (South Korea) N-l Han	6^{2}	6^{4}
(China) X Jiang (China) Q Tang	3
WC	(China) S Xu (China) X You	2^{r}
WC	(China) M Guo (China) M Wang	6	3	[11]
(Georgia (country)) S Shapatava (United Kingdom) E Webley-Smith	3	6	[13]
(China) Xin Wang (China) L Zhu	0	4
(Thailand) P Plipuech (Indonesia) A Sutjiadi	6	6

Semifinals
1	(Japan) N Hibino (Japan) M Ninomiya	6	4	[10]
(China) X Jiang (China) Q Tang	1	6	[7]
(Georgia (country)) S Shapatava (United Kingdom) E Webley-Smith	0	6	[10]
(Thailand) P Plipuech (Indonesia) A Sutjiadi	6	3	[8]

Final
1	(Japan) N Hibino (Japan) M Ninomiya	6	6
(Georgia (country)) S Shapatava (United Kingdom) E Webley-Smith	4	0
