= 2024 Shenzhen Longhua Open =

- Date: 14–20 October
- Edition: 5th
- Category: ATP Challenger Tour
- Surface: Hard
- Location: Shenzhen, China

Champions

Singles
- (United States) Mackenzie McDonald

Doubles
- (Thailand) Pruchya Isaro / (China) Wang Aoran
| ← 2023 · | Shenzhen Longhua Open | · 2025 → |

The 2024 Shenzhen Longhua Open was a professional tennis tournament played on hard courts. It was the fifth edition of the tournament which was part of the 2024 ATP Challenger Tour. It took place in Shenzhen, China between 14 and 20 October 2024.

== Singles main-draw entrants ==
=== Seeds ===
| Country | Player | Rank^{1} | Seed |
|---|---|---|---|
| FRA | Arthur Cazaux | 92 | 1 |
| AUS | Adam Walton | 95 | 2 |
| GBR | Billy Harris | 106 | 3 |
| FRA | Ugo Blanchet | 139 | 4 |
| USA | Mackenzie McDonald | 151 | 5 |
| TPE | Hsu Yu-hsiou | 183 | 6 |
| JPN | Yuta Shimizu | 256 | 7 |
| AUS | James McCabe | 272 | 8 |

- ^{1} Rankings are as of 30 September 2024.

=== Other entrants ===
The following players received wildcards into the singles main draw:

- (China) Chen Xingdao
- (China) Te Rigele
- (China) Xiao Linang

The following player received entry into the singles main draw as an alternate:

- (China) Mo Yecong

The following players received entry from the qualifying draw:

- (Australia) Thomas Fancutt
- (Malaysia) Mitsuki Wei Kang Leong
- (Japan) Ryuki Matsuda
- (France) Arthur Weber
- (China) Zeng Yaojie
- (China) Zhang Tianhui

== Champions ==
=== Singles ===
- (United States) Mackenzie McDonald def. (France) Arthur Cazaux 6–4, 7–6^{(7–4)}.

=== Doubles ===
- (Thailand) Pruchya Isaro / (China) Wang Aoran def. (Chinese Taipei) Ray Ho / (United Kingdom) Joshua Paris 7–6^{(7–4)}, 6–3.
