= 2018 Shenzhen Longhua Open =

- Date: 29 October–4 November (men); 5–11 November (women)
- Edition: 3rd (women); 2nd (men)
- Category: ATP Challenger Tour; ITF Women's Circuit
- Prize money: $100,000 (women) $75,000+H (men)
- Surface: Hard
- Location: Shenzhen, China

Champions

Men's singles
- (Serbia) Miomir Kecmanović

Women's singles
- (Serbia) Ivana Jorović

Men's doubles
- (Chinese Taipei) Hsieh Cheng-peng / (Indonesia) Christopher Rungkat

Women's doubles
- (Japan) Shuko Aoyama / (China) Yang Zhaoxuan
- Shenzhen Longhua Open

The 2018 Shenzhen Longhua Open was a professional tennis tournament played on hard courts. It was the second (men) and third (women) editions of the tournament which was part of the 2018 ATP Challenger Tour and the 2018 ITF Women's Circuit. It took place in Shenzhen, China between 29 October and 11 November 2018.

== Men's singles main-draw entrants ==
=== Seeds ===
Country	Player	Rank^{1}	Seed
MDA	Radu Albot	89	1
ITA	Thomas Fabbiano	106	2
IND	Ramkumar Ramanathan	124	3
IND	Prajnesh Gunneswaran	146	4
SRB	Miomir Kecmanović	149	5
JPN	Yūichi Sugita	157	6
JPN	Go Soeda	183	7
CAN	Filip Peliwo	188	8

- ^{1} Rankings are as of 22 October 2018.

=== Other entrants ===
The following players received wildcards into the singles main draw:

- (China) Mu Tao
- (China) Te Rigele
- (China) Wu Yibing
- (China) Xia Zihao

The following players received entry from the qualifying draw:

- (India) Sasikumar Mukund
- (India) Saketh Myneni
- (India) Sumit Nagal
- (Portugal) Gonçalo Oliveira

== Women's singles main-draw entrants ==
=== Seeds ===
Country	Player	Rank^{1}	Seed
CHN	Zheng Saisai	47	1
CHN	Wang Yafan	83	2
THA	Luksika Kumkhum	103	3
~~CHN~~	~~Zhu Lin~~	~~115~~	~~4~~
JPN	Nao Hibino	123	5
UZB	Sabina Sharipova	127	6
JPN	Misaki Doi	137	7
CHN	Duan Yingying	138	8

- ^{1} Rankings are as of 29 October 2018.

=== Other entrants ===
The following players received wildcards into the singles main draw:

- (China) Ma Shuyue
- (China) Wang Meiling
- (China) Wang Xinyu
- (China) Yang Zhaoxuan

The following player received entry by a special exempt:

- (South Korea) Han Na-lae

The following players received entry from the qualifying draw:

- (Russia) Olga Doroshina
- (South Korea) Jang Su-jeong
- (China) Lu Jingjing
- (Japan) Junri Namigata

The following players received entry as lucky losers:

- (South Korea) Kim Da-bin
- (Thailand) Peangtarn Plipuech
- (China) Yuan Yue

== Champions ==
=== Men's singles ===
- (Serbia) Miomir Kecmanović def. (Slovenia) Blaž Kavčič 6–2, 2–6, 6–3.

=== Women's singles ===
- (Serbia) Ivana Jorović def. (China) Zheng Saisai, 6–3, 2–6, 6–4

=== Men's doubles ===
- (Chinese Taipei) Hsieh Cheng-peng / (Indonesia) Christopher Rungkat def. (India) Sriram Balaji / (India) Jeevan Nedunchezhiyan 6–4, 6–2.

=== Women's doubles ===
- (Japan) Shuko Aoyama / (China) Yang Zhaoxuan def. (South Korea) Choi Ji-hee / (Thailand) Luksika Kumkhum, 6–2, 6–3
