= Bai Zhuoxuan =

Chinese tennis player (born 2002)

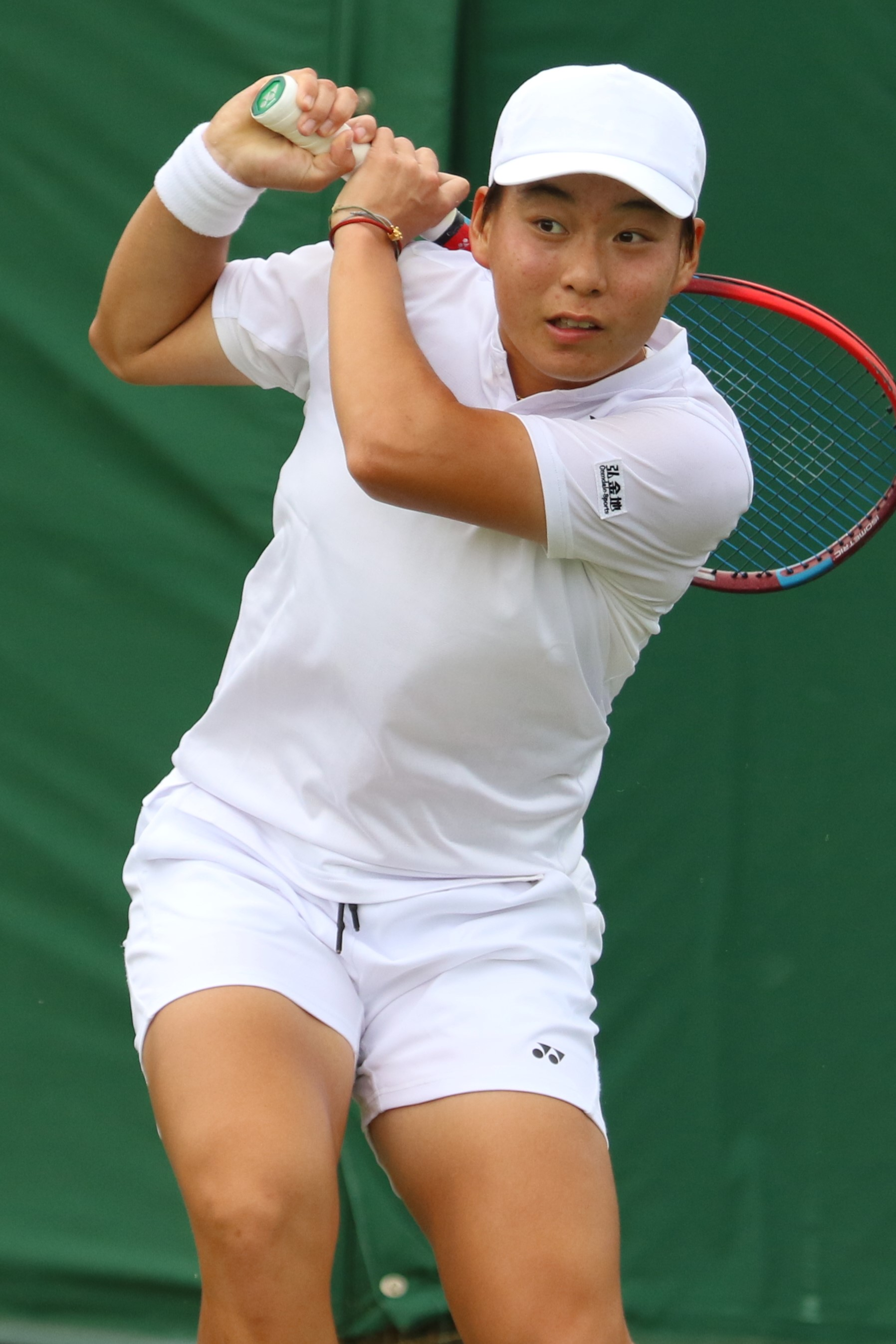
- Bai at the 2023 Wimbledon Championships
- Country (sports): China
- Born: 16 November 2002 (age 24) Henan, China
- Height: 1.75 m (5 ft 9 in)
- Turned pro: 2019
- Plays: Right-handed
- Prize money: $793,013

Singles
- Career record: 148–69
- Career titles: 13 ITF
- Highest ranking: No. 83 (4 March 2024)
- Current ranking: No. 249 (24 August 2026)

Grand Slam singles results
- Australian Open: 2R (2026)
- French Open: 1R (2024)
- Wimbledon: 2R (2023)
- US Open: Q1 (2023, 2024)

Doubles
- Career record: 19–10
- Career titles: 3 ITF
- Highest ranking: No. 789 (3 October 2022)
- Last updated on: 30 August 2026.

Bai Zhuoxuan (Chinese: 白卓璇; born 16 November 2002) is a Chinese professional tennis player. She has a career-high singles ranking by the WTA of No. 83, achieved on 4 March 2024.

== Career ==
=== 2023–2024: Major, WTA Tour and top 100 debuts, hiatus ===
Ranked No. 209, Bai made her WTA Tour debut at the 2023 Internationaux de Strasbourg, after entering the singles main draw as a lucky loser. She held two match points against Varvara Gracheva in the first round, before losing the match.

She made her major debut at the 2023 Wimbledon Championships, after qualifying for the main draw. She reached the second round defeating Ysaline Bonaventure for her first major match win, before losing to eventual finalist, sixth seed Ons Jabeur, in 45 minutes. At the beginning of the Asian swing, she also qualified for the Ningbo Open. She received a wildcard for the qualifying competition into the WTA 1000 2023 China Open. She also received a wildcard for the WTA 500 Zhengzhou Open where she recorded a win over lucky loser Tamara Korpatsch.

In 2024, she made her debuts at the Australian and the French Open but lost in the first rounds. She qualified for a second year in a row at Wimbledon defeating Zarina Diyas in the final round of qualifying but again lost in the first round, this time to Harriet Dart.

=== 2025–2026: Majors comeback ===
Following a long hiatus since August 2024, Bai played in Jiujiang at the 2025 Jiangxi Open, reaching the quarterfinals, She entered the 2026 Australian Open qualifying competition using her protected ranking, and made it to the main draw for a second time. Bai defeated Anastasia Pavlyuchenkova in the first round, before losing her next match to world No. 1, Aryna Sabalenka.

In May 2026, she competed again at the Jiangxi Open, now a WTA 125 event, making the semifinals and losing there in two sets to Liang En-shuo.

== Grand Slam singles performance timeline ==
Key
W	F	SF	QF	#R	RR	Q#	DNQ	A	NH

(W) winner; (F) finalist; (SF) semifinalist; (QF) quarterfinalist; (#R) rounds 4, 3, 2, 1; (RR) round-robin stage; (Q#) qualification round; (DNQ) did not qualify; (A) absent; (NH) not held; (SR) strike rate (events won / competed); (W–L) win–loss record.
To avoid confusion and double counting, these charts are updated at the conclusion of a tournament or when the player's participation has ended.

Tournament	2023	2024	2025	2026	SR	W–L	Win%
Australian Open	A	1R	A	2R	0 / 2	1–2	33%
French Open	A	1R	A	A	0 / 1	0–1	0%
Wimbledon	2R	1R	A	Q2	0 / 2	1–2	33%
US Open	Q1	Q1	A		0 / 0	0–0	–
Win–loss	1–1	0–3	0–0	1–1	0 / 5	2–5	29%

== ITF Circuit finals ==
=== Singles: 16 (13 titles, 3 runner-ups) ===
Legend
W100 tournaments (2–0)
W25 tournaments (5–2)
W15 tournaments (6–1)

Result	W–L	Date	Tournament	Tier	Surface	Opponent	Score
Win	1–0	Oct 2021	ITF Sharm El Sheikh, Egypt	W15	Hard	(United Kingdom) Emilie Lindh	6–3, 6–2
Win	2–0	Oct 2021	ITF Sharm El Sheikh	W15	Hard	(China) Li Zongyu	6–4, 6–3
Win	3–0	Oct 2021	ITF Sharm El Sheikh	W15	Hard	(Hong Kong) Eudice Chong	4–6, 6–0, 6–4
Win	4–0	Nov 2021	ITF Sharm El Sheikh	W15	Hard	(Romania) Elena-Teodora Cadar	6–1, 6–3
Win	5–0	Nov 2021	ITF Sharm El Sheikh	W15	Hard	(Romania) Elena-Teodora Cadar	3–6, 7–6^{(5)}, 6–0
Loss	5–1	Sep 2022	ITF Monastir, Tunisia	W15	Hard	(China) Wei Sijia	1–6, 4–6
Win	6–1	Sep 2022	ITF Monastir, Tunisia	W15	Hard	(Italy) Samira de Stefano	6–2, 6–4
Win	7–1	Oct 2022	ITF Hua Hin, Thailand	W25	Hard	(China) You Xiaodi	7–5, 6–4
Win	8–1	Oct 2022	ITF Hua Hin, Thailand	W25	Hard	(Hong Kong) Cody Wong	3–6, 6–0, 6–3
Loss	8–2	Mar 2023	Open de Touraine, France	W25	Hard (i)	(China) Wei Sijia	4–6, 6–7^{(5)}
Loss	8–3	Mar 2023	ITF Jakarta, Indonesia	W25	Hard (i)	(Russia) Anastasia Zakharova	6–3, 3–6, 4–6
Win	9–3	Apr 2023	ITF Jakarta, Indonesia	W25	Hard (i)	(India) Ankita Raina	3–6, 6–0, 6–2
Win	10–3	May 2023	ITF Kakheti, Georgia	W25	Hard	(Russia) Valeria Savinykh	6–4, 7–5
Win	11–3	Oct 2023	Shenzhen Longhua Open, China	W100	Hard	(China) Yuan Yue	7–6^{(7–5)}, 6–2
Win	12–3	Nov 2023	Takasaki Open, Japan	W100	Hard	(China) Yuan Yue	6–2, 6–3
Win	13–3	Apr 2026	ITF Luzhou, China	W35	Hard	(China) Shi Han	6–4, 0–6, 6–1

=== Doubles: 5 (3 titles, 2 runner-ups) ===
Legend
W15 tournaments (3–2)

Result	W–L	Date	Tournament	Tier	Surface	Partner	Opponents	Score
Win	1–0	Oct 2021	ITF Sharm El Sheikh, Egypt	W15	Hard	(Thailand) Punnin Kovapitukted	(India) Ashmitha Easwaramurthi (Hungary) Rebeka Stolmár	6–0, 6–4
Win	2–0	Oct 2021	ITF Sharm El Sheikh, Egypt	W15	Hard	(Thailand) Punnin Kovapitukted	(Hong Kong) Eudice Chong (Hong Kong) Cody Wong	4–6, 6–2, [10–7]
Loss	2–1	Nov 2021	ITF Sharm El Sheikh, Egypt	W15	Hard	(Thailand) Punnin Kovapitukted	(Hong Kong) Eudice Chong (Hong Kong) Cody Wong	6–4, 1–6, [4–10]
Loss	2–2	Nov 2021	ITF Sharm El Sheikh, Egypt	W15	Hard	(Thailand) Punnin Kovapitukted	(Romania) Elena-Teodora Cadar (Hong Kong) Cody Wong	2–6, 3–6
Win	3–2	Nov 2021	ITF Cairo, Egypt	W15	Hard	(Thailand) Punnin Kovapitukted	(Kazakhstan) Yekaterina Dmitrichenko (Germany) Antonia Schmidt	6–3, 7–6^{(1)}
