= 2017 Shenzhen Longhua Open =

- Date: 30 October–5 November (men); 6–12 November (women)
- Edition: 2nd (women); 1st (men)
- Prize money: $75,000+H (men) $100,000 (women)
- Surface: Hard
- Location: Shenzhen, China

Champions

Men's singles
- (Moldova) Radu Albot

Women's singles
- (Canada) Carol Zhao

Men's doubles
- (India) Sriram Balaji / (India) Vishnu Vardhan

Women's doubles
- (United States) Jacqueline Cako / (Serbia) Nina Stojanović
← 2016 ·	Shenzhen Longhua Open	· 2018 →

The 2017 Shenzhen Longhua Open was a professional tennis tournament played on hard courts. It was the first (men) and second (women) editions of the tournament which was part of the 2017 ATP Challenger Tour and the 2017 ITF Women's Circuit. It took place in Shenzhen, China between 30 October and 12 November 2017.

== Men's singles main-draw entrants ==
=== Seeds ===
Country	Player	Rank^{1}	Seed
RUS	Mikhail Youzhny	101	1
SLO	Blaž Kavčič	107	2
MDA	Radu Albot	113	3
CAN	Peter Polansky	129	4
BRA	Thiago Monteiro	134	5
AUS	Akira Santillan	162	6
~~JPN~~	~~Go Soeda~~	~~167~~	~~7~~
FRA	Calvin Hemery	176	8
KOR	Lee Duck-hee	191	9

- ^{1} Rankings are as of 23 October 2017.

=== Other entrants ===
The following players received wildcards into the singles main draw:

- (China) Te Rigele
- (China) Wang Chuhan
- (China) Wu Yibing
- (China) Zhang Zhizhen

The following players received entry from the qualifying draw:

- (Italy) Riccardo Ghedin
- (Poland) Hubert Hurkacz
- (Australia) Marinko Matosevic
- (Netherlands) Miliaan Niesten

The following players received entry as lucky losers:

- (Japan) Naoki Nakagawa
- (Japan) Kaichi Uchida

== Women's singles main-draw entrants ==
=== Seeds ===
Country	Player	Rank^{1}	Seed
CHN	Zhu Lin	105	1
CHN	Han Xinyun	129	2
SUI	Jil Teichmann	142	3
CHN	Liu Fangzhou	154	4
CHN	Lu Jingjing	167	5
USA	Jacqueline Cako	183	6
GER	Anna Zaja	213	7
GBR	Katie Boulter	215	8

- ^{1} Rankings are as of 30 October 2017.

=== Other entrants ===
The following players received wildcards into the singles main draw:

- (China) Cao Siqi
- (China) Wang Xinyu
- (China) Xu Yifan
- (China) Zhang Ying

The following players received entry from the qualifying draw:

- (China) Gai Ao
- (United States) Ingrid Neel
- (China) Sun Ziyue
- (China) Ye Qiuyu

== Champions ==
=== Men's singles ===
- (Moldova) Radu Albot def. (Poland) Hubert Hurkacz 7–6^{(8–6)}, 6–7^{(3–7)}, 6–4.

=== Women's singles ===
- (Canada) Carol Zhao def. (China) Liu Fangzhou, 7–5, 6–2

=== Men's doubles ===
- (India) Sriram Balaji / (India) Vishnu Vardhan def. (United States) Austin Krajicek / (United States) Jackson Withrow 7–6^{(7–3)}, 7–6^{(7–3)}.

=== Women's doubles ===
- (United States) Jacqueline Cako / (Serbia) Nina Stojanović def. (Japan) Shuko Aoyama / (China) Yang Zhaoxuan, 6–4, 6–2
