= Carol Zhao =

Canadian tennis player born 1995

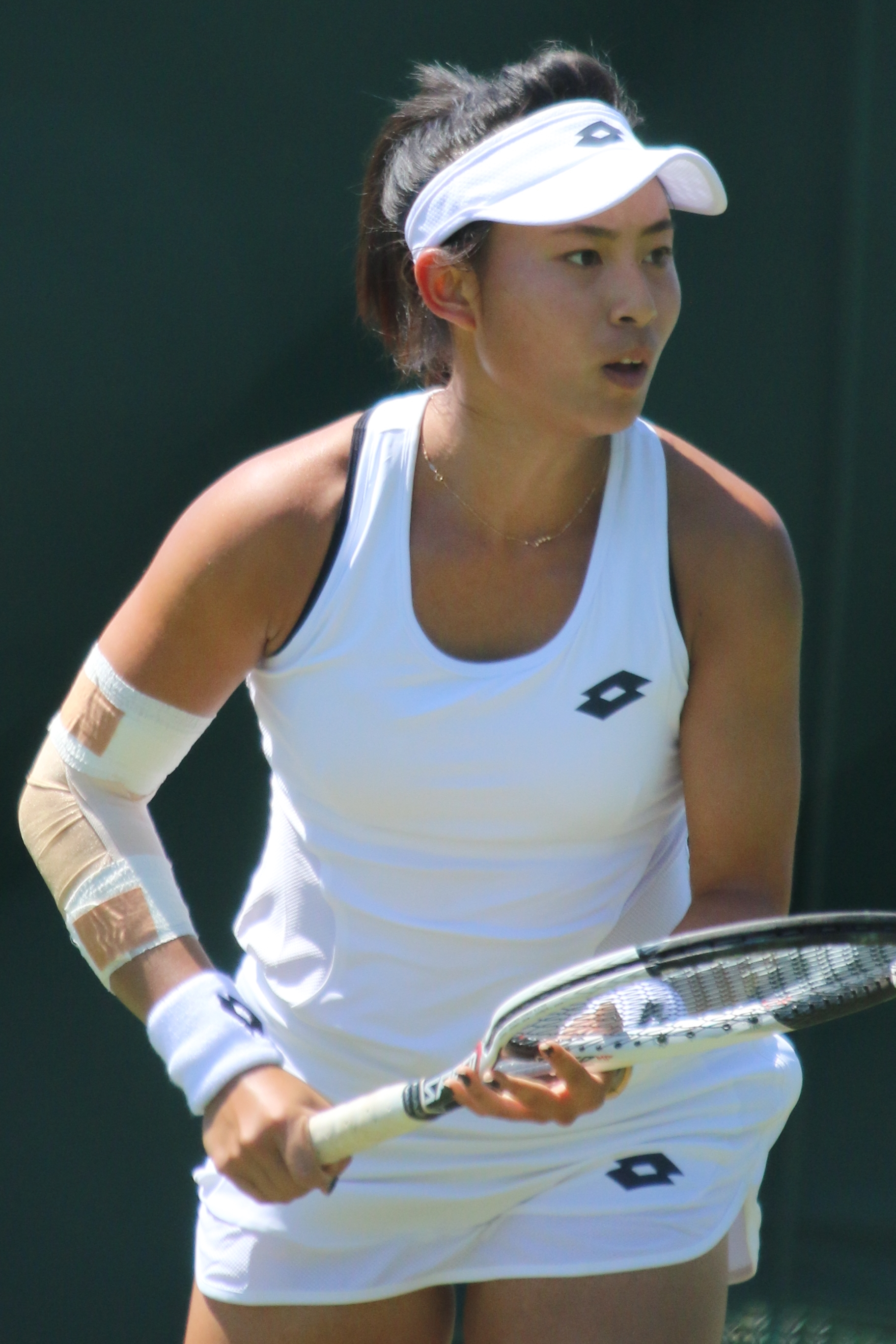
- Zhao at the 2018 Wimbledon Championships
- Country (sports): Canada
- Residence: Richmond Hill, Ontario, CA
- Born: June 20, 1995 (age 31) Chongqing, China
- Height: 1.68 m (5 ft 6 in)
- Turned pro: 2016
- Plays: Right (two-handed backhand)
- College: Stanford Cardinal
- Prize money: $924,444

Singles
- Career record: 285–281
- Career titles: 4 ITF
- Highest ranking: No. 131 (June 25, 2018)
- Current ranking: No. 586 (August 24, 2026)

Grand Slam singles results
- Australian Open: Q2 (2023, 2024)
- French Open: Q3 (2021)
- Wimbledon: 1R (2023)
- US Open: Q2 (2025)

Doubles
- Career record: 94–93
- Career titles: 6 ITF
- Highest ranking: No. 157 (July 18, 2016)

Team competitions
- Fed Cup: 3–3

Chinese name
- Simplified Chinese: 赵一羽
Transcriptions
Standard Mandarin
- Hanyu Pinyin: Zhào Yīyǔ
Medal record
Representing Canada
Women's tennis
Pan American Games
Gold medal – first place	2015 Toronto	Doubles
- Last updated on: August 29, 2026.

Carol Zhao (born June 20, 1995) is a Chinese-Canadian tennis player. She reached her career-high WTA singles ranking of No. 131 in June 2018, and her career-high junior rank of No. 9 in January 2013. She won the Australian Open junior doubles title in 2013. Zhao was a member of the Stanford University tennis team, ending her college career with a 76–16 overall record and leading the team to win the 2016 NCAA championship. She also was the 2015 NCAA singles runner-up.

She turned professional in June 2016 and was Canada's top singles player from June 11, 2018, to July 23, 2018.

== Early life ==
Zhao was born in Chongqing, China, to Ping and Lily Zhao and started playing tennis at the age of five, with the encouragement of her grade school teacher. At the age of seven, she and her family emigrated to Canada and settled in the city of Richmond Hill, Ontario. In September 2010, she relocated to Montreal to be part of the National Training Centre until August 2013.

== Tennis career ==
=== 2010–11 ===
In July 2010, Zhao won three straight junior singles tournaments at the G5 in Edmonton, G4 in Vancouver and G5 in Manitoba, respectively. She also won three junior doubles tournaments around that time. She reached the semifinals in doubles of the GB1 in Tulsa in October. In November, Zhao played her first professional quarterfinal at the $50k tournament in Toronto.

In January 2011, Zhao reached the semifinals in doubles to back to back tournaments, the GA in Tlalnepantla and the G1 in San José. In March, she lost to Ashleigh Barty in the final of the G1 in Kuching. Zhao reached in June the second round of the French Open, her first junior Grand Slam tournament, and lost in the first round of the US Open in September.

=== 2012 ===
In January 2012, Zhao lost in the second round in singles and the quarterfinals in doubles at the junior Australian Open. In March, she made the final in both singles and doubles of the G1 in Nonthaburi, but only won the doubles title. She lost a week later to Elizaveta Kulichkova in the final of the G1 in Sarawak. Zhao reached the second round for the second straight year at the junior French Open. In late June, Zhao reached her third G1 final of the year, but lost this time to fellow Canadian Eugenie Bouchard in three sets. Three of the four semifinalists were Canadian at this tournament (the third was Françoise Abanda). However, she lost in the first round of the junior Wimbledon Championships.

In September, Zhao lost in an all-Canadian final at the G1 in Repentigny to Françoise Abanda. A week later, she made it to the third round in singles at the junior US Open. She also reached the quarterfinals in doubles. In mid-September, Zhao reached the quarterfinals in doubles of the WTA tournament in Quebec City. In October, she ended runner-up in the GB1 in Tulsa, but won the final in doubles.

=== 2013 ===
Zhao lost in the second round of the junior Australian Open in singles, but won the doubles title with Ana Konjuh by defeating Oleksandra Korashvili and Barbora Krejčíková in the final. In May, she made it to her first professional doubles final at the $10k event in Pula, but lost to Italians Martina Caregaro and Anna Floris. She also reached her first singles final at the same tournament, but was defeated this time by Sofiya Kovalets. At the junior event of the French Open, Zhao reached the third round in singles and made it to the semifinals in doubles. She also reached the third round at the junior Wimbledon in singles and the quarterfinals in doubles.

Zhao won in July the doubles title at the $25k event in Granby, her first pro title. At the beginning of August, she qualified for her first WTA Tour main draw at the Premier 5 Rogers Cup in Toronto when she defeated her first top 100 player Irina-Camelia Begu in straight sets in last round of qualifying. She was eliminated by No. 31, Anastasia Pavlyuchenkova, in the first round. She made it to the quarterfinals in doubles for the second straight year at the Challenge Bell in mid-September.

=== 2014 ===
In July at the $25k Challenger de Gatineau, her first tournament in nine months, Zhao made it to the semifinals in doubles. She made it a week later, with Erin Routliffe, to her third professional doubles final and second consecutive at the $25k Challenger de Granby but had to withdraw before the final because of an injury. At the Stanford Classic at the end of July, Zhao qualified for her second WTA Tour main draw and scored her first win on the tour when Yanina Wickmayer retired in the second set of the opening round. She was eliminated by No. 11, Ana Ivanovic, in the second round. In late August, Zhao reached the quarterfinals in singles and the semifinals in doubles of the $25k event in Winnipeg.

=== 2015 ===
In late June, Zhao made it to the semifinals in singles and in doubles of the $25k tournament in Sumter. The next week, she reached the quarterfinals at the $25k in Baton Rouge. At the Pan American Games in July, Zhao won a gold medal with Gabriela Dabrowski in the doubles event. In August, at the $25k Challenger de Gatineau, she reached the semifinals in singles and won the doubles title with Jessica Moore. A week later, she was awarded a wildcard for the main draw of the Stanford Classic but was defeated by No. 63, Mona Barthel, in the opening round. At the Rogers Cup in August, Zhao earned a wildcard for the singles main draw but lost to No. 43, Madison Brengle, in the first round. She also reached the quarterfinals in doubles with fellow Canadian Sharon Fichman. In October, she reached the quarterfinals in singles at the Challenger de Saguenay and the semifinals in both singles and doubles at the Toronto Challenger.

=== 2016–18 ===
In January 2016 Zhao reached the final of the $25k event in Daytona Beach, Florida with Sharon Fichman. In February, she and partner Jessica Pegula were runners-up at the $25k in Rancho Santa Fe. At the $25k in Sumter, South Carolina in June, her first tournament as a professional, Zhao reached the final in doubles. She also reached the doubles final of the $25k in El Paso, Texas at the beginning of July. At the Stanford Classic, Zhao was awarded a wildcard for the singles main draw for the second straight year, but was defeated by No. 71, Nicole Gibbs, in three sets in the opening round. She also lost in the first round in doubles.

In January 2017 at the $15k event in Petit-Bourg, Zhao won her third doubles title, this time with Mayo Hibi. She advanced to the doubles final of the $15k in Heraklion with compatriot Charlotte Robillard-Millette in March. Two weeks later, she won the third $15k in Heraklion, which was the fourth doubles title of her career title and her first with Robillard-Millette. In July, she won the doubles title with Ellen Perez at the $60k Challenger de Granby. In August at the $100k Vancouver Open, Zhao advanced to the semifinals where she was defeated by Danka Kovinić. The next week at the $25k tournament in Tsukuba, she reached the second singles final of her career but lost to Zhang Ling. The week after, Zhao captured her first singles title with a win over Junri Namigata at the $25k in Nanao. In October at the $60k event in Saguenay, she reached the quarterfinals in singles and won the doubles title with fellow Canadian Bianca Andreescu. In November, she won her second singles title defeating Liu Fangzhou in the final of the $100k Shenzhen Longhua Open.

She reached a career-high singles ranking of No. 131 on June 25, 2018.

=== 2023: Major debut ===
Zhao recorded her first WTA Tour win of 2023 at the Copa Colsanitas in Colombia against María Lourdes Carlé, before losing her next match to Francesca Jones. She reached the second round of qualifying at the French Open.

At the Rosmalen Open, she qualified for the main draw and defeated Ysaline Bonaventure in the first round for her second tour match win of the season and first-ever success at that level on grass. She then lost to top seed Veronika Kudermetova.

Zhao qualified for the main draw at Wimbledon on her ninth attempt to make her major debut, losing in the first round to Tamara Korpatsch, in three sets.

She also qualified for the WTA 1000 Guadalajara Open, suffering a first round defeat to Sofia Kenin.

=== 2024: Korean Open second round ===
Zhao qualified for the main draw at the Monterrey Open but lost in the first round to Petra Martić, in three sets.

The following month, she qualified for the newly upgraded WTA 500 Korea Open, defeating Back Da-yeon to set up a second-round meeting with fourth seed Diana Shnaider which she lost in straight sets.

== Performance timeline ==
Key
W	F	SF	QF	#R	RR	Q#	P#	DNQ	A	Z#	PO	G	S	B	NMS	NTI	P	NH

(W) winner; (F) finalist; (SF) semifinalist; (QF) quarterfinalist; (#R) rounds 4, 3, 2, 1; (RR) round-robin stage; (Q#) qualification round; (P#) preliminary round; (DNQ) did not qualify; (A) absent; (Z#) Davis/Fed Cup Zonal Group (with number indication) or (PO) play-off; (G) gold, (S) silver or (B) bronze Olympic/Paralympic medal; (NMS) not a Masters tournament; (NTI) not a Tier I tournament; (P) postponed; (NH) not held; (SR) strike rate (events won / competed); (W–L) win–loss record.
To avoid confusion and double counting, these charts are updated at the conclusion of a tournament or when the player's participation has ended.

Only main-draw results in WTA Tour, Grand Slam tournaments, Fed Cup/Billie Jean King Cup and Olympic Games are included in win–loss records.

=== Singles ===
Current through the 2023 French Open.

Tournament	2011	2012	2013	2014	2015	2016	2017	2018	2019	2020	2021	2022	2023	2024	2025	SR	W–L
Grand Slam tournaments
Australian Open	A	A	A	A	A	A	A	Q1	A	A	A	A	Q2	Q2	A	0 / 0	0–0
French Open	A	A	A	A	A	A	A	Q1	A	A	Q3	A	Q2	Q1	A	0 / 0	0–0
Wimbledon	A	A	A	A	A	A	A	Q1	A	NH	A	A	1R	Q1	A	0 / 1	0–1
US Open	A	A	A	A	A	A	A	Q1	A	A	A	Q1	A	A	Q2	0 / 0	0–0
Win–loss	0–0	0–0	0–0	0–0	0–0	0–0	0–0	0–0	0–0	0–0	0–0	0–0	0–1	0–0	0–0	0 / 1	0–1
WTA 1000
Indian Wells Open	A	A	A	A	A	A	A	Q1	A	NH	A	A	A	A	A	0 / 0	0–0
Miami Open	A	A	A	A	A	A	A	Q2	A	NH	A	A	Q1	A	A	0 / 0	0–0
Canadian Open	Q1	Q1	1R	Q2	1R	Q1	Q2	1R	Q1	NH	1R	1R	Q1	Q2	Q1	0 / 5	0–5
Guadalajara Open	NH											Q1	1R	A	A	0 / 1	0–1
Career statistics
Tournaments	0	0	1	1	2	2	1	3	0	0	2	3	1	0	0	Career total: 16	
Overall win-loss	0–0	0–0	0–1	1–1	0–2	0–2	0–1	0–4	0–0	0–0	0–3	1–3	0–1	0–0	0–0	0 / 16	2–18
Year-end ranking	591	684	447	299	344	489	221	210	442	544	325	163	199	266	288	$413,106	

== ITF Circuit finals ==
=== Singles: 8 (4 titles, 4 runner-ups) ===
Legend
W100 tournaments (2–0)
W25 tournaments (2–3)
W10 tournaments (0–1)

Result	W–L	Date	Tournament	Tier	Surface	Opponent	Score
Loss	0–1	May 2013	ITF Santa Margherita di Pula, Italy	W10	Clay	(Ukraine) Sofiya Kovalets	3–6, 2–6
Loss	0–2	Aug 2017	ITF Tsukuba, Japan	W25	Hard	(Hong Kong) Zhang Ling	5–7, 6–7^{(4)}
Win	1–2	Sep 2017	ITF Nanao, Japan	W25	Carpet	(Japan) Junri Namigata	6–3, 6–2
Win	2–2	Nov 2017	Shenzhen Longhua Open, China	W100	Hard	(China) Liu Fangzhou	7–5, 6–2
Loss	2–3	Feb 2021	ITF Potchefstroom, South Africa	W25	Hard	(Spain) Nuria Párrizas Díaz	3–6, 0–6
Loss	2–4	May 2021	ITF Salinas, Ecuador	W25	Hard	(Japan) Mai Hontama	5–7, 1–6
Win	3–4	Jun 2022	ITF Incheon, South Korea	W25	Hard	(Japan) Mayuka Aikawa	6–4, 6–1
Win	4–4	Jul 2022	ITF Charleston Pro, United States	W100	Clay	(Japan) Himeno Sakatsume	3–6, 6–4, 6–4

=== Doubles: 13 (6 titles, 7 runner-ups) ===
Legend
W60 tournaments (2–0)
W25 tournaments (2–5)
W10/15 tournaments (2–2)

Result	W–L	Date	Tournament	Tier	Surface	Partner	Opponents	Score
Loss	0–1	May 2013	ITF Santa Margherita di Pula, Italy	W10	Clay	(Canada) Erin Routliffe	(Italy) Martina Caregaro (Italy) Anna Floris	2–6, 7–5, [7–10]
Win	1–1	Jul 2013	Challenger de Granby, Canada	W25	Hard	(United States) Lena Litvak	(France) Julie Coin (United Kingdom) Emily Webley-Smith	7–5, 6–4
Loss	1–2	Jul 2014	Challenger de Granby, Canada	W25	Hard	(Canada) Erin Routliffe	(Japan) Hiroko Kuwata (Japan) Riko Sawayanagi	w/o
Win	2–2	Aug 2015	Challenger de Gatineau, Canada	W25	Hard	(Australia) Jessica Moore	(Mexico) Victoria Rodríguez (Mexico) Marcela Zacarías	6–3, 6–4
Loss	2–3	Jan 2016	ITF Daytona Beach, United States	W25	Clay	(Canada) Sharon Fichman	(Russia) Natela Dzalamidze (Russia) Veronika Kudermetova	4–6, 3–6
Loss	2–4	Feb 2016	Rancho Santa Fe Open, United States	W25	Hard	(United States) Jessica Pegula	(United States) Asia Muhammad (United States) Taylor Townsend	3–6, 4–6
Loss	2–5	Jun 2016	ITF Sumter, US	W25	Hard	(United States) Jamie Loeb	(United States) Ashley Weinhold (United States) Caitlin Whoriskey	6–7^{(5)}, 1–6
Loss	2–6	Jul 2016	ITF El Paso, US	W25	Hard	(United States) Sanaz Marand	(United States) Ashley Weinhold (United States) Caitlin Whoriskey	4–6, 6–7^{(3)}
Win	3–6	Jan 2017	ITF Petit-Bourg, France	W15	Hard (i)	(Japan) Mayo Hibi	(Denmark) Emilie Francati (Canada) Charlotte Robillard-Millette	2–6, 7–6^{(6)}, [11–9]
Loss	3–7	Mar 2017	ITF Heraklion, Greece	W15	Clay	(Canada) Charlotte Robillard-Millette	(Romania) Raluca Georgiana Șerban (Romania) Oana Georgeta Simion	6–3, 6–7^{(2)}, [2–10]
Win	4–7	Apr 2017	ITF Heraklion, Greece	W15	Clay	(Canada) Charlotte Robillard-Millette	(Russia) Angelina Gabueva (Russia) Olga Puchkova	7–6^{(2)}, 4–6, [10–5]
Win	5–7	Jul 2017	Challenger de Granby, Canada	W60	Hard	(Australia) Ellen Perez	(Chile) Alexa Guarachi (Australia) Olivia Tjandramulia	6–2, 6–2
Win	6–7	Oct 2017	Challenger de Saguenay, Canada	W60	Hard (i)	(Canada) Bianca Andreescu	(United States) Francesca Di Lorenzo (New Zealand) Erin Routliffe	w/o

== Junior Grand Slam tournament finals ==
=== Doubles: 1 (title) ===
Result	Year	Championship	Surface	Partner	Opponents	Score
Win	2013	Australian Open	Hard	(Croatia) Ana Konjuh	(Ukraine) Oleksandra Korashvili (Czech Republic) Barbora Krejčíková	5–7, 6–4, [10–7]
