= Shenzhen Longhua Open =

- 2024 Shenzhen Longhua Open

Defunct tennis tournament
- Event name: ITF Circuit – Shenzhen Longhua
- Location: Longhua District, Shenzhen, China
- Venue: Mission Hills Ecological Sports Park Tennis Center
- Surface: Hard
ATP Tour
- Category: ATP Challenger Tour 100
- Draw: 32S/32Q/16D
- Prize money: $133,250 (2024), $75,000+H
WTA Tour
- Category: ITF Women's Circuit
- Draw: 32S/32Q/16D
- Prize money: $100,000

The Shenzhen Longhua Open was a tennis tournament played on outdoor hardcourts. The event was classified as an ITF Women's Circuit and an ATP Challenger Tour Men's tournament, and has been held in Shenzhen, China from 2017 until 2019, in 2023 and in 2024.

== Past finals ==
=== Men's singles ===
Year	Champion	Runner-up	Score
2024	(United States) Mackenzie McDonald	(France) Arthur Cazaux	6–4, 7–6^{(7–4)}
2023	(United States) Aleksandar Kovacevic	(Portugal) Nuno Borges	7–6^{(7–4)}, 7–6^{(7–5)}
2020–2022	Not held		
2019	(China) Zhang Zhizhen	(China) Li Zhe	6–3, 4–6, 6–1
2018	(Serbia) Miomir Kecmanović	(Slovenia) Blaž Kavčič	6–2, 2–6, 6–3
2017	(Moldova) Radu Albot	(Poland) Hubert Hurkacz	7–6^{(8–6)}, 6–7^{(3–7)}, 6–4

=== Women's singles ===
Year	Champion	Runner-up	Score
2023	(China) Bai Zhuoxuan	(China) Yuan Yue	7–6^{(7–5)}, 6–2
2020–2022	Not held		
2019	(China) Zhu Lin	(China) Peng Shuai	6–3, 1–3, ret.
2018	(Serbia) Ivana Jorović	(China) Zheng Saisai	6–3, 2–6, 6–4
2017	(Canada) Carol Zhao	(China) Liu Fangzhou	7–5, 6–2
2016	(China) Peng Shuai	(Romania) Patricia Maria Țig	3–6, 7–5, 6–4

=== Men's doubles ===
Year	Champions	Runners-up	Score
2024	(Thailand) Pruchya Isaro (China) Wang Aoran	(Chinese Taipei) Ray Ho (United Kingdom) Joshua Paris	7–6^{(7–4)}, 6–3
2023	(Austria) Alexander Erler (Austria) Lucas Miedler	(Poland) Piotr Matuszewski (Australia) Matthew Romios	6–3, 6–4
2020–2022	Not held		
2019	(Chinese Taipei) Hsieh Cheng-peng (Chinese Taipei) Yang Tsung-hua	(Russia) Mikhail Elgin (India) Ramkumar Ramanathan	6–2, 7–5
2018	(Chinese Taipei) Hsieh Cheng-peng (Indonesia) Christopher Rungkat	(India) Sriram Balaji (India) Jeevan Nedunchezhiyan	6–4, 6–2
2017	(India) Sriram Balaji (India) Vishnu Vardhan	(United States) Austin Krajicek (United States) Jackson Withrow	7–6^{(7–3)}, 7–6^{(7–3)}

=== Women's doubles ===
Year	Champions	Runners-up	Score
2023	(France) Kristina Mladenovic (Japan) Moyuka Uchijima	(Hungary) Tímea Babos (Ukraine) Kateryna Volodko	6–2, 7–5
2020–2022	Not held		
2019	(Japan) Nao Hibino (Japan) Makoto Ninomiya	(Georgia (country)) Sofia Shapatava (United Kingdom) Emily Webley-Smith	6–4, 6–0
2018	(Japan) Shuko Aoyama (China) Yang Zhaoxuan	(South Korea) Choi Ji-hee (Thailand) Luksika Kumkhum	6–2, 6–3
2017	(United States) Jacqueline Cako (Serbia) Nina Stojanović	(Japan) Shuko Aoyama (China) Yang Zhaoxuan	6–4, 6–2
2016	(Serbia) Nina Stojanović (China) You Xiaodi	(China) Han Xinyun (China) Zhu Lin	6–4, 7–6^{(8–6)}
