= 2013 Suzhou Ladies Open – Singles =

Singles
- 2013 Suzhou Ladies Open

Final
- Champion: (Israel) Shahar Pe'er
- Runner-up: (China) Zheng Saisai
- Score: 6–2, 2–6, 6–3

Events
Singles	Doubles
← 2012 ·	Suzhou Ladies Open	· 2014 →

Hsieh Su-wei was the defending champion, but decided not to participate.

Shahar Pe'er won the title, defeating Zheng Saisai in the final 6–2, 2–6, 6–3.

== Seeds ==
1. (Hungary) Tímea Babos (semifinals)
2. (Japan) Misaki Doi (semifinals)
3. (Israel) Shahar Pe'er (champion)
4. (China) Zhang Shuai (quarterfinals)
5. (China) Duan Yingying (first round; retired)
6. (China) Zhou Yimiao (quarterfinals)
7. (Thailand) Tamarine Tanasugarn (quarterfinals)
8. (France) Alizé Lim (first round)

== Main draw ==
=== Key ===
- Q = Qualifier
- WC = Wild card
- LL = Lucky loser
- Alt = Alternate
- SE = Special exempt
- PR = Protected ranking
- ITF = ITF entry
- JE = Junior exempt
- w/o = Walkover
- r = Retired
- d = Defaulted
- SR = Special ranking

=== Finals ===
Semifinals
1	(Hungary) Tímea Babos	1	3
3	(Israel) Shahar Pe'er	6	6
(China) Zheng Saisai	7	6
2	(Japan) Misaki Doi	5	2

Final
3	(Israel) Shahar Pe'er	6	2	6
(China) Zheng Saisai	2	6	3

=== Top half ===
First round
1	(Hungary) T Babos	6	6
WC	(China) L Zhu	4	4
(Slovakia) M Hončová	3	6	6
(China) Y Zhang	6	4	4
WC	(China) Z Yang	6^{3}	0^{r}
LL	(South Korea) S-r Lee	7^{7}	3
(Japan) J Namigata	1	6	3
7	(Thailand) T Tanasugarn	6	4	6
3	(Israel) S Pe'er	6	6
WC	(China) C Liu	3	1
(Kazakhstan) Z Diyas	6	3	6
(Hong Kong) L Zhang	2	6	2
(Japan) E Sema	2	4
PR	(Netherlands) M Krajicek	6	6
(Japan) Y Sema	2	1
6	(China) Y Zhou	6	6

Second round
1	(Hungary) T Babos	6	7
(Slovakia) M Hončová	2	5
LL	(South Korea) S-r Lee	7^{8}	0	3
7	(Thailand) T Tanasugarn	6^{6}	6	6
3	(Israel) S Pe'er	7^{8}	6
(Kazakhstan) Z Diyas	6^{6}	3
PR	(Netherlands) M Krajicek	4	3
6	(China) Y Zhou	6	6

Quarterfinals
1	(Hungary) T Babos	6	6
7	(Thailand) T Tanasugarn	3	3
3	(Israel) S Pe'er	6	3	6
6	(China) Y Zhou	4	6	3

Semifinals
1	(Hungary) T Babos	1	3
3	(Israel) S Pe'er	6	6

=== Bottom half ===
First round
8	(France) A Lim	2	3
(China) S Zheng	6	6
Q	(China) F Liu	6	3	6
(Thailand) Vara Wongteanchai	3	6	0
(Chinese Taipei) C-w Chan	1	2
(Thailand) N Lertcheewakarn	6	6
Q	(China) X Han	2	6^{3}
4	(China) S Zhang	6	7^{7}
5	(China) Y Duan	2	0^{r}
(Japan) E Hozumi	6	0
Q	(China) Y Hu	6	6
Q	(Thailand) P Plipuech	1	4
(China) X Wen	1	0^{r}
(China) Y Xu	6	3
WC	(China) Y Wang	0	2
2	(Japan) M Doi	6	6

Second round
(China) S Zheng	7	6
Q	(China) F Liu	5	2
(Thailand) N Lertcheewakarn	1	3
4	(China) S Zhang	6	6
(Japan) E Hozumi	6	2	6
Q	(China) Y Hu	4	6	1
(China) Y Xu	6^{4}	3
2	(Japan) M Doi	7^{7}	6

Quarterfinals
(China) S Zheng	7^{7}	2	6
4	(China) S Zhang	6^{4}	6	2
(Japan) E Hozumi	4	3
2	(Japan) M Doi	6	6

Semifinals
(China) S Zheng	7	6
2	(Japan) M Doi	5	2
