= 2013 Suzhou Ladies Open – Doubles =

Doubles
- 2013 Suzhou Ladies Open

Final
- Champions: (Hungary) Tímea Babos (Netherlands) Michaëlla Krajicek
- Runners-up: (China) Han Xinyun (Japan) Eri Hozumi
- Score: 6–2, 6–2

Events
Singles	Doubles
← 2012 ·	Suzhou Ladies Open	· 2014 →

Timea Bacsinszky and Caroline Garcia were the defending champions, but decided not to participate.

Tímea Babos and Michaëlla Krajicek won the title, defeating Han Xinyun and Eri Hozumi in the final 6–2, 6–2.

== Seeds ==
1. (Thailand) Tamarine Tanasugarn / (China) Zheng Saisai (semifinals)
2. (Chinese Taipei) Chan Chin-wei / (China) Xu Yifan (quarterfinals)
3. (Thailand) Noppawan Lertcheewakarn / (Thailand) Varatchaya Wongteanchai (quarterfinals)
4. (Thailand) Nicha Lertpitaksinchai / (Thailand) Peangtarn Plipuech (first round)

== Draw ==
=== Key ===
- Q = Qualifier
- WC = Wild card
- LL = Lucky loser
- Alt = Alternate
- SE = Special exempt
- PR = Protected ranking
- ITF = ITF entry
- JE = Junior exempt
- w/o = Walkover
- r = Retired
- d = Defaulted
- SR = Special ranking

First round
1	(Thailand) T Tanasugarn (China) S Zheng	6	6
(Japan) J Namigata (Japan) E Sema	3	4
(China) C Liu (China) X Wen	6	6
(China) N Zhang (China) Y Zhao	3	2
3	(Thailand) N Lertcheewakarn (Thailand) Vara Wongteanchai	6	3	[10]
WC	(China) R Tian (China) L Zhu	3	6	[4]
(China) X Han (Japan) E Hozumi	6	7^{7}
(Kazakhstan) Z Diyas (Hong Kong) L Zhang	4	6^{4}
(South Korea) S-j Jang (South Korea) S-r Lee	6	2	[10]
(Slovakia) M Hončová (France) A Lim	3	6	[8]
(Chinese Taipei) W-h Hsu (China) C Liang	6^{2}	7^{7}	[10]
4	(Thailand) N Lertpitaksinchai (Thailand) P Plipuech	7^{7}	6^{5}	[2]
(Japan) Y Sema (China) Y Zhou	4	3
(Hungary) T Babos (Netherlands) M Krajicek	6	6
(China) W Liu (China) Z Yan	4	6	[5]
2	(Chinese Taipei) C-w Chan (China) Y Xu	6	3	[10]

Quarterfinals
1	(Thailand) T Tanasugarn (China) S Zheng	6	6
(China) C Liu (China) X Wen	4	2
3	(Thailand) N Lertcheewakarn (Thailand) Vara Wongteanchai	0	4
(China) X Han (Japan) E Hozumi	6	6
(South Korea) S-j Jang (South Korea) S-r Lee	1	6	[4]
(Chinese Taipei) W-h Hsu (China) C Liang	6	4	[10]
(Hungary) T Babos (Netherlands) M Krajicek	6	6
2	(Chinese Taipei) C-w Chan (China) Y Xu	1	4

Semifinals
1	(Thailand) T Tanasugarn (China) S Zheng	1	2
(China) X Han (Japan) E Hozumi	6	6
(Chinese Taipei) W-h Hsu (China) C Liang	4	2
(Hungary) T Babos (Netherlands) M Krajicek	6	6

Final
(China) X Han (Japan) E Hozumi	2	2
(Hungary) T Babos (Netherlands) M Krajicek	6	6
