= 2018 Suzhou Ladies Open =

- Date: 15–21 October
- Edition: 7th
- Category: ITF Women's Circuit
- Prize money: $100,000
- Surface: Hard
- Location: Suzhou, China

Champions

Singles
- (China) Zheng Saisai

Doubles
- (Japan) Misaki Doi / (Japan) Nao Hibino
← 2017 ·	Suzhou Ladies Open	· 2019 →

The 2018 Suzhou Ladies Open was a professional tennis tournament played on outdoor hard courts. It was the seventh edition of the tournament and was part of the 2018 ITF Women's Circuit. It took place in Suzhou, China, on 15–21 October 2018.

== Singles main draw entrants ==
=== Seeds ===
Country	Player	Rank^{1}	Seed
CHN	Zheng Saisai	58	1
CHN	Wang Yafan	73	2
~~KAZ~~	~~Zarina Diyas~~	~~90~~	~~3~~
GBR	Katie Boulter	101	4
THA	Luksika Kumkhum	105	5
CHN	Zhu Lin	106	6
UKR	Anhelina Kalinina	116	7
RUS	Veronika Kudermetova	122	8

- ^{1} Rankings as of 8 October 2018.

=== Other entrants ===
The following players received a wildcard into the singles main draw:

- (China) Ren Jiaqi
- (China) Yang Zhaoxuan
- (China) Yuan Yi
- (China) Zhang Kailin

The following players received entry from the qualifying draw:

- (Oman) Fatma Al-Nabhani
- (Slovakia) Jana Čepelová
- (Canada) Gabriela Dabrowski
- (Thailand) Peangtarn Plipuech

The following players received entry as a lucky loser:

- (China) Jiang Xinyu
- (Japan) Haruka Kaji

== Champions ==
=== Singles ===
- (China) Zheng Saisai def. (Slovakia) Jana Čepelová, 7–5, 6–1

=== Doubles ===
- (Japan) Misaki Doi / (Japan) Nao Hibino def. (Thailand) Luksika Kumkhum / (Thailand) Peangtarn Plipuech, 6–2, 6–3
