= 2013 Suzhou Ladies Open =

- Date: 5–11 August
- Edition: 2nd
- Category: WTA 125K series
- Draw: 32S/16D
- Prize money: $125,000
- Surface: Hard
- Location: Suzhou, China

Champions

Singles
- (Israel) Shahar Pe'er

Doubles
- (Hungary) Tímea Babos / (Netherlands) Michaëlla Krajicek
← 2012 ·	Suzhou Ladies Open	· 2014 →

The 2013 Caoxijiu Suzhou Ladies Open was a professional tennis tournament played on hard courts. It was the second edition of the tournament which was part of the 2013 WTA 125K series. It took place in Suzhou, China, on 5–11 August 2013.

== Singles draw entrants ==
=== Seeds ===
Country	Player	Rank^{1}	Seed
HUN	Tímea Babos	103	1
JPN	Misaki Doi	106	2
ISR	Shahar Pe'er	109	3
CHN	Zhang Shuai	113	4
CHN	Duan Yingying	128	5
CHN	Zhou Yimiao	134	6
THA	Tamarine Tanasugarn	160	7
FRA	Alizé Lim	165	8

- ^{1} Rankings as of 29 July 2013

=== Other entrants ===
The following players received wildcards into the singles main draw:

- (China) Zhu Lin
- (China) Yang Zi
- (China) Liu Chang
- (China) Wang Yafan

The following players received entry from the qualifying draw:

- (China) Liu Fangzhou
- (China) Han Xinyun
- (Thailand) Peangtarn Plipuech
- (China) Hu Yueyue

The following player received entry into the singles main draw as a lucky loser:

- (South Korea) Lee So-ra

== Doubles draw entrants ==
=== Seeds ===
Country	Player	Country	Player	Rank	Seed
THA	Tamarine Tanasugarn	CHN	Zheng Saisai	101	1
TPE	Chan Chin-wei	CHN	Xu Yifan	306	2
THA	Noppawan Lertcheewakarn	THA	Varatchaya Wongteanchai	314	3
THA	Nicha Lertpitaksinchai	THA	Peangtarn Plipuech	342	4

=== Other entrants ===
The following pair received a wildcard into the doubles draw:

- (China) Tian Ran / (China) Zhu Lin

== Champions ==
=== Singles ===
- (Israel) Shahar Pe'er def. (China) Zheng Saisai 6–2, 2–6, 6–3

=== Doubles ===
- (Hungary) Tímea Babos / (Netherlands) Michaëlla Krajicek def. (China) Han Xinyun / (Japan) Eri Hozumi 6–2, 6–2
