= 2015 Suzhou Ladies Open =

- Date: 19–25 October
- Edition: 4th
- Category: ITF Women's Circuit
- Prize money: $50,000
- Surface: Hard
- Location: Suzhou, China

Champions

Singles
- (China) Zhang Kailin

Doubles
- (China) Yang Zhaoxuan / (China) Zhang Yuxuan
| ← 2014 · | Suzhou Ladies Open | · 2016 → |

The 2015 Suzhou Ladies Open was a professional tennis tournament played on outdoor hard courts. It was the fourth edition of the tournament and part of the 2015 ITF Women's Circuit, offering a total of $50,000 in prize money. It took place in Suzhou, China, on 19–25 October 2015.

== Singles main draw entrants ==
=== Seeds ===
| Country | Player | Rank^{1} | Seed |
|---|---|---|---|
| KAZ | Yulia Putintseva | 83 | 1 |
| RUS | Elizaveta Kulichkova | 103 | 2 |
| CHN | Wang Qiang | 104 | 3 |
| TPE | Hsieh Su-wei | 120 | 4 |
| CHN | Duan Yingying | 123 | 5 |
| CHN | Wang Yafan | 143 | 6 |
| CHN | Han Xinyun | 157 | 7 |
| CHN | Yang Zhaoxuan | 159 | 8 |

- ^{1} Rankings as of 12 October 2015

=== Other entrants ===
The following players received wildcards into the singles main draw:

- (China) Wang Yan
- (China) Xu Shilin
- (China) You Xiaodi
- (China) Yuan Yi

The following players received entry from the qualifying draw:

- (Croatia) Silvia Njirić
- (Slovakia) Chantal Škamlová
- (China) Wei Zhanlan
- (Hong Kong) Zhang Ling

== Champions ==
=== Singles ===
- (China) Zhang Kailin def. (China) Duan Yingying, 1–6, 6–3, 6–4

=== Doubles ===
- (China) Yang Zhaoxuan / (China) Zhang Yuxuan def. (China) Tian Ran / (China) Zhang Kailin, 7–6^{(7–4)}, 6–2
