= 2015 Suzhou Ladies Open – Singles =

Singles
- 2015 Suzhou Ladies Open

Final
- Champion: (China) Zhang Kailin
- Runner-up: (China) Duan Yingying
- Score: 1–6, 6–3, 6–4

Events
Singles	Doubles
← 2014 ·	Suzhou Ladies Open	· 2016 →

Anna-Lena Friedsam is the defending champion, but decided not to participate this year.

Zhang Kailin won the title, defeating Duan Yingying in an all-Chinese final, 1–6, 6–3, 6–4.

== Seeds ==
1. (Kazakhstan) Yulia Putintseva (quarterfinals)
2. (Russia) Elizaveta Kulichkova (second round)
3. (China) Wang Qiang (second round)
4. (Chinese Taipei) Hsieh Su-wei (first round)
5. (China) Duan Yingying (final)
6. (China) Wang Yafan (semifinals)
7. (China) Han Xinyun (first round)
8. (China) Yang Zhaoxuan (first round)

== Draw ==
=== Key ===
- Q = Qualifier
- WC = Wild card
- LL = Lucky loser
- Alt = Alternate
- SE = Special exempt
- PR = Protected ranking
- ITF = ITF entry
- JE = Junior exempt
- w/o = Walkover
- r = Retired
- d = Defaulted
- SR = Special ranking

=== Finals ===
Semifinals
5	(China) Duan Yingying	6	7^{9}
(Slovakia) Kristína Kučová	1	6^{7}
6	(China) Wang Yafan	5	0
(China) Zhang Kailin	7	6

Final
5	(China) Duan Yingying	6	3	4
(China) Zhang Kailin	1	6	6

=== Top half ===
First round
1	(Kazakhstan) Y Putintseva	6	6
Q	(Slovakia) C Škamlová	3	0
WC	(China) Y Yuan	0	1
WC	(China) Yan Wang	6	6
Q	(China) Z Wei	6	7^{7}
(Japan) K Okamura	4	6^{2}
(United Kingdom) E Webley-Smith	2	2
5	(China) Y Duan	6	6
3	(China) Q Wang	6	6
Q	(Hong Kong) L Zhang	1	0
(Serbia) D Erić	7	4	3
(Japan) H Kuwata	5	6	6
(South Korea) S-r Lee	6	6
Q	(Croatia) S Njirić	2	1
(Slovakia) K Kučová	6	6
8	(China) Z Yang	4	2

Second round
1	(Kazakhstan) Y Putintseva	6	6
WC	(China) Yan Wang	0	2
Q	(China) Z Wei	4	2
5	(China) Y Duan	6	6
3	(China) Q Wang	6	1	3
(Japan) H Kuwata	2	6	6
(South Korea) S-r Lee	1	0
(Slovakia) K Kučová	6	6

Quarterfinals
1	(Kazakhstan) Y Putintseva	4	1
5	(China) Y Duan	6	6
(Japan) H Kuwata	2	5
(Slovakia) K Kučová	6	7

Semifinals
5	(China) Y Duan	6	7^{9}
(Slovakia) K Kučová	1	6^{7}

=== Bottom half ===
First round
6	(China) Yaf Wang	1	6	6
WC	(China) S Xu	6	1	0
(China) Y Xu	7^{7}	6^{5}	6
(Uzbekistan) A Amanmuradova	6^{4}	7^{7}	3
(Russia) I Khromacheva	6	6
(Russia) A Komardina	4	4
(Russia) E Bychkova	6	5	6
4	(Chinese Taipei) S-w Hsieh	4	7	3
7	(China) X Han	6	2	4
(China) Jin Lu	3	6	6
WC	(China) X You	3	6	2
(China) K Zhang	6	3	6
(China) F Liu	5	0
(China) Yu Zhang	7	6
(Uzbekistan) S Sharipova	4	4
2	(Russia) E Kulichkova	6	6

Second round
6	(China) Yaf Wang	6	6
(China) Y Xu	1	0
(Russia) I Khromacheva	1	5
(Russia) E Bychkova	6	7
(China) Jin Lu	6^{4}	6	1
(China) K Zhang	7^{7}	2	6
(China) Yu Zhang	6	6
2	(Russia) E Kulichkova	1	4

Quarterfinals
6	(China) Yaf Wang	6	6
(Russia) E Bychkova	3	1
(China) K Zhang	6	7^{7}
(China) Yu Zhang	4	6^{2}

Semifinals
6	(China) Yaf Wang	5	0
(China) K Zhang	7	6
