= 2017 Suzhou Ladies Open =

- Date: 16–22 October
- Edition: 6th
- Category: ITF Women's Circuit
- Prize money: $60,000
- Surface: Hard
- Location: Suzhou, China

Champions

Singles
- (Italy) Sara Errani

Doubles
- (United States) Jacqueline Cako / (Serbia) Nina Stojanović
← 2016 ·	Suzhou Ladies Open	· 2018 →

The 2017 Suzhou Ladies Open was a professional tennis tournament played on outdoor hard courts. It was the sixth edition of the tournament and was part of the 2017 ITF Women's Circuit. It took place in Suzhou, China, on 16–22 October 2017.

== Singles main draw entrants ==
=== Seeds ===
Country	Player	Rank^{1}	Seed
JPN	Nao Hibino	92	1
JPN	Kurumi Nara	101	2
CHN	Zhu Lin	113	3
JPN	Miyu Kato	126	4
AUS	Lizette Cabrera	155	5
TUR	İpek Soylu	179	6
JPN	Eri Hozumi	185	7
CHN	Lu Jingjing	186	8

- ^{1} Rankings as of 9 October 2017.

=== Other entrants ===
The following players received a wildcard into the singles main draw:

- (China) Sun Xuliu
- (China) Wei Zhanlan
- (China) Yuan Yue
- (China) Zhang Yuxuan

The following players received entry from the qualifying draw:

- (Slovenia) Kaja Juvan
- (China) Ye Qiuyu
- (China) You Xiaodi
- (Hong Kong) Zhang Ling

== Champions ==
=== Singles ===
- (Italy) Sara Errani def. (China) Guo Hanyu, 6–1, 6–0

=== Doubles ===
- (United States) Jacqueline Cako / (Serbia) Nina Stojanović def. (Japan) Eri Hozumi / (Japan) Miyu Kato, 2–6, 7–5, [10–2]
