= 2012 ITF Women's Circuit – Suzhou =

- Date: 8–14 October
- Edition: 1st
- Location: Suzhou, China

Champions

Singles
- (Chinese Taipei) Hsieh Su-wei

Doubles
- (Switzerland) Timea Bacsinszky / (France) Caroline Garcia
ITF Women's Circuit – Suzhou	· 2013 →

The 2012 ITF Women's Circuit – Suzhou was a professional tennis tournament played on hard courts. It was the first edition of the tournament which was part of the 2012 ITF Women's Circuit. It took place in Suzhou, China, on 8–14 October 2012.

== WTA entrants ==
=== Seeds ===
Country	Player	Rank^{1}	Seed
TPE	Hsieh Su-wei	38	1
CHN	Peng Shuai	49	2
CRO	Donna Vekić	120	3
CHN	Zhang Shuai	143	4
CHN	Zheng Saisai	146	5
CHN	Duan Yingying	154	6
FRA	Caroline Garcia	165	7
TUR	Çağla Büyükakçay	184	8

- ^{1} Rankings as of 1 October 2012

=== Other entrants ===
The following players received wildcards into the singles main draw:

- (China) Tian Ran
- (China) Wang Yafan
- (China) Yang Zhaoxuan
- (China) Zhu Lin

The following players received entry from the qualifying draw:

- (China) Guo Lu
- (China) Liang Chen
- (China) Yang Zi
- (China) Zhang Yuxuan

== Champions ==
=== Singles ===
- (Chinese Taipei) Hsieh Su-wei def. (China) Duan Yingying 6–2, 6–2

=== Doubles ===
- (Switzerland) Timea Bacsinszky / (France) Caroline Garcia def. (China) Yang Zhaoxuan / (China) Zhao Yijing 7–5, 6–3
