= 2016 Suzhou Ladies Open =

- Date: 17–23 October
- Edition: 5th
- Category: ITF Women's Circuit
- Prize money: $50,000
- Surface: Hard
- Location: Suzhou, China

Champions

Singles
- (Chinese Taipei) Chang Kai-chen

Doubles
- (Japan) Hiroko Kuwata / (Japan) Akiko Omae
← 2015 ·	Suzhou Ladies Open	· 2017 →

The 2016 Suzhou Ladies Open was a professional tennis tournament played on outdoor hard courts. It was the 5th edition of the tournament and part of the 2016 ITF Women's Circuit, offering a total of $50,000 in prize money. It took place in Suzhou, China, on 17–23 October 2016.

== Singles main draw entrants ==
=== Seeds ===
Country	Player	Rank^{1}	Seed
POL	Magda Linette	98	1
GER	Tatjana Maria	109	2
CHN	Han Xinyun	115	3
CHN	Wang Yafan	125	4
CHN	Zhu Lin	147	5
THA	Luksika Kumkhum	150	6
TUR	İpek Soylu	153	7
UZB	Sabina Sharipova	155	8

- ^{1} Rankings as of 10 October 2016.

=== Other entrants ===
The following player received a wildcard into the singles main draw:

- (China) Gai Ao
- (China) Gao Xinyu
- (China) Wei Zhanlan
- (China) Xu Yifan

The following players received entry from the qualifying draw:

- (United States) Jacqueline Cako
- (South Korea) Lee So-ra
- (China) Sun Xuliu
- (China) Yuan Yue

The following players received entry by a lucky loser spot:

- (China) Jiang Xinyu

== Champions ==
=== Singles ===
- (Chinese Taipei) Chang Kai-chen def. (China) Wang Yafan, 4–6, 6–2, 6–1

=== Doubles ===
- (Japan) Hiroko Kuwata / (Japan) Akiko Omae def. (United States) Jacqueline Cako / (Uzbekistan) Sabina Sharipova, 6–1, 6–3
