= 2014 Suzhou Ladies Open =

- Date: 1–6 September
- Edition: 3rd
- Category: WTA 125K series
- Draw: 32S/16D
- Prize money: $125,000
- Surface: Hard
- Location: Suzhou, China

Champions

Singles
- (Germany) Anna-Lena Friedsam

Doubles
- (Chinese Taipei) Chan Chin-wei / (Chinese Taipei) Chuang Chia-jung
← 2013 ·	Suzhou Ladies Open	· 2015 →

The 2014 Caoxijiu Suzhou Ladies Open was a professional tennis tournament played on hard courts. It was the second edition of the tournament which was part of the 2014 WTA 125K series. It took place in Suzhou, China, on 1–6 September 2014.

== Singles draw entrants ==
=== Seeds ===
Country	Player	Rank^{1}	Seed
SVK	Jana Čepelová	65	1
AUT	Patricia Mayr-Achleitner	85	2
THA	Luksika Kumkhum	98	3
GER	Anna-Lena Friedsam	100	4
RUS	Ksenia Pervak	127	5
TUR	Çağla Büyükakçay	141	6
UKR	Kateryna Kozlova	146	7
CHN	Zheng Saisai	148	8

- ^{1} Rankings as of 25 August 2014.

=== Other entrants ===
The following players received wildcards into the singles main draw:

- (China) Li Yixuan
- (China) Liu Fangzhou
- (China) Yang Zhaoxuan
- (China) Zheng Saisai

There was no qualifying draw due to insufficient number of players

=== Withdrawals ===
Before the tournament

- (Czech Republic) Petra Cetkovská [replaced by Nadiia Kichenok]
- (Japan) Misaki Doi [replaced by Nigina Abduraimova]
- (Serbia) Vesna Dolonc [replaced by Kateryna Kozlova]
- (Romania) Alexandra Dulgheru [replaced by Duan Yingying]
- (Australia) Jarmila Gajdošová [replaced by Sofia Shapatava]
- (Israel) Julia Glushko [replaced by Magda Linette]
- (Serbia) Aleksandra Krunić [replaced by Risa Ozaki]
- (Russia) Alla Kudryavtseva [replaced by Petra Martić]
- (France) Pauline Parmentier [replaced by Eri Hozumi]
- (Poland) Katarzyna Piter [replaced by Elitsa Kostova]
- (Czech Republic) Kristýna Plíšková [replaced by Arina Rodionova]
- (Ukraine) Lesia Tsurenko [replaced by Su-Wei Hsieh]
- (Belgium) Alison Van Uytvanck [replaced by Misa Eguchi]
- (Belgium) Yanina Wickmayer [replaced by Lyudmyla Kichenok]

== Doubles draw entrants ==
=== Seeds ===
Country	Player	Country	Player	Rank	Seed
UKR	Lyudmyla Kichenok	UKR	Nadiia Kichenok	182	1
CRO	Petra Martić	AUS	Arina Rodionova	221	2
TPE	Chan Chin-wei	TPE	Chuang Chia-jung	233	3
THA	Nicha Lertpitaksinchai	THA	Peangtarn Plipuech	364	4

== Champions ==
=== Singles ===
- (Germany) Anna-Lena Friedsam def. (China) Duan Yingying 6–1, 6–3

=== Doubles ===
- (Chinese Taipei) Chan Chin-wei / (Chinese Taipei) Chuang Chia-jung def. (Japan) Misa Eguchi / (Japan) Eri Hozumi 6–1, 3–6, [10–7]
