= 2015 Suzhou Ladies Open – Doubles =

Doubles
- 2015 Suzhou Ladies Open

Final
- Champions: (China) Yang Zhaoxuan (China) Zhang Yuxuan
- Runners-up: (China) Tian Ran (China) Zhang Kailin
- Score: 7–6^{(7–4)}, 6–2

Events
Singles	Doubles
← 2014 ·	Suzhou Ladies Open	· 2016 →

Chan Chin-wei and Chuang Chia-jung were the defending champions, but chose not to participate.

Yang Zhaoxuan and Zhang Yuxuan won the title, defeating Tian Ran and Zhang Kailin in an all-Chinese final, 7–6^{(7–4)}, 6–2.

== Seeds ==
1. (Germany) Carolin Daniels / (Belarus) Lidziya Marozava (semifinals)
2. (Russia) Ksenia Lykina / (United Kingdom) Emily Webley-Smith (first round)
3. (China) Xu Shilin / (China) You Xiaodi (quarterfinals)
4. (Russia) Anastasiya Komardina / (Japan) Hiroko Kuwata (quarterfinals)

== Draw ==
=== Key ===
- Q = Qualifier
- WC = Wild card
- LL = Lucky loser
- Alt = Alternate
- SE = Special exempt
- PR = Protected ranking
- ITF = ITF entry
- JE = Junior exempt
- w/o = Walkover
- r = Retired
- d = Defaulted
- SR = Special ranking

=== Draw ===
First round
1	(Germany) C Daniels (Belarus) L Marozava	6	7
WC	(China) F Liu (China) Q Zhao	0	5
(China) A Gai (China) Jia Lu	2	3
(China) Yan Wang (China) F Xun	6	6
4	(Russia) A Komardina (Japan) H Kuwata	7^{8}	4	[11]
(South Korea) S-r Lee (Uzbekistan) S Sharipova	6^{6}	6	[9]
(China) R Tian (China) K Zhang	6	6
(China) J Chen (China) Yi Zhang	0	2
(Russia) E Bychkova (Japan) K Okamura	4	2
(Slovakia) K Kučová (Slovakia) C Škamlová	6	6
(China) Y Li (China) X Sun	2	4
3	(China) S Xu (China) X You	6	6
(China) Z Yang (China) Yu Zhang	6	3	[10]
(Russia) I Khromacheva (Croatia) S Njirić	2	6	[7]
(China) Jin Lu (Hong Kong) L Zhang	2	6	[15]
2	(Russia) K Lykina (United Kingdom) E Webley-Smith	6	2	[13]

Quarterfinals
1	(Germany) C Daniels (Belarus) L Marozava	6	6
(China) Yan Wang (China) F Xun	1	2
4	(Russia) A Komardina (Japan) H Kuwata	3	1
(China) R Tian (China) K Zhang	6	6
(Slovakia) K Kučová (Slovakia) C Škamlová	6	7^{7}
3	(China) S Xu (China) X You	0	6^{1}
(China) Z Yang (China) Yu Zhang	5	6	[10]
(China) Jin Lu (Hong Kong) L Zhang	7	1	[7]

Semifinals
1	(Germany) C Daniels (Belarus) L Marozava	2	7^{8}	[9]
(China) R Tian (China) K Zhang	6	6^{6}	[11]
(Slovakia) K Kučová (Slovakia) C Škamlová	4	2
(China) Z Yang (China) Yu Zhang	6	6

Final
(China) R Tian (China) K Zhang	6^{4}	2
(China) Z Yang (China) Yu Zhang	7^{7}	6
