= 2018 Suzhou Ladies Open – Singles =

Singles
- 2018 Suzhou Ladies Open

Final
- Champion: (China) Zheng Saisai
- Runner-up: (Slovakia) Jana Čepelová
- Score: 7–5, 6–1

Events
Singles	Doubles
← 2017 ·	Suzhou Ladies Open	· 2019 →

Sara Errani was the defending champion, but was unable to participate due to a doping suspension.

Zheng Saisai won the title, defeating Jana Čepelová in the final, 7–5, 6–1.

== Seeds ==
1. (China) Zheng Saisai (champion)
2. (China) Wang Yafan (second round)
3. (Kazakhstan) Zarina Diyas (withdrew)
4. (United Kingdom) Katie Boulter (quarterfinals, retired)
5. (Thailand) Luksika Kumkhum (second round)
6. (China) Zhu Lin (second round)
7. (Ukraine) Anhelina Kalinina (semifinals)
8. (Russia) Veronika Kudermetova (first round, retired)

== Draw ==
=== Key ===
- Q = Qualifier
- WC = Wild card
- LL = Lucky loser
- Alt = Alternate
- SE = Special exempt
- PR = Protected ranking
- ITF = ITF entry
- JE = Junior exempt
- w/o = Walkover
- r = Retired
- d = Defaulted
- SR = Special ranking

=== Finals ===
Semifinals
1	(China) Zheng Saisai	6	3
(Bulgaria) Viktoriya Tomova	4	3^{r}
Q	(Slovakia) Jana Čepelová	6^{5}	6	7^{7}
7	(Ukraine) Anhelina Kalinina	7^{7}	1	6^{2}

Final
1	(China) Zheng Saisai	7	6
Q	(Slovakia) Jana Čepelová	5	1

=== Top half ===
First round
1	(China) S Zheng	6	6
WC	(China) Yi Yuan	0	1
(China) Y Duan	6	6
(Canada) C Zhao	3	1
(Australia) Ar Rodionova	6	6
WC	(China) Z Yang	3	2
(India) K Thandi	0	0
6	(China) L Zhu	6	6
4	(United Kingdom) K Boulter	6	6
(Japan) M Doi	4	2
(China) Jia Lu	6	6
LL	(China) X Jiang	1	0
(United Kingdom) K Swan	6	7
WC	(China) J Ren	4	5
(Bulgaria) V Tomova	6	3
8	(Russia) V Kudermetova	4	0^{r}

Second round
1	(China) S Zheng	6	6
(China) Y Duan	2	4
(Australia) Ar Rodionova	6	6
6	(China) L Zhu	2	4
4	(United Kingdom) K Boulter	6	6
(China) Jia Lu	2	2
(United Kingdom) K Swan	3	7^{7}	3
(Bulgaria) V Tomova	6	6^{4}	6

Quarterfinals
1	(China) S Zheng	6	6
(Australia) Ar Rodionova	2	1
4	(United Kingdom) K Boulter	4	0^{r}
(Bulgaria) V Tomova	6	0

Semifinals
1	(China) S Zheng	6	3
(Bulgaria) V Tomova	4	3^{r}

=== Bottom half ===
First round
5	(Thailand) L Kumkhum	4	6	6
Q	(Oman) F Al-Nabhani	6	2	4
(India) A Raina	1	2
Q	(Slovakia) J Čepelová	6	6
(Japan) N Hibino	6^{6}	6	6
(Czech Republic) B Krejčíková	7^{8}	3	4
(China) F Liu	2	0
Q	(Thailand) P Plipuech	6	6
7	(Ukraine) A Kalinina	7^{7}	6
(China) F Xun	6^{2}	0
LL	(Japan) H Kaji	3	6	6
(Israel) J Glushko	6	4	3
WC	(China) K Zhang	6	2	5
(China) X Han	1	6	7
Q	(Canada) G Dabrowski	2	3
2	(China) Y Wang	6	6

Second round
5	(Thailand) L Kumkhum	3	3
Q	(Slovakia) J Čepelová	6	6
(Japan) N Hibino	7^{7}	6
Q	(Thailand) P Plipuech	6^{1}	4
7	(Ukraine) A Kalinina	6	6
LL	(Japan) H Kaji	1	0
(China) X Han	6	6^{4}	6
2	(China) Y Wang	3	7^{7}	4

Quarterfinals
Q	(Slovakia) J Čepelová	4	7	6
(Japan) N Hibino	6	5	3
7	(Ukraine) A Kalinina	6^{6}	6	0
(China) X Han	7^{8}	1	0^{r}

Semifinals
Q	(Slovakia) J Čepelová	6^{5}	6	7^{7}
7	(Ukraine) A Kalinina	7^{7}	1	6^{2}
