= 2012 ITF Women's Circuit – Suzhou – Singles =

Suzhou – Singles
- 2012 ITF Women's Circuit – Suzhou

Final
- Champion: (Chinese Taipei) Hsieh Su-wei
- Runner-up: (China) Duan Yingying
- Score: 6–2, 6–2

Events
Singles	Doubles
- ITF Women's Circuit – Suzhou

This was a new event in 2012.

Hsieh Su-wei won the title defeating Duan Yingying in the final 6–2, 6–2.

== Seeds ==
1. (Chinese Taipei) Hsieh Su-wei (champion)
2. (China) Peng Shuai (semifinals)
3. (Croatia) Donna Vekić (semifinals)
4. (China) Zhang Shuai (quarterfinals)
5. (China) Zheng Saisai (second round)
6. (China) Duan Yingying (final)
7. (France) Caroline Garcia (quarterfinals)
8. (Turkey) Çağla Büyükakçay (second round)

== Main draw ==
Key

- Q = Qualifier
- WC = Wild card
- LL = Lucky loser
- Alt = Alternate
- ITF = ITF entry
- PR = Protected ranking
- SR = Special ranking
- SE = Special exempt
- JE = Junior exempt
- JR = Junior Accelerator Programme entrant
- CO = College Accelerator Programme entrant
- NG = Next Gen Accelerator Program entrant
- w/o = Walkover
- r = Retired
- d = Defaulted

=== Finals ===
Semifinals
1	(Chinese Taipei) Hsieh Su-wei	7^{8}	6
3	(Croatia) Donna Vekić	6^{6}	1
6	(China) Duan Yingying	w/o
2	(China) Peng Shuai

Final
1	(Chinese Taipei) Hsieh Su-wei	6	6
6	(China) Duan Yingying	2	2

=== Top half ===
First round
1	(Chinese Taipei) S-w Hsieh	6	6^{3}	6
WC	(China) R Tian	0	7^{7}	1
(Australia) M Adamczak	7	4	4
(China) X Han	5	6	6
(China) S Sun	6	4	6
(Hong Kong) W-y Chan	1	6	4
Q	(China) L Guo	5	3
8	(Turkey) Ç Büyükakçay	7	6
3	(Croatia) D Vekić	6	6
(China) Y Hu	3	4
(Slovakia) M Hončová	6	6
(Chinese Taipei) C-w Chan	2	3
(China) H Tang	6^{2}	3
WC	(China) Zh Yang	7^{7}	6
WC	(China) L Zhu	3	3
7	(France) C Garcia	6	6

Second round
1	(Chinese Taipei) S-w Hsieh	6	5	6
(China) X Han	1	7	2
(China) S Sun	6	1	6
8	(Turkey) Ç Büyükakçay	4	6	3
3	(Croatia) D Vekić	3	6	6
(Slovakia) M Hončová	6	4	2
WC	(China) Zh Yang	5	3
7	(France) C Garcia	7	6

Quarterfinals
1	(Chinese Taipei) S-w Hsieh	6	6
(China) S Sun	0	3
3	(Croatia) D Vekić	2	6	6
7	(France) C Garcia	6	2	2

Semifinals
1	(Chinese Taipei) S-w Hsieh	7^{8}	6
3	(Croatia) D Vekić	6^{6}	1

=== Bottom half ===
First round
6	(China) Y Duan	6	6
(Hong Kong) L Zhang	3	3
(China) Y Zhao	6	3	1
(China) C Liu	4	6	6
Q	(China) C Liang	3	6	6
(China) Y Xu	6	2	3
Q	(China) Zi Yang	0	4
4	(China) S Zhang	6	6
5	(China) S Zheng	6	6
(United States) T Luzhanska	1	4
(China) X Wen	4	1
Q	(China) Y Zhang	6	6
(South Korea) S-j Jang	1	2
(Switzerland) T Bacsinszky	6	6
WC	(China) Y Wang	1	2
2	(China) S Peng	6	6

Second round
6	(China) Y Duan	6	6
(China) C Liu	2	0
Q	(China) C Liang	3	0
4	(China) S Zhang	6	6
5	(China) S Zheng	6	4	5
Q	(China) Y Zhang	4	6	7
(Switzerland) T Bacsinszky	6^{1}	3
2	(China) S Peng	7^{7}	6

Quarterfinals
6	(China) Y Duan	5	6	7
4	(China) S Zhang	7	3	5
Q	(China) Y Zhang	2	3
2	(China) S Peng	6	6

Semifinals
6	(China) Y Duan	w/o
2	(China) S Peng
