= 2016 Suzhou Ladies Open – Doubles =

Doubles
- 2016 Suzhou Ladies Open

Final
- Champions: (Japan) Hiroko Kuwata (Japan) Akiko Omae
- Runners-up: (United States) Jacqueline Cako (Uzbekistan) Sabina Sharipova
- Score: 6–1, 6–3

Events
Singles	Doubles
← 2015 ·	Suzhou Ladies Open	· 2017 →

Yang Zhaoxuan and Zhang Yuxuan were the defending champions, but both players chose not to participate.

Hiroko Kuwata and Akiko Omae won the title, defeating Jacqueline Cako and Sabina Sharipova in the final, 6–1, 6–3.

== Seeds ==
1. (China) Han Xinyun / (Turkey) İpek Soylu (semifinals)
2. (Bulgaria) Aleksandrina Naydenova / (Poland) Katarzyna Piter (semifinals)
3. (Japan) Hiroko Kuwata / (Japan) Akiko Omae (champions)
4. (Thailand) Nicha Lertpitaksinchai / (Thailand) Peangtarn Plipuech (first round)

== Draw ==
=== Key ===
- Q = Qualifier
- WC = Wild card
- LL = Lucky loser
- Alt = Alternate
- SE = Special exempt
- PR = Protected ranking
- ITF = ITF entry
- JE = Junior exempt
- w/o = Walkover
- r = Retired
- d = Defaulted
- SR = Special ranking

First round
1	(China) X Han (Turkey) İ Soylu	6	6
(China) X Gao (China) F Xun	3	0
(Chinese Taipei) K-c Chang (Serbia) N Stojanović	6	6
WC	(China) Z Sun (China) M Zhou	3	2
4	(Thailand) N Lertpitaksinchai (Thailand) Pe Plipuech	3	3
(United States) J Cako (Uzbekistan) S Sharipova	6	6
WC	(China) Yu Wang (China) Z Wei	2	3
(China) C Liu (China) R Tian	6	6
(South Korea) N-l Han (South Korea) S-r Lee
(China) Q Zhao (China) L Zhu	w/o
(Thailand) K Buayam (Thailand) L Kumkhum	2	7^{7}	[2]
3	(Japan) H Kuwata (Japan) A Omae	6	6^{4}	[10]
(China) Y Li (China) Ya Wang	2	3
(Chinese Taipei) C-w Chan (Chinese Taipei) Y-h Lee	6	6
(China) X Jiang (China) J Kang	6	3	[8]
2	(Bulgaria) A Naydenova (Poland) K Piter	4	6	[10]

Quarterfinals
1	(China) X Han (Turkey) İ Soylu	7^{7}	2	[10]
(Chinese Taipei) K-c Chang (Serbia) N Stojanović	6^{5}	6	[7]
(United States) J Cako (Uzbekistan) S Sharipova	6	6
(China) C Liu (China) R Tian	1	3
(China) Q Zhao (China) L Zhu	0	5
3	(Japan) H Kuwata (Japan) A Omae	6	7
(Chinese Taipei) C-w Chan (Chinese Taipei) Y-h Lee	6	2	[12]
2	(Bulgaria) A Naydenova (Poland) K Piter	2	6	[14]

Semifinals
1	(China) X Han (Turkey) İ Soylu	2	2
(United States) J Cako (Uzbekistan) S Sharipova	6	6
3	(Japan) H Kuwata (Japan) A Omae	3	6	[10]
2	(Bulgaria) A Naydenova (Poland) K Piter	6	1	[5]

Final
(United States) J Cako (Uzbekistan) S Sharipova	1	3
3	(Japan) H Kuwata (Japan) A Omae	6	6
