= 2016 Suzhou Ladies Open – Singles =

Singles
- 2016 Suzhou Ladies Open

Final
- Champion: (Chinese Taipei) Chang Kai-chen
- Runner-up: (China) Wang Yafan
- Score: 4–6, 6–2, 6–1

Events
Singles	Doubles
← 2015 ·	Suzhou Ladies Open	· 2017 →

Zhang Kailin was the defending champion, but chose not to participate.

Chang Kai-chen won the title, defeating Wang Yafan in the final, 4–6, 6–2, 6–1.

== Seeds ==
1. (Poland) Magda Linette (second round, retired)
2. (Germany) Tatjana Maria (quarterfinals)
3. (China) Han Xinyun (first round)
4. (China) Wang Yafan (final)
5. (China) Zhu Lin (first round)
6. (Thailand) Luksika Kumkhum (second round)
7. (Turkey) İpek Soylu (first round)
8. (Uzbekistan) Sabina Sharipova (first round)

== Main draw ==
=== Key ===
- Q = Qualifier
- WC = Wild card
- LL = Lucky loser
- Alt = Alternate
- SE = Special exempt
- PR = Protected ranking
- ITF = ITF entry
- JE = Junior exempt
- w/o = Walkover
- r = Retired
- d = Defaulted
- SR = Special ranking

=== Finals ===
Semifinals
(Poland) Katarzyna Piter	5	4
4	(China) Wang Yafan	7	6
WC	(China) Xu Yifan	3	0
(Chinese Taipei) Chang Kai-chen	6	6

Final
4	(China) Wang Yafan	6	2	1
(Chinese Taipei) Chang Kai-chen	4	6	6

=== Top half ===
First round
1	(Poland) M Linette	6	6
(Norway) M Stokke	3	1
(Japan) H Kuwata	6	7
(China) F Xun	2	5
(Poland) K Piter	6	5	6
WC	(China) A Gai	0	7	1
(Serbia) N Stojanović	6	6
7	(Turkey) İ Soylu	2	4
4	(China) Y Wang	6	6
(Thailand) N Lertpitaksinchai	4	1
Q	(China) X Sun	4	6	6
LL	(China) X Jiang	6	1	1
WC	(China) Z Wei	6	2	6^{4}
(Chinese Taipei) Y-h Lee	4	6	7^{7}
(South Korea) N-l Han	5	0^{r}
6	(Thailand) L Kumkhum	7	0

Second round
1	(Poland) M Linette	6	3^{r}
(Japan) H Kuwata	4	5
(Poland) K Piter	6	3	6
(Serbia) N Stojanović	4	6	4
4	(China) Y Wang	6	6
Q	(China) X Sun	3	2
(Chinese Taipei) Y-h Lee	7	6
6	(Thailand) L Kumkhum	5	4

Quarterfinals
(Japan) H Kuwata	5	6^{2}
(Poland) K Piter	7	7^{7}
4	(China) Y Wang	7	6
(Chinese Taipei) Y-h Lee	5	3

Semifinals
(Poland) K Piter	5	4
4	(China) Y Wang	7	6

=== Bottom half ===
First round
5	(China) L Zhu	1	6	4
(China) C Liu	6	2	6
Q	(United States) J Cako	3	6	6
Q	(South Korea) S-r Lee	6	1	2
(Thailand) Pe Plipuech	6	6
WC	(China) X Gao	4	4
WC	(China) Y Xu	7	7
3	(China) X Han	5	5
8	(Uzbekistan) S Sharipova	6^{6}	1
(Chinese Taipei) K-c Chang	7^{8}	6
(Japan) A Omae	3	1
(Bulgaria) A Naydenova	6	6
(China) R Tian	3	6	2
(Georgia (country)) S Shapatava	6	0	0^{r}
Q	(China) Y Yuan	2	0
2	(Germany) T Maria	6	6

Second round
(China) C Liu	6	6
Q	(United States) J Cako	2	0
(Thailand) Pe Plipuech	3	4
WC	(China) Y Xu	6	6
(Chinese Taipei) K-c Chang	6	6
(Bulgaria) A Naydenova	2	4
(China) R Tian	4	2
2	(Germany) T Maria	6	6

Quarterfinals
(China) C Liu	3	3
WC	(China) Y Xu	6	6
(Chinese Taipei) K-c Chang	7	6
2	(Germany) T Maria	5	2

Semifinals
WC	(China) Y Xu	3	0
(Chinese Taipei) K-c Chang	6	6
