= 2017 Suzhou Ladies Open – Singles =

Singles
- 2017 Suzhou Ladies Open

Final
- Champion: (Italy) Sara Errani
- Runner-up: (China) Guo Hanyu
- Score: 6–1, 6–0

Events
Singles	Doubles
← 2016 ·	Suzhou Ladies Open	· 2018 →

Chang Kai-chen was the defending champion, but chose not to participate.

Sara Errani won the title, defeating Guo Hanyu in the final, 6–1, 6–0.

== Seeds ==
1. (Japan) Nao Hibino (quarterfinals)
2. (Japan) Kurumi Nara (semifinals)
3. (China) Zhu Lin (second round)
4. (Japan) Miyu Kato (first round)
5. (Australia) Lizette Cabrera (quarterfinals)
6. (Turkey) İpek Soylu (first round)
7. (Japan) Eri Hozumi (first round)
8. (China) Lu Jingjing (quarterfinals)

== Draw ==
=== Key ===
- Q = Qualifier
- WC = Wild card
- LL = Lucky loser
- Alt = Alternate
- SE = Special exempt
- PR = Protected ranking
- ITF = ITF entry
- JE = Junior exempt
- w/o = Walkover
- r = Retired
- d = Defaulted
- SR = Special ranking

=== Finals ===
Semifinals
(China) Guo Hanyu	6	6
(Serbia) Nina Stojanović	3	4
(Italy) Sara Errani	3	6	6
2	(Japan) Kurumi Nara	6	3	3

Final
(China) Guo Hanyu	1	0
(Italy) Sara Errani	6	6

=== Top half ===
First round
1	(Japan) N Hibino	6	6
(China) J Kang	1	2
WC	(China) Z Wei	4	7^{7}	3
Q	(Hong Kong) L Zhang	6	6^{5}	6
(India) A Raina	3	0
(China) H Guo	6	6
WC	(China) Y Yuan	6	7^{9}
6	(Turkey) İ Soylu	4	6^{7}
3	(China) L Zhu	6	6
(Slovenia) D Jakupović	4	4
(Serbia) N Stojanović	6	6
WC	(China) X Sun	3	2
(China) X Gao	5	2
Q	(China) X You	7	6
(Australia) P Hon	1	1
5	(Australia) L Cabrera	6	6

Second round
1	(Japan) N Hibino	6	6
Q	(Hong Kong) L Zhang	0	0
(China) H Guo	2
WC	(China) Y Yuan	1^{r}
3	(China) L Zhu	4	6	5
(Serbia) N Stojanović	6	1	7
Q	(China) X You	6^{5}	4
5	(Australia) L Cabrera	7^{7}	6

Quarterfinals
1	(Japan) N Hibino	6	4	4
(China) H Guo	2	6	6
(Serbia) N Stojanović	6	7^{7}
5	(Australia) L Cabrera	4	6^{2}

Semifinals
(China) H Guo	6	6
(Serbia) N Stojanović	3	4

=== Bottom half ===
First round
7	(Japan) E Hozumi	3	1
(Israel) J Glushko	6	6
(Italy) S Errani	6	6
(United States) J Elie	3	3
Q	(China) Q Ye	2	6	6
(United States) J Cako	6	3	2
WC	(China) Y Zhang	6	1	7^{7}
4	(Japan) M Kato	4	6	6^{2}
8	(China) Jin Lu	6	6
(China) K Zhang	4	1
(Japan) R Sawayanagi	3	6	7
(United Kingdom) L Robson	6	4	5
Q	(Slovenia) K Juvan	6	6
(Japan) H Kuwata	2	1
(China) F Xun	3	2
2	(Japan) K Nara	6	6

Second round
(Israel) J Glushko	2	7^{7}	2
(Italy) S Errani	6	6^{5}	6
Q	(China) Q Ye	7	3	4
WC	(China) Y Zhang	5	6	6
8	(China) Jin Lu	6	6
(Japan) R Sawayanagi	1	4
Q	(Slovenia) K Juvan	1	2
2	(Japan) K Nara	6	6

Quarterfinals
(Italy) S Errani	6	6
WC	(China) Y Zhang	2	1
8	(China) Jin Lu	6	5	2
2	(Japan) K Nara	2	7	6

Semifinals
(Italy) S Errani	3	6	6
2	(Japan) K Nara	6	3	3
