= 2017 Suzhou Ladies Open – Doubles =

Doubles
- 2017 Suzhou Ladies Open

Final
- Champion: (United States) Jacqueline Cako (Serbia) Nina Stojanović
- Runner-up: (Japan) Eri Hozumi (Japan) Miyu Kato
- Score: 2–6, 7–5, [10–2]

Events
Singles	Doubles
← 2016 ·	Suzhou Ladies Open	· 2018 →

Hiroko Kuwata and Akiko Omae were the defending champions, but Omae chose not to participate. Kuwata played alongside Laura Robson, but they lost in the semifinals to Eri Hozumi and Miyu Kato.

Jacqueline Cako and Nina Stojanović won the title after defeating Hozumi and Kato 2–6, 7–5, [10–2] in the final.

== Seeds ==
1. (Japan) Eri Hozumi / (Japan) Miyu Kato (final)
2. (United States) Jacqueline Cako / (Serbia) Nina Stojanović (champions)
3. (Japan) Hiroko Kuwata / (United Kingdom) Laura Robson (semifinals)
4. (Slovenia) Dalila Jakupović / (India) Ankita Raina (first round)

== Draw ==
=== Key ===
- Q = Qualifier
- WC = Wild card
- LL = Lucky loser
- Alt = Alternate
- SE = Special exempt
- PR = Protected ranking
- ITF = ITF entry
- JE = Junior exempt
- w/o = Walkover
- r = Retired
- d = Defaulted
- SR = Special ranking

First round
1	(Japan) E Hozumi (Japan) M Kato	6	6
(China) Jia Lu (China) R Meng	0	2
(Israel) J Glushko (Australia) P Hon	6	6
WC	(China) S Liu (China) W Zhu	1	0
3	(Japan) H Kuwata (United Kingdom) L Robson	6	7
Alt	(China) Y Yuan (China) J Zang	2	5
(China) X Sun (China) Z Sun	5	0
(China) X You (China) L Zhu	7	6
(China) X Gao (China) F Xun	2	6	[10]
(China) J Chen (China) S Feng	6	4	[2]
(China) X Jiang (China) J Kang	6	6
4	(Slovenia) D Jakupović (India) A Raina	1	1
(Japan) M Eguchi (United States) J Elie	5	7	[10]
(China) Z Wei (China) W Zheng	7	5	[3]
(China) H Guo (China) Q Ye	6	6^{5}	[6]
2	(United States) J Cako (Serbia) N Stojanović	4	7^{7}	[10]

Quarterfinals
1	(Japan) E Hozumi (Japan) M Kato	7^{7}	6
(Israel) J Glushko (Australia) P Hon	6^{4}	3
3	(Japan) H Kuwata (United Kingdom) L Robson	2
(China) X You (China) L Zhu	1^{r}
(China) X Gao (China) F Xun	5	7^{7}	[10]
(China) X Jiang (China) J Kang	7	6^{1}	[6]
(Japan) M Eguchi (United States) J Elie	6	3	[12]
2	(United States) J Cako (Serbia) N Stojanović	2	6	[14]

Semifinals
1	(Japan) E Hozumi (Japan) M Kato	6	6
3	(Japan) H Kuwata (United Kingdom) L Robson	2	0
(China) X Gao (China) F Xun	7	2	[7]
2	(United States) J Cako (Serbia) N Stojanović	5	6	[10]

Final
1	(Japan) E Hozumi (Japan) M Kato	6	5	[2]
2	(United States) J Cako (Serbia) N Stojanović	2	7	[10]
