= 2012 ITF Women's Circuit – Suzhou – Doubles =

Suzhou – Doubles
- 2012 ITF Women's Circuit – Suzhou

Final
- Champions: (Switzerland) Timea Bacsinszky (France) Caroline Garcia
- Runners-up: (China) Yang Zhaoxuan (China) Zhao Yijing
- Score: 7–5, 6–3

Events
Singles	Doubles
- ITF Women's Circuit – Suzhou

This was a new event in 2012.

Timea Bacsinszky and Caroline Garcia won the title defeating Yang Zhaoxuan and Zhao Yijing in the final 7–5, 6–3.

== Seeds ==
1. (China) Han Xinyun / (China) Liu Wanting (first round)
2. (United States) Tetiana Luzhanska / (China) Zheng Saisai (semifinals)
3. (China) Liang Chen / (China) Sun Shengnan (quarterfinals)
4. (China) Duan Yingying / (China) Zhang Shuai (quarterfinals)

== Draw ==
Key

- Q = Qualifier
- WC = Wild card
- LL = Lucky loser
- Alt = Alternate
- ITF = ITF entry
- PR = Protected ranking
- SR = Special ranking
- SE = Special exempt
- JE = Junior exempt
- JR = Junior Accelerator Programme entrant
- CO = College Accelerator Programme entrant
- NG = Next Gen Accelerator Program entrant
- w/o = Walkover
- r = Retired
- d = Defaulted

=== Draw ===
First round
1	(China) X Han (China) W Liu	4	4
WC	(China) T Li (China) X Wen	6	6
(Chinese Taipei) C-w Chan (China) C Liu	6	6
WC	(China) Y Zhang (China) Q Zhao	2	4
4	(China) Y Duan (China) S Zhang	6	6
(Chinese Taipei) S-y Hsieh (China) Y Hu	2	3
(Hong Kong) W-y Chan (South Korea) N-l Han	6	6^{1}	[8]
(China) Z Yang (China) Y Zhao	3	7^{7}	[10]
(China) Y Wang (China) A Zhu	4	1
(Switzerland) T Bacsinszky (France) C Garcia	6	6
(Australia) M Adamczak (Turkey) Ç Büyükakçay	3	1
3	(China) C Liang (China) S Sun	6	6
WC	(China) Z Hou (China) L Zhu	2	1
(China) Y Xu (Hong Kong) L Zhang	6	6
(China) H Tang (China) R Tian	6	3	[4]
2	(United States) T Luzhanska (China) S Zheng	1	6	[10]

Quarterfinals
WC	(China) T Li (China) X Wen	1	4
(Chinese Taipei) C-w Chan (China) C Liu	6	6
4	(China) Y Duan (China) S Zhang	6^{7}	6	[7]
(China) Z Yang (China) Y Zhao	7^{9}	4	[10]
(Switzerland) T Bacsinszky (France) C Garcia	6	6
3	(China) C Liang (China) S Sun	4	3
(China) Y Xu (Hong Kong) L Zhang	4	2
2	(United States) T Luzhanska (China) S Zheng	6	6

Semifinals
(Chinese Taipei) C-w Chan (China) C Liu	1	3
(China) Z Yang (China) Y Zhao	6	6
(Switzerland) T Bacsinszky (France) C Garcia	6	3	[10]
2	(United States) T Luzhanska (China) S Zheng	4	6	[8]

Finals
(China) Z Yang (China) Y Zhao	5	3
(Switzerland) T Bacsinszky (France) C Garcia	7	6
