= 2018 Suzhou Ladies Open – Doubles =

Doubles
- 2018 Suzhou Ladies Open

Final
- Champions: (Japan) Misaki Doi (Japan) Nao Hibino
- Runners-up: (Thailand) Luksika Kumkhum (Thailand) Peangtarn Plipuech
- Score: 6–2, 6–3

Events
Singles	Doubles
← 2017 ·	Suzhou Ladies Open	· 2019 →

Jacqueline Cako and Nina Stojanović were the defending champions, but Stojanović chose not participate. Cako played alongside Prarthana Thombare, but lost in the quarterfinals to Guo Hanyu and Xun Fangying.

Misaki Doi and Nao Hibino won the title, defeating Luksika Kumkhum and Peangtarn Plipuech in the final, 6–2, 6–3.

== Seeds ==
1. (Russia) Natela Dzalamidze / (Russia) Veronika Kudermetova (semifinals)
2. (Japan) Misaki Doi / (Japan) Nao Hibino (champions)
3. (China) Jiang Xinyu / (China) Tang Qianhui (quarterfinals)
4. (United States) Jacqueline Cako / (India) Prarthana Thombare (quarterfinals)

== Draw ==
=== Key ===
- Q = Qualifier
- WC = Wild card
- LL = Lucky loser
- Alt = Alternate
- SE = Special exempt
- PR = Protected ranking
- ITF = ITF entry
- JE = Junior exempt
- w/o = Walkover
- r = Retired
- d = Defaulted
- SR = Special ranking

=== Draw ===
First round
1	(Russia) N Dzalamidze (Russia) V Kudermetova	6	6
(India) A Raina (United Kingdom) E Webley-Smith	4	0
WC	(China) Jiax Lu (China) M Wu	6	4	[10]
(China) Jiaj Lu (India) K Thandi	3	6	[8]
3	(China) X Jiang (China) Q Tang	6	7
(Israel) J Glushko (Australia) Ar Rodionova	2	5
(Thailand) L Kumkhum (Thailand) P Plipuech	6	6
WC	(China) X Sun (China) Q Zhao	0	3
(China) H Guo (China) F Xun	6	6
(China) Q Ye (China) Yi Zhang	4	2
WC	(China) Yi Yuan (China) W Zhu	1	0
4	(United States) J Cako (India) P Thombare	6	6
(Hong Kong) K-y Ng (China) S Zheng	3	4
(China) S Feng (China) J Kang	6	6
(Chinese Taipei) S-y Hsieh (China) X You	3	3
2	(Japan) M Doi (Japan) N Hibino	6	6

Quarterfinals
1	(Russia) N Dzalamidze (Russia) V Kudermetova	6	6
WC	(China) Jiax Lu (China) M Wu	2	1
3	(China) X Jiang (China) Q Tang	2	3
(Thailand) L Kumkhum (Thailand) P Plipuech	6	6
(China) H Guo (China) F Xun	6	6^{4}	[10]
4	(United States) J Cako (India) P Thombare	4	7^{7}	[8]
(China) S Feng (China) J Kang	4	2
2	(Japan) M Doi (Japan) N Hibino	6	6

Semifinals
1	(Russia) N Dzalamidze (Russia) V Kudermetova	2	6	[2]
(Thailand) L Kumkhum (Thailand) P Plipuech	6	2	[10]
(China) H Guo (China) F Xun	4	1
2	(Japan) M Doi (Japan) N Hibino	6	6

Final
(Thailand) L Kumkhum (Thailand) P Plipuech	2	3
2	(Japan) M Doi (Japan) N Hibino	6	6
