= 2014 Suzhou Ladies Open – Doubles =

Doubles
- 2014 Suzhou Ladies Open

Final
- Champions: (Chinese Taipei) Chan Chin-wei (Chinese Taipei) Chuang Chia-jung
- Runners-up: (Japan) Misa Eguchi (Japan) Eri Hozumi
- Score: 6–1, 3–6, [10–7]

Events
Singles	Doubles
- Suzhou Ladies Open

Tímea Babos and Michaëlla Krajicek were the defending champions, having won the event in 2013, however both players chose not to participate.

Taiwanese duo Chan Chin-wei and Chuang Chia-jung won the title, defeating Japanese duo Misa Eguchi and Eri Hozumi in the final, 6–1, 3–6, [10–7].

== Seeds ==
1. (Ukraine) Lyudmyla Kichenok / (Ukraine) Nadiia Kichenok (quarterfinals)
2. (Croatia) Petra Martić / (Australia) Arina Rodionova (semifinals)
3. (Chinese Taipei) Chan Chin-wei / (Chinese Taipei) Chuang Chia-jung (champions)
4. (Thailand) Nicha Lertpitaksinchai / (Thailand) Peangtarn Plipuech (first round)

== Draw ==
Key

- Q = Qualifier
- WC = Wild card
- LL = Lucky loser
- Alt = Alternate
- ITF = ITF entry
- PR = Protected ranking
- SR = Special ranking
- SE = Special exempt
- JE = Junior exempt
- JR = Junior Accelerator Programme entrant
- CO = College Accelerator Programme entrant
- NG = Next Gen Accelerator Program entrant
- w/o = Walkover
- r = Retired
- d = Defaulted

First round
1	(Ukraine) L Kichenok (Ukraine) N Kichenok	7	6^{5}	[10]
(Slovakia) J Čepelová (Russia) K Pervak	5	7^{7}	[4]
(Poland) M Linette (Hong Kong) L Zhang	6	6
(China) J Chen (China) A Zhu	4	3
4	(Thailand) N Lertpitaksinchai (Thailand) Pe Plipuech	6	4	[3]
(Ukraine) K Kozlova (Georgia (country)) S Shapatava	0	6	[10]
(Japan) M Eguchi (Japan) E Hozumi	6	6
(Austria) P Mayr-Achleitner (United Kingdom) E Webley-Smith	0	1
(China) Y Wang (China) L Zhu	6	6
(China) Y Li (China) Y Xin	2	2
(China) F Liu (China) Q Zhao	1	3
3	(Chinese Taipei) C-w Chan (Chinese Taipei) C-j Chuang	6	6
(Chinese Taipei) S-y Hsieh (China) Z Yang	4	6	[5]
(Hungary) M Czink (Germany) A-L Friedsam	6	3	[10]
(Turkey) Ç Büyükakçay (Japan) R Ozaki
2	(Croatia) P Martić (Australia) Ar Rodionova	w/o

Quarterfinals
1	(Ukraine) L Kichenok (Ukraine) N Kichenok	6	6^{3}	[7]
(Poland) M Linette (Hong Kong) L Zhang	4	7^{7}	[10]
(Ukraine) K Kozlova (Georgia (country)) S Shapatava	3	2
(Japan) M Eguchi (Japan) E Hozumi	6	6
(China) Y Wang (China) L Zhu	3	4
3	(Chinese Taipei) C-w Chan (Chinese Taipei) C-j Chuang	6	6
(Hungary) M Czink (Germany) A-L Friedsam	4	6	[6]
2	(Croatia) P Martić (Australia) Ar Rodionova	6	3	[10]

Semifinals
(Poland) M Linette (Hong Kong) L Zhang	7^{7}	2	[10]
(Japan) M Eguchi (Japan) E Hozumi	6^{4}	6	[12]
3	(Chinese Taipei) C-w Chan (Chinese Taipei) C-j Chuang	6	6
2	(Croatia) P Martić (Australia) Ar Rodionova	2	1

Final
(Japan) M Eguchi (Japan) E Hozumi	1	6	[7]
3	(Chinese Taipei) C-w Chan (Chinese Taipei) C-j Chuang	6	3	[10]
