= Michaëlla Krajicek =

Dutch tennis player (born 1989)

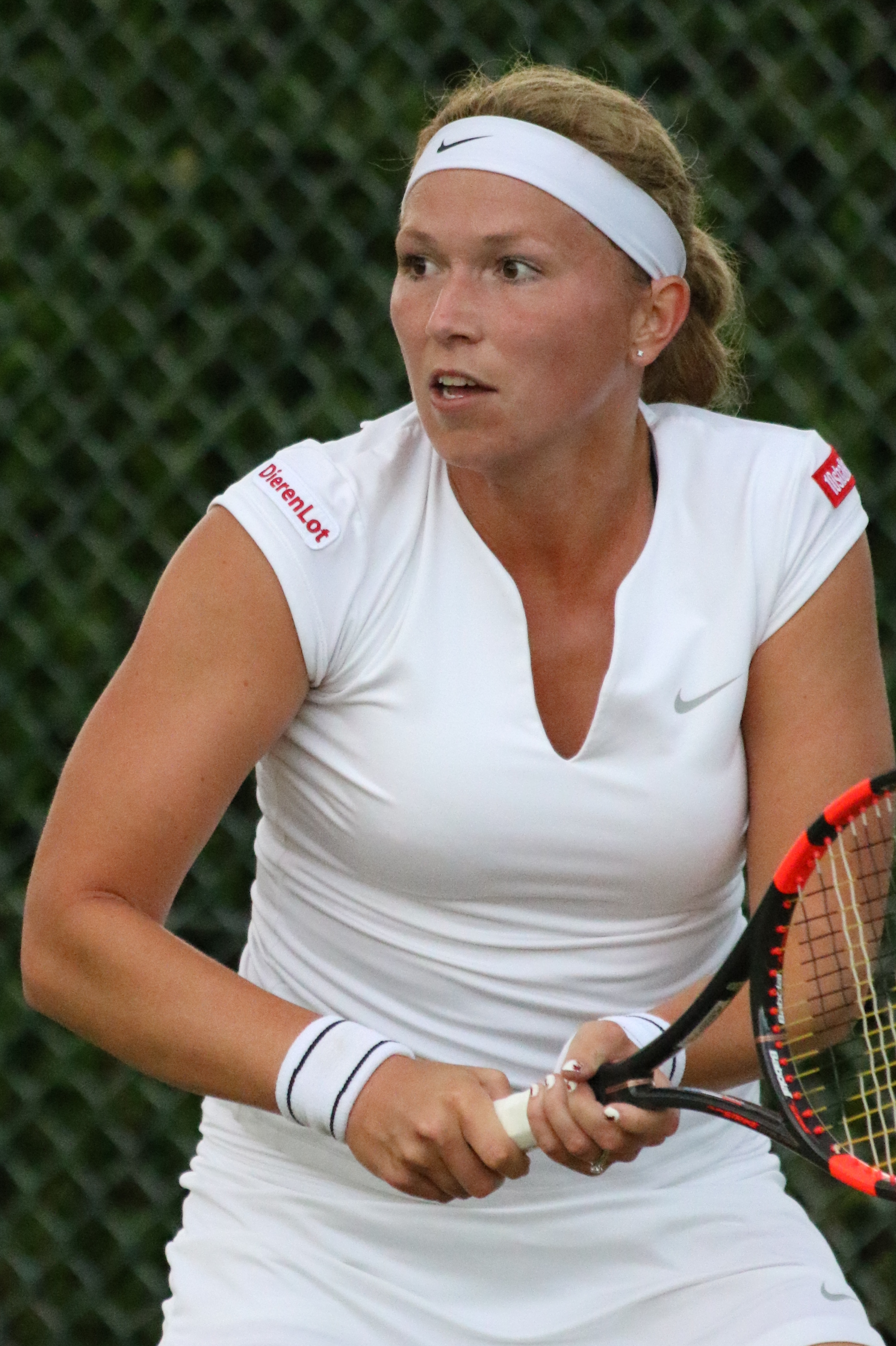
- Krajicek at the 2016 Wimbledon Championships
- Country (sports): Netherlands
- Residence: Prague, Czech Republic; Bradenton, Florida, U.S.
- Born: 9 January 1989 (age 37) Delft, Netherlands
- Height: 1.77 m (5 ft 9 1/2 in)
- Turned pro: 2003
- Retired: 2025
- Plays: Right-handed (two-handed backhand)
- Prize money: US$ 2,084,849

Singles
- Career record: 324–205
- Career titles: 3
- Highest ranking: No. 30 (11 February 2008)

Grand Slam singles results
- Australian Open: 3R (2006)
- French Open: 3R (2007)
- Wimbledon: QF (2007)
- US Open: 2R (2007, 2011)

Doubles
- Career record: 284–162
- Career titles: 5
- Highest ranking: No. 23 (23 March 2015)
- Current ranking: No. 826 (17 February 2025)

Grand Slam doubles results
- Australian Open: SF (2015)
- French Open: SF (2014)
- Wimbledon: 3R (2007)
- US Open: 3R (2014, 2015)

Grand Slam mixed doubles results
- Australian Open: QF (2017)
- French Open: 2R (2015)
- Wimbledon: 2R (2006, 2014, 2015)
- US Open: 2R (2006, 2016)

Team competitions
- Fed Cup: 17–15
- Hopman Cup: F (2006)
- Last updated on: 23 February 2025.

Michaëlla Krajicek (Czech: Michaela Krajíčková; born 9 January 1989) is a Dutch former professional tennis player. She has won three singles and five doubles titles on the WTA Tour, as well as one WTA 125 doubles title, and 14 titles in singles and 24 in doubles on the ITF Women's Circuit. On 11 February 2008, she reached her highest WTA singles ranking of world No. 30. On 23 March 2015, she peaked at No. 23 in the doubles rankings.

== Personal life ==
Michaëlla Krajicek, born in Delft, is the younger half-sister of former world No. 4 and Wimbledon champion Richard Krajicek. She is therefore nicknamed Kleine Kraai, which means "little crow" in Dutch ("kraai" is a Dutch heterograph of the Czech origin surname "Krajicek" and has long been Richard's nickname). Austin Krajicek is her cousin.

An article in a Dutch newspaper with statements from the Fed Cup captain Manon Bollegraf caused Krajicek to stop participating for the Dutch team. Bollegraf commented on Krajicek's relationship with her coach Allistair McCaw. In April 2010, Krajicek confirmed she was in a relationship with McCaw who started as her fitness coach in 2007. In 2011, she returned in the Fed Cup team, after having resolved her differences with Bollegraf.

She lives in Prague, Czech Republic, her parents' native homeland.

In September 2013, she started dating German doubles player Martin Emmrich. They met at the combined ATP/WTA event in Rosmalen that year. One year later in 2014 at the same tournament in Rosmalen, the two got engaged on 16 June, when Emmrich proposed to Krajicek on centre court after her first-round win against Jana Čepelová; they got married in July 2015. However, they separated in mid-2017 and announced their divorce via Twitter in May 2018.

Krajicek has two sons with her partner tennis player Jelle Sels.

== Career ==
=== Juniors (2002–2004) ===
In 2002, the 13-year-old Krajicek was included in the Dutch team for the Cesky Telecom World Junior Tennis final. She was the number-one-ranked junior player in Europe at the time. Krajicek led her country to victory over Poland in the final, winning both her singles and doubles matches en route to a 3–0 win for the Netherlands.

Krajicek won the first Grade-A tournament of 2003 (the Yucatán Cup in Mexico), making it her fourth victory in the seven tournaments she had entered. Her record stood at 33–3. Krajicek won her second Grade-A tournament at the Italian Open taking her to the No. 2 ranking in the world. At the French Open Krajicek lost in the semifinals to Vera Douchevina and reached the final of the doubles with Kateřina Böhmová, losing to Marta Fraga Pérez & Adriana González Peñas in straight sets. Prior to Wimbledon, Krajieck was expected to be one of the main challengers but she lost a three set match 6–8 in the third to Anna Chakvetadze, which ended at 8.50 pm. She got to her second successive Grand Slam junior doubles final with Böhmová, but they lost to scratch pairing Alisa Kleybanova & Sania Mirza in three sets. At the US Open, Krajicek was the favourite, alongside recent Wimbledon winner Kirsten Flipkens. The draw went to form and they met in the final, with Flipkens winning 6–3, 7–5. Krajicek was in tears afterwards and said that she was happy to reach the final but blamed the loss on tiredness and inferior conditioning. In September, Krajicek was named in the Dutch Junior Fed Cup team, a competition the Netherlands had not won since 1990. Despite a persistent nosebleed which threatened her to retire in the semifinals Krajicek was undefeated throughout the tournament as the top-seeded Dutch team won, beating Canada 2–1 in the final. She needed a win in the final event of the year to end 2003 the No. 1 junior in the world but lost in the second round of the Orange Bowl International to Neha Uberoi. She ended the year ranked No. 2 behind Flipkens.

Krajicek had a knee injury at the beginning of 2004 and did not play until late February. At the French Open Krajicek & Böhmová finally won their first Grand Slam Junior Doubles title, beating Irina Kotkina & Yaroslava Shvedova 6–3, 6–2. Krajicek had lost in the quarterfinals of the singles to Timea Bacsinszky 6–8 in the third set. At Wimbledon, Krajicek reached the semifinals of the singles and doubles, losing to eventual champion Kateryna Bondarenko in the singles and alongside new doubles partner Shahar Pe'er falling to Victoria Azarenka & Olga Govortsova. It was at this point that Krajicek started playing ITF tournaments on a regular basis. After winning Satellite tournaments in Brussels in July and Koksijde in August, Krajicek built on these successes by finally winning her maiden singles Junior Grand Slam at the US Open. She beat Jessica Kirkland 6–1, 6–1 to go one step further than the previous year and become the first Dutch winner of the event in ten years (when Sjeng Schalken won the boys' in 1994). In October, Krajicek qualified for her first WTA Tour event in Luxembourg but she lost to No. 8 seed Shinobu Asagoe in the first round proper. She won another ITF tournament in Stockholm, then beat her first top-100 player (Slovak Ľudmila Cervanová) as well as her Wimbledon conqueror Bondarenko en route to the semifinals of the tournament in Poitiers. She followed that up with a win in Bergamo (a tournament) and ended the year ranked No. 429 in the world in the WTA rankings and was the 2004 ITF Junior World Champion, ending the year No. 1 in the world for juniors. She had a 41–6 record in singles and was the first Dutch player to become junior world champion. Her record in seniors was 26–4, winning 26 of her last 28 matches, capturing four ITF titles in the year. Her record on hard courts was 16–2, clay was 10–1, and she lost her only match on grass.

=== 2005 ===
At the age of 16 Krajicek qualified for her first Grand Slam event, the Australian Open. She beat three opponents ranked higher than her to qualify, then beat top-100 player Stéphanie Foretz in straight sets before losing in the second round to No. 12 seed Patty Schnyder. In February she won her first ITF tournament in Urtijëi, beating No. 51 in the world Martina Suchá in the last 16. Three months later, Krajicek reached her first doubles final on the WTA Tour, the Estoril Open partnering Henrieta Nagyová. Now ranked No. 114, she qualified for her second successive Grand Slam (the French Open) without dropping a set but unfortunately drew the No. 20 seed Daniela Hantuchová in the first round and lost to the Slovak 3–6, 1–6. A consolation was that her performance in qualifying had made her a top-100 player for the first time, ranked No. 99. After the French Open, Krajicek received three wild cards into Wimbledon. She intended to play in both the women's doubles and mixed doubles (together with her brother Richard). However, she was injured during the Rosmalen Open just a week before the start of Wimbledon, and had to withdraw.

Krajicek returned to play in October by qualifying for the Tier II event in Luxembourg, but a week later, Krajicek won her first WTA event by winning the Tashkent Open. She beat Akgul Amanmuradova in the final. It was the first WTA tournament win for a Dutch female in eight years, after Brenda Schultz-McCarthy won the Bell Challenge in Quebec. Three weeks after that in Hasselt, she beat Anna Chakvetadze, Lucie Šafářová and the No. 13 in the world Nathalie Dechy on her way to the semifinals where she lost to Francesca Schiavone.

She ended the year ranked No. 58 in the world with a 30–10 playing record. She went 17–5 on hardcourts, 6–4 on clay, 2–1 on grass and 5–0 on carpet.

=== 2006 ===
She started the year by qualifying for the Hopman Cup tournament in Perth with Peter Wessels where the duo went all the way to the final to be beaten in a very close mixed doubles by the American team of Taylor Dent and Lisa Raymond. She won three out of her five singles matches (def. Lisa Raymond, Gisela Dulko and Anna-Lena Grönefeld; lost to Samantha Stosur and Peng Shuai). In mixed doubles, they had a 3–2 record (def. Reid/Stosur, Peng/Sun, Grönefeld/Kiefer; lost to Raymond/Dent, Dulko/Gaudio).

A week later, Krajicek won her second WTA title in Hobart only dropping one set en route to the final, where she beat her practice partner Iveta Benešová 6–2, 6–1. This win put her inside the top 50 to a career-high ranking of No. 43 entering the Australian Open. At the Australian Open Krajicek reached the third round for the first time ever in a Grand Slam tournament. In the first round she beat Kristina Brandi and in the second she defeated 32nd seed Sania Mirza of India. However, she retired from her third-round match against Amélie Mauresmo, after suffering from heat exhaustion. The clay-court season was not a successful one, despite a semifinal appearance at the İstanbul Cup where she lost to Anastasia Myskina in straight sets. This was the only real highlight on clay for Krajicek in 2006 as she lost in the first round of the French Open in straight sets to No. 7 seed Patty Schnyder. This led her to drop out of the top 50, but that was only briefly as in the warm up for Wimbledon she won her third career title (and second of the year) in 's-Hertogenbosch (her brother Richard was one of the tournament organisers). In the semifinal she beat a top-10 player for the first time in what she described as the best match of her career, overcoming top seed (and No. 8 in the world) Elena Dementieva in three sets. She beat Dinara Safina in the final, but could not continue her form into Wimbledon though, losing in the first round to Australian doubles expert Sam Stosur.

Post-Wimbledon Krajicek won two successive Tier IV doubles tournaments on clay with Janette Husárová in Palermo and Budapest, the latter where she also got to the semifinals in singles competition. Thereafter the hardcourt season was not a productive one for Krajicek, losing in the first round of four successive tournaments, including the US Open where she lost 3–6, 0–6 to the eventual winner Maria Sharapova.

Krajicek ended the year ranked No. 35 in the world, she had a 27–18 record, 14–9 on hardcourts, 8–7 on clay, 5–1 on grass and 0–1 on carpet. She was 1–5 against top-10 opponents.

=== 2007 ===
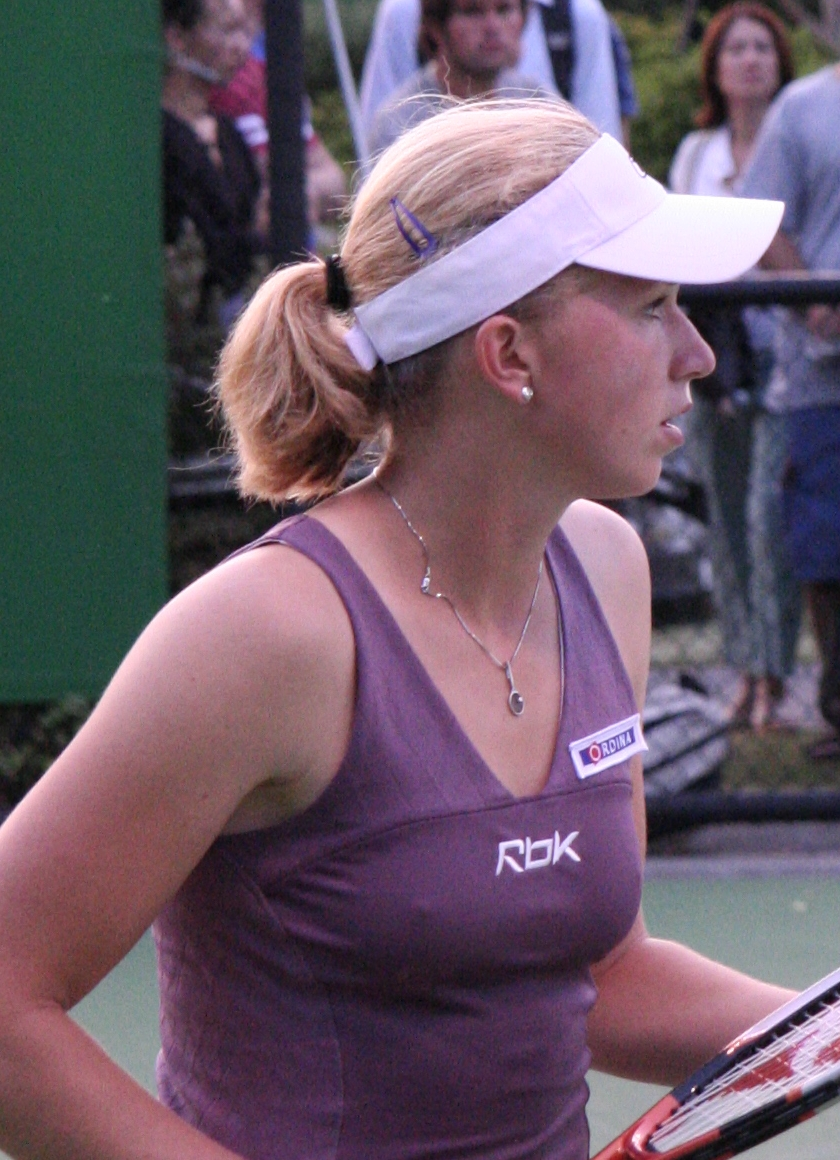
Krajicek at the 2007 Australian Open

Krajicek's 2007 season did not start as strongly as her 2006 one did as she lost 6–3, 1–6, 0–6 to Séverine Brémond in the first round of the Hobart International, where she was the defending champion. She was then defeated in straight sets by Luxembourg's Anne Kremer in the first round at the Australian Open. The inability to defend the previous year's points dropped her ranking dramatically as she entered Paris ranked No. 70 in the world. After being dumped out of the first round in Paris in straight sets by Dinara Safina, Krajicek proceeded to lose in the second round of four successive tournaments. Her best result on clay prior to the French Open was a quarterfinal run in a Tier I tournament in Charleston. Krajicek beat both top seed Nicole Vaidišová and Sybille Bammer in three sets, before losing to Vera Zvonareva.

At the French Open she made the third round, beating local favorite and 31st seed Séverine Brémond followed by Shenay Perry before losing to No. 8 seed Serena Williams. As the No. 31 seed at Wimbledon (but ranked outside the top 40 for not defending points in 's-Hertogenbosch), her skills on the grass shone through as she defeated Tzipora Obziler, British wildcard Katie O'Brien, world No. 7 Anna Chakvetadze and Laura Granville en route to her very first quarterfinal showing at a Grand Slam. In her quarterfinal match, she was defeated by 18th seed and eventual finalist, Marion Bartoli, in a rain-affected three-set match.

Following Wimbledon, though top-seeded she lost in the first round of Palermo, losing 2–6, 4–6 to 111th ranked Eva Birnerová in her final tournament prior to the American hardcourt season. Krajicek lost in the second round in San Diego to former No. 1, Martina Hingis, the third round in L.A. to Maria Sharapova (a match where the wind conditions were so poor one end was virtually unplayable) and the first round in Toronto to Shahar Pe'er. At the US Open, Krajicek fell in the second round to Ágnes Szávay in two sets.

On the European indoor-circuit Krajicek fared a little better, going out in the first round in three of her final five tournaments and only winning one match in Moscow. Her only good run came in Stuttgart where, due to the heavily packed field, she had to qualify and won four matches in a row before succumbing to Nadia Petrova 1–6, 3–6 in the last 16.

Her record in 2007 was 24–26 (her first season on tour with a losing record), with 11–12 on hardcourts, 7–8 on clay, 5–3 on grass and 1–3 on carpet. Her record against top-10 players was 2–5. She finished 34th in the Race to the WTA Championships.

=== 2008 ===
Krajicek struggled early in 2008. After bombing out in the first round at the Auckland Open, she lost to Akiko Morigami during the first round of the Australian Open. Following a break of over a month, she lost her first match at the Indian Wells Open to the Russian Galina Voskoboeva. Then at the Miami Open, she lost first up Marina Erakovic in three sets, and then to Alizé Cornet at the Family Circle Cup. Returning to Europe, she lost four straight tournaments without winning a set. These were to Akgul Amanmuradova at the ECM Prague Open, Sybille Bammer at the German Open, Sam Stosur at the Internazionali BNL d'Italia and then Sanda Mamić at the French Open.

Her form turned around at Birmingham where she defeated Tatiana Poutchek 6–2, 6–1 for her first win of the year. However, she lost to eventual finalist Yanina Wickmayer. At her home tournament in 's-Hertogenbosch, she defeated Japanese veteran Ai Sugiyama in a tough battle. In the second round she then defeated Sania Mirza, 6–2, 6–2. However, she lost the quarterfinal match against Tamarine Tanasugarn.

At the end of the year her singles ranking was 219. Her record for the year was 8–16.

=== 2009 ===
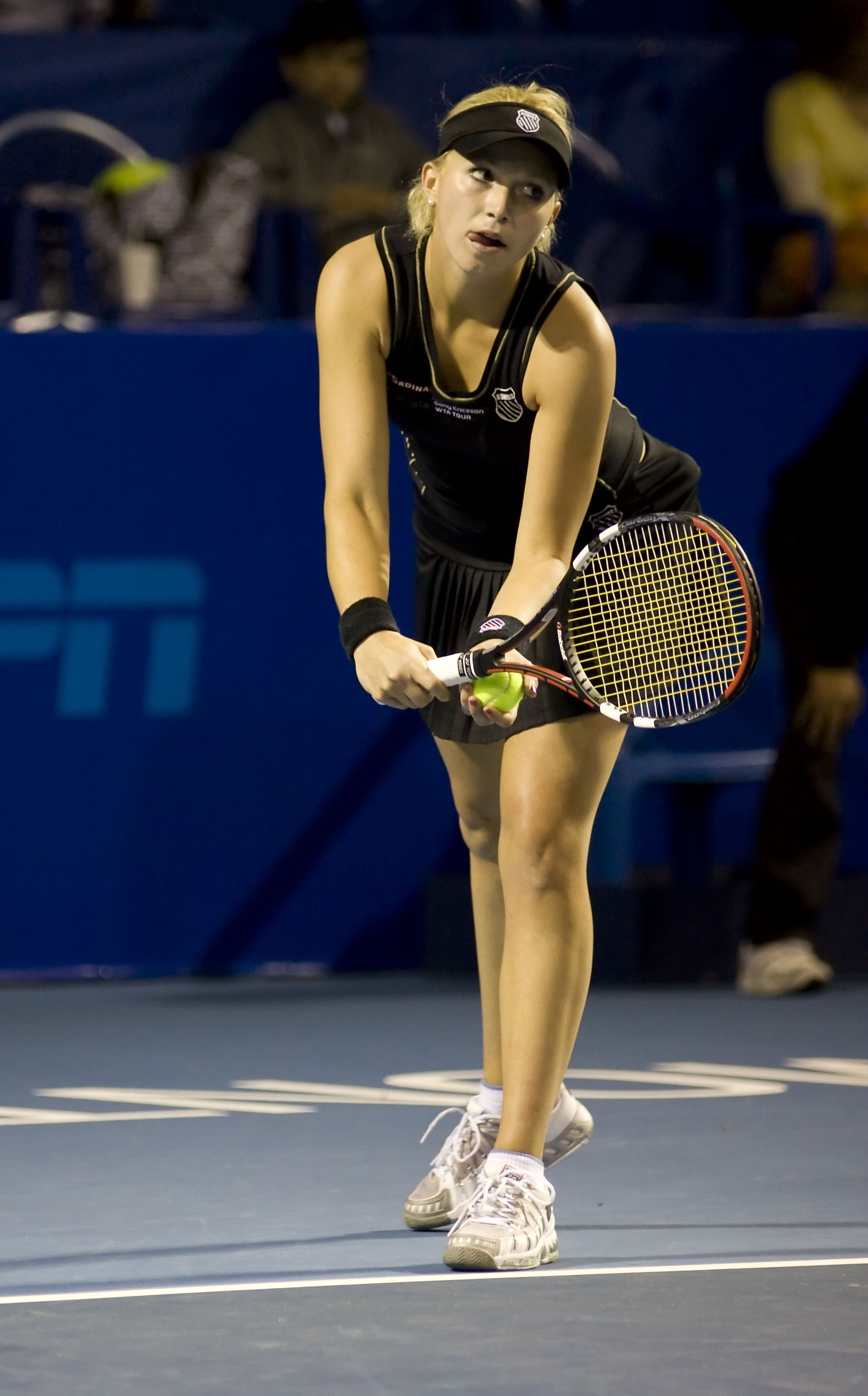
Krajicek at the 2009 Monterrey Open

Krajicek mainly played ITF tournaments early in the year, with limited success. In particular, she missed the Australian Open for the first time since 2004. However, she did play some WTA tournaments, notably the Cellular South Cup where after qualifying, she made it to the quarterfinals, losing to top seed Caroline Wozniacki. Furthermore, Krajicek made the doubles final of that tournament, playing with Yuliana Fedak, eventually losing to Wozniacki and Victoria Azarenka.

In June, she won an ITF event in Boston, defeating Rebecca Marino in the final. Throughout the year, Krajicek never failed to make at least the semifinals in any doubles tournament that she competed in. She won two, the first in Torhout with Yanina Wickmayer in April, and then in November with Sofia Arvidsson in Bratislava.

The only major tournament that Krajicek entered qualifying for in 2009 was the French Open, losing her first match to Simona Halep.

At the end of the year her ranking in singles was 129. Her record for the year was 4–7.

=== 2010 ===
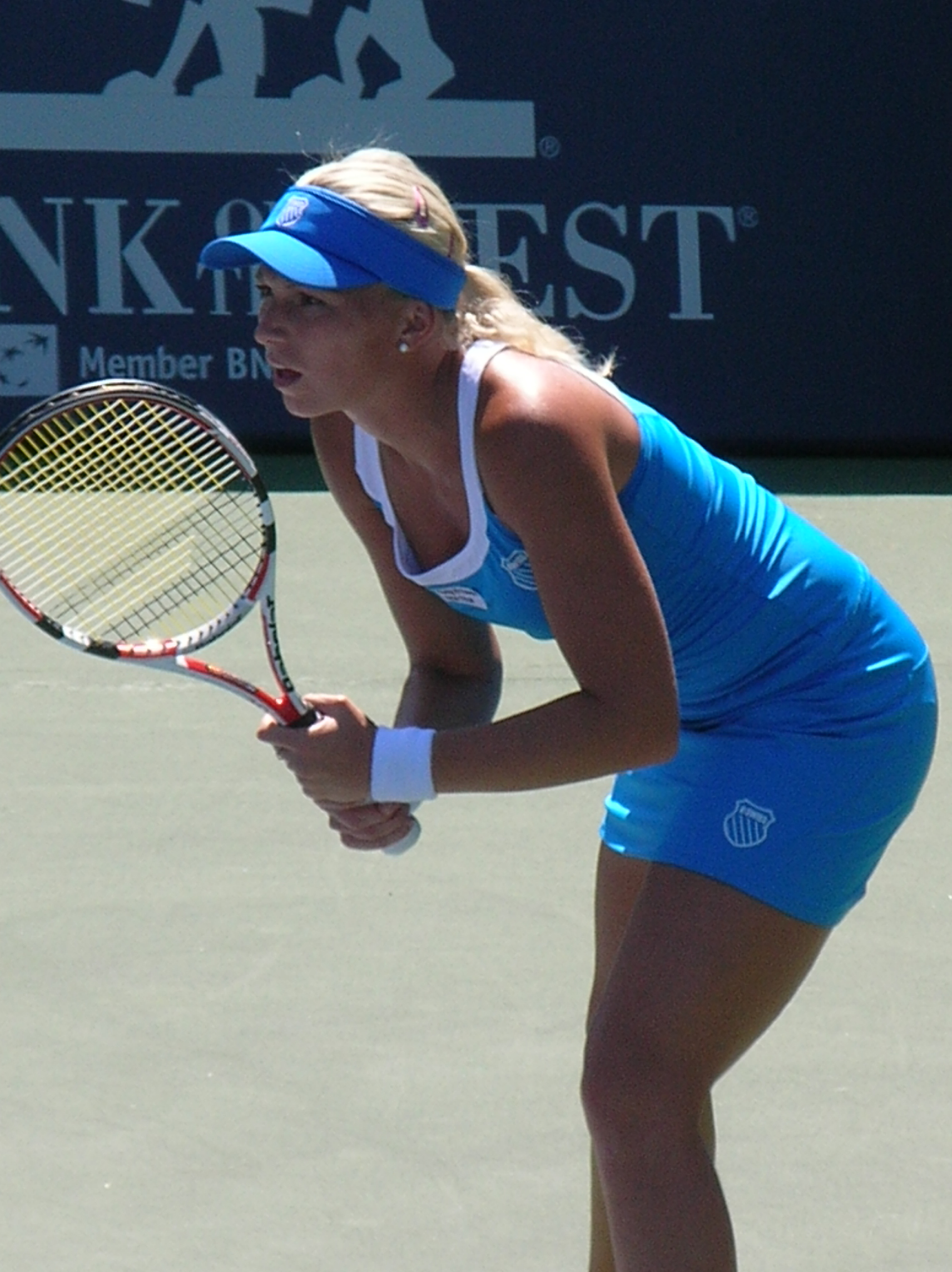
Krajicek at the 2010 Stanford Classic

Preparing for the Australian Open, she participated in Brisbane and Hobart both losing in the qualifications. Because of her ranking Krajicek had to play the qualifications for the Australian Grand Slam, falling in the third round to Angelique Kerber in three sets. She also competed in the doubles main event with Dominika Cibulková, but lost in the first round.

Her next tournament was the Cellular South Cup in Memphis. She lost in the second round to Petra Kvitová. She won the doubles titles with her partner Vania King.

She played in the qualification rounds for Monterrey, Indian Wells, Miami and Ponte Vedra Beach. Only reaching the main event in Miama, losing in the first round to Melanie Oudin. Later in Charleston, she reached the second round.

Before going to Europe for the two Grand Slams, she competed on the ITF Circuit in the U.S. Reaching the second round in Dothan, winning Charlottesville and falling in the quarterfinals in Indian Harbour Beach. Charlottesville would be the only singles title Krajicek would win in 2010.

Her season end ranking in singles was 141.

=== 2011 ===
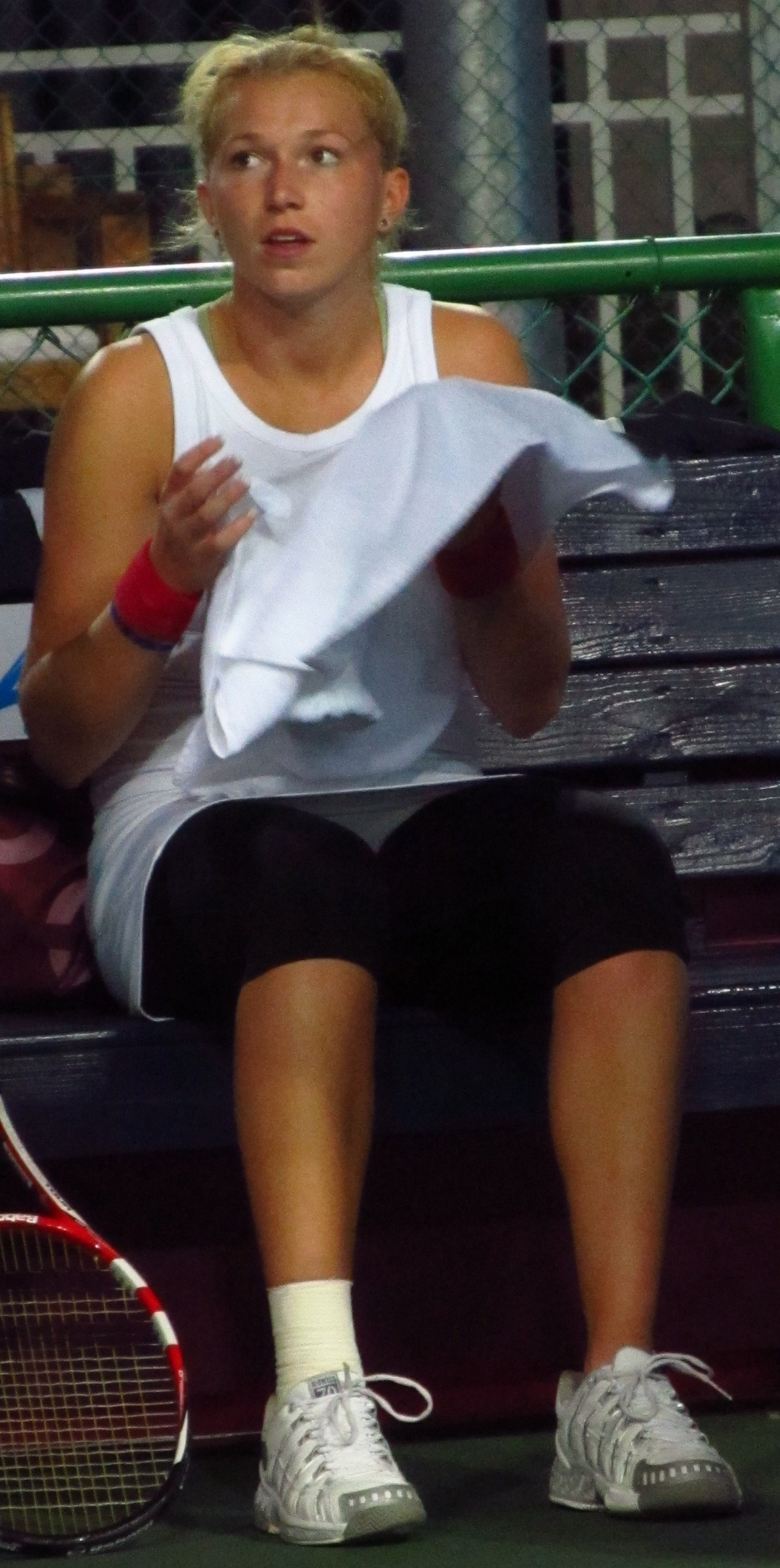
Krajicek at the 2011 Fed Cup

In the Australian Open she participated in the qualification tournament, losing in the first round to the No. 156 player Sabine Lisicki. In the doubles, she reached the second round with partner Petra Kvitová.

For the first time since 2007, Krajicek competed for the Netherlands in the Fed Cup. Playing in Group I of the European/African zone against Hungary, Romania and Latvia, she won all her singles matches. Winning most notably from Monica Niculescu, ranked 68 on the WTA Tour. After being undefeated in the group round the Netherlands faced Switzerland in the semifinal. Krajicek lost both her single and double match, partnered with Arantxa Rus, thus eliminating the Netherlands from the competition.

Like previous years she competed at the Cellular South Cup winning the first round from Barbora Záhlavová-Strýcová with 6–1, 6–3. Later losing in the second round to Alexa Glatch in a three-setter. In the doubles, she reached the semifinals with partner Vania King.

At the Malaysian Open in Kuala Lumpur, she won the first round from her doubles partner Tatjana Malek, and then in the second round from 2010 winner and No. 3 seed Alisa Kleybanova. She won in the quarterfinals from Luxembourg player Anne Kremer but lost in the semifinals from later winner Jelena Dokić with 2–6, 3–6. In the doubles, she lost in the first round.

At the US Open, Krajicek came through to qualifying to reach her first Grand Slam main draw since Wimbledon 2008, facing Eleni Daniilidou in the first round. She won in three sets to progress to the second round, where she faced title favourite Serena Williams to whom she lost easily, 0–6, 1–6.

She then played at the Bell Challenge in Québec City. She defeated wildcard Marie-Ève Pelletier in the first round and French qualifier Julie Coin in the second. Krajicek faced No. 4 seed Rebecca Marino in the quarterfinals, defeating her 6–1, 6–3. Thus reaching her second semifinal of the year. In the semifinals, she lost to No. 6 seed and eventual champion, Záhlavová-Strýcová. In doubles, she reached the quarterfinals with partner Lucie Šafářová.

After Quebec City, Krajicek played ITF tournaments in Joué-lès-Tours, Limoges, Barnstaple and Toyota. She reached the semifinals, quarterfinals, quarterfinals and semifinals, respectively. She withdrew from the Toyota single semifinals and double finals because of a knee injury. Due to her achievements at the end of the season she reentered the top 100, entering at No. 95. She ended the season at No. 93.

=== 2012 ===
Krajicek entered qualifications for the Brisbane International. She faced Kristina Mladenovic in the first round of the qualifying tournament. Mladenovic hit 20 aces during the match. Krajicek hit 12 aces and saved zhtrr match-points in the second set and lost eventually in three sets. She played doubles with Vania King and held a match-point in the super-tiebreak before falling to second seeded duo Iveta Benešová and Barbora Záhlavová-Strýcová. The following week she played at the Sydney International where she beat Brit Anne Keothavong in the first qualifying round. In the second round, she lost to Stefanie Vögele. In doubles, she played the main draw with her partner Alexandra Dulgheru. They faced wildcards Sofia Arvidsson and Jelena Dokić in the first round and lost in two sets.

At the Australian Open, Krajicek gained direct entry into the main draw for the first time since 2008. She played Kristina Barrois in the first round and came through with a two-sets victory after saving five setpoints in the tiebreak. She was set to play her second-round match against former world No. 1, Ana Ivanovic. However, she was suffering from nerves as the match was played on the Hisense Arena and Krajicek lost in straight sets.

In the last week of January, Krajicek played the Fed Cup together with fellow Dutch players Arantxa Rus, Kiki Bertens and Bibiane Schoofs. She failed to convert a matchpoint against Shahar Pe'er and lost in three sets. Also Elena Baltacha and Michelle Larcher de Brito proved too strong, defeating Krajicek in two sets. In February and March, Krajicek made a trip along tournaments in North America. At her usual stop at the indoor WTA tournament of Memphis, she defeated Elena Baltacha, firing 15 aces. She then played Belarusian Olga Govortsova in the second round and won after being down 1–4 in the first set. She fired an additional ten aces in this match. In the quarterfinals, she fell just short of Marina Erakovic in a narrow match. At the WTA tournament of Acapulco, played on clay. She managed to beat Alexandra Cadanțu and Alberta Brianti, both in three sets. She lost to top seed Roberta Vinci in the quarterfinals. This was the first time since 1996 that a Dutch woman reached back to back quarterfinals in WTA tournaments. In 1996, Brenda Schultz-McCarthy reached the quarterfinals for four consecutive weeks.

She qualified for the Premier Mandatory event in Indian Wells, beating veteran Yvonne Meusburger and Mandy Minella from Luxembourg. She also pulled off a main-draw win against Urszula Radwańska, coming back from being down 2–4 in the third set and eventually winning before she lost easily to 31st seed Zheng Jie in two sets. After the tournament it was announced that Krajicek had ended her collaboration with her coach Eric van Harpen.

Krajicek played Miami in the second half of March and got direct entry into the main draw. She defeated Eva Birnerová in three sets before losing a competitive match to world No. 1, Victoria Azarenka. In Budapest, she lost in the first round against qualifier Akgul Amanmuradova, after having several match points. In the doubles, she reached the finals with partner Eva Birnerová.

After the tournament in Budapest, Krajicek underwent surgery for her right knee. In spite of this she still managed to play Roland Garros. Krajicek lost in the first round to Petra Martić. Her next tournament was Birmingham, she played Czech Andrea Hlaváčková but had to retire at 0–4 in the third set due to viral illness. She then was out for multiple weeks with this illness. She returned at the US Open losing both her singles and doubles match in the first round. Krajicek took time off after the tournament to work on her health problems.

=== 2013 ===
After seven months of not playing any tournaments because of problems with her heart and fatigue Krajicek returned in a $10k tournament in Heraklion, Greece. Ranked 922 at the time she won the singles and doubles title, partnering with Indy de Vroome. She also faced de Vroome in the singles final winning in three sets. Because she had her ranking 'frozen' after the US Open she can use her protected ranking of 105 to enter higher level tournaments.

After Heraklion she played in the Dutch competition for match practice. She played for ALTA Amersfoort. Her first WTA tournament in 2013 was 's Hertogenbosch. In the first round she defeated Sílvia Soler Espinosa. This was her first win against a top-100 player since March 2012. She lost to Kirsten Flipkens in the second round with 6–7, 6–7, after being ahead in each set. The two sets took over two hours.

In her first appearance in a Wimbledon main draw since 2008, she lost to Li Na in two sets.

After Wimbledon, she reached the quarterfinals in the Beijing $75k tournament and won the doubles title at the WTA International in Suzhou, partnering with Tímea Babos.

In September, she reconnected with her former coach Eric van Harpen to work on her technique.

=== 2015 ===
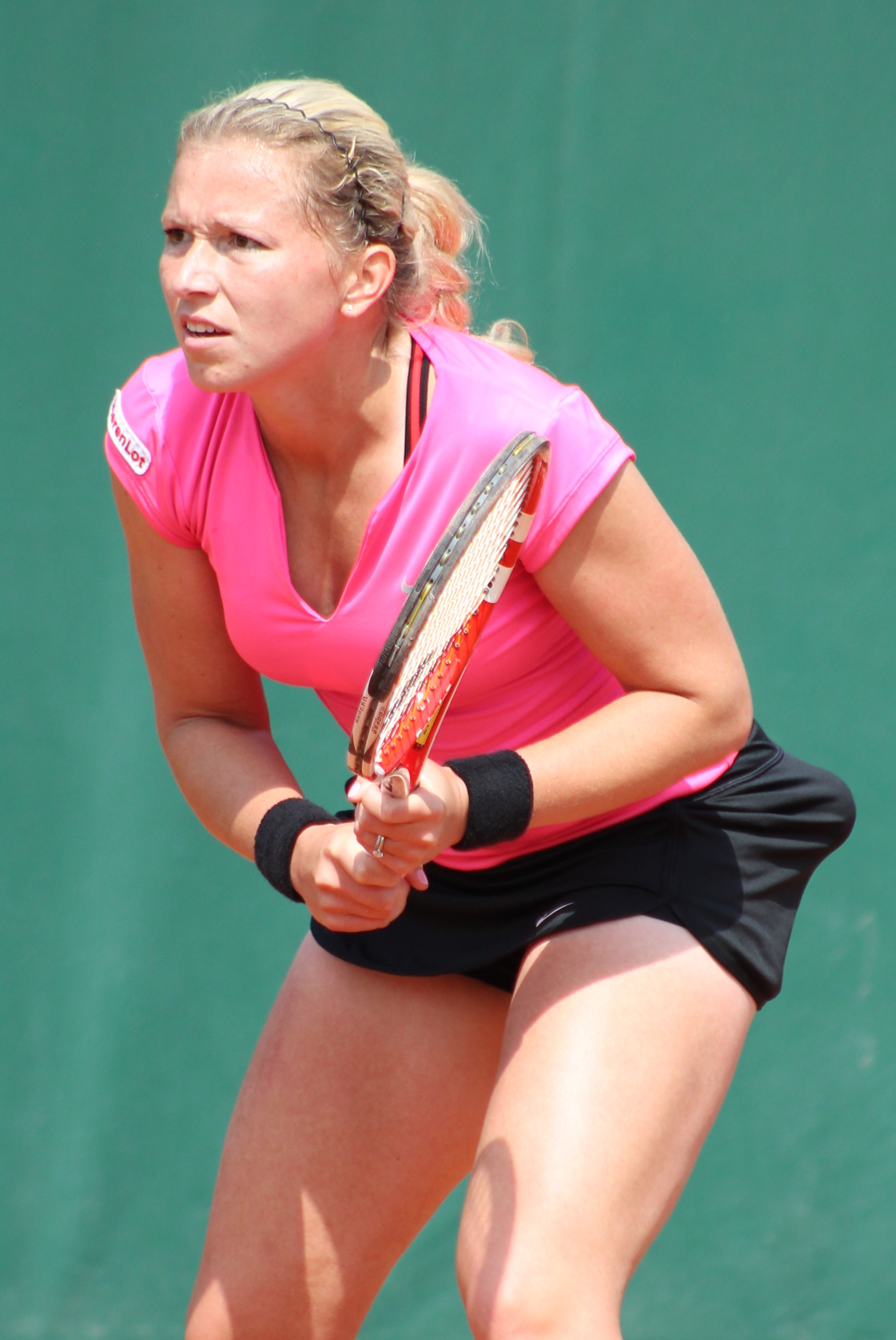
Krajicek at the 2015 French Open

At the Rosmalen Championships, Krajicek served a tournament record 21 aces in her second-round loss to Camila Giorgi, beating the 19 served by CoCo Vandeweghe against Marina Erakovic the previous year. That tied her for eight on the all-time list of aces in a match at a WTA tournament. Giorgi served nine aces herself during the match.

=== 2024: Comeback ===
Krajicek received a main-draw wildcard for the W15 tournament in Sharm El Sheikh, marking her return to professional tour for the first time since 2019.

=== 2025: Retirement ===
Krajicek retired from tennis and a ceremony celebrating her career was held in 's-Hertogenbosch.

== Grand Slam performance timelines ==
Key
W	F	SF	QF	#R	RR	Q#	DNQ	A	NH

(W) winner; (F) finalist; (SF) semifinalist; (QF) quarterfinalist; (#R) rounds 4, 3, 2, 1; (RR) round-robin stage; (Q#) qualification round; (DNQ) did not qualify; (A) absent; (NH) not held; (SR) strike rate (events won / competed); (W–L) win–loss record.
To avoid confusion and double counting, these charts are updated at the conclusion of a tournament or when the player's participation has ended.

=== Singles ===
Tournament	2005	2006	2007	2008	2009	2010	2011	2012	2013	2014	2015	2016	2017	W–L
Australian Open	2R	3R	1R	1R	A	Q3	Q1	2R	A	A	A	A	Q2	4–5
French Open	1R	1R	3R	1R	Q1	Q3	Q2	1R	A	A	A	Q1	A	2–5
Wimbledon	A	1R	QF	1R	A	Q3	Q1	A	1R	A	A	Q1	A	4–4
US Open	A	1R	2R	A	A	Q1	2R	1R	A	Q2	A	Q1	A	2–4
Win–loss	1–2	2–4	7–4	0–3	0–0	0–0	1–1	1–3	0–1	0–0	0–0	0–0	0–0	12–18

=== Doubles ===
Tournament	2006	2007	2008	2009	2010	2011	2012	2013	2014	2015	2016	2017	2018	W–L
Australian Open	3R	2R	1R	A	1R	2R	1R	A	3R	SF	A	2R	2R	12–10
French Open	1R	3R	1R	A	2R	3R	A	A	SF	QF	2R	A	A	13–8
Wimbledon	2R	3R	1R	A	1R	1R	A	A	2R	3R	3R	A	A	8–8
US Open	2R	2R	A	A	1R	1R	1R	A	3R	3R	2R	A	1R	7–9
Win–loss	4–4	6–4	0–3	0–0	1–4	3–4	0–2	0–0	9–4	11–4	4–3	1–1	1–2	40–35

== WTA Tour finals ==
=== Singles: 3 (3 titles) ===
Legend Grand Slam Tier I Tier II Tier III, IV & V (3–0)	Finals by surface Hard (2–0) Grass (1–0) Clay (0–0) Carpet (0–0)

Result	W–L	Date	Tournament	Tier	Surface	Opponent	Score
Win	1–0	Oct 2005	Tashkent Open, Uzbekistan	Tier IV	Hard	(Uzbekistan) Akgul Amanmuradova	6–0, 4–6, 6–3
Win	2–0	Jan 2006	Hobart International, Australia	Tier IV	Hard	(Czech Republic) Iveta Benešová	6–2, 6–1
Win	3–0	Jun 2006	Rosmalen Open, Netherlands	Tier III	Grass	(Russia) Dinara Safina	6–3, 6–4

=== Doubles: 16 (5 titles, 11 runner–ups) ===
Legend (pre/post 2010) Grand Slam tournaments Tier I / Premier M & Premier 5 Tier II / Premier (0–2) Tier III, IV & V / International (5–9)	Finals by surface Hard (1–4) Clay (3–5) Grass (1–2) Carpet (0–0)

Result	W–L	Date	Tournament	Tier	Surface	Partner	Opponents	Score
Loss	0–1	Apr 2005	Portugal Open	Tier IV	Clay	(Slovakia) Henrieta Nagyová	(China) Li Ting (China) Sun Tiantian	3–6, 1–6
Loss	0–2	Oct 2005	Gaz de France Stars, Belgium	Tier III	Hard(i)	(Hungary) Ágnes Szávay	(France) Émilie Loit (Slovenia) Katarina Srebotnik	3–6, 4–6
Loss	0–3	Feb 2006	Diamond Games, Belgium	Tier II	Hard (i)	(France) Stéphanie Foretz	(Russia) Dinara Safina (Slovenia) Katarina Srebotnik	1–6, 1–6
Win	1–3	Jul 2006	Palermo Ladies Open, Italia	Tier IV	Clay	(Slovakia) Janette Husárová	(Italy) Alice Canepa (Italy) Giulia Gabba	6–0, 6–0
Win	2–3	Jul 2006	Budapest Grand Prix, Hungary	Tier IV	Clay	(Slovakia) Janette Husárová	(Czech Republic) Lucie Hradecká (Czech Republic) Renata Voráčová	4–6, 6–4, 6–4
Loss	2–4	May 2008	Prague Open, Czech Republic	Tier IV	Clay	(United States) Jill Craybas	(Czech Republic) Andrea Hlaváčková (Czech Republic) Lucie Hradecká	6–1, 3–6, [6–10]
Win	3–4	Jul 2008	Rosmalen Open, Netherlands	Tier III	Grass	(New Zealand) Marina Erakovic	(Latvia) Līga Dekmeijere (Germany) Angelique Kerber	6–3, 6–2
Loss	3–5	Feb 2009	U.S. National Indoor Championships	International	Hard (i)	(Ukraine) Yuliana Fedak	(Belarus) Victoria Azarenka (Denmark) Caroline Wozniacki	1–6, 6–7^{(2)}
Loss	3–6	Jun 2009	Rosmalen Open, Netherlands	International	Grass	(Belgium) Yanina Wickmayer	(Italy) Sara Errani (Italy) Flavia Pennetta	4–6, 7–5, [11–13]
Win	4–6	Feb 2010	U.S. National Indoor Championships	International	Hard (i)	(United States) Vania King	(United States) Bethanie Mattek-Sands (United States) Meghann Shaughnessy	7–5, 6–2
Loss	4–7	Apr 2010	Charleston Open, United States	Premier	Clay	(United States) Vania King	(United States) Liezel Huber (Russia) Nadia Petrova	3–6, 4–6
Loss	4–8	Apr 2011	Portugal Open	International	Clay	(Greece) Eleni Daniilidou	(Russia) Alisa Kleybanova (Kazakhstan) Galina Voskoboeva	4–6, 2–6
Loss	4–9	May 2012	Budapest Grand Prix, Hungary	International	Clay	(Czech Republic) Eva Birnerová	(Slovakia) Janette Husárová (Slovakia) Magdaléna Rybáriková	4–6, 2–6
Loss	4–10	Jan 2014	Auckland Open, New Zealand	International	Hard	(Czech Republic) Lucie Hradecká	(Canada) Sharon Fichman (United States) Maria Sanchez	6–2, 0–6, [4–10]
Win	5–10	May 2014	Nuremberg Cup, Germany	International	Clay	(Czech Republic) Karolína Plíšková	(Romania) Raluca Olaru (Israel) Shahar Pe'er	6–0, 4–6, [10–6]
Loss	5–11	Jun 2014	Rosmalen Open, Netherlands	International	Grass	(France) Kristina Mladenovic	(New Zealand) Marina Erakovic (Spain) Arantxa Parra Santonja	6–0, 6–7^{(5)}, [8–10]

== WTA Challenger finals ==
=== Doubles: 1 (title) ===
Result	W–L	Date	Tournament	Surface	Partner	Opponents	Score
Win	1–0	Aug 2013	Suzhou Ladies Open, China	Hard	(Hungary) Tímea Babos	(China) Han Xinyun (Japan) Eri Hozumi	6–2, 6–2

== ITF Circuit finals ==
=== Singles: 16 (14–2) ===
Legend $100,000 tournaments $75,000 tournaments $50,000 tournaments $25,000 tournaments $10/15,000 tournaments	Finals by surface Hard (6–1) Clay (3–0) Carpet (5–1)

Result	W–L	Date	Tournament	Tier	Surface	Opponent	Score
Win	1–0	Jul 2004	ITF Brussels, Belgium	10,000	Clay	(Italy) Elisa Villa	6–3, 6–0
Win	2–0	Aug 2004	ITF Koksijde, Belgium	10,000	Clay	(Switzerland) Gaëlle Widmer	6–4, 6–2
Win	3–0	Nov 2004	ITF Stockholm, Sweden	10,000	Hard (i)	(Russia) Anastasia Revzina	6–1, 6–2
Win	4–0	Dec 2004	ITF Bergamo, Italy	50,000	Carpet (i)	(Russia) Ekaterina Bychkova	6–4, 6–3
Win	5–0	Feb 2005	ITF Ortisei, Italy	75,000	Carpet (i)	(Germany) Sandra Klösel	6–3, 6–3
Loss	5–1	Nov 2008	Bratislava Open, Slovakia	100,000	Hard (i)	(Russia) Anastasia Pavlyuchenkova	3–6, 1–6
Win	6–1	Jul 2009	ITF Boston, United States	50,000	Hard	(Canada) Rebecca Marino	6–3, 6–4
Win	7–1	May 2010	Charlottesville Open, United States	50,000	Clay	(Germany) Laura Siegemund	6–2, 6–4
Win	8–1	Apr 2013	ITF Heraklion, Greece	10,000	Carpet	(Netherlands) Indy de Vroome	3–6, 6–2, 6–4
Win	9–1	Feb 2014	ITF Kreuzlingen, Switzerland	25,000	Carpet (i)	(Switzerland) Timea Bacsinszky	6–4, 7–6^{(5)}
Win	10–1	Apr 2014	ITF Dijon, France	15,000	Hard (i)	(Russia) Olga Doroshina	3–6, 7–5, 6–2
Win	11–1	Sep 2015	ITF Albuquerque, United States	75,000	Hard	(United Kingdom) Naomi Broady	6–7^{(2)}, 7–6^{(3)}, 7–5
Win	12–1	Oct 2015	Las Vegas Open, United States	50,000	Hard	(United States) Shelby Rogers	6–3, 6–1
Loss	12–2	Jul 2016	ITF Imola, Italy	25,000	Carpet	(Russia) Veronika Kudermetova	4–6, 2–6
Win	13–2	Jul 2016	Lexington Challenger, United States	50,000	Hard	(Australia) Arina Rodionova	6–0, 2–6, 6–2
Win	14–2	Feb 2018	ITF Solarino, Italy	15,000	Carpet	(Czech Republic) Monika Kilnarová	6–3, 6–2

=== Doubles: 33 (24–9) ===
Legend $100,000 tournaments $75/80,000 tournaments $50,000 tournaments $25,000 tournaments $10/15,000 tournaments	Finals by surface Hard (15–7) Clay (6–1) Carpet (3–1)

Outcome	No.	Date	Tournament	Surface	Partner	Opponents	Score
Winner	1.	1 November 2004	ITF Stockholm, Sweden	Hard (i)	(Netherlands) Jolanda Mens	(Russia) Sofia Avakova (Latvia) Irina Kuzmina	6–2, 6–3
Winner	2.	5 April 2005	ITF Dinan, France	Clay	(Hungary) Ágnes Szávay	(Ukraine) Yuliya Beygelzimer (Germany) Sandra Klösel	7–5, 7–5
Winner	3.	10 April 2009	Torhout Open, Belgium	Hard (i)	(Belgium) Yanina Wickmayer	(Germany) Julia Görges (Austria) Sandra Klemenschits	6–4, 6–0
Runner-up	1.	26 October 2009	Internationaux de Poitiers, France	Hard (i)	(Poland) Marta Domachowska	(France) Julie Coin (Canada) Marie-Ève Pelletier	3–6, 6–3, [3–10]
Winner	4.	11 November 2009	Bratislava Open, Slovakia	Hard (i)	(Sweden) Sofia Arvidsson	(Belarus) Tatiana Poutchek (Australia) Arina Rodionova	6–3, 6–4
Runner-up	2.	17 October 2010	Torhout Open, Belgium	Hard	(Belgium) Yanina Wickmayer	(Switzerland) Timea Bacsinszky (Italy) Tathiana Garbin	4–6, 2–6
Winner	5.	10 November 2010	GB Pro-Series Barnstaple, UK	Hard (i)	(Czech Republic) Andrea Hlaváčková	(Austria) Sandra Klemenschits (Germany) Tatjana Malek	7–6, 6–2
Winner	6.	14 May 2011	Sparta Prague Open, Czech Republic	Clay	(Czech Republic) Petra Cetkovská	(United States) Lindsay Lee-Waters (United States) Megan Moulton-Levy	6–2, 6–1
Winner	7.	31 July 2011	ITS Cup, Czech Republic	Clay	(Czech Republic) Renata Voráčová	(Ukraine) Yuliya Beygelzimer (Romania) Elena Bogdan	7–6, 6–3
Runner-up	3.	26 November 2011	Toyota World Challenge, Japan	Carpet (i)	(France) Caroline Garcia	(Japan) Makoto Ninomiya (Japan) Riko Sawayanagi	w/o
Winner	8.	19 April 2013	ITF Heraklion, Greece	Carpet	(Netherlands) Indy de Vroome	(Netherlands) Rosalie van der Hoek (Japan) Yuka Mori	6–0, 5–7, [10–8]
Winner	9.	27 September 2013	ITF Clermont-Ferrand, France	Hard (i)	(Poland) Marta Domachowska	(Russia) Margarita Gasparyan (Ukraine) Alyona Sotnikova	5–7, 6–4, [10–8]
Runner-up	4.	13 October 2013	Open de Touraine, France	Hard (i)	(Czech Republic) Andrea Hlaváčková	(France) Julie Coin (Croatia) Ana Vrljić	3–6, 6–4, [13–15]
Winner	10.	27 October 2013	Internationaux de Poitiers, France	Hard (i)	(Czech Republic) Lucie Hradecká	(United States) Christina McHale (Romania) Monica Niculescu	7–6^{(5)}, 6–2
Winner	11.	3 November 2013	Open Nantes Atlantique, France	Hard (i)	(Czech Republic) Lucie Hradecká	(France) Stéphanie Foretz (Czech Republic) Eva Hrdinová	6–3, 6–2
Winner	12.	20 February 2014	ITF Kreuzlingen, Switzerland	Carpet (i)	(Czech Republic) Eva Birnerová	(Serbia) Aleksandra Krunić (Switzerland) Amra Sadiković	6–1, 4–6, [10–6]
Runner-up	5.	31 March 2014	ITF Dijon, France	Hard (i)	(Czech Republic) Martina Borecká	(Hungary) Réka Luca Jani (Bulgaria) Isabella Shinikova	3–6, 5–7
Runner-up	6.	21 April 2014	ITF Istanbul, Turkey	Hard	(Serbia) Aleksandra Krunić	(Czech Republic) Petra Krejsová (Czech Republic) Tereza Smitková	6–1, 6–7^{(2)}, [9–11]
Winner	13.	16 May 2014	ITF Prague Open, Czech Republic	Clay	(Czech Republic) Lucie Hradecká	(Czech Republic) Lucie Šafářová (Czech Republic) Andrea Hlaváčková	6–3, 6–2
Winner	14.	20 July 2014	Carson Challenger, United States	Hard	(Australia) Olivia Rogowska	(United States) Samantha Crawford (United States) Sachia Vickery	7–6^{(4)}, 6–1
Winner	15.	24 September 2016	ITF Albuquerque, United States	Hard	(United States) Maria Sanchez	(Belgium) Elise Mertens (Luxembourg) Mandy Minella	6–2, 6–4
Winner	16.	2 October 2016	Las Vegas Open, United States	Hard	(United States) Maria Sanchez	(United States) Jamie Loeb (South Africa) Chanel Simmonds	7–5, 6–1
Winner	17.	30 October 2016	Tennis Classic of Macon, United States	Hard	(United States) Taylor Townsend	(United States) Sabrina Santamaria (United States) Keri Wong	3–6, 6–2, [10–6]
Winner	18.	5 November 2016	Tevlin Women's Challenger, Canada	Hard (i)	(Canada) Gabriela Dabrowski	(United States) Ashley Weinhold (United States) Caitlin Whoriskey	6–4, 6–3
Winner	19.	12 November 2016	Waco Showdown, United States	Hard	(United States) Taylor Townsend	(Romania) Mihaela Buzărnescu (Mexico) Renata Zarazúa	w/o
Runner-up	7.	3 November 2017	Open Nantes Atlantique, France	Hard (i)	(Netherlands) Lesley Kerkhove	(France) Manon Arcangioli (France) Shérazad Reix	2–6, 3–6
Winner	20.	10 February 2018	GB Pro-Series Loughborough, UK	Hard (i)	(Netherlands) Bibiane Schoofs	(United Kingdom) Tara Moore (Switzerland) Conny Perrin	6–7^{(5)}, 6–1, [10–6]
Runner-up	8.	21 July 2018	ITS Cup, Czech Republic	Clay	(Czech Republic) Lucie Hradecká	(Czech Republic) Petra Krejsová (Czech Republic) Jesika Malečková	2–6, 1–6
Runner-up	9.	21 September 2018	ITF Lisbon, Portugal	Hard	(Czech Republic) Tereza Martincová	(Finland) Emma Laine (United Kingdom) Samantha Murray	5–7, 4–6
Winner	21.	12 October 2018	ITF Óbidos, Portugal	Carpet	(United States) Ingrid Neel	(Spain) Cristina Bucșa (Latvia) Diāna Marcinkeviča	6–2, 6–2
Winner	22.	6 January 2019	ITF Hong Kong	Hard	(Czech Republic) Barbora Štefková	(Chinese Taipei) Chen Pei-hsuan (Chinese Taipei) Wu Fang-hsien	6–4, 6–7^{(3)}, [12–10]
Winner	23.	29 June 2024	ITF Alkmaar, Netherlands	Clay	(Netherlands) Sarah van Emst	(New Zealand) Valentina Ivanov (Denmark) Rebecca Munk Mortensen	6–4, 6–4
Winner	24.	6 July 2024	Amstelveen Open, Netherlands	Clay	(Netherlands) Eva Vedder	Victoria Kan; Ekaterina Makarova	w/o

== World TeamTennis ==
Krajicek was named 2016 WTT Female Rookie of the Year playing for the Springfield Lasers. She was tied for fifth in the league with teammate Pauline Parmentier in winning percentage in women's doubles and was also fifth in mixed doubles.

Preceded by Kirsten Flipkens	ITF Junior World Champion; 2004	Succeeded by Victoria Azarenka
