= 2014 Suzhou Ladies Open – Singles =

WTA 125K series tennis singles tournament

Singles
- 2014 Suzhou Ladies Open

Final
- Champion: (Germany) Anna-Lena Friedsam
- Runner-up: (China) Duan Yingying
- Score: 6–1, 6–3

Events
Singles	Doubles
- Suzhou Ladies Open

Shahar Pe'er was the defending champion, having won the event in 2013, however she chose not to participate.

Anna-Lena Friedsam won the title, defeating Duan Yingying in the final, 6–1, 6–3.

== Seeds ==
1. (Slovakia) Jana Čepelová (semifinals)
2. (Austria) Patricia Mayr-Achleitner (quarterfinals)
3. (Thailand) Luksika Kumkhum (first round)
4. (Germany) Anna-Lena Friedsam (champion)
5. (Russia) Ksenia Pervak (first round)
6. (Turkey) Çağla Büyükakçay (first round)
7. (Ukraine) Kateryna Kozlova (quarterfinals)
8. (China) Zheng Saisai (quarterfinals)

== Main draw ==
Key

- Q = Qualifier
- WC = Wild card
- LL = Lucky loser
- Alt = Alternate
- ITF = ITF entry
- PR = Protected ranking
- SR = Special ranking
- SE = Special exempt
- JE = Junior exempt
- JR = Junior Accelerator Programme entrant
- CO = College Accelerator Programme entrant
- NG = Next Gen Accelerator Program entrant
- w/o = Walkover
- r = Retired
- d = Defaulted

=== Finals ===
Semifinals
1	(Slovakia) Jana Čepelová	4	3
4	(Germany) Anna-Lena Friedsam	6	6
(Japan) Misa Eguchi	6	3	2
(China) Duan Yingying	2	6	6

Final
4	(Germany) Anna-Lena Friedsam	6	6
(China) Duan Yingying	1	3

=== Top half ===
First round
1	(Slovakia) J Čepelová	6	6
(United Kingdom) E Webley-Smith	3	3
(Japan) E Hozumi	6	3
(Ukraine) N Kichenok	3	0	r
WC	(China) Z Yang	6	6
WC	(China) Y Li	0	2
(Uzbekistan) N Abduraimova	4	2
8/WC	(China) S Zheng	6	6
4	(Germany) A-L Friedsam	6	6
(China) Y Xin	2	0
(Hungary) M Czink	5	4
(Croatia) P Martić	7	6
(Hong Kong) L Zhang	7^{7}	7
(Georgia (country)) S Shapatava	6^{2}	5
(China) L Zhu	3	0
7	(Ukraine) K Kozlova	6	6

Second round
1	(Slovakia) J Čepelová	6	6
(Japan) E Hozumi	1	4
WC	(China) Z Yang	0	4
8/WC	(China) S Zheng	6	6
4	(Germany) A-L Friedsam	6	6
(Croatia) P Martić	3	2
(Hong Kong) L Zhang	3	7	1
7	(Ukraine) K Kozlova	6	5	6

Quarterfinals
1	(Slovakia) J Čepelová	6	7^{9}
8/WC	(China) S Zheng	1	6^{7}
4	(Germany) A-L Friedsam	6	6
7	(Ukraine) K Kozlova	3	4

Semifinals
1	(Slovakia) J Čepelová	4	3
4	(Germany) A-L Friedsam	6	6

=== Bottom half ===
First round
6	(Turkey) Ç Büyükakçay	6^{3}	6	6^{3}
(Ukraine) L Kichenok	7^{7}	3	7^{7}
(Japan) M Eguchi	6	1	7^{7}
(Australia) Ar Rodionova	3	6	6^{3}
(Chinese Taipei) S-y Hsieh	2	0
(Japan) R Ozaki	6	6
(Chinese Taipei) C-w Chan	6	6
3	(Thailand) L Kumkhum	4	4
5	(Russia) K Pervak	3	4
(China) Y Duan	6	6
(China) Y Wang	1	0
WC	(China) F Liu	6	6
(China) Y Yuan	1	1
(Poland) M Linette	6	6
(China) A Zhu	1	0
2	(Austria) P Mayr-Achleitner	6	6

Second round
(Ukraine) L Kichenok	0	1
(Japan) M Eguchi	6	6
(Japan) R Ozaki	6	6
(Chinese Taipei) C-w Chan	3	2
(China) Y Duan	0	7^{7}	6
WC	(China) F Liu	6	6^{4}	4
(Poland) M Linette	6^{3}	5
2	(Austria) P Mayr-Achleitner	7^{7}	7

Quarterfinals
(Japan) M Eguchi	7^{7}	6
(Japan) R Ozaki	6^{5}	0
(China) Y Duan	6	6
2	(Austria) P Mayr-Achleitner	4	3

Semifinals
(Japan) M Eguchi	6	3	2
(China) Y Duan	2	6	6
