= Suzhou Ladies Open =

Tournament information
- Event name: Suzhou Open
- Location: Suzhou, China
- Venue: Sungent International Tennis Center (2025-); Suzhou TC (2019)
- Category: WTA 125 (2013-2014, 2025-); ITF Women's Circuit (2015-2019)
- Surface: Hard
- Draw: 32S/16Q/16D
- Prize money: $115,000 (2026)

Current champions (2026)
- Singles: (Slovakia) Rebecca Šramková
- Doubles: (Chinese Taipei) Li Yu-yun (China) Zhang Ying

The Suzhou Ladies Open (Chinese: 宿州国际网球公开赛; pinyin: Sùzhōu Guójì Wǎngqiú Gōngkāi Sài) is a tournament for professional female tennis players played on outdoor hard courts. The event is held in Suzhou, China, since 2012. However, it was not staged between 2020 and 2024 due to various reasons. It was classified as a $100,000 ITF Women's Circuit tournament in 2012 and from 2015 until 2019. It was part of the WTA 125K series from 2013 to 2014 and returned to the WTA 125 Tour in 2025.

== Past finals ==
=== Singles ===
Year	Champion	Runner-up	Score
2026	(Slovakia) Rebecca Šramková	(Japan) Kyōka Okamura	6–3, 6–1
2025	(Switzerland) Viktorija Golubic	(United States) Katie Volynets	4–6, 6–4, 6–4
↑ WTA 125 event ↑
2020–24	Not held		
2019	(China) Peng Shuai	(China) Zhu Lin	6–2, 3–6, 6–2
2018	(China) Zheng Saisai	(Slovakia) Jana Čepelová	7–5, 6–1
↑ ITF 100K event ↑
2017	(Italy) Sara Errani	(China) Guo Hanyu	6–1, 6–0
2016	(Chinese Taipei) Chang Kai-chen	(China) Wang Yafan	4–6, 6–2, 6–1
2015	(China) Zhang Kailin	(China) Duan Yingying	1–6, 6–3, 6–4
↑ ITF 50K event ↑
2014	(Germany) Anna-Lena Friedsam	(China) Duan Yingying	6–1, 6–3
2013	(Israel) Shahar Pe'er	(China) Zheng Saisai	6–2, 2–6, 6–3
↑ WTA 125 event ↑
2012	(Chinese Taipei) Hsieh Su-wei	(China) Duan Yingying	6–2, 6–2
↑ ITF 100K event ↑

=== Doubles ===
Year	Champions	Runners-up	Score
2026	(Chinese Taipei) Li Yu-yun (China) Zhang Ying	Tatiana Prozorova; Aliaksandra Sasnovich	6–3, 6–0
2025	(Indonesia) Aldila Sutjiadi (Indonesia) Janice Tjen	(Poland) Katarzyna Kawa (Japan) Makoto Ninomiya	6–4, 6–3
↑ WTA 125 event ↑
2020–24	Not held		
2019	(China) Jiang Xinyu (China) Tang Qianhui	(India) Ankita Raina (Netherlands) Rosalie van der Hoek	3–6, 6–3, [10–5]
2018	(Japan) Misaki Doi (Japan) Nao Hibino	(Thailand) Luksika Kumkhum (Thailand) Peangtarn Plipuech	6–2, 6–3
↑ ITF 100K event ↑
2017	(United States) Jacqueline Cako (Serbia) Nina Stojanović	(Japan) Eri Hozumi (Japan) Miyu Kato	2–6, 7–5, [10–2]
2016	(Japan) Hiroko Kuwata (Japan) Akiko Omae	(United States) Jacqueline Cako (Uzbekistan) Sabina Sharipova	6–1, 6–3
2015	(China) Yang Zhaoxuan (China) Zhang Yuxuan	(China) Tian Ran (China) Zhang Kailin	7–6^{(7–4)}, 6–2
↑ ITF 50K event ↑
2014	(Chinese Taipei) Chan Chin-wei (Chinese Taipei) Chuang Chia-jung	(Japan) Misa Eguchi (Japan) Eri Hozumi	6–1, 3–6, [10–7]
2013	(Hungary) Tímea Babos (Netherlands) Michaëlla Krajicek	(China) Han Xinyun (Japan) Eri Hozumi	6–2, 6–2
↑ WTA 125 event ↑
2012	(Switzerland) Timea Bacsinszky (France) Caroline Garcia	(China) Yang Zhaoxuan (China) Zhao Yijing	7–5, 6–3
↑ ITF 100K event ↑
