= 2018 Jin'an Open – Doubles =

Doubles
- 2018 Jin'an Open

Final
- Champions: (United Kingdom) Harriet Dart (India) Ankita Raina
- Runners-up: (China) Liu Fangzhou (China) Xun Fangying
- Score: 6–3, 6–3

Events
Singles	Doubles
← 2017 ·	Jin'an Open	· 2019 →

Jiang Xinyu and Tang Qianhui were the defending champions, but they lost in the first round to Gai Ao and Zheng Wushuang.

Harriet Dart and Ankita Raina won the title after defeating Liu Fangzhou and Xun Fangying 6–3, 6–3 in the final.

== Seeds ==
1. (Bulgaria) Aleksandrina Naydenova / (Japan) Makoto Ninomiya (first round)
2. (China) Jiang Xinyu / (China) Tang Qianhui (first round)
3. (United Kingdom) Harriet Dart / (India) Ankita Raina (champions)
4. (China) Guo Hanyu / (India) Karman Thandi (semifinals)

== Draw ==
=== Key ===
- Q = Qualifier
- WC = Wild card
- LL = Lucky loser
- Alt = Alternate
- SE = Special exempt
- PR = Protected ranking
- ITF = ITF entry
- JE = Junior exempt
- w/o = Walkover
- r = Retired
- d = Defaulted
- SR = Special ranking

=== Draw ===
First round
1	(Bulgaria) A Naydenova (Japan) M Ninomiya	6	3	[11]
(China) F Liu (China) F Xun	4	6	[13]
(China) S Xu (China) Y Zhang	6	6
(China) X Sun (China) Q Zhao	2	3
4	(China) H Guo (India) K Thandi	6	6
WC	(China) Yi Yuan (China) W Zhu	2	0
(Japan) M Minokoshi (Japan) E Sema	6	6
WC	(China) Y Liu (China) M Wang	2	0
(China) S Guo (China) Z Wei	3	4
(Indonesia) B Gumulya (Indonesia) J Rompies	6	6
(Russia) N Kukharchuk (United Kingdom) E Webley-Smith	4	3
3	(United Kingdom) H Dart (India) A Raina	6	6
(China) J Chen (China) X You	4	6^{8}
(China) S Feng (China) J Kang	6	7^{10}
(China) A Gai (China) W Zheng	4	7^{7}	[10]
2	(China) X Jiang (China) Q Tang	6	6^{5}	[7]

Quarterfinals
(China) F Liu (China) F Xun	3	6	[10]
(China) S Xu (China) Y Zhang	6	4	[7]
4	(China) H Guo (India) K Thandi	2	6	[11]
(Japan) M Minokoshi (Japan) E Sema	6	3	[9]
(Indonesia) B Gumulya (Indonesia) J Rompies	5	6	[8]
3	(United Kingdom) H Dart (India) A Raina	7	2	[10]
(China) S Feng (China) J Kang	6	3	[14]
(China) A Gai (China) W Zheng	4	6	[12]

Semifinals
(China) F Liu (China) F Xun	6	6^{4}	[10]
4	(China) H Guo (India) K Thandi	3	7^{7}	[6]
3	(United Kingdom) H Dart (India) A Raina	2	7	[10]
(China) S Feng (China) J Kang	6	5	[5]

Final
(China) F Liu (China) F Xun	3	3
3	(United Kingdom) H Dart (India) A Raina	6	6
