= 2018 Jin'an Open =

- Date: 7–13 May
- Edition: 2nd
- Category: ITF Women's Circuit
- Prize money: $60,000
- Surface: Hard
- Location: Lu'an, China

Champions

Singles
- (China) Zhu Lin

Doubles
- (United Kingdom) Harriet Dart / (India) Ankita Raina
← 2017 ·	Jin'an Open	· 2019 →

The 2018 Jin'an Open was a professional tennis tournament played on outdoor hard courts. It was the second edition of the tournament and was part of the 2018 ITF Women's Circuit. It took place in Lu'an, China, on 7–13 May 2018.

== Singles main draw entrants ==
=== Seeds ===
Country	Player	Rank^{1}	Seed
CHN	Zhu Lin	120	1
CHN	Liu Fangzhou	160	2
IND	Ankita Raina	193	3
GBR	Harriet Dart	215	4
IND	Karman Thandi	267	5
CHN	Xun Fangying	287	6
JPN	Erika Sema	301	7
JPN	Mai Minokoshi	306	8

- ^{1} Rankings as of 30 April 2018.

=== Other entrants ===
The following players received a wildcard into the singles main draw:

- (China) Liu Yanni
- (China) Wang Meiling
- (China) Zhao Qianqian

The following players received entry from the qualifying draw:

- (China) Jiang Xinyu
- (China) Sun Ziyue
- (China) Tang Qianhui
- (China) Yuan Chengyiyi

== Champions ==
=== Singles ===
- (China) Zhu Lin def. (China) Liu Fangzhou, 6–0, 6–2

=== Doubles ===
- (United Kingdom) Harriet Dart / (India) Ankita Raina def. (China) Liu Fangzhou / (China) Xun Fangying, 6–3, 6–3
