= 2024 Jin'an Open – Women's doubles =

Women's doubles
- 2024 Jin'an Open

Final
- Champions: (China) Tang Qianhui (China) Zheng Wushuang
- Runners-up: (Thailand) Luksika Kumkhum (Thailand) Peangtarn Plipuech
- Score: 6–1, 6–2

Events
Singles	men	women
Doubles	men	women
← 2019 ·	Jin'an Open	· 2025 →

Beatrice Gumulya and You Xiaodi were the defending champions but chose not to participate.

Tang Qianhui and Zheng Wushuang won title, defeating Luksika Kumkhum and Peangtarn Plipuech in the final, 6–1, 6–2.

== Seeds ==
1. (Thailand) Luksika Kumkhum / (Thailand) Peangtarn Plipuech (final)
2. (China) Tang Qianhui / (China) Zheng Wushuang (champions)
3. (Chinese Taipei) Cho I-hsuan / (Chinese Taipei) Cho Yi-tsen (first round)
4. (United States) Haley Giavara / (Chinese Taipei) Li Yu-yun (semifinals)

== Draw ==
=== Key ===
- Q = Qualifier
- WC = Wild card
- LL = Lucky loser
- Alt = Alternate
- SE = Special exempt
- PR = Protected ranking
- ITF = ITF entry
- JE = Junior exempt
- w/o = Walkover
- r = Retired
- d = Defaulted
- SR = Special ranking

First round
1	(Thailand) L Kumkhum (Thailand) P Plipuech	6	6
(China) M Guo (China) F Liu	4	2
(China) S Feng (China) J Wang	6	6
(Japan) M Ayukawa (Slovakia) V Morvayová	4	1
3	(Chinese Taipei) I-h Cho (Chinese Taipei) Y-t Cho	6	6^{6}	[8]
(Chinese Taipei) F-a Lin (China) C Yuan	1	7^{8}	[10]
WC	(China) Y Cai (China) M Chen	0	0
(China) N Dong (China) Jin Lu	6	6
(Thailand) T Naklo (Thailand) L Tararudee	7^{7}	6^{4}	[10]
(China) Y Ren (China) X Yao	6^{3}	7^{7}	[6]
(China) Z Li (China) H Shi	5	6	[14]
4	(United States) H Giavara (Chinese Taipei) Y-y Li	7	4	[16]
(China) Y Dang (China) F Xun	4	4
(Hong Kong) H-c Wu (China) Y Yang	6	6
(China) Jia Lu (China) M Wang	2	3
2	(China) Q Tang (China) W Zheng	6	6

Quarterfinals
1	(Thailand) L Kumkhum (Thailand) P Plipuech	6	4	[10]
(China) S Feng (China) J Wang	4	6	[6]
(Chinese Taipei) F-a Lin (China) C Yuan	6	6
(China) N Dong (China) Jin Lu	4	4
(Thailand) T Naklo (Thailand) L Tararudee	6	1	[7]
4	(United States) H Giavara (Chinese Taipei) Y-y Li	2	6	[10]
(Hong Kong) H-c Wu (China) Y Yang	2	0
2	(China) Q Tang (China) W Zheng	6	6

Semifinals
1	(Thailand) L Kumkhum (Thailand) P Plipuech	6	6
(Chinese Taipei) F-a Lin (China) C Yuan	4	1
4	(United States) H Giavara (Chinese Taipei) Y-y Li	1	6^{4}
2	(China) Q Tang (China) W Zheng	6	7^{7}

Final
1	(Thailand) L Kumkhum (Thailand) P Plipuech	1	2
2	(China) Q Tang (China) W Zheng	6	6
