= 2019 Jin'an Open =

- Date: 6–12 May 2019
- Edition: 3rd
- Category: ITF Women's World Tennis Tour
- Prize money: $60,000
- Surface: Carpet
- Location: Lu'an, China

Champions

Singles
- (China) Han Xinyun

Doubles
- (Indonesia) Beatrice Gumulya / (China) You Xiaodi
← 2018 ·	Jin'an Open	· 2024 →

The 2019 Jin'an Open was a professional tennis tournament played on outdoor hard courts. It was the third edition of the tournament which was part of the 2019 ITF Women's World Tennis Tour. It took place in Lu'an, China between 6 and 12 May 2019.

== Singles main-draw entrants ==
=== Seeds ===
Country	Player	Rank^{1}	Seed
CHN	Zhu Lin	94	1
IND	Ankita Raina	173	2
CHN	Liu Fangzhou	182	3
CHN	Xu Shilin	199	4
CHN	Xun Fangying	210	5
CHN	Han Xinyun	212	6
CHN	Ma Shuyue	218	7
CHN	Zhang Yuxuan	236	8

- ^{1} Rankings are as of 29 April 2019.

=== Other entrants ===
The following players received wildcards into the singles main draw:

- (China) Guo Hanyu
- (China) Sun Xuliu
- (China) Wang Meiling
- (China) Zhu Wanning

The following player received entry as a special exempt:

- (Hong Kong) Eudice Chong

The following players received entry from the qualifying draw:

- (United States) Catherine Harrison
- (New Zealand) Paige Hourigan
- (China) Jiang Xinyu
- (China) Kang Jiaqi
- (China) Ma Yexin
- (United States) Anastasia Nefedova
- (Japan) Akiko Omae
- (China) Sun Ziyue

== Champions ==
=== Singles ===
- (China) Han Xinyun def. (China) Duan Yingying, 4–6, 6–2, 6–2

=== Doubles ===
- (Indonesia) Beatrice Gumulya / (China) You Xiaodi def. (Japan) Mai Minokoshi / (Japan) Erika Sema, 6–1, 7–5
