= 2019 Suzhou Ladies Open – Singles =

Singles
- 2019 Suzhou Ladies Open

Final
- Champion: (China) Peng Shuai
- Runner-up: (China) Zhu Lin
- Score: 6–2, 3–6, 6–2

Events
Singles	Doubles
← 2018 ·	Suzhou Ladies Open	· 2025 →

Zheng Saisai was the defending champion, but chose not to participate.

Peng Shuai won the title, defeating Zhu Lin in the final, 6–2, 3–6, 6–2.

== Seeds ==
1. (China) Wang Yafan (semifinals)
2. (Japan) Nao Hibino (semifinals)
3. (China) Peng Shuai (champion)
4. (China) Zhu Lin (final)
5. (United Kingdom) Harriet Dart (first round, retired)
6. (China) Wang Xinyu (second round)
7. (Japan) Kurumi Nara (second round)
8. (Russia) Valeria Savinykh (first round)

== Draw ==
=== Key ===
- Q = Qualifier
- WC = Wild card
- LL = Lucky loser
- Alt = Alternate
- ITF = ITF entry
- PR = Protected ranking
- SR = Special ranking
- SE = Special exempt
- JE = Junior exempt
- JR = Junior Accelerator Programme entrant
- CO = College Accelerator Programme entrant
- NG = Next Gen Accelerator Program entrant
- w/o = Walkover
- r = Retired
- d = Defaulted

=== Finals ===
Semifinals
1	(China) Wang Yafan	3	3
4	(China) Zhu Lin	6	6
3	(China) Peng Shuai	6	7^{7}
2	(Japan) Nao Hibino	4	6^{2}

Final
4	(China) Zhu Lin	2	6	2
3	(China) Peng Shuai	6	3	6

=== Top half ===
First round
1	(China) Y Wang	6	1	6
(China) Jia Lu	2	6	2
(China) S Ma	3	3
(Bulgaria) A Naydenova	6	6
(Serbia) N Kostić	6	6
(China) X You	3	1
WC	(China) S Feng	3	1
6	(China) Xin Wang	6	6
4	(China) L Zhu	7^{11}	6
(China) S Xu	6^{9}	3
Q	(China) X Jiang	6	1	0
(Australia) Ar Rodionova	3	6	6
Q	(China) Z Sun	3	1
Q	(China) H Guo	6	6
(India) A Raina	6	6
8	(Russia) V Savinykh	1	1

Second round
1	(China) Y Wang	6	6
(Bulgaria) A Naydenova	1	0
(Serbia) N Kostić	6	6
6	(China) Xin Wang	3	4
4	(China) L Zhu	3	6	7^{7}
(Australia) Ar Rodionova	6	1	6^{3}
Q	(China) H Guo	6	1	3
(India) A Raina	1	6	6

Quarterfinals
1	(China) Y Wang	6	6
(Serbia) N Kostić	1	4
4	(China) L Zhu	6	6
(India) A Raina	4	4

Semifinals
1	(China) Y Wang	3	3
4	(China) L Zhu	6	6

=== Bottom half ===
First round
5	(United Kingdom) H Dart	3	0^{r}
Q	(Thailand) P Plipuech	6	2
Q	(United Kingdom) E Webley-Smith	6	6
WC	(China) Yi Yuan	2	1
WC	(China) Y Liu	6	6
Q	(China) M Wang	2	3
(China) F Xun	3	4
3	(China) S Peng	6	6
7	(Japan) K Nara	6	6
PR	(China) X Gao	2	4
Q	(Denmark) C Tauson	6	6
Q	(China) M Guo	2	3
WC	(China) X Sun	7	4	2
(China) F Liu	5	6	6
(Serbia) J Jakšić	4	4
2	(Japan) N Hibino	6	6

Second round
Q	(Thailand) P Plipuech	7^{7}	6
Q	(United Kingdom) E Webley-Smith	6^{0}	4
WC	(China) Y Liu	0	2
3	(China) S Peng	6	6
7	(Japan) K Nara	4	5
Q	(Denmark) C Tauson	6	7
(China) F Liu	2	1
2	(Japan) N Hibino	6	6

Quarterfinals
Q	(Thailand) P Plipuech	2	3
3	(China) S Peng	6	6
Q	(Denmark) C Tauson	2	0
2	(Japan) N Hibino	6	6

Semifinals
3	(China) S Peng	6	7^{7}
2	(Japan) N Hibino	4	6^{2}
