= 2018 Jin'an Open – Singles =

Singles
- 2018 Jin'an Open

Final
- Champion: (China) Zhu Lin
- Runner-up: (China) Liu Fangzhou
- Score: 6–0, 6–2

Events
Singles	Doubles
← 2017 ·	Jin'an Open	· 2019 →

Zhu Lin was the defending champion and successfully defended her title, defeating Liu Fangzhou in the final, 6–0, 6–2.

== Seeds ==
1. (China) Zhu Lin (champion)
2. (China) Liu Fangzhou (final)
3. (India) Ankita Raina (quarterfinals)
4. (United Kingdom) Harriet Dart (semifinals)
5. (India) Karman Thandi (quarterfinals)
6. (China) Xun Fangying (semifinals)
7. (Japan) Erika Sema (quarterfinals)
8. (Japan) Mai Minokoshi (quarterfinals)

== Draw ==
=== Key ===
- Q = Qualifier
- WC = Wild card
- LL = Lucky loser
- Alt = Alternate
- SE = Special exempt
- PR = Protected ranking
- ITF = ITF entry
- JE = Junior exempt
- w/o = Walkover
- r = Retired
- d = Defaulted
- SR = Special ranking

=== Finals ===
Semifinals
1	(China) Zhu Lin	1	6	6
4	(United Kingdom) Harriet Dart	6	4	3
6	(China) Xun Fangying	6^{4}	1
2	(China) Liu Fangzhou	7^{7}	6

Final
1	(China) Zhu Lin	6	6
2	(China) Liu Fangzhou	0	2

=== Top half ===
First round
1	(China) L Zhu	6	6
(China) S Feng	3	2
(Bulgaria) A Naydenova	4	5
(China) Yu Yuan	6	7
(United Kingdom) E Webley-Smith	6	3	6^{4}
Q	(China) X Jiang	4	6	7^{7}
(Russia) N Kukharchuk	2	4
8	(Japan) M Minokoshi	6	6
4	(United Kingdom) H Dart	6	6
Q	(China) Q Tang	2	3
(China) W Zheng	6	7^{7}
(China) J Kang	3	6^{3}
(China) Y Zhang	6	6
Q	(China) C Yuan	2	1
(China) X Sun	3	2
5	(India) K Thandi	6	6

Second round
1	(China) L Zhu	7^{7}	6
(China) Yu Yuan	6^{5}	3
Q	(China) X Jiang	4	2
8	(Japan) M Minokoshi	6	6
4	(United Kingdom) H Dart	6	6
(China) W Zheng	3	1
(China) Y Zhang	4	7	1
5	(India) K Thandi	6	5	6

Quarterfinals
1	(China) L Zhu	5	6	6
8	(Japan) M Minokoshi	7	4	4
4	(United Kingdom) H Dart	2	6	6
5	(India) K Thandi	6	2	3

Semifinals
1	(China) L Zhu	1	6	6
4	(United Kingdom) H Dart	6	4	3

=== Bottom half ===
First round
6	(China) F Xun	6	6
(China) S Guo	2	1
WC	(China) Q Zhao	1	3
(Japan) M Ninomiya	6	6
(China) H Guo	6^{2}	6	6
WC	(China) Y Liu	7^{7}	4	1
(China) A Gai	1	6^{6}
3	(India) A Raina	6	7^{8}
7	(Japan) E Sema	7	4	6
(China) X You	5	6	3
WC	(China) M Wang	6	6
(China) K Zhang	1	3
(China) Z Wei	2	2
(China) S Xu	6	6
Q	(China) Z Sun	2	2
2	(China) F Liu	6	6

Second round
6	(China) F Xun	6	6
(Japan) M Ninomiya	1	2
(China) H Guo	4	5
3	(India) A Raina	6	7
7	(Japan) E Sema	7	6
WC	(China) M Wang	5	3
(China) S Xu	4	4
2	(China) F Liu	6	6

Quarterfinals
6	(China) F Xun	6^{5}	6	7^{7}
3	(India) A Raina	7^{7}	3	6^{3}
7	(Japan) E Sema	4	2
2	(China) F Liu	6	6

Semifinals
6	(China) F Xun	6^{4}	1
2	(China) F Liu	7^{7}	6
