= 2024 Jin'an Open =

Tennis tournament

- Date: 6–19 May 2024
- Edition: 4th (women); 5th (men)
- Category: ITF Women's World Tennis Tour; ITF Men's World Tennis Tour
- Prize money: $60,000 (women) $25,000 (men)
- Surface: Hard / Outdoor
- Location: Lu'an, China

Champions

Men's singles
- (China) Sun Fajing

Women's singles
- (China) Wang Meiling

Men's doubles
- (New Zealand) Ajeet Rai / (China) Sun Fajing

Women's doubles
- (China) Tang Qianhui / (China) Zheng Wushuang
← 2019 ·	Jin'an Open	· 2025 →

The 2024 Jin'an Open was a professional tennis tournament played on outdoor hard courts. It was the fourth (women) and fifth (men) editions of the tournament, which were part of the 2024 ITF Women's World Tennis Tour and 2024 ITF Men's World Tennis Tour. It took place in Lu'an, China, between 6 and 19 May 2024.

== Champions ==
=== Women's singles ===
- (China) Wang Meiling def. (China) Yao Xinxin, 7–5, 6–2

=== Men's singles ===
- (China) Sun Fajing def. (China) Mo Yecong, 6–3, 6–1

=== Women's doubles ===
- (China) Tang Qianhui / (China) Zheng Wushuang def. (Thailand) Luksika Kumkhum / (Thailand) Peangtarn Plipuech, 6–1, 6–2

=== Men's doubles ===
- (New Zealand) Ajeet Rai / (China) Sun Fajing def. (China) Cui Jie / (South Korea) Lee Duck-hee, 6–2, 6–2

== Women's singles main draw entrants ==
=== Seeds ===
Country	Player	Rank	Seed
CHN	Wei Sijia	185	1
THA	Lanlana Tararudee	226	2
CHN	Lu Jiajing	351	3
THA	Thasaporn Naklo	397	4
JPN	Kyōka Okamura	398	5
CHN	Li Zongyu	412	6
CHN	Liu Fangzhou	423	7
USA	Haley Giavara	433	8

- Rankings are as of 22 April 2024.

=== Other entrants ===
The following players received wildcards into the singles main draw:

- (China) Chen Mengyi
- (China) Dong Na
- (China) Feng Shuo
- (China) Guo Meiqi

The following player received entry into the singles main draw using a special ranking:

- (China) Wang Qiang

The following players received entry from the qualifying draw:

- (Chinese Taipei) Cho Yi-tsen
- (China) Dang Yiming
- (China) Li Jiayou
- (China) Liu Yanni
- (China) Lu Jingjing
- (China) Sun Yingqun
- (China) Wei Sijia
- (China) Zhao Xichen

== Men's singles main draw entrants ==
=== Seeds ===
Country	Player	Rank	Seed
CHN	Bai Yan	333	1
CHN	Sun Fajing	425	2
KOR	Shin San-hui	465	3
~~CHN~~	~~Li Zhe~~	~~513~~	~~4~~
CHN	Li Hanwen	542	5
THA	Maximus Jones	544	6
JPN	Yuki Mochizuki	587	7
NZL	Ajeet Rai	626	8

- Rankings are as of 6 May 2024.

=== Other entrants ===
The following players received wildcards into the singles main draw:

- (China) Dong Zhenxiong
- (China) Sun Zhengyu
- (China) Zhang Changli

The following players received entry from the qualifying draw:

- (China) Chen Xingdao
- (South Korea) Han Seon-yong
- (Japan) Ryotaro Matsumura
- (South Korea) Park Seung-min
- (South Korea) Shin Woo-bin
- (South Korea) Sim Sung-been
- (China) Yu Bingyu
- (China) Zhou Mingzhou

The following player received entry as a lucky loser:

- (China) Wang Qiulin
