= 2024 Jin'an Open – Women's singles =

Women's singles
- 2024 Jin'an Open

Final
- Champion: (China) Wang Meiling
- Runner-up: (China) Yao Xinxin
- Score: 7–5, 6–2

Events
Singles	men	women
Doubles	men	women
← 2019 ·	Jin'an Open	· 2025 →

Han Xinyun was the defending champion, having won the previous edition in 2019, but chose not to participate.

Wang Meiling won the title, defeating Yao Xinxin in the final, 7–5, 6–2.

== Seeds ==
1. (China) Wei Sijia (first round)
2. (Thailand) Lanlana Tararudee (quarterfinals)
3. (China) Lu Jiajing (semifinals)
4. (Thailand) Thasaporn Naklo (second round)
5. (Japan) Kyōka Okamura (second round)
6. (China) Li Zongyu (first round)
7. (China) Liu Fangzhou (second round)
8. (United States) Haley Giavara (second round)

== Draw ==
=== Key ===
- Q = Qualifier
- WC = Wild card
- LL = Lucky loser
- Alt = Alternate
- SE = Special exempt
- PR = Protected ranking
- ITF = ITF entry
- JE = Junior exempt
- w/o = Walkover
- r = Retired
- d = Defaulted
- SR = Special ranking

=== Finals ===
Semifinals
(China) Wang Meiling	6	4	6
(Thailand) Peangtarn Plipuech	4	6	3
3	(China) Lu Jiajing	3	4
(China) Yao Xinxin	6	6

Final
(China) Wang Meiling	7	6
(China) Yao Xinxin	5	2

=== Top half ===
First round
1/Q	(China) S Wei	3	4
SR	(China) Q Wang	6	6
Q	(China) Y Sun	2	2
(China) Y Ren	6	6
(China) H Shi	5	5
(China) M Wang	7	7
(China) C Yuan	6	7
6	(China) Z Li	3	5
4	(Thailand) T Naklo	6	6
Q	(China) Y Liu	2	3
WC	(China) M Guo	2	3
(Thailand) P Plipuech	6	6
Q	(China) X Zhao	3	2
(Slovakia) V Morvayová	6	6
WC	(China) M Chen	7	0	2
8	(United States) H Giavara	5	6	6

Second round
SR	(China) Q Wang	6	7
(China) Y Ren	3	5
(China) M Wang	6	7^{7}
(China) C Yuan	3	6^{3}
4	(Thailand) T Naklo	6	3	3
(Thailand) P Plipuech	4	6	6
(Slovakia) V Morvayová	5	6	6
8	(United States) H Giavara	7	3	4

Quarterfinals
SR	(China) Q Wang	2	6	4
(China) M Wang	6	2	6
(Thailand) P Plipuech	7^{8}	6
(Slovakia) V Morvayová	6^{6}	0

Semifinals
(China) M Wang	6	4	6
(Thailand) P Plipuech	4	6	3

=== Bottom half ===
First round
5	(Japan) K Okamura	3	6	7^{7}
(China) W Zheng	6	3	6^{5}
Q	(Chinese Taipei) Y-t Cho	2	2
(China) J Wang	6	6
Q	(China) Y Dang	3	1
WC	(China) N Dong	6	6
(China) Y Yang	2	0
3	(China) Jia Lu	6	6
7	(China) F Liu	6	6
(Chinese Taipei) I-h Cho	4	2
WC	(China) S Feng	2	1
(China) X Yao	6	6
(Hong Kong) H-c Wu	6	3	1
Q	(China) Jin Lu	4	6	6
Q	(China) J Li	6	1	3
2	(Thailand) L Tararudee	2	6	6

Second round
5	(Japan) K Okamura	3	4
(China) J Wang	6	6
WC	(China) N Dong	4	0
3	(China) Jia Lu	6	6
7	(China) F Liu	6^{3}	4
(China) X Yao	7^{7}	6
Q	(China) Jin Lu	1	6	6^{2}
2	(Thailand) L Tararudee	6	3	7^{7}

Quarterfinals
(China) J Wang	6	5	3
3	(China) Jia Lu	1	7	6
(China) X Yao	6	6
2	(Thailand) L Tararudee	3	2

Semifinals
3	(China) Jia Lu	3	4
(China) X Yao	6	6
