= 2019 Suzhou Ladies Open =

- Date: 14–20 October 2019
- Edition: 8th
- Category: ITF Women's World Tennis Tour
- Prize money: $100,000
- Surface: Hard
- Location: Suzhou, China

Champions

Singles
- (China) Peng Shuai

Doubles
- (China) Jiang Xinyu / (China) Tang Qianhui
← 2018 ·	Suzhou Ladies Open	· 2025 →

The 2019 Suzhou Ladies Open was a professional tennis tournament played on outdoor hard courts. It was the eighth edition of the tournament which was part of the 2019 ITF Women's World Tennis Tour. It took place in Suzhou, China between 14 and 20 October 2019.

== Singles main-draw entrants ==
=== Seeds ===
Country	Player	Rank^{1}	Seed
CHN	Wang Yafan	47	1
JPN	Nao Hibino	90	2
CHN	Peng Shuai	96	3
CHN	Zhu Lin	106	4
GBR	Harriet Dart	133	5
CHN	Wang Xinyu	155	6
JPN	Kurumi Nara	159	7
RUS	Valeria Savinykh	164	8

- ^{1} Rankings are as of 7 October 2019.

=== Other entrants ===
The following players received wildcards into the singles main draw:

- (China) Feng Shuo
- (China) Liu Yanni
- (China) Sun Xuliu
- (China) Yuan Yi

The following player received entry using a special exempt:

- (China) Gao Xinyu

The following players received entry from the qualifying draw:

- (China) Guo Hanyu
- (China) Guo Meiqi
- (China) Jiang Xinyu
- (Thailand) Peangtarn Plipuech
- (China) Sun Ziyue
- (Denmark) Clara Tauson
- (China) Wang Meiling
- (United Kingdom) Emily Webley-Smith

== Champions ==
=== Singles ===
- (China) Peng Shuai def. (China) Zhu Lin, 6–2, 3–6, 6–2

=== Doubles ===
- (China) Jiang Xinyu / (China) Tang Qianhui def. (India) Ankita Raina / (Netherlands) Rosalie van der Hoek, 3–6, 6–3, [10–5]
