= 2019 Jin'an Open – Doubles =

Doubles
- 2019 Jin'an Open

Final
- Champions: (Indonesia) Beatrice Gumulya (China) You Xiaodi
- Runners-up: (Japan) Mai Minokoshi (Japan) Erika Sema
- Score: 6–1, 7–5

Events
Singles	Doubles
← 2018 ·	Jin'an Open	· 2024 →

Harriet Dart and Ankita Raina were the defending champions, but Dart chose not to participate. Raina partnered alongside Akiko Omae, but they lost in the first round to Cao Siqi and Xun Fangying.

Beatrice Gumulya and You Xiaodi won the title, defeating Mai Minokoshi and Erika Sema in the final, 6–1, 7–5.

== Seeds ==
1. (China) Jiang Xinyu / (China) Tang Qianhui (quarterfinals)
2. (Indonesia) Beatrice Gumulya / (China) You Xiaodi (champions)
3. (Japan) Akiko Omae / (India) Ankita Raina (first round)
4. (China) Kang Jiaqi / (Thailand) Peangtarn Plipuech (first round)

== Draw ==
=== Key ===
- Q = Qualifier
- WC = Wild card
- LL = Lucky loser
- Alt = Alternate
- SE = Special exempt
- PR = Protected ranking
- ITF = ITF entry
- JE = Junior exempt
- w/o = Walkover
- r = Retired
- d = Defaulted
- SR = Special ranking

=== Draw ===
First round
1	(China) X Jiang (China) Q Tang	6	6
WC	(China) X Sun (China) D Wang	3	4
(Hong Kong) K-y Ng (Russia) V Savinykh	2	4
(Japan) M Minokoshi (Japan) E Sema	6	6
4	(China) J Kang (Thailand) P Plipuech	2	0
(China) H Guo (China) Q Ye	6	6
(Chinese Taipei) Y-c Hsieh (Chinese Taipei) P-c Lee	6	6
WC	(China) Y Yang (China) Yu Zhang	1	1
(New Zealand) P Hourigan (Indonesia) A Sutjiadi	2	6	[7]
(China) S Xu (China) Y Yuan	6	4	[10]
(China) S Cao (China) F Xun	2	6	[10]
3	(Japan) A Omae (India) A Raina	6	3	[8]
(China) S Feng (China) Jin Lu	6	6
(China) F Liu (Hong Kong) L Zhang	2	2
WC	(China) Q Zhao (China) W Zheng	4	2
2	(Indonesia) B Gumulya (China) X You	6	6

Quarterfinals
1	(China) X Jiang (China) Q Tang	2	3
(Japan) M Minokoshi (Japan) E Sema	6	6
(China) H Guo (China) Q Ye	6	7^{7}
(Chinese Taipei) Y-c Hsieh (Chinese Taipei) P-c Lee	2	6^{3}
(China) S Xu (China) Y Yuan	6	6
(China) S Cao (China) F Xun	3	1
(China) S Feng (China) Jin Lu	5	1
2	(Indonesia) B Gumulya (China) X You	7	6

Semifinals
(Japan) M Minokoshi (Japan) E Sema	6	3	[10]
(China) H Guo (China) Q Ye	4	6	[4]
(China) S Xu (China) Y Yuan	0	4
2	(Indonesia) B Gumulya (China) X You	6	6

Final
(Japan) M Minokoshi (Japan) E Sema	1	5
2	(Indonesia) B Gumulya (China) X You	6	7
