= 2019 Jin'an Open – Singles =

Singles
- 2019 Jin'an Open

Final
- Champion: (China) Han Xinyun
- Runner-up: (China) Duan Yingying
- Score: 4–6, 6–2, 6–2

Events
Singles	Doubles
← 2018 ·	Jin'an Open	· 2024 →

Zhu Lin was the defending champion, but lost in the semifinals to Han Xinyun.

Han won the title, defeating Duan Yingying in the final, 4–6, 6–2, 6–2.

== Seeds ==
1. (China) Zhu Lin (semifinals)
2. (India) Ankita Raina (semifinals)
3. (China) Liu Fangzhou (second round)
4. (China) Xu Shilin (first round)
5. (China) Xun Fangying (second round, retired)
6. (China) Han Xinyun (champion)
7. (China) Ma Shuyue (quarterfinals)
8. (China) Zhang Yuxuan (first round)

== Draw ==
=== Key ===
- Q = Qualifier
- WC = Wild card
- LL = Lucky loser
- Alt = Alternate
- SE = Special exempt
- PR = Protected ranking
- ITF = ITF entry
- JE = Junior exempt
- w/o = Walkover
- r = Retired
- d = Defaulted
- SR = Special ranking

=== Finals ===
Semifinals
1	(China) Zhu Lin	4	4
6	(China) Han Xinyun	6	6
(China) Duan Yingying	6	1	6
2	(India) Ankita Raina	3	6	2

Final
6	(China) Han Xinyun	4	6	6
(China) Duan Yingying	6	2	2

=== Top half ===
First round
1	(China) L Zhu	6	6
Q	(China) J Kang	3	2
(China) X You	6	6
WC	(China) M Wang	4	1
(Hong Kong) L Zhang	6	1	3
Q	(United States) C Harrison	3	6	6
WC	(China) H Guo	1	2
5	(China) F Xun	6	6
3	(China) F Liu	6	7
(China) Xin Wang	3	5
(Japan) C Muramatsu	0	0
(Russia) V Savinykh	6	6
WC	(China) X Sun	3	1
Q	(New Zealand) P Hourigan	6	6
Q	(United States) A Nefedova	2	4
6	(China) X Han	6	6

Second round
1	(China) L Zhu	6	6
(China) X You	4	3
Q	(United States) C Harrison	6	2
5	(China) F Xun	4	1^{r}
3	(China) F Liu	4	6^{5}
(Russia) V Savinykh	6	7^{7}
Q	(New Zealand) P Hourigan	3	1
6	(China) X Han	6	6

Quarterfinals
1	(China) L Zhu	6	6
Q	(United States) C Harrison	1	1
(Russia) V Savinykh	5	6	2
6	(China) X Han	7	0	6

Semifinals
1	(China) L Zhu	4	4
6	(China) X Han	6	6

=== Bottom half ===
First round
7	(China) S Ma	6	6
(Japan) M Minokoshi	3	3
Q	(China) Y Ma	6	5	6
(China) Jin Lu	1	7	3
(Thailand) P Plipuech	7	6
(Japan) E Sema	5	2
(China) Y Duan	6^{4}	6	6
4	(China) S Xu	7^{7}	2	3
8	(China) Yu Zhang	6^{4}	6^{3}
Q	(China) Z Sun	7^{7}	7^{7}
Q	(Japan) A Omae	6	4	0
SE	(Hong Kong) E Chong	2	6	6
WC	(China) W Zhu	5	2
(China) Y Yuan	7	6
Q	(China) X Jiang	4	3
2	(India) A Raina	6	6

Second round
7	(China) S Ma	6	7^{7}
Q	(China) Y Ma	4	6^{1}
(Thailand) P Plipuech	2	2
(China) Y Duan	6	6
Q	(China) Z Sun	3	1
SE	(Hong Kong) E Chong	6	6
(China) Y Yuan	2	3
2	(India) A Raina	6	6

Quarterfinals
7	(China) S Ma	4	3
(China) Y Duan	6	6
SE	(Hong Kong) E Chong	6	4	5
2	(India) A Raina	2	6	7

Semifinals
(China) Y Duan	6	1	6
2	(India) A Raina	3	6	2
