= 2017 Jin'an Open – Women's singles =

Women's singles
- 2017 Jin'an Open

Final
- Champion: (China) Zhu Lin
- Runner-up: (India) Ankita Raina
- Score: 6–3, 3–6, 6–4

Events
Singles	men	women
Doubles	men	women
Jin'an Open	· 2018 →

This was the first edition of this event.

Zhu Lin won the title, defeating Ankita Raina in the final, 6–3, 3–6, 6–4.

== Seeds ==
1. (China) Zhu Lin (champion)
2. (China) Wang Yafan (first round)
3. (China) Liu Fangzhou (quarterfinals)
4. (United States) Jacqueline Cako (first round)
5. (Georgia (country)) Sofia Shapatava (semifinals)
6. (China) Lu Jingjing (second round)
7. (Serbia) Jovana Jakšić (quarterfinals)
8. (United States) Danielle Lao (semifinals; retired)

== Draw ==
=== Key ===
- Q = Qualifier
- WC = Wild card
- LL = Lucky loser
- Alt = Alternate
- SE = Special exempt
- PR = Protected ranking
- ITF = ITF entry
- JE = Junior exempt
- w/o = Walkover
- r = Retired
- d = Defaulted
- SR = Special ranking

=== Finals ===
Semifinals
1	(China) Zhu Lin	4	6	4
8	(United States) Danielle Lao	6	4	1^{r}
(India) Ankita Raina	6	6
5	(Georgia (country)) Sofia Shapatava	4	1

Final
1	(China) Zhu Lin	6	3	6
(India) Ankita Raina	3	6	4

=== Top half ===
First round
1	(China) L Zhu	6	6
Q	(China) Y Yuan	3	4
(China) X You	4	6	3
(China) J Kang	6	2	6
WC	(China) A Gai	6	7
(China) R Tian	2	5
Q	(United Kingdom) S Larkin	4	5
7	(Serbia) J Jakšić	6	7
4	(United States) J Cako	4	2
LL	(China) Q Ye	6	6
(China) H Guo	6	3	7^{7}
(China) F Xun	3	6	6^{4}
(China) X Sun	3	6	6
(China) Y Zhang	6	4	4
(Japan) M Ayukawa	5	2
8	(United States) D Lao	7	6

Second round
1	(China) L Zhu	6	7^{7}
(China) J Kang	3	6^{5}
WC	(China) A Gai	6	6^{4}	6^{2}
7	(Serbia) J Jakšić	0	7^{7}	7^{7}
LL	(China) Q Ye	5	4
(China) H Guo	7	6
(China) X Sun	2	6^{3}
8	(United States) D Lao	6	7^{7}

Quarterfinals
1	(China) L Zhu	4	6	6
7	(Serbia) J Jakšić	6	2	3
(China) H Guo	2	2
8	(United States) D Lao	6	6

Semifinals
1	(China) L Zhu	4	6	4
8	(United States) D Lao	6	4	1^{r}

=== Bottom half ===
First round
6	(China) J Lu	6	6
Q	(China) Q Tang	1	0
WC	(China) Z Wei	2	3
(India) A Raina	6	6
(Italy) G Gatto-Monticone	0	5
(Japan) E Sema	6	7
(Japan) Y Tanaka	2	1
3	(China) F Liu	6	6
5	(Georgia (country)) S Shapatava	6	7^{7}
(Montenegro) A Veselinović	1	6^{5}
Q	(China) W Zheng	6	2	4
(Chinese Taipei) C-w Hsu	1	6	6
WC	(China) J Ren	1	4
(China) C Liu	6	6
WC	(China) S Guo	6	6
2	(China) Y Wang	3	0

Second round
6	(China) J Lu	2	7	3
(India) A Raina	6	5	6
(Japan) E Sema	2	4
3	(China) F Liu	6	6
5	(Georgia (country)) S Shapatava	6	6
(Chinese Taipei) C-w Hsu	3	4
(China) C Liu	6	6
WC	(China) S Guo	1	4

Quarterfinals
(India) A Raina	4	6	6
3	(China) F Liu	6	3	2
5	(Georgia (country)) S Shapatava	1	6	6
(China) C Liu	6	4	3

Semifinals
(India) A Raina	6	6
5	(Georgia (country)) S Shapatava	4	1
