= 2019 Suzhou Ladies Open – Doubles =

Doubles
- 2019 Suzhou Ladies Open

Final
- Champions: (China) Jiang Xinyu (China) Tang Qianhui
- Runners-up: (India) Ankita Raina (Netherlands) Rosalie van der Hoek
- Score: 3–6, 6–3, [10–5]

Events
Singles	Doubles
← 2018 ·	Suzhou Ladies Open	· 2020 →

Misaki Doi and Nao Hibino were the defending champions, and chose not to participate.

== Seeds ==
1. (United Kingdom) Harriet Dart / (Russia) Valeria Savinykh (quarterfinals, withdrew)
2. (China) Jiang Xinyu / (China) Tang Qianhui (champions)
3. (India) Ankita Raina / (Netherlands) Rosalie van der Hoek (final)
4. (Georgia (country)) Sofia Shapatava / (United Kingdom) Emily Webley-Smith (first round)

== Draw ==
=== Key ===
- Q = Qualifier
- WC = Wild card
- LL = Lucky loser
- Alt = Alternate
- SE = Special exempt
- PR = Protected ranking
- ITF = ITF entry
- JE = Junior exempt
- w/o = Walkover
- r = Retired
- d = Defaulted
- SR = Special ranking

=== Draw ===
First round
1	(United Kingdom) H Dart (Russia) V Savinykh	6	6
(China) S Feng (China) F Xun	3	3
(Serbia) J Jakšić (Serbia) N Kostić	7^{8}	2	[10]
(South Korea) S-j Jang (Japan) H Kuwata	6^{6}	6	[3]
3	(India) A Raina (Netherlands) R van der Hoek	6	7
WC	(China) M Guo (China) W Zhu	2	5
(China) S Xu (China) X You	4	4
(Russia) K Laskutova (Cyprus) R Șerban	6	6
(China) J Kang (Thailand) P Plipuech	6	7^{7}
WC	(China) J Chen (China) M Wu	3	6^{1}
(China) Y Duan (China) Yi Zhang	3	6	[12]
4	(Georgia (country)) S Shapatava (United Kingdom) E Webley-Smith	6	1	[10]
(China) S Ma (Bulgaria) A Naydenova	3	5
(Indonesia) B Gumulya (Indonesia) J Rompies	6	7
WC	(China) Jia Lu (China) M Wang	4	2
2	(China) X Jiang (China) Q Tang	6	6

Quarterfinals
1	(United Kingdom) H Dart (Russia) V Savinykh
(Serbia) J Jakšić (Serbia) N Kostić	w/o
3	(India) A Raina (Netherlands) R van der Hoek	2	6	[15]
(Russia) K Laskutova (Cyprus) R Șerban	6	2	[13]
(China) J Kang (Thailand) P Plipuech	w/o
(China) Y Duan (China) Yi Zhang
(Indonesia) B Gumulya (Indonesia) J Rompies	5	6^{5}
2	(China) X Jiang (China) Q Tang	7	7^{7}

Semifinals
(Serbia) J Jakšić (Serbia) N Kostić	6	5	[8]
3	(India) A Raina (Netherlands) R van der Hoek	4	7	[10]
(China) J Kang (Thailand) P Plipuech	7^{7}	3	[1]
2	(China) X Jiang (China) Q Tang	6^{5}	6	[10]

Final
3	(India) A Raina (Netherlands) R van der Hoek	6	3	[5]
2	(China) X Jiang (China) Q Tang	3	6	[10]
