= 2017 Jin'an Open =

- Date: 22–28 May (women); 29 May–4 June (men)
- Edition: 2nd (men); 1st (women)
- Category: ITF Men's Circuit; ITF Women's Circuit
- Prize money: $25,000 (men) $60,000 (women)
- Surface: Hard
- Location: Lu'an, China

Champions

Men's singles
- (United States) Alexander Sarkissian

Women's singles
- (China) Zhu Lin

Men's doubles
- (Australia) Harry Bourchier / (Japan) Kaichi Uchida

Women's doubles
- (China) Jiang Xinyu / (China) Tang Qianhui
← 2016 ·	Jin'an Open	· 2018 →

The 2017 Jin'an Open was a professional tennis tournament played on outdoor hard courts. It was the first (women) and second (men) editions of the tournament and part of the 2017 ITF Women's Circuit and the 2017 ITF Men's Circuit, offering a total of $60,000 (women) and $25,000 (men) in prize money. It took place in Lu'an, China, from 22–28 May for women and 29 May–4 June for men.

== Point distribution ==
Event	W	F	SF	QF	Round of 16	Round of 32	Q	Q2	Q3
Singles	80	48	29	15	8	1	5	3	1
Doubles	80	48	29	15	1	—	—	—	—

== Women's singles main draw entrants ==
=== Seeds ===
Country	Player	Rank^{1}	Seed
CHN	Zhu Lin	124	1
CHN	Wang Yafan	131	2
CHN	Liu Fangzhou	138	3
USA	Jacqueline Cako	242	4
GEO	Sofia Shapatava	246	5
CHN	Lu Jingjing	253	6
SRB	Jovana Jakšić	282	7
USA	Danielle Lao	289	8

- ^{1} Rankings as of 15 May 2017

=== Other entrants ===
The following players received wildcards into the singles main draw:

- (China) Gai Ao
- (China) Guo Shanshan
- (China) Ren Jiaqi
- (China) Wei Zhanlan

The following players received entry from the qualifying draw:

- (United Kingdom) Suzy Larkin
- (China) Tang Qianhui
- (China) Yuan Yue
- (China) Zheng Wushuang

The following player received entry by a lucky loser:

- (China) Ye Qiuyu

== Men's singles main draw entrants ==
=== Seeds ===
Country	Player	Rank^{1}	Seed
CHN	Wu Di	217	1
CHN	Zhang Ze	232	2
USA	Alexander Sarkissian	331	3
USA	Marcos Giron	384	4
NZL	Finn Tearney	402	5
NZL	Jose Statham	407	6
TPE	Lee Kuan-yi	460	7
CHN	Bai Yan	483	8

- ^{1} Rankings as of 22 May 2017

=== Other entrants ===
The following players received wildcards into the singles main draw:

- (China) Hui Tianxiang
- (China) Wu Di
- (China) Zhang Ze
- (China) Zhang Zhizhen

The following players received entry from the qualifying draw:

- (China) Feng He
- (Chinese Taipei) Lin Wei-de
- (Chinese Taipei) Lo Chien-hsun
- (China) Qi Xi
- (New Zealand) Olly Sadler
- (Chinese Taipei) Tan Li-wie
- (China) Wang Chukang
- (China) Wu Hao

== Champions ==
=== Men's singles ===
- (United States) Alexander Sarkissian def. (China) Zhang Zhizhen, 6–2, 6–1

=== Women's singles ===
- (China) Zhu Lin def. (India) Ankita Raina, 6–3, 3–6, 6–4

=== Men's doubles ===
- (Australia) Harry Bourchier / (Japan) Kaichi Uchida def. (Chinese Taipei) Lo Chien-hsun / (China) Zhou Shenghao, 6–3, 7–5

=== Women's doubles ===
- (China) Jiang Xinyu / (China) Tang Qianhui def. (Japan) Mana Ayukawa / (Japan) Erika Sema, 7–5, 6–4
