= 2025 Suzhou WTA 125 – Doubles =

Doubles
- 2025 Suzhou WTA 125

Final
- Champions: (Indonesia) Aldila Sutjiadi (Indonesia) Janice Tjen
- Runners-up: (Poland) Katarzyna Kawa (Japan) Makoto Ninomiya
- Score: 6–4, 6–3

Events
| Singles | Doubles |
- Suzhou Ladies Open

Jiang Xinyu and Tang Qianhui were the reigning champions from when the tournament was last held in 2019, but Jiang did not participate. Tang partnered Varvara Lepchenko, but they withdrew from their first round match.

Aldila Sutjiadi and Janice Tjen won the title, defeating Katarzyna Kawa and Makoto Ninomiya in the final; 6–4, 6–3.

== Seeds ==
1. (Australia) Storm Hunter / (United States) Desirae Krawczyk (semifinals)
2. (Japan) Moyuka Uchijima / (China) Zheng Saisai (first round)
3. (Chinese Taipei) Cho I-hsuan / (Chinese Taipei) Cho Yi-tsen (first round)
4. (Indonesia) Aldila Sutjiadi / (Indonesia) Janice Tjen (champions)

== Draw ==
Key

- Q = Qualifier
- WC = Wild card
- LL = Lucky loser
- Alt = Alternate
- ITF = ITF entry
- PR = Protected ranking
- SR = Special ranking
- SE = Special exempt
- JE = Junior exempt
- JR = Junior Accelerator Programme entrant
- CO = College Accelerator Programme entrant
- NG = Next Gen Accelerator Program entrant
- w/o = Walkover
- r = Retired
- d = Defaulted

=== Draw ===
First round
1 | (Australia) S Hunter (United States) D Krawczyk | 6 | 6
(India) R Bhosale (India) A Raina | 1 | 1
(China) Z Li (China) Q Ye | 5 | 6 | [10]
WC | (China) H Shi (China) M Wang | 7 | 2 | [8]
3 | (Chinese Taipei) I-h Cho (Chinese Taipei) Y-t Cho | 4 | 3
(Poland) K Kawa (Japan) M Ninomiya | 6 | 6
(Thailand) P Plipuech (China) W Zheng | 2 | 7^{8} | [10]
(India) R Bhatia (Hong Kong) C Wong | 6 | 6^{6} | [3]
(United States) V Lepchenko (China) Q Tang
(Czech Republic) L Fruhvirtová (Switzerland) V Golubic | w/o
(Chinese Taipei) Y-y Li; E Pridankina | 2 | 4
4 | (Indonesia) A Sutjiadi (Indonesia) J Tjen | 6 | 6
(Netherlands) A Hartono (India) P Thombare | 6 | 6
(Hong Kong) E Chong (Chinese Taipei) E-s Liang | 2 | 1
(France) E Cascino (China) S Feng | 6 | 2 | [10]
2 | (Japan) M Uchijima (China) S Zheng | 1 | 6 | [8]

Quarterfinals
1 | (Australia) S Hunter (United States) D Krawczyk | 7^{7} | 6
(China) Z Li (China) Q Ye | 6^{5} | 4
(Poland) K Kawa (Japan) M Ninomiya | 6 | 6
(Thailand) P Plipuech (China) W Zheng | 2 | 2
(Czech Republic) L Fruhvirtová (Switzerland) V Golubic | 2 | 4
4 | (Indonesia) A Sutjiadi (Indonesia) J Tjen | 6 | 6
(Netherlands) A Hartono (India) P Thombare | 2 | 4
(France) E Cascino (China) S Feng | 6 | 6

Semifinals
1 | (Australia) S Hunter (United States) D Krawczyk | 5 | 3
(Poland) K Kawa (Japan) M Ninomiya | 7 | 6
4 | (Indonesia) A Sutjiadi (Indonesia) J Tjen | 7 | 6
(France) E Cascino (China) S Feng | 5 | 4

Final
(Poland) K Kawa (Japan) M Ninomiya | 4 | 3
4 | (Indonesia) A Sutjiadi (Indonesia) J Tjen | 6 | 6
