= 2025 Suzhou WTA 125 =

- Date: 29 September–4 October 2025
- Edition: 9th
- Category: WTA 125 tournaments
- Prize money: $115,000
- Surface: Hard
- Location: Suzhou, China

Champions

Singles
- (Switzerland) Viktorija Golubic

Doubles
- (Indonesia) Aldila Sutjiadi / (Indonesia) Janice Tjen
← 2019 ·	Suzhou Ladies Open	· 2026 →

The 2025 Suzhou WTA 125 was a professional tennis tournament played on outdoor hard courts. It was the ninth edition of the tournament (the first since 2019) and part of the 2025 WTA 125 tournaments (upgraded from ITF status in previous editions). It took place in Suzhou, China between 29 September and 4 October 2025.

== Singles main-draw entrants ==
=== Seeds ===
Country	Player	Rank^{1}	Seed
USA	Iva Jovic	37	1
GER	Tatjana Maria	44	2
NED	Suzan Lamens	57	3
PHI	Alexandra Eala	58	4
KAZ	Yulia Putintseva	63	5
SUI	Viktorija Golubic	70	6
ITA	Lucia Bronzetti	73	7
	~~Polina Kudermetova~~	~~76~~	~~8~~

- ^{1} Rankings are as of 22 September 2025.

=== Other entrants ===
The following players received wildcards into the singles main draw:

- (China) Shi Han
- (China) Yao Xinxin
- (China) Zheng Saisai
- (China) Zhu Chenting

The following player received entry as a special exempt:

- (New Zealand) Lulu Sun

The following players received entry from the qualifying draw:

- (United States) Caroline Dolehide
- (Czech Republic) Linda Fruhvirtová
- (United States) Varvara Lepchenko
- (Indonesia) Janice Tjen

The following players received entry as lucky losers:

- (Chinese Taipei) Joanna Garland
- ~~(Netherlands) Arianne Hartono~~
- (Australia) Maddison Inglis
- (Andorra) Victoria Jiménez Kasintseva
- (Japan) Kyōka Okamura

== Doubles entrants ==
=== Seeds ===
Country	Player	Country	Player	Rank	Seed
AUS	Storm Hunter	USA	Desirae Krawczyk	121	1
JPN	Moyuka Uchijima	CHN	Zheng Saisai	184	2
TPE	Cho I-hsuan	TPE	Cho Yi-tsen	222	3
INA	Aldila Sutjiadi	INA	Janice Tjen	237	4

- Rankings as of 22 September 2025.

=== Other entrants ===
The following pair received a wildcard into the doubles main draw:

- (China) Shi Han / (China) Wang Meiling

== Champions ==
=== Singles ===
- (Switzerland) Viktorija Golubic def. (United States) Katie Volynets 4–6, 6–4, 6–4

=== Doubles ===
- (Indonesia) Aldila Sutjiadi / (Indonesia) Janice Tjen def. (Poland) Katarzyna Kawa / (Japan) Makoto Ninomiya, 6–4, 6–3
