= 2017 Jin'an Open – Women's doubles =

Women's doubles
- 2017 Jin'an Open

Final
- Champion: (China) Jiang Xinyu (China) Tang Qianhui
- Runner-up: (Japan) Mana Ayukawa (Japan) Erika Sema
- Score: 7–5, 6–4

Events
Singles	men	women
Doubles	men	women
Jin'an Open	· 2018 →

This was the first edition of this event.

Jiang Xinyu and Tang Qianhui won the title, defeating Mana Ayukawa and Erika Sema in the final, 7–5, 6–4.

== Seeds ==
1. (China) Lu Jingjing / (China) You Xiaodi (quarterfinals)
2. (Australia) Alison Bai / (China) Wang Yan (first round)
3. (Chinese Taipei) Hsu Ching-wen / (China) Liu Chang (first round)
4. (China) Xun Fangying / (China) Zhang Ying (semifinals)

== Draw ==
=== Key ===
- Q = Qualifier
- WC = Wild card
- LL = Lucky loser
- Alt = Alternate
- SE = Special exempt
- PR = Protected ranking
- ITF = ITF entry
- JE = Junior exempt
- w/o = Walkover
- r = Retired
- d = Defaulted
- SR = Special ranking

First round
1	(China) J Lu (China) X You	7^{7}	6
(China) J Kang (China) Yu Zhang	6^{5}	4
(India) A Raina (United Kingdom) E Webley-Smith	1	4
(China) X Jiang (China) Q Tang	6	6
4	(China) F Xun (China) Yi Zhang	6	6
WC	(China) Yu Wang (China) W Zhu	1	2
WC	(China) R Meng (China) Y Yuan	6^{5}	6	[10]
(Serbia) J Jakšić (Montenegro) A Veselinović	7^{7}	3	[12]
(China) A Gai (China) H Guo	2	5
(Japan) M Ayukawa (Japan) E Sema	6	7
(China) J Chen (China) R Tian	6	1	[12]
3	(Chinese Taipei) C-w Hsu (China) C Liu	1	6	[10]
(China) X Sun (China) Q Ye	6	6
WC	(China) J Ren (China) Z Sun	2	0
(China) Z Wei (China) A Zhu	7	6
2	(Australia) A Bai (China) Ya Wang	5	2

Quarterfinals
1	(China) J Lu (China) X You	3	2
(China) X Jiang (China) Q Tang	6	6
4	(China) F Xun (China) Yi Zhang	5	6	[10]
(Serbia) J Jakšić (Montenegro) A Veselinović	7	2	[5]
(Japan) M Ayukawa (Japan) E Sema	7^{7}	7^{7}
(China) J Chen (China) R Tian	6^{3}	6^{3}
(China) X Sun (China) Q Ye	6	5	[12]
(China) Z Wei (China) A Zhu	4	7	[10]

Semifinals
(China) X Jiang (China) Q Tang	6	6
4	(China) F Xun (China) Yi Zhang	2	1
(Japan) M Ayukawa (Japan) E Sema	6	6
(China) X Sun (China) Q Ye	1	3

Final
(China) X Jiang (China) Q Tang	7	6
(Japan) M Ayukawa (Japan) E Sema	5	4
