= 2025 Suzhou WTA 125 – Singles =

Singles
- 2025 Suzhou WTA 125

Final
- Champion: (Switzerland) Viktorija Golubic
- Runner-up: (United States) Katie Volynets
- Score: 4–6, 6–4, 6–4

Details
- Draw: 32 (4Q / 4WC)
- Seeds: 8

Events
Singles	Doubles
- Suzhou Ladies Open

Viktorija Golubic won the title, defeating Katie Volynets in the final, 4–6, 6–4, 6–4. She saved two match points in the quarterfinals against Alexandra Eala.

Peng Shuai was the defending champion from 2019 when the tournament was held as an ITF W100 event, but retired from professional tennis in 2022.

== Seeds ==
1. (United States) Iva Jovic (first round)
2. (Germany) Tatjana Maria (semifinals)
3. (Netherlands) Suzan Lamens (second round)
4. (Philippines) Alexandra Eala (quarterfinals)
5. (Kazakhstan) Yulia Putintseva (quarterfinals, withdrew)
6. (Switzerland) Viktorija Golubic (champion)
7. (Italy) Lucia Bronzetti (first round)
8. Polina Kudermetova (withdrew)

== Draw ==
Key

- Q = Qualifier
- WC = Wild card
- LL = Lucky loser
- Alt = Alternate
- ITF = ITF entry
- PR = Protected ranking
- SR = Special ranking
- SE = Special exempt
- JE = Junior exempt
- JR = Junior Accelerator Programme entrant
- CO = College Accelerator Programme entrant
- NG = Next Gen Accelerator Program entrant
- w/o = Walkover
- r = Retired
- d = Defaulted

=== Finals ===
Semifinals
LL	(Andorra) Victoria Jiménez Kasintseva	5	2
(United States) Katie Volynets	7	6
6	(Switzerland) Viktorija Golubic	6	6
2	(Germany) Tatjana Maria	3	3

Final
(United States) Katie Volynets	6	4	4
6	(Switzerland) Viktorija Golubic	4	6	6

=== Top half ===
First round
1	(United States) I Jovic	4	6^{3}
SE	(New Zealand) L Sun	6	7^{7}
(Australia) T Gibson	6^{2}	5
LL	(Andorra) V Jiménez Kasintseva	7^{7}	7
Q	(United States) V Lepchenko	6	1	7^{7}
Q	(Indonesia) J Tjen	4	6	6^{2}
LL	(Japan) K Okamura	6	6
(Australia) K Birrell	2	4
3	(Netherlands) S Lamens	6	6
WC	(China) X Yao	2	3
(United States) K Volynets	6	6
WC	(China) C Zhu	0	3
Q	(United States) C Dolehide	4	6	7^{7}
(Japan) M Uchijima	6	4	6^{5}
LL	(Chinese Taipei) J Garland	6	7
7	(Italy) L Bronzetti	3	5

Second round
SE	(New Zealand) L Sun	6	4	2
LL	(Andorra) V Jiménez Kasintseva	2	6	6
Q	(United States) V Lepchenko	1	6^{2}
LL	(Japan) K Okamura	6	7^{7}
3	(Netherlands) S Lamens	5	1
(United States) K Volynets	7	6
Q	(United States) C Dolehide	6	6
LL	(Chinese Taipei) J Garland	4	4

Quarterfinals
LL	(Andorra) V Jiménez Kasintseva	6	6
LL	(Japan) K Okamura	3	1
(United States) K Volynets	3	6	7
Q	(United States) C Dolehide	6	2	5

Semifinals
LL	(Andorra) V Jiménez Kasintseva	5	2
(United States) K Volynets	7	6

=== Bottom half ===
First round
6	(Switzerland) V Golubic	6	6
(Switzerland) R Masarova	2	3
Q	(Czech Republic) L Fruhvirtová	2	6	6
A Zakharova	6	0	2
(Belgium) G Minnen	6	6
WC	(China) H Shi	4	0
(Poland) K Kawa	3	6	5
4	(Philippines) A Eala	6	3	7
5	(Kazakhstan) Y Putintseva	6	6^{4}	6
(France) D Parry	1	7^{7}	1
(Ukraine) Y Starodubtseva	2	2
(Hungary) D Gálfi	6	6
LL	(Australia) M Inglis	2	5
(France) L Jeanjean	6	7
WC	(China) S Zheng	3	2
2	(Germany) T Maria	6	6

Second round
6	(Switzerland) V Golubic	6	6
Q	(Czech Republic) L Fruhvirtová	2	0
(Belgium) G Minnen	6^{5}	7^{7}	5
4	(Philippines) A Eala	7^{7}	6^{3}	7
5	(Kazakhstan) Y Putintseva	3	6	7
(Hungary) D Gálfi	6	3	5
(France) L Jeanjean	2	4
2	(Germany) T Maria	6	6

Quarterfinals
6	(Switzerland) V Golubic	2	6	7^{7}
4	(Philippines) A Eala	6	2	6^{0}
5	(Kazakhstan) Y Putintseva
2	(Germany) T Maria	w/o

Semifinals
6	(Switzerland) V Golubic	6	6
2	(Germany) T Maria	3	3

== Qualifying ==
=== Seeds ===
1. (United States) Caroline Dolehide (qualified)
2. (Indonesia) Janice Tjen (qualified)
3. (Andorra) Victoria Jiménez Kasintseva (qualifying competition, lucky loser)
4. (Chinese Taipei) Joanna Garland (qualifying competition, lucky loser)
5. (United States) Whitney Osuigwe (first round, retired)
6. (Czech Republic) Linda Fruhvirtová (qualified)
7. (United States) Varvara Lepchenko (qualified)
8. (Australia) Maddison Inglis (first round, lucky loser)

=== Qualifiers ===
1. (United States) Caroline Dolehide
2. (Indonesia) Janice Tjen
3. (United States) Varvara Lepchenko
4. (Czech Republic) Linda Fruhvirtová

=== Lucky losers ===
1. (Netherlands) Arianne Hartono (withdrew)
2. (Japan) Kyōka Okamura
3. (Andorra) Victoria Jiménez Kasintseva
4. (Chinese Taipei) Joanna Garland
5. (Australia) Maddison Inglis

=== Qualifying draw ===
==== First qualifier ====
First round
1	(United States) Caroline Dolehide	6	6
(Australia) Destanee Aiava	3	3
(Netherlands) Arianne Hartono	4	7	4
5	(United States) Whitney Osuigwe	6	5	2^{r}

Qualifying competition
1	(United States) Caroline Dolehide	6	6
(Netherlands) Arianne Hartono	3	2

==== Second qualifier ====
First round
2	(Indonesia) Janice Tjen	6	6
WC	(China) Qu Yihan	2	1
(Japan) Kyōka Okamura	6	6
8	(Australia) Maddison Inglis	4	4

Qualifying competition
2	(Indonesia) Janice Tjen	7^{7}	6
(Japan) Kyōka Okamura	6^{3}	2

==== Third qualifier ====
First round
3	(Andorra) Victoria Jiménez Kasintseva	6	6
(Japan) Mai Hontama	3	2
Tatiana Prozorova	6^{9}	6	1
7	(United States) Varvara Lepchenko	7^{11}	4	6

Qualifying competition
3	(Andorra) Victoria Jiménez Kasintseva	6^{3}	3
7	(United States) Varvara Lepchenko	7^{7}	6

==== Fourth qualifier ====
First round
4	(Chinese Taipei) Joanna Garland	6	6
WC	(China) Zheng Wushuang	1	4
(United States) Clervie Ngounoue	1	3
6	(Czech Republic) Linda Fruhvirtová	6	6

Qualifying competition
4	(Chinese Taipei) Joanna Garland	6^{3}	2
6	(Czech Republic) Linda Fruhvirtová	7^{7}	6
