= Jin'an Open =

- 2024 Jin'an Open

Tournament information
- Event name: Lu'an
- Location: Lu'an, China
- Venue: Anhui Province Tennis Training Base Tennis Court
- Surface: Hard
ATP Tour
- Category: ITF Men's Circuit
- Draw: 32S / 64Q / 16D
- Prize money: $25,000
WTA Tour
- Category: ITF Women's Circuit
- Draw: 32S / 32Q / 16D
- Prize money: $60,000

The Jin'an Open is a tennis tournament held on outdoor hardcourts in Lu'an, China. It has been held since 2016 and is part of the ITF Men's Circuit and ITF Women's Circuit.

== Past finals ==
=== Men's singles ===
Year	Champion	Runner-up	Score
2024	(China) Sun Fajing	(China) Mo Yecong	6–3, 6–1
2020–23	Tournament cancelled due to the COVID-19 pandemic		
2019	(China) Sun Fajing	(China) Cui Jie	7–5, 6–4
2018	(Finland) Patrik Niklas-Salminen	(China) Sun Fajing	2–6, 6–4, 6–4
2017	(United States) Alexander Sarkissian	(China) Zhang Zhizhen	6–2, 6–1
2016	(Japan) Akira Santillan	(New Zealand) Finn Tearney	6–3, 1–6, 6–4

=== Women's singles ===
Year	Champion	Runner-up	Score
2026	(China) You Xiaodi	Sofya Lansere	6–4, 6–7^{(2–7)}, 6–4
2025	(Australia) Arina Rodionova	(Thailand) Lanlana Tararudee	6–3, 1–6, 6–3
2024	(China) Wang Meiling	(China) Yao Xinxin	7–5, 6–2
2020–23	Tournament cancelled due to the COVID-19 pandemic		
2019	(China) Han Xinyun	(China) Duan Yingying	4–6, 6–2, 6–2
2018	(China) Zhu Lin	(China) Liu Fangzhou	6–0, 6–2
2017	(China) Zhu Lin	(India) Ankita Raina	6–3, 3–6, 6–4

=== Men's doubles ===
Year	Champions	Runners-up	Score
2024	(New Zealand) Ajeet Rai (China) Sun Fajing	(China) Cui Jie (South Korea) Lee Duck-hee	6–2, 6–2
2020–23	Tournament cancelled due to the COVID-19 pandemic		
2019	(China) Wu Hao (China) Zeng Shihong	(China) Gao Qun (China) Yu Bingyu	7–6^{(8–6)}, 6–3
2018	(Finland) Harri Heliövaara (Finland) Patrik Niklas-Salminen	(China) Gao Xin (China) Te Rigele	6–2, 6–3
2017	(Australia) Harry Bourchier (Japan) Kaichi Uchida	(Chinese Taipei) Lo Chien-hsun (China) Zhou Shenghao	6–3, 7–5
2016	(China) Gao Xin (China) Ouyang Bowen	(Chinese Taipei) Peng Hsien-yin (China) Wang Chuhan	7–5, 6–3

=== Women's doubles ===
Year	Champions	Runners-up	Score
2026	Ekaterina Ovcharenko; Varvara Panshina	(Indonesia) Priska Madelyn Nugroho (Australia) Alexandra Osborne	6–2, 6–2
2025	(Indonesia) Priska Madelyn Nugroho (India) Ankita Raina	Kristina Dmitruk; Kira Pavlova	6–0, 6–3
2024	(China) Tang Qianhui (China) Zheng Wushuang	(Thailand) Luksika Kumkhum (Thailand) Peangtarn Plipuech	6–1, 6–2
2020–23	Tournament cancelled due to the COVID-19 pandemic		
2019	(Indonesia) Beatrice Gumulya (China) You Xiaodi	(Japan) Mai Minokoshi (Japan) Erika Sema	6–1, 7–5
2018	(United Kingdom) Harriet Dart (India) Ankita Raina	(China) Liu Fangzhou (China) Xun Fangying	6–3, 6–3
2017	(China) Jiang Xinyu (China) Tang Qianhui	(Japan) Mana Ayukawa (Japan) Erika Sema	7–5, 6–4
