= Beatrice Gumulya =

Indonesian tennis player

- Country (sports): Indonesia
- Residence: Jakarta, Indonesia
- Born: 1 January 1991 (age 35) Jakarta
- Height: 1.61 m (5 ft 3 in)
- Turned pro: 2003
- Plays: Right (two-handed backhand)
- Prize money: $101,957

Singles
- Career record: 123–143
- Career titles: 1 ITF
- Highest ranking: No. 564 (6 June 2016)

Doubles
- Career record: 218–197
- Career titles: 15 ITF
- Highest ranking: No. 138 (1 July 2019)

Team competitions
- BJK Cup: 11–14
Medal record
Women's Tennis
Representing Indonesia
Summer Universiade
Bronze medal – third place	2015 Gwangju	Singles
Asian Indoor and Martial Arts Games
Gold medal – first place	2017 Ashgabat	Singles
SEA Games
Gold medal – first place	2019 Philippines	Doubles
Gold medal – first place	2023 Cambodia	Team
Bronze medal – third place	2019 Philippines	Mixed doubles
Bronze medal – third place	2021 Vietnam	Doubles
Bronze medal – third place	2021 Vietnam	Team
Bronze medal – third place	2023 Cambodia	Doubles
Bronze medal – third place	2023 Cambodia	Mixed doubles

Beatrice Gumulya (born 1 January 1991) is an Indonesian inactive tennis player.

== Career ==
She is the younger sister of Sandy Gumulya and made her debut as a professional in 2005, aged 14, at an ITF tournament in Jakarta.

She enjoyed some success in Grand Slam junior championships. In 2008, she and partner Jessy Rompies reached the semifinals of the Junior US Open doubles competition. She also reached the semifinals in the 2009 Junior Australian Open doubles tournament, this time partnered by Noppawan Lertcheewakarn of Thailand. She enrolled in Clemson University in Fall 2011, studying PRTM and playing for the Clemson tennis team. In 2016, she represented Indonesia in the Fed Cup for the first time.

== ITF Circuit finals ==
=== Singles: 1 (title) ===
Legend $25,000 tournaments $10,000 tournaments (1–0)	Finals by surface Hard (1–0)

Result	W–L	Date	Tournament	Tier	Surface	Opponent	Score
Win	1–0	Aug 2008	ITF Jakarta, Indonesia	10,000	Hard	(Indonesia) Sandy Gumulya	6–1, 3–6, 6–2

=== Doubles: 23 (15 titles, 8 runner-ups) ===
Legend $100,000 tournaments (0–1) $80,000 tournaments (1–0) $60,000 tournaments (1–0) $25,000 tournaments (3–2) $10/15,000 tournaments (10–5)	Finals by surface Hard (15–8)

Result	W–L	Date	Tournament	Tier	Surface	Partner	Opponents	Score
Win	1–0	May 2008	ITF Bulungan, Indonesia	10,000	Hard	(Indonesia) Lutfiana-Aris Budiharto	(Indonesia) Lavinia Tananta (China) Hao Jie	7–5, 4–6, [11–9]
Win	2–0	May 2009	ITF Tarakan, Indonesia	10,000	Hard	(Indonesia) Jessy Rompies	(Japan) Yurina Koshino (Japan) Erika Sema	7–6^{(7–2)}, 6–3
Loss	2–1	May 2009	ITF Tanjung Selor, Indonesia	25,000	Hard	(Indonesia) Jessy Rompies	(Indonesia) Ayu-Fani Damayanti (Indonesia) Lavinia Tananta	1–6, 1–6
Loss	2–2	Jul 2009	ITF Jakarta, Indonesia	10,000	Hard	(Indonesia) Jessy Rompies	(Thailand) Nungnadda Wannasuk (Thailand) Varatchaya Wongteanchai	2–6, 7–6^{(7–5)}, [7–10]
Win	3–2	Aug 2009	ITF Solo, Indonesia	10,000	Hard	(Indonesia) Jessy Rompies	(Thailand) Kanyapat Narattana (Thailand) Nungnadda Wannasuk	6–2, 6–2
Loss	3–3	Aug 2009	ITF Nonthaburi, Thailand	10,000	Hard	(Indonesia) Lavinia Tananta	(Hong Kong) Yang Zi-jun (Hong Kong) Zhang Ling	4–6, 3–6
Win	4–3	Jul 2013	ITF Solo, Indonesia	10,000	Hard	(Indonesia) Jessy Rompies	(Indonesia) Aldila Sutjiadi (China) Zhu Aiwen	6–2, 6–4
Loss	4–4	Jul 2013	ITF Solo, Indonesia	10,000	Hard	(Indonesia) Jessy Rompies	(Indonesia) Ayu Fani Damayanti (Indonesia) Lavinia Tananta	6–4, 1–6, [5–10]
Loss	4–5	Jun 2014	ITF Tarakan, Indonesia	10,000	Hard	(Indonesia) Jessy Rompies	(Thailand) Varatchaya Wongteanchai (Thailand) Varunya Wongteanchai	7–5, 4–6, [9–11]
Loss	4–6	Jun 2014	ITF Solo, Indonesia	10,000	Hard	(Indonesia) Jessy Rompies	(Indonesia) Nadia Ravita (Indonesia) Aldila Sutjiadi	2–6, 6–7^{(3–7)}
Win	5–6	Sep 2015	ITF Solo, Indonesia	10,000	Hard	(Indonesia) Jessy Rompies	(Malaysia) Jawairiah Noordin (Indonesia) Vita Taher	6–3, 7–5
Win	6–6	Oct 2015	ITF Jakarta, Indonesia	10,000	Hard	(Indonesia) Jessy Rompies	(Japan) Haine Ogata (India) Dhruthi Tatachar Venugopal	6–4, 7–6^{(7–4)}
Win	7–6	Oct 2016	ITF Tarakan, Indonesia	10,000	Hard (i)	(Indonesia) Jessy Rompies	(India) Kanika Vaidya (China) Wang Danni	6–3, 6–1
Win	8–6	Oct 2016	ITF Jakarta, Indonesia	10,000	Hard	(Indonesia) Jessy Rompies	(Chinese Taipei) Chien Pei-ju (Japan) Tomoko Dokei	6–0, 6–2
Win	9–6	Dec 2016	ITF Pune, India	25,000	Hard	(Montenegro) Ana Veselinović	(Thailand) Kamonwan Buayam (United Kingdom) Katy Dunne	6–4, 6–3
Win	10–6	Jul 2017	ITF Hua Hin, Thailand	15,000	Hard	(Indonesia) Jessy Rompies	(Thailand) Nudnida Luangnam (Thailand) Varunya Wongteanchai	6–2, 6–1
Win	11–6	Aug 2017	ITF Nonthaburi, Thailand	15,000	Hard	(Indonesia) Jessy Rompies	(Thailand) Tamachan Momkoonthod (India) Pranjala Yadlapalli	6–0, 7–6^{(7–5)}
Win	12–6	Dec 2018	ITF Pune, India	25,000	Hard	(Montenegro) Ana Veselinović	(Canada) Sharon Fichman (Russia) Valeria Savinykh	7–6^{(7–4)}, 1–6, [11–9]
Win	13–6	May 2019	Jin'an Open, China	60,000	Hard	(China) You Xiaodi	(Japan) Mai Minokoshi (Japan) Erika Sema	6–1, 7–5
Win	14–6	May 2019	ITF Singapore	25,000	Hard	(Indonesia) Jessy Rompies	(Papua New Guinea) Abigail Tere-Apisah (India) Rutuja Bhosale	6–4, 0–6, [10–6]
Loss	14–7	Jun 2019	ITF Jakarta, Indonesia	25,000	Hard	(Indonesia) Jessy Rompies	(Japan) Junri Namigata (Japan) Haruka Kaji	2–6, 6–4, [7–10]
Win	15–7	Nov 2019	Tyler Pro Challenge, United States	80,000	Hard	(Indonesia) Jessy Rompies	(Chinese Taipei) Hsu Chieh-yu (Mexico) Marcela Zacarías	6–2, 6–3
Loss	15–8	Oct 2022	ITF Les Franqueses del Vallès, Spain	100,000	Hard	(Japan) Misaki Doi	(Spain) Aliona Bolsova (Spain) Rebeka Masarova	5–7, 6–1, [3–10]

== ITF Junior Circuit finals ==
=== Singles: 5 (1 title, 4 runner-ups) ===
Legend Category G2 (0–1) Category G3 Category G4 (1–3) Category G5	Finals by surface Hard (1–4)

Result	W–L	Date	Tournament	Tier	Surface	Opponent	Score
Loss	0–1	Nov 2006	ITF Surabaya, Indonesia	G4	Hard	(Indonesia) Mia Sacca	1–6, 6–7
Loss	0–2	Nov 2006	ITF Solo, Indonesia	G4	Hard	(Czech Republic) Monika Tumova	3–6, 1–6
Loss	0–3	Nov 2007	ITF Solo, Indonesia	G4	Hard	(Indonesia) Grace Sari Ysidora	4–6, 3–6
Loss	0–4	Mar 2008	ITF Jakarta, Indonesia	G2	Hard	(Indonesia) Jessy Rompies	4–6, 1–6
Win	1–4	Nov 2008	ITF Solo, Indonesia	G4	Hard	(India) Tanvi Shah	6–0, 7–5

=== Doubles: 17 (10 titles, 7 runner-ups) ===
Legend Category G1 (3–4) Category G2 (3–0) Category G3 (2–1) Category G4 (2–2) Category G5	Finals by surface Hard (9–5) Clay (0–1) Grass (1–1)

Result	W–L	Date	Tournament	Tier	Surface	Partner	Opponents	Score
Loss	0–1	Nov 2005	ITF Surabaya, Indonesia	G4	Hard	(Indonesia) Lutfiana-Aris Budiharto	(Indonesia) Jessy Rompies (Indonesia) Vivien Silfany-Tony	2–6, 2–6
Loss	0–2	Jun 2006	ITF Jakarta, Indonesia	G4	Hard	(Indonesia) Lutfiana-Aris Budiharto	(Japan) Misaki Doi (Japan) Tomoko Iyori	6–2, 3–6, 3–6
Win	1–2	Jun 2006	ITF Bandung, Indonesia	G4	Hard	(Indonesia) Lutfiana-Aris Budiharto	(Japan) Misaki Doi (Japan) Tomoko Iyori	0–6, 6–4, 7–6
Loss	1–3	Jan 2007	ITF Kolkata, India	G3	Clay	(Indonesia) Jessy Rompies	(Ukraine) Julia Golobodorodko (Ukraine) Anastasiya Vasyleva	6–1, 3–6, 4–6
Win	2–3	Jan 2007	ITF Chandigarh, India	G3	Hard	(Russia) Polina Dzyuba	(Russia) Olga Makhova (Russia) Nanuli Pipiya	6–3, 3–6, 6–3
Win	3–3	Nov 2007	ITF Solo, Indonesia	G4	Hard	(Indonesia) Grace Sari Ysidora	(Indonesia) Angelika Jogasuria (Indonesia) Angelina Jogasuria	6–4, 6–1
Win	4–3	Nov 2007	ITF Sarawak, Malaysia	G3	Hard	(Indonesia) Jessy Rompies	(Hungary) Tímea Babos (Hungary) Réka Luca Jani	7–5, 6–1
Loss	4–4	Mar 2008	ITF Sarawak, Malaysia	G1	Hard	(Indonesia) Jessy Rompies	(Ukraine) Lyudmyla Kichenok (Ukraine) Nadiia Kichenok	6–7, 4–6
Win	5–4	Mar 2008	ITF Jakarta, Indonesia	G2	Hard	(Indonesia) Jessy Rompies	(Ukraine) Lyudmyla Kichenok (Ukraine) Nadiia Kichenok	w/o
Loss	5–5	Jun 2008	ITF Roehampton, UK	G1	Grass	(Indonesia) Jessy Rompies	(United Kingdom) Jade Curtis (Thailand) Noppawan Lertcheewakarn	4–6, 1–6
Win	6–5	Jun 2008	ITF Halle/Westfalen, Germany	G2	Grass	(Hong Kong) Yang Zi-jun	(France) Amandine Hesse (France) Kristina Mladenovic	7–5, 3–6, [10–8]
Win	7–5	Sep 2008	ITF Lexington, United States	G1	Hard	(Indonesia) Jessy Rompies	(United States) Jacqueline Cako (United States) Courtney Dolehide	5–7, 6–3, [10–7]
Win	8–5	Nov 2008	Asia Oceania Closed, Balikpapan, Indonesia	B1	Hard	(Indonesia) Jessy Rompies	(Japan) Miyabi Inoue (Thailand) Noppawan Lertcheewakarn	7–5, 3–6, 7–6^{(7–5)}
Loss	8–6	Dec 2008	ITF Bradenton, United States	G1	Hard	(Thailand) Kanyapat Narattana	(Belarus) Anna Orlik (United Kingdom) Laura Robson	6–7, 3–6
Win	9–6	Jan 2009	ITF Melbourne, Australia	G1	Hard	(Thailand) Kanyapat Narattana	(Belarus) Anna Orlik (United Kingdom) Laura Robson	6–4, 7–5
Win	10–6	Mar 2009	ITF Jakarta, Indonesia	G2	Hard	(Thailand) Kanyapat Narattana	(China) Dong Xiaorong (China) Yang Zhaoxuan	7–5, 6–2
Loss	10–7	Mar 2009	ITF Manila, Philippines	G1	Hard	(Thailand) Kanyapat Narattana	(Chinese Taipei) Juan Ting-fei (China) Liu Min	7–6, 2–6, [8–10]

== National representation ==
=== Multi-sport event (individual) ===
Gumulya made her debut in multi-sport event at the 2015 Summer Universiade, she won the women's singles bronze medal.

==== Singles: 2 (gold medal, bronze medal) ====
Result	Date	Tournament	Surface	Opponent	Score
Bronze	Jul 2015	Summer Universiade, Gwangju	Hard	(Thailand) Luksika Kumkhum	6–0, 2–6, 3–6
Gold	Sep 2017	Asian Indoor and Martial Arts Games, Ashgabat	Hard	(Indonesia) Aldila Sutjiadi	6–3, 3–6, 6–3

==== Doubles: 3 (gold medal, 2 bronze medals) ====
Result	Date	Tournament	Surface	Partner	Opponents	Score
Gold	Dec 2019	SEA Games, Manila	Hard	(Indonesia) Jessy Rompies	(Thailand) Peangtarn Plipuech (Thailand) Tamarine Tanasugarn	6–3, 6–3
Bronze	May 2022	SEA Games, Bắc Ninh	Hard	(Indonesia) Jessy Rompies	(Thailand) Pimrada Jattavapornvanit (Thailand) Lanlana Tararudee	6–4, 2–6, [8–10]
Bronze	May 2023	SEA Games, Phnom Penh	Hard	(Indonesia) Fitriana Sabrina	(Thailand) Luksika Kumkhum (Thailand) Peangtarn Plipuech	1–6, 0–6

==== Mixed doubles: 2 (2 bronze medals) ====
Result	Date	Tournament	Surface	Partner	Opponents	Score
Bronze	Dec 2019	SEA Games, Manila	Hard	(Indonesia) David Agung Susanto	(Thailand) Sanchai Ratiwatana (Thailand) Tamarine Tanasugarn	6–4, 3–6, [3–10]
Bronze	May 2023	SEA Games, Phnom Penh	Hard	(Indonesia) David Agung Susanto	(Thailand) Pruchya Isaro (Thailand) Peangtarn Plipuech	0–6, 2–6
