= Liu Yanni =

Chinese tennis player

- Country (sports): China
- Born: 11 June 1999 (age 27)
- Plays: Right (two-handed backhand)
- Prize money: $38,354

Singles
- Career record: 100–143
- Career titles: 0
- Highest ranking: No. 685 (14 January 2019)

Doubles
- Career record: 34–71
- Career titles: 1 ITF
- Highest ranking: No. 527 (31 December 2018)
- Last updated on: 2 September 2026.

Liu Yanni (Chinese: 刘燕妮; pinyin: Liú Yànnī; Mandarin pronunciation: [ljǒʊ jɛ̂n ní]; born 11 June 1999) is an inactive Chinese tennis player.

She has a career-high doubles ranking of world No. 527, achieved on 31 December 2018.

Liu made her WTA Tour main-draw debut at the 2018 Jiangxi International in the doubles tournament, partnering Yuan Yue.
