= Tang Qianhui =

Chinese tennis player (born 2000)

Tang Qianhui 汤千慧
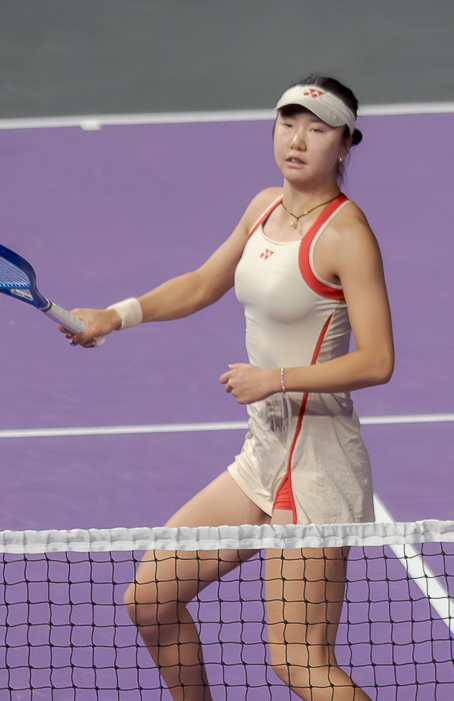
- Qianhui at the 2025 Transylvania Open
- Country (sports): China
- Residence: Chengdu, China
- Born: 10 September 2000 (age 26) Chengdu
- Plays: Right (two-handed backhand)
- Coach: Yu Liqiao
- Prize money: $547,016

Singles
- Career record: 86–90
- Highest ranking: No. 617 (24 June 2019)

Doubles
- Career record: 226–159
- Career titles: 3
- Highest ranking: No. 48 (12 October 2026)
- Current ranking: No. 48 (12 October 2026)

Grand Slam doubles results
- Australian Open: 1R (2018, 2025, 2026)
- French Open: 2R (2025, 2026)
- Wimbledon: 1R (2025, 2026)
- US Open: 2R (2026)
Medal record
tennis
Representing China
World University Games
Silver medal – second place	2021 Chengdu	Mixed
Silver medal – second place	2021 Chengdu	Team
- Last updated on: 16 October 2026.

Tang Qianhui (Chinese: 汤千惠; pinyin: Tāng Qiānhuì; Mandarin pronunciation: [tʰáŋ tɕʰjɛ́n xwêɪ]; born 10 September 2000) is a Chinese tennis player. She has a career-high singles ranking of world No. 617, achieved on 24 June 2019. She peaked at No. 48 in the WTA doubles rankings on 12 October 2026. Tang has won three doubles titles on the WTA Tour and two on the WTA Challenger Tour.

== Career ==
She won her biggest title to date at the 2017 Jiangxi International Open in Nanchang, partnering with Jiang Xinyu. The pair defended their title the following year.

She won her third title at the 2023 Hong Kong Open in the doubles competition with WTA Tour debutante Tsao Chia-yi.

She reached the top 100 in the doubles rankings on 24 June 2024.

== WTA Tour finals ==
=== Doubles: 6 (3 titles, 3 runner-ups) ===
Legend Premier / WTA 500 (0–1) International / WTA 250 (3–2)	Finals by surface Hard (3–2) Clay (0–1)

Result	W–L	Date	Tournament	Tier	Surface	Partner	Opponent	Score
Win	1–0	Jul 2017	Jiangxi Open, China	International	Hard	(China) Jiang Xinyu	(Russia) Alla Kudryavtseva (Australia) Arina Rodionova	6–3, 6–2
Win	2–0	Jul 2018	Jiangxi Open, China (2)	International	Hard	(China) Jiang Xinyu	(China) Lu Jingjing (China) You Xiaodi	6–4, 6–4
Win	3–0	Oct 2023	Hong Kong Open, China SAR	WTA 250	Hard	(Chinese Taipei) Tsao Chia-yi	(Georgia (country)) Oksana Kalashnikova; Aliaksandra Sasnovich	7–5, 1–6, [11–9]
Loss	3–1	Apr 2026	Open de Rouen, France	WTA 250	Clay (i)	(Chinese Taipei) Liang En-shuo	(Czech Republic) Jesika Malečková (Czech Republic) Miriam Škoch	2–6, 5–7
Loss	3–2	Jul 2026	Athens Open, Greece	WTA 250	Hard	(United Kingdom) Maia Lumsden	(Chinese Taipei) Chan Hao-ching (Japan) Miyu Kato	6–7^{(3)}, 6–4, [7–10]
Loss	3–3	Sep 2026	Singapore Open, Singapore	WTA 500	Hard	(China) Xu Yifan	(New Zealand) Erin Routliffe (Indonesia) Aldila Sutjiadi	3–6, 2–6

== WTA 125 finals ==
=== Doubles: 3 (2 titles, 1 runner-up) ===
Result	W–L	Date	Tournament	Surface	Partner	Opponents	Score
Loss	0–1	May 2025	Parma Open, Italy	Clay	(United States) Sabrina Santamaria	(Czech Republic) Jesika Malečková (Czech Republic) Miriam Škoch	2–6, 0–6
Win	1–1	Feb 2026	Midland Classic, United States	Hard (i)	(United States) Sabrina Santamaria	(United States) Alana Smith (United States) Mary Stoiana	walkover
Win	2–1	Apr 2026	Catalonia Open, Spain	Clay	Elena Pridankina	(Slovakia) Tereza Mihalíková (United Kingdom) Olivia Nicholls	6–1, 6–3

== ITF Circuit finals ==
=== Singles: 1 (runner-up) ===
Legend
W15 tournaments (0–1)

Result	W–L	Date	Tournament	Tier	Surface	Opponent	Score
Loss	0–1	Aug 2024	ITF Xiamen, China	W15	Hard	(Indonesia) Priska Madelyn Nugroho	6–2, 4–6, 0–6

=== Doubles: 30 (17 titles, 13 runner-ups) ===
Legend W100 tournaments (3–1) W60/75 tournaments (5–1) W40 tournaments (1–0) W25 tournaments (8–6) W10/15 tournaments (0–5)	Finals by surface Hard (16–9) Clay (1–3) Grass (0–1)

Result	No.	Date	Tournament	Tier	Surface	Partner	Opponents	Score
Loss	0–1	Mar 2015	ITF Jiangmen, China	10,000	Hard	(China) Jiang Xinyu	(Chinese Taipei) Hsu Ching-wen (China) Tang Haochen	4–6, 3–6
Loss	0–2	Jun 2015	ITF Anning, China	10,000	Clay	(China) Li Yihong	(China) Gao Xinyu (China) Zhang Ying	4–6, 2–6
Win	1–2	Jul 2016	ITF Yuxi, China	25,000	Hard	(China) Jiang Xinyu	(China) Gai Ao (China) Guo Shanshan	6–2, 3–6, [10–5]
Loss	1–3	Jul 2016	ITF Qujing, China	25,000	Hard	(China) Jiang Xinyu	(Japan) Akiko Omae (Thailand) Peangtarn Plipuech	3–6, 3–6
Win	2–3	May 2017	ITF Yuxi, China	25,000	Hard	(China) Jiang Xinyu	(China) Gai Ao (China) Kang Jiaqi	6–2, 7–5
Win	3–3	May 2017	ITF Qujing, China	25,000	Hard	(China) Jiang Xinyu	(China) Feng Shuo (China) Zhao Xiaoxi	6–4, 6–3
Win	4–3	May 2017	Jin'an Open, China	60,000	Hard	(China) Jiang Xinyu	(Japan) Mana Ayukawa (Japan) Erika Sema	7–5, 6–4
Loss	4–4	Jun 2017	ITF Wuhan, China	25,000	Hard	(China) Jiang Xinyu	(Australia) Alison Bai (China) Lu Jiajing	2–6, 6–7^{(3)}
Loss	4–5	Jul 2017	ITF Anning, China	15,000	Clay	(China) Jiang Xinyu	(China) Feng Shuo (China) Li Yihong	3–6, 4–6
Win	5–5	Jul 2017	ITF Tianjin, China	25,000	Hard	(China) Jiang Xinyu	(China) Liu Chang (China) Lu Jiajing	6–4, 6–1
Loss	5–6	Sep 2017	ITF Guiyang, China	25,000	Hard	(China) Jiang Xinyu	(Belarus) Lidziya Marozava (Uzbekistan) Sabina Sharipova	2–6, 3–6
Loss	5–7	Jul 2018	ITF Naiman, China	25,000	Hard	(China) Jiang Xinyu	(China) Kang Jiaqi (South Korea) Kim Na-ri	7–6^{(4)}, 4–6, [5–10]
Loss	5–8	Mar 2019	ITF Nanchang, China	W15	Clay (i)	(China) Guo Hanyu	(China) Cao Siqi (China) Guo Meiqi	4–6, 6–4, [8–10]
Loss	5–9	Mar 2019	ITF Xiamen, China	W15	Hard	(China) Zhang Ying	(China) Sun Xuliu (China) Zhao Qianqian	4–6, 4–6
Win	6–9	Jul 2019	ITF Tianjin, China	W25	Hard	(China) Jiang Xinyu	(China) Wu Meixu (China) Zheng Wushuang	7–5, 6–2
Win	7–9	Aug 2019	ITF Guiyang, China	W25	Hard	(China) Jiang Xinyu	(Hong Kong) Eudice Chong (Indonesia) Aldila Sutjiadi	7–5, 7–5
Win	8–9	Sep 2019	Changsha Open, China	W60	Clay	(China) Jiang Xinyu	(India) Rutuja Bhosale (Japan) Erika Sema	6–3, 3–6, [11–9]
Win	9–9	Oct 2019	Suzhou Ladies Open, China	W100	Hard	(China) Jiang Xinyu	(India) Ankita Raina (Netherlands) Rosalie van der Hoek	3–6, 6–3, [10–5]
Win	10–9	Nov 2019	Liuzhou Open, China	W60	Hard	(China) Jiang Xinyu	(India) Ankita Raina (Netherlands) Rosalie van der Hoek	6–4, 6–4
Loss	10–10	May 2023	Incheon Open, South Korea	W25	Hard	(Chinese Taipei) Li Yu-yun	(South Korea) Choi Ji-hee (South Korea) Ku Yeon-woo	1–6, 1–6
Loss	10–11	May 2023	ITF Goyang, South Korea	W25	Hard	(China) Guo Hanyu	(Thailand) Punnin Kovapitukted (Thailand) Luksika Kumkhum	3–6, 6–1, [6–10]
Win	11–11	Jun 2023	ITF Luzhou, China	W25	Hard	(Chinese Taipei) Li Yu-yun	(China) Feng Shuo (China) Zheng Wushuang	7–6^{(4)}, 6–2
Win	12–11	Sep 2023	ITF Nakhon Si Thammarat, Thailand	W25	Hard	(Thailand) Punnin Kovapitukted	(Japan) Naho Sato (Japan) Misaki Matsuda	7–6^{(1)}, 1–6, [10–3]
Win	13–11	Dec 2023	ITF Yokohama, Japan	W40	Hard	(Chinese Taipei) Liang En-shuo	(Japan) Aoi Ito (Japan) Natsumi Kawaguchi	w/o
Win	14–11	Feb 2024	Burnie International, Australia	W75	Hard	(China) You Xiaodi	(China) Ma Yexin (Australia) Alana Parnaby	6–4, 7–5
Loss	14–12	Mar 2024	Trnava Indoor, Slovakia	W75	Hard (i)	(Chinese Taipei) Liang En-shuo	(Netherlands) Isabelle Haverlag (United States) Anna Rogers	3–6, 6–4, [10–12]
Win	15–12	May 2024	Kangaroo Cup, Japan	W100	Hard	(Chinese Taipei) Liang En-shuo	(Australia) Kimberly Birrell (Canada) Rebecca Marino	6–0, 6–3
Win	16–12	May 2024	Jin'an Open, China	W75	Hard	(China) Zheng Wushuang	(Thailand) Luksika Kumkhum (Thailand) Peangtarn Plipuech	6–1, 6–2
Loss	16–13	Jun 2024	Ilkley Trophy, United Kingdom	W100	Grass	(United States) Quinn Gleason	(France) Kristina Mladenovic (Romania) Elena-Gabriela Ruse	2–6, 2–6
Win	17–13	Sep 2024	Incheon Open, South Korea	W100	Hard	(China) Zheng Wushuang	(China) Feng Shuo (Japan) Aoi Ito	6–2, 6–3
