= Liu Fangzhou =

Chinese tennis player

Liu Fangzhou 刘方舟
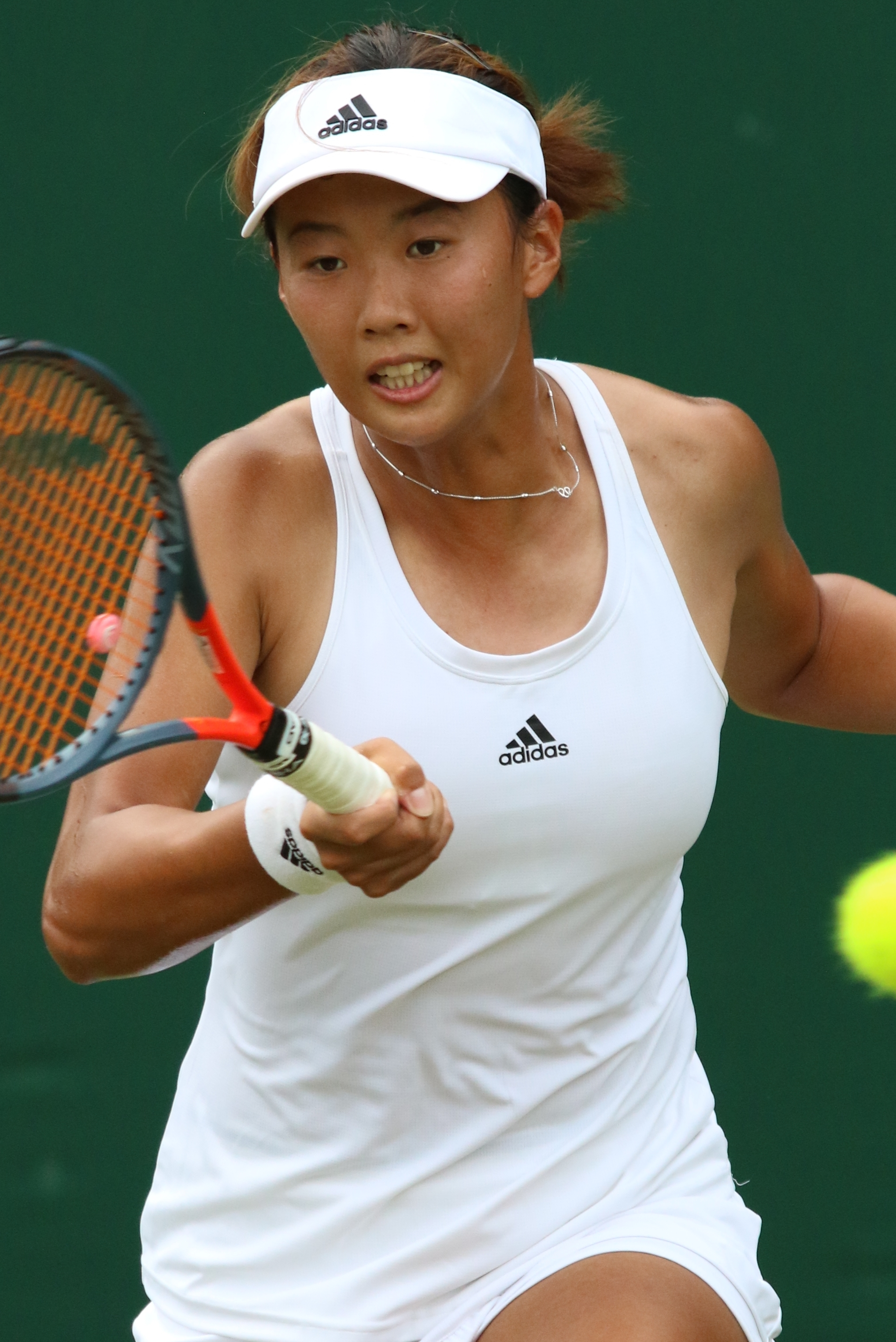
- Liu at the 2019 Wimbledon Championships
- Country (sports): China
- Residence: Tianjin, China
- Born: 12 December 1995 (age 30) Tianjin
- Height: 5 ft 11 in (180 cm)
- Turned pro: 2012
- Retired: Nov 2025
- Plays: Right (two-handed backhand)
- Prize money: $532,421

Singles
- Career record: 362–226
- Career titles: 6 ITF
- Highest ranking: No. 127 (24 April 2017)

Grand Slam singles results
- Australian Open: Q3 (2015)
- French Open: Q1 (2015)
- Wimbledon: Q3 (2015)
- US Open: Q2 (2018)

Doubles
- Career record: 79–82
- Career titles: 4 ITF
- Highest ranking: No. 429 (16 September 2024)

Grand Slam doubles results
- Wimbledon: Q1 (2017)

Liu Fangzhou (Chinese: 刘方舟; pinyin: Liú Fāngzhōu; Mandarin pronunciation: [ljǒʊ fáŋ ʈʂóʊ]; born 12 December 1995) is a former Chinese professional tennis player.

On 24 April 2017, she reached her best singles ranking of world No. 127. On 16 September 2024, she peaked at No. 429 in the WTA doubles rankings.

Playing for the China Fed Cup team, Liu has a win–loss record of 1–3.

== Career ==
Liu made her WTA Tour debut at the 2014 Shenzhen Open, having been awarded a wildcard into the main draw, but lost to Peng Shuai in the first round. She also made her debut in doubles, partnering You Xiaodi. The pair lost their first-round match against Monica Niculescu and Klára Zakopalová, who went on to win the tournament.

Six months later, Liu advanced to the final of the inaugural WTA 125 Jiangxi International Open where she again faced Peng, this time losing in a tough three-set match.

Liu retired from professional tennis in November 2025.

== WTA 125 finals ==
=== Singles: 1 (runner-up) ===
Result	W–L	Date	Tournament	Surface	Opponent	Score
Loss	0–1	Jul 2014	Jiangxi Open, China	Hard	(China) Peng Shuai	2–6, 6–3, 3–6

== ITF Circuit finals ==
=== Singles: 27 (6 titles, 21 runner-ups) ===
Legend W100 tournaments W50/60 tournaments W25/35 tournaments W10/15 tournaments	Finals by surface Hard (6–21)

Result	W–L	Date	Tournament	Tier	Surface	Opponent	Score
Loss	0–1	Mar 2012	Kōfu International, Japan	10,000	Hard	(Japan) Hiroko Kuwata	4–6, 6–4, 6–7^{(7)}
Loss	0–2	May 2013	ITF Goyang, South Korea	25,000	Hard	(China) Duan Yingying	3–6, 4–6
Loss	0–3	Feb 2014	ITF Nonthaburi, Thailand	10,000	Hard	(Hong Kong) Zhang Ling	3–6, 3–6
Loss	0–4	Mar 2014	ITF Shenzhen, China	10,000	Hard	(Chinese Taipei) Chan Chin-wei	6–2, 3–6, 3–6
Win	1–4	Nov 2014	Bendigo International, Australia	50,000	Hard	(Japan) Risa Ozaki	6–4, 6–3
Win	2–4	Mar 2016	ITF Nanjing, China	10,000	Hard	(China) Tian Ran	6–3, 6–2
Loss	2–5	Mar 2016	Blossom Cup, China	50,000	Hard	(China) Wang Qiang	2–6, 2–6
Loss	2–6	Apr 2016	ITF Nanning, China	25,000	Hard	(China) Zhang Kailin	3–6, 4–6
Loss	2–7	Jul 2016	ITF Qujing, China	25,000	Hard	(Uzbekistan) Nigina Abduraimova	5–7, 3–6
Loss	2–8	Aug 2016	ITF Naiman, China	25,000	Hard (i)	(China) Han Xinyun	4–6, 3–6
Loss	2–9	Apr 2017	Blossom Cup, China	60,000	Hard	(China) Zheng Saisai	2–6, 3–6
Loss	2–10	Jun 2017	ITF Wuhan, China	25,000	Hard	(Serbia) Jovana Jakšić	0–6, 6–3, 2–6
Loss	2–11	Nov 2017	Shenzhen Longhua Open, China	100,000	Hard	(Canada) Carol Zhao	5–7, 2–6
Loss	2–12	Apr 2018	Blossom Cup, China	60,000	Hard	(China) Zheng Saisai	3–6, 1–6
Loss	2–13	May 2018	Jin'an Open, China	60,000	Hard	(China) Zhu Lin	0–6, 2–6
Win	3–13	Jul 2018	ITF Tianjin, China	25,000	Hard	(China) Lu Jingjing	3–6, 6–3, 6–3
Loss	3–14	Mar 2019	Pingshan Open, China	W60	Hard	(Denmark) Clara Tauson	4–6, 3–6
Loss	3–15	Mar 2022	ITF Sharm El Sheikh, Egypt	W15	Hard	Mariia Tkacheva	4–6, 2–6
Win	4–15	Apr 2022	ITF Sharm El Sheikh, Egypt	W15	Hard	(China) Yang Yidi	6–2, 7–6^{(5)}
Win	5–15	May 2022	ITF Monastir, Tunisia	W15	Hard	(Japan) Ayumi Koshiishi	6–4, 7–5
Loss	5–16	Feb 2023	ITF Monastir, Tunisia	W15	Hard	(Serbia) Dejana Radanović	7–6^{(5)}, 3–6, 2–6
Win	6–16	Mar 2023	ITF Monastir, Tunisia	W15	Hard	(Italy) Martina Spigarelli	6–2, 6–3
Loss	6–17	Sep 2023	ITF Guiyang, China	W25	Hard	(China) Guo Hanyu	5–7, 6–2, 4–6
Loss	6–18	Jul 2024	ITF Tianjin, China	W35	Hard	(United States) Hina Inoue	4–6, 3–6
Loss	6–19	Jul 2024	ITF Naiman, China	W35	Hard	(China) Li Zongyu	6–4, 2–6, 4–6
Loss	6–20	May 2025	ITF Maanshan, China	W15	Hard (i)	(China) Guo Meiqi	3–5 ret.
Loss	6–21	Jun 2025	ITF Luzhou, China	W35	Hard	(Indonesia) Janice Tjen	0–6, 4–6

=== Doubles: 8 (4 titles, 4 runner-ups) ===
Legend W50 tournaments W25/35 tournaments W15 tournaments	Finals by surface Hard (4–4)

Result	W–L	Date	Tournament	Tier	Surface	Partner	Opponents	Score
Loss	0–1	Oct 2016	Brisbane QTC International, Australia	W25	Hard	(Israel) Julia Glushko	(Australia) Naiktha Bains (Papua New Guinea) Abigail Tere-Apisah	7–6^{(4)}, 2–6, [3–10]
Win	1–1	May 2022	ITF Monastir, Tunisia	W25	Hard	(Japan) Erika Sema	(Uzbekistan) Nigina Abduraimova (Russia) Aleksandra Pospelova	6–3, 6–2
Loss	1–2	May 2022	ITF Monastir, Tunisia	W15	Hard	(China) Wang Meiling	(United Kingdom) Kristina Paskauskas (China) Wei Sijia	6–3, 7–6^{(4)}
Loss	1–3	Jun 2022	ITF Chiang Rai, Thailand	W15	Hard	(China) Xun Fangying	(Japan) Anri Nagata (Japan) Naho Sato	2–6, 4–6
Win	2–3	Feb 2023	ITF Monastir, Tunisia	W15	Hard	(Chinese Taipei) Lee Ya-hsin	(Chile) Fernanda Labraña (Serbia) Elena Milovanović	6–3, 7–6^{(12)}
Win	3–3	Mar 2023	ITF Monastir, Tunisia	W15	Hard	(Japan) Naho Sato	(Greece) Eleni Christofi (United States) Paris Corley	6–4, 6–1
Win	4–3	Feb 2024	ITF Traralgon, Australia	W35	Hard	(Japan) Mana Kawamura	(Japan) Sayaka Ishii (Thailand) Lanlana Tararudee	6–7^{(4)}, 6–3, [13–11]
Loss	4–4	Aug 2024	Jinan Open, China	W50	Hard	(China) Feng Shuo	(China) Guo Meiqi (China) Xiao Zhenghua	3–6, 6–1, [5–10]

== Fed Cup participation ==
=== Singles (1–2) ===
Edition	Stage	Date	Location	Against	Surface	Opponent	W/L	Score
2014	Z1 R/R	5 February 2014	Astana, Kazakhstan	Uzbekistan	Hard (i)	(Uzbekistan) Sabina Sharipova	L	4–6, 2–6
2014	Z1 R/R	6 February 2014	Astana, Kazakhstan	South Korea	Hard (i)	(South Korea) Han Na-lae	W	6–3, 4–6, 6–4
2014	Z1 P/O	8 February 2014	Astana, Kazakhstan	Kazakhstan	Hard (i)	(Kazakhstan) Sesil Karatantcheva	L	6–4, 1–6, 1–6

=== Doubles (0–1) ===
Edition	Stage	Date	Location	Against	Surface	Partner	Opponents	W/L	Score
2014	Z1 R/R	5 Feb 2014	Astana, Kazakhstan	Uzbekistan	Hard (i)	(China) Zhang Shuai	(Uzbekistan) Nigina Abduraimova (Uzbekistan) Sabina Sharipova	L	1–6, 4–6
