= Xun Fangying =

Chinese tennis player

Xun Fangying 荀芳颖
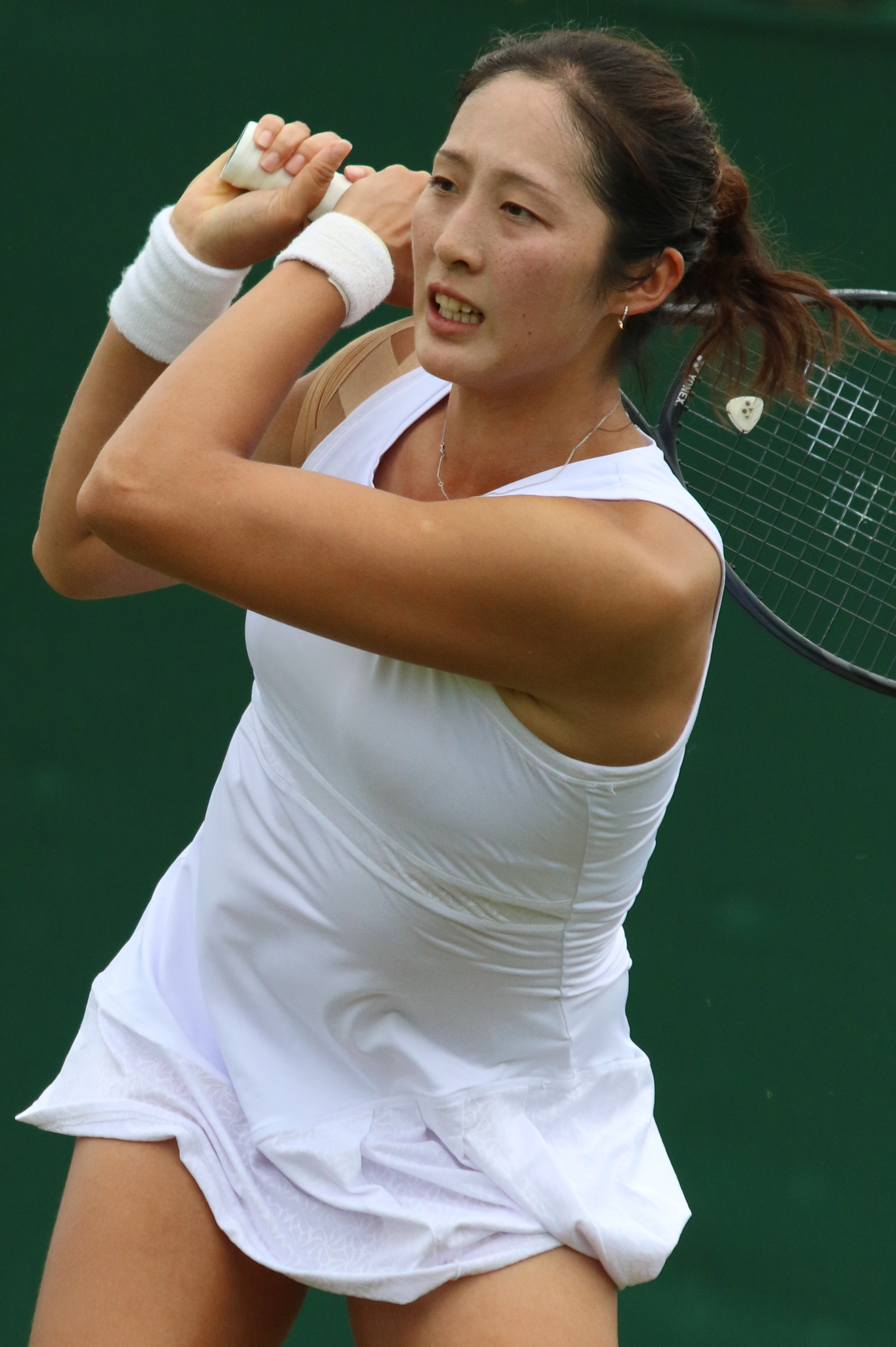
- Xun at the 2019 Wimbledon qualifying
- Country (sports): China
- Born: 14 January 1995 (age 31) Beijing
- Height: 1.86 m (6 ft 1 in)
- Plays: Right (two-handed backhand)
- Prize money: $313,757

Singles
- Career record: 302–266
- Career titles: 7 ITF
- Highest ranking: No. 167 (24 February 2020)

Grand Slam singles results
- Australian Open: Q2 (2020)
- French Open: Q1 (2021)
- Wimbledon: Q1 (2019, 2021)

Doubles
- Career record: 210–212
- Career titles: 9 ITF
- Highest ranking: No. 176 (8 April 2019)

Xun Fangying (Chinese: 荀芳颖; pinyin: Xún Fāngyǐng; Mandarin pronunciation: [ɕy̌n fáŋ ìŋ]; born 14 January 1995) is an inactive Chinese tennis player.

On 24 February 2020, she reached her career-high singles ranking of world No. 167. On 8 April 2019, she peaked at No. 176 in the WTA doubles rankings.

Xun made her WTA Tour main-draw debut at the 2015 Guangzhou International Open in the doubles competition, partnering Liu Fangzhou.

Her last appearance on the pro tour was in September 2025 in Jingshan, China where she lost her first-round match in qualifying.

== Performance timeline ==
Key
W	F	SF	QF	#R	RR	Q#	DNQ	A	NH

(W) winner; (F) finalist; (SF) semifinalist; (QF) quarterfinalist; (#R) rounds 4, 3, 2, 1; (RR) round-robin stage; (Q#) qualification round; (DNQ) did not qualify; (A) absent; (NH) not held; (SR) strike rate (events won / competed); (W–L) win–loss record.
To avoid confusion and double counting, these charts are updated at the conclusion of a tournament or when the player's participation has ended.

Only main-draw results in WTA Tour, Grand Slam tournaments, Fed Cup/Billie Jean King Cup and Olympic Games are included in win–loss records.

=== Singles ===
Tournament	2017	2018	2019	2020	2021	SR	W–L
Grand Slam tournaments
Australian Open	A	A	Q1	Q2	A	0 / 0	0–0
French Open	A	A	A	A	Q1	0 / 0	0–0
Wimbledon	A	A	Q1	NH	Q1	0 / 0	0–0
US Open	A	A	A	A	A	0 / 0	0–0
Win–Loss	0–0	0–0	0–0	0–0	0–0	0 / 0	0–0
WTA 1000
Wuhan Open	A	Q1	Q1	A	A	0 / 0	0–0
China Open	Q1	Q1	Q1	A	A	0 / 0	0–0
Career statistics
Year-end ranking	293	207	224	188	274	$254,850	

== ITF Circuit finals ==
=== Singles: 14 (7 titles, 7 runner-ups) ===
Legend $60,000 tournaments $25,000 tournaments $10/15,000 tournaments	Finals by surface Hard (6–7) Clay (1–0)

Result	W–L	Date	Tournament	Tier	Surface	Opponent	Score
Win	1–0	Feb 2014	ITF Nonthaburi, Thailand	10,000	Hard	(Japan) Yuuki Tanaka	7–6^{(2)}, 6–2
Win	2–0	May 2014	ITF Bangkok, Thailand	10,000	Hard	(Norway) Emma Flood	6–3, 6–4
Loss	2–1	Oct 2014	ITF Phuket, Thailand	15,000	Hard (i)	(France) Irina Ramialison	4–6, 7–5, 4–6
Win	3–1	Jun 2016	ITF Anning, China	10,000	Clay	(China) Kang Jiaqi	6–3, 6–1
Win	4–1	Feb 2017	ITF Nanjing, China	10,000	Hard	(Japan) Ayaka Okuno	6–4, 6–4
Loss	4–2	May 2017	ITF Yuxi, China	25,000	Hard	(China) Gao Xinyu	1–6, 4–6
Win	5–2	Mar 2018	ITF Nanjing, China	15,000	Hard	(China) Ye Qiuyu	6–1, 6–1
Win	6–2	Apr 2018	ITF Nanjing, China	15,000	Hard	(China) Han Xinyun	6–4, 6–3
Loss	6–3	Jul 2018	ITF Naiman, China	25,000	Hard	(China) Zhang Yuxuan	3–6, 2–6
Loss	6–4	Jun 2019	ITF Luzhou, Japan	W25	Hard	(China) Guo Hanyu	2–6, 1–6
Loss	6–5	Jun 2019	ITF Shenzhen, China	W25	Hard	(China) Wang Xinyu	1–6, 0–6
Loss	6–6	Jul 2019	ITF Nonthaburi, Thailand	W25	Hard	(South Korea) Jang Su-jeong	1–6, 6–2, 4–6
Loss	6–7	Jan 2020	ITF Hong Kong, China	W25	Hard	(Russia) Anastasiya Komardina	6–3, 4–6, 2–6
Win	7–7	Feb 2020	All Japan Indoor Championships	W60	Hard (i)	(Netherlands) Indy de Vroome	3–6, 6–3, 7–6^{(6)}

=== Doubles: 24 (9 titles, 15 runner-ups) ===
Legend W100 tournaments W60/75 tournaments W40/50 tournaments W25/35 tournaments W10/15 tournaments	Finals by surface Hard (9–14) Clay (0–1)

Result	W–L	Date	Tournament	Tier	Surface	Partner	Opponents	Score
Loss	0–1	Feb 2014	ITF Nonthaburi, Thailand	10,000	Hard	(United Kingdom) Katie Boulter	(China) Han Xinyun (China) Zhang Kailin	3–6, 0–6
Win	1–1	Aug 2015	ITF Gimcheon, South Korea	10,000	Hard	(China) Cao Siqi	(South Korea) Han Sung-hee (Japan) Makoto Ninomiya	7–6^{(2)}, 6–4
Loss	1–2	Mar 2016	ITF Nanjing, China	10,000	Hard	(China) Zhao Di	(Chinese Taipei) Lee Pei-chi (China) Zhang Ying	2–6, 5–7
Win	2–2	May 2016	Zhengzhou Open, China	50,000	Hard	(China) You Xiaodi	(Uzbekistan) Akgul Amanmuradova (Slovakia) Michaela Hončová	1–6, 6–2, [10–7]
Loss	2–3	Aug 2016	ITF Naiman, China	25,000	Hard (i)	(China) Sun Xuliu	(China) Tang Haochen (China) Zhang Yukun	6–7^{(0)}, 6–4, [4–10]
Loss	2–4	Dec 2016	ITF Hong Kong	10,000	Hard	(China) Zhang Ying	(Japan) Mai Minokoshi (South Korea) Park Sang-hee	6–4, 4–6, [7–10]
Loss	2–5	Apr 2017	Kunming Open, China	100,000	Clay	(India) Prarthana Thombare	(China) Han Xinyun (China) Ye Qiuyu	2–6, 5–7
Win	3–5	Jul 2017	ITF Naiman, China	25,000	Hard	(China) Gao Xinyu	(China) Lu Jingjing (China) You Xiaodi	6–7^{(5)}, 6–4, [10–8]
Loss	3–6	May 2018	Jin'an Open, China	60,000	Hard	(China) Liu Fangzhou	(United Kingdom) Harriet Dart (India) Ankita Raina	3–6, 3–6
Win	4–6	Aug 2018	ITF Guiyang, China	25,000	Hard	(China) Kang Jiaqi	(China) Chen Jiahui (China) Yuan Yue	3–6, 7–5, [10–6]
Win	5–6	Mar 2019	Pingshan Open, China	W60	Hard	(Chinese Taipei) Liang En-shuo	(Japan) Hiroko Kuwata (Uzbekistan) Sabina Sharipova	6–4, 6–1
Loss	5–7	Mar 2019	ITF Kofu, Japan	W25	Hard	(China) You Xiaodi	(Chinese Taipei) Chang Kai-chen (Chinese Taipei) Hsu Ching-wen	3–6, 4–6
Win	6–7	Jun 2019	ITF Luzhou, Japan	W25	Hard	(China) Feng Shuo	(China) Guo Hanyu (China) Ye Qiuyu	6–3, 6–1
Loss	6–8	Apr 2022	ITF Chiang Rai, Thailand	W25	Hard	(China) Ma Yexin	(Japan) Kyōka Okamura (Thailand) Peangtarn Plipuech	6–4, 3–6, [5–10]
Loss	6–9	Apr 2022	ITF Chiang Rai, Thailand	W15	Hard	(China) Ma Yexin	(Australia) Catherine Aulia (Australia) Talia Gibson	3–6, 6–7^{(5)}
Win	7–9	Apr 2022	ITF Chiang Rai, Thailand	W15	Hard	(China) Gao Xinyu	(Hong Kong) Maggie Ng (Hong Kong) Wu Ho-ching	6–3, 7–6^{(4)}
Loss	7–10	Jun 2022	ITF Chiang Rai, Thailand	W15	Hard	(China) Liu Fangzhou	(Japan) Anri Nagata (Japan) Naho Sato	2–6, 4–6
Win	8–10	Sep 2023	ITF Shenzhen, China	W15	Hard	(China) Zheng Wushuang	(Chinese Taipei) Lin Fang-an (China) Yuan Chengyiyi	7–5, 6–4
Loss	8–11	Jun 2024	ITF Tianjin, China	W15	Hard	(China) Yuan Chengyiyi	(South Korea) Kim Da-bin (South Korea) Kim Na-ri	2–6, 1–6
Win	9–11	Jul 2024	ITF Tianjin, China	W15	Hard	(China) Huang Yujia	(China) Aitiyaguli Aixirefu (China) Wang Jiaqi	6–0, 6–1
Loss	9–12	Aug 2024	ITF Xiamen, China	W15	Hard	(China) Lu Jingjing	(China) Huang Yujia (China) Zhang Ying	2–6, 5–7
Loss	9–13	Oct 2024	ITF Qiandaohu, China	W35	Hard	(China) Zhang Ying	Sofya Lansere; Ekaterina Shalimova	6–4, 4–6, [5–10]
Loss	9–14	Mar 2025	ITF Ma'anshan, China	W15	Hard	(China) Lu Jingjing	(South Korea) Kim Na-ri (China) Ye Qiuyu	4–6, 1–6
Loss	9–15	Mar 2025	ITF Shenzhen, China	W50	Hard	(China) Li Zongyu	(Hong Kong) Cody Wong (China) Zheng Wushuang	6–3, 5–7, [2–10]
