= Wang Meiling =

Chinese tennis player (born 2000)

Wang Meiling 王美玲
- Country (sports): China
- Born: 22 February 2000 (age 26)
- Plays: Left (two-handed backhand)
- Prize money: $137,864

Singles
- Career record: 173–139
- Career titles: 2 ITF
- Highest ranking: No. 320 (31 March 2025)
- Current ranking: No. 859 (19 October 2026)

Doubles
- Career record: 116–104
- Career titles: 5 ITF
- Highest ranking: No. 348 (19 May 2025)
- Current ranking: No. 373 (19 October 2026)
- Last updated on: 25 October 2026.

Wang Meiling (Chinese: 王美玲; pinyin: Wáng Měilíng; born 22 February 2000) is a Chinese female tennis player.

Wang has a career-high WTA singles ranking of 320, achieved on 31 March 2025. She also has a career-high WTA doubles ranking of 348, attained on 19 May 2025.

== Career ==
Wang made her WTA Tour main-draw debut at the 2018 Tianjin Open in the doubles tournament, partnering Liu Yanni.

In 2024, she received a wildcard for the main draw of the WTA 1000 China Open but lost to lucky loser Jana Fett in the first round.

== ITF Circuit finals ==
=== Singles: 4 (2 titles, 2 runner-ups) ===
Legend
W75 tournaments
W35 tournaments
W15 tournaments

Result	W–L	Date	Tournament	Tier	Surface	Opponent	Score
Loss	0–1	Apr 2023	ITF Sharm El Sheikh, Egypt	W15	Hard	Elena Pridankina	3–6, 1–6
Win	1–1	May 2023	ITF Kursumlijska Banja, Serbia	W15	Clay	(Slovenia) Živa Falkner	6–2, 7–6^{(6)}
Win	2–1	May 2024	ITF Lu'an, China	W75	Hard	(China) Yao Xinxin	7–5, 6–2
Loss	2–2	Oct 2024	ITF Qiandaohu, China	W35	Hard	(China) Guo Hanyu	2–6, 2–6

=== Doubles: 18 (5 titles, 13 runner-ups) ===
Legend
W50 tournaments
W25/35 tournaments
W15 tournaments

Result	W–L	Date	Tournament	Tier	Surface	Partnering	Opponents	Score
Loss	0–1	Jul 2019	ITF Ulanqab, China	W25	Hard	(China) Sun Xuliu	(Japan) Kyōka Okamura (Thailand) Peangtarn Plipuech	6–4, 5–7, [11–13]
Loss	0–2	Mar 2022	ITF Monastir, Tunisia	W15	Hard	(China) Lu Jingjing	(Lithuania) Andrė Lukošiūtė (United Kingdom) Eliz Maloney	w/o
Loss	0–3	Apr 2022	ITF Monastir, Tunisia	W15	Hard	(China) Yao Xinxin	(France) Yasmine Mansouri (France) Nina Radovanovic	5–7, 3–6
Win	1–3	Apr 2022	ITF Monastir, Tunisia	W15	Hard	(China) Yao Xinxin	(France) Victoria Muntean (Hungary) Rebeka Stolmár	6–2, 4–6, [10–3]
Loss	1–4	May 2022	ITF Monastir, Tunisia	W15	Hard	(China) Liu Fangzhou	(United Kingdom) Kristina Paskauskas (China) Wei Sijia	3–6, 6–7^{(4)}
Win	2–4	Apr 2023	ITF Sharm El Sheikh, Egypt	W25	Hard	(China) Gao Xinyu	Aglaya Fedorova; Darya Shauha	6–3, 6–2
Loss	2–5	May 2023	ITF Kursumlijska Banja, Serbia	W15	Clay	(China) Guo Meiqi	(Australia) Elena Micic (Serbia) Anja Stankovic	2–6, 4–6
Loss	2–6	Jun 2024	ITF Taizhou, China	W50	Hard	(China) Yao Xinxin	(Chinese Taipei) Cho I-hsuan (Chinese Taipei) Cho Yi-tsen	6–2, 6–7^{(5)}, [7–10]
Loss	2–7	Jun 2024	ITF Luzhou, China	W35	Hard	(China) Sun Yifan	(China) Huang Yujia (China) Xiao Zhenghua	6–7^{(5)}, 0–6
Loss	2–8	May 2025	Kurume Cup, Japan	W50+H	Carpet	(China) Ma Yexin	(Japan) Momoko Kobori (Japan) Ayano Shimizu	1–6, 7–5, [5–10]
Loss	2–9	Aug 2025	ITF Lu'an, China	W15	Hard	(Sweden) Tiana Tian Deng	(Chinese Taipei) Lin Fang-an (Chinese Taipei) Yang Ya-yi	4–6, 6–7^{(4)}
Win	3–9	Oct 2025	ITF Qiandaohu, China	W35	Hard	(China) Ye Qiuyu	(China) Hou Yanan (China) Yuan Chengyiyi	6–1, 6–2
Loss	3–10	Jan 2026	ITF Sharm El Sheikh, Egypt	W15	Hard	(China) Chen Mengyi	(Egypt) Lamis Abdel Aziz (China) Ren Yufei	6–7^{(4)}, 2–6
Loss	3–11	Feb 2026	ITF Sharm El Sheikh, Egypt	W15	Hard	(China) Liu Yuhan	(Egypt) Lamis Abdel Aziz (China) Ren Yufei	6–4, 6–7^{(3)}, [5–10]
Win	4–11	Mar 2026	ITF Maanshan, China	W15	Hard (i)	(Sweden) Tiana Tian Deng	(South Korea) Kim Na-ri (China) Ye Qiuyu	2–6, 7–5, [10–8]
Win	5–11	May 2026	ITF Lu'an, China	W15	Hard	(China) Hou Yanan	(China) Luo Xi (China) Wang Jiayi	4–6, 6–3, [10–8]
Loss	5–12	May 2026	ITF Wuning, China	W35	Hard	(China) Ye Qiuyu	(New Zealand) Monique Barry (Japan) Hikaru Sato	6–7^{(3)}, 4–6
Loss	5–13	Jun 2026	ITF Ma'anshan, China	W15	Hard (i)	(China) Yuan Chengyiyi	(China) Luo Xi (China) Wang Jiayi	6–0, 3–6, [9–11]
