= 2016 Gemdale ATP Challenger – Doubles =

Doubles
- 2016 Gemdale ATP Challenger

Final
- Champion: (Australia) Luke Saville (Australia) Jordan Thompson
- Runner-up: (India) Saketh Myneni (India) Jeevan Nedunchezhiyan
- Score: 3–6, 6–4, [12–10]

Events
| Singles | Doubles |
| ← 2015 · | Gemdale ATP Challenger | · 2017 → |

Gero Kretschmer and Alexander Satschko were the defending champions, but did not compete this year.

Luke Saville and Jordan Thompson won the title after defeating Saketh Myneni and Jeevan Nedunchezhiyan 3–6, 6–4, [12–10] in the final.

== Seeds ==
1. (Thailand) Sanchai Ratiwatana / (Thailand) Sonchat Ratiwatana (semifinals)
2. (Croatia) Dino Marcan / (Croatia) Franko Škugor (first round)
3. (China) Gong Maoxin / (Chinese Taipei) Yi Chu-huan (first round)
4. (Italy) Riccardo Ghedin / (China) Li Zhe (first round)

== Draw ==
=== Key ===
- Q = Qualifier
- WC = Wild card
- LL = Lucky loser
- Alt = Alternate
- SE = Special exempt
- PR = Protected ranking
- ITF = ITF entry
- JE = Junior exempt
- w/o = Walkover
- r = Retired
- d = Defaulted
- SR = Special ranking

First round
1 | (Thailand) Sa Ratiwatana (Thailand) So Ratiwatana | 6 | 6
(Germany) N Langer (Chinese Taipei) H-y Peng | 2 | 2
(Switzerland) M Chiudinelli (Slovakia) L Lacko | 4 | 7^{7} | [10]
(Russia) A Kudryavtsev (Ukraine) D Molchanov | 6 | 6^{5} | [3]
4 | (Italy) R Ghedin (China) Z Li | 3 | 3
WC | (Chinese Taipei) C-p Hsieh (China) Z Zhang | 6 | 6
(Austria) M Neuchrist (Netherlands) M Vervoort | 6^{3} | 4
(Australia) L Saville (Australia) J Thompson | 7^{7} | 6
WC | (Spain) E López-Pérez (China) C Wang | 6 | 7^{11}
(Italy) T Fabbiano (China) D Wu | 4 | 6^{9}
PR | (Czech Republic) R Jebavý (Czech Republic) J Šátral | 5 | 6 | [10]
3 | (China) M Gong (Chinese Taipei) C-h Yi | 7 | 4 | [3]
WC | (China) F Sun (China) Wang Aoxiong | 6^{5} | 4
(Japan) T Daniel (Spain) D Gimeno-Traver | 7^{7} | 6
(India) S Myneni (India) J Nedunchezhiyan | 6 | 4 | [17]
2 | (Croatia) D Marcan (Croatia) F Škugor | 4 | 6 | [15]

Quarterfinals
1 | (Thailand) Sa Ratiwatana (Thailand) So Ratiwatana | w/o
(Switzerland) M Chiudinelli (Slovakia) L Lacko
WC | (Chinese Taipei) C-p Hsieh (China) Z Zhang | 4 | 3
(Australia) L Saville (Australia) J Thompson | 6 | 6
WC | (Spain) E López-Pérez (China) C Wang | 3 | 2
PR | (Czech Republic) R Jebavý (Czech Republic) J Šátral | 6 | 6
(Japan) T Daniel (Spain) D Gimeno-Traver
(India) S Myneni (India) J Nedunchezhiyan | w/o

Semifinals
1 | (Thailand) Sa Ratiwatana (Thailand) So Ratiwatana | 1 | 4
(Australia) L Saville (Australia) J Thompson | 6 | 6
PR | (Czech Republic) R Jebavý (Czech Republic) J Šátral | 2 | 3
(India) S Myneni (India) J Nedunchezhiyan | 6 | 6

Final
(Australia) L Saville (Australia) J Thompson | 3 | 6 | [12]
(India) S Myneni (India) J Nedunchezhiyan | 6 | 4 | [10]
