= 2018 Pingshan Open – Men's doubles =

Men's doubles
- 2018 Pingshan Open

Final
- Champions: (Chinese Taipei) Hsieh Cheng-peng (Australia) Rameez Junaid
- Runners-up: (Ukraine) Denys Molchanov (Slovakia) Igor Zelenay
- Score: 7–6^{(7–3)}, 6–3

Events
Singles	men	women
Doubles	men	women
← 2017 ·	Pingshan Open	· 2019 →

Sanchai and Sonchat Ratiwatana were the defending champions but chose not to defend their title.

Hsieh Cheng-peng and Rameez Junaid won the title after defeating Denys Molchanov and Igor Zelenay 7–6^{(7–3)}, 6–3 in the final.

== Seeds ==
1. (India) Sriram Balaji / (Indonesia) Christopher Rungkat (quarterfinals)
2. (Ukraine) Denys Molchanov / (Slovakia) Igor Zelenay (final)
3. (Croatia) Marin Draganja / (Croatia) Tomislav Draganja (quarterfinals)
4. (Belarus) Aliaksandr Bury / (Chinese Taipei) Peng Hsien-yin (semifinals)

== Draw ==
=== Key ===
- Q = Qualifier
- WC = Wild card
- LL = Lucky loser
- Alt = Alternate
- SE = Special exempt
- PR = Protected ranking
- ITF = ITF entry
- JE = Junior exempt
- w/o = Walkover
- r = Retired
- d = Defaulted
- SR = Special ranking

First round
1	(India) S Balaji (Indonesia) C Rungkat	6	6
(China) Y He (China) Zh Zhang	4	4
(Japan) T Matsui (Chinese Taipei) C-h Yi	4	5
(Chinese Taipei) C-p Hsieh (Australia) R Junaid	6	7
4	(Belarus) A Bury (Chinese Taipei) H-y Peng	6	6
(Italy) S Caruso (Russia) A Vatutin	1	2
(Russia) M Elgin (Sweden) A Siljeström	7^{7}	6
(Italy) L Sonego (Italy) A Vavassori	6^{3}	4
(Spain) G Granollers (China) Z Li	3	6^{4}
(China) R Te (China) D Wu	6	7^{7}
(Poland) H Hurkacz (Poland) K Majchrzak	5	6^{5}
3	(Croatia) M Draganja (Croatia) T Draganja	7	7^{7}
(Belarus) U Ignatik (Austria) T-S Weissborn	6^{3}	6	[11]
(Croatia) V Galović (Serbia) N Milojević	7^{7}	2	[13]
(China) X Gao (China) Ze Zhang	4	7^{9}	[5]
2	(Ukraine) D Molchanov (Slovakia) I Zelenay	6	6^{7}	[10]

Quarterfinals
1	(India) S Balaji (Indonesia) C Rungkat	7	4	[8]
(Chinese Taipei) C-p Hsieh (Australia) R Junaid	5	6	[10]
4	(Belarus) A Bury (Chinese Taipei) H-y Peng	2	6	[10]
(Russia) M Elgin (Sweden) A Siljeström	6	2	[7]
(China) R Te (China) D Wu	4	6	[10]
3	(Croatia) M Draganja (Croatia) T Draganja	6	3	[7]
(Croatia) V Galović (Serbia) N Milojević	2	3
2	(Ukraine) D Molchanov (Slovakia) I Zelenay	6	6

Semifinals
(Chinese Taipei) C-p Hsieh (Australia) R Junaid	7^{7}	3	[10]
4	(Belarus) A Bury (Chinese Taipei) H-y Peng	6^{3}	6	[7]
(China) R Te (China) D Wu	2	6	[5]
2	(Ukraine) D Molchanov (Slovakia) I Zelenay	6	3	[10]

Final
(Chinese Taipei) C-p Hsieh (Australia) R Junaid	7^{7}	6
2	(Ukraine) D Molchanov (Slovakia) I Zelenay	6^{3}	3
