= 2016 Gemdale ATP Challenger – Singles =

Singles
- 2016 Gemdale ATP Challenger

Final
- Champion: (Israel) Dudi Sela
- Runner-up: (China) Wu Di
- Score: 6–4, 6–3

Events
Singles	Doubles
← 2015 ·	Gemdale ATP Challenger	· 2017 →

Blaž Kavčič was the defending champion, but did not compete this year.

Dudi Sela won the title after defeating Wu Di 6–4, 6–3 in the final.

== Seeds ==
1. (Japan) Taro Daniel (first round)
2. (Israel) Dudi Sela (champion)
3. (Spain) Daniel Gimeno-Traver (first round)
4. (Serbia) Filip Krajinović (first round)
5. (Slovakia) Lukáš Lacko (first round)
6. (Georgia (country)) Nikoloz Basilashvili (second round)
7. (Belgium) Kimmer Coppejans (first round)
8. (Australia) Jordan Thompson (quarterfinals)

== Draw ==
=== Key ===
- Q = Qualifier
- WC = Wild card
- LL = Lucky loser
- Alt = Alternate
- SE = Special exempt
- PR = Protected ranking
- ITF = ITF entry
- JE = Junior exempt
- w/o = Walkover
- r = Retired
- d = Defaulted
- SR = Special ranking

=== Finals ===
Semifinals
(Italy) Thomas Fabbiano	2	6	6^{6}
(China) Wu Di	6	1	7^{8}
(Czech Republic) Adam Pavlásek	1	2
2	(Israel) Dudi Sela	6	6

Final
(China) Wu Di	4	3
2	(Israel) Dudi Sela	6	6

=== Top half ===
First round
1	(Japan) T Daniel	6	0	3
(Italy) T Fabbiano	4	6	6
(Australia) L Saville	6	6
WC	(China) Chen Long	0	4
(Russia) A Kudryavtsev	2	5
Q	(Czech Republic) J Šátral	6	7
(China) Z Zhang	5	4
8	(Australia) J Thompson	7	6
4	(Serbia) F Krajinović	4	1
(China) D Wu	6	6
Q	(Croatia) V Galović	7^{7}	4	6
(Slovenia) B Rola	6^{3}	6	4
(Switzerland) M Chuidinelli	6	4	5
(Turkey) M İlhan	3	6	7
(Japan) H Moriya	6	6
7	(Belgium) K Coppejans	2	2

Second round
(Italy) T Fabbiano	6	6
(Australia) L Saville	3	4
Q	(Czech Republic) J Šátral	5	2
8	(Australia) J Thompson	7	6
(China) D Wu	6	6
Q	(Croatia) V Galović	4	3
(Turkey) M İlhan	6	6
(Japan) H Moriya	4	3

Quarterfinals
(Italy) T Fabbiano	6	7
8	(Australia) J Thompson	3	5
(China) D Wu	7^{7}	6
(Turkey) M İlhan	6^{5}	4

Semifinals
(Italy) T Fabbiano	2	6	6^{6}
(China) D Wu	6	1	7^{8}

=== Bottom half ===
First round
5	(Slovakia) L Lacko	5	3
(India) S Myneni	7	6
(Japan) G Soeda	6	6
WC	(China) F Sun	4	2
(Czech Republic) A Pavlásek	7^{7}	6
WC	(China) C Wang	6^{1}	1
SE	(China) Z Li	6	6^{4}	6
3	(Spain) D Gimeno-Traver	3	7^{7}	1
6	(Georgia (country)) N Basilashvili	2	6	6
(Croatia) F Škugor	6	1	4
WC	(China) Qi Xi	0	4
(Germany) P Gojowczyk	6	6
(Germany) N Langer	7^{7}	4	4
Q	(Belgium) N Desein	6^{3}	6	6
Q	(Spain) E López-Pérez	4	3
2	(Israel) D Sela	6	6

Second round
(India) S Myneni	6	6
(Japan) G Soeda	3	1
(Czech Republic) A Pavlásek	6	6
SE	(China) Z Li	4	3
6	(Georgia (country)) N Basilashvili	3	4
(Germany) P Gojowczyk	6	6
Q	(Belgium) N Desein	3	2
2	(Israel) D Sela	6	6

Quarterfinals
(India) S Myneni	3	1
(Czech Republic) A Pavlásek	6	6
(Germany) P Gojowczyk	4	1
2	(Israel) D Sela	6	6

Semifinals
(Czech Republic) A Pavlásek	1	2
2	(Israel) D Sela	6	6
