= 2018 Pingshan Open =

- Date: 12–18 March
- Edition: 5th (ATP); 4th (ITF)
- Category: ATP Challenger Tour; ITF Women's Circuit
- Prize money: $75,000+H (ATP) $60,000 (ITF)
- Surface: Hard
- Location: Shenzhen, China

Champions

Men's singles
- (Belarus) Ilya Ivashka

Women's singles
- (Slovakia) Viktória Kužmová

Men's doubles
- (Chinese Taipei) Hsieh Cheng-peng / (Australia) Rameez Junaid

Women's doubles
- (Russia) Anna Kalinskaya / (Slovakia) Viktória Kužmová
← 2017 ·	Pingshan Open	· 2019 →

The 2018 Pingshan Open was a professional tennis tournament played on hard courts. It was the fifth (ATP) and fourth (ITF) editions of the tournament and part of the 2018 ATP Challenger Tour and the 2018 ITF Women's Circuit. It took place in Shenzhen, China between 12 and 18 March 2018.

== Men's singles main-draw entrants ==
=== Seeds ===
Country	Player	Rank^{1}	Seed
TUN	Malek Jaziri	84	1
AUS	Jordan Thompson	98	2
SLO	Blaž Kavčič	116	3
ESP	Marcel Granollers	131	4
GER	Yannick Maden	136	5
GER	Oscar Otte	137	6
BLR	Ilya Ivashka	148	7
EST	Jürgen Zopp	149	8

- ^{1} Rankings are as of 5 March 2018.

=== Other entrants ===
The following players received wildcards into the singles main draw:

- (China) Li Zhe
- (China) Wu Di
- (China) Zhang Ze
- (China) Zhang Zhizhen

The following players received entry into the singles main draw as special exempts:

- (Australia) Alex Bolt
- (Poland) Hubert Hurkacz

The following players received entry from the qualifying draw:

- (Australia) Jason Kubler
- (Japan) Hiroki Moriya
- (Italy) Stefano Napolitano
- (Slovenia) Blaž Rola

== Women's singles main-draw entrants ==
=== Seeds ===
Country	Player	Rank^{1}	Seed
CZE	Denisa Allertová	87	1
THA	Luksika Kumkhum	98	2
SVK	Viktória Kužmová	113	3
JPN	Nao Hibino	121	4
CHN	Zheng Saisai	122	5
MNE	Danka Kovinić	124	6
RUS	Anna Blinkova	134	7
SVK	Anna Karolína Schmiedlová	135	8

- ^{1} Rankings are as of 5 March 2018.

=== Other entrants ===
The following players received wildcards into the singles main draw:

- (China) Guo Meiqi
- (China) Ma Shuyue
- (China) Xun Fangying
- (China) Yuan Yue

The following player received entry using a junior exempt:

- (China) Wang Xinyu

The following players received entry by special exemptions:

- (Ukraine) Marta Kostyuk
- (Belgium) Maryna Zanevska

The following players received entry from the qualifying draw:

- (China) Gao Xinyu
- (Serbia) Ivana Jorović
- (Poland) Urszula Radwańska
- (Uzbekistan) Sabina Sharipova

== Champions ==
=== Men's singles ===
- (Belarus) Ilya Ivashka def. (China) Zhang Ze, 6–4, 6–2.

=== Women's singles ===
- (Slovakia) Viktória Kužmová def. (Russia) Anna Kalinskaya, 7–5, 6–3.

=== Men's doubles ===
- (Chinese Taipei) Hsieh Cheng-peng / (Australia) Rameez Junaid def. (Ukraine) Denys Molchanov / (Slovakia) Igor Zelenay, 7–6^{(7–3)}, 6–3.

=== Women's doubles ===
- (Russia) Anna Kalinskaya / (Slovakia) Viktória Kužmová def. (Montenegro) Danka Kovinić / (China) Wang Xinyu, 6–4, 1–6, [10–7].
