= 2015 Gemdale ATP Challenger China International Shenzhen – Doubles =

Doubles
- 2015 Gemdale ATP Challenger China International Shenzhen

Final
- Champions: (Germany) Gero Kretschmer (Germany) Alexander Satschko
- Runners-up: (India) Saketh Myneni (India) Divij Sharan
- Score: 6–1, 3–6, [10–2]

Events
| Singles | Doubles |
| ← 2014 · | Gemdale ATP Challenger China International Shenzhen | · 2016 → |

Sam Groth and Chris Guccione were the defending champions, but did not participate.
Gero Kretschmer and Alexander Satschko won the title, defeating Saketh Myneni and Divij Sharan in the final, 6–1, 3–6, [10–2].

== Seeds ==
1. (United Kingdom) Colin Fleming / (United Kingdom) Jonathan Marray (semifinals)
2. (France) Fabrice Martin / (India) Purav Raja (first round)
3. (China) Gong Maoxin / (Chinese Taipei) Peng Hsien-yin (semifinals)
4. (Germany) Gero Kretschmer / (Germany) Alexander Satschko (champions)

== Draw ==
=== Key ===
- Q = Qualifier
- WC = Wild card
- LL = Lucky loser
- Alt = Alternate
- SE = Special exempt
- PR = Protected ranking
- ITF = ITF entry
- JE = Junior exempt
- w/o = Walkover
- r = Retired
- d = Defaulted
- SR = Special ranking

First round
1 | (United Kingdom) C Fleming (United Kingdom) J Marray | 6 | 6^{4} | [12]
(Netherlands) W Koolhof (Netherlands) M Middelkoop | 4 | 7^{7} | [10]
(Chinese Taipei) T Chen (Chinese Taipei) T-h Yang | 5 | 7^{8} | [6]
(Japan) H Moriya (China) Z Zhang | 7 | 6^{6} | [10]
4 | (Germany) G Kretschmer (Germany) A Satschko | 6 | 6
WC | (Hungary) M Fucsovics (China) D Wu | 4 | 3
WC | (China) Z Li (Japan) T Matsui | 6 | 3 | [10]
(Italy) R Ghedin (Philippines) R Gonzales | 4 | 6 | [4]
WC | (Chinese Taipei) L-c Huang (China) C Wang | 7 | 4 | [9]
(Russia) A Kudryavtsev (Kazakhstan) A Nedovyesov | 5 | 6 | [10]
(France) T Lamasine (Bosnia and Herzegovina) A Šetkić | 2 | 2
3 | (China) M Gong (Chinese Taipei) H-y Peng | 6 | 6
(Brazil) A Ghem (Spain) D Muñoz de la Nava | 6 | 6
(Thailand) Sa Ratiwatana (Thailand) So Ratiwatana | 3 | 2
(India) S Myneni (India) D Sharan | 6^{10} | 6 | [10]
2 | (France) F Martin (India) P Raja | 7^{12} | 3 | [8]

Quarterfinals
1 | (United Kingdom) C Fleming (United Kingdom) J Marray
(Japan) H Moriya (China) Z Zhang | w/o
4 | (Germany) G Kretschmer (Germany) A Satschko | 6 | 6
WC | (China) Z Li (Japan) T Matsui | 2 | 4
(Russia) A Kudryavtsev (Kazakhstan) A Nedovyesov | 6 | 3 | [3]
3 | (China) M Gong (Chinese Taipei) H-y Peng | 3 | 6 | [10]
(Brazil) A Ghem (Spain) D Muñoz de la Nava | 6 | 6^{2} | [5]
(India) S Myneni (India) D Sharan | 4 | 7^{7} | [10]

Semifinals
1 | (United Kingdom) C Fleming (United Kingdom) J Marray | 6 | 3 | [8]
4 | (Germany) G Kretschmer (Germany) A Satschko | 3 | 6 | [10]
3 | (China) M Gong (Chinese Taipei) H-y Peng | 6 | 6^{2} | [5]
(India) S Myneni (India) D Sharan | 2 | 7^{7} | [10]

Final
4 | (Germany) G Kretschmer (Germany) A Satschko | 6 | 3 | [10]
(India) S Myneni (India) D Sharan | 1 | 6 | [2]
