= 2014 Gemdale ATP Challenger – Singles =

Singles
- 2014 Gemdale ATP Challenger

Final
- Champion: (Luxembourg) Gilles Müller
- Runner-up: (Slovakia) Lukáš Lacko
- Score: 7-6^{(7–4)}, 6–3

Events
Singles	Doubles
Gemdale ATP Challenger	· 2015 →

This was the first edition of the tournament.

Gilles Müller won the title, defeating Lukáš Lacko in the final, 7-6^{(7–4)}, 6–3.

== Seeds ==
1. (Chinese Taipei) Lu Yen-hsun (semifinals)
2. (Slovakia) Lukáš Lacko (final)
3. (Japan) Go Soeda (first round)
4. (Australia) Samuel Groth (first round)
5. (Japan) Tatsuma Ito (quarterfinals)
6. (Japan) Yūichi Sugita (first round)
7. (Slovenia) Grega Žemlja (first round)
8. (Japan) Hiroki Moriya (semifinals)

== Draw ==
=== Key ===
- Q = Qualifier
- WC = Wild card
- LL = Lucky loser
- Alt = Alternate
- SE = Special exempt
- PR = Protected ranking
- ITF = ITF entry
- JE = Junior exempt
- w/o = Walkover
- r = Retired
- d = Defaulted
- SR = Special ranking

=== Finals ===
Semifinals
1	(Chinese Taipei) Lu Yen-hsun	6^{11}	4
(Luxembourg) Gilles Müller	7^{13}	6
8	(Japan) Hiroki Moriya	1	6	2
2	(Slovakia) Lukáš Lacko	6	3	6

Final
(Luxembourg) Gilles Müller	7^{7}	6
2	(Slovakia) Lukáš Lacko	6^{4}	3

=== Top half ===
First round
1	(Chinese Taipei) Y-h Lu	6	6
WC	(China) M Gong	2	0
Q	(United States) J Jung	3	2
(India) S Myneni	6	6
(Germany) T Puetz	6	6
WC	(China) C Wang	0	3
(Russia) K Kravchuk	4	4
5	(Japan) T Ito	6	6
3	(Japan) G Soeda	3	5
(Luxembourg) G Müller	6	7
(United Kingdom) D Cox	6	6
WC	(China) X Gao	0	3
Q	(Japan) Shuichi Sekiguchi	5	6^{4}
(Japan) Y Uchiyama	7	7^{7}
(China) Z Zhang	6	6
7	(Slovenia) G Žemlja	1	1

Second round
1	(Chinese Taipei) Y-h Lu	6	7
(India) S Myneni	2	5
(Germany) T Puetz	4	0
5	(Japan) T Ito	6	6
(Luxembourg) G Müller	6	6
(United Kingdom) D Cox	3	4
(Japan) Y Uchiyama	1	3
(China) Z Zhang	6	6

Quarterfinals
1	(Chinese Taipei) Y-h Lu	6	7
5	(Japan) T Ito	3	5
(Luxembourg) G Müller	6	7
(China) Z Zhang	1	5

Semifinals
1	(Chinese Taipei) Y-h Lu	6^{11}	4
(Luxembourg) G Müller	7^{13}	6

=== Bottom half ===
First round
8	(Japan) H Moriya	6	6
WC	(China) B Ouyang	4	4
(Chinese Taipei) T-h Yang	4	7^{7}	6
(Lithuania) L Grigelis	6	6^{3}	4
(Russia) A Kudryavtsev	5	4
(Switzerland) M Chiudinelli	7	6
Q	(Germany) D Meffert	6	6
4	(Australia) S Groth	4	4
6	(Japan) Y Sugita	1	2
(Israel) A Weintraub	6	6
(Australia) L Saville	4	6^{7}
(Australia) M Reid	6	7^{9}
Q	(Croatia) N Mektić	6	3	6
LL	(Chinese Taipei) L-c Huang	4	6	1
(China) D Wu	7^{12}	1	4
2	(Slovakia) L Lacko	6^{10}	6	6

Second round
8	(Japan) H Moriya	6	6
(Chinese Taipei) T-h Yang	3	1
(Switzerland) M Chiudinelli	6	6
Q	(Germany) D Meffert	1	2
(Israel) A Weintraub	6^{5}	4
(Australia) M Reid	7^{7}	6
Q	(Croatia) N Mektić	4	6^{6}
2	(Slovakia) L Lacko	6	7^{8}

Quarterfinals
8	(Japan) H Moriya	7	4	6
(Switzerland) M Chiudinelli	5	6	4
(Australia) M Reid	5	4
2	(Slovakia) L Lacko	7	6

Semifinals
8	(Japan) H Moriya	1	6	2
2	(Slovakia) L Lacko	6	3	6
