= 2017 Pingshan Open – Women's singles =

Women's singles
- 2017 Pingshan Open

Final
- Champion: (Russia) Ekaterina Alexandrova
- Runner-up: (Belarus) Aryna Sabalenka
- Score: 6–2, 7–5

Events
Singles	men	women
Doubles	men	women
← 2016 ·	Pingshan Open	· 2018 →

Wang Qiang was the defending champion but chose not to defend her title.

Ekaterina Alexandrova won the title, defeating Aryna Sabalenka in the final, 6–2, 7–5.

== Seeds ==
1. (Chinese Taipei) Hsieh Su-wei (quarterfinals)
2. (China) Zheng Saisai (first round, retired)
3. (Russia) Ekaterina Alexandrova (champion)
4. (Czech Republic) Denisa Allertová (quarterfinals, withdrew)
5. (Chinese Taipei) Chang Kai-chen (second round)
6. (China) Han Xinyun (first round, retired)
7. (Belgium) Maryna Zanevska (first round, retired)
8. (Serbia) Nina Stojanović (second round)

== Draw ==
=== Key ===
- Q = Qualifier
- WC = Wild card
- LL = Lucky loser
- Alt = Alternate
- SE = Special exempt
- PR = Protected ranking
- ITF = ITF entry
- JE = Junior exempt
- w/o = Walkover
- r = Retired
- d = Defaulted
- SR = Special ranking

=== Finals ===
Semifinals
(Russia) Anna Kalinskaya	5	0
3	(Russia) Ekaterina Alexandrova	7	6
(Belarus) Aryna Sabalenka	6	6
Q	(China) Lu Jingjing	2	1

Final
3	(Russia) Ekaterina Alexandrova	6	7
(Belarus) Aryna Sabalenka	2	5

=== Top half ===
First round
1	(Chinese Taipei) S-w Hsieh	6	7^{7}
(Australia) L Cabrera	3	6^{4}
(Turkey) İ Soylu	6	6
WC	(China) Yi Zhang	3	2
(Japan) H Kuwata	7	6
WC	(China) Yuk Zhang	5	3
(Russia) A Kalinskaya	7	4
7	(Belgium) M Zanevska	5	1^{r}
3	(Russia) E Alexandrova	2	6	6
(China) F Liu	6	3	1
(Israel) J Glushko	3	0
(Czech Republic) B Štefková	6	6
(Kazakhstan) Z Diyas	4	2
(Tunisia) O Jabeur	6	6
(South Korea) S-j Jang	6	3
6	(China) X Han	4	0^{r}

Second round
1	(Chinese Taipei) S-w Hsieh	6	6
(Turkey) İ Soylu	2	2
(Japan) H Kuwata	4	3
(Russia) A Kalinskaya	6	6
3	(Russia) E Alexandrova	6	6
(Czech Republic) B Štefková	4	3
(Tunisia) O Jabeur	6	6
(South Korea) S-j Jang	4	4

Quarterfinals
1	(Chinese Taipei) S-w Hsieh	2	4
(Russia) A Kalinskaya	6	6
3	(Russia) E Alexandrova	6	6^{3}	7^{7}
(Tunisia) O Jabeur	2	7^{7}	6^{5}

Semifinals
(Russia) A Kalinskaya	5	0
3	(Russia) E Alexandrova	7	6

=== Bottom half ===
First round
5	(Chinese Taipei) K-c Chang	6	7^{8}
WC	(China) Yux Zhang	3	6^{6}
WC	(China) Jia Lu	5	2
(Belarus) A Sabalenka	7	6
(Hungary) D Gálfi	1	6	6
(Slovenia) D Jakupović	6	3	4
(United Kingdom) T Moore	2	1
4	(Czech Republic) D Allertová	6	6
8	(Serbia) N Stojanović	7^{7}	6
(Netherlands) A Rus	6^{5}	3
Q	(Belarus) V Lapko	6	6
Q	(Italy) J Pieri	1	2
Q	(Thailand) L Kumkhum	6	6
(Switzerland) A Sadiković	1	4
Q	(China) Jin Lu	6	2
2	(China) S Zheng	0	1^{r}

Second round
5	(Chinese Taipei) K-c Chang	1	6^{4}
(Belarus) A Sabalenka	6	7^{7}
(Hungary) D Gálfi	6^{5}	6	2
4	(Czech Republic) D Allertová	7^{7}	0	6
8	(Serbia) N Stojanović	3	2
Q	(Belarus) V Lapko	6	6
Q	(Thailand) L Kumkhum	2	7^{7}	2
Q	(China) Jin Lu	6	6^{5}	6

Quarterfinals
(Belarus) A Sabalenka	w/o
4	(Czech Republic) D Allertová
Q	(Belarus) V Lapko	3	5
Q	(China) Jin Lu	6	7

Semifinals
(Belarus) A Sabalenka	6	6
Q	(China) Jin Lu	2	1
