= 2017 Pingshan Open – Men's singles =

Men's singles
- 2017 Pingshan Open

Final
- Champion: (Japan) Yūichi Sugita
- Runner-up: (Slovenia) Blaž Kavčič
- Score: 7–6^{(8–6)}, 6–4

Events
Singles	men	women
Doubles	men	women
← 2016 ·	Pingshan Open	· 2018 →

Dudi Sela was the defending champion but chose not to defend his title.

Yūichi Sugita won the title after defeating Blaž Kavčič 7–6^{(8–6)}, 6–4 in the final.

== Seeds ==
1. (Russia) Evgeny Donskoy (quarterfinals)
2. (Japan) Yūichi Sugita (champion)
3. (Spain) Roberto Carballés Baena (first round)
4. (South Korea) Lee Duck-hee (quarterfinals)
5. (Italy) Luca Vanni (semifinals)
6. (Slovenia) Blaž Kavčič (final)
7. (Germany) Maximilian Marterer (quarterfinals)
8. (Italy) Thomas Fabbiano (quarterfinals)

== Draw ==
=== Key ===
- Q = Qualifier
- WC = Wild card
- LL = Lucky loser
- Alt = Alternate
- SE = Special exempt
- PR = Protected ranking
- ITF = ITF entry
- JE = Junior exempt
- w/o = Walkover
- r = Retired
- d = Defaulted
- SR = Special ranking

=== Finals ===
Semifinals
6	(Slovenia) Blaž Kavčič	6	6
5	(Italy) Luca Vanni	2	2
PR	(India) Yuki Bhambri	6	4	3
2	(Japan) Yūichi Sugita	4	6	6

Final
6	(Slovenia) Blaž Kavčič	6^{6}	4
2	(Japan) Yūichi Sugita	7^{8}	6

=== Top half ===
First round
1	(Russia) E Donskoy	3	6	7^{7}
(Belarus) I Ivashka	6	3	6^{0}
(Portugal) P Sousa	4	0
(Kazakhstan) A Nedovyesov	6	6
WC	(China) C Wang	3	6	6
(Canada) S Diez	6	4	3
(Serbia) L Đere	3	1
6	(Slovenia) B Kavčič	6	6
4	(South Korea) D-h Lee	6	5	6
(Japan) T Ito	1	7	4
Q	(Poland) H Hurkacz	6	6
(China) D Wu	3	3
WC	(China) Zheng Wei Qiang	2	2
WC	(China) Y Bai	6	6
(Spain) E López-Pérez	3	2
5	(Italy) L Vanni	6	6

Second round
1	(Russia) E Donskoy	6	6
(Kazakhstan) A Nedovyesov	2	4
WC	(China) C Wang	1	2
6	(Slovenia) B Kavčič	6	6
4	(South Korea) D-h Lee	6	2	7^{7}
Q	(Poland) H Hurkacz	3	6	6^{5}
WC	(China) Y Bai	1	2
5	(Italy) L Vanni	6	6

Quarterfinals
1	(Russia) E Donskoy	6	5	3
6	(Slovenia) B Kavčič	2	7	6
4	(South Korea) D-h Lee	1	3
5	(Italy) L Vanni	6	6

Semifinals
6	(Slovenia) B Kavčič	6	6
5	(Italy) L Vanni	2	2

=== Bottom half ===
First round
7	(Germany) M Marterer	7^{7}	6
Q	(Russia) R Safiullin	6^{9}	3
Alt	(Japan) Y Uchiyama	2^{r}
(Belarus) U Ignatik	5
(Italy) S Napolitano	5	2
PR	(India) Y Bhambri	7	6
(Serbia) N Milojević	4	6	7
3	(Spain) R Carballés Baena	6	4	5
8	(Italy) T Fabbiano	6	6
(Japan) H Moriya	4	4
(Argentina) A Velotti	0	1
Q	(Croatia) F Škugor	6	6
(Czech Republic) J Šátral	6	6
Q	(France) A Michon	1	2
WC	(China) Zh Zhang	2	2
2	(Japan) Y Sugita	6	6

Second round
7	(Germany) M Marterer	4	6	7^{8}
(Belarus) U Ignatik	6	4	6^{6}
PR	(India) Y Bhambri	6	6
(Serbia) N Milojević	3	1
8	(Italy) T Fabbiano	6	6
Q	(Croatia) F Škugor	4	4
(Czech Republic) J Šátral	7^{7}	3	2
2	(Japan) Y Sugita	6^{5}	6	6

Quarterfinals
7	(Germany) M Marterer	3	6	5
PR	(India) Y Bhambri	6	3	7
8	(Italy) T Fabbiano	2	4
2	(Japan) Y Sugita	6	6

Semifinals
PR	(India) Y Bhambri	6	4	3
2	(Japan) Y Sugita	4	6	6
