= 2018 Pingshan Open – Men's singles =

Men's singles
- 2018 Pingshan Open

Final
- Champion: (Belarus) Ilya Ivashka
- Runner-up: (China) Zhang Ze
- Score: 6–4, 6–2

Events
Singles	men	women
Doubles	men	women
← 2017 ·	Pingshan Open	· 2019 →

Yūichi Sugita was the defending champion but chose not to defend his title.

Ilya Ivashka won the title after defeating Zhang Ze 6–4, 6–2 in the final.

== Seeds ==
1. (Tunisia) Malek Jaziri (quarterfinals)
2. (Australia) Jordan Thompson (first round)
3. (Slovenia) Blaž Kavčič (first round)
4. (Spain) Marcel Granollers (first round)
5. (Germany) Yannick Maden (second round)
6. (Germany) Oscar Otte (second round)
7. (Belarus) Ilya Ivashka (champion)
8. (Estonia) Jürgen Zopp (quarterfinals)

== Draw ==
=== Key ===
- Q = Qualifier
- WC = Wild card
- LL = Lucky loser
- Alt = Alternate
- SE = Special exempt
- PR = Protected ranking
- ITF = ITF entry
- JE = Junior exempt
- w/o = Walkover
- r = Retired
- d = Defaulted
- SR = Special ranking

=== Finals ===
Semifinals
SE	(Poland) Hubert Hurkacz	6^{11}	6	2
WC	(China) Zhang Ze	7^{13}	2	6
(Japan) Tatsuma Ito	3	2
7	(Belarus) Ilya Ivashka	6	6

Final
WC	(China) Zhang Ze	4	2
7	(Belarus) Ilya Ivashka	6	6

=== Top half ===
First round
1	(Tunisia) M Jaziri	7	1	7
(Serbia) N Milojević	5	6	5
(Chinese Taipei) J Jung	6	5	4
(South Korea) D-h Lee	4	7	6
SE	(Poland) H Hurkacz	6^{4}	7^{7}	6
(Italy) L Sonego	7^{7}	6^{4}	3
Q	(Slovenia) B Rola	2	3
5	(Germany) Y Maden	6	6
4	(Spain) M Granollers	3	4
(Serbia) M Kecmanović	6	6
Q	(Australia) J Kubler	6	5	3
(Croatia) V Galović	3	7	6
(Spain) J Munar	6	4	2
WC	(China) Ze Zhang	3	6	6
WC	(China) Zh Zhang	3	0
6	(Germany) O Otte	6	6

Second round
1	(Tunisia) M Jaziri	6	6
(South Korea) D-h Lee	2	2
SE	(Poland) H Hurkacz	6	6
5	(Germany) Y Maden	3	4
(Serbia) M Kecmanović	1	2
(Croatia) V Galović	6	6
WC	(China) Ze Zhang	6	7
6	(Germany) O Otte	1	5

Quarterfinals
1	(Tunisia) M Jaziri	7^{7}	5	4
SE	(Poland) H Hurkacz	6^{1}	7	6
(Croatia) V Galović	4	7^{8}	3
WC	(China) Ze Zhang	6	6^{6}	6

Semifinals
SE	(Poland) H Hurkacz	6^{11}	6	2
WC	(China) Ze Zhang	7^{13}	2	6

=== Bottom half ===
First round
8	(Estonia) J Zopp	2	7	6
SE	(Australia) A Bolt	6	5	4
(Russia) A Vatutin	2	3
WC	(China) Z Li	6	6
WC	(China) D Wu	6^{5}	7	5
(Japan) T Ito	7^{7}	5	7
(Belarus) U Ignatik	7^{7}	3	6
3	(Slovenia) B Kavčič	6^{3}	6	3
7	(Belarus) I Ivashka	6	6
Q	(Italy) S Napolitano	3	4
(South Korea) S-w Kwon	0	3
(Germany) M Moraing	6	6
(Japan) G Soeda	4	6	4
(Italy) S Caruso	6	4	6
Q	(Japan) H Moriya	4	6	6
2	(Australia) J Thompson	6	2	3

Second round
8	(Estonia) J Zopp	7	0	7
WC	(China) Z Li	5	6	5
(Japan) T Ito	1	6	6
(Belarus) U Ignatik	6	3	4
7	(Belarus) I Ivashka	5
(Germany) M Moraing	0^{r}
(Italy) S Caruso	6	3	6
Q	(Japan) H Moriya	3	6	4

Quarterfinals
8	(Estonia) J Zopp	3	4
(Japan) T Ito	6	6
7	(Belarus) I Ivashka	6	6
(Italy) S Caruso	3	3

Semifinals
(Japan) T Ito	3	2
7	(Belarus) I Ivashka	6	6
