= 2014 Gemdale ATP Challenger =

- Date: 21 – 27 April
- Edition: 1st
- Draw: 32S / 16D
- Prize money: $50,000+H
- Surface: Hard
- Location: Shenzhen, China

Champions

Singles
- (Luxembourg) Gilles Müller

Doubles
- (Australia) Samuel Groth / (Australia) Chris Guccione
Gemdale ATP Challenger	· 2015 →

The 2014 Gemdale ATP Challenger was a professional tennis tournament played on hard courts. It was the first edition of the tournament which was part of the 2014 ATP Challenger Tour. It took place in Shenzhen, China between 21 and 27 April 2014.

== Singles main draw entrants ==
=== Seeds ===
Country	Player	Rank	Seed
TPE	Lu Yen-hsun	52	1
SVK	Lukáš Lacko	58	2
JPN	Go Soeda	136	3
AUS	Samuel Groth	138	4
JPN	Tatsuma Ito	145	5
JPN	Yūichi Sugita	149	6
SVN	Grega Žemlja	164	7
JPN	Hiroki Moriya	174	8

=== Other entrants ===
The following players received wildcards into the singles main draw:

- (China) Gong Maoxin
- (China) Wang Chuhan
- (China) Gao Xin
- (China) Ouyang Bowen

The following players received entry from the qualifying draw:

- (United States) Jason Jung
- (Japan) Shuichi Sekiguchi
- (Germany) Dominik Meffert
- (Croatia) Nikola Mektić

== Doubles main draw entrants ==
=== Seeds ===
Country	Player	Country	Player	Rank	Seed
AUS	Samuel Groth	AUS	Chris Guccione	138	1
THA	Sanchai Ratiwatana	THA	Sonchat Ratiwatana	183	2
AUS	Alex Bolt	AUS	Andrew Whittington	206	3
RUS	Victor Baluda	RUS	Konstantin Kravchuk	226	4

=== Other entrants ===
The following pairs received wildcards into the doubles main draw:

- (United Kingdom) Daniel Cox / (China) Wu Di
- (China) Gong Maoxin / (China) Zhang Ze
- (China) Liu Xiyu / (China) Wang Chuhan

The following pair received entry from the qualifying draw:

- (Chinese Taipei) Lee Hsin-han / (Australia) Matt Reid

== Champions ==
=== Singles ===
- (Luxembourg) Gilles Müller def. (Slovakia) Lukáš Lacko, 7–6^{(7–4)}, 6–3

=== Doubles ===
- (Australia) Samuel Groth / (Australia) Chris Guccione def. (Germany) Dominik Meffert / (Germany) Tim Puetz, 6–3, 7–6^{(7–5)}
