= 2017 Pingshan Open – Men's doubles =

Men's doubles
- 2017 Pingshan Open

Final
- Champions: (Thailand) Sanchai Ratiwatana (Thailand) Sonchat Ratiwatana
- Runners-up: (Chinese Taipei) Hsieh Cheng-peng (Indonesia) Christopher Rungkat
- Score: 6–2, 6–7^{(5–7)}, [10–6]

Events
| Singles | men | women |
| Doubles | men | women |
| ← 2016 · | Pingshan Open | · 2018 → |

Luke Saville and Jordan Thompson were the defending champions but chose not to defend their title.

Sanchai and Sonchat Ratiwatana won the title after defeating Hsieh Cheng-peng and Christopher Rungkat 6–2, 6–7^{(5–7)}, [10–6] in the final.

== Seeds ==
1. (Germany) Andre Begemann / (Belarus) Aliaksandr Bury (quarterfinals)
2. (Thailand) Sanchai Ratiwatana / (Thailand) Sonchat Ratiwatana (champions)
3. (Croatia) Dino Marcan / (Austria) Tristan-Samuel Weissborn (semifinals)
4. (Czech Republic) Roman Jebavý / (Slovakia) Igor Zelenay (first round)

== Draw ==
=== Key ===
- Q = Qualifier
- WC = Wild card
- LL = Lucky loser
- Alt = Alternate
- SE = Special exempt
- PR = Protected ranking
- ITF = ITF entry
- JE = Junior exempt
- w/o = Walkover
- r = Retired
- d = Defaulted
- SR = Special ranking

First round
1 | (Germany) A Begemann (Belarus) A Bury | 6 | 5 | [11]
WC | (China) Y Bai (China) C Wang | 3 | 7 | [9]
(Italy) T Fabbiano (Chinese Taipei) H-y Peng | 6^{5} | 6 | [7]
Alt | (Japan) T Matsui (Japan) Y Sugita | 7^{7} | 4 | [10]
4 | (Czech Republic) R Jebavý (Slovakia) I Zelenay | 4 | 6 | [7]
(Chinese Taipei) C-p Hsieh (Indonesia) C Rungkat | 6 | 3 | [10]
(Spain) R Carballés Baena (Spain) E López-Pérez | 3 | 6^{1}
PR | (Serbia) I Bozoljac (South Africa) R Roelofse | 6 | 7^{7}
WC | (China) D Wu (China) Zh Zhang | 7^{7} | 3 | [9]
(South Korea) D-h Lee (Chinese Taipei) C-h Yi | 6^{4} | 6 | [11]
PR | (India) Y Bhambri (India) J Nedunchezhiyan | 3 | 4
3 | (Croatia) D Marcan (Austria) T-S Weissborn | 6 | 6
PR | (Germany) G Kretschmer (Germany) A Satschko | 6 | 7^{7}
WC | (China) Chen Long (China) Li Jianhui | 4 | 6^{1}
(Croatia) A Šančić (Croatia) F Škugor | 6^{4} | 4
2 | (Thailand) Sa Ratiwatana (Thailand) So Ratiwatana | 7^{7} | 6

Quarterfinals
1 | (Germany) A Begemann (Belarus) A Bury | 6^{1} | 6 | [7]
Alt | (Japan) T Matsui (Japan) Y Sugita | 7^{7} | 3 | [10]
(Chinese Taipei) C-p Hsieh (Indonesia) C Rungkat | 6 | 6
PR | (Serbia) I Bozoljac (South Africa) R Roelofse | 4 | 2
(South Korea) D-h Lee (Chinese Taipei) C-h Yi | 2 | 2
3 | (Croatia) D Marcan (Austria) T-S Weissborn | 6 | 6
PR | (Germany) G Kretschmer (Germany) A Satschko | 4 | 2
2 | (Thailand) Sa Ratiwatana (Thailand) So Ratiwatana | 6 | 6

Semifinals
Alt | (Japan) T Matsui (Japan) Y Sugita | 6^{2} | 3
(Chinese Taipei) C-p Hsieh (Indonesia) C Rungkat | 7^{7} | 6
3 | (Croatia) D Marcan (Austria) T-S Weissborn | 6^{5} | 6 | [3]
2 | (Thailand) Sa Ratiwatana (Thailand) So Ratiwatana | 7^{7} | 4 | [10]

Final
(Chinese Taipei) C-p Hsieh (Indonesia) C Rungkat | 2 | 7^{7} | [6]
2 | (Thailand) Sa Ratiwatana (Thailand) So Ratiwatana | 6 | 6^{5} | [10]
