= 2019 Pingshan Open – Men's singles =

Men's singles
- 2019 Pingshan Open

Final
- Champion: (Cyprus) Marcos Baghdatis
- Runner-up: (Italy) Stefano Napolitano
- Score: 6–2, 3–6, 6–4

Events
Singles	men	women
Doubles	men	women
← 2018 ·	Pingshan Open	· 2020 →

Ilya Ivashka was the defending champion but chose not to defend his title.

Marcos Baghdatis won the title after defeating Stefano Napolitano 6–2, 3–6, 6–4 in the final.

== Seeds ==
All seeds receive a bye into the second round.

1. (Canada) Brayden Schnur (semifinals)
2. (Cyprus) Marcos Baghdatis (champion)
3. (Germany) Oscar Otte (third round)
4. (Australia) James Duckworth (second round)
5. (South Korea) Kwon Soon-woo (quarterfinals)
6. (Japan) Hiroki Moriya (second round)
7. (Japan) Yūichi Sugita (second round)
8. (United Kingdom) James Ward (second round)
9. (Germany) Rudolf Molleker (second round)
10. (Spain) Alejandro Davidovich Fokina (second round)
11. (Israel) Dudi Sela (second round, retired)
12. (Germany) Mats Moraing (second round, retired)
13. (Italy) Lorenzo Giustino (third round)
14. (Kazakhstan) Aleksandr Nedovyesov (third round)
15. (Slovenia) Blaž Rola (third round)
16. (China) Zhang Ze (second round)

== Draw ==
=== Key ===
- Q = Qualifier
- WC = Wild card
- LL = Lucky loser
- Alt = Alternate
- SE = Special exempt
- PR = Protected ranking
- ITF = ITF entry
- JE = Junior exempt
- w/o = Walkover
- r = Retired
- d = Defaulted
- SR = Special ranking

=== Finals ===
Quarterfinals
1	(Canada) Brayden Schnur	6	4	7
(South Korea) Lee Duck-hee	4	6	5
(Spain) Enrique López Pérez	4	4
(Italy) Stefano Napolitano	6	6
(Australia) Marc Polmans	3	1
ITF	(France) Baptiste Crepatte	6	6
5	(South Korea) Kwon Soon-woo	4	6	3
2	(Cyprus) Marcos Baghdatis	6	3	6

Semifinals
1	(Canada) Brayden Schnur	3	4
(Italy) Stefano Napolitano	6	6
ITF	(France) Baptiste Crepatte	4	2
2	(Cyprus) Marcos Baghdatis	6	6

Final
(Italy) Stefano Napolitano	2	6	4
2	(Cyprus) Marcos Baghdatis	6	3	6

=== Top half ===
==== Section 1 ====
First round
(India) S Myneni	2	6^{5}
(Dominican Republic) J Hernández-Fernández	6	7^{7}
(Argentina) P Cachin	4	4
ITF	(Spain) J Barranco Cosano	6	6
WC	(China) Zh Zhang	2	3
(China) Z Li	6	6
WC	(China) Xia Zihao	3	1
(South Korea) D-h Lee	6	6

Second round
1	(Canada) B Schnur	3	6	6
(Dominican Republic) J Hernández-Fernández	6	0	4
ITF	(Spain) J Barranco Cosano	3	4
13	(Italy) L Giustino	6	6
11	(Israel) D Sela	4^{r}
(China) Z Li	2
(South Korea) D-h Lee	6	6
7	(Japan) Y Sugita	3	4

Third round
1	(Canada) B Schnur	4	7	6
13	(Italy) L Giustino	6	5	2
(China) Z Li	3	3
(South Korea) D-h Lee	6	6

Quarterfinals
1	(Canada) B Schnur	6	4	7
(South Korea) D-h Lee	4	6	5

==== Section 2 ====
First round
(Spain) E López Pérez	6	6
Q	(Northern Mariana Islands) C Sinclair	2	4
ITF	(Italy) R Brancaccio	6^{5}	3
(Japan) G Soeda	7^{7}	6
(South Korea) Y-s Chung	6	6
(Egypt) M Safwat	3	1
(Italy) S Napolitano	6	6
WC	(China) Y Wu	4	4

Second round
4	(Australia) J Duckworth	4	2
(Spain) E López Pérez	6	6
(Japan) G Soeda	4	3
15	(Slovenia) B Rola	6	6
9	(Germany) R Molleker	4	1
(South Korea) Y-s Chung	6	6
(Italy) S Napolitano	6	7
8	(United Kingdom) J Ward	4	5

Third round
(Spain) E López Pérez	3	6	6
15	(Slovenia) B Rola	6	3	4
(South Korea) Y-s Chung	7	2	6^{4}
(Italy) S Napolitano	5	6	7^{7}

Quarterfinals
(Spain) E López Pérez	4	4
(Italy) S Napolitano	6	6

=== Bottom half ===
==== Section 3 ====
First round
(France) M Bourgue	6	6
(Canada) F Peliwo	1	3
ITF	(Egypt) K-M Maamoun	5	6	3
(Australia) M Polmans	7	4	6
(Russia) E Karlovskiy	3	4
ITF	(France) Baptiste Crepatte	6	6
WC	(China) D Wu	3	4
(Australia) M Banes	6	6

Second round
6	(Japan) H Moriya	1	1
(France) M Bourgue	6	6
(Australia) M Polmans	6	2	6
10	(Spain) A Davidovich Fokina	3	6	3
16	(China) Ze Zhang	6^{7}	4
ITF	(France) B Crepatte	7^{9}	6
(Australia) M Banes	2	2
3	(Germany) O Otte	6	6

Third round
(France) M Bourgue	7^{14}	4	6^{6}
(Australia) M Polmans	6^{12}	6	7^{8}
ITF	(France) B Crepatte	6	4	6
3	(Germany) O Otte	4	6	4

Quarterfinals
(Australia) M Polmans	3	1
ITF	(France) B Crepatte	6	6

==== Section 4 ====
First round
(Croatia) N Serdarušić	2	4
(Belarus) U Ignatik	6	6
(Brazil) G Clezar	6^{3}	6^{3}
(Australia) M Purcell	7^{7}	7^{7}
Q	(Russia) E Tiurnev	5	6	3
(Croatia) V Galović	7	4	6
WC	(China) Y He	3	2
(India) S Mukund	6	6

Second round
5	(South Korea) S-w Kwon	6	7
(Belarus) U Ignatik	3	5
(Australia) M Purcell	4
12	(Germany) M Moraing	3^{r}
14	(Kazakhstan) A Nedovyesov	6	6
(Croatia) V Galović	4	4
(India) S Mukund	4	5
2	(Cyprus) M Baghdatis	6	7

Third round
5	(South Korea) S-w Kwon	6	6
(Australia) M Purcell	3	3
14	(Kazakhstan) A Nedovyesov	3	2
2	(Cyprus) M Baghdatis	6	6

Quarterfinals
5	(South Korea) S-w Kwon	4	6	3
2	(Cyprus) M Baghdatis	6	3	6
