= 2015 Gemdale ATP Challenger China International Shenzhen – Singles =

Singles
- 2015 Gemdale ATP Challenger China International Shenzhen

Final
- Champion: (Slovenia) Blaž Kavčič
- Runner-up: (Brazil) André Ghem
- Score: 7–5, 6–4

Events
Singles	Doubles
← 2014 ·	Gemdale ATP Challenger China International Shenzhen	· 2016 →

Gilles Müller was the defending champion, but chose not to participate.

Blaž Kavčič won the title, defeating André Ghem in the final, 7–5, 6–4.

== Seeds ==
1. (Slovenia) Blaž Kavčič (champion)
2. (Kazakhstan) Aleksandr Nedovyesov (quarterfinals)
3. (Russia) Alexander Kudryavtsev (quarterfinals)
4. (Australia) John Millman (first round)
5. (Japan) Yūichi Sugita (second round)
6. (Japan) Hiroki Moriya (first round)
7. (Spain) Roberto Carballés Baena (first round)
8. (Hungary) Márton Fucsovics (second round)

== Draw ==
=== Key ===
- Q = Qualifier
- WC = Wild card
- LL = Lucky loser
- Alt = Alternate
- SE = Special exempt
- PR = Protected ranking
- ITF = ITF entry
- JE = Junior exempt
- w/o = Walkover
- r = Retired
- d = Defaulted
- SR = Special ranking

=== Finals ===
Semifinals
1	(Slovenia) Blaž Kavčič	6^{6}	7^{7}	6
(Spain) Daniel Muñoz de la Nava	7^{8}	6^{5}	4
(Brazil) André Ghem	2	6	6
Q	(India) Sanam Singh	6	3	3

Final
1	(Slovenia) Blaž Kavčič	7	6
(Brazil) André Ghem	5	4

=== Top half ===
First round
1	(Slovenia) B Kavčič	6	6
WC	(China) Z Li	2	4
(Chinese Taipei) T Chen	6	3	6^{5}
Q	(Germany) R Becker	4	6	7^{7}
(Belgium) K Coppejans	4	6
(France) T Lamasine	6	7
WC	(China) C Wang	1	4
8	(Hungary) M Fucsovics	6	6
4	(Australia) J Millman	3	5
(Spain) D Muñoz de la Nava	6	7
Q	(Chinese Taipei) T-h Yang	7^{7}	6
Q	(Japan) Y Uchiyama	6^{2}	4
(Germany) N Langer	6^{5}	6^{6}
(Belarus) U Ignatik	7^{7}	7^{8}
WC	(China) X Gao	7	3	3
5	(Japan) Y Sugita	5	6	6

Second round
1	(Slovenia) B Kavčič	6^{4}	6	6
Q	(Germany) R Becker	7^{7}	4	4
(France) T Lamasine	6	7^{12}
8	(Hungary) M Fucsovics	5	6^{10}
(Spain) D Muñoz de la Nava	6	6
Q	(Chinese Taipei) T-h Yang	3	0
(Belarus) U Ignatik	6	6
5	(Japan) Y Sugita	4	4

Quarterfinals
1	(Slovenia) B Kavčič	3	6	6
(France) T Lamasine	6	2	1
(Spain) D Muñoz de la Nava	7^{7}	6
(Belarus) U Ignatik	6^{5}	1

Semifinals
1	(Slovenia) B Kavčič	6^{6}	7^{7}	6
(Spain) D Muñoz de la Nava	7^{8}	6^{5}	4

=== Bottom half ===
First round
6	(Japan) H Moriya	3	6	3
(Brazil) A Ghem	6	3	6
WC	(China) D Wu	1
(Italy) R Marcora	0^{r}
(Australia) J Thompson	4
(Australia) B Mitchell	0^{r}
(Chinese Taipei) L-c Huang	3	5
3	(Russia) A Kudryavtsev	6	7
7	(Spain) R Carballés Baena	3	6	3
Q	(India) S Singh	6	3	6
(Bosnia and Herzegovina) A Šetkić	6	6
(Germany) P Torebko	1	0
(India) S Devvarman	6	4	6^{5}
(China) Z Zhang	4	6	7^{7}
(India) S Myneni	3	6	4
2	(Kazakhstan) A Nedovyesov	6	4	6

Second round
(Brazil) A Ghem	6	6
WC	(China) D Wu	2	2
(Australia) J Thompson	6	6^{11}	1
3	(Russia) A Kudryavtsev	3	7^{13}	6
Q	(India) S Singh	6	6
(Bosnia and Herzegovina) A Šetkić	3	3
(China) Z Zhang	6	4	1
2	(Kazakhstan) A Nedovyesov	4	6	6

Quarterfinals
(Brazil) A Ghem	6	6
3	(Russia) A Kudryavtsev	3	3
Q	(India) S Singh	6	6
2	(Kazakhstan) A Nedovyesov	4	2

Semifinals
(Brazil) A Ghem	2	6	6
Q	(India) S Singh	6	3	3
