= 2017 Pingshan Open – Women's doubles =

Women's doubles
- 2017 Pingshan Open

Final
- Champions: (Ukraine) Lyudmyla Kichenok (Ukraine) Nadiia Kichenok
- Runners-up: (Japan) Eri Hozumi (Russia) Valeria Savinykh
- Score: 6–4, 6–4

Events
Singles	men	women
Doubles	men	women
← 2016 ·	Pingshan Open	· 2018 →

Shuko Aoyama and Makoto Ninomiya were the defending champions, but Aoyama chose not to participate. Ninomiya partnered Akiko Omae, and lost in the quarterfinals to Eri Hozumi and Valeria Savinykh.

Lyudmyla and Nadiia Kichenok won the title after defeating Eri Hozumi and Valeria Savinykh 6–4, 6–4 in the final.

== Seeds ==
1. (Japan) Makoto Ninomiya / (Japan) Akiko Omae (quarterfinals)
2. (Ukraine) Lyudmyla Kichenok / (Ukraine) Nadiia Kichenok (champions)
3. (Netherlands) Lesley Kerkhove / (Belarus) Lidziya Marozava (semifinals)
4. (Australia) Jessica Moore / (Serbia) Nina Stojanović (first round)

== Draw ==
=== Key ===
- Q = Qualifier
- WC = Wild card
- LL = Lucky loser
- Alt = Alternate
- SE = Special exempt
- PR = Protected ranking
- ITF = ITF entry
- JE = Junior exempt
- w/o = Walkover
- r = Retired
- d = Defaulted
- SR = Special ranking

First round
1	(Japan) M Ninomiya (Japan) A Omae	6	6
(Israel) J Glushko (Poland) P Kania	3	2
(Japan) E Hozumi (Russia) V Savinykh	6	6
WC	(China) Y Liu (China) X Sun	2	1
4	(Australia) J Moore (Serbia) N Stojanović	4	5
(Poland) K Piter (Belgium) M Zanevska	6	7
WC	(China) J Chen (China) H Tang	3	2
(Netherlands) A Rus (Switzerland) A Sadiković	6	6
(Chinese Taipei) C-w Chan (China) J Lu	4	6	[12]
(Turkey) I Soylu (Czech Republic) B Štefková	6	2	[14]
(Japan) K Takahata (United Kingdom) E Webley-Smith	4	4
3	(Netherlands) L Kerkhove (Belarus) L Marozava	6	6
(France) A Hesse (Japan) H Kuwata	6	6
WC	(China) L Kong (China) L Zhao	1	1
(Russia) K Lykina (Japan) R Sawayanagi	1	3
2	(Ukraine) L Kichenok (Ukraine) N Kichenok	6	6

Quarterfinals
1	(Japan) M Ninomiya (Japan) A Omae	5	4
(Japan) E Hozumi (Russia) V Savinykh	7	6
(Poland) K Piter (Belgium) M Zanevska	6	6
(Netherlands) A Rus (Switzerland) A Sadiković	4	4
(Turkey) I Soylu (Czech Republic) B Štefková	3	5
3	(Netherlands) L Kerkhove (Belarus) L Marozava	6	7
(France) A Hesse (Japan) H Kuwata	0	1
2	(Ukraine) L Kichenok (Ukraine) N Kichenok	6	6

Semifinals
(Japan) E Hozumi (Russia) V Savinykh	7	6
(Poland) K Piter (Belgium) M Zanevska	5	2
3	(Netherlands) L Kerkhove (Belarus) L Marozava	6^{2}	6	[6]
2	(Ukraine) L Kichenok (Ukraine) N Kichenok	7^{7}	2	[10]

Final
(Japan) E Hozumi (Russia) V Savinykh	4	4
2	(Ukraine) L Kichenok (Ukraine) N Kichenok	6	6
