= 2018 Pingshan Open – Women's singles =

Women's singles
- 2018 Pingshan Open

Final
- Champion: (Slovakia) Viktória Kužmová
- Runner-up: (Russia) Anna Kalinskaya
- Score: 7–5, 6–3

Events
| Singles | men | women |
| Doubles | men | women |
| ← 2017 · | Pingshan Open | · 2019 → |

Ekaterina Alexandrova was the defending champion, but chose not to participate.

Viktória Kužmová won the title, defeating Anna Kalinskaya in the final, 7–5, 6–3.

== Seeds ==
1. (Czech Republic) Denisa Allertová (quarterfinals)
2. (Thailand) Luksika Kumkhum (quarterfinals)
3. (Slovakia) Viktória Kužmová (champion)
4. (Japan) Nao Hibino (first round)
5. (China) Zheng Saisai (quarterfinals)
6. (Montenegro) Danka Kovinić (first round)
7. (Russia) Anna Blinkova (semifinals)
8. (Slovakia) Anna Karolína Schmiedlová (second round)

== Draw ==
=== Key ===
- Q = Qualifier
- WC = Wild card
- LL = Lucky loser
- Alt = Alternate
- SE = Special exempt
- PR = Protected ranking
- ITF = ITF entry
- JE = Junior exempt
- w/o = Walkover
- r = Retired
- d = Defaulted
- SR = Special ranking

=== Finals ===
Semifinals
7 | (Russia) Anna Blinkova | 6 | 3 | 4
3 | (Slovakia) Viktória Kužmová | 3 | 6 | 6
(Russia) Anna Kalinskaya | 6 | 6
SE | (Ukraine) Marta Kostyuk | 2 | 2

Final
3 | (Slovakia) Viktória Kužmová | 7 | 6
(Russia) Anna Kalinskaya | 5 | 3

=== Top half ===
First round
1 | (Czech Republic) D Allertová | 6 | 2 | 6
(Netherlands) L Kerkhove | 3 | 6 | 2
WC | (China) Y Yuan | 3 | 0
(Russia) V Diatchenko | 6 | 6
JE | (China) Xin Wang | 7 | 4 | 4
SE | (Belgium) M Zanevska | 5 | 6 | 6
WC | (China) S Ma | 2 | 0
7 | (Russia) A Blinkova | 6 | 6
3 | (Slovakia) V Kužmová | 6 | 6
(Japan) R Ozaki | 4 | 2
(Slovenia) D Jakupović | 7 | 6
Q | (Uzbekistan) S Sharipova | 5 | 0
(Italy) D Chiesa | 6^{10} | 6 | 6
(Australia) L Cabrera | 7^{12} | 1 | 2
(China) F Liu | 3 | 7 | 2
5 | (China) S Zheng | 6 | 5 | 6

Second round
1 | (Czech Republic) D Allertová | 6 | 0 | 6
(Russia) V Diatchenko | 2 | 6 | 4
SE | (Belgium) M Zanevska | 2^{r}
7 | (Russia) A Blinkova | 4
3 | (Slovakia) V Kužmová | 6 | 5 | 6
(Slovenia) D Jakupović | 4 | 7 | 3
(Italy) D Chiesa | 6^{2} | 6 | 3
5 | (China) S Zheng | 7^{7} | 1 | 6

Quarterfinals
1 | (Czech Republic) D Allertová | 7^{7} | 5 | 1
7 | (Russia) A Blinkova | 6^{3} | 7 | 6
3 | (Slovakia) V Kužmová | 6 | 6
5 | (China) S Zheng | 1 | 1

Semifinals
7 | (Russia) A Blinkova | 6 | 3 | 4
3 | (Slovakia) V Kužmová | 3 | 6 | 6

=== Bottom half ===
First round
8 | (Slovakia) AK Schmiedlová | 6 | 6
Q | (China) X Gao | 3 | 1
(Romania) A Cadanțu | 6^{4} | 7^{7} | 6
(Japan) M Kato | 7^{7} | 6^{4} | 4
(Russia) P Monova | 3 | 6 | 6
Q | (Poland) U Radwańska | 6 | 3 | 4
(Russia) A Kalinskaya | 3 | 7 | 6
4 | (Japan) N Hibino | 6 | 5 | 3
6 | (Montenegro) D Kovinić | 5 | 4
WC | (China) F Xun | 7 | 6
SE | (Ukraine) M Kostyuk | 0 | 7 | 6
Q | (Serbia) I Jorović | 6 | 5 | 4
(China) Jin Lu | 3 | 2
(Italy) J Paolini | 6 | 6
WC | (China) M Guo | 1 | 3
2 | (Thailand) L Kumkhum | 6 | 6

Second round
8 | (Slovakia) AK Schmiedlová | 1 | 4
(Romania) A Cadanțu | 6 | 6
(Russia) P Monova | 1^{r}
(Russia) A Kalinskaya | 2
WC | (China) F Xun | 2 | 6 | 4
SE | (Ukraine) M Kostyuk | 6 | 1 | 6
(Italy) J Paolini | 4 | 2
2 | (Thailand) L Kumkhum | 6 | 6

Quarterfinals
(Romania) A Cadanțu | 2 | 1
(Russia) A Kalinskaya | 6 | 6
SE | (Ukraine) M Kostyuk | 1 | 7^{7} | 6
2 | (Thailand) L Kumkhum | 6 | 6^{4} | 2

Semifinals
(Russia) A Kalinskaya | 6 | 6
SE | (Ukraine) M Kostyuk | 2 | 2
