= 2019 Pingshan Open – Women's doubles =

Women's doubles
- 2019 Pingshan Open

Final
- Champions: (Chinese Taipei) Liang En-shuo (China) Xun Fangying
- Runners-up: (Japan) Hiroko Kuwata (Uzbekistan) Sabina Sharipova
- Score: 6–4, 6–1

Events
Singles	men	women
Doubles	men	women
← 2018 ·	Pingshan Open	· 2020 →

Anna Kalinskaya and Viktória Kužmová were the defending champions, but chose not to participate.

Liang En-shuo and Xun Fangying won the title, defeating Hiroko Kuwata and Sabina Sharipova in the final, 6–4, 6–1.

== Seeds ==
1. (China) Jiang Xinyu / (China) Tang Qianhui (first round)
2. (South Korea) Choi Ji-hee / (China) Lu Jingjing (semifinals)
3. (Indonesia) Beatrice Gumulya / (China) You Xiaodi (first round)
4. (China) Feng Shuo / (China) Kang Jiaqi (first round)

== Draw ==
=== Key ===
- Q = Qualifier
- WC = Wild card
- LL = Lucky loser
- Alt = Alternate
- SE = Special exempt
- PR = Protected ranking
- ITF = ITF entry
- JE = Junior exempt
- w/o = Walkover
- r = Retired
- d = Defaulted
- SR = Special ranking

=== Draw ===
First round
1	(China) X Jiang (China) Q Tang	1	5
(China) H Guo (Japan) H Kaji	6	7
WC	(China) X Sun (China) D Wang	6	7^{7}
WC	(China) S Cao (China) W Zheng	1	6^{5}
4	(China) S Feng (China) J Kang	6	5	[3]
(Australia) K Birrell (Israel) J Glushko	4	7	[10]
WC	(China) M Wang (China) M Wu	2	3
(Chinese Taipei) E-s Liang (China) F Xun	6	6
(Japan) H Kuwata (Uzbekistan) S Sharipova	6	6
(China) Jia Lu (China) S Ma	2	3
(Turkey) B Cengiz (Indonesia) J Rompies	6	7
3	(Indonesia) B Gumulya (China) X You	4	5
(France) A Hesse (India) A Raina	6	6
(Romania) A Cadanțu (Slovakia) J Čepelová	3	2
(Poland) M Fręch (India) P Thombare	4	5
2	(South Korea) J-h Choi (China) Jin Lu	6	7

Quarterfinals
(China) H Guo (Japan) H Kaji	7^{7}	7
WC	(China) X Sun (China) D Wang	6^{3}	5
(Australia) K Birrell (Israel) J Glushko	6	3	[5]
(Chinese Taipei) E-s Liang (China) F Xun	4	6	[10]
(Japan) H Kuwata (Uzbekistan) S Sharipova	4	6	[10]
(Turkey) B Cengiz (Indonesia) J Rompies	6	4	[8]
(France) A Hesse (India) A Raina	4	5
2	(South Korea) J-h Choi (China) Jin Lu	6	7

Semifinals
(China) H Guo (Japan) H Kaji
(Chinese Taipei) E-s Liang (China) F Xun	w/o
(Japan) H Kuwata (Uzbekistan) S Sharipova	1	6	[10]
2	(South Korea) J-h Choi (China) Jin Lu	6	3	[8]

Final
(Chinese Taipei) E-s Liang (China) F Xun	6	6
(Japan) H Kuwata (Uzbekistan) S Sharipova	4	1
