= 2014 Gemdale ATP Challenger – Doubles =

Doubles
- 2014 Gemdale ATP Challenger

Final
- Champions: (Australia) Samuel Groth (Australia) Chris Guccione
- Runners-up: (Germany) Dominik Meffert (Germany) Tim Puetz
- Score: 6–3, 7–6^{(7–5)}

Events
Singles	Doubles
- Gemdale ATP Challenger

This was the first edition of the tournament.

Groth and Guccione won the title, defeating Dominik Meffert and Tim Puetz in the final, 6–3, 7–6^{(7–5)}.

== Seeds ==
1. (Australia) Samuel Groth / (Australia) Chris Guccione (champions)
2. (Thailand) Sanchai Ratiwatana / (Thailand) Sonchat Ratiwatana (first round)
3. (Australia) Alex Bolt / (Australia) Andrew Whittington (quarterfinals)
4. (Russia) Victor Baluda / (Russia) Konstantin Kravchuk (quarterfinals)

== Draw ==
Key

- Q = Qualifier
- WC = Wild card
- LL = Lucky loser
- Alt = Alternate
- ITF = ITF entry
- PR = Protected ranking
- SR = Special ranking
- SE = Special exempt
- JE = Junior exempt
- JR = Junior Accelerator Programme entrant
- CO = College Accelerator Programme entrant
- NG = Next Gen Accelerator Program entrant
- w/o = Walkover
- r = Retired
- d = Defaulted

=== Draw ===
First round
1	(Australia) S Groth (Australia) C Guccione	6	7
(Japan) T Ito (Japan) H Moriya	2	5
(Slovakia) L Lacko (Slovenia) G Žemlja	2	6	[7]
(Japan) G Soeda (Japan) Y Uchiyama	6	4	[10]
4	(Russia) V Baluda (Russia) K Kravchuk	3	6	[10]
(Chinese Taipei) T Chen (Republic of Ireland) J Cluskey	6	3	[4]
WC	(United Kingdom) D Cox (China) D Wu	3	6	[5]
(Japan) Y Sugita (Thailand) D Udomchoke	6	3	[10]
WC	(China) M Gong (China) Z Zhang	3	1
(United Kingdom) J Delgado (Luxembourg) G Müller	6	6
Q	(Chinese Taipei) H-h Lee (Australia) M Reid	6	3	[8]
3	(Australia) A Bolt (Australia) A Whittington	4	6	[10]
WC	(China) Liu Xiyu (China) C Wang	4	5
(Germany) D Meffert (Germany) T Puetz	6	7
(India) S Myneni (Chinese Taipei) H-y Peng	6^{5}	7^{8}	[12]
2	(Thailand) Sa Ratiwatana (Thailand) So Ratiwatana	7^{7}	6^{6}	[10]

Quarterfinals
1	(Australia) S Groth (Australia) C Guccione	7^{7}	6
(Japan) G Soeda (Japan) Y Uchiyama	6^{2}	2
4	(Russia) V Baluda (Russia) K Kravchuk	6^{4}	0
(Japan) Y Sugita (Thailand) D Udomchoke	7^{7}	6
(United Kingdom) J Delgado (Luxembourg) G Müller	7^{9}	2	[10]
3	(Australia) A Bolt (Australia) A Whittington	6^{7}	6	[5]
(Germany) D Meffert (Germany) T Puetz	6	7^{8}
(India) S Myneni (Chinese Taipei) H-y Peng	3	6^{6}

Semifinals
1	(Australia) S Groth (Australia) C Guccione	7^{7}	6
(Japan) Y Sugita (Thailand) D Udomchoke	6^{2}	2
(United Kingdom) J Delgado (Luxembourg) G Müller	2	6	[12]
(Germany) D Meffert (Germany) T Puetz	6	3	[14]

Final
1	(Australia) S Groth (Australia) C Guccione	6	7^{7}
(Germany) D Meffert (Germany) T Puetz	3	6^{5}
