= 2019 Pingshan Open – Women's singles =

Women's singles
- 2019 Pingshan Open

Final
- Champion: (Denmark) Clara Tauson
- Runner-up: (China) Liu Fangzhou
- Score: 6–4, 6–3

Events
Singles	men	women
Doubles	men	women
← 2018 ·	Pingshan Open	· 2020 →

Viktória Kužmová was the defending champion, but chose not to participate.

Clara Tauson won the title, defeating Liu Fangzhou in the final, 6–4, 6–3.

== Seeds ==
1. (Israel) Julia Glushko (second round)
2. (Uzbekistan) Sabina Sharipova (second round)
3. (Australia) Kimberly Birrell (first round)
4. (China) Han Xinyun (first round)
5. (India) Ankita Raina (second round)
6. (China) Liu Fangzhou (final)
7. (Poland) Magdalena Fręch (quarterfinals)
8. (China) Lu Jiajing (semifinals)

== Draw ==
=== Key ===
- Q = Qualifier
- WC = Wild card
- LL = Lucky loser
- Alt = Alternate
- SE = Special exempt
- PR = Protected ranking
- ITF = ITF entry
- JE = Junior exempt
- w/o = Walkover
- r = Retired
- d = Defaulted
- SR = Special ranking

=== Finals ===
Semifinals
8	(China) Lu Jiajing	3	6^{11}
JE	(Denmark) Clara Tauson	6	7^{13}
6	(China) Liu Fangzhou	6	6
(Japan) Hiroko Kuwata	2	0

Final
JE	(Denmark) Clara Tauson	6	6
6	(China) Liu Fangzhou	4	3

=== Top half ===
First round
1	(Israel) J Glushko	6	6
(China) Jin Lu	2	3
(Romania) A Cadanțu	7	1	7^{7}
WC	(China) Y Yuan	5	6	6^{5}
(Israel) D Khazaniuk	6	7
(Japan) H Kaji	3	5
(France) A Hesse	2	6	5
8	(China) Jia Lu	6	4	7
4	(China) X Han	5	2
(Slovakia) J Čepelová	7	6
JE	(Denmark) C Tauson	6	6
(Chinese Taipei) E-s Liang	1	2
(France) H Tan	0	6	2
WC	(China) S Ma	6	1	6
WC	(China) M Guo	1	3
7	(Poland) M Fręch	6	6

Second round
1	(Israel) J Glushko	4	6	0
(Romania) A Cadanțu	6	3	6
(Israel) D Khazaniuk	2	1
8	(China) Jia Lu	6	6
(Slovakia) J Čepelová	7	6^{5}	1
JE	(Denmark) C Tauson	5	7^{7}	6
WC	(China) S Ma	2	1
7	(Poland) M Fręch	6	6

Quarterfinals
(Romania) A Cadanțu	5	6	3
8	(China) Jia Lu	7	1	6
JE	(Denmark) C Tauson	7	0	6
7	(Poland) M Fręch	5	6	3

Semifinals
8	(China) Jia Lu	3	6^{11}
JE	(Denmark) C Tauson	6	7^{13}

=== Bottom half ===
First round
6	(China) F Liu	6	6
(Australia) A Myers	4	2
(South Korea) S-j Jang	3	6	3
Q	(Japan) K Okamura	6	4	6
(China) F Xun	3	6	7^{7}
Q	(China) X You	6	2	6^{1}
(China) Y Zhang	2	6	7
3	(Australia) K Birrell	6	4	5
5	(India) A Raina	6	3	6
Q	(China) S Feng	4	6	3
Q	(Japan) C Muramatsu	6	2	5
(Japan) H Kuwata	2	6	7
Q	(Germany) S-R Sekulic	7	6
Q	(China) Y Ma	5	1
WC	(China) M Wu	4	1
2	(Uzbekistan) S Sharipova	6	6

Second round
6	(China) F Liu	6	7^{7}
Q	(Japan) K Okamura	1	6^{2}
(China) F Xun	7^{7}	4	7^{8}
(China) Y Zhang	6^{2}	6	6^{6}
5	(India) A Raina	6^{2}	2
(Japan) H Kuwata	7^{7}	6
Q	(Germany) S-R Sekulic	6	6
2	(Uzbekistan) S Sharipova	3	2

Quarterfinals
6	(China) F Liu	6	6
(China) F Xun	4	4
(Japan) H Kuwata	3	6	6
Q	(Germany) S-R Sekulic	6	4	0

Semifinals
6	(China) F Liu	6	6
(Japan) H Kuwata	2	0
