= 2018 Pingshan Open – Women's doubles =

Women's doubles
- 2018 Pingshan Open

Final
- Champions: (Russia) Anna Kalinskaya (Slovakia) Viktória Kužmová
- Runners-up: (Montenegro) Danka Kovinić (China) Wang Xinyu
- Score: 6–4, 1–6, [10–7]

Events
Singles	men	women
Doubles	men	women
← 2017 ·	Pingshan Open	· 2019 →

Lyudmyla and Nadiia Kichenok were the defending champions, but they chose to compete at the 2018 BNP Paribas Open instead.

Anna Kalinskaya and Viktória Kužmová won the title after defeating Danka Kovinić and Wang Xinyu 6–4, 1–6, [10–7] in the final.

== Seeds ==
1. (Australia) Priscilla Hon / (Slovenia) Dalila Jakupović (semifinals)
2. (China) Jiang Xinyu / (China) Tang Qianhui (quarterfinals)
3. (China) Lu Jingjing / (India) Prarthana Thombare (first round)
4. (Romania) Alexandra Cadanțu / (Slovakia) Chantal Škamlová (first round)

== Draw ==
=== Key ===
- Q = Qualifier
- WC = Wild card
- LL = Lucky loser
- Alt = Alternate
- SE = Special exempt
- PR = Protected ranking
- ITF = ITF entry
- JE = Junior exempt
- w/o = Walkover
- r = Retired
- d = Defaulted
- SR = Special ranking

=== Draw ===
First round
1	(Australia) P Hon (Slovenia) D Jakupović	6	6
WC	(China) Y Liu (China) Y Yuan	3	1
(Chinese Taipei) S-y Hsieh (China) Q Ye	6	7^{7}
(China) X Gao (China) F Xun	3	6^{5}
4	(Romania) A Cadanțu (Slovakia) C Škamlová	7	3	[5]
(Russia) A Kalinskaya (Slovakia) V Kužmová	5	6	[10]
(Greece) V Grammatikopoulou (Russia) P Monova	2	3
(Australia) L Cabrera (Thailand) L Kumkhum	6	6
WC	(China) M Wang (China) J Zang	6	6
(China) Jiax Lu (China) W Zheng	1	3
(Indonesia) B Gumulya (China) X You	7	6
3	(China) Jin Lu (India) P Thombare	5	4
(Montenegro) D Kovinić (China) Xin Wang	2	6	[10]
(China) H Guo (China) X Sun	6	2	[7]
(Germany) A Zaja (Belgium) K Zimmermann	6	4	[8]
2	(China) X Jiang (China) Q Tang	3	6	[10]

Quarterfinals
1	(Australia) P Hon (Slovenia) D Jakupović	6	4	[10]
(Chinese Taipei) S-y Hsieh (China) Q Ye	4	6	[2]
(Russia) A Kalinskaya (Slovakia) V Kužmová	6	6
(Australia) L Cabrera (Thailand) L Kumkhum	4	3
WC	(China) M Wang (China) J Zang	1	6^{1}
(Indonesia) B Gumulya (China) X You	6	7^{7}
(Montenegro) D Kovinić (China) Xin Wang	7^{8}	6
2	(China) X Jiang (China) Q Tang	6^{6}	2

Semifinals
1	(Australia) P Hon (Slovenia) D Jakupović	3	4
(Russia) A Kalinskaya (Slovakia) V Kužmová	6	6
(Indonesia) B Gumulya (China) X You	7^{7}	4	[5]
(Montenegro) D Kovinić (China) Xin Wang	6^{5}	6	[10]

Final
(Russia) A Kalinskaya (Slovakia) V Kužmová	6	1	[10]
(Montenegro) D Kovinić (China) Xin Wang	4	6	[7]
