= 2019 Pingshan Open – Men's doubles =

Men's doubles
- 2019 Pingshan Open

Final
- Champions: (Chinese Taipei) Hsieh Cheng-peng (Indonesia) Christopher Rungkat
- Runners-up: (China) Li Zhe (Portugal) Gonçalo Oliveira
- Score: 6–4, 3–6, [10–6]

Events
Singles	men	women
Doubles	men	women
- Pingshan Open

Hsieh Cheng-peng and Rameez Junaid were the defending champions but only Hsieh chose to defend his title, partnering Christopher Rungkat. Hsieh successfully defended his title.

Hsieh and Rungkat won the title after defeating Li Zhe and Gonçalo Oliveira 6–4, 3–6, [10–6] in the final.

== Seeds ==
1. (Chinese Taipei) Hsieh Cheng-peng / (Indonesia) Christopher Rungkat (champions)
2. (China) Gong Maoxin / (China) Zhang Ze (semifinals)
3. (Australia) Max Purcell / (Australia) Luke Saville (semifinals)
4. (India) Sriram Balaji / (Mexico) Hans Hach Verdugo (first round)

== Draw ==
Key

- Q = Qualifier
- WC = Wild card
- LL = Lucky loser
- Alt = Alternate
- ITF = ITF entry
- PR = Protected ranking
- SR = Special ranking
- SE = Special exempt
- JE = Junior exempt
- JR = Junior Accelerator Programme entrant
- CO = College Accelerator Programme entrant
- NG = Next Gen Accelerator Program entrant
- w/o = Walkover
- r = Retired
- d = Defaulted

First round
1	(Chinese Taipei) C-p Hsieh (Indonesia) C Rungkat	7	6
WC	(China) Y He (China) F Sun	5	2
(Philippines) R Gonzales (United States) A Lawson	7^{7}	4	[12]
WC	(China) R Hua (China) Xia Zihao	6^{3}	6	[10]
3	(Australia) M Purcell (Australia) L Saville	7	6^{4}	[10]
WC	(China) X Gao (China) Zh Zhang	5	7^{7}	[4]
(Finland) H Heliövaara (Chile) H Podlipnik Castillo	6	1	[10]
(Spain) E López Pérez (Thailand) Sa Ratiwatana	4	6	[5]
(Switzerland) L Margaroli (India) V Vardhan	6	6
ITF	(France) Baptiste Crepatte (Egypt) K-M Maamoun	2	4
(China) Z Li (Portugal) G Oliveira	6	6
4	(India) S Balaji (Mexico) H Hach Verdugo	3	4
ITF	(Spain) J Barranco Cosano (Italy) R Brancaccio	7^{7}	0	[5]
(Australia) M Polmans (Canada) B Schnur	6^{1}	6	[10]
(Japan) T Matsui (Japan) H Moriya	2	4
2	(China) M Gong (China) Ze Zhang	6	6

Quarterfinals
1	(Chinese Taipei) C-p Hsieh (Indonesia) C Rungkat	6	6
(Philippines) R Gonzales (United States) A Lawson	4	2
3	(Australia) M Purcell (Australia) L Saville	6^{4}	6	[10]
(Finland) H Heliövaara (Chile) H Podlipnik Castillo	7^{7}	4	[3]
(Switzerland) L Margaroli (India) V Vardhan	4	6	[6]
(China) Z Li (Portugal) G Oliveira	6	1	[10]
(Australia) M Polmans (Canada) B Schnur	6	4	[5]
2	(China) M Gong (China) Ze Zhang	4	6	[10]

Semifinals
1	(Chinese Taipei) C-p Hsieh (Indonesia) C Rungkat	6	7^{10}
3	(Australia) M Purcell (Australia) L Saville	3	6^{8}
(China) Z Li (Portugal) G Oliveira	4	7^{7}	[10]
2	(China) M Gong (China) Ze Zhang	6	6^{5}	[5]

Final
1	(Chinese Taipei) C-p Hsieh (Indonesia) C Rungkat	6	3	[10]
(China) Z Li (Portugal) G Oliveira	4	6	[6]
