= 2016 ITF Women's Circuit – Shenzhen – Doubles =

Shenzhen – Doubles
- 2016 ITF Women's Circuit – Shenzhen

Final
- Champions: (Japan) Shuko Aoyama (Japan) Makoto Ninomiya
- Runners-up: (China) Liang Chen (China) Wang Yafan
- Score: 7–6^{(7–5)}, 6–4

Events
Singles	Doubles
← 2015 ·	ITF Women's Circuit – Shenzhen	· 2017 →

Noppawan Lertcheewakarn and Lu Jiajing were the defending champions, but both players chose not to participate.

Shuko Aoyama and Makoto Ninomiya won the title, defeating Liang Chen and Wang Yafan in the final, 7–6^{(7–5)}, 6–4.

== Seeds ==
1. (China) Liang Chen / (China) Wang Yafan (final)
2. (Japan) Eri Hozumi / (Japan) Miyu Kato (quarterfinals)
3. (Japan) Shuko Aoyama / (Japan) Makoto Ninomiya (champions)
4. (Thailand) Varatchaya Wongteanchai / (China) Yang Zhaoxuan (semifinals)

== Draw ==
=== Key ===
- Q = Qualifier
- WC = Wild card
- LL = Lucky loser
- Alt = Alternate
- SE = Special exempt
- PR = Protected ranking
- ITF = ITF entry
- JE = Junior exempt
- w/o = Walkover
- r = Retired
- d = Defaulted
- SR = Special ranking

First round
1	(China) C Liang (China) Yaf Wang	6	6
(Slovenia) D Jakupović (China) Yan Wang	2	2
WC	(China) Jiax Lu (China) X Sun	4	7^{7}	[10]
(Japan) E Sema (India) P Thombare	6	6^{4}	[12]
4	(Thailand) V Wongteanchai (China) Z Yang	6	6
(Japan) H Kuwata (Japan) K Takahata	2	2
(China) R Tian (China) Q Ye	2	6	[8]
WC	(China) H Guo (China) Yuk Zhang	6	1	[10]
(Japan) M Ayukawa (Japan) A Okuno	2	3
(Japan) R Sawayanagi (China) L Zhu	6	6
WC	(China) J Chen (China) D Zhao	6	6^{5}	[3]
3	(Japan) S Aoyama (Japan) M Ninomiya	2	7^{7}	[10]
Alt	(Zimbabwe) V Bhunu (China) Y Yu	6	3	[9]
(Chinese Taipei) C-y Hsu (China) Jin Lu	1	6	[11]
(Russia) K Lykina (United Kingdom) E Webley-Smith	3	6	[4]
2	(Japan) E Hozumi (Japan) M Kato	6	1	[10]

Quarterfinals
1	(China) C Liang (China) Yaf Wang	7^{7}	6
(Japan) E Sema (India) P Thombare	6^{5}	2
4	(Thailand) V Wongteanchai (China) Z Yang	6	6
WC	(China) H Guo (China) Yuk Zhang	2	1
(Japan) R Sawayanagi (China) L Zhu	1	3
3	(Japan) S Aoyama (Japan) M Ninomiya	6	6
(Chinese Taipei) C-y Hsu (China) Jin Lu	6	6
2	(Japan) E Hozumi (Japan) M Kato	3	2

Semifinals
1	(China) C Liang (China) Yaf Wang	6	4	[10]
4	(Thailand) V Wongteanchai (China) Z Yang	1	6	[4]
3	(Japan) S Aoyama (Japan) M Ninomiya	6	6
(Chinese Taipei) C-y Hsu (China) Jin Lu	4	1

Final
1	(China) C Liang (China) Yaf Wang	6^{5}	4
3	(Japan) S Aoyama (Japan) M Ninomiya	7^{7}	6
