= 2016 ITF Women's Circuit – Shenzhen – Singles =

Shenzhen – Singles
- 2016 ITF Women's Circuit – Shenzhen

Final
- Champion: (China) Wang Qiang
- Runner-up: (Japan) Mayo Hibi
- Score: 6–2, 6–0

Events
Singles	Doubles
← 2015 ·	ITF Women's Circuit – Shenzhen	· 2017 →

Hsieh Su-wei was the defending champion, but chose to participate in Istanbul instead.

Wang Qiang won the title, defeating Mayo Hibi in the final, 6–2, 6–0.

== Seeds ==
1. (China) Wang Qiang (champion)
2. (China) Wang Yafan (second round)
3. (Thailand) Luksika Kumkhum (first round)
4. (Japan) Miyu Kato (second round)
5. (China) Yang Zhaoxuan (first round)
6. (China) Zhu Lin (first round)
7. (China) Zhang Yuxuan (semifinals)
8. (Japan) Mayo Hibi (final)

== Main draw ==
=== Key ===
- Q = Qualifier
- WC = Wild card
- LL = Lucky loser
- Alt = Alternate
- SE = Special exempt
- PR = Protected ranking
- ITF = ITF entry
- JE = Junior exempt
- w/o = Walkover
- r = Retired
- d = Defaulted
- SR = Special ranking

=== Finals ===
Semifinals
1	(China) Wang Qiang	6	6
7	(China) Zhang Yuxuan	4	4
8	(Japan) Mayo Hibi	6	6
(Uzbekistan) Sabina Sharipova	3	0

Final
1	(China) Wang Qiang	6	6
8	(Japan) Mayo Hibi	2	0

=== Top half ===
First round
1	(China) Q Wang	6	6
WC	(China) Yuk Zhang	1	1
(South Korea) N-l Han	6	6
(Russia) K Lykina	3	1
(Japan) R Sawayanagi	6	7^{7}
PR	(Japan) M Imanishi	1	6^{4}
WC	(China) C Liang	4	6	6
5	(China) Z Yang	6	3	3
3	(Thailand) L Kumkhum	5	6	2
(Japan) H Kuwata	7	0	6
JE	(United Kingdom) K Swan	1	3
LL	(Japan) S Aoyama	6	6
WC	(China) S Peng	2	6	6
(Japan) E Hozumi	6	4	1
(Thailand) V Wongteanchai	2	4
7	(China) Yux Zhang	6	6

Second round
1	(China) Q Wang	7^{7}	6
(South Korea) N-l Han	6^{2}	1
(Japan) R Sawayanagi	6	6
WC	(China) C Liang	4	4
(Japan) H Kuwata	4	4
LL	(Japan) S Aoyama	6	6
WC	(China) S Peng	2	2
7	(China) Yux Zhang	6	6

Quarterfinals
1	(China) Q Wang	6	6
(Japan) R Sawayanagi	1	2
LL	(Japan) S Aoyama	5	2
7	(China) Yux Zhang	7	6

Semifinals
1	(China) Q Wang	6	6
7	(China) Yux Zhang	4	4

=== Bottom half ===
First round
8	(Japan) M Hibi	6	6^{4}	6
(Japan) A Okuno	4	7^{7}	0
WC	(China) W Zheng	6	6
Q	(China) X Sun	4	1
Q	(Slovenia) D Jakupović	4	6	6^{6}
(South Korea) S-j Jang	6	3	7^{8}
Q	(Italy) J Pieri	4	0
4	(Japan) M Kato	6	6
6	(China) L Zhu	3	4
(Uzbekistan) S Sharipova	6	6
(China) F Liu	3	4
(China) J Lu	6	6
(China) C Liu	6	6
(Japan) E Sema	1	3
Q	(Chinese Taipei) C-y Hsu	4	1
2	(China) Y Wang	6	6

Second round
8	(Japan) M Hibi	6	6
WC	(China) W Zheng	1	2
(South Korea) S-j Jang	7^{7}	6
4	(Japan) M Kato	6^{1}	3
(Uzbekistan) S Sharipova	6	6
(China) J Lu	1	3
(China) C Liu	6	4	7
2	(China) Y Wang	2	6	5

Quarterfinals
8	(Japan) M Hibi	6^{4}	7	6
(South Korea) S-j Jang	7^{7}	5	2
(Uzbekistan) S Sharipova	6	7
(China) C Liu	1	5

Semifinals
8	(Japan) M Hibi	6	6
(Uzbekistan) S Sharipova	3	0
