= 2016 Gemdale ATP Challenger =

- Date: 21–27 March
- Edition: 3rd
- Draw: 32S / 16D
- Prize money: $75,000+H
- Surface: Hard
- Location: Shenzhen, China

Champions

Singles
- (Israel) Dudi Sela

Doubles
- (Australia) Luke Saville / (Australia) Jordan Thompson
← 2015 ·	Gemdale ATP Challenger	· 2017 →

The 2016 Gemdale ATP Challenger was a professional tennis tournament played on hard courts. It was the third edition of the tournament which was part of the 2016 ATP Challenger Tour. It took place in Shenzhen, China between 21 and 27 March 2016.

== Singles main-draw entrants ==
=== Seeds ===
Country	Player	Rank^{1}	Seed
JPN	Taro Daniel	86	1
ISR	Dudi Sela	88	2
ESP	Daniel Gimeno Traver	91	3
SRB	Filip Krajinović	97	4
SVK	Lukáš Lacko	106	5
GEO	Nikoloz Basilashvili	117	6
BEL	Kimmer Coppejans	122	7
AUS	Jordan Thompson	123	8

- ^{1} Rankings are as of March 14, 2016.

=== Other entrants ===
The following players received wildcards into the singles main draw:

- (China) Chen Long
- (China) Sun Fajing
- (China) Wang Chuhan
- (China) Qi Xi

The following players received entry courtesy of a special exemption:

- (China) Li Zhe

The following players received entry from the qualifying draw:

- (Belgium) Niels Desein
- (Croatia) Viktor Galović
- (Spain) Enrique López Pérez
- (Czech Republic) Jan Šátral

== Champions ==
=== Singles ===
- (Israel) Dudi Sela def. (China) Wu Di, 6–4, 6–3

=== Doubles ===
- (Australia) Luke Saville / (Australia) Jordan Thompson def. (India) Saketh Myneni/ (India) Jeevan Nedunchezhiyan, 3–6, 6–4, [12–10]
