= 2019 Pingshan Open =

- Date: 11–17 March
- Edition: 6th (men); 5th (women)
- Category: ATP Challenger Tour; ITF Women's World Tennis Tour
- Prize money: $81,240 (men) $60,000 (women)
- Surface: Hard
- Location: Shenzhen, China

Champions

Men's singles
- (Cyprus) Marcos Baghdatis

Women's singles
- (Denmark) Clara Tauson

Men's doubles
- (Chinese Taipei) Hsieh Cheng-peng / (Indonesia) Christopher Rungkat

Women's doubles
- (Chinese Taipei) Liang En-shuo / (China) Xun Fangying
- Pingshan Open

The 2019 Pingshan Open was a professional tennis tournament played on outdoor hard courts. It was the sixth and fifth editions of the tournament which was part of the 2019 ATP Challenger Tour and the 2019 ITF Women's World Tennis Tour. It took place in Shenzhen, China between 11 and 17 March 2019.

== Men's singles main-draw entrants ==
=== Seeds ===
Country	Player	Rank^{1}	Seed
CAN	Brayden Schnur	106	1
CYP	Marcos Baghdatis	129	2
GER	Oscar Otte	144	3
AUS	James Duckworth	166	4
KOR	Kwon Soon-woo	170	5
JPN	Hiroki Moriya	174	6
JPN	Yūichi Sugita	176	7
GBR	James Ward	178	8
GER	Rudolf Molleker	180	9
ESP	Alejandro Davidovich Fokina	181	10
ISR	Dudi Sela	186	11
GER	Mats Moraing	188	12
ITA	Lorenzo Giustino	189	13
KAZ	Aleksandr Nedovyesov	193	14
SLO	Blaž Rola	199	15
CHN	Zhang Ze	201	16

- ^{1} Rankings are as of 4 March 2019.

=== Other entrants ===
The following players received wildcards into the singles main draw:

- (China) He Yecong
- (China) Wu Di
- (China) Wu Yibing
- (China) Xia Zihao
- (China) Zhang Zhizhen

The following players received entry into the singles main draw using their ITF World Tennis Ranking:

- (Spain) Javier Barranco Cosano
- (Italy) Raúl Brancaccio
- (France) Baptiste Crepatte
- (Egypt) Karim-Mohamed Maamoun

The following players received entry from the qualifying draw:

- (Northern Mariana Islands) Colin Sinclair
- (Russia) Evgenii Tiurnev

== Women's singles main-draw entrants ==
=== Seeds ===
Country	Player	Rank^{1}	Seed
ISR	Julia Glushko	131	1
UZB	Sabina Sharipova	138	2
AUS	Kimberly Birrell	157	3
CHN	Han Xinyun	164	4
IND	Ankita Raina	166	5
CHN	Liu Fangzhou	172	6
POL	Magdalena Fręch	176	7
CHN	Lu Jiajing	186	8

- ^{1} Rankings are as of 4 March 2019.

=== Other entrants ===
The following players received wildcards into the singles main draw:

- (China) Guo Meiqi
- (China) Ma Shuyue
- (China) Wu Meixu
- (China) Yuan Yue

The following player received entry using a junior exempt:

- (Denmark) Clara Tauson

The following players received entry from the qualifying draw:

- (China) Feng Shuo
- (China) Ma Yexin
- (Japan) Chihiro Muramatsu
- (Japan) Kyōka Okamura
- (Germany) Sarah-Rebecca Sekulic
- (China) You Xiaodi

== Champions ==
=== Men's singles ===
- (Cyprus) Marcos Baghdatis def. (Italy) Stefano Napolitano 6–2, 3–6, 6–4.

=== Women's singles ===
- (Denmark) Clara Tauson def. (China) Liu Fangzhou, 6–4, 6–3

=== Men's doubles ===
- (Chinese Taipei) Hsieh Cheng-peng / (Indonesia) Christopher Rungkat def. (China) Li Zhe / (Portugal) Gonçalo Oliveira 6–4, 3–6, [10–6].

=== Women's doubles ===
- (Chinese Taipei) Liang En-shuo / (China) Xun Fangying def. (Japan) Hiroko Kuwata / (Uzbekistan) Sabina Sharipova, 6–4, 6–1
