= 2016 ITF Women's Circuit – Shenzhen =

- Date: 11–17 April
- Edition: 2nd
- Category: ITF Women's Circuit
- Prize money: $50,000
- Surface: Hard
- Location: Shenzhen, China

Champions

Singles
- (China) Wang Qiang

Doubles
- (Japan) Shuko Aoyama / (Japan) Makoto Ninomiya
← 2015 ·	ITF Women's Circuit – Shenzhen	· 2017 →

The 2016 ITF Women's Circuit – Shenzhen was a professional tennis tournament played on outdoor hard courts. It was the second edition of the tournament and part of the 2016 ITF Women's Circuit, offering a total of $50,000 in prize money. It took place in Shenzhen, China, on 11–17 April 2016.

== Singles main draw entrants ==
=== Seeds ===
Country	Player	Rank^{1}	Seed
CHN	Wang Qiang	87	1
CHN	Wang Yafan	136	2
THA	Luksika Kumkhum	139	3
JPN	Miyu Kato	146	4
CHN	Yang Zhaoxuan	164	5
CHN	Zhu Lin	180	6
CHN	Zhang Yuxuan	181	7
JPN	Mayo Hibi	184	8

- ^{1} Rankings as of 4 April 2016.

=== Other entrants ===
The following players received wildcards into the singles main draw:

- (China) Liang Chen
- (China) Peng Shuai
- (China) Zhang Yukun
- (China) Zheng Wushuang

The following players received entry from the qualifying draw:

- (Chinese Taipei) Hsu Chieh-yu
- (Slovenia) Dalila Jakupović
- (Italy) Jessica Pieri
- (China) Sun Xuliu

The following player received entry by a lucky loser:

- (Japan) Shuko Aoyama

The following player received entry by a protected ranking:

- (Japan) Miharu Imanishi

The following player received entry by a junior exempt:

- (United Kingdom) Katie Swan

== Champions ==
=== Singles ===
- (China) Wang Qiang def. (Japan) Mayo Hibi, 6–2, 6–0

=== Doubles ===
- (Japan) Shuko Aoyama / (Japan) Makoto Ninomiya def. (China) Liang Chen / (China) Wang Yafan, 7–6^{(7–5)}, 6–4
