= 2017 Pingshan Open =

- Date: 13–19 March
- Edition: 4th (ATP); 3rd (ITF)
- Category: ATP Challenger Tour; ITF Women's Circuit
- Prize money: $75,000+H (ATP) $60,000 (ITF)
- Surface: Hard
- Location: Shenzhen, China

Champions

Men's singles
- (Japan) Yūichi Sugita

Women's singles
- (Russia) Ekaterina Alexandrova

Men's doubles
- (Thailand) Sanchai Ratiwatana / (Thailand) Sonchat Ratiwatana

Women's doubles
- (Ukraine) Lyudmyla Kichenok / (Ukraine) Nadiia Kichenok
- Pingshan Open

The 2017 Pingshan Open was a professional tennis tournament played on outdoor hard courts. It was the fourth (ATP) and third (ITF) editions of the tournament and was part of the 2017 ATP Challenger Tour and the 2017 ITF Women's Circuit, offering $75,000+H (ATP) and $60,000 (ITF) in prize money. It was held in Shenzhen, China, from 13 to 19 March 2017.

== Men's singles main draw entrants ==
=== Seeds ===
Country	Player	Rank^{1}	Seed
RUS	Evgeny Donskoy	99	1
JPN	Yūichi Sugita	115	2
ESP	Roberto Carballés Baena	127	3
KOR	Lee Duck-hee	135	4
ITA	Luca Vanni	139	5
SLO	Blaž Kavčič	147	6
GER	Maximilian Marterer	152	7
ITA	Thomas Fabbiano	161	8

- ^{1} Rankings as of 6 March 2017.

=== Other entrants ===
The following players received wildcards into the singles main draw:

- (China) Bai Yan
- (China) Chuhan Wang
- (China) Zhang Zhizhen
- (China) Zheng Wei Qiang

The following player received entry into the singles main draw as an alternate:

- (Japan) Yasutaka Uchiyama

The following player received entry into the singles main draw using a protected ranking:

- (India) Yuki Bhambri

The following players received entry from the qualifying draw:

- (Poland) Hubert Hurkacz
- (France) Axel Michon
- (Russia) Roman Safiullin
- (Croatia) Franko Škugor

== Women's singles main draw entrants ==
=== Seeds ===
Country	Player	Rank^{1}	Seed
TPE	Hsieh Su-wei	100	1
CHN	Zheng Saisai	103	2
RUS	Ekaterina Alexandrova	106	3
CZE	Denisa Allertová	113	4
TPE	Chang Kai-chen	118	5
CHN	Han Xinyun	119	6
BEL	Maryna Zanevska	121	7
SRB	Nina Stojanović	130	8

- ^{1} Rankings as of 6 March 2017

=== Other entrants ===
The following players received wildcards into the singles main draw:

- (China) Lu Jiajing
- (China) Zhang Ying
- (China) Zhang Yukun
- (China) Zhang Yuxuan

The following players received entry from the qualifying draw:

- (Thailand) Luksika Kumkhum
- (Belarus) Vera Lapko
- (China) Lu Jingjing
- (Italy) Jessica Pieri

== Champions ==
=== Men's singles ===
- (Japan) Yūichi Sugita def. (Slovenia) Blaž Kavčič 7–6^{(8–6)}, 6–4.

=== Women's singles ===
- (Russia) Ekaterina Alexandrova def. (Belarus) Aryna Sabalenka, 6–2, 7–5

=== Men's doubles ===
- (Thailand) Sanchai Ratiwatana / (Thailand) Sonchat Ratiwatana def. (Chinese Taipei) Hsieh Cheng-peng / (Indonesia) Christopher Rungkat 6–2, 6–7^{(5–7)}, [10–6].

=== Women's doubles ===
- (Ukraine) Lyudmyla Kichenok / (Ukraine) Nadiia Kichenok def. (Japan) Eri Hozumi / (Russia) Valeria Savinykh 6–4, 6–4.
