= 2015 Gemdale ATP Challenger China International Shenzhen =

- Date: 16 – 22 March
- Edition: 2nd
- Draw: 32S / 16D
- Prize money: $75,000+H
- Surface: Hard
- Location: Shenzhen, China

Champions

Singles
- (Slovenia) Blaž Kavčič

Doubles
- (Germany) Gero Kretschmer / (Germany) Alexander Satschko
- Gemdale ATP Challenger China International Shenzhen

The 2015 Gemdale ATP Challenger China International Shenzhen was a professional tennis tournament played on hard courts. It was the second edition of the tournament which was part of the 2015 ATP Challenger Tour. It took place in Shenzhen, China between 16 and 22 March 2015.

== Singles main draw entrants ==
=== Seeds ===
Country	Player	Rank^{1}	Seed
SLO	Blaž Kavčič	111	1
KAZ	Aleksandr Nedovyesov	118	2
RUS	Alexander Kudryavtsev	132	3
AUS	John Millman	137	4
JPN	Yūichi Sugita	148	5
JPN	Hiroki Moriya	157	6
ESP	Roberto Carballés Baena	160	7
HUN	Márton Fucsovics	165	8

- ^{1} Rankings are as of March 9, 2015

=== Other entrants ===
The following players received wildcards into the singles main draw:

- (China) Li Zhe
- (China) Gao Xin
- (China) Wang Chuhan
- (China) Wu Di

The following players received entry from the qualifying draw:

- (Japan) Yasutaka Uchiyama
- (Germany) Richard Becker
- (India) Sanam Singh
- (Chinese Taipei) Yang Tsung-hua

== Champions ==
=== Singles ===
- (Slovenia) Blaž Kavčič def. (Brazil) André Ghem, 7–5, 6–4

=== Doubles ===
- (Germany) Gero Kretschmer / (Germany) Alexander Satschko def. (India) Saketh Myneni / (India) Divij Sharan, 6–1, 3–6, [10–2]
