= Pingshan Open =

- 2019 Pingshan Open

Defunct tennis tournament
- Event name: Gemdale ATP Challenger (2014–2016); ITF Women's Circuit – Shenzhen (2015–2016)
- Location: Shenzhen, China
- Venue: Shenzhen International Tennis Center
- Surface: Hard
ATP Tour
- Category: ATP Challenger Tour
- Draw: 32S/32Q/16D
- Prize money: $75,000+H
WTA Tour
- Category: ITF Women's Circuit
- Draw: 32S/32Q/16D
- Prize money: $60,000

The Pingshan Open was a professional tennis tournament played on hardcourts. The event was part of the ATP Challenger Tour and the ITF Women's Circuit, and held in Shenzhen, China from 2014 to 2019.

== Past finals ==
=== Men's singles ===
Year	Champion	Runner-up	Score
2020	Tournament cancelled due to the COVID-19 pandemic		
2019	(Cyprus) Marcos Baghdatis	(Italy) Stefano Napolitano	6–2, 3–6, 6–4
2018	(Belarus) Ilya Ivashka	(China) Zhang Ze	6–4, 6–2
2017	(Japan) Yūichi Sugita	(Slovenia) Blaž Kavčič	7–6^{(8–6)}, 6–4
2016	(Israel) Dudi Sela	(China) Wu Di	6–4, 6–3
2015	(Slovenia) Blaž Kavčič	(Brazil) André Ghem	7–5, 6–4
2014	(Luxembourg) Gilles Müller	(Slovakia) Lukáš Lacko	7–6^{(7–4)}, 6–3

=== Women's singles ===
Year	Champion	Runner-up	Score
2020	Tournament cancelled due to the COVID-19 pandemic		
2019	(Denmark) Clara Tauson	(China) Liu Fangzhou	6–4, 6–3
2018	(Slovakia) Viktória Kužmová	(Russia) Anna Kalinskaya	7–5, 6–3
2017	(Russia) Ekaterina Alexandrova	(Belarus) Aryna Sabalenka	6–2, 7–5
2016	(China) Wang Qiang	(Japan) Mayo Hibi	6–2, 6–0
2015	(Chinese Taipei) Hsieh Su-wei	(China) Yang Zhaoxuan	6–2, 6–2

=== Men's doubles ===
Year	Champions	Runners-up	Score
2020	Tournament cancelled due to the COVID-19 pandemic		
2019	(Chinese Taipei) Hsieh Cheng-peng (Indonesia) Christopher Rungkat	(China) Li Zhe (Portugal) Gonçalo Oliveira	6–4, 3–6, [10–6]
2018	(Chinese Taipei) Hsieh Cheng-peng (Australia) Rameez Junaid	(Ukraine) Denys Molchanov (Slovakia) Igor Zelenay	7–6^{(7–3)}, 6–3
2017	(Thailand) Sanchai Ratiwatana (Thailand) Sonchat Ratiwatana	(Chinese Taipei) Hsieh Cheng-peng (Indonesia) Christopher Rungkat	6–2, 6–7^{(5–7)}, [10–6]
2016	(Australia) Luke Saville (Australia) Jordan Thompson	(India) Saketh Myneni (India) Jeevan Nedunchezhiyan	3–6, 6–4, [12–10]
2015	(Germany) Gero Kretschmer (Germany) Alexander Satschko	(India) Saketh Myneni (India) Divij Sharan	6–1, 3–6, [10–2]
2014	(Australia) Sam Groth (Australia) Chris Guccione	(Germany) Dominik Meffert (Germany) Tim Pütz	6–3, 7–6^{(7–5)}

=== Women's doubles ===
Year	Champions	Runners-up	Score
2020	Tournament cancelled due to the COVID-19 pandemic		
2019	(Chinese Taipei) Liang En-shuo (China) Xun Fangying	(Japan) Hiroko Kuwata (Uzbekistan) Sabina Sharipova	6–4, 6–1
2018	(Russia) Anna Kalinskaya (Slovakia) Viktória Kužmová	(Montenegro) Danka Kovinić (China) Wang Xinyu	6–4, 1–6, [10–7]
2017	(Ukraine) Lyudmyla Kichenok (Ukraine) Nadiia Kichenok	(Japan) Eri Hozumi (Russia) Valeria Savinykh	6–4, 6–4
2016	(Japan) Shuko Aoyama (Japan) Makoto Ninomiya	(China) Liang Chen (China) Wang Yafan	7–6^{(7–5)}, 6–4
2015	(Thailand) Noppawan Lertcheewakarn (China) Lu Jiajing	(South Korea) Han Na-lae (South Korea) Jang Su-jeong	6–4, 7–5
