= 2017 Kunming Open =

- Date: 24–30 April
- Edition: 6th (ATP); 4th (ITF)
- Category: ATP Challenger Tour; ITF Women's Circuit
- Prize money: $150,000+H (ATP) $100,000+H (ITF)
- Surface: Clay
- Location: Anning, China

Champions

Men's singles
- (Serbia) Janko Tipsarević

Women's singles
- (China) Zheng Saisai

Men's doubles
- (Croatia) Dino Marcan / (Austria) Tristan-Samuel Weissborn

Women's doubles
- (China) Han Xinyun / (China) Ye Qiuyu
← 2016 ·	Kunming Open	· 2018 →

The 2017 Kunming Open was a professional tennis tournament played on outdoor clay courts. It was the sixth (ATP) and fourth (ITF) editions of the tournament and part of the 2017 ATP Challenger Tour and the 2017 ITF Women's Circuit, offering $150,000+H (ATP) and $100,000+H (ITF) in prize money. It took place in Anning, China, from 24–30 April 2017.

== Point distribution ==
Event	W	F	SF	QF	Round of 16	Round of 32	Q	Q2
Singles	125	75	45	25	10	0	5	0
Doubles	125	75	45	25	0	—	—	—

== Men's singles main draw entrants ==
=== Seeds ===
Country	Player	Rank^{1}	Seed
AUS	Jordan Thompson	79	1
SRB	Janko Tipsarević	89	2
ITA	Luca Vanni	122	3
SVK	Andrej Martin	123	4
SLO	Blaž Kavčič	129	5
FRA	Quentin Halys	143	6
FRA	Mathias Bourgue	151	7
RUS	Teymuraz Gabashvili	157	8

- ^{1} Rankings as of 17 April 2017.

=== Other entrants ===
The following players received wildcards into the singles main draw:

- (China) Bai Yan
- (China) He Yecong
- (China) Sun Fajing
- (China) Xia Zihao

The following player received entry into the singles main draw using a protected ranking:

- (Spain) Daniel Muñoz de la Nava

The following player received entry into the singles main draw as a special exempt:

- (Germany) Oscar Otte

The following players received entry from the qualifying draw:

- (Canada) Félix Auger-Aliassime
- (India) Prajnesh Gunneswaran
- (Argentina) Juan Pablo Paz
- (Italy) Gianluigi Quinzi

== Women's singles main draw entrants ==
=== Seeds ===
Country	Player	Rank^{1}	Seed
~~CHN~~	~~Peng Shuai~~	~~40~~	~~1~~
CHN	Zheng Saisai	90	2
JPN	Kurumi Nara	98	3
CHN	Zhang Kailin	120	4
CHN	Han Xinyun	121	5
CHN	Zhu Lin	140	6
JPN	Hiroko Kuwata	179	7
GRE	Valentini Grammatikopoulou	196	8

- ^{1} Rankings as of 17 April 2017.

=== Other entrants ===
The following players received wildcards into the singles main draw:

- (China) Kang Jiaqi
- (China) Pei Tingting
- (China) ~~Peng Shuai~~
- (China) Yang Zhaoxuan

The following players received entry from the qualifying draw:

- (Japan) Mana Ayukawa
- (Japan) Nagi Hanatani
- (Australia) Jessica Moore
- (China) Sun Xuliu

The following player received entry into the singles main draw by a lucky loser:

- (China) Gai Ao

== Champions ==
=== Men's singles ===
- (Serbia) Janko Tipsarević def. (France) Quentin Halys 6–7^{(5–7)}, 6–3, 6–4.

=== Women's singles ===
- (China) Zheng Saisai def. (Kazakhstan) Zarina Diyas, 7–5, 6–4

=== Men's doubles ===
- (Croatia) Dino Marcan / (Austria) Tristan-Samuel Weissborn def. (Australia) Steven de Waard / (Slovenia) Blaž Kavčič 5–7, 6–3, [10–7].

=== Women's doubles ===
- (China) Han Xinyun / (China) Ye Qiuyu def. (India) Prarthana Thombare / (China) Xun Fangying, 6–2, 7–5
