= 2018 Kunming Open =

- Date: 23–29 April (ATP); 30 April–5 May (WTA)
- Edition: 7th (ATP); 1st (WTA)
- Category: ATP Challenger Tour; WTA 125K series
- Surface: Clay
- Location: Anning, China

Champions

Men's singles
- (India) Prajnesh Gunneswaran

Women's singles
- (Russia) Irina Khromacheva

Men's doubles
- (Belarus) Aliaksandr Bury / (South Africa) Lloyd Harris

Women's doubles
- (Slovenia) Dalila Jakupović / (Russia) Irina Khromacheva
← 2017 ·	Kunming Open	· 2019 →

The 2018 Kunming Open was a professional tennis tournament played on outdoor clay courts. It was the seventh (ATP) and first (WTA) edition of the tournament and part of the 2018 ATP Challenger Tour and the 2018 WTA 125K series. It took place in Anning, China, from 23 April–5 May 2018.

== Men's singles main draw entrants ==
=== Seeds ===
Country	Player	Rank^{1}	Seed
CAN	Vasek Pospisil	77	1
RUS	Evgeny Donskoy	87	2
AUS	Jordan Thompson	99	3
IND	Ramkumar Ramanathan	116	4
FRA	Quentin Halys	118	5
FRA	Calvin Hemery	130	6
AUS	Alex Bolt	177	7
KOR	Kwon Soon-woo	208	8

- ^{1} Rankings as of 16 April 2018.

=== Other entrants ===
The following players received wildcards into the singles main draw:

- (China) Bai Yan
- (China) Li Yuanfeng
- (China) Wang Ruikai
- (China) Wang Ruixuan

The following players received entry from the qualifying draw:

- (India) Sriram Balaji
- (South Korea) Chung Yun-seong
- (India) Sasikumar Mukund
- (India) Vishnu Vardhan

The following player entered as a lucky loser:

- (France) Hugo Grenier

== Women's singles main draw entrants ==
=== Seeds ===
Country	Player	Rank^{1}	Seed
CHN	Peng Shuai	42	1
CHN	Wang Yafan	86	2
BEL	Yanina Wickmayer	98	3
CHN	Zheng Saisai	124	4
SLO	Dalila Jakupović	130	5
CAN	Carol Zhao	138	6
CHN	Han Xinyun	150	7
CHN	Liu Fangzhou	179	8

- ^{1} Rankings as of 23 April 2018.

=== Other entrants ===
The following players received wildcards into the singles main draw:

- (China) Jiang Xinyu
- (China) Peng Shuai
- (China) Tang Qianhui
- (China) Yang Zhaoxuan
- (China) Zheng Wushuang

The following players received entry from the qualifying draw:

- (Japan) Nagi Hanatani
- (Serbia) Natalija Kostić
- (Russia) Nika Kukharchuk
- (Bulgaria) Aleksandrina Naydenova

== Women's doubles main draw entrants ==
=== Seeds ===
Country	Player	Country	Player	Rank^{1}	Seed
SLO	Dalila Jakupović	RUS	Irina Khromacheva	124	1
CHN	Han Xinyun	CHN	Ye Qiuyu	233	2
CHN	Jiang Xinyu	CHN	Tang Qianhui	244	3
IND	Prarthana Thombare	CHN	Xun Fangying	330	4

- Rankings are as of 23 April 2018

The following team received wildcard into the doubles draw:

- (China) Ren Jiaqi / (China) Zheng Wushuang

== Champions ==
=== Men's singles ===
- (India) Prajnesh Gunneswaran def. (Egypt) Mohamed Safwat, 5–7, 6–3, 6–1

=== Women's singles ===
- (Russia) Irina Khromacheva def. (China) Zheng Saisai, 3–6, 6–4, 7–6^{(7–5)}

=== Men's doubles ===
- (Belarus) Aliaksandr Bury / (South Africa) Lloyd Harris def. (China) Gong Maoxin / (China) Zhang Ze, 6–3, 6–4

=== Women's doubles ===
- (Slovenia) Dalila Jakupović / (Russia) Irina Khromacheva def. (China) Guo Hanyu / (China) Sun Xuliu, 6–1, 6–1
