= 2016 Kunming Open =

- Date: 25 April–1 May (ATP); 2–8 May (ITF)
- Edition: 5th (ATP); 3rd (ITF)
- Category: ATP Challenger Tour; ITF Women's Circuit
- Prize money: $100,000 (ATP) $100,000 (ITF)
- Surface: Clay
- Location: Anning, China

Champions

Men's singles
- (Australia) Jordan Thompson

Women's singles
- (China) Zhang Kailin

Men's doubles
- (China) Bai Yan / (Italy) Riccardo Ghedin

Women's doubles
- (China) Wang Yafan / (China) Zhang Kailin
← 2015 ·	Kunming Open	· 2017 →

The 2016 Kunming Open was a professional tennis tournament played on outdoor clay courts. It was the fifth edition for men and third edition for women of the tournament and part of the 2016 ATP Challenger Tour and the 2016 ITF Women's Circuit, offering a total of $100,000 for men and women in prize money. It took place in Anning, China, between 25 April–1 May for men and 2–8 May 2016 for women.

== Men's singles main draw entrants ==
=== Seeds ===
Country	Player	Rank^{1}	Seed
JPN	Yoshihito Nishioka	101	1
AUS	Jordan Thompson	121	2
IND	Saketh Myneni	150	3
SLO	Grega Žemlja	161	4
USA	Alexander Sarkissian	165	5
CHN	Zhang Ze	166	6
FRA	Mathias Bourgue	194	7
BEL	Arthur De Greef	199	8

- ^{1} Rankings as of 18 April 2016

=== Other entrants ===
The following players received wildcards into the singles main draw:

- (China) Xia Zihao
- (China) He Yecong
- (China) Te Rigele
- (China) Ouyang Bowen

The following players received entry from the qualifying draw:

- (Japan) Yoshihito Nishioka
- (Germany) Yannick Hanfmann
- (Australia) Matt Reid
- (Australia) Greg Jones

== Women's singles main draw entrants ==
=== Seeds ===
Country	Player	Rank^{1}	Seed
CHN	Zhang Shuai	62	1
CHN	Han Xinyun	122	2
CHN	Wang Yafan	135	3
CHN	Zhang Kailin	143	4
CHN	Yang Zhaoxuan	165	5
CHN	Liu Chang	198	6
CHN	Lu Jiajing	205	7
RUS	Viktoria Kamenskaya	259	8

- ^{1} Rankings as of 25 April 2016

=== Other entrants ===
The following players received wildcards into the singles main draw:

- (China) Peng Shuai
- (China) Xun Fangying
- (China) Zhang Shuai
- (China) Zhao Di

The following players received entry from the qualifying draw:

- (China) Gai Ao
- (China) Guo Shanshan
- (France) Harmony Tan
- (China) Ye Qiuyu

== Champions ==
=== Men's singles ===
- (Australia) Jordan Thompson def. (France) Mathias Bourgue, 6–3, 6–2

=== Women's singles ===
- (China) Zhang Kailin def. (China) Peng Shuai, 6–1, 0–6, 4–2, retired

=== Men's doubles ===
- (China) Bai Yan / (Italy) Riccardo Ghedin def. (Ukraine) Denys Molchanov / (Kazakhstan) Aleksandr Nedovyesov, 4–6, 6–3, [10–6]

=== Women's doubles ===
- (China) Wang Yafan / (China) Zhang Kailin def. (Thailand) Varatchaya Wongteanchai / (China) Yang Zhaoxuan, 6–7^{(3–7)}, 7–6^{(7–2)}, [10–1]
