= 2018 Kunming Open – Women's singles =

Women's singles
- 2018 Kunming Open

Final
- Champion: (Russia) Irina Khromacheva
- Runner-up: (China) Zheng Saisai
- Score: 3–6, 6–4, 7–6^{(7–5)}

Events
Singles	men	women
Doubles	men	women
← 2017 ·	Kunming Open	· 2019 →

Zheng Saisai was the defending champion but lost in the final to Irina Khromacheva 3–6, 6–4, 7–6^{(7–5)}.

== Seeds ==
1. (China) Peng Shuai (semifinals)
2. (China) Wang Yafan (quarterfinals)
3. (Belgium) Yanina Wickmayer (quarterfinals)
4. (China) Zheng Saisai (final)
5. (Slovenia) Dalila Jakupović (second round)
6. (Canada) Carol Zhao (second round)
7. (China) Han Xinyun (semifinals)
8. (China) Liu Fangzhou (first round)

== Draw ==
=== Key ===
- Q = Qualifier
- WC = Wild card
- LL = Lucky loser
- Alt = Alternate
- SE = Special exempt
- PR = Protected ranking
- ITF = ITF entry
- JE = Junior exempt
- w/o = Walkover
- r = Retired
- d = Defaulted
- SR = Special ranking

=== Finals ===
Semifinals
1/WC	(China) Peng Shuai	5	1
4	(China) Zheng Saisai	7	6
(Russia) Irina Khromacheva	6	6
7	(China) Han Xinyun	1	3

Final
4	(China) Zheng Saisai	6	4	6^{5}
(Russia) Irina Khromacheva	3	6	7^{7}

=== Top half ===
First round
1/WC	(China) S Peng	4	6	6
Q	(Bulgaria) A Naydenova	6	1	4
WC	(China) Z Yang	6	4	6
Q	(Japan) N Hanatani	3	6	3
(Bulgaria) E Kostova	6	6
(United States) J Cako	4	1
(Japan) A Shimizu	1	2
5	(Slovenia) D Jakupović	6	6
4	(China) S Zheng	6	6
(Japan) S Akita	4	3
(China) H Guo	0	1
(China) X You	6	6
(France) A Hesse	6^{5}	6	6
(China) J Kang	7^{7}	4	1
(France) S Reix	6^{0}	3
6	(Canada) C Zhao	7^{7}	6

Second round
1/WC	(China) S Peng	5	6	6
WC	(China) Z Yang	7	4	3
(Bulgaria) E Kostova	7^{7}	0	6
5	(Slovenia) D Jakupović	6^{3}	6	1
4	(China) S Zheng	6	6^{5}	6
(China) X You	2	7^{7}	3
(France) A Hesse	7^{7}	7^{10}
6	(Canada) C Zhao	6^{3}	6^{8}

Quarterfinals
1/WC	(China) S Peng	6	6
(Bulgaria) E Kostova	1	0
4	(China) S Zheng	5	6	6
(France) A Hesse	7	1	1

Semifinals
1/WC	(China) S Peng	5	1
4	(China) S Zheng	7	6

=== Bottom half ===
First round
8	(China) F Liu	2	1
(Australia) O Tjandramulia	6	6
(Russia) I Khromacheva	6	6
WC	(China) X Jiang	3	4
(Uzbekistan) S Sharipova	7	5	6
Q	(Russia) N Kukharchuk	5	7	2
Q	(Serbia) N Kostić	4	5
3	(Belgium) Y Wickmayer	6	7
7	(China) X Han	6	7^{7}
WC	(China) W Zheng	3	6^{5}
(China) F Xun	2	0
(Thailand) P Plipuech	6	6
WC	(China) Q Tang	2	1
(India) A Raina	6	6
(United States) D Lao	7	6^{6}	4
2	(China) Y Wang	5	7^{8}	6

Second round
(Australia) O Tjandramulia	6	0	2
(Russia) I Khromacheva	3	6	6
(Uzbekistan) S Sharipova	3	6	1
3	(Belgium) Y Wickmayer	6	3	6
7	(China) X Han	6	6
(Thailand) P Plipuech	3	0
(India) A Raina	6^{4}	5
2	(China) Y Wang	7^{7}	7

Quarterfinals
(Russia) I Khromacheva	2	6	6
3	(Belgium) Y Wickmayer	6	3	3
7	(China) X Han	6	2	6
2	(China) Y Wang	3	6	4

Semifinals
(Russia) I Khromacheva	6	6
7	(China) X Han	1	3

== Qualifying ==
=== Seeds ===
1. (Australia) Olivia Tjandramulia (moved to main draw)
2. (Serbia) Natalija Kostić (qualified)
3. (China) Sun Xuliu (qualifying competition)
4. (Bulgaria) Aleksandrina Naydenova (qualified)
5. (China) Gai Ao (qualifying competition)
6. (Japan) Nagi Hanatani (qualified)
7. (China) Ye Qiuyu (first round)
8. (Russia) Nika Kukharchuk (qualified)

=== Qualifiers ===
1. (Russia) Nika Kukharchuk
2. (Serbia) Natalija Kostić
3. (Japan) Nagi Hanatani
4. (Bulgaria) Aleksandrina Naydenova

=== Qualifying draw ===
==== First qualifier ====
First round
Alt	(Japan) Akari Inoue	1	5
(China) Feng Shuo	6	7
WC	(China) Ren Jiaqi	0	4
8	(Russia) Nika Kukharchuk	6	6

Qualifying competition
(China) Feng Shuo	3	4
8	(Russia) Nika Kukharchuk	6	6

==== Second qualifier ====
First round
2	(Serbia) Natalija Kostić	6	6
(China) Lu Jiaxi	2	1
(Indonesia) Beatrice Gumulya	6	3	6
7	(China) Ye Qiuyu	1	6	2

Qualifying competition
2	(Serbia) Natalija Kostić	6	6
(Indonesia) Beatrice Gumulya	1	4

==== Third qualifier ====
First round
3	(China) Sun Xuliu	7^{7}	7^{7}
(Japan) Michika Ozeki	6^{1}	6^{2}
(China) Ma Yexin	3	2
6	(Japan) Nagi Hanatani	6	6

Qualifying competition
3	(China) Sun Xuliu	3	1
6	(Japan) Nagi Hanatani	6	6

==== Fourth qualifier ====
First round
4	(Bulgaria) Aleksandrina Naydenova	7	6
(China) Guo Shanshan	5	4
WC	(China) Pei Tingting	0	1
5	(China) Gai Ao	6	6

Qualifying competition
4	(Bulgaria) Aleksandrina Naydenova	6	6
5	(China) Gai Ao	1	3
