= 2017 Kunming Open – Women's singles =

Women's singles
- 2017 Kunming Open

Final
- Champion: (China) Zheng Saisai
- Runner-up: (Kazakhstan) Zarina Diyas
- Score: 7–5, 6–4

Events
Singles	men	women
Doubles	men	women
← 2016 ·	Kunming Open	· 2018 →

Zhang Kailin was the defending champion, but lost in the first round to Xun Fangying.

Zheng Saisai won the title, defeating Zarina Diyas in the final, 7–5, 6–4.

== Seeds ==
1. (China) Peng Shuai (withdrew)
2. (China) Zheng Saisai (champion)
3. (Japan) Kurumi Nara (second round)
4. (China) Zhang Kailin (first round)
5. (China) Han Xinyun (quarterfinals)
6. (China) Zhu Lin (first round)
7. (Japan) Hiroko Kuwata (first round)
8. (Greece) Valentini Grammatikopoulou (quarterfinals)

== Draw ==
=== Key ===
- Q = Qualifier
- WC = Wild card
- LL = Lucky loser
- Alt = Alternate
- SE = Special exempt
- PR = Protected ranking
- ITF = ITF entry
- JE = Junior exempt
- w/o = Walkover
- r = Retired
- d = Defaulted
- SR = Special ranking

=== Finals ===
Semifinals
(Australia) Arina Rodionova	2	3
(Kazakhstan) Zarina Diyas	6	6
WC	(China) Yang Zhaoxuan	5	6	2
2	(China) Zheng Saisai	7	2	6

Final
(Kazakhstan) Zarina Diyas	5	4
2	(China) Zheng Saisai	7	6

=== Top half ===
First round
LL	(China) A Gai	6	7
Q	(China) X Sun	3	5
(Japan) S Akita	4	1
(Australia) Ar Rodionova	6	6
(Thailand) P Plipuech	6	7^{7}
WC	(China) J Kang	3	6^{2}
(Croatia) J Fett	6	6
6	(China) L Zhu	3	4
4	(China) K Zhang	2	1
(China) F Xun	6	6
(Kazakhstan) Z Diyas	6	7
(Thailand) V Wongteanchai	2	5
(China) J Lu	3	4
(United States) J Cako	6	6
(Japan) R Sawayanagi	2	0^{r}
8	(Greece) V Grammatikopoulou	6	2

Second round
LL	(China) A Gai	4	1
(Australia) Ar Rodionova	6	6
(Thailand) P Plipuech	3	2
(Croatia) J Fett	6	6
(China) F Xun	1	4
(Kazakhstan) Z Diyas	6	6
(United States) J Cako	4	6	1
8	(Greece) V Grammatikopoulou	6	2	6

Quarterfinals
(Australia) Ar Rodionova	7^{7}	1	6
(Croatia) J Fett	6^{5}	6	4
(Kazakhstan) Z Diyas	6	6
8	(Greece) V Grammatikopoulou	3	1

Semifinals
(Australia) Ar Rodionova	2	3
(Kazakhstan) Z Diyas	6	6

=== Bottom half ===
First round
5	(China) X Han	6	6
(France) H Tan	2	4
Q	(Australia) J Moore	6	6^{5}	6
(Japan) K Okamura	1	7^{7}	2
WC	(China) Z Yang	6	6
WC	(China) T Pei	3	0
(China) Y Zhang	6	0	3
3	(Japan) K Nara	3	6	6
7	(Japan) H Kuwata	1	2
(Japan) M Kato	6	6
(China) X Gao	6	7
(Israel) J Glushko	4	5
Q	(Japan) M Ayukawa	1	2
(Japan) E Hozumi	6	6
Q	(Japan) N Hanatani	0	6	4
2	(China) S Zheng	6	3	6

Second round
5	(China) X Han	6	7^{7}
Q	(Australia) J Moore	1	6^{3}
WC	(China) Z Yang	7	2	6
3	(Japan) K Nara	5	6	4
(Japan) M Kato	1	3
(China) X Gao	6	6
(Japan) E Hozumi	5	5
2	(China) S Zheng	7	7

Quarterfinals
5	(China) X Han	3	3
WC	(China) Z Yang	6	6
(China) X Gao	0	0
2	(China) S Zheng	6	6

Semifinals
WC	(China) Z Yang	5	6	2
2	(China) S Zheng	7	2	6
