= 2016 Kunming Open – Women's doubles =

Women's doubles
- 2016 Kunming Open

Final
- Champions: (China) Wang Yafan (China) Zhang Kailin
- Runners-up: (Thailand) Varatchaya Wongteanchai (China) Yang Zhaoxuan
- Score: 6–7^{(3–7)}, 7–6^{(7–2)}, [10–1]

Events
Singles	men	women
Doubles	men	women
← 2015 ·	Kunming Open	· 2017 →

Xu Yifan and Zheng Saisai were the defending champions, but both players chose to participate in Madrid instead.

The top seeds Wang Yafan and Zhang Kailin won the title, defeating second seeds Varatchaya Wongteanchai and Yang Zhaoxuan in the final, 6–7^{(3–7)}, 7–6^{(7–2)}, [10–1].

== Seeds ==
1. (China) Wang Yafan / (China) Zhang Kailin (champions)
2. (Thailand) Varatchaya Wongteanchai / (China) Yang Zhaoxuan (final)
3. (China) Han Xinyun / (Australia) Jessica Moore (quarterfinals)
4. (Chinese Taipei) Chan Chin-wei / (China) Liu Chang (first round)

== Draw ==
=== Key ===
- Q = Qualifier
- WC = Wild card
- LL = Lucky loser
- Alt = Alternate
- SE = Special exempt
- PR = Protected ranking
- ITF = ITF entry
- JE = Junior exempt
- w/o = Walkover
- r = Retired
- d = Defaulted
- SR = Special ranking

First round
1	(China) Yaf Wang (China) K Zhang	6	6
WC	(China) T Pei (China) Y Wu	1	3
(China) Q Ye (Hong Kong) L Zhang	6^{5}	6	[5]
WC	(China) Jiax Lu (China) X Sun	7^{7}	4	[10]
4	(Chinese Taipei) C-w Chan (China) C Liu	3	6	[7]
(China) R Tian (China) X You	6	2	[10]
(China) X Gao (China) Y Zhang	4	6^{4}
(China) Jiaj Lu (India) A Raina	6	7^{7}
(China) Yan Wang (China) F Xun	0	3
(Bulgaria) A Naydenova (Serbia) N Stojanović	6	6
WC	(China) A Gai (China) J Kang	6^{4}	5
3	(China) X Han (Australia) J Moore	7^{7}	7
(China) J Chen (China) D Zhao	6	6^{5}	[11]
(Kazakhstan) K Kerimbayeva (Russia) E Yashina	3	7^{7}	[13]
(Oman) F Al-Nabhani (Japan) J Namigata	3	2
2	(Thailand) V Wongteanchai (China) Z Yang	6	6

Quarterfinals
1	(China) Yaf Wang (China) K Zhang	7	6
WC	(China) Jiax Lu (China) X Sun	5	1
(China) R Tian (China) X You	6	6
(China) Jiaj Lu (India) A Raina	2	4
(Bulgaria) A Naydenova (Serbia) N Stojanović	7^{10}	4	[10]
3	(China) X Han (Australia) J Moore	6^{8}	6	[6]
(Kazakhstan) K Kerimbayeva (Russia) E Yashina	5	2
2	(Thailand) V Wongteanchai (China) Z Yang	7	6

Semifinals
1	(China) Yaf Wang (China) K Zhang	6^{6}	6	[10]
(China) R Tian (China) X You	7^{8}	2	[8]
(Bulgaria) A Naydenova (Serbia) N Stojanović	4	7	[10]
2	(Thailand) V Wongteanchai (China) Z Yang	6	5	[12]

Final
1	(China) Yaf Wang (China) K Zhang	6^{3}	7^{7}	[10]
2	(Thailand) V Wongteanchai (China) Z Yang	7^{7}	6^{2}	[1]
