= 2017 Kunming Open – Women's doubles =

Women's doubles
- 2017 Kunming Open

Final
- Champion: (China) Han Xinyun (China) Ye Qiuyu
- Runner-up: (India) Prarthana Thombare (China) Xun Fangying
- Score: 6–2, 7–5

Events
Singles	men	women
Doubles	men	women
← 2016 ·	Kunming Open	· 2018 →

Wang Yafan and Zhang Kailin were the defending champions, but Wang chose not to participate. Zhang partnered Yang Zhaoxuan, but lost to Han Xinyun and Ye Qiuyu in the quarterfinals.

Han and Ye won the title, defeating Prarthana Thombare and Xun Fangying in the final, 6–2, 7–5.

== Seeds ==
1. (Japan) Eri Hozumi / (Japan) Miyu Kato (first round)
2. (China) Yang Zhaoxuan / (China) Zhang Kailin (quarterfinals)
3. (Australia) Jessica Moore / (Thailand) Varatchaya Wongteanchai (quarterfinals)
4. (Japan) Hiroko Kuwata / (China) Zhu Lin (quarterfinals)

== Draw ==
=== Key ===
- Q = Qualifier
- WC = Wild card
- LL = Lucky loser
- Alt = Alternate
- SE = Special exempt
- PR = Protected ranking
- ITF = ITF entry
- JE = Junior exempt
- w/o = Walkover
- r = Retired
- d = Defaulted
- SR = Special ranking

First round
1	(Japan) E Hozumi (Japan) M Kato	6	3	[12]
(India) P Thombare (China) F Xun	2	6	[14]
(China) X Gao (China) Y Li	6	4	[10]
(Japan) M Ayukawa (China) Jiaj Lu	1	6	[7]
4	(Japan) H Kuwata (China) L Zhu	2	7	[10]
(Japan) K Okamura (Thailand) P Plipuech	6	5	[2]
(China) X Sun (China) Y Wang	3	6	[10]
WC	(China) T Pei (China) Y Zhang	6	2	[2]
(Russia) A Gasanova (Australia) Ar Rodionova	7^{7}	4	[4]
(Australia) M Adamczak (Chinese Taipei) C-w Chan	6^{3}	6	[10]
(Greece) V Grammatikopoulou (Japan) A Okuno	1	0
3	(Australia) J Moore (Thailand) V Wongteanchai	6	6
(China) X Han (China) Q Ye	7^{7}	3	[10]
(United States) J Cako (Israel) J Glushko	6^{5}	6	[8]
(China) J Kang (China) Jiax Lu	3	4
2	(China) Z Yang (China) K Zhang	6	6

Quarterfinals
(India) P Thombare (China) F Xun	6^{5}	6	[10]
(China) X Gao (China) Y Li	7^{7}	2	[7]
4	(Japan) H Kuwata (China) L Zhu	5	6	[10]
(China) X Sun (China) Y Wang	7	2	[12]
(Australia) M Adamczak (Chinese Taipei) C-w Chan	2	6	[10]
3	(Australia) J Moore (Thailand) V Wongteanchai	6	3	[4]
(China) X Han (China) Q Ye	6	6
2	(China) Z Yang (China) K Zhang	2	4

Semifinals
(India) P Thombare (China) F Xun	6	6
(China) X Sun (China) Y Wang	4	3
(Australia) M Adamczak (Chinese Taipei) C-w Chan	6	3	[9]
(China) X Han (China) Q Ye	2	6	[11]

Final
(India) P Thombare (China) F Xun	2	5
(China) X Han (China) Q Ye	6	7
