= 2018 Kunming Open – Women's doubles =

Women's doubles
- 2018 Kunming Open

Final
- Champions: (Slovenia) Dalila Jakupović (Russia) Irina Khromacheva
- Runners-up: (China) Guo Hanyu (China) Sun Xuliu
- Score: 6–1, 6–1

Events
Singles	men	women
Doubles	men	women
← 2017 ·	Kunming Open	· 2019 →

Han Xinyun and Ye Qiuyu were the defending champions, but they lost in the first round to Shérazad Reix and Ayano Shimizu.

Dalila Jakupović and Irina Khromacheva won the title after defeating Guo Hanyu and Sun Xuliu 6–1, 6–1 in the final.

== Seeds ==
1. (Slovenia) Dalila Jakupović / (Russia) Irina Khromacheva (champions)
2. (China) Han Xinyun / (China) Ye Qiuyu (first round)
3. (China) Jiang Xinyu / (China) Tang Qianhui (first round)
4. (India) Prarthana Thombare / (China) Xun Fangying (first round)

== Draw ==
=== Key ===
- Q = Qualifier
- WC = Wild card
- LL = Lucky loser
- Alt = Alternate
- SE = Special exempt
- PR = Protected ranking
- ITF = ITF entry
- JE = Junior exempt
- w/o = Walkover
- r = Retired
- d = Defaulted
- SR = Special ranking

=== Draw ===
First round
1	(Slovenia) D Jakupović (Russia) I Khromacheva	6	6
(China) S Guo (India) A Raina	3	3
(Japan) N Hanatani (Russia) N Kukharchuk	6	5	[10]
(Serbia) N Kostić (Japan) M Ozeki	3	7	[1]
3	(China) X Jiang (China) Q Tang	7^{7}	1	[9]
(United States) J Cako (Uzbekistan) S Sharipova	6^{3}	6	[11]
WC	(China) J Ren (China) W Zheng	1	1
(France) A Hesse (Canada) C Zhao	6	6
(Thailand) P Plipuech (Australia) O Tjandramulia	6^{5}	3
(China) H Guo (China) X Sun	7^{7}	6
(Bulgaria) E Kostova (Bulgaria) A Naydenova	7	4	[10]
4	(India) P Thombare (China) F Xun	5	6	[7]
(Indonesia) B Gumulya (China) X You	6	6^{7}	[4]
(China) S Feng (China) J Kang	4	7^{9}	[10]
(France) S Reix (Japan) A Shimizu	6	5	[13]
2	(China) X Han (China) Q Ye	3	7	[11]

Quarterfinals
1	(Slovenia) D Jakupović (Russia) I Khromacheva	6	6
(Japan) N Hanatani (Russia) N Kukharchuk	2	3
(United States) J Cako (Uzbekistan) S Sharipova	5	6	[3]
(France) A Hesse (Canada) C Zhao	7	3	[10]
(China) H Guo (China) X Sun	6	6
(Bulgaria) E Kostova (Bulgaria) A Naydenova	4	3
(China) S Feng (China) J Kang	6	6
(France) S Reix (Japan) A Shimizu	4	1

Semifinals
1	(Slovenia) D Jakupović (Russia) I Khromacheva	6	6
(France) A Hesse (Canada) C Zhao	1	2
(China) H Guo (China) X Sun	6	6
(China) S Feng (China) J Kang	1	1

Final
1	(Slovenia) D Jakupović (Russia) I Khromacheva	6	6
(China) H Guo (China) X Sun	1	1
