= 2016 Kunming Open – Women's singles =

Women's singles
- 2016 Kunming Open

Final
- Champion: (China) Zhang Kailin
- Runner-up: (China) Peng Shuai
- Score: 6–1, 0–6, 4–2, retired

Events
Singles	men	women
Doubles	men	women
← 2015 ·	Kunming Open	· 2017 →

Zheng Saisai, the reigning champion, made the decision to compete in Madrid instead of defending her title.

Zhang Kailin won the championship by defeating Peng Shuai in the final match. The final scoreline read 6–1, 0–6, 4–2, with Peng Shuai ultimately retiring from the match.

== Seeds ==
1. (China) Zhang Shuai (first round)
2. (China) Han Xinyun (semifinals)
3. (China) Wang Yafan (second round)
4. (China) Zhang Kailin (champion)
5. (China) Yang Zhaoxuan (first round)
6. (China) Liu Chang (semifinals, retired)
7. (China) Lu Jiajing (first round)
8. (Russia) Viktoria Kamenskaya (quarterfinals)

== Main draw ==
=== Key ===
- Q = Qualifier
- WC = Wild card
- LL = Lucky loser
- Alt = Alternate
- SE = Special exempt
- PR = Protected ranking
- ITF = ITF entry
- JE = Junior exempt
- w/o = Walkover
- r = Retired
- d = Defaulted
- SR = Special ranking

=== Finals ===
Semifinals
6	(China) Liu Chang	5	0^{r}
WC	(China) Peng Shuai	7	0
4	(China) Zhang Kailin	4	6	6
2	(China) Han Xinyun	6	3	4

Final
WC	(China) Peng Shuai	1	6	2^{r}
4	(China) Zhang Kailin	6	0	4

=== Top half ===
First round
1/WC	(China) S Zhang	4	4
(Serbia) N Stojanović	6	6
(Oman) F Al-Nabhani	3	3
(Australia) J Moore	6	6
Q	(China) S Guo	6	6
Q	(China) A Gai	3	4
(Poland) K Kawa	3	0
6	(China) C Liu	6	6
3	(China) Y Wang	6	6
Q	(China) Q Ye	3	3
WC	(China) S Peng	6	6
(China) R Tian	0	2
(China) X Gao	4	2
(United States) L Albanese	6	6
(Bulgaria) A Naydenova	6	6
7	(China) J Lu	2	2

Second round
(Serbia) N Stojanović	6^{2}	6^{3}
(Australia) J Moore	7^{7}	7^{7}
Q	(China) S Guo	5	4
6	(China) C Liu	7	6
3	(China) Y Wang	1	6^{3}
WC	(China) S Peng	6	7^{7}
(United States) L Albanese	2	4
(Bulgaria) A Naydenova	6	6

Quarterfinals
(Australia) J Moore	5	6^{2}
6	(China) C Liu	7	7^{7}
WC	(China) S Peng	7	6
(Bulgaria) A Naydenova	5	3

Semifinals
6	(China) C Liu	5	0^{r}
WC	(China) S Peng	7	0

=== Bottom half ===
First round
8	(Russia) V Kamenskaya	6	6
(Japan) J Namigata	0	0
(China) X Sun	6	6
(Hong Kong) L Zhang	4	4
WC	(China) D Zhao	2	4
(Thailand) V Wongteanchai	6	6
Q	(France) H Tan	1	6	4
4	(China) K Zhang	6	3	6
5	(China) Z Yang	1	6	2
WC	(China) F Xun	6	1	6
(China) S Xu	6	7^{9}
(Russia) E Yashina	1	6^{7}
(Kazakhstan) K Kerimbayeva	6	3	3
(India) A Raina	3	6	6
(China) X You	7^{7}	1	4
2	(China) X Han	6^{4}	6	6

Second round
8	(Russia) V Kamenskaya	6	6
(China) X Sun	1	2
(Thailand) V Wongteanchai	6^{3}	6	2
4	(China) K Zhang	7^{7}	1	6
WC	(China) F Xun	3	7^{7}	2
(China) S Xu	6	6^{2}	6
(India) A Raina	2	1
2	(China) X Han	6	6

Quarterfinals
8	(Russia) V Kamenskaya	6	5	4
4	(China) K Zhang	2	7	6
(China) S Xu	5	5
2	(China) X Han	7	7

Semifinals
4	(China) K Zhang	4	6	6
2	(China) X Han	6	3	4
