= 2017 Kunming Open – Men's singles =

Men's singles
- 2017 Kunming Open

Final
- Champion: (Serbia) Janko Tipsarević
- Runner-up: (France) Quentin Halys
- Score: 6–7^{(5–7)}, 6–3, 6–4

Events
Singles	men	women
Doubles	men	women
← 2016 ·	Kunming Open	· 2018 →

Jordan Thompson was the defending champion but lost in the quarterfinals to Quentin Halys.

Janko Tipsarević won the title after defeating Quentin Halys 6–7^{(5–7)}, 6–3, 6–4 in the final.

== Seeds ==
1. (Australia) Jordan Thompson (quarterfinals)
2. (Serbia) Janko Tipsarević (champion)
3. (Italy) Luca Vanni (first round)
4. (Slovakia) Andrej Martin (quarterfinals)
5. (Slovenia) Blaž Kavčič (quarterfinals)
6. (France) Quentin Halys (final)
7. (France) Mathias Bourgue (first round, retired)
8. (Russia) Teymuraz Gabashvili (second round)

== Draw ==
=== Key ===
- Q = Qualifier
- WC = Wild card
- LL = Lucky loser
- Alt = Alternate
- SE = Special exempt
- PR = Protected ranking
- ITF = ITF entry
- JE = Junior exempt
- w/o = Walkover
- r = Retired
- d = Defaulted
- SR = Special ranking

=== Finals ===
Semifinals
6	(France) Quentin Halys	6	4	6
SE	(Germany) Oscar Otte	3	6	3
Q	(Argentina) Juan Pablo Paz	4	3
2	(Serbia) Janko Tipsarević	6	6

Final
6	(France) Quentin Halys	7^{7}	3	4
2	(Serbia) Janko Tipsarević	6^{5}	6	6

=== Top half ===
First round
1	(Australia) J Thompson	5	6	7^{7}
(Belarus) I Ivashka	7	3	6^{5}
(Italy) T Fabbiano	2	6	6
(Kazakhstan) A Nedovyesov	6	2	2
WC	(China) Y Bai	6	6
PR	(Spain) D Muñoz de la Nava	4	4
(Japan) A Santillan	6^{5}	6	5
6	(France) Q Halys	7^{7}	4	7
4	(Slovakia) A Martin	6	3	6
(Russia) A Kudryavtsev	1	6	1
(China) Z Zhang	5	1
(Poland) K Majchrzak	7	6
SE	(Germany) O Otte	4	6	6
Q	(India) P Gunneswaran	6	3	4
Q	(Italy) G Quinzi	3
7	(France) M Bourgue	0^{r}

Second round
1	(Australia) J Thompson	6	6
(Italy) T Fabbiano	3	4
WC	(China) Y Bai	2	1
6	(France) Q Halys	6	6
4	(Slovakia) A Martin	6	6
(Poland) K Majchrzak	3	2
SE	(Germany) O Otte	6	6
Q	(Italy) G Quinzi	2	3

Quarterfinals
1	(Australia) J Thompson	3	4
6	(France) Q Halys	6	6
4	(Slovakia) A Martin	7^{7}	2	2
SE	(Germany) O Otte	6^{5}	6	6

Semifinals
6	(France) Q Halys	6	4	6
SE	(Germany) O Otte	3	6	3

=== Bottom half ===
First round
8	(Russia) T Gabashvili	6	5	7^{7}
(Serbia) N Milojević	1	7	6^{1}
(Switzerland) M Chiudinelli	2	1
Q	(Argentina) JP Paz	6	6
(Australia) A Whittington	6	2	7
(Belgium) K Coppejans	3	6	5
(China) D Wu	6	6
3	(Italy) L Vanni	2	2
5	(Slovenia) B Kavčič	6	7
WC	(China) Y He	2	5
(Serbia) M Tepavac	2	6	6
Q	(Canada) F Auger-Aliassime	6	4	4
(Chinese Taipei) J Jung	7	7
WC	(China) Xia Zihao	5	5
WC	(China) F Sun	0	4
2	(Serbia) J Tipsarević	6	6

Second round
8	(Russia) T Gabashvili	4	5
Q	(Argentina) JP Paz	6	7
(Australia) A Whittington	6	4	2
(China) D Wu	2	6	6
5	(Slovenia) B Kavčič	7^{8}	6
(Serbia) M Tepavac	6^{6}	4
(Chinese Taipei) J Jung	5	2
2	(Serbia) J Tipsarević	7	6

Quarterfinals
Q	(Argentina) JP Paz	2	7	6
(China) D Wu	6	5	4
5	(Slovenia) B Kavčič	1	4
2	(Serbia) J Tipsarević	6	6

Semifinals
Q	(Argentina) JP Paz	4	3
2	(Serbia) J Tipsarević	6	6
