= 2018 Kunming Open – Men's doubles =

Men's doubles
- 2018 Kunming Open

Final
- Champions: (Belarus) Aliaksandr Bury (South Africa) Lloyd Harris
- Runners-up: (China) Gong Maoxin (China) Zhang Ze
- Score: 6–3, 6–4

Events
Singles	men	women
Doubles	men	women
← 2017 ·	Kunming Open	· 2019 →

Dino Marcan and Tristan-Samuel Weissborn were the defending champions but chose not to defend their title.

Aliaksandr Bury and Lloyd Harris won the title after defeating Gong Maoxin and Zhang Ze 6–3, 6–4 in the final.

== Seeds ==
1. (India) Sriram Balaji / (India) Vishnu Vardhan (quarterfinals)
2. (Australia) Alex Bolt / (Australia) Luke Saville (quarterfinals)
3. (Australia) Matt Reid / (Australia) Andrew Whittington (semifinals)
4. (Philippines) Ruben Gonzales / (Japan) Toshihide Matsui (first round)

== Draw ==
=== Key ===
- Q = Qualifier
- WC = Wild card
- LL = Lucky loser
- Alt = Alternate
- SE = Special exempt
- PR = Protected ranking
- ITF = ITF entry
- JE = Junior exempt
- w/o = Walkover
- r = Retired
- d = Defaulted
- SR = Special ranking

First round
(Spain) R Ortega Olmedo (India) R Ramanathan
(China) M Gong (China) Ze Zhang	w/o
4	(Philippines) R Gonzales (Japan) T Matsui	3	4
WC	(China) Wang Ruikai (China) Wang Ruixuan	6	6
(China) Y Bai (China) Z Li	6	6
(France) A Escoffier (France) H Grenier	3	4
(Chinese Taipei) T Chen (Chinese Taipei) C-h Yi	7^{7}	6
(Egypt) M Safwat (Chinese Taipei) T-h Yang	6^{3}	4
(China) Li Yuanfeng (Czech Republic) V Šafránek	4	7^{9}	[8]
3	(Australia) M Reid (Australia) A Whittington	6	6^{7}	[10]
(Belarus) A Bury (South Africa) L Harris	6	6
(China) D Wu (China) Y Wu	4	3
(Russia) E Donskoy (Kazakhstan) A Nedovyesov	3	4
2	(Australia) A Bolt (Australia) L Saville	6	6

Quarterfinals
1	(India) S Balaji (India) V Vardhan	4	6	[6]
(China) M Gong (China) Ze Zhang	6	3	[10]
WC	(China) Ruik Wang (China) Ruix Wang	3	6^{3}
(China) Y Bai (China) Z Li	6	7^{7}
(Chinese Taipei) T Chen (Chinese Taipei) C-h Yi	6^{5}	4
3	(Australia) M Reid (Australia) A Whittington	7^{7}	6
(Belarus) A Bury (South Africa) L Harris	7	6
2	(Australia) A Bolt (Australia) L Saville	5	3

Semifinals
(China) M Gong (China) Ze Zhang	7^{9}	5	[10]
(China) Y Bai (China) Z Li	6^{7}	7	[7]
3	(Australia) M Reid (Australia) A Whittington	6	3	[8]
(Belarus) A Bury (South Africa) L Harris	3	6	[10]

Final
(China) M Gong (China) Ze Zhang	3	4
(Belarus) A Bury (South Africa) L Harris	6	6
