= 2017 Kunming Open – Men's doubles =

Men's doubles
- 2017 Kunming Open

Final
- Champions: (Croatia) Dino Marcan (Austria) Tristan-Samuel Weissborn
- Runners-up: (Australia) Steven de Waard (Slovenia) Blaž Kavčič
- Score: 5–7, 6–3, [10–7]

Events
Singles	men	women
Doubles	men	women
← 2016 ·	Kunming Open	· 2018 →

Bai Yan and Riccardo Ghedin were the defending champions but chose to defend their title with different partners. Bai partnered Wu Di but lost in the quarterfinals to Hans Podlipnik-Castillo and Andrei Vasilevski. Ghedin partnered Quentin Halys but lost in the first round to Bai and Wu.

Dino Marcan and Tristan-Samuel Weissborn won the title after defeating Steven de Waard and Blaž Kavčič 5–7, 6–3, [10–7] in the final.

== Seeds ==
1. (United States) James Cerretani / (Austria) Philipp Oswald (first round)
2. (Germany) Andre Begemann / (Australia) Andrew Whittington (first round)
3. (Chile) Hans Podlipnik-Castillo / (Belarus) Andrei Vasilevski (semifinals)
4. (Croatia) Dino Marcan / (Austria) Tristan-Samuel Weissborn (champions)

== Draw ==
=== Key ===
- Q = Qualifier
- WC = Wild card
- LL = Lucky loser
- Alt = Alternate
- SE = Special exempt
- PR = Protected ranking
- ITF = ITF entry
- JE = Junior exempt
- w/o = Walkover
- r = Retired
- d = Defaulted
- SR = Special ranking

First round
1	(United States) J Cerretani (Austria) P Oswald	6^{5}	2
(Chinese Taipei) J Jung (Chinese Taipei) C-h Yi	7^{7}	6
(Belarus) A Bury (Ukraine) D Molchanov	5	3
(Slovakia) A Martin (Kazakhstan) A Nedovyesov	7	6
4	(Croatia) D Marcan (Austria) T-S Weissborn	6	6
(Russia) T Gabashvili (United States) A Krajicek	4	4
WC	(China) Cai Wei (China) Zh Zhang	6	6
(Chinese Taipei) C-p Hsieh (Chinese Taipei) H-y Peng	3	4
WC	(China) Y Bai (China) D Wu	6	4	[10]
(Italy) R Ghedin (France) Q Halys	4	6	[8]
(China) M Gong (China) Ze Zhang	3	6^{1}
3	(Chile) H Podlipnik-Castillo (Belarus) A Vasilevski	6	7^{7}
(Australia) S de Waard (Slovenia) B Kavčič	4	6	[10]
(Italy) T Fabbiano (Italy) L Vanni	6	3	[8]
WC	(China) Wang Ruikai (China) Wang Ruixuan	6	3	[11]
2	(Germany) A Begemann (Australia) A Whittington	4	6	[9]

Quarterfinals
(Chinese Taipei) J Jung (Chinese Taipei) C-h Yi	2	2
(Slovakia) A Martin (Kazakhstan) A Nedovyesov	6	6
4	(Croatia) D Marcan (Austria) T-S Weissborn	7^{7}	6
WC	(China) W Cai (China) Zh Zhang	6^{4}	1
WC	(China) Y Bai (China) D Wu	6^{3}	7^{7}	[5]
3	(Chile) H Podlipnik-Castillo (Belarus) A Vasilevski	7^{7}	6^{1}	[10]
(Australia) S de Waard (Slovenia) B Kavčič	6	6
WC	(China) Ruik Wang (China) Ruix Wang	4	3

Semifinals
(Slovakia) A Martin (Kazakhstan) A Nedovyesov	3	6	[7]
4	(Croatia) D Marcan (Austria) T-S Weissborn	6	3	[10]
3	(Chile) H Podlipnik-Castillo (Belarus) A Vasilevski	6	4	[8]
(Australia) S de Waard (Slovenia) B Kavčič	2	6	[10]

Final
4	(Croatia) D Marcan (Austria) T-S Weissborn	5	6	[10]
(Australia) S de Waard (Slovenia) B Kavčič	7	3	[7]
