= 2016 Kunming Open – Men's singles =

Men's singles
- 2016 Kunming Open

Final
- Champion: (Australia) Jordan Thompson
- Runner-up: (France) Mathias Bourgue
- Score: 6–3, 6–2

Events
Singles	men	women
Doubles	men	women
← 2015 ·	Kunming Open	· 2017 →

Franko Škugor was the defending champion but chose not to participate.

Jordan Thompson won the title after defeating Mathias Bourgue 6–3, 6–2 in the final.

== Seeds ==
1. (Japan) Yoshihito Nishioka (first round)
2. (Australia) Jordan Thompson (champion)
3. (India) Saketh Myneni (semifinals, retired)
4. (Slovenia) Grega Žemlja (second round)
5. (United States) Alexander Sarkissian (first round)
6. (China) Zhang Ze (second round)
7. (France) Mathias Bourgue (final)
8. (Belgium) Arthur De Greef (quarterfinals)

== Draw ==
=== Key ===
- Q = Qualifier
- WC = Wild card
- LL = Lucky loser
- Alt = Alternate
- SE = Special exempt
- PR = Protected ranking
- ITF = ITF entry
- JE = Junior exempt
- w/o = Walkover
- r = Retired
- d = Defaulted
- SR = Special ranking

=== Finals ===
Semifinals
7	(France) Mathias Bourgue	6	3
3	(India) Saketh Myneni	0	1^{r}
(Kazakhstan) Aleksandr Nedovyesov	6	3	2
2	(Australia) Jordan Thompson	4	6	6

Final
7	(France) Mathias Bourgue	3	2
2	(Australia) Jordan Thompson	6	6

=== Top half ===
First round
1/Q	(Japan) Y Nishioka	5	6^{2}
(Australia) A Whittington	7	7^{7}
(Ukraine) D Molchanov	4	6^{11}
Q	(Germany) Y Hanfmann	6	7^{13}
(Spain) E López-Pérez	7^{7}	6
Q	(Australia) M Reid	6^{2}	3
(Czech Republic) V Šafránek	1	4
7	(France) M Bourgue	6	6
3	(India) S Myneni	6	6
(South Korea) D-h Lee	4	3
(Colombia) N Barrientos	6	7^{7}
(Serbia) D Petrović	4	6^{3}
WC	(China) Xia Zihao	2	2
WC	(China) Y He	6	6
(Serbia) N Milojević	6^{4}	6^{4}
8	(Belgium) A De Greef	7^{7}	7^{7}

Second round
(Australia) A Whittington	7	6
Q	(Germany) Y Hanfmann	5	2
(Spain) E López-Pérez	2^{r}
7	(France) M Bourgue	5
3	(India) S Myneni	6	7^{7}
(Colombia) N Barrientos	3	6^{4}
WC	(China) Y He	6^{5}	3
8	(Belgium) A De Greef	7^{7}	6

Quarterfinals
(Australia) A Whittington	1	4
7	(France) M Bourgue	6	6
3	(India) S Myneni	6	6
8	(Belgium) A De Greef	1	3

Semifinals
7	(France) M Bourgue	6	3
3	(India) S Myneni	0	1^{r}

=== Bottom half ===
First round
6	(China) Z Zhang	6	6
(China) Y Bai	0	4
WC	(China) R Te	2	2
(Kazakhstan) A Nedovyesov	6	6
Q	(Australia) G Jones	5	7^{8}	6^{2}
(Austria) B Trinker	7	6^{6}	7^{7}
(Serbia) M Zekić	6^{3}	6	5
4	(Slovenia) G Žemlja	7^{7}	4	7
5	(United States) A Sarkissian	4	5
(Spain) R Ramírez Hidalgo	6	7
(Australia) M Banes	6	6
(Australia) Gavin van Peperzeel	0	1
(Germany) D Masur	6	5	6^{5}
WC	(China) B Ouyang	3	7	7^{7}
(China) Z Li	0	4
2	(Australia) J Thompson	6	6

Second round
6	(China) Z Zhang	6^{4}	6^{6}
(Kazakhstan) A Nedovyesov	7^{7}	7^{8}
(Austria) B Trinker	6	7^{9}
4	(Slovenia) G Žemlja	4	6^{7}
(Spain) R Ramírez Hidalgo	7^{7}	6
(Australia) M Banes	6^{4}	3
WC	(China) B Ouyang	3	4
2	(Australia) J Thompson	6	6

Quarterfinals
(Kazakhstan) A Nedovyesov	6	6
(Austria) B Trinker	4	2
(Spain) R Ramírez Hidalgo	3	7^{7}	6^{9}
2	(Australia) J Thompson	6	6^{5}	7^{11}

Semifinals
(Kazakhstan) A Nedovyesov	6	3	2
2	(Australia) J Thompson	4	6	6
