= 2018 Kunming Open – Men's singles =

Men's singles
- 2018 Kunming Open

Final
- Champion: (India) Prajnesh Gunneswaran
- Runner-up: (Egypt) Mohamed Safwat
- Score: 5–7, 6–3, 6–1

Events
Singles	men	women
Doubles	men	women
← 2017 ·	Kunming Open	· 2019 →

Janko Tipsarević was the defending champion but chose not to defend his title.

Prajnesh Gunneswaran won the title after defeating Mohamed Safwat 5–7, 6–3, 6–1 in the final.

== Seeds ==
1. (Canada) Vasek Pospisil (second round)
2. (Russia) Evgeny Donskoy (first round)
3. (Australia) Jordan Thompson (semifinals)
4. (India) Ramkumar Ramanathan (first round)
5. (France) Quentin Halys (first round)
6. (France) Calvin Hemery (second round)
7. (Australia) Alex Bolt (first round)
8. (South Korea) Kwon Soon-woo (quarterfinals)

== Draw ==
=== Key ===
- Q = Qualifier
- WC = Wild card
- LL = Lucky loser
- Alt = Alternate
- SE = Special exempt
- PR = Protected ranking
- ITF = ITF entry
- JE = Junior exempt
- w/o = Walkover
- r = Retired
- d = Defaulted
- SR = Special ranking

=== Finals ===
Semifinals
(Poland) Kamil Majchrzak	6	3	1
(India) Prajnesh Gunneswaran	0	6	6
3	(Australia) Jordan Thompson	6	4	3
(Egypt) Mohamed Safwat	2	6	6

Final
(India) Prajnesh Gunneswaran	5	6	6
(Egypt) Mohamed Safwat	7	3	1

=== Top half ===
First round
1	(Canada) V Pospisil	6	6
(Turkey) C İlkel	4	1
(Czech Republic) V Šafránek	3	6	3
(South Africa) L Harris	6	4	6
(Chinese Taipei) T-h Yang	6	4	6
(Kazakhstan) A Nedovyesov	4	6	0
(Poland) K Majchrzak	7^{7}	6
7	(Australia) A Bolt	6^{3}	2
4	(India) R Ramanathan	4	6^{5}
(Australia) A Whittington	6	7^{7}
LL	(France) H Grenier	2	1
(India) P Gunneswaran	6	6
Q	(India) S Balaji	6	6^{5}	6
(China) Z Li	4	7^{7}	4
WC	(China) Wang Ruikai	2	4
8	(South Korea) S-w Kwon	6	6

Second round
1	(Canada) V Pospisil	5	4
(South Africa) L Harris	7	6
(Chinese Taipei) T-h Yang	6	3	2
(Poland) K Majchrzak	4	6	6
(Australia) A Whittington	4	4
(India) P Gunneswaran	6	6
Q	(India) S Balaji	4	5
8	(South Korea) S-w Kwon	6	7

Quarterfinals
(South Africa) L Harris	2	4
(Poland) K Majchrzak	6	6
(India) P Gunneswaran	6	6
8	(South Korea) S-w Kwon	2	3

Semifinals
(Poland) K Majchrzak	6	3	1
(India) P Gunneswaran	0	6	6

=== Bottom half ===
First round
5	(France) Q Halys	6	4	4
Q	(India) S Mukund	3	6	6
(South Korea) D-h Lee	6	7^{7}
WC	(China) Wang Ruixuan	2	6^{5}
(China) D Wu	6^{3}	3
Q	(South Korea) Y-s Chung	7^{7}	6
(Spain) R Ortega Olmedo	3	3
3	(Australia) J Thompson	6	6
6	(France) C Hemery	7^{7}	6
(China) Ze Zhang	6^{5}	3
WC	(China) Li Yuanfeng	3	4
WC	(China) Y Bai	6	6
(Egypt) M Safwat	3	7^{7}	6
Q	(India) V Vardhan	6	6^{4}	2
(China) Y Wu	6	4	6
2	(Russia) E Donskoy	4	6	3

Second round
Q	(India) S Mukund	6	7^{9}
(South Korea) D-h Lee	2	6^{7}
Q	(South Korea) Y-s Chung	3	4
3	(Australia) J Thompson	6	6
6	(France) C Hemery	4	5
WC	(China) Y Bai	6	7
(Egypt) M Safwat	1	6	6
(China) Y Wu	6	3	4

Quarterfinals
Q	(India) S Mukund	2	4
3	(Australia) J Thompson	6	6
WC	(China) Y Bai	1	3
(Egypt) M Safwat	6	6

Semifinals
3	(Australia) J Thompson	6	4	3
(Egypt) M Safwat	2	6	6
