= 2016 Kunming Open – Men's doubles =

Men's doubles
- 2016 Kunming Open

Final
- Champion: (China) Bai Yan (Italy) Riccardo Ghedin
- Runner-up: (Ukraine) Denys Molchanov (Kazakhstan) Aleksandr Nedovyesov
- Score: 4–6, 6–3, [10–6]

Events
Singles	men	women
Doubles	men	women
← 2015 ·	Kunming Open	· 2017 →

Bai Yan and Wu Di were the defending champions but only Bai chose to defend his title, partnering Riccardo Ghedin. They won the title after defeating Denys Molchanov and Aleksandr Nedovyesov 4–6, 6–3, [10–6] in the final.

== Seeds ==
1. (China) Bai Yan / (Italy) Riccardo Ghedin (champions)
2. (United States) James Cerretani / (United States) Max Schnur (semifinals)
3. (Colombia) Nicolás Barrientos / (Uruguay) Ariel Behar (semifinals)
4. (India) Mahesh Bhupathi / (India) Saketh Myneni (first round)

== Draw ==
=== Key ===
- Q = Qualifier
- WC = Wild card
- LL = Lucky loser
- Alt = Alternate
- SE = Special exempt
- PR = Protected ranking
- ITF = ITF entry
- JE = Junior exempt
- w/o = Walkover
- r = Retired
- d = Defaulted
- SR = Special ranking

First round
1	(China) Y Bai (Italy) R Ghedin	7	6
WC	(China) Wang Ruikai (China) Wang Ruixuan	5	1
WC	(China) Y He (China) Wang Aoxiong	7^{11}	2	[7]
(Australia) J Thompson (Australia) A Whittington	6^{9}	6	[10]
3	(Colombia) N Barrientos (Uruguay) A Behar	6	6
(Australia) M Banes (Australia) Gavin van Peperzeel	3	3
(Germany) Y Hanfmann (Germany) D Masur	3	7^{8}	[10]
(Serbia) D Petrović (Austria) B Trinker	6	6^{6}	[6]
(Australia) G Jones (Canada) F Peliwo	6	6
WC	(China) Z Qiu (China) R Te	4	3
(Ukraine) D Molchanov (Kazakhstan) A Nedovyesov	6	6
4	(India) M Bhupathi (India) S Myneni	4	4
(Serbia) N Milojević (Serbia) M Zekić	6	6
(Australia) Jarryd Chaplin (United States) A Sarkissian	4	3
(Belgium) A De Greef (Australia) M Reid	4	7^{7}	[10]
2	(United States) J Cerretani (United States) M Schnur	6	6^{5}	[12]

Quarterfinals
1	(China) Y Bai (Italy) R Ghedin	6	6
(Australia) J Thompson (Australia) A Whittington	3	2
3	(Colombia) N Barrientos (Uruguay) A Behar	6	6
(Germany) Y Hanfmann (Germany) D Masur	4	4
(Australia) G Jones (Canada) F Peliwo
(Ukraine) D Molchanov (Kazakhstan) A Nedovyesov	w/o
(Serbia) N Milojević (Serbia) M Zekić	1	2
2	(United States) J Cerretani (United States) M Schnur	6	6

Semifinals
1	(China) Y Bai (Italy) R Ghedin	6	6
3	(Colombia) N Barrientos (Uruguay) A Behar	3	2
(Ukraine) D Molchanov (Kazakhstan) A Nedovyesov	6	6^{3}	[10]
2	(United States) J Cerretani (United States) M Schnur	4	7^{7}	[6]

Final
1	(China) Y Bai (Italy) R Ghedin	4	6	[10]
(Ukraine) D Molchanov (Kazakhstan) A Nedovyesov	6	3	[6]
