= Irina Khromacheva =

Russian tennis player (born 1995)

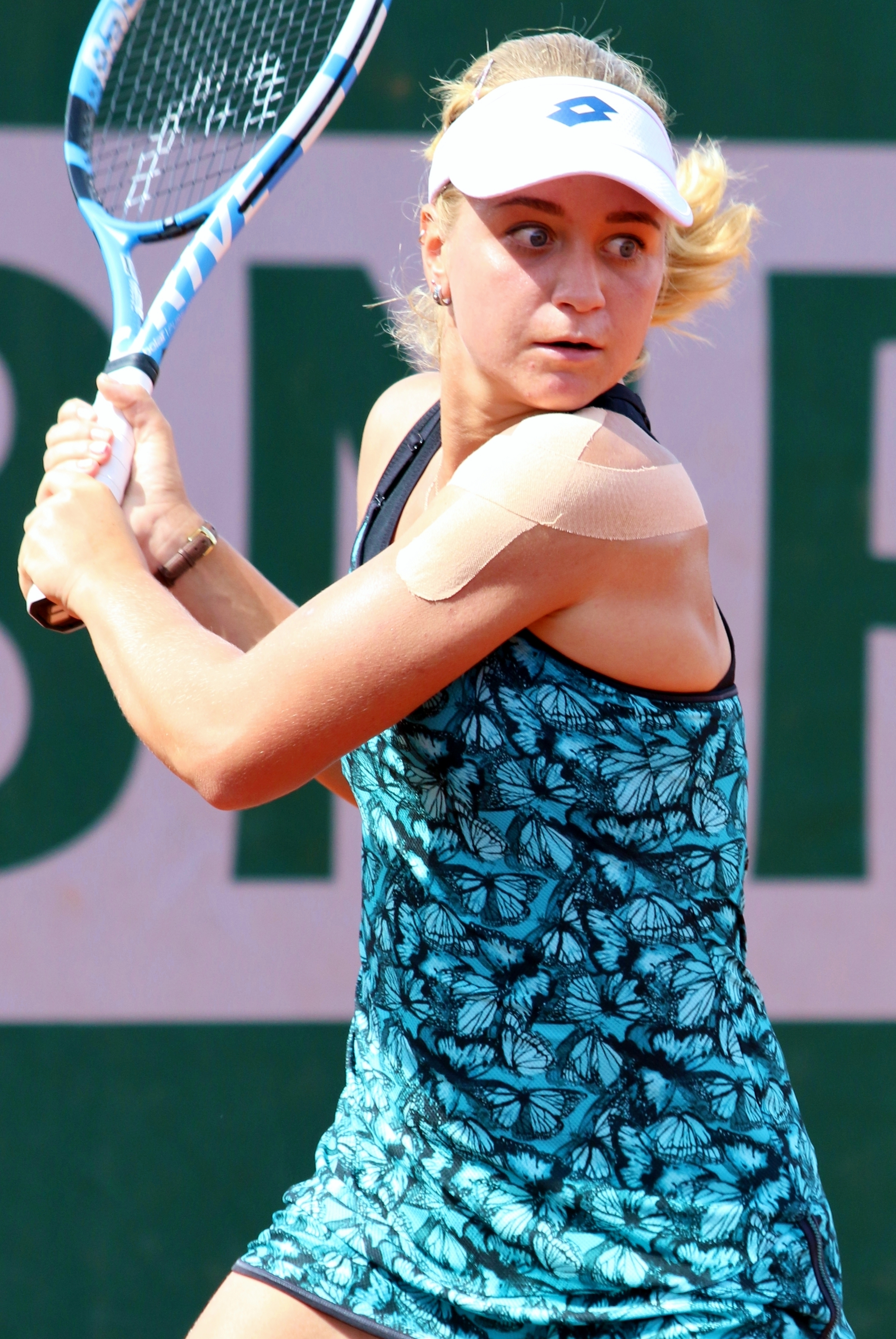
- Irina Khromacheva at the 2018 French Open
- Country (sports): Russia
- Residence: Maillen, Belgium
- Born: 12 May 1995 (age 31) Moscow, Russia
- Height: 1.70 m (5 ft 7 in)
- Plays: Left-handed (two-handed backhand)
- Coach: Larisa Savchenko
- Prize money: $1,751,978

Singles
- Career record: 362–236
- Career titles: 1 WTA 125
- Highest ranking: No. 89 (27 February 2017)

Grand Slam singles results
- Australian Open: 1R (2017)
- French Open: 1R (2017)
- Wimbledon: 1R (2017)
- US Open: 1R (2020)

Doubles
- Career record: 407–198
- Career titles: 12
- Highest ranking: No. 14 (3 March 2025)
- Current ranking: No. 48 (24 August 2026)

Grand Slam doubles results
- Australian Open: 2R (2018)
- French Open: 3R (2018)
- Wimbledon: 3R (2025, 2026)
- US Open: QF (2018, 2024)

Grand Slam mixed doubles results
- Australian Open: QF (2025, 2026)
- French Open: 2R (2026)
- Wimbledon: QF (2025)

Team competitions
- Fed Cup: 0–4
- Last updated on: 25 August 2026.

Irina Pavlovna Khromacheva (Russian: Ирина Павловна Хромачёва; born 12 May 1995) is a Russian professional tennis player who specializes in doubles. She has career-high WTA rankings of world No. 14 in doubles, achieved on 3 March 2025, and No. 89 in singles, reached on 27 February 2017.

== Personal life ==
Irina was born to Pavel and Natalya Khromacheva, on 12 May 1995 in Moscow. She trained at the Justine Henin Academy in Belgium. Khromacheva states that she doesn't have a favourite surface and likes everything. She started playing tennis at the age of four.

Khromacheva, after her unsuccessful partnership with a Belgian coach, is now coached by Larisa Savchenko in Riga.

== Career ==
=== 2010-2011: Juniors ===
Khromacheva had a breakthrough on the ITF Junior Circuit in 2008, winning her first title at the Zagreb Open.

In 2009, she won four junior titles and competed for the first time at the French Open and US Open, losing in the first round at both tournaments.

In 2010, she won four junior titles and became junior world No. 1 on 7 June. At Roland Garros, she lost 3–6, 2–6, in the semifinals to Ons Jabeur. At Wimbledon, she lost in the quarterfinals to Sachie Ishizu, 1–6, 2–6, and at the last junior Grand Slam tournament of the year, the US Open, she lost in the second round to Jabeur, 3–6, 3–6.

In 2011, she played the junior singles final of the Wimbledon Championships and lost to Ashleigh Barty in two sets; in the junior doubles draw, she reached the semifinals alongside partner Barbora Krejčíková.

=== 2019: Provisional suspension ===
Khromacheva was provisionally suspended by the Tennis Integrity Unit for one month in September 2019.

=== 2023: Second WTA Tour doubles title ===
At the Copa Colsanitas, Khromacheva won her second WTA Tour title alongside Iryna Shymanovich, for the second time at this tournament following her maiden title at the 2018 Copa Colsanitas with Dalila Jakupović.

Partnering Panna Udvardy, she won the doubles title at the Swedish Open, defeating Eri Hozumi and Jang Su-jeong in the final.

=== 2024: First WTA 500 and WTA 1000 titles, top 20 ===
At the WTA 500 2024 Guadalajara Open, she won the doubles title with Anna Danilina, defeating Oksana Kalashnikova and Kamilla Rakhimova in the final in a champions tie-break. Ranked No. 30, Khromacheva also won the title at the WTA 250 2024 Thailand Open 2 with Danilina, defeating Eudice Chong and Moyuka Uchijima in the final. Khromacheva and Danilina won their first WTA 1000 title at the 2024 Wuhan Open, defeating Asia Muhammad and Jessica Pegula in the final. As a result she moved to a new career-high in the top 20 in the doubles rankings on 14 October 2024.

=== 2025: Top 15, first grass court title ===
Partnering Linda Nosková, Khromacheva reached the doubles final at the Rouen Open in April, losing to Aleksandra Krunić and Sabrina Santamaria in straight sets. Alongside Fanny Stollár, she won the WTA 125 Trophée Clarins, defeating Tereza Mihalíková and Olivia Nicholls in the final.

Playing again with Stollár, she won the title at the grass-court Rosmalen Open in June, defeating Nicole Melichar-Martinez and Liudmila Samsonova in the final.

=== 2026: Twelfth career doubles title ===
As top seeds, Khromacheva partnered with Caroline Dolehide to win the Copa Colsanitas, defeating Valeriya Strakhova and Anastasia Tikhonova in the final. Teaming up with Anastasia Dețiuc, she won her 12th WTA Tour doubles title at the Iași Open, overcoming Alina Charaeva and Zhibek Kulambayeva in the final which went to a deciding champions tiebreak.

== Performance timelines ==
Key
W	F	SF	QF	#R	RR	Q#	DNQ	A	NH

(W) winner; (F) finalist; (SF) semifinalist; (QF) quarterfinalist; (#R) rounds 4, 3, 2, 1; (RR) round-robin stage; (Q#) qualification round; (DNQ) did not qualify; (A) absent; (NH) not held; (SR) strike rate (events won / competed); (W–L) win–loss record.
To avoid confusion and double counting, these charts are updated at the conclusion of a tournament or when the player's participation has ended.

=== Singles ===
Tournament	2011	2012	2013	2014	2015	2016	2017	2018	2019	2020	2021	2022	2023	W–L
Grand Slam tournaments
Australian Open	Q1	Q3	Q1	A	A	Q1	1R	Q1	Q3	A	A	A	Q1	0–1
French Open	A	A	Q2	A	A	Q3	1R	A	A	A	A	A	A	0–1
Wimbledon	A	A	A	A	A	Q3	1R	Q2	A	NH	A	A	A	0–1
US Open	A	Q1	A	A	A	Q1	A	Q1	A	1R	A	A	A	0–1
Win–loss	0–0	0–0	0–0	0–0	0–0	0–0	0–3	0–0	0–0	0–1	0–0	0–0	0–0	0–4
WTA 1000
Indian Wells Open	A	A	A	A	A	A	A	A	A	Q1	NH	A	A	0–0
Miami Open	A	A	Q1	Q2	A	A	Q1	A	A	NH	A	A	A	0–0

=== Doubles ===
Tournament	2017	2018	2019	2020	2021	2022	2023	2024	2025	SR	W–L	Win %
Grand Slam tournaments
Australian Open	A	2R	1R	A	A	A		1R	1R	0 / 4	1–4	20%
French Open	2R	3R	A	A	1R	A	2R	1R	1R	0 / 6	4–6	40%
Wimbledon	Q1	1R	A	NH	A	A	A	2R	3R	0 / 3	3–3	50%
US Open	A	QF	A	1R	A	A	2R	QF	1R	0 / 5	7–5	58%
Win–loss	1–1	6–4	0–1	0–1	0–1	0–0	2–2	4–4	2–4	0 / 18	15–18	45%
WTA 1000
Indian Wells Open	A	A	2R	NH	A	A	A	A	1R	0 / 2	1–2	33%
Miami Open	A	A	1R	NH	A	A	A	A	1R	0 / 2	0–2	0%
Wuhan Open								W	1R	1 / 1	5–1	83%

== Significant finals ==
=== WTA 1000 tournaments ===
==== Doubles: 1 (title) ====
Result	Year	Tournament	Surface	Partner	Opponents	Score
Win	2024	Wuhan Open	Hard	(Kazakhstan) Anna Danilina	(United States) Asia Muhammad (United States) Jessica Pegula	6–3, 7–6^{(8–6)}

== WTA Tour finals ==
=== Doubles: 17 (12 titles, 5 runner-ups) ===
Legend WTA 1000 (1–0) WTA 500 (2–2) WTA 250 (9–3)	Finals by surface Hard (4–1) Clay (7–4) Grass (1–0)

Result	W–L	Date	Tournament	Tier	Surface	Partner	Opponents	Score
Win	1–0	Apr 2018	Copa Colsanitas, Colombia	International (Note: The WTA International tournaments were reclassified as WTA 250 tournaments in 2021.)	Clay	(Slovenia) Dalila Jakupović	(Colombia) Mariana Duque Mariño (Argentina) Nadia Podoroska	6–3, 6–4
Loss	1–1	Apr 2019	Charleston Open, US	Premier (Note: The WTA Premier tournaments were reclassified as WTA 500 tournaments in 2021.)	Clay	(Russia) Veronika Kudermetova	(Germany) Anna-Lena Grönefeld (Poland) Alicja Rosolska	6–7^{(7)}, 2–6
Win	2–1	Apr 2023	Copa Colsanitas, Colombia (2)	WTA 250	Clay	Iryna Shymanovich	(Georgia (country)) Oksana Kalashnikova (Poland) Katarzyna Piter	6–1, 3–6, [10–6]
Loss	2–2	Apr 2024	Copa Colsanitas, Colombia	WTA 250	Clay	(Hungary) Anna Bondár	(Spain) Cristina Bucșa; Kamilla Rakhimova	6–7^{(5)}, 6–3, [8–10]
Win	3–2	Apr 2024	Open de Rouen, France	WTA 250	Clay (i)	(Hungary) Tímea Babos	(United Kingdom) Naiktha Bains (United Kingdom) Maia Lumsden	6–3, 6–4
Win	4–2	May 2024	Rabat Grand Prix, Morocco	WTA 250	Clay	Yana Sizikova	(Kazakhstan) Anna Danilina (China) Xu Yifan	6–3, 6–2
Loss	5–3	Jul 2024	Budapest Grand Prix, Hungary	WTA 250	Clay	(Kazakhstan) Anna Danilina	(Hungary) Fanny Stollár (Poland) Katarzyna Piter	3–6, 6–3, [3–10]
Win	5–2	Jul 2024	Iași Open, Romania	WTA 250	Clay	(Kazakhstan) Anna Danilina	Alexandra Panova; Yana Sizikova	6–4, 6–2
Win	6–3	Sep 2024	Guadalajara Open, Mexico	WTA 500	Hard	(Kazakhstan) Anna Danilina	(Georgia (country)) Oksana Kalashnikova; Kamilla Rakhimova	2–6, 7–5, [10–7]
Win	7–3	Sep 2024	Hua Hin Championships, Thailand	WTA 250	Hard	(Kazakhstan) Anna Danilina	(Hong Kong) Eudice Chong (Japan) Moyuka Uchijima	6–4, 7–5
Win	8–3	Oct 2024	Wuhan Open, China	WTA 1000	Hard	(Kazakhstan) Anna Danilina	(United States) Asia Muhammad (United States) Jessica Pegula	6–3, 7–6^{(6)}
Loss	8–4	Mar 2025	Mérida Open, Mexico	WTA 500	Hard	(Kazakhstan) Anna Danilina	(Poland) Katarzyna Piter (Egypt) Mayar Sherif	6–7^{(2)}, 5–7
Loss	8–5	Apr 2025	Open de Rouen, France	WTA 250	Clay (i)	(Czech Republic) Linda Nosková	(Serbia) Aleksandra Krunić (United States) Sabrina Santamaria	0–6, 4–6
Win	9–5	Jun 2025	Rosmalen Open, Netherlands	WTA 250	Grass	(Hungary) Fanny Stollár	(United States) Nicole Melichar-Martinez; Liudmila Samsonova	7–5, 6–3
Win	10–5	Sep 2025	Guadalajara Open, Mexico (2)	WTA 500	Hard	(United States) Nicole Melichar-Martinez	(Mexico) Giuliana Olmos (Indonesia) Aldila Sutjiadi	6–3, 6–4
Win	11–5	Apr 2026	Copa Colsanitas, Colombia	WTA 250	Clay	(United States) Caroline Dolehide	(Ukraine) Valeriya Strakhova; Anastasia Tikhonova	7–6^{(5)}, 6–4
Win	12–5	Jul 2026	Iași Open, Romania (2)	WTA 250	Clay	(Czech Republic) Anastasia Dețiuc	(Armenia) Alina Charaeva (Kazakhstan) Zhibek Kulambayeva	4–6, 6–2, [10–5]

== WTA 125 finals ==
=== Singles: 2 (1 title, 1 runner-up) ===
Result	W–L	Date	Tournament	Surface	Opponent	Score
Win	1–0	May 2018	Kunming Open, China	Clay	(China) Zheng Saisai	3–6, 6–4, 7–6^{(5)}
Loss	1–1	Nov 2018	Mumbai Open, India	Hard	(Thailand) Luksika Kumkhum	6–1, 2–6, 3–6

=== Doubles: 11 (6 titles, 5 runner-ups) ===
Result	W–L	Date	Tournament	Surface	Partner	Opponents	Score
Loss	0–1	Nov 2017	Hua Hin Challenger, Thailand	Hard	(Slovenia) Dalila Jakupović	(China) Duan Yingying (China) Wang Yafan	3–6, 3–6
Loss	0–2	Nov 2017	Mumbai Open, India	Hard	(Slovenia) Dalila Jakupović	(Mexico) Victoria Rodríguez (Netherlands) Bibiane Schoofs	5–7, 6–3, [7–10]
Win	1–2	May 2018	Kunming Open, China	Clay	(Slovenia) Dalila Jakupović	(China) Guo Hanyu (China) Sun Xuliu	6–1, 6–1
Loss	1–3	Jul 2022	Båstad Open, Sweden	Clay	(Romania) Mihaela Buzărnescu	(Japan) Misaki Doi (Sweden) Rebecca Peterson	w/o
Loss	1–4	Jun 2023	Internacional de Valencia, Spain	Clay	Angelina Gabueva	(Spain) Aliona Bolsova (Venezuela) Andrea Gámiz	4–6, 6–4, [7–10]
Win	2–4	Jul 2023	Båstad Open, Sweden	Clay	(Hungary) Panna Udvardy	(Japan) Eri Hozumi (South Korea) Jang Su-jeong	4–6, 6–3, [10–5]
Win	3–4	Sep 2023	Parma Open, Italy	Clay	(Slovenia) Dalila Jakupović	(Hungary) Anna Bondár (Belgium) Kimberley Zimmermann	6–2, 6–3
Win	4–4	May 2024	Parma Open, Italy	Clay	(Kazakhstan) Anna Danilina	(France) Elixane Lechemia (Brazil) Ingrid Martins	6–1, 6–2
Win	5–4	Jun 2024	Bari Open, Italy	Clay	(Kazakhstan) Anna Danilina	(Italy) Angelica Moratelli (Mexico) Renata Zarazúa	6–1, 6–3
Win	6–4	May 2025	Clarins Open, France	Clay	(Hungary) Fanny Stollár	(Slovakia) Tereza Mihalíková (United Kingdom) Olivia Nicholls	4–6, 7–6^{(5)}, [10–5]
Loss	6–5	Sep 2025	Guadalajara 125 Open, Mexico	Hard	Kamilla Rakhimova	Maria Kozyreva; Iryna Shymanovich	3–6, 4–6

== ITF Circuit finals ==
=== Singles: 29 (18 titles, 11 runner-ups) ===
Legend $50/60,000 tournaments (3–2) $25,000 tournaments (12–7) $10/15,000 tournaments (3–2)	Finals by surface Hard (6–5) Clay (11–6) Carpet (1–0)

Result	W–L	Date	Tournament	Tier	Surface	Opponent	Score
Win	1–0	Apr 2011	ITF Ribeirao Preto, Brazil	10,000	Clay	(Slovakia) Viktória Malová	6–1, 6–3
Win	2–0	May 2011	ITF Casarano, Italy	10,000	Clay	(Germany) Anne Schäfer	6–3, 6–4
Loss	2–1	Nov 2011	ITF Istanbul, Turkey	25,000	Hard	(Ukraine) Lesia Tsurenko	1–6, 5–7
Loss	2–2	Feb 2012	Burnie International, Australia	25,000	Hard	(Australia) Olivia Rogowska	3–6, 3–6
Win	3–2	Jun 2012	ITF Périgueux, France	25,000	Clay	(Puerto Rico) Monica Puig	6–3, 6–2
Win	4–2	Jun 2013	ITF Padova, Italy	25,000	Clay	(Austria) Patricia Mayr-Achleitner	6–2, 6–3
Loss	4–3	Jun 2013	Open de Montpellier, France	25,000	Clay	(Croatia) Ana Konjuh	3–6, 1–6
Win	5–3	Feb 2014	ITF Buenos Aires, Argentina	10,000	Clay	(South Africa) Chanel Simmonds	6–2, 7–5
Win	6–3	Jun 2014	ITF Minsk, Belarus	25,000	Clay	(Croatia) Ema Mikulčić	6–4, 1–6, 6–1
Win	7–3	Jun 2015	ITF Moscow, Russia	25,000	Clay	(Russia) Valentyna Ivakhnenko	6–2, 6–2
Loss	7–4	Nov 2015	ITF Casablanca, Morocco	25,000	Clay	(Austria) Melanie Klaffner	6–2, 6–7^{(7)}, 1–2 ret.
Win	8–4	Nov 2015	ITF Minsk, Belarus	25,000	Hard (i)	(Turkey) Başak Eraydın	6–2, 7–5
Win	9–4	Feb 2016	ITF Moscow, Russia	25,000	Hard (i)	(Russia) Yana Sizikova	6–7^{(7)}, 6–4, 6–3
Win	10–4	Mar 2016	ITF Puebla, México	25,000	Hard (i)	(Netherlands) Richèl Hogenkamp	6–3, 6–2
Win	11–4	May 2016	Open Saint-Gaudens, France	50,000	Clay	(Greece) Maria Sakkari	1–6, 7–6^{(3)}, 6–1
Win	12–4	Sep 2016	Budapest Pro Circuit Open, Hungary	50,000	Clay	(Netherlands) Cindy Burger	6–1, 6–2
Win	13–4	Nov 2016	ITF Pune, India	25,000	Hard	(Japan) Riko Sawayanagi	6–1, 6–1
Win	14–4	Mar 2017	ITF São Paulo, Brazil	25,000	Clay	(Brazil) Laura Pigossi	6–2, 6–1
Win	15–4	Oct 2017	ITF Óbidos, Portugal	25,000	Carpet	(Poland) Magdalena Fręch	6–1, 4–6, 6–4
Win	16–4	Feb 2018	ITF Perth, Australia	25,000	Hard	(United Kingdom) Katy Dunne	6–2, 6–3
Loss	16–5	Feb 2019	Launceston International, Australia	60,000	Hard	(Kazakhstan) Elena Rybakina	5–7, 3–3 ret.
Loss	16–6	Nov 2019	ITF Antalya, Turkey	15,000	Hard	(North Macedonia) Lina Gjorcheska	3–6, 6–3, 1–6
Loss	16–7	Mar 2021	ITF New Delhi, India	15,000	Hard	(Slovenia) Pia Lovrič	3–6, 4–6
Win	17–7	May 2021	Solgironès Open, Spain	60,000+H	Clay	(Netherlands) Arantxa Rus	6–4, 1–6, 7–6^{(8)}
Win	18–7	Jan 2022	ITF Monastir, Tunisia	25,000	Hard	(Switzerland) Arlinda Rushiti	1–6, 6–4, 7–5
Loss	18–8	May 2022	ITF Båstad, Sweden	25,000	Clay	(Turkey) İpek Öz	3–6, 1–6
Loss	18–9	May 2022	ITF Pula, Italy	25,000	Clay	(Latvia) Darja Semenistaja	4–6, 6–4, 1–6
Loss	18–10	Jul 2022	ITF Darmstadt, Germany	25,000	Clay	(Croatia) Antonia Ružić	3–6, 2–6
Loss	18–11	Dec 2022	Aberto da República, Brazil	60,000	Clay	Iryna Shymanovich	2–6, 7–5, 4–6

=== Doubles: 48 (33 titles, 15 runner-ups) ===
Legend $100,000 tournaments (1–0) $80,000 tournaments (1–1) $50/60,000 tournaments (5–7) $40,000 tournaments (1–0) $25,000 tournaments (22–6) $10,000 tournaments (3–1)	Finals by surface Hard (9–6) Clay (24–9)

Result	W–L	Date	Tournament	Tier	Surface	Partner	Opponents	Score
Loss	0–1	Jul 2010	ITF Zwevegem, Belgium	25,000	Clay	(Ukraine) Maryna Zanevska	(Netherlands) Richèl Hogenkamp (Russia) Valeria Savinykh	3–6, 6–3, [7–10]
Loss	0–2	Aug 2010	ITF Westende, Belgium	10,000	Hard	(Belgium) Alison Van Uytvanck	(Netherlands) Quirine Lemoine (Netherlands) Demi Schuurs	6–3, 4–6, [4–10]
Win	1–2	Mar 2011	ITF Ribeirão Preto, Brazil	10,000	Clay	(Brazil) Gabriela Cé	(Brazil) Monique Albuquerque (Brazil) Isabela Miró	6–2, 6–4
Win	2–2	Apr 2012	Chiasso Open, Switzerland	25,000	Clay	(Russia) Daria Gavrilova	(Switzerland) Conny Perrin (Slovenia) Maša Zec Peškirič	6–0, 7–6
Win	3–2	May 2012	Open Saint-Gaudens, France	50,000	Clay	(Serbia) Vesna Dolonc	(United Kingdom) Naomi Broady (Israel) Julia Glushko	6–2, 6–0
Loss	3–3	Jun 2012	Trofeul Popeci, Romania	50,000	Clay	(Poland) Paula Kania	(Czech Republic) Renata Voráčová (Slovakia) Lenka Wienerová	2–6, 6–3, [10–6]
Loss	3–4	Jun 2013	Internazionali di Brescia, Italy	25,000	Clay	(Hungary) Réka Luca Jani	(Australia) Monique Adamczak (Japan) Yurika Sema	4–6, 5–7
Win	4–4	Jun 2013	ITF Padua, Italy	25,000	Clay	(Poland) Paula Kania	(Romania) Cristina Dinu (Slovenia) Maša Zec Peškirič	6–3, 6–1
Win	5–4	Jun 2013	Open de Montpellier, France	25,000	Clay	(Czech Republic) Renata Voráčová	(Brazil) Paula Cristina Gonçalves (Spain) Inés Ferrer Suárez	6–1, 6–4
Win	6–4	Aug 2013	ITF Fleurus, Belgium	25,000	Clay	(Latvia) Diāna Marcinkēviča	(Brazil) Gabriela Cé (Chile) Daniela Seguel	6–4, 6–3
Win	7–4	Jan 2014	ITF Vero Beach, United States	25,000	Clay	(United States) Allie Will	(United States) Jacqueline Cako (United States) Sanaz Marand	7–5, 6–3
Win	8–4	Jan 2014	ITF Port St. Lucie, United States	25,000	Clay	(Hungary) Réka Luca Jani	(United States) Jan Abaza (United States) Louisa Chirico	6–4, 6–4
Win	9–4	Feb 2014	ITF Buenos Aires, Argentina	10,000	Clay	(Russia) Yuliya Kalabina	(Uruguay) Carolina de los Santos (Chile) Fernanda Brito	6–3, 6–2
Win	10–4	Feb 2014	ITF Buenos Aires, Argentina	10,000	Clay	(Russia) Yuliya Kalabina	(Argentina) Ana Victoria Gobbi Monllau (Argentina) Constanza Vega	6–1, 6–1
Loss	10–5	Mar 2014	ITF Irapuato, Mexico	25,000	Hard	(Germany) Anna Zaja	(United States) Denise Mureşan (Netherlands) Indy de Vroome	4–6, 7–5, [7–10]
Win	11–5	Jun 2014	ITF Budapest, Hungary	25,000	Clay	(Hungary) Réka Luca Jani	(Slovenia) Dalila Jakupović (Czech Republic) Kateřina Kramperová	7–5, 6–4
Win	12–5	Jun 2014	ITF Minsk, Belarus	25,000	Clay	(Belarus) Ilona Kremen	(Belarus) Lidziya Marozava (Belarus) Sviatlana Pirazhenka	7–5, 6–0
Loss	12–6	Oct 2014	ITF Bangkok, Thailand	25,000	Hard	(Russia) Daria Gavrilova	(China) Liu Chang (China) Lu Jiajing	4–6, 3–6
Win	13–6	Jan 2015	ITF Plantation, United States	25,000	Clay	(United States) Asia Muhammad	(United States) Jan Abaza (United States) Sanaz Marand	6–2, 6–2
Loss	13–7	May 2015	Charlottesville Open, United States	50,000	Clay	(Ukraine) Olga Ianchuk	(Canada) Françoise Abanda (United States) Maria Sanchez	1–6, 3–6
Win	14–8	Jun 2015	ITF Minsk, Belarus	25,000	Clay	(Russia) Valentina Ivakhnenko	(Turkey) Pemra Özgen (Ukraine) Anastasiya Vasylyeva	6–3, 6–0
Win	15–8	Jun 2015	ITF Moscow, Russia	25,000	Clay	(Russia) Polina Leykina	(Ukraine) Alona Fomina (Ukraine) Anastasiya Vasylyeva	7–5, 7–5
Win	16–8	Jul 2015	ITF Darmstadt, Germany	25,000	Clay	(Belarus) Lidziya Marozava	(Turkey) Pemra Özgen (Germany) Anne Schäfer	6–4, 6–4
Loss	16–8	Oct 2015	Zhuhai Open, China	50,000	Hard	(United Kingdom) Emily Webley-Smith	(China) Xu Shilin (China) You Xiaodi	6–3, 2–6, [4–10]
Win	17–8	Dec 2015	ITF Bangkok, Thailand	25,000	Hard	(Russia) Valeria Solovyeva	(Indonesia) Jessy Rompies (Thailand) Nungnadda Wannasuk	5–7, 6–4, [12–10]
Win	18–8	Dec 2015	ITF Bangkok, Thailand	25,000	Hard	(Russia) Valeria Solovyeva	(South Korea) Choi Ji-hee (Thailand) Peangtarn Plipuech	6–3, 4–6, [10–5]
Loss	18–9	Mar 2016	Abierto de Puebla, México	25,000	Hard	(Russia) Ksenia Lykina	(Japan) Akiko Omae (India) Prarthana Thombare	4–6, 6–2, [8–10]
Loss	18–10	May 2016	Nana Trophy, Tunisia	50,000	Clay	(Turkey) İpek Soylu	(Australia) Arina Rodionova (Ukraine) Valeriya Strakhova	1–6, 2–6
Win	19–10	Sep 2016	Open de Biarritz, France	100,000	Clay	(Ukraine) Maryna Zanevska	(Sweden) Cornelia Lister (Serbia) Nina Stojanović	4–6, 7–5, [10–8]
Win	20–10	Nov 2016	ITF Pune, India	25,000	Hard	(Bulgaria) Aleksandrina Naydenova	(India) Sowjanya Bavisetti (India) Rishika Sunkara	6–2, 6–1
Win	21–10	Sep 2017	ITF Balatonboglár, Hungary	25,000	Clay	(Latvia) Diāna Marcinkēviča	(Hungary) Ágnes Bukta (Slovakia) Vivien Juhászová	6–4, 6–3
Win	22–10	Jan 2018	Playford International, Australia	25,000	Hard	(Slovenia) Dalila Jakupović	(Japan) Junri Namigata (Japan) Erika Sema	2–6, 7–5, [10–5]
Win	23–10	Sep 2018	Open de Valencia, Spain	60,000	Clay	(Serbia) Nina Stojanović	(Greece) Valentini Grammatikopoulou (Mexico) Renata Zarazúa	6–1, 6–4
Loss	23–11	Jan 2019	Burnie International, Australia	60,000	Hard	(Belgium) Maryna Zanevska	(Australia) Ellen Perez (Australia) Arina Rodionova	4–6, 3–6
Win	24–11	Oct 2021	ITF Les Franqueses del Vallès, Spain	80,000+H	Hard	(Australia) Arina Rodionova	(Switzerland) Susan Bandecchi (United Kingdom) Eden Silva	2–6, 6–3, [10–6]
Win	25–11	Mar 2022	ITF Santo Domingo, Dominican Republic	25,000	Hard	(Serbia) Natalija Stevanović	Anastasia Tikhonova (Latvia) Darja Semenistaja	6–1, 7–6^{(5)}
Loss	25–12	Apr 2022	Zagreb Ladies Open, Croatia	60,000	Clay	(North Macedonia) Lina Gjorcheska	(Czech Republic) Anastasia Dețiuc (Ukraine) Katarina Zavatska	4–6, 7–6^{(5)}, [9–11]
Loss	25–13	Jul 2022	Open de Montpellier, France	60,000	Clay	(France) Estelle Cascino	(Ecuador) Andrea Gámiz (Spain) Andrea Lázaro García	4–6, 6–2, [11–13]
Win	26–13	Jul 2022	ITF Aschaffenburg, Germany	25,000	Clay	Maria Timofeeva	(Czech Republic) Karolína Kubáňová (Czech Republic) Ivana Šebestová	6–2, 5–7, [10–3]
Win	27–13	Aug 2022	Ladies Open Hechingen, Germany	60,000	Clay	Diana Shnaider	(Serbia) Tamara Čurović (United States) Chiara Scholl	6–2, 6–3
Win	28–13	Sep 2022	ITF Otočec, Slovenia	25,000	Clay	Iryna Shymanovich	(Egypt) Sandra Samir (Chinese Taipei) Yang Ya-yi	6–2, 6–4
Loss	28–14	Oct 2022	ITF Otočec, Slovenia	25,000	Clay	Iryna Shymanovich	(United States) Jessie Aney (Czech Republic) Anna Sisková	0–3 ret.
Win	29–14	Oct 2022	ITF Sozopol, Bulgaria	25,000	Hard	(Estonia) Elena Malõgina	(Romania) Ilona Georgiana Ghioroaie (Hungary) Rebeka Stolmár	7–6, 6–2
Win	30–14	Oct 2022	ITF Sozopol, Bulgaria	25,000	Hard	Darya Astakhova	(Netherlands) Jasmijn Gimbrère (Estonia) Elena Malõgina	w/o
Loss	30–15	Nov 2022	Open de Valencia, Spain	80,000+H	Clay	Iryna Shymanovich	(Switzerland) Ylena In-Albon (Spain) Cristina Bucșa	3–6, 2–6
Win	31–15	Jan 2023	Canberra International, Australia	60,000	Hard	Anastasia Tikhonova	(United States) Robin Anderson (United States) Hailey Baptiste	6–4, 7–5
Win	32–15	Mar 2023	ITF Anapoima, Colombia	40,000	Clay	(Ukraine) Valeriya Strakhova	(Venezuela) Andrea Gámiz (Netherlands) Eva Vedder	6–0, 1–6, [10–4]
Win	33–15	Apr 2023	ITF Istanbul, Turkey	60,000	Clay	Anastasia Tikhonova	(Ukraine) Valeriya Strakhova (Australia) Priscilla Hon	7–6^{(3)}, 6–4

== Junior Grand Slam finals ==
=== Singles: 1 (runner-up) ===
Result	Date	Tournament	Surface	Opponent	Score
Loss	2011	Wimbledon	Grass	(Australia) Ashleigh Barty	5–7, 6–7^{(3–7)}

=== Doubles: 5 (3 titles, 2 runner-ups) ===
Result	Date	Tournament	Surface	Partner	Opponents	Score
Loss	2010	Wimbledon	Grass	(Ukraine) Elina Svitolina	(Hungary) Tímea Babos (United States) Sloane Stephens	7–6^{(7)}, 2–6, 2–6
Win	2011	French Open	Clay	(Ukraine) Maryna Zanevska	(Russia) Victoria Kan (Netherlands) Demi Schuurs	6–4, 7–5
Win	2011	US Open	Hard	(Netherlands) Demi Schuurs	(United States) Gabrielle Andrews (United States) Taylor Townsend	6–4, 5–7, [10–5]
Loss	2012	Australian Open	Hard	(Montenegro) Danka Kovinić	(United States) Gabrielle Andrews (United States) Taylor Townsend	7–5, 5–7, [6–10]
Win	2012	French Open	Clay	(Russia) Daria Gavrilova	(Paraguay) Montserrat González (Brazil) Beatriz Haddad Maia	4–6, 6–4, [10–8]

== Notes ==
Awards
Preceded by (Russia) Daria Gavrilova	ITF Junior World Champion; 2011	Succeeded by (United States) Taylor Townsend
