= Kunming Open =

Tournament information
- Founded: 2012; 14 years ago
- Location: Anning, China
- Venue: Hot Springs Tennis Center
- Surface: clay – outdoors
ATP Tour
- Category: ITF Men's World Tennis Tour
- Draw: 32S / 64Q / 16D
- Prize money: $25,000 (2024)
WTA Tour
- Category: ITF Women's World Tennis Tour
- Draw: 32S / 32Q / 16D
- Prize money: $40,000 (2024)

The Kunming Open (formerly known as the ATP China International Tennis Challenge – Anning and the Anning Open) is a tennis tournament held in Anning, China. The event started in 2012 for the men, in 2014 for the women as an ITF Tour event, and in 2018 as a WTA 125 event, joining the ATP Challenger Tour. It was cancelled in 2020 due to the Coronavirus outbreak. The event was part of the ITF Men's World Tennis Tour and the Women's Tour in 2023 and 2024 and was played on clay courts.

== Past finals ==
=== Men's singles ===
Year	Champion	Runner-up	Score
↓ ATP Challenger event ↓
2012	(Slovenia) Grega Žemlja	(Slovenia) Aljaž Bedene	1–6, 7–5, 6–3
2013	(Hungary) Márton Fucsovics	(United Kingdom) James Ward	7–5, 3–6, 6–3
2014	(Australia) Alex Bolt	(Croatia) Nikola Mektić	6–2, 7–5
2015	(Croatia) Franko Škugor	(Australia) Gavin van Peperzeel	7–5, 6–2
2016	(Australia) Jordan Thompson	(France) Mathias Bourgue	6–3, 6–2
2017	(Serbia) Janko Tipsarević	(France) Quentin Halys	6–7^{(5–7)}, 6–3, 6–4
2018	(India) Prajnesh Gunneswaran	(Egypt) Mohamed Safwat	5–7, 6–3, 6–1
2019	(United Kingdom) Jay Clarke	(India) Prajnesh Gunneswaran	6–4, 6–3
↓ CTA event (Note: Between 2020 and 2022, the event temporarily repurposed as part of Chinese domestic events 'CTA Tour' due to the COVID-19 pandemic (still open to foreign players in China). The 2020 edition was originally to be a part of ATP Challenger Tour and WTA 125K series, and the 2021 edition was originally to be a part of WTA 250 tournaments.) ↓
2020	(China) Hua Runhao	(China) Mo Yecong	7–5, 7–6^{(7–4)}
2021	(China) Bu Yunchaokete	(China) Li Zhe	7–6^{(7–3)}, 6–3
2022	(China) Li Zekai	(China) Bai Yan	6–2, 7–6^{(8–6)}
↓ ITF Tour event ↓
2023	(China) Sun Fajing	(China) Cui Jie	6–3, 4–6, 6–2
2024	(China) Cui Jie	(China) Bai Yan	6–3, 4–6, 6–2

=== Women's singles ===
Year	Champion	Runner-up	Score
↓ ITF Circuit event ↓
2014	(China) Zheng Saisai	(Serbia) Jovana Jakšić	6–2, 6–3
2015	(China) Zheng Saisai (2)	(China) Han Xinyun	6–4, 3–6, 6–4
2016	(China) Zhang Kailin	(China) Peng Shuai	6–1, 0–6, 4–2 ret.
2017	(China) Zheng Saisai (3)	(Kazakhstan) Zarina Diyas	7–5, 6–4
↓ WTA 125 event ↓
2018	(Russia) Irina Khromacheva	(China) Zheng Saisai	3–6, 6–4, 7–6^{(7–5)}
2019	(China) Zheng Saisai (4)	(China) Zhang Shuai	6–4, 6–0
↓ CTA event ↓
2020	(China) Wang Meiling	(China) Cao Siqi	6–4, 6–2
2021	(China) Wang Meiling (2)	(China) Ma Yexin	6–3, 6–1
2022	(China) Zheng Wushuang	(China) Guo Meiqi	6–2, 6–1
↓ ITF Tour event ↓
2023	(China) Gao Xinyu	(China) Wei Sijia	6–3, 7–6^{(7–2)}
2024	(China) Shi Han	(China) Li Zongyu	6–4, 6–3
2025	Not held		
2026	Anastasia Zolotareva	Alexandra Shubladze	2–6, 6–2, 7–6^{(7–5)}

=== Men's doubles ===
Year	Champions	Runners-up	Score
↓ ATP Challenger event ↓
2012	(Thailand) Sanchai Ratiwatana (Thailand) Sonchat Ratiwatana	(South Africa) Ruan Roelofse (Thailand) Kittipong Wachiramanowong	4–6, 7–6^{(7–1)}, [13–11]
2013	(Russia) Victor Baluda (Croatia) Dino Marcan	(Australia) Samuel Groth (Australia) John-Patrick Smith	6–7^{(5–7)}, 6–4, [10–7]
2014	(Australia) Alex Bolt (Australia) Andrew Whittington	(United Kingdom) Daniel Cox (China) Gong Maoxin	6–4, 6–3
2015	(China) Bai Yan (China) Wu Di	(India) Karunuday Singh (Australia) Andrew Whittington	6–3, 6–4
2016	(China) Bai Yan (Italy) Riccardo Ghedin	(Ukraine) Denys Molchanov (Kazakhstan) Aleksandr Nedovyesov	4–6, 6–3, [10–6]
2017	(Croatia) Dino Marcan (Austria) Tristan-Samuel Weissborn	(Australia) Steven de Waard (Slovenia) Blaž Kavčič	5–7, 6–3, [10–7]
2018	(Belarus) Aliaksandr Bury (South Africa) Lloyd Harris	(China) Gong Maoxin (China) Zhang Ze	6–3, 6–4
2019	(Australia) Max Purcell (Australia) Luke Saville	(Netherlands) David Pel (Chile) Hans Podlipnik Castillo	4–6, 7–5, [10–5]
↓ CTA event ↓
2020	(China) Hua Runhao (China) Zhang Zhizhen	(China) Gong Maoxin (China) Zhang Ze	7–5, 7–5
2021	(China) Bu Yunchaokete (China) Li Zhe	(China) Bai Yan (China) Sun Fajing	7–6^{(7–5)}, 3–6, [11–9]
2022	(China) Jin Yuquan (China) Li Zekai	(China) Bai Yan (China) Zhao Zhao	6–0, 5–7, [10–8]
↓ ITF Tour event ↓
2023	(China) Cui Jie (China) Wang Xiaofei	(China) Sun Fajing (United States) Evan Zhu	3–6, 6–2, [10–8]
2024	(Chinese Taipei) Jeffrey Chuan En-hsu (South Korea) Shin Woo-bin	(China) Cui Jie (China) Sun Fajing	2–6, 6–3, [10–5]

=== Women's doubles ===
Year	Champions	Runners-up	Score
↓ ITF Circuit event ↓
2014	(China) Han Xinyun (China) Zhang Kailin	(Thailand) Varatchaya Wongteanchai (Hong Kong) Zhang Ling	6–4, 6–2
2015	(China) Xu Yifan (China) Zheng Saisai	(China) Yang Zhaoxuan (China) Ye Qiuyu	7–5, 6–2
2016	(China) Wang Yafan (China) Zhang Kailin (2)	(Thailand) Varatchaya Wongteanchai (China) Yang Zhaoxuan	6–7^{(3–7)}, 7–6^{(7–2)}, [10–1]
2017	(China) Han Xinyun (2) (China) Ye Qiuyu	(India) Prarthana Thombare (China) Xun Fangying	6–2, 7–5
↓ WTA 125 event ↓
2018	(Slovenia) Dalila Jakupovic (Russia) Irina Khromacheva	(China) Guo Hanyu (China) Sun Xuliu	6–1, 6–1
2019	(China) Peng Shuai (China) Yang Zhaoxuan	(China) Duan Yingying (China) Han Xinyun	7–5, 6–2
↓ CTA event ↓
2020	(China) Han Xinyun (3) (China) Zhu Aiwen	(China) Jiang Xinyu (China) Tang Qianhui	6–2, 4–6, [10–6]
2021	(China) Jiang Xinyu (China) Tang Qianhui	(China) Feng Shuo (China) Zheng Wushuang	2–6, 6–3, [10–3]
2022	(China) Jiang Xinyu (2) (China) Tang Qianhui (2)	(China) Wang Shuoran (China) Zhang Jin	6–3, 6–4
↓ ITF Tour event ↓
2023	(China) Guo Hanyu (China) Jiang Xinyu (3)	(Kazakhstan) Zhibek Kulambayeva (Thailand) Lanlana Tararudee	6–2, 6–0
2024	(United States) Haley Giavara (Chinese Taipei) Li Yu-yun	(China) Feng Shuo (South Korea) Park So-hyun	6–3, 6–1
2025	Not held		
2026	Sofya Lansere; Alexandra Shubladze	(South Korea) Shin Ji-ho (Uzbekistan) Sevil Yuldasheva	7–6^{(7–4)}, 6–1
