= Guo Shanshan =

Chinese tennis player

Guo Shanshan 郭姗杉
- Country (sports): China
- Born: 9 August 1996 (age 28); Wuhan, China
- Prize money: $35,941

Singles
- Career record: 101–90
- Career titles: 1 ITF
- Highest ranking: No. 479 (6 March 2017)
- Current ranking: No. 747 (12 April 2021)

Doubles
- Career record: 29–43
- Career titles: 2 ITF
- Highest ranking: No. 476 (3 July 2017)
- Current ranking: No. 1181 (12 April 2021)
- Last updated on: 12 April 2021.

Guo Shanshan (Chinese: 郭姗杉; pinyin: Guō Shānshān; Mandarin pronunciation: [kwó ʂán ʂán]; born 9 August 1996) is an inactive Chinese tennis player.

She has a career-high singles ranking of world No. 479, achieved on 6 March 2017. She also has a career-high WTA doubles ranking of 476, set on 3 July 2017.

Guo made her WTA Tour main-draw debut at the 2017 Wuhan Open in the doubles draw partnering Ye Qiuyu.

== ITF Circuit finals ==
=== Singles: 1 (1–0) ===
Legend $100,000 tournaments $80,000 tournaments $60,000 tournaments $25,000 tournaments $15,000 tournaments	Finals by surface Hard (0–0) Clay (1–0) Grass (0–0) Carpet (0–0)

Result	No.	Date	Tournament	Surface	Opponent	Score
Win	1.	2 July 2017	ITF Anning, China	Clay	(Hong Kong) Eudice Chong	6–4, 6–4

=== Doubles: 3 (2–1) ===
Legend $100,000 tournaments $80,000 tournaments $60,000 tournaments $25,000 tournaments $15,000 tournaments	Finals by surface Hard (2–0) Clay (0–1) Grass (0–0) Carpet (0–0)

Outcome	No.	Date	Tournament	Surface	Partner	Opponents	Score
Runner-up	1.	8 July 2016	ITF Yuxi, China	Hard	(China) Gai Ao	(China) Jiang Xinyu (China) Tang Qianhui	2–6, 6–3, [5–10]
Winner	1.	17 February 2017	ITF Nanjing, China	Hard	(China) Jiang Xinyu	(Thailand) Nudnida Luangnam (China) Ye Qiuyu	7–5, 7–5
Winner	2.	24 June 2017	ITF Anning, China	Clay	(China) Sun Xuliu	(China) Du Zhima (China) Nima Zhuoma	6–3, 6–3
