= Zhang Kailin =

Chinese tennis player

Zhang Kailin 张恺琳
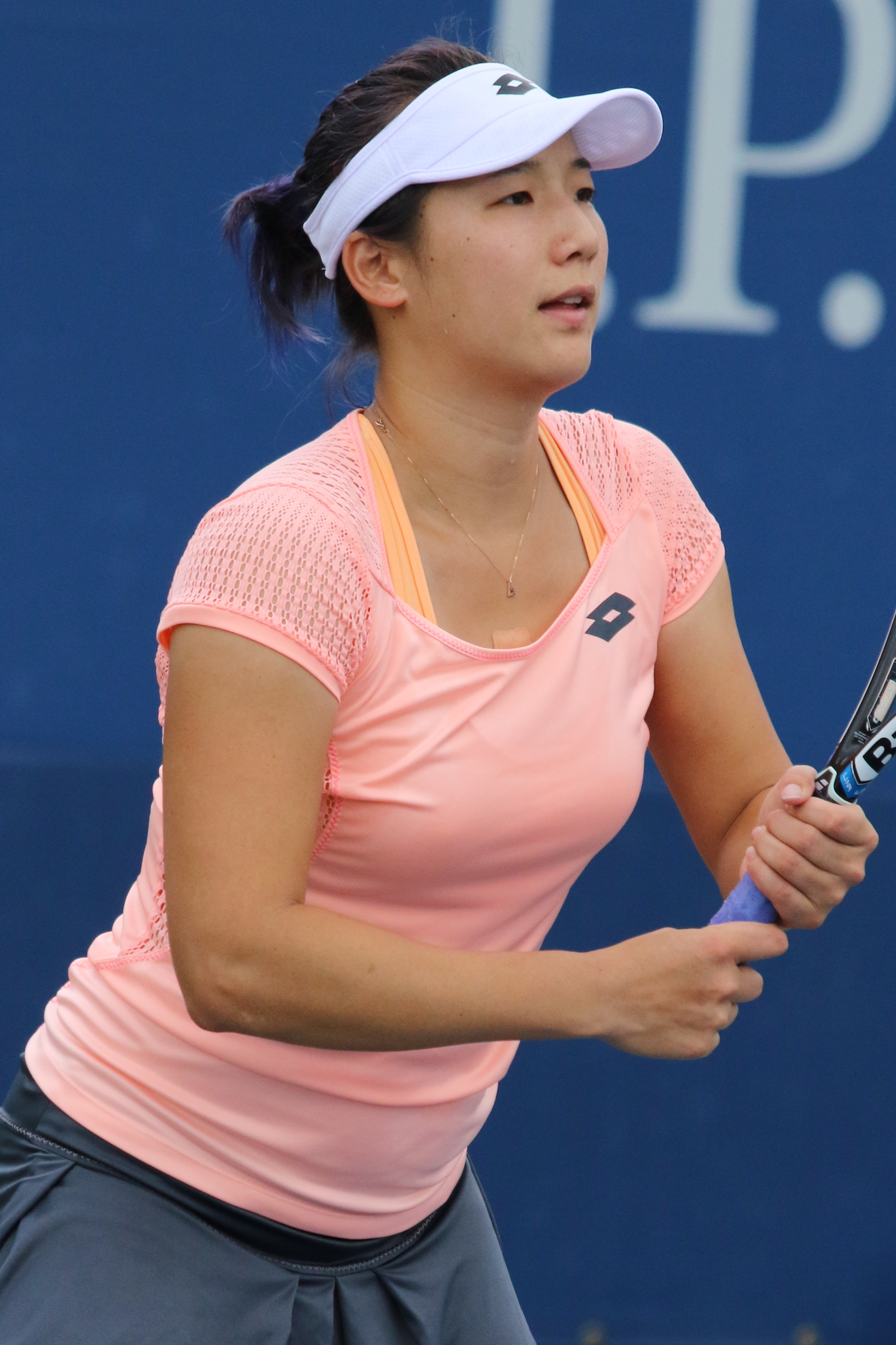
- Zhang at the 2016 US Open
- Country (sports): China
- Residence: Wuhan, China
- Born: 28 January 1990 (age 36) Wuhan
- Height: 1.73 m (5 ft 8 in)
- Plays: Right (two-handed backhand)
- Coach: Guillaume Peyre
- Prize money: US$ 430,907

Singles
- Career record: 264–185
- Career titles: 5 ITF
- Highest ranking: No. 103 (12 September 2016)

Grand Slam singles results
- Australian Open: Q3 (2016)
- French Open: Q2 (2015)
- Wimbledon: Q3 (2016)
- US Open: Q2 (2016)

Doubles
- Career record: 151–97
- Career titles: 1 WTA 125, 15 ITF
- Highest ranking: No. 85 (20 June 2016)

Grand Slam doubles results
- Australian Open: 1R (2016)
- Wimbledon: 1R (2015)
- US Open: 1R (2016)

Team competitions
- Fed Cup: 4–1

Zhang Kailin (Chinese: 张恺琳; pinyin: Zhāng Kǎilín; Mandarin pronunciation: [ʈʂáŋ kʰàɪ lǐn]; born 28 January 1990) is a former tennis player from China.

Zhang won one doubles title on WTA 125 tournaments along with five singles titles and fifteen doubles titles on the ITF Circuit. On 12 September 2016, she reached her best singles ranking of world No. 103. On 20 June 2016, she peaked at No. 85 in the doubles rankings.

Partnering Han Xinyun, Zhang won her first $50k tournament in April 2014 at the ITF event in Anning, defeating Varatchaya Wongteanchai and Zhang Ling in the final. Three months later, again on the side of Han, Zhang won her second $50k title in Wuhan.

== WTA 125 finals ==
=== Doubles: 2 (1 title, 1 runner-up) ===
Result	W–L	Date	Tournament	Surface	Partner	Opponents	Score
Loss	0–1	Oct 2014	Ningbo International, China	Hard	(China) Han Xinyun	(Australia) Arina Rodionova (Ukraine) Olga Savchuk	6–4, 6–7^{(2)}, [6–10]
Win	1–1	Sep 2015	Dalian Open, China	Hard	(China) Zheng Saisai	(Chinese Taipei) Chan Chin-wei (Croatia) Darija Jurak	6–3, 6–4

== ITF Circuit finals ==
=== Singles: 14 (5 titles, 9 runner-ups) ===
Legend $100,000 tournaments $50/60,000 tournaments $25,000 tournaments $15,000 tournaments $10,000 tournaments	Finals by surface Hard (4–8) Clay (1–1)

Result	W–L	Date	Tournament	Tier	Surface	Opponent	Score
Loss	0–1	Jun 2011	ITF Jakarta, Indonesia	10,000	Hard	(Indonesia) Ayu Fani Damayanti	4–6, 3–6
Loss	0–2	Jul 2012	ITF Huzhu, China	15,000	Clay	(China) Liu Chang	3–6, 4–6
Win	1–2	Mar 2014	ITF Shenzhen, China	10,000	Hard	(China) Tian Ran	6–0, 5–7, 6–1
Loss	1–3	Mar 2014	ITF Shenzhen, China	10,000	Hard	(China) Tang Haochen	3–6, 2–6
Win	2–3	May 2014	ITF Zhengzhou, China	25,000	Hard	(China) Xu Yifan	7–5, 6–4
Loss	2–4	Jan 2015	ITF Hong Kong	50,000	Hard	(Japan) Misaki Doi	3–6, 3–6
Loss	2–5	Jul 2015	ITF Bangkok, Thailand	25,000	Hard	(China) Wang Qiang	2–6, 4–6
Win	3–5	Oct 2015	Suzhou Ladies Open, China	50,000	Hard	(China) Duan Yingying	1–6, 6–3, 6–4
Win	4–5	Apr 2016	ITF Nanning, China	25,000	Hard	(China) Liu Fangzhou	6–3, 6–4
Win	5–5	May 2016	Kunming Open, China	100,000	Clay	(China) Peng Shuai	6–1, 0–6, 4–2 ret.
Loss	5–6	Jan 2018	ITF Sharm El Sheikh, Egypt	15,000	Hard	(Poland) Katarzyna Kawa	2–6, 6–4, 2–6
Loss	5–7	Jul 2018	ITF Nonthaburi, Thailand	25,000	Hard	(Chinese Taipei) Lee Ya-hsuan	1–6, 3–6
Loss	5–8	Aug 2018	ITF Tsukuba, Japan	25,000	Hard	(China) Wang Xiyu	6–3, 5–7, 5–7
Loss	5–9	Feb 2019	Japan Indoor Championships	60,000	Hard (i)	(Switzerland) Ylena In-Albon	2–6, 3–6

=== Doubles: 21 (15 titles, 6 runner-ups) ===
Legend $100,000 tournaments $50,000 tournaments $25,000 tournaments $15,000 tournaments $10,000 tournaments	Finals by surface Hard (9–6) Clay (4–0) Grass (2–0)

Result	W–L	Date	Tournament	Tier	Surface	Partner	Opponents	Score
Loss	0–1	Jun 2010	ITF Hefei, China	10,000	Hard	(China) Bai Xi	(China) Tian Ran (China) Zheng Saisai	0–6, 4–6
Win	1–1	May 2011	ITF Jakarta, Indonesia	10,000	Hard	(China) Zheng Junyi	(Indonesia) Bella Destriana (Indonesia) Nadya Syarifah	6–2, 6–4
Loss	1–2	Oct 2011	ITF Kalgoorlie, Australia	25,000	Hard	(China) Xu Yifan	(Australia) Casey Dellacqua (Australia) Olivia Rogowska	1–6, 1–6
Win	2–2	Feb 2012	ITF Antalya, Turkey	10,000	Clay	(China) Yang Zhaoxuan	(China) Li Yihong (China) Tang Haochen	7–6^{(6)}, 5–7, [10–8]
Loss	2–3	May 2012	ITF Changwon, South Korea	25,000	Hard	(China) Yang Zhaoxuan	(China) Liu Wanting (China) Xu Yifan	4–6, 5–7
Win	3–3	Jul 2012	ITF Huzhu, China	15,000	Clay	(China) Li Yihong	(China) Tian Ran (China) Wang Yafan	3–6, 6–4, [10–6]
Win	4–3	Feb 2014	ITF Nonthaburi, Thailand	10,000	Hard	(China) Han Xinyun	(United Kingdom) Katie Boulter (China) Xun Fangying	6–3, 6–0
Win	5–3	Mar 2014	ITF Shenzhen, China	10,000	Hard	(China) Han Xinyun	(Chinese Taipei) Chan Chin-wei (China) Liu Chang	6–3, 2–6, [13–11]
Win	6–3	Mar 2014	ITF Shenzhen, China	10,000	Hard	(China) Han Xinyun	(China) Gai Ao (China) Wang Yan	6–0, 6–3
Win	7–3	Apr 2014	ITF Nanning, China	25,000	Hard	(China) Han Xinyun	(Hong Kong) Zhang Ling (China) Zheng Saisai	7–6^{(8)}, 7–6^{(3)}
Win	8–3	Apr 2014	Anning Open, China	50,000	Clay	(China) Han Xinyun	(Thailand) Varatchaya Wongteanchai (Hong Kong) Zhang Ling	6–4, 6–2
Loss	8–4	May 2014	ITF Zhengzhou, China	25,000	Hard	(China) Han Xinyun	(Chinese Taipei) Chan Chin-wei (China) Liang Chen	3–6, 3–6
Win	9–4	Jul 2014	ITF Wuhan, China	50,000	Hard	(China) Han Xinyun	(Japan) Miyu Kato (Japan) Makoto Ninomiya	6–4, 6–2
Win	10–4	Aug 2014	ITF Tsukuba, Japan	25,000	Hard	(China) Han Xinyun	(Thailand) Nicha Lertpitaksinchai (Thailand) Peangtarn Plipuech	6–4, 6–4
Win	11–4	Jul 2015	ITF Bangkok, Thailand	25,000	Hard	(China) Han Xinyun	(Japan) Kanae Hisami (Japan) Kotomi Takahata	6–3, 6–4
Loss	11–5	Oct 2015	Suzhou Ladies Open, China	50,000	Hard	(China) Tian Ran	(China) Yang Zhaoxuan (China) Zhang Yuxuan	6–7^{(4)}, 2–6
Loss	11–6	Oct 2015	Nanjing Ladies Open, China	100,000	Hard	(Chinese Taipei) Chan Chin-wei	(Japan) Shuko Aoyama (Japan) Eri Hozumi	5–7, 7–6^{(7)}, [7–10]
Win	12–6	Apr 2016	ITF Kashiwa, Japan	25,000	Hard	(China) Yang Zhaoxuan	(China) You Xiaodi (China) Zhu Lin	7–5, 2–6, [11–9]
Win	13–6	May 2016	Kunming Open, China	100,000	Clay	(China) Wang Yafan	(Thailand) Varatchaya Wongteanchai (China) Yang Zhaoxuan	6–7^{(3)}, 7–6^{(2)}, [10–1]
Win	14–6	May 2016	Eastbourne Trophy, UK	50,000	Grass	(China) Yang Zhaoxuan	(United States) Asia Muhammad (United States) Maria Sanchez	7–6^{(5)}, 6–1
Win	15–6	Jun 2016	Ilkley Trophy, UK	50,000	Grass	(China) Yang Zhaoxuan	(Belgium) An-Sophie Mestach (Australia) Storm Sanders	6–3, 7–6^{(5)}
