= Kang Jiaqi =

Chinese tennis player

Kang Jiaqi 康佳琪
- Country (sports): China
- Residence: Tianjin, China
- Born: 19 July 1997 (age 29) Tianjin
- Plays: Right (two-handed backhand)
- Prize money: $74,929

Singles
- Career record: 157–135
- Career titles: 1 ITF
- Highest ranking: No. 341 (2 October 2017)

Doubles
- Career record: 88–100
- Career titles: 2 ITF
- Highest ranking: No. 197 (14 January 2019)

Kang Jiaqi (Chinese: 康佳琪; pinyin: Kāng Jiāqí; Mandarin pronunciation: [kʰáŋ tɕjá tɕʰǐ]; born 19 July 1997) is a female former tennis player from China.

In her career, she won one singles title and two doubles titles in tournaments of the ITF Women's Circuit. On 26 November 2018, she achieved her best doubles rankings of world No. 198.

Kang made her WTA Tour main-draw debut at the 2015 Tianjin Open, after she was handed a wildcard into the doubles event, partnering with Zhang Shuai.

== ITF Circuit finals ==
=== Singles: 2 (1 title, 1 runner-up) ===
Legend $10,000 tournaments	Finals by surface Clay (1–1)

Result	Date	Tournament	Surface	Opponent	Score
Win	12 June 2016	ITF Anning, China	Clay	(China) Sun Xuliu	6–3, 6–2
Loss	19 June 2016	ITF Anning, China	Clay	(China) Xun Fangying	3–6, 1–6

=== Doubles: 10 (2 titles, 8 runner-ups) ===
Legend $60,000 tournaments $25,000 tournaments $15,000 tournaments $10,000 tournaments	Finals by surface Hard (2–5) Clay (0–3)

Result	W–L	Date	Tournament	Surface	Partner	Opponents	Score
Loss	0–1	12 June 2016	ITF Anning, China	Clay	(China) Sun Xuliu	(China) Li Yihong (China) Xin Yuan	7–5, 4–6, [8–10]
Loss	0–2	18 June 2016	ITF Anning, China	Clay	(China) Sun Xuliu	(China) Chen Jiahui (China) Xin Yuan	4–6, 6–7^{(3)}
Loss	0–3	12 May 2017	ITF Yuxi, China	Hard	(China) Gai Ao	(China) Jiang Xinyu (China) Tang Qianhui	2–6, 5–7
Loss	0–4	30 June 2017	ITF Anning, China	Clay	(China) Feng Shuo	(China) Sun Xuliu (China) Zang Jiaxue	2–6, 4–6
Win	1–4	6 July 2018	ITF Tongliao, China	Hard	(South Korea) Kim Na-ri	(China) Jiang Xinyu (China) Tang Qianhui	6–7^{(4)}, 6–4, [10–5]
Win	2–4	17 August 2018	ITF Guiyang, China	Hard	(China) Xun Fangying	(China) Chen Jiahui (China) Yuan Yue	3–6, 7–5, [10–6]
Loss	2–5	3 November 2018	Liuzhou Open, China	Hard	(South Korea) Lee So-ra	(Hong Kong) Eudice Chong (China) Ye Qiuyu	5–7, 3–6
Loss	2–6	20 July 2019	ITF Qujing, China	Hard (i)	(Thailand) Peangtarn Plipuech	(Japan) Mana Ayukawa (Japan) Erika Sema	2–6, 3–6
Loss	2–7	12 October 2019	ITF Hua Hin, Thailand	Hard	(Thailand) Tamarine Tanasugarn	(Thailand) Patcharin Cheapchandej (Thailand) Punnin Kovapitukted	3–6, 4–6
Loss	2–8	8 February 2020	ITF Nonthaburi, Thailand	Hard	(Japan) Miyabi Inoue	(India) Ankita Raina (Netherlands) Bibiane Schoofs	2–6, 6–3, [7–10]
