= Sun Xuliu =

Chinese tennis player

Sun Xuliu 孙旭柳
- Country (sports): China
- Born: 7 March 1994 (age 32)
- Prize money: $79,900

Singles
- Career record: 158–136
- Career titles: 1 ITF
- Highest ranking: No. 384 (14 May 2018)

Doubles
- Career record: 110–106
- Career titles: 5 ITF
- Highest ranking: No. 268 (1 May 2017)

Sun Xuliu (Chinese: 孙旭柳; pinyin: Sūn Xùliǔ; Mandarin pronunciation: [swə́n ɕŷ ljòʊ]; born 7 March 1994) is a former professional Chinese tennis player.

On 14 May 2018, she achieved her career-high singles ranking of world No. 384. On 1 May 2017, she peaked at No. 268 in the WTA doubles rankings.

Sun made her WTA Tour main-draw debut in the doubles tournament of the 2017 Jiangxi International Open, partnering with Zheng Wushuang.

== WTA 125 finals ==
=== Doubles: 1 (runner-up) ===
| Result | Date | Tournament | Surface | Partner | Opponents | Score |
|---|---|---|---|---|---|---|
| Loss | 5 May 2018 | Kunming Open, China | Hard | (China) Guo Hanyu | (Slovenia) Dalila Jakupović (Russia) Irina Khromacheva | 1–6, 1–6 |

== ITF Circuit finals ==
=== Singles: 5 (1 title, 4 runner-ups) ===
| Legend $15,000 tournaments $10,000 tournaments | Finals by surface Hard (0–1) Clay (1–3) |

| Result | No. | Date | Tournament | Surface | Opponent | Score |
|---|---|---|---|---|---|---|
| Loss | 1. | 20 December 2014 | ITF Hong Kong, China | Hard | (China) Liang Chen | 3–6, 5–7 |
| Loss | 2. | 12 June 2016 | ITF Anning, China | Clay | (China) Kang Jiaqi | 3–6, 2–6 |
| Win | 1. | 25 June 2017 | ITF Anning, China | Clay | (China) You Mizhuoma | 6–2, 7–6^{(5)} |
| Loss | 3. | 29 September 2018 | ITF Anning, China | Clay | (Chinese Taipei) Lee Hua-chen | 0–6, 1–6 |
| Loss | 4. | 29 September 2019 | ITF Anning, China | Clay | (China) Zheng Wushuang | 6–7^{(3)}, 3–6 |

=== Doubles: 16 (5 titles, 11 runner-ups) ===
| Legend $25,000 tournaments $15,000 tournaments $10,000 tournaments | Finals by surface Hard (2–7) Clay (3–4) |

| Result | No. | Date | Tournament | Surface | Partner | Opponents | Score |
|---|---|---|---|---|---|---|---|
| Loss | 1. | 12 June 2016 | ITF Anning, China | Clay | (China) Kang Jiaqi | (China) Li Yihong (China) Xin Yuan | 7–5, 4–6, [8–10] |
| Loss | 2. | 18 June 2016 | ITF Anning, China | Clay | (China) Kang Jiaqi | (China) Chen Jiahui (China) Xin Yuan | 4–6, 6–7^{(3)} |
| Loss | 3. | 8 August 2016 | ITF Naiman, China | Hard (i) | (China) Xun Fangying | (China) Tang Haochen (China) Zhang Yukun | 6–7^{(0)}, 6–4, [4–10] |
| Loss | 4. | 28 January 2017 | ITF Hammamet, Tunisia | Clay | (France) Victoria Muntean | (Greece) Despina Papamichail (Brazil) Laura Pigossi | 3–6, 6–4, [5–10] |
| Win | 1. | 27 February 2017 | ITF Nanjing, China | Hard | (China) Sun Ziyue | (Russia) Angelina Gabueva (Russia) Olga Puchkova | 6–3, 6–1 |
| Win | 2. | 24 June 2017 | ITF Anning, China | Clay | (China) Guo Shanshan | (China) Du Zhima (China) Ni Ma Zhuoma | 6–3, 6–3 |
| Win | 3. | 30 June 2017 | ITF Anning, China | Clay | (China) Zang Jiaxue | (China) Feng Shuo (China) Kang Jiaqi | 6–2, 6–4 |
| Loss | 5. | 2 March 2018 | ITF Xiamen, China | Hard | (China) Sun Ziyue | (Germany) Sarah-Rebecca Sekulic (China) Xu Shilin | 1–6, 5–7 |
| Loss | 6. | 23 March 2018 | ITF Nanjing, China | Hard | (China) Zhao Qianqian | (China) Han Xinyun (China) Ye Qiuyu | 6–3, 3–6, [5–10] |
| Loss | 7. | 31 March 2018 | ITF Nanjing, China | Hard | (China) Zhao Qianqian | (China) Feng Shuo (China) Zheng Wushuang | 2–6, 4–6 |
| Loss | 8. | 6 April 2018 | ITF Nanjing, China | Hard | (China) Zhao Qianqian | (China) Chen Jiahui (China) Zheng Wushuang | 6–7^{(2)}, 1–6 |
| Win | 4. | 28 September 2018 | ITF Anning, China | Clay | (China) Zhao Qianqian | (Chinese Taipei) Cho I-hsuan (Chinese Taipei) Cho Yi-tsen | 6–4, 3–6, [10–6] |
| Win | 5. | 23 March 2019 | ITF Xiamen, China | Hard | (China) Zhao Qianqian | (China) Tang Qianhui (China) Zhang Ying | 6–4, 6–4 |
| Loss | 9. | 15 June 2019 | ITF Hengyang, China | Hard | (China) Zhao Qianqian | (China) You Xiaodi (China) Zhang Ying | 1–6, 0–6 |
| Loss | 10. | 13 July 2019 | ITF Ulanqab, China | Hard | (China) Wang Meiling | (Japan) Kyoka Okamura (Thailand) Peangtarn Plipuech | 6–4, 5–7, [11–13] |
| Loss | 11. | 28 September 2019 | ITF Anning, China | Clay | (China) Sheng Yuqi | (China) Chen Jiahui (China) Zheng Wushuang | 6–7^{(4)}, 5–7 |
