= Bai Yan (tennis) =

Chinese tennis player

Bai Yan 柏衍
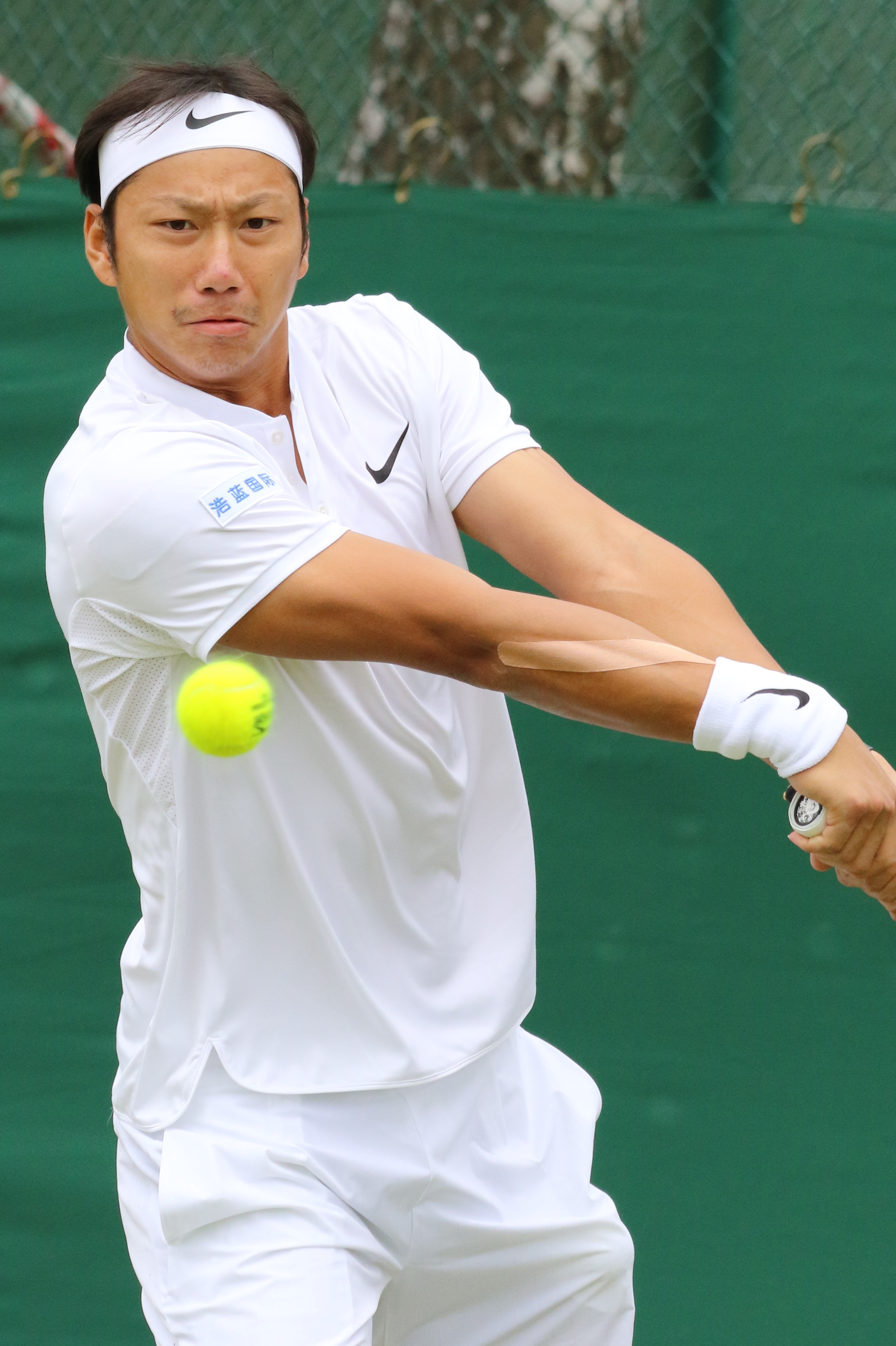
- Country (sports): China
- Residence: Shanghai, China
- Born: May 21, 1989 (age 37) Nanjing, China
- Height: 1.85 m (6 ft 1 in)
- Plays: Right-handed (two-handed backhand)
- Prize money: US $479,521

Singles
- Career record: 5–8 (ATP Tour and Grand Slam main draws, and in Davis Cup)
- Career titles: 0
- Highest ranking: No. 200 (21 March 2016)

Grand Slam singles results
- Australian Open: Q3 (2016)
- French Open: Q1 (2016)
- Wimbledon: Q1 (2016, 2025)
- US Open: Q1 (2016)

Doubles
- Career record: 1–5 (ATP Tour and Grand Slam main draws, and in Davis Cup)
- Career titles: 0
- Highest ranking: No. 109 (9 May 2016)

Grand Slam doubles results
- Wimbledon: Q1 (2016)

Team competitions
- Davis Cup: 4–3

Bai Yan (Chinese: 柏衍; pinyin: Bǎi Yǎn; Mandarin pronunciation: [pǎɪ jɛ̀n]; (Note: There is a third tone sandhi here so the actual pronunciation in pinyin is Bái Yǎn.) born May 21, 1989, in Nanjing, Jiangsu) is a Chinese inactive tennis player. He has a career-high ATP singles ranking of world No. 200, achieved in 2016. He has been inactive during 2026.

Yan has reached 34 career singles finals all on the ITF Futures tour, with a record of 27 wins and 7 losses. Additionally, he has reached 20 career doubles finals with a record of 13 wins and 7 losses, which includes four ATP Challenger Tour titles.

Yan has represented his native country of China competing during the Davis Cup. He holds a singles record of 3–2 and a doubles record of 1–1 for a combined Davis Cup record of 4–3.

== Career ==
=== 2007: Juniors and first Pro ITF title ===
As a junior, Bai reached his highest ranking as world No. 10 in the ITF junior singles rankings in January 2007.

=== 2008-2016: Masters debut and first win ===
Yan won back-to-back ITF Men's Circuit titles in September before knocking off World No. 30 Radek Štěpánek at the 2010 Shanghai Masters the following month.

After not competing on tour in 2011, Bai opened 2012 by reaching the singles semifinals of China F2 ITF Men's Circuit tournament.

=== 2017-2025: United Cup debut ===
Bai opened the 2017 season by winning the Hong Kong F6 futures.

He was selected as part of the 2025 United Cup Team China as the No. 2 ATP player.

== ATP Challenger and ITF Tour finals ==
=== Singles: 39 (29–10) ===
Legend ITF Futures/World Tennis Tour (29–10)	Finals by surface Hard (27–8) Clay (2–2)

Result	W–L	Date	Tournament	Tier	Surface	Opponent	Score
Win	1–0	Nov 2007	China F9, Su Zhou	Futures	Hard	(Netherlands) Antal Van Der Duim	6–1, 3–0 ret.
Loss	1–1	Feb 2008	Thailand F1, Nonthaburi	Futures	Hard	(Japan) Tatsuma Ito	6–3, 6–7^{(9–11)}, 4–6
Win	2–1	Mar 2008	Thailand F3, Nonthaburi	Futures	Hard	(Germany) Sebastian Rieschick	6–7^{(3–7)}, 6–3, 4–0 ret.
Win	3–1	Sep 2010	China F7, Hangzhou	Futures	Hard	(Finland) Harri Heliövaara	6–2, 4–6, 6–3
Win	4–1	Oct 2010	China F8, Shanghai	Futures	Hard	(China) Gong Maoxin	6–3, 6–2
Win	5–1	May 2012	China F7, Zhangjiagang	Futures	Hard	(China) Chang Yu	7–5, 7–6^{(10–8)}
Win	6–1	May 2013	China F4, Fuzhou	Futures	Hard	(United States) Jason Jung	6–3, 4–2 ret.
Loss	6–2	Mar 2014	China F1, Guangzhou	Futures	Hard	(China) Li Zhe	7–6^{(7–4)}, 6–7^{(3–7)}, 1–6
Win	7–2	Jun 2014	China F6, Putian	Futures	Hard	(China) Li Zhe	6–2, 6–1
Win	8–2	Jul 2014	China F8, Shenzhen	Futures	Hard	(China) Li Zhe	4–6, 6–2, 6–1
Loss	8–3	May 2015	China F6, Wuhan	Futures	Hard	(China) Li Zhe	4–6, 3–6
Win	9–3	Aug 2015	China F12, Fuzhou	Futures	Hard	(Japan) Arata Onozawa	6–2, 6–3
Loss	9–4	Aug 2015	Chinese Taipei F1, Kaohsiung	Futures	Hard	(Chinese Taipei) Yang Tsung-hua	6–4, 4–6, 0–1 ret.
Win	10–4	Aug 2015	Chinese Taipei F2, Kaohsiung	Futures	Hard	(Chinese Taipei) Yang Tsung-hua	6–3, 6–4
Win	11–4	Jan 2017	Hong Kong F6	Futures	Hard	(Japan) Takuto Niki	6–1, 6–4
Win	12–4	Jul 2018	China F9, Shenzhen	Futures	Hard	(South Korea) Son Ji-hoon	6–7^{(6–8)}, 6–4, 6–4
Win	13–4	Jul 2018	China F11, Kunshan	Futures	Hard	(China) Cui Jie	6–3, 6–3
Win	14–4	Aug 2018	China F13, Anning	Futures	Clay	(China) Wang Huixin	6–1, 6–0
Win	15–4	May 2019	M25 Wuhan, China	World Tennis Tour	Hard	(Japan) Shuichi Sekiguchi	6–2, 6–4
Win	16–4	Jun 2019	M25 Luzhou, China	World Tennis Tour	Hard	(China) He Yecong	6–3, 6–2
Win	17–4	Jun 2019	M25 Shenzhen, China	World Tennis Tour	Hard	(France) Laurent Rochette	6–4, 6–1
Loss	17–5	Jun 2019	M25 Yinchuan, China	World Tennis Tour	Hard	(Japan) Yuta Shimizu	6–4, 3–3 ret.
Win	18–5	Jul 2019	M25 Qujing, China	World Tennis Tour	Hard	(China) Sun Fajing	6–3, 6–1
Win	19–5	Jul 2019	M25 Taipei, Taiwan	World Tennis Tour	Hard	(Chinese Taipei) Hsu Yu Hsiou	6–4, 6–4
Loss	19–6	Apr 2022	M15 Chiang Rai, Thailand	World Tennis Tour	Hard	(South Korea) Nam Ji-sung	2–6, 4–6
Win	20–6	Jun 2023	M15 Tianjin, China	World Tennis Tour	Hard	(China) Mo Yecong	7–5, 6–3
Win	21–6	Jul 2023	M15 Tianjin, China	World Tennis Tour	Hard	(China) Wang Aoran	6–2, ret.
Win	22–6	Sep 2023	M25 Guiyang, China	World Tennis Tour	Hard	(Germany) Jimmy Yang	6–2, 6–2
Win	23–6	Mar 2024	M15 Hinode, Japan	World Tennis Tour	Hard	(Greece) Stefanos Sakellaridis	6–2, 6–4
Loss	23–7	May 2024	M25 Anning, China	World Tennis Tour	Clay	(China) Cui Jie	3–6, 4–6
Win	24–7	Jun 2024	M25 Luzhou, China	World Tennis Tour	Hard	(China) Zhou Yi	7–6^{(7–4)}, 7–6^{(8–6)}
Win	25–7	Jul 2024	M25 Tianjin, China	World Tennis Tour	Hard	(Chinese Taipei) Hsu Yu Hsiou	6–2, 6–4
Win	26–7	Aug 2024	M25 Yinchuan, China	World Tennis Tour	Hard	(China) Sun Fajing	6–4, 7–6^{(7–1)}
Win	27–7	Oct 2024	M25 Huzhou, China	World Tennis Tour	Hard	(China) Sun Fajing	6–3, 4–6, 6–2
Win	28–7	Mar 2025	M15 Ma'anshan, China	World Tennis Tour	Hard	Egor Agafonov	6–3, 6–4
Loss	28–8	Mar 2025	M25 Shenzhen, China	World Tennis Tour	Hard	(United Kingdom) Oliver Crawford	6–7^{(5–7)}, 6–1, 2–6
Win	29–8	Apr 2025	M25 Anning, China	World Tennis Tour	Clay	(South Korea) Sanhui Shin	6–4, 6–7^{(2–7)}, 6–4
Loss	29–9	May 2025	M25 Baotou, China	World Tennis Tour	Clay	(Australia) Jason Kubler	1–6, 1–6
Loss	29–10	Jun 2025	M15 Lu'an, China	World Tennis Tour	Hard	(China) Cui Jie	7–5, 3–6, 5–7

=== Doubles: 20 (13–7) ===
Legend ATP Challenger (4–0) ITF Futures (9–7)	Finals by surface Hard (10–5) Clay (3–2)

Result	W–L	Date	Tournament	Tier	Surface	Partner	Opponents	Score
Loss	0–1	Aug 2008	Italy F28, Piombino	Futures	Hard	(China) Xu Junchao	(Belgium) Niels Desein (Canada) Pierre-Ludovic Duclos	3–6, 3–6
Win	1–1	May 2009	China F4, Wuhan	Futures	Hard	(China) Wu Di	(China) Xue Feng (China) Zeng Shaoxuan	6–2, 6–1
Win	2–1	Jul 2014	China F8, Shenzhen	Futures	Hard	(China) Zhang Zhizhen	(China) Hua Runhao (China) Qiu Zhuoyang	6–4, 4–6, [10–3]
Loss	2–2	Apr 2015	China F1, Anning	Futures	Clay	(Chinese Taipei) Yang Tsung-Hua	(Chinese Taipei) Huang Liang-Chi (Spain) Enrique Lopez-Perez	3–6, 6–4, [7–10]
Win	3–2	May 2015	Anning, China	Challenger	Clay	(China) Wu Di	(India) Karunuday Singh (Australia) Andrew Whittington	6–3, 6–4
Loss	3–3	May 2015	China F5, Wuhan	Futures	Hard	(Japan) Arata Onukaza	(Chinese Taipei) Yi Chu-Huan (Chinese Taipei) Huang Liang-Chi	6–4, 1–6, [9–11]
Loss	3–4	May 2015	China F6, Wuhan	Futures	Hard	(Japan) Arata Onukaza	(China) Li Zhe (China) Gao Xin	5–7, 3–6
Win	4–4	Jun 2015	China F7, Wuhan	Futures	Hard	(China) Li Yi-Feng	(Belgium) Michael Geerts (China) Gao Xin	6–3, 2–6, [17–15]
Win	5–4	Jun 2015	China F8, Zhangjiagang	Futures	Hard	(Italy) Riccardo Ghedin	(China) Feng He (China) Ning Yuqing	6–2, 6–2
Win	6–4	Jul 2015	China F9, Jinhua	Futures	Hard	(Italy) Riccardo Ghedin	(China) Tao Jun Nan (China) Zhou Sheng Hao	6–0, 6–4
Loss	6–5	Jul 2015	China F10, Xi'an	Futures	Hard	(Chinese Taipei) Chen Ti	(China) Li Zhe (India) N.Sriram Balaji	6–4, 6–7^{(2–7)}, [11–13]
Win	7–5	Jul 2015	China F11, Xi'an	Futures	Hard	(Chinese Taipei) Hsieh Cheng-peng	(China) Li Zhe (India) N.Sriram Balaji	6–7^{(4–7)}, 6–3, [10–7]
Win	8–5	Aug 2015	China F13, Putian	Futures	Hard	(Chinese Taipei) Yi Chu-huan	(Japan) Bumpei Sato (Japan) Sho Katayama	6–2, 7–6^{(7–4)}
Loss	8–6	Aug 2015	Chinese Taipei F1, Kaohsiung	Futures	Hard	(Chinese Taipei) Yi Chu-huan	(Chinese Taipei) Hsieh Cheng-peng (Chinese Taipei) Yang Tsung-Hua	4–6, 6–7^{(5–7)}
Win	9–6	Sep 2015	Bangkok, Thailand	Challenger	Hard	(Italy) Riccardo Ghedin	(Chinese Taipei) Chen Ti (China) Li Zhe	6–2, 7–5
Win	10–6	May 2016	Anning, China	Challenger	Clay	(Italy) Riccardo Ghedin	(Ukraine) Denys Molchanov (Kazakhstan) Aleksandr Nedovyesov	4–6, 6–3, [10–6]
Win	11–6	May 2016	Rome, Italy	Challenger	Clay	(China) Li Zhe	(Netherlands) Sander Arends (Austria) T-S Weissborn	6–3, 3–6, [11–9]
Win	12–6	Jul 2016	China F10, Longyan	Futures	Hard	(China) Li Zhe	(China) Sun Fajing (China) Wang Aoran	7–6^{(7–1)}, 6–4
Win	13–6	Jan 2017	Hong Kong F5	Futures	Hard	(China) He Yecong	(Hong Kong) Karan Rastogi (Hong Kong) Wong Chun Hun	7–5, 6–4
Loss	13–7	Mar 2017	China F3, Anning	Futures	Clay	(China) Cai Zhao	(Australia) Thomas Fancutt (Australia) Brandon Walkin	4–6, 4–6
