= 2014 Anning Open – Men's doubles =

Men's doubles
- 2014 Anning Open

Final
- Champions: (Australia) Alex Bolt (Australia) Andrew Whittington
- Runners-up: (United Kingdom) Daniel Cox (China) Gong Maoxin
- Score: 6–4, 6–3

Events
Singles	men	women
Doubles	men	women
← 2013 ·	Anning Open	· 2015 →

Victor Baluda and Dino Marcan were the defending champions. Number 1 seeds, and 2014 Australian Open Quarterfinalists Alex Bolt and Andrew Whittington won their first title as a duo, with a 6–4, 6–3 defeat of Daniel Cox and Gong Maoxin.

== Seeds ==
1. (Australia) Alex Bolt / (Australia) Andrew Whittington (champions)
2. (Russia) Victor Baluda / (Russia) Konstantin Kravchuk (quarterfinals)
3. (Germany) Dominik Meffert / (Germany) Tim Puetz (semifinals)
4. (Chinese Taipei) Lee Hsin-han / (Australia) Matt Reid (first round)

== Draw ==
=== Key ===
- Q = Qualifier
- WC = Wild card
- LL = Lucky loser
- Alt = Alternate
- SE = Special exempt
- PR = Protected ranking
- ITF = ITF entry
- JE = Junior exempt
- w/o = Walkover
- r = Retired
- d = Defaulted
- SR = Special ranking

=== Draw ===
First round
1	(Australia) A Bolt (Australia) A Whittington	6	6
WC	(China) Wang Ruikai (China) Wang Ruixuan	3	1
(Republic of Ireland) J Cluskey (India) S Myneni	6^{0}	6	[13]
WC	(China) Gong Pengxiang (China) Gong Xiao	7^{7}	4	[15]
4	(Chinese Taipei) H-h Lee (Australia) M Reid	4	6^{3}
(Germany) R Becker (India) J Nedunchezhiyan	6	7^{7}
(Croatia) B Ćorić (United Kingdom) O Golding	3	6^{0}
(Lithuania) L Grigelis (Croatia) N Mektić	6	7^{7}
(Russia) A Kudryavtsev (Spain) R Ortega Olmedo	4	4
(Japan) Y Sugita (Thailand) D Udomchoke	6	6
WC	(China) S Liu (China) C Wang	3	3
3	(Germany) D Meffert (Germany) T Puetz	6	6
(United Kingdom) D Cox (China) M Gong	7	6
(United States) C Buchanan (Germany) Lukas Storck	5	1
(Belarus) S Betov (Belarus) A Bury	3	4
2	(Russia) V Baluda (Russia) K Kravchuk	6	6

Quarterfinals
1	(Australia) A Bolt (Australia) A Whittington	6	6
WC	(China) P Gong (China) X Gong	4	4
(Germany) R Becker (India) J Nedunchezhiyan	7^{7}	4	[8]
(Lithuania) L Grigelis (Croatia) N Mektić	6^{3}	6	[10]
(Japan) Y Sugita (Thailand) D Udomchoke	2	3
3	(Germany) D Meffert (Germany) T Puetz	6	6
(United Kingdom) D Cox (China) M Gong	6	6
2	(Russia) V Baluda (Russia) K Kravchuk	3	3

Semifinals
1	(Australia) A Bolt (Australia) A Whittington	6	6
(Lithuania) L Grigelis (Croatia) N Mektić	4	1
3	(Germany) D Meffert (Germany) T Puetz	1	1
(United Kingdom) D Cox (China) M Gong	6	6

Final
1	(Australia) A Bolt (Australia) A Whittington	6	6
(United Kingdom) D Cox (China) M Gong	4	3
