= 2014 Dunlop World Challenge – Men's singles =

Men's singles
- 2014 Dunlop World Challenge

Final
- Champion: (Japan) Go Soeda
- Runner-up: (Japan) Tatsuma Ito
- Score: 6–4, 7–5

Events
Singles	men	women
Doubles	men	women
← 2013 ·	Dunlop World Challenge	· 2015 →

Matthew Ebden was the defending champion, however he chose not to participate.

Go Soeda won the title, defeating Tatsuma Ito in the final, 6–4, 7–5.

== Seeds ==
1. (Japan) Tatsuma Ito (final)
2. (Japan) Go Soeda (champion)
3. (Russia) Alexander Kudryavtsev (second round)
4. (Japan) Yūichi Sugita (semifinals)
5. (Australia) James Duckworth (quarterfinals)
6. (Japan) Hiroki Moriya (first round)
7. (Australia) Luke Saville (first round)
8. (Japan) Yoshihito Nishioka (quarterfinals)

== Draw ==
=== Key ===
- Q = Qualifier
- WC = Wild card
- LL = Lucky loser
- Alt = Alternate
- SE = Special exempt
- PR = Protected ranking
- ITF = ITF entry
- JE = Junior exempt
- w/o = Walkover
- r = Retired
- d = Defaulted
- SR = Special ranking

=== Finals ===
Semifinals
1	(Japan) Tatsuma Ito	7	6
(Chinese Taipei) Chen Ti	5	2
4	(Japan) Yūichi Sugita	5	4
2	(Japan) Go Soeda	7	6

Finals
1	(Japan) Tatsuma Ito	4	5
2	(Japan) Go Soeda	6	7

=== Top half ===
First round
1	(Japan) T Ito	6	7^{7}
(United States) J Jung	4	6^{3}
(Japan) S Sekiguchi	4	6	7^{7}
WC	(Japan) H Kondo	6	1	6^{4}
WC	(Japan) A Onozawa	6	6
WC	(Japan) Y Watanuki	4	3
Q	(China) M Gong	4	6	7^{8}
7	(Australia) L Saville	6	2	6^{6}
3	(Russia) A Kudryavtsev	6	6
(South Korea) H Chung	3	2
(Australia) J-P Smith	6	6^{6}	6^{2}
(Chinese Taipei) T Chen	4	7^{8}	7^{7}
(Japan) Y Uchiyama	7^{8}	6
(Australia) G Jones	6^{6}	2
Q	(Russia) M Elgin	7^{7}	4	6
6	(Japan) H Moriya	6^{3}	6	2

Second round
1	(Japan) T Ito	6	6
(Japan) S Sekiguchi	1	3
WC	(Japan) A Onozawa	6	6
Q	(China) M Gong	4	4
3	(Russia) A Kudryavtsev	4	6	0
(Chinese Taipei) T Chen	6	2	6
(Japan) Y Uchiyama	7	6
Q	(Russia) M Elgin	5	2

Quarterfinals
1	(Japan) T Ito	7	6^{3}	6
WC	(Japan) A Onozawa	5	7^{7}	4
(Chinese Taipei) T Chen	4	6	6
(Japan) Y Uchiyama	6	3	3

Semifinals
1	(Japan) T Ito	7	6
(Chinese Taipei) T Chen	5	2

=== Bottom half ===
First round
8	(Japan) Y Nishioka	6	4	6
(Germany) R Becker	2	6	4
(Japan) Y Kibi	4	6	6
(Thailand) D Udomchoke	6	1	4
(Japan) T Matsui	5	7^{7}	1
Q	(South Korea) Nam J-s	7	6^{1}	6
Q	(Japan) S Imai	1	1
4	(Japan) Y Sugita	6	6
5	(Australia) J Duckworth	6	3	7
LL	(Japan) H Ehara	2	6	5
(Chinese Taipei) L-c Huang	3	4
WC	(Japan) S Katayama	6	6
(Australia) J Thompson	6	1	4
(Japan) T Niki	3	6	6
(Chinese Taipei) T-h Yang	2	7^{10}	2
2	(Japan) G Soeda	6	6^{8}	6

Second round
8	(Japan) Y Nishioka	7^{7}	2	6
(Japan) Y Kibi	6^{3}	6	3
Q	(South Korea) Nam J-s	2	6	5
4	(Japan) Y Sugita	6	2	7
5	(Australia) J Duckworth	6	6
WC	(Japan) S Katayama	3	2
(Japan) T Niki	3	1
2	(Japan) G Soeda	6	6

Quarterfinals
8	(Japan) Y Nishioka	4	1
4	(Japan) Y Sugita	6	6
5	(Australia) J Duckworth	4	6^{4}
2	(Japan) G Soeda	6	7^{7}

Semifinals
4	(Japan) Y Sugita	5	4
2	(Japan) G Soeda	7	6
