= 2013 Dunlop World Challenge – Men's doubles =

Men's doubles
- 2013 Dunlop World Challenge

Final
- Champions: (United States) Chase Buchanan (Slovenia) Blaž Rola
- Runners-up: (New Zealand) Marcus Daniell (New Zealand) Artem Sitak
- Score: 4–6, 6–3, [10–4]

Events
Singles	men	women
Doubles	men	women
← 2012 ·	Dunlop World Challenge	· 2014 →

Philipp Oswald and Mate Pavić were the defending champions, but Oswald chose not to compete. Mate Pavić partnered with Marin Draganja, but they lost in the semifinals.

Chase Buchanan and Blaž Rola won the title, defeating Marcus Daniell and Artem Sitak in the final, 4–6, 6–3, [10–4].

== Seeds ==
1. (Croatia) Marin Draganja / (Croatia) Mate Pavić (semifinals)
2. (Thailand) Sanchai Ratiwatana / (Thailand) Sonchat Ratiwatana (first round)
3. (United States) James Cerretani / (Canada) Adil Shamasdin (quarterfinals)
4. (France) Pierre-Hugues Herbert / (Germany) Frank Moser (withdrew)

== Draw ==
=== Key ===
- Q = Qualifier
- WC = Wild card
- LL = Lucky loser
- Alt = Alternate
- SE = Special exempt
- PR = Protected ranking
- ITF = ITF entry
- JE = Junior exempt
- w/o = Walkover
- r = Retired
- d = Defaulted
- SR = Special ranking

=== Draw ===
First round
1	(Croatia) M Draganja (Croatia) M Pavić	7^{7}	6
(Japan) Y Takahashi (Japan) Jumpei Yamasaki	6^{4}	2
(United Kingdom) B Klein (Chinese Taipei) T-h Yang	4	7^{10}	[12]
(Australia) S Groth (Australia) B Mitchell	6	6^{8}	[10]
Alt	(Japan) Shuichi Sekiguchi (United Kingdom) A Ward	5	3
WC	(Japan) Sho Katayama (Japan) B Sato	7	6
(Japan) T Matsui (Thailand) D Udomchoke	4	7^{8}	[8]
(United States) C Buchanan (Slovenia) B Rola	6	6^{6}	[10]
(Japan) Y Ito (Japan) G Soeda	4	6^{6}
(United Kingdom) Richard Gabb (Japan) H Kondo	6	7^{8}
(Japan) H Moriya (Japan) Y Uchiyama	6	4	[5]
3	(United States) J Cerretani (Canada) A Shamasdin	3	6	[10]
(Chinese Taipei) T Chen (Spain) E López-Pérez	4	2
WC	(Japan) T Ito (Japan) T Suzuki	6	6
(New Zealand) M Daniell (New Zealand) A Sitak	7	6
2	(Thailand) Sa Ratiwatana (Thailand) So Ratiwatana	5	3

Quarterfinals
1	(Croatia) M Draganja (Croatia) M Pavić	6	6
(United Kingdom) B Klein (Chinese Taipei) T-h Yang	4	2
WC	(Japan) S Katayama (Japan) B Sato	5	2
(United States) C Buchanan (Slovenia) B Rola	7	6
(United Kingdom) R Gabb (Japan) H Kondo	4	6	[10]
3	(United States) J Cerretani (Canada) A Shamasdin	6	3	[4]
WC	(Japan) T Ito (Japan) T Suzuki	6^{5}	1
(New Zealand) M Daniell (New Zealand) A Sitak	7^{7}	6

Semifinals
1	(Croatia) M Draganja (Croatia) M Pavić	6^{1}	4
(United States) C Buchanan (Slovenia) B Rola	7^{7}	6
(United Kingdom) R Gabb (Japan) H Kondo	1	4
(New Zealand) M Daniell (New Zealand) A Sitak	6	6

Final
(United States) C Buchanan (Slovenia) B Rola	4	6	[10]
(New Zealand) M Daniell (New Zealand) A Sitak	6	3	[4]
