= 2014 Dunlop World Challenge – Men's doubles =

Men's doubles
- 2014 Dunlop World Challenge

Final
- Champions: (Japan) Toshihide Matsui (Japan) Yasutaka Uchiyama
- Runners-up: (Japan) Bumpei Sato (Chinese Taipei) Yang Tsung-hua
- Score: 7–6^{(8–6)}, 6–2

Events
Singles	men	women
Doubles	men	women
← 2013 ·	Dunlop World Challenge	· 2015 →

Chase Buchanan and Blaž Rola were the defending champions, but both players chose not to participate.

Toshihide Matsui and Yasutaka Uchiyama won the title, defeating Bumpei Sato and Yang Tsung-hua in the final, 7–6^{(8–6)}, 6–2.

== Seeds ==
1. (New Zealand) Marcus Daniell / (New Zealand) Artem Sitak (semifinals)
2. (Thailand) Sanchai Ratiwatana / (Thailand) Sonchat Ratiwatana (quarterfinals)
3. (China) Gong Maoxin / (Chinese Taipei) Peng Hsien-yin (quarterfinals)
4. (Chinese Taipei) Chen Ti / (Chinese Taipei) Huang Liang-chi (quarterfinals)

== Draw ==
=== Key ===
- Q = Qualifier
- WC = Wild card
- LL = Lucky loser
- Alt = Alternate
- SE = Special exempt
- PR = Protected ranking
- ITF = ITF entry
- JE = Junior exempt
- w/o = Walkover
- r = Retired
- d = Defaulted
- SR = Special ranking

First round
1	(New Zealand) M Daniell (New Zealand) A Sitak	6	6
PR	(Australia) J Duckworth (Australia) G Jones	2	2
(Chinese Taipei) H-h Lee (Thailand) D Udomchoke	6	7^{7}
(Japan) H Moriya (Japan) A Onozawa	3	6^{3}
4	(Chinese Taipei) T Chen (Chinese Taipei) L-c Huang	3	7^{8}	[10]
(Australia) L Saville (Australia) J Thompson	6	6^{6}	[6]
(Australia) A Hubble (Australia) J-P Smith	4	6^{4}
(Japan) B Sato (Chinese Taipei) T-h Yang	6	7^{7}
(South Korea) H Chung (South Korea) J-s Nam	3	6	[8]
WC	(Japan) H Kondo (Japan) T Suzuki	6	2	[10]
WC	(Japan) K Watanuki (Japan) Y Watanuki	2	1
3	(China) M Gong (Chinese Taipei) H-y Peng	6	6
WC	(Japan) M Noguchi (Japan) M Saisai	3	4
(Japan) T Matsui (Japan) Y Uchiyama	6	6
(Russia) M Elgin (Russia) A Kudryavtsev	2	4
2	(Thailand) Sa Ratiwatana (Thailand) So Ratiwatana	6	6

Quarterfinals
1	(New Zealand) M Daniell (New Zealand) A Sitak	7^{7}	6
(Chinese Taipei) H-h Lee (Thailand) D Udomchoke	6^{4}	3
4	(Chinese Taipei) T Chen (Chinese Taipei) L-c Huang	5	7	[5]
(Japan) B Sato (Chinese Taipei) T-h Yang	7	5	[10]
(Japan) H Kondo (Japan) T Suzuki	6	7^{8}
3	(China) M Gong (Chinese Taipei) H-y Peng	2	6^{6}
(Japan) T Matsui (Japan) Y Uchiyama	6^{8}	6	[10]
2	(Thailand) Sa Ratiwatana (Thailand) So Ratiwatana	7^{10}	2	[8]

Semifinals
1	(New Zealand) M Daniell (New Zealand) A Sitak	6	4	[8]
(Japan) B Sato (Chinese Taipei) T-h Yang	4	6	[10]
(Japan) H Kondo (Japan) T Suzuki	6^{6}	1
(Japan) T Matsui (Japan) Y Uchiyama	7^{8}	6

Final
(Japan) B Sato (Chinese Taipei) T-h Yang	6^{6}	2
(Japan) T Matsui (Japan) Y Uchiyama	7^{8}	6
