= 2013 ATP China International Tennis Challenge – Anning – Doubles =

Anning – Doubles
- 2013 ATP China International Tennis Challenge – Anning

Final
- Champions: (Russia) Victor Baluda (Croatia) Dino Marcan
- Runners-up: (Australia) Samuel Groth (Australia) John-Patrick Smith
- Score: 6–7^{(5–7)}, 6–4, [10–7]

Events
Singles	Doubles
← 2012 ·	ATP China International Tennis Challenge – Anning	· 2014 →

Sanchai Ratiwatana and Sonchat Ratiwatana were the defending champions, but they lost to Victor Baluda and Dino Marcan in the first round.
Baluda and Marcan defeated Samuel Groth and John-Patrick Smith 6–7^{(5–7)}, 6–4, [10–7] in the final to win the title.

== Seeds ==
1. (Thailand) Sanchai Ratiwatana / (Thailand) Sonchat Ratiwatana (first round)
2. (Australia) Samuel Groth / (Australia) John-Patrick Smith (final)
3. (Australia) Chris Guccione / (Australia) Matt Reid (semifinals)
4. (Chinese Taipei) Lee Hsin-han / (Chinese Taipei) Peng Hsien-yin (quarterfinals)

== Draw ==
=== Key ===
- Q = Qualifier
- WC = Wild card
- LL = Lucky loser
- Alt = Alternate
- SE = Special exempt
- PR = Protected ranking
- ITF = ITF entry
- JE = Junior exempt
- w/o = Walkover
- r = Retired
- d = Defaulted
- SR = Special ranking

=== Draw ===
First round
1	(Thailand) Sa Ratiwatana (Thailand) So Ratiwatana	2	4
(Russia) V Baluda (Croatia) D Marcan	6	6
(Lithuania) L Grigelis (Republic of Ireland) J McGee	4	6^{5}
(China) M Gong (China) Z Zhang	6	7^{7}
3	(Australia) C Guccione (Australia) M Reid	6	6
(Japan) H Moriya (Japan) Y Uchiyama	4	2
(France) V Millot (France) J Ouanna	6	3	[10]
WC	(China) Gao Peng (China) W Gao	3	6	[8]
(Australia) A Bolt (New Zealand) J Statham	6	6
(Japan) T Matsui (China) D Wu	2	0
(Chinese Taipei) C-p Hsieh (Chinese Taipei) T-h Yang	6	1	[8]
4	(Chinese Taipei) H-h Lee (Chinese Taipei) H-y Peng	3	6	[10]
WC	(China) Feng Nian (China) C Wang	5	5	[5]
WC	(China) Tan Haiyun (China) Wang Ruikai	5	7	[10]
(Australia) M Ebden (United Kingdom) J Ward	3	4
2	(Australia) S Groth (Australia) J-P Smith	6	6

Quarterfinals
(Russia) V Baluda (Croatia) D Marcan	6	5	[10]
(China) M Gong (China) Z Zhang	1	7	[6]
3	(Australia) C Guccione (Australia) M Reid	6	6
(France) V Millot (France) J Ouanna	4	1
(Australia) A Bolt (New Zealand) J Statham	7^{7}	6
4	(Chinese Taipei) H-h Lee (Chinese Taipei) H-y Peng	6^{4}	4
WC	(China) H Tan (China) R Wang	4	6^{5}
2	(Australia) S Groth (Australia) J-P Smith	6	7^{7}

Semifinals
(Russia) V Baluda (Croatia) D Marcan	6	6
3	(Australia) C Guccione (Australia) M Reid	4	2
(Australia) A Bolt (New Zealand) J Statham	6	5	[7]
2	(Australia) S Groth (Australia) J-P Smith	4	7	[10]

Final
(Russia) V Baluda (Croatia) D Marcan	6^{5}	6	[10]
2	(Australia) S Groth (Australia) J-P Smith	7^{7}	4	[7]
