= 2013 ATP China International Tennis Challenge – Anning – Singles =

Anning – Singles
- 2013 ATP China International Tennis Challenge – Anning

Final
- Champion: (Hungary) Márton Fucsovics
- Runner-up: (United Kingdom) James Ward
- Score: 7–5, 3–6, 6–3

Events
Singles	Doubles
← 2012 ·	ATP China International Tennis Challenge – Anning	· 2014 →

Grega Žemlja was the defending champion but chose not to compete.
Márton Fucsovics won the title by defeating James Ward 7–5, 3–6, 6–3 in the final.

== Seeds ==
1. (Australia) Matthew Ebden (quarterfinals)
2. (Belgium) Ruben Bemelmans (first round)
3. (China) Zhang Ze (quarterfinals)
4. (France) Josselin Ouanna (second round)
5. (China) Wu Di (first round)
6. (Japan) Hiroki Moriya (first round)
7. (France) Vincent Millot (first round)
8. (Australia) Samuel Groth (first round)

== Draw ==
=== Key ===
- Q = Qualifier
- WC = Wild card
- LL = Lucky loser
- Alt = Alternate
- SE = Special exempt
- PR = Protected ranking
- ITF = ITF entry
- JE = Junior exempt
- w/o = Walkover
- r = Retired
- d = Defaulted
- SR = Special ranking

=== Finals ===
Semifinals
(Croatia) Dino Marcan	4	3
(Hungary) Márton Fucsovics	6	6
Q	(United Kingdom) James Ward	6	5	6
(Chinese Taipei) Yang Tsung-hua	4	7	2

Final
(Hungary) Márton Fucsovics	7	3	6
Q	(United Kingdom) James Ward	5	6	3

=== Top half ===
First round
1	(Australia) M Ebden	6	6
(China) M Gong	4	1
Q	(Australia) C Guccione	6	6
WC	(China) Li Yucheng	4	1
Q	(China) Zhao Cai	3	2
(Croatia) D Marcan	6	6
(Australia) J-P Smith	7^{7}	6
8	(Australia) S Groth	6^{4}	3
3	(China) Z Zhang	6	6
(South Korea) J-s Nam	3	4
(Japan) T Matsui	3	0
(New Zealand) J Statham	6	6
(Lithuania) L Grigelis	6	6
WC	(China) Gao Peng	4	1
(Hungary) M Fucsovics	6	6
6	(Japan) H Moriya	0	3

Second round
1	(Australia) M Ebden	6	6
Q	(Australia) C Guccione	4	4
(Croatia) D Marcan	1	6	6
(Australia) J-P Smith	6	3	2
3	(China) Z Zhang	6^{5}	6	7
(New Zealand) J Statham	7^{7}	4	5
(Lithuania) L Grigelis	1	4
(Hungary) M Fucsovics	6	6

Quarterfinals
1	(Australia) M Ebden	7^{7}	3	2
(Croatia) D Marcan	6^{3}	6	6
3	(China) Z Zhang	5	3
(Hungary) M Fucsovics	7	6

Semifinals
(Croatia) D Marcan	4	3
(Hungary) M Fucsovics	6	6

=== Bottom half ===
First round
7	(France) V Millot	3	6	2
(India) J Nedunchezhiyan	6	3	6
(Serbia) D Petrović	6	6
(Japan) Y Uchiyama	4	3
WC	(China) C Wang	4	2
Q	(United Kingdom) J Ward	6	6
WC	(China) Wang Ruikai	4	0
4	(France) J Ouanna	6	6
5	(China) D Wu	4	3
(Republic of Ireland) J McGee	6	6
(Australia) M Reid	6	2	1
(Chinese Taipei) T-h Yang	3	6	6
(Australia) A Bolt	4	6	3
(Russia) V Baluda	6	3	6
Q	(Japan) T Ito	6	6
2	(Belgium) R Bemelmans	2	4

Second round
(India) J Nedunchezhiyan	4	4
(Serbia) D Petrović	6	6
Q	(United Kingdom) J Ward	2	6	6
4	(France) J Ouanna	6	3	2
(Republic of Ireland) J McGee	3	5
(Chinese Taipei) T-h Yang	6	7
(Russia) V Baluda	4	6	2
Q	(Japan) T Ito	6	3	6

Quarterfinals
(Serbia) D Petrović	6	6^{5}	0
Q	(United Kingdom) J Ward	0	7^{7}	6
(Chinese Taipei) T-h Yang	6	6
Q	(Japan) T Ito	3	3

Semifinals
Q	(United Kingdom) J Ward	6	5	6
(Chinese Taipei) T-h Yang	4	7	2
