= 2014 Anning Open – Men's singles =

Men's singles
- 2014 Anning Open

Final
- Champion: (Australia) Alex Bolt
- Runner-up: (Croatia) Nikola Mektić
- Score: 6–2, 7–5

Events
Singles	men	women
Doubles	men	women
← 2013 ·	Anning Open	· 2015 →

Márton Fucsovics was the defending champion. Australian Alex Bolt won his first Challenger title, with a 6–2, 7–5 defeat of Nikola Metkić in the final.

== Seeds ==
1. (Japan) Yūichi Sugita (second round)
2. (Slovenia) Grega Žemlja (Quarter finals)
3. (Russia) Alexander Kudryavtsev (second round)
4. (China) Zhang Ze (second round, retired)
5. (Australia) Matt Reid (Quarter finals)
6. (United Kingdom) Daniel Cox (second round)
7. (Lithuania) Laurynas Grigelis (second round)
8. (Russia) Konstantin Kravchuk (second round)

== Draw ==
=== Key ===
- Q = Qualifier
- WC = Wild card
- LL = Lucky loser
- Alt = Alternate
- SE = Special exempt
- PR = Protected ranking
- ITF = ITF entry
- JE = Junior exempt
- w/o = Walkover
- r = Retired
- d = Defaulted
- SR = Special ranking

=== Finals ===
Semifinals
(Australia) Alex Bolt	6	7^{7}
(Croatia) Borna Ćorić	4	6^{4}
(Australia) Jordan Thompson	5	6^{4}
(Croatia) Nikola Mektić	7	7^{7}

Final
(Australia) Alex Bolt	6	7
(Croatia) Nikola Mektić	2	5

=== Top half ===
First round
1	(Japan) Y Sugita	4	7	6
(Russia) V Baluda	6	5	4
(Australia) A Bolt	6	3	7^{7}
(Germany) D Meffert	3	6	6^{5}
(United States) C Buchanan	6	6
WC	(China) Li Yuanfeng	3	3
Q	(Italy) Giuseppe Menga	2	6^{5r}
8	(Russia) K Kravchuk	6	6^{5}
4	(China) Z Zhang	6	6
Q	(Belarus) A Bury	4	4
(Croatia) B Ćorić	6	6
(United Kingdom) O Golding	2	3
WC	(China) S Liu	4	4
Q	(China) C Wang	6	6
WC	(China) Wang Ruikai	5	3
5	(Australia) M Reid	7	6

Second round
1	(Japan) Y Sugita	0	6^{4}
(Australia) A Bolt	6	7^{7}
(United States) C Buchanan	7^{7}	3	6
8	(Russia) K Kravchuk	6^{2}	6	4
4	(China) Z Zhang	0	0^{r}
(Croatia) B Ćorić	6	2
Q	(China) C Wang	3	4
5	(Australia) M Reid	6	6

Quarterfinals
(Australia) A Bolt	6	6	6
(United States) C Buchanan	4	7	4
(Croatia) B Ćorić	6	6
5	(Australia) M Reid	3	4

Semifinals
(Australia) A Bolt	6	7^{7}
(Croatia) B Ćorić	4	6^{4}

=== Bottom half ===
First round
7	(Lithuania) L Grigelis	6	4	6
(Japan) Y Ito	3	6	1
(India) J Nedunchezhiyan	2	3
(Australia) J Thompson	6	6
(India) S Myneni	6	3	3
(Australia) A Whittington	3	6	6
Q	(Republic of Ireland) J Cluskey	6^{3}	3
3	(Russia) A Kudryavtsev	7^{7}	6
6	(United Kingdom) D Cox	4	6	6
(South Korea) H Chung	6	3	3
(Germany) R Becker	6^{5}	4
(Croatia) N Mektić	7^{7}	6
(Thailand) D Udomchoke	3	6^{2}
(Spain) R Ortega Olmedo	6	7^{7}
WC	(China) M Gong	6	5	2
2	(Slovenia) G Žemlja	4	7	6

Second round
7	(Lithuania) L Grigelis	6	5	2
(Australia) J Thompson	3	7	6
(Australia) A Whittington	7^{7}	6
3	(Russia) A Kudryavtsev	6^{1}	4
6	(United Kingdom) D Cox	3	4
(Croatia) N Mektić	6	6
(Spain) R Ortega Olmedo	2	6	6^{6}
2	(Slovenia) G Žemlja	6	3	7^{8}

Quarterfinals
(Australia) J Thompson	6	6
(Australia) A Whittington	4	4
(Croatia) N Mektić	6^{5}	6	6
2	(Slovenia) G Žemlja	7^{7}	3	3

Semifinals
(Australia) J Thompson	5	6^{4}
(Croatia) N Mektić	7	7^{7}
