= 2014 Anning Open – Women's doubles =

Women's doubles
- 2014 Anning Open

Final
- Champions: (China) Han Xinyun (China) Zhang Kailin
- Runners-up: (Thailand) Varatchaya Wongteanchai (Hong Kong) Zhang Ling
- Score: 6–4, 6–2

Events
Singles	men	women
Doubles	men	women
← 2013 ·	Anning Open	· 2015 →

This tournament was a new addition to the ITF Women's Circuit.

Han Xinyun and Zhang Kailin won the inaugural tournament, defeating Varatchaya Wongteanchai and Zhang Ling in the final, 6–4, 6–2.

== Seeds ==
1. (Russia) Irina Khromacheva / (Russia) Marina Melnikova (quarterfinals)
2. (Japan) Nao Hibino / (Chinese Taipei) Hsu Wen-hsin (quarterfinals)
3. (Japan) Miyu Kato / (Japan) Riko Sawayanagi (first round)
4. (Poland) Justyna Jegiołka / (Japan) Chiaki Okadaue (first round; withdrew)

== Draw ==
=== Key ===
- Q = Qualifier
- WC = Wild card
- LL = Lucky loser
- Alt = Alternate
- SE = Special exempt
- PR = Protected ranking
- ITF = ITF entry
- JE = Junior exempt
- w/o = Walkover
- r = Retired
- d = Defaulted
- SR = Special ranking

First round
1	(Russia) I Khromacheva (Russia) M Melnikova	2	6	[10]
(New Zealand) E Hayman (Bulgaria) A Naydenova	6	4	[5]
(China) X Han (China) K Zhang	6	6
(China) B Wang (China) Y Wang	4	1
3	(Japan) M Kato (Japan) R Sawayanagi	4	6^{6}
WC	(China) S Chen (China) X Sun	6	7^{8}
(Netherlands) C Burger (India) A Raina	6	3	[8]
(China) Y Li (China) L Zhu	3	6	[10]
(Slovenia) T Majerič (Germany) N Zander	6	6
WC	(China) Mengj Yi (China) Mengy Yi	3	1
(China) A Gai (China) A Zhu	w/o
4	(Poland) J Jegiołka (Japan) C Okadaue
(Thailand) V Wongteanchai (Hong Kong) L Zhang	0	6	[10]
(China) H Tang (China) Zh Yang	6	2	[4]
(Australia) J Moriarty (China) S Xu	2	4
2	(Japan) N Hibino (Chinese Taipei) W-h Hsu	6	6

Quarterfinals
1	(Russia) I Khromacheva (Russia) M Melnikova	6	5	[6]
(China) X Han (China) K Zhang	4	7	[10]
WC	(China) S Chen (China) X Sun	5	6^{2}
(China) Y Li (China) L Zhu	7	7^{7}
(Slovenia) T Majerič (Germany) N Zander	1	6	[6]
(China) A Gai (China) A Zhu	6	4	[10]
(Thailand) V Wongteanchai (Hong Kong) L Zhang	6	6
2	(Japan) N Hibino (Chinese Taipei) W-h Hsu	4	2

Semifinals
(China) X Han (China) K Zhang	6	2	[13]
(China) Y Li (China) L Zhu	4	6	[11]
(China) A Gai (China) A Zhu	2	1
(Thailand) V Wongteanchai (Hong Kong) L Zhang	6	6

Final
(China) X Han (China) K Zhang	6	6
(Thailand) V Wongteanchai (Hong Kong) L Zhang	4	2
