= 2012 ATP China International Tennis Challenge – Anning – Singles =

Anning – Singles
- 2012 ATP China International Tennis Challenge – Anning

Final
- Champion: (Slovenia) Grega Žemlja
- Runner-up: (Slovenia) Aljaž Bedene
- Score: 1–6, 7–5, 6–3

Events
Singles	Doubles
ATP China International Tennis Challenge – Anning	· 2013 →

Grega Žemlja won the first edition of the tournament by defeating Aljaž Bedene 1–6, 7–5, 6–3 in the final.

== Seeds ==
1. (Slovenia) Aljaž Bedene (final)
2. (Slovenia) Grega Žemlja (champion)
3. (Chinese Taipei) Yang Tsung-hua (semifinals)
4. (Japan) Yuichi Sugita (second round)
5. (China) Zhang Ze (quarterfinals)
6. (France) Josselin Ouanna (quarterfinals)
7. (Japan) Hiroki Moriya (quarterfinals)
8. (France) Laurent Rochette (semifinals)

== Draw ==
=== Key ===
- Q = Qualifier
- WC = Wild card
- LL = Lucky loser
- Alt = Alternate
- SE = Special exempt
- PR = Protected ranking
- ITF = ITF entry
- JE = Junior exempt
- w/o = Walkover
- r = Retired
- d = Defaulted
- SR = Special ranking

=== Finals ===
Semifinals
1	(Slovenia) Aljaž Bedene	6	6
3	(Chinese Taipei) Yang Tsung-hua	3	3
8	(France) Laurent Rochette	6^{2}	6	3
2	(Slovenia) Grega Žemlja	7^{7}	3	6

Final
1	(Slovenia) Aljaž Bedene	6	5	3
2	(Slovenia) Grega Žemlja	1	7	6

=== Top half ===
First round
1	(Slovenia) A Bedene	6	6
(Egypt) M Safwat	3	1
(South Africa) R Roelofse	4	7^{7}	2
(Japan) Junn Mitsuhashi	6	6^{2}	6
Q	(Chinese Taipei) Yi Chu-huan	4	6	7
(Australia) A Feeney	6	3	5
(Thailand) K Wachiramanowong	7^{7}	4	6^{4}
6	(France) J Ouanna	6^{1}	6	7^{7}
3	(Chinese Taipei) T-h Yang	6	3	6
WC	(China) Ouyang Bowen	1	6	3
(South Korea) Y-k Lim	7^{7}	6^{3}	6^{3}
(Australia) S Groth	6^{4}	7^{7}	7^{7}
(Japan) Kento Takeuchi	7^{7}	6
(India) Vijayant Malik	6^{3}	4
Q	(Australia) Matthew Barton	6^{5}	7	4
5	(China) Z Zhang	7^{7}	5	6

Second round
1	(Slovenia) A Bedene	6	6
(Japan) Junn Mitsuhashi	2	3
Q	(Chinese Taipei) Yi Chu-huan	4	4
6	(France) J Ouanna	6	6
3	(Chinese Taipei) T-h Yang	6	4	7^{7}
(Australia) S Groth	4	6	6^{5}
(Japan) Kento Takeuchi	2	4
5	(China) Z Zhang	6	6

Quarterfinals
1	(Slovenia) A Bedene	6	7
6	(France) J Ouanna	4	5
3	(Chinese Taipei) T-h Yang	6	3	6
5	(China) Z Zhang	3	6	3

Semifinals
1	(Slovenia) A Bedene	6	6
3	(Chinese Taipei) T-h Yang	3	3

=== Bottom half ===
First round
8	(France) Laurent Rochette	6	6
(South Korea) W-s Jun	2	4
WC	(China) W Gao	1	3
(France) P-H Herbert	6	6
(China) Chang Yu	6	6
WC	(China) Wang Chuhan	1	4
(Monaco) B Balleret	4	6^{0}
4	(Japan) Y Sugita	6	7^{7}
7	(Japan) Hiroki Moriya	6	6
Q	(Chinese Taipei) H-h Lee	2	2
WC	(China) Gao Xin	5	6	1
(Japan) H Kondo	7	3	6
Q	(Japan) Arata Onozawa	5	6^{5}
(Chinese Taipei) L-c Huang	7	7^{7}
(India) Jeevan Nedunchezhiyan	3	2
2	(Slovenia) G Žemlja	6	6

Second round
8	(France) Laurent Rochette	7^{7}	7^{7}
(France) P-H Herbert	6^{5}	6^{5}
(China) Chang Yu	1	6	6
4	(Japan) Y Sugita	6	4	4
7	(Japan) Hiroki Moriya	6	6
(Japan) H Kondo	4	4
(Chinese Taipei) L-c Huang	3	6^{9}
2	(Slovenia) G Žemlja	6	7^{11}

Quarterfinals
8	(France) Laurent Rochette	7^{8}	6
(China) Chang Yu	6^{6}	3
7	(Japan) Hiroki Moriya	2	1
2	(Slovenia) G Žemlja	6	6

Semifinals
8	(France) Laurent Rochette	6^{2}	6	3
2	(Slovenia) G Žemlja	7^{7}	3	6
