= 2014 Dunlop World Challenge =

Professional tennis tournament

- Date: 17–23 November
- Edition: 7th
- Category: ATP Challenger Tour (men); ITF Women's Circuit (women)
- Prize money: $40,000+H (men) $75,000+H (women)
- Surface: Carpet (indoor)
- Location: Toyota, Aichi, Japan
- Venue: Sky Hall Toyota

Champions

Men's singles
- (Japan) Go Soeda

Women's singles
- (Belgium) An-Sophie Mestach

Men's doubles
- (Japan) Toshihide Matsui / (Japan) Yasutaka Uchiyama

Women's doubles
- (Japan) Eri Hozumi / (Japan) Makoto Ninomiya
← 2013 ·	Dunlop World Challenge	· 2015 →

The 2014 Dunlop World Challenge was a professional tennis tournament played on indoor carpet courts. It was the 7th edition of the tournament which was part of the 2014 ATP Challenger Tour and the 2014 ITF Women's Circuit, offering a total of $75,000+H for women and $40,000+H for men in prize money respectively. It took place in Toyota, Japan, on 17–23 November 2014.

== Men's entrants ==
=== Seeds ===
Country	Player	Rank^{1}	Seed
JPN	Tatsuma Ito	103	1
JPN	Go Soeda	116	2
RUS	Alexander Kudryavtsev	122	3
JPN	Yūichi Sugita	126	4
AUS	James Duckworth	132	5
JPN	Hiroki Moriya	146	6
AUS	Luke Saville	158	7
JPN	Yoshihito Nishioka	164	8

- ^{1} Rankings as of 10 November 2014

=== Other entrants ===
The following players received wildcards into the singles main draw:

- (Japan) Sho Katayama
- (Japan) Hiroki Kondo
- (Japan) Arata Onozawa
- (Japan) Yusuke Watanuki

The following players received entry from the qualifying draw:

- (Russia) Mikhail Elgin
- (China) Gong Maoxin
- (Japan) Shintaro Imai
- (South Korea) Nam Ji-sung

The following player received entry into the singles main draw as a lucky loser:

- (Japan) Hiroyasu Ehara

The following player received entry from a protected ranking:

- (Australia) Greg Jones

== Women's entrants ==
=== Seeds ===
Country	Player	Rank^{1}	Seed
THA	Luksika Kumkhum	96	1
JPN	Kimiko Date-Krumm	115	2
JPN	Misaki Doi	122	3
BEL	An-Sophie Mestach	125	4
JPN	Misa Eguchi	127	5
JPN	Eri Hozumi	144	6
JPN	Hiroko Kuwata	152	7
CHN	Xu Yifan	183	8

- ^{1} Rankings as of 10 November 2014

=== Other entrants ===
The following players received wildcards into the singles main draw:

- (Japan) Miyu Kato
- (Russia) Ksenia Lykina
- (Japan) Mari Tanaka
- (Japan) Yuuki Tanaka

The following players received entry from the qualifying draw:

- (Japan) Kanae Hisami
- (United States) Tori Kinard
- (Japan) Ayaka Okuno
- (Japan) Akiko Omae

The following player received entry into the singles main draw as a lucky loser:

- (Japan) Yuka Higuchi

The following player received entry from a protected ranking:

- (Chinese Taipei) Chang Kai-chen

== Champions ==
=== Men's singles ===
- (Japan) Go Soeda def. (Japan) Tatsuma Ito 6–4, 7–5

=== Women's singles ===
- (Belgium) An-Sophie Mestach def. (Japan) Shuko Aoyama 6–1, 6–1

=== Men's doubles ===
- (Japan) Toshihide Matsui / (Japan) Yasutaka Uchiyama def. (Japan) Bumpei Sato / (Chinese Taipei) Yang Tsung-hua 7–6^{(8–6)}, 6–2

=== Women's doubles ===
- (Japan) Eri Hozumi / (Japan) Makoto Ninomiya def. (Japan) Shuko Aoyama / (Japan) Junri Namigata 6–3, 7–5
