= 2013 Dunlop World Challenge =

- Date: 18–24 November
- Edition: 6th
- Category: ATP Challenger Tour (men); ITF Women's Circuit (women)
- Prize money: $35,000+H (men) $75,000+H (women)
- Surface: Carpet (indoor)
- Location: Toyota, Aichi, Japan

Champions

Men's singles
- (Australia) Matthew Ebden

Women's singles
- (Thailand) Luksika Kumkhum

Men's doubles
- (United States) Chase Buchanan / (Slovenia) Blaž Rola

Women's doubles
- (Japan) Shuko Aoyama / (Japan) Misaki Doi
← 2012 ·	Dunlop World Challenge	· 2014 →

The 2013 Dunlop World Challenge was a professional tennis tournament played on indoor carpet courts. It was the sixth edition of the tournament which was part of the 2013 ITF Women's Circuit and the 2013 ATP Challenger Tour. It took place in Toyota, Aichi, Japan, on 18–24 November 2013.

== Men's singles entrants ==
=== Seeds ===
Country	Player	Rank^{1}	Seed
AUS	Matthew Ebden	95	1
JPN	Go Soeda	114	2
FRA	Pierre-Hugues Herbert	162	3
JPN	Yūichi Sugita	163	4
JPN	Tatsuma Ito	170	5
GBR	James Ward	172	6
JPN	Hiroki Moriya	177	7
SLO	Blaž Rola	186	8

- ^{1} Rankings as of 11 November 2013

=== Other entrants ===
The following players received wildcards into the singles main draw:

- (Japan) Sho Katayama
- (Japan) Takao Suzuki
- (Japan) Yusuke Watanuki
- (Japan) Jumpei Yamasaki

The following players received special exempt into the singles main draw:

- (Croatia) Borna Ćorić

The following players received entry from the qualifying draw:

- (Japan) Yuuya Kiba
- (Japan) Takashi Saito
- (New Zealand) Artem Sitak
- (Thailand) Danai Udomchoke

== Women's singles entrants ==
=== Seeds ===
Country	Player	Rank^{1}	Seed
JPN	Kurumi Nara	75	1
JPN	Misaki Doi	90	2
THA	Luksika Kumkhum	107	3
KAZ	Zarina Diyas	164	4
JPN	Sachie Ishizu	197	5
SUI	Belinda Bencic	212	6
CHN	Wang Qiang	216	7
JPN	Eri Hozumi	217	8

- ^{1} Rankings as of 11 November 2013

=== Other entrants ===
The following players received wildcards into the singles main draw:

- (Japan) Haruka Kaji
- (Japan) Miyu Kato
- (Japan) Makoto Ninomiya
- (Japan) Yuuki Tanaka

The following players received entry from the qualifying draw:

- (Japan) Kanae Hisami
- (Japan) Hiroko Kuwata
- (Japan) Emi Mutaguchi
- (Japan) Akiko Yonemura

== Champions ==
=== Men's singles ===
- (Australia) Matthew Ebden def. (Japan) Yūichi Sugita 6–3, 6–2

=== Women's singles ===
- (Thailand) Luksika Kumkhum def. (Japan) Hiroko Kuwata 3–6, 6–1, 6–3

=== Men's doubles ===
- (United States) Chase Buchanan / (Slovenia) Blaž Rola def. (New Zealand) Marcus Daniell / (New Zealand) Artem Sitak 4–6, 6–3, [10–4]

=== Women's doubles ===
- (Japan) Shuko Aoyama / (Japan) Misaki Doi def. (Japan) Eri Hozumi / (Japan) Makoto Ninomiya 7–6^{(7–1)}, 2–6, [11–9]
