= 2014 Anning Open – Women's singles =

Women's singles
- 2014 Anning Open

Final
- Champion: (China) Zheng Saisai
- Runner-up: (Serbia) Jovana Jakšić
- Score: 6–2, 6–3

Events
Singles	men	women
Doubles	men	women
← 2013 ·	Anning Open	· 2015 →

This tournament was a new addition to the ITF Women's Circuit.

Zheng Saisai won the inaugural tournament defeating Jovana Jakšić in the final, 6–2, 6–3.

== Seeds ==
1. (Serbia) Jovana Jakšić (final)
2. (Chinese Taipei) Hsieh Su-wei (quarterfinals)
3. (Slovenia) Tadeja Majerič (semifinals)
4. (China) Zheng Saisai (champion)
5. (Russia) Irina Khromacheva (second round)
6. (Russia) Marina Melnikova (quarterfinals)
7. (Netherlands) Cindy Burger (quarterfinals)
8. (Japan) Nao Hibino (second round)

== Main draw ==
=== Key ===
- Q = Qualifier
- WC = Wild card
- LL = Lucky loser
- Alt = Alternate
- SE = Special exempt
- PR = Protected ranking
- ITF = ITF entry
- JE = Junior exempt
- w/o = Walkover
- r = Retired
- d = Defaulted
- SR = Special ranking

=== Finals ===
Semifinals
1	(Serbia) Jovana Jakšić	7^{7}	7
3	(Slovenia) Tadeja Majerič	6^{3}	5
4	(China) Zheng Saisai	7^{7}	5	6
(Australia) Monique Adamczak	6^{5}	7	2

Final
1	(Serbia) Jovana Jakšić	2	3
4	(China) Zheng Saisai	6	6

=== Top half ===
First round
1	(Serbia) J Jakšić	6	6
(India) A Raina	1	4
(China) Zi Yang	6	4	6
(Japan) M Kato	4	6	2
(China) Y Hu	6	4	4
(China) H Tang	4	6	6
WC	(China) Zh Yang	4	3
7	(Netherlands) C Burger	6	6
3	(Slovenia) T Majerič	3	6	6
(Hong Kong) L Zhang	6	1	3
(China) S Xu	4	2
(China) X Han	6	6
(Bulgaria) A Naydenova	6	6
(Japan) C Okadaue	0	2
Q	(Japan) N Fujioka	1	1
5	(Russia) I Khromacheva	6	6

Second round
1	(Serbia) J Jakšić	6	6
(China) Zi Yang	1	2
(China) H Tang	5	1
7	(Netherlands) C Burger	7	6
3	(Slovenia) T Majerič	6	6
(China) X Han	2	3
(Bulgaria) A Naydenova	6	6
5	(Russia) I Khromacheva	4	1

Quarterfinals
1	(Serbia) J Jakšić	6	6
7	(Netherlands) C Burger	3	3
3	(Slovenia) T Majerič	6	6
(Bulgaria) A Naydenova	3	2

Semifinals
1	(Serbia) J Jakšić	7^{7}	7
3	(Slovenia) T Majerič	6^{3}	5

=== Bottom half ===
First round
6	(Russia) M Melnikova	6	6
(Chinese Taipei) W-h Hsu	1	3
WC	(China) Yi Zhang	6	6
Q	(China) Y Wang	3	4
Q	(Japan) R Sawayanagi	6	1	6
(China) A Gai	4	6	1
(Poland) J Jegiołka	0^{r}
4	(China) S Zheng	1
8	(Japan) N Hibino	6	7
(Germany) N Zander	1	5
(Australia) M Adamczak	6	6
(China) Yu Zhang	3	4
(China) D Zhao	6	3	0
Q	(China) L Zhu	4	6	6
(Thailand) V Wongteanchai	4	6	3
2	(Chinese Taipei) S-w Hsieh	6	3	6

Second round
6	(Russia) M Melnikova	3	6	6
WC	(China) Yi Zhang	6	1	1
Q	(Japan) R Sawayanagi	2	2
4	(China) S Zheng	6	6
8	(Japan) N Hibino	6^{3}	1
(Australia) M Adamczak	7^{7}	6
Q	(China) L Zhu	6^{2}	3
2	(Chinese Taipei) S-w Hsieh	7^{7}	6

Quarterfinals
6	(Russia) M Melnikova	3	2
4	(China) S Zheng	6	6
(Australia) M Adamczak	6	6^{2}	6
2	(Chinese Taipei) S-w Hsieh	2	7^{7}	0

Semifinals
4	(China) S Zheng	7^{7}	5	6
(Australia) M Adamczak	6^{5}	7	2
