= 2013 Dunlop World Challenge – Men's singles =

Men's singles
- 2013 Dunlop World Challenge

Final
- Champion: (Australia) Matthew Ebden
- Runner-up: (Japan) Yūichi Sugita
- Score: 6–3, 6–2

Events
Singles	men	women
Doubles	men	women
← 2012 ·	Dunlop World Challenge	· 2014 →

Michał Przysiężny was the defending champion but decided not to participate.

Matthew Ebden won the title, defeating Yūichi Sugita in the final, 6–3, 6–2.

== Seeds ==
1. (Australia) Matthew Ebden (champion)
2. (Japan) Go Soeda (first round)
3. (France) Pierre-Hugues Herbert (second round)
4. (Japan) Yūichi Sugita (final)
5. (Japan) Tatsuma Ito (quarterfinals)
6. (United Kingdom) James Ward (quarterfinals)
7. (Japan) Hiroki Moriya (second round)
8. (Slovenia) Blaž Rola (semifinals)

== Draw ==
=== Key ===
- Q = Qualifier
- WC = Wild card
- LL = Lucky loser
- Alt = Alternate
- SE = Special exempt
- PR = Protected ranking
- ITF = ITF entry
- JE = Junior exempt
- w/o = Walkover
- r = Retired
- d = Defaulted
- SR = Special ranking

=== Finals ===
Semifinals
1	(Australia) Matthew Ebden	6	6
8	(Slovenia) Blaž Rola	4	4
4	(Japan) Yūichi Sugita	6	7^{7}
(Australia) Samuel Groth	4	6^{4}

Final
1	(Australia) Matthew Ebden	6	6
4	(Japan) Yūichi Sugita	3	2

=== Top half ===
First round
1	(Australia) M Ebden	6	7
(Bosnia and Herzegovina) M Bašić	1	5
(United States) C Buchanan	6	3	7
WC	(Japan) Sho Katayama	4	6	5
WC	(Japan) Jumpei Yamasaki	4	2
Q	(Japan) Yuuya Kiba	6	6
SE	(Croatia) B Ćorić	3	4
5	(Japan) T Ito	6	6
3	(France) P-H Herbert	6	6
Q	(New Zealand) A Sitak	3	4
(Australia) M Reid	6^{5}	4
(Australia) B Mitchell	7^{7}	6
(Japan) Y Uchiyama	6	6
(Japan) Shuichi Sekiguchi	3	2
(Chinese Taipei) T Chen	5	7^{7}	6^{4}
8	(Slovenia) B Rola	7	6^{1}	7^{7}

Second round
1	(Australia) M Ebden	7	6
(United States) C Buchanan	5	2
Q	(Japan) Y Kiba	6	3	2
5	(Japan) T Ito	4	6	6
3	(France) P-H Herbert	6^{12}	4
(Australia) B Mitchell	7^{14}	6
(Japan) Y Uchiyama	4	2
8	(Slovenia) B Rola	6	6

Quarterfinals
1	(Australia) M Ebden	7^{7}	6
5	(Japan) T Ito	6^{2}	4
(Australia) B Mitchell	3	6^{6}
8	(Slovenia) B Rola	6	7^{8}

Semifinals
1	(Australia) M Ebden	6	6
8	(Slovenia) B Rola	4	4

=== Bottom half ===
First round
6	(United Kingdom) J Ward	6	6
(Belgium) K Coppejans	3	2
Q	(Thailand) D Udomchoke	6	7
(Japan) H Kondo	2	5
Q	(Japan) Takashi Saito	4	3
(Spain) E López-Pérez	6	6
WC	(Japan) T Suzuki	1	5
4	(Japan) Y Sugita	6	7
7	(Japan) H Moriya	7^{7}	3	6
(Chinese Taipei) Y-h Yang	6^{5}	6	3
(United States) J Jung	7	6
WC	(Japan) Yu Watanuki	5	3
(Australia) S Groth	7^{7}	5	6
(United Kingdom) A Ward	6^{3}	7	2
(Croatia) M Pavić	6	7^{9}
2	(Japan) G Soeda	1	6^{7}

Second round
6	(United Kingdom) J Ward	7	6
Q	(Thailand) D Udomchoke	5	2
(Spain) E López-Pérez	3	3
4	(Japan) Y Sugita	6	6
7	(Japan) H Moriya	6	3	4
(United States) J Jung	3	6	6
(Australia) S Groth	6	6
(Croatia) M Pavić	3	4

Quarterfinals
6	(United Kingdom) J Ward	4	4
4	(Japan) Y Sugita	6	6
(United States) J Jung	7^{8}	6^{1}	4
(Australia) S Groth	6^{6}	7^{7}	6

Semifinals
4	(Japan) Y Sugita	6	7^{7}
(Australia) S Groth	4	6^{4}
