= 2012 ATP China International Tennis Challenge – Anning – Doubles =

Anning – Doubles
- 2012 ATP China International Tennis Challenge – Anning

Final
- Champions: (Thailand) Sanchai Ratiwatana (Thailand) Sonchat Ratiwatana
- Runners-up: (South Africa) Ruan Roelofse (Thailand) Kittipong Wachiramanowong
- Score: 4–6, 7–6^{(7–1)}, [13–11]

Events
Singles	Doubles
ATP China International Tennis Challenge – Anning	· 2013 →

Sanchai Ratiwatana and Sonchat Ratiwatana won the first edition of the tournament 4–6, 7–6^{(7–1)}, [13–11] against Ruan Roelofse and Kittipong Wachiramanowong

== Seeds ==
1. (Thailand) Sanchai Ratiwatana / (Thailand) Sonchat Ratiwatana (champions)
2. (Chinese Taipei) Lee Hsin-han / (Chinese Taipei) Yang Tsung-hua (quarterfinals)
3. (Japan) Hiroki Kondo / (Chinese Taipei) Yi Chu-huan (first round)
4. (Slovenia) Aljaž Bedene / (Slovenia) Grega Žemlja (quarterfinals)

== Draw ==
=== Key ===
- Q = Qualifier
- WC = Wild card
- LL = Lucky loser
- Alt = Alternate
- SE = Special exempt
- PR = Protected ranking
- ITF = ITF entry
- JE = Junior exempt
- w/o = Walkover
- r = Retired
- d = Defaulted
- SR = Special ranking

=== Draw ===
First round
1	(Thailand) Sa Ratiwatana (Thailand) So Ratiwatana	7^{9}	6
(India) Vijayant Malik (Egypt) M Safwat	6^{7}	3
(Monaco) B Balleret (France) P-H Herbert	3	6^{5}
WC	(China) Chang Yu (China) Gao Xin	6	7^{7}
4	(Slovenia) A Bedene (Slovenia) G Žemlja	6	4	[10]
(Australia) A Feeney (Australia) S Groth	2	6	[7]
WC	(China) Li Yucheng (Chinese Taipei) Peng Hsien-yin	4	3
(France) J Ouanna (France) Laurent Rochette	6	6
WC	(China) Ouyang Bowen (China) Wang Chuhan	2	3
(South Africa) R Roelofse (Thailand) K Wachiramanowong	6	6
(China) Gao Peng (China) W Gao	7^{11}	3	[10]
3	(Japan) H Kondo (Chinese Taipei) Yi Chu-huan	6^{9}	6	[5]
(China) Xue Feng (China) Z Zhang	7^{7}	4	[10]
(Japan) Hiroki Moriya (Japan) Y Sugita	6^{4}	6	[7]
(Australia) Matthew Barton (Chinese Taipei) L-c Huang	3	3
2	(Chinese Taipei) H-h Lee (Chinese Taipei) T-h Yang	6	6

Quarterfinals
1	(Thailand) Sa Ratiwatana (Thailand) So Ratiwatana	6	6^{2}	[10]
WC	(China) Chang Yu (China) Gao Xin	2	7^{7}	[7]
4	(Slovenia) A Bedene (Slovenia) G Žemlja	4	6	[5]
(France) J Ouanna (France) Laurent Rochette	6	3	[10]
(South Africa) R Roelofse (Thailand) K Wachiramanowong	7	6
(China) Gao Peng (China) W Gao	5	4
(China) Xue Feng (China) Z Zhang	6	2	[10]
2	(Chinese Taipei) H-h Lee (Chinese Taipei) T-h Yang	4	6	[3]

Semifinals
1	(Thailand) Sa Ratiwatana (Thailand) So Ratiwatana	6	7
(France) J Ouanna (France) Laurent Rochette	3	6^{6}
(South Africa) R Roelofse (Thailand) K Wachiramanowong	6	6
(China) Xue Feng (China) Z Zhang	4	2

Final
1	(Thailand) Sa Ratiwatana (Thailand) So Ratiwatana	4	7^{7}	[13]
(South Africa) R Roelofse (Thailand) K Wachiramanowong	6	6^{1}	[11]
