= 2015 Anning Open – Men's doubles =

Men's doubles
- 2015 Anning Open

Final
- Champions: (China) Bai Yan (China) Wu Di
- Runners-up: (India) Karunuday Singh (Australia) Andrew Whittington
- Score: 6–3, 6–4

Events
Singles	men	women
Doubles	men	women
- Anning Open

Alex Bolt and Andrew Whittington were the defending champions, but Bolt decided not to participate this year. Whittington played alongside Karunuday Singh and lost in the final.

Bai Yan and Wu Di won the title, defeating Whittington and Singh in the final, 6–3, 6–4.

== Seeds ==
1. (India) Divij Sharan / (Netherlands) Boy Westerhof (quarterfinals)
2. (Croatia) Toni Androić / (Croatia) Franko Škugor (quarterfinals)
3. (China) Li Zhe / (South Africa) Ruan Roelofse (first round)
4. (Chinese Taipei) Huang Liang-chi / (Netherlands) Mark Vervoort (quarterfinals)

== Draw ==
Key

- Q = Qualifier
- WC = Wild card
- LL = Lucky loser
- Alt = Alternate
- ITF = ITF entry
- PR = Protected ranking
- SR = Special ranking
- SE = Special exempt
- JE = Junior exempt
- JR = Junior Accelerator Programme entrant
- CO = College Accelerator Programme entrant
- NG = Next Gen Accelerator Program entrant
- w/o = Walkover
- r = Retired
- d = Defaulted

First round
1	(India) D Sharan (Netherlands) B Westerhof	6	3	[18]
(Japan) Takashi Saito (Japan) Yu Watanuki	4	6	[16]
(Japan) Kazuma Kawachi (Japan) K Takeuchi	3	5
(Australia) J Duckworth (Spain) D Pérez Sanz	6	7
3	(China) Z Li (South Africa) R Roelofse	2	7^{8}	[7]
(China) Y Bai (China) D Wu	6	6^{6}	[10]
(Japan) B Sato (Chinese Taipei) T-h Yang	6	7^{9}
WC	(China) X Gao (China) B Ouyang	3	6^{7}
(India) Karunuday Singh (Australia) A Whittington	7^{7}	6
WC	(Australia) M Banes (Australia) Gavin van Peperzeel	6^{5}	2
WC	(China) Wang Ruikai (China) Wang Ruixuan	6^{4}	2
4	(Chinese Taipei) L-c Huang (Netherlands) M Vervoort	7^{7}	6
WC	(South Korea) S-c Hong (South Korea) H-t Lee	7^{10}	3	[3]
(Australia) L Saville (Australia) J Thompson	6^{8}	6	[10]
(Belgium) Alexandre Folie (India) VS Prashanth	4	2
2	(Croatia) T Androić (Croatia) F Škugor	6	6

Quarterfinals
1	(India) D Sharan (Netherlands) B Westerhof	3	6^{4}
(Australia) J Duckworth (Spain) D Pérez Sanz	6	7^{7}
(China) Y Bai (China) D Wu	6	7^{7}
(Japan) B Sato (Chinese Taipei) T-h Yang	2	6^{5}
(India) K Singh (Australia) A Whittington	6	6
4	(Chinese Taipei) L-c Huang (Netherlands) M Vervoort	3	4
(Australia) L Saville (Australia) J Thompson	6	7^{7}
2	(Croatia) T Androić (Croatia) F Škugor	3	6^{3}

Semifinals
(Australia) J Duckworth (Spain) D Pérez Sanz	3	4
(China) Y Bai (China) D Wu	6	6
(India) K Singh (Australia) A Whittington	6	6^{4}	[10]
(Australia) L Saville (Australia) J Thompson	2	7^{7}	[7]

Final
(China) Y Bai (China) D Wu	6	6
(India) K Singh (Australia) A Whittington	3	4
