= 2015 Anning Open – Men's singles =

Men's singles
- 2015 Anning Open

Final
- Champion: (Croatia) Franko Škugor
- Runner-up: (Australia) Gavin van Peperzeel
- Score: 7–5, 6–2

Events
Singles	men	women
Doubles	men	women
← 2014 ·	Anning Open	· 2016 →

Alex Bolt was the defending champion, but he did not participate this year.

Franko Škugor won the title, defeating Gavin van Peperzeel in the final, 7–5, 6–2.

== Seeds ==
1. (Australia) James Duckworth (quarterfinals)
2. (Australia) Luke Saville (first round)
3. (Australia) Jordan Thompson (second round)
4. (Netherlands) Boy Westerhof (first round)
5. (Chinese Taipei) Yang Tsung-hua (semifinals)
6. (Chinese Taipei) Huang Liang-chi (second round)
7. (Croatia) Toni Androić (second round)
8. (Spain) David Pérez Sanz (first round)

== Draw ==
=== Key ===
- Q = Qualifier
- WC = Wild card
- LL = Lucky loser
- Alt = Alternate
- SE = Special exempt
- PR = Protected ranking
- ITF = ITF entry
- JE = Junior exempt
- w/o = Walkover
- r = Retired
- d = Defaulted
- SR = Special ranking

=== Finals ===
Semifinals
(Slovenia) Grega Žemlja	7^{7}	2	2
(Australia) Gavin van Peperzeel	6^{3}	6	6
(Croatia) Franko Škugor	7	3	7
5	(Chinese Taipei) Yang Tsung-hua	5	6	5

Final
(Australia) Gavin van Peperzeel	5	2
(Croatia) Franko Škugor	7	6

=== Top half ===
First round
1	(Australia) J Duckworth	6	6
(China) Z Li	3	4
WC	(China) Ning Yuqing	1	4
(Australia) A Whittington	6	6
WC	(China) Cao Zhaoyi	1	2
(Slovenia) G Žemlja	6	6
(China) C Wang	0	4
6	(Chinese Taipei) L-c Huang	6	6
3	(Australia) J Thompson	6	6
Q	(South Korea) H-t Lee	3	2
(Australia) M Banes	2	4
(China) D Wu	6	6
(Australia) Gavin van Peperzeel	6	6
(Japan) Takashi Saito	3	1
WC	(China) B Ouyang	3	2
7/Q	(Croatia) T Androić	6	6

Second round
1	(Australia) J Duckworth	7^{8}	6
(Australia) A Whittington	6^{6}	4
(Slovenia) G Žemlja	7^{10}	3	6
6	(Chinese Taipei) L-c Huang	6^{8}	6	3
3	(Australia) J Thompson	6	6^{3}	6^{6}
(China) D Wu	3	7^{7}	7^{8}
(Australia) G van Peperzeel	6	6
7/Q	(Croatia) T Androić	3	4

Quarterfinals
1	(Australia) J Duckworth	6^{2}	5
(Slovenia) G Žemlja	7^{7}	7
(China) D Wu	6^{4}	3
(Australia) G van Peperzeel	7^{7}	6

Semifinals
(Slovenia) G Žemlja	7^{7}	2	2
(Australia) G van Peperzeel	6^{3}	6	6

=== Bottom half ===
First round
8	(Spain) D Pérez Sanz	7^{7}	4	4
PR	(India) Karunuday Singh	6^{4}	6	6
(South Korea) D-h Lee	7	4	6
(Japan) K Takeuchi	5	6	1
(South Africa) R Roelofse	7^{7}	6
(Japan) Yu Watanuki	6^{4}	1
(Croatia) F Škugor	6	6
4	(Netherlands) B Westerhof	4	2
5	(Chinese Taipei) T-h Yang	6^{4}	6	6
(India) VS Prashanth	7^{7}	2	4
(Belgium) Alexandre Folie	6	6
Q	(South Korea) S-c Hong	3	2
WC	(China) Zheng Weiqiang	6	5	6^{2}
Q	(India) D Sharan	3	7	7^{7}
(China) Y Bai	6	7^{7}
2	(Australia) L Saville	4	6^{4}

Second round
PR	(India) K Singh	2	6^{5}
(South Korea) D-h Lee	6	7^{7}
(South Africa) R Roelofse	1	1
(Croatia) F Škugor	6	6
5	(Chinese Taipei) T-h Yang	6	6
(Belgium) A Folie	3	3
Q	(India) D Sharan	6	2	3
(China) Y Bai	3	6	6

Quarterfinals
(South Korea) D-h Lee	2	1
(Croatia) F Škugor	6	6
5	(Chinese Taipei) T-h Yang	6	6
(China) Y Bai	4	4

Semifinals
(Croatia) F Škugor	7	3	7
5	(Chinese Taipei) T-h Yang	5	6	5
