= Takuto Niki =

Japanese tennis player (born 1987)

Takuto Niki 仁木 拓人
- Country (sports): Japan
- Born: 12 October 1987 (age 38) Tsukuba, Japan
- Height: 1.82 m (6 ft 0 in)
- Turned pro: April 2010
- Plays: Right-handed (one handed-backhand)
- Prize money: $176,596

Singles
- Career record: 0–1 (at ATP Tour level, Grand Slam level, and in Davis Cup)
- Career titles: 10 ITF
- Highest ranking: No. 278 (23 March 2015)

Doubles
- Career record: 0-0
- Career titles: 26 ITF
- Highest ranking: No. 269 (23 April 2018)

Takuto Niki (仁木 拓人, Niki Takuto; born 12 October 1987) is a Japanese tennis player.

Niki has a career high ATP singles ranking of No. 278 achieved on 23 March 2015 and a career high ATP doubles ranking of No. 269 achieved on 23 April 2018.

Niki made his ATP main draw debut at the 2015 ATP Shenzhen Open where he qualified for the main draw. He lost to Bai Yan in the first round.

He has reached 22 singles finals to date, posting a record of 10 wins and 12 losses. Additionally, he has reached 57 doubles finals, holding a record of 26 wins and 31 losses. All of his career finals in both single and doubles have come on the ITF Futures Tour with the exception of 1, where he and partner Yuichi Ito lost in the final of the ATP Challenger tournament in Granby Canada.

== ATP Challenger and ITF Futures finals ==
=== Singles: 22 (10–12) ===
Legend ATP Challenger (0–0) ITF Futures (10–12)	Finals by surface Hard (8–11) Clay (1–1) Grass (1–0) Carpet (0–0)

Result	W–L	Date	Tournament	Tier	Surface	Opponent	Score
Loss	0–1	May 2011	Kazakhstan F2, Taraz	Futures	Hard	(Italy) Federico Gaio	6–0, 4–6, 2–6
Win	1–1	Jun 2011	Japan F7, Tokyo	Futures	Grass	(Japan) Hiroki Kondo	6–2, 6–4
Loss	1–2	Mar 2012	Japan F2, Tokyo	Futures	Hard	(China) Chang Yu	2–6, 3–6
Loss	1–3	Apr 2013	Israel F7, Ashkelon	Futures	Hard	(France) Enzo Couacoud	5–7, 1–6
Loss	1–4	Mar 2014	Japan F1, Nishitama	Futures	Hard	(China) Wu Di	2–6, 4–6
Win	2–4	Mar 2014	Japan F3, Kofu	Futures	Hard	(Japan) Yusuke Watanuki	6–4, 6–2
Loss	2–5	Apr 2014	Japan F4, Tsukuba	Futures	Hard	(Japan) Masato Shiga	6–3, 6–7^{(4–7)}, 3–6
Win	3–5	Jun 2014	Guam F1, Tumon	Futures	Hard	(India) Jeevan Nedunchezhiyan	6–7^{(6–8)}, 6–2, 7–5
Win	4–5	Jun 2014	Japan F5, Karuizawa	Futures	Clay	(Japan) Yuya Kibi	6–4, 3–6, 6–1
Win	5–5	Mar 2015	Japan F1, Nishitama	Futures	Hard	(Japan) Yuya Kibi	6–3, ret.
Win	6–5	Mar 2015	Japan F2, Tokyo	Futures	Hard	(Japan) Shintaro Imai	6–7^{(4–7)}, 6–4, 6–2
Loss	6–6	Apr 2015	Japan F4, Tsukuba	Futures	Hard	(Japan) Yasutaka Uchiyama	1–6, 2–6
Win	7–6	Oct 2016	Chinese Taipei F1, Kaohsiung	Futures	Hard	(Chinese Taipei) Lee Kuan-Yi	6–4, 6–4
Win	8–6	Oct 2016	Chinese Taipei F2, Kaohsiung	Futures	Hard	(Japan) Jumpei Yamasaki	4–6, 7–5, 6–3
Loss	8–7	Jan 2017	Hong Kong F6	Futures	Hard	(China) Bai Yan	1–6, 4–6
Loss	8–8	Mar 2017	Japan F1. Nishitama	Futures	Hard	(Japan) Yusuke Takahashi	5–7, 3–6
Win	9–8	Mar 2017	Japan F3. Kofu	Futures	Hard	(United States) Shane Vinsant	6–4, 4–0 ret.
Loss	9–9	Apr 2017	Japan F4. Tsukuba	Futures	Hard	(Japan) Yusuke Takahashi	2–6, 2–6
Loss	9–10	May 2018	Singapore F2, Singapore	Futures	Hard	(United States) Collin Altamirano	6–7^{(5–7)}, 3–6
Loss	9–11	Aug 2018	Austria F5, Vogau	Futures	Clay	(Argentina) Matias Zukas	3–6, 3–6
Win	10–11	Sep 2018	USA F26, Fountain Valley	Futures	Hard	(United States) Michael Shabaz	6–3, 3–6, 6–3
Loss	10–12	Apr 2019	M25 Matsuyama, Japan	World Tennis Tour	Hard	(Japan) Shuichi Sekiguchi	4–6, 4–6

=== Doubles: 57 (26–31) ===
Legend ATP Challenger (0–1) ITF Futures (26–30)	Finals by surface Hard (23–24) Clay (3–7) Grass (0–0) Carpet (0–0)

Result	W–L	Date	Tournament	Tier	Surface	Partner	Opponents	Score
Loss	0–1	Jun 2010	Japan F5, Karuizawa	Futures	Clay	(Japan) Fumiaki Kita	(South Korea) Lee Chui-Hee (South Korea) Kwon Oh-Hee	5–7, 3–6
Win	1–1	May 2011	Kazakhstan F3, Almaty	Futures	Hard	(Japan) Arata Onozawa	(Russia) Mikhail Fufygin (Russia) Ilia Starkov	1–6, 7–5, [10–7]
Loss	1–2	Jun 2011	India F7, Delhi	Futures	Hard	(Russia) Vitali Reshetnikov	(India) Divij Sharan (India) Rohan Gajjar	2–6, 6–7^{(7–9)}
Loss	1–3	Sep 2011	Serbia F11, Nis	Futures	Clay	(Russia) Stepan Khotulev	(France) Gleb Sakharov (Russia) Mikhail Vasiliev	2–6, 6–2, [7-10]
Win	2–3	Sep 2011	Serbia F12, Soko Banja	Futures	Clay	(Russia) Stepan Khotulev	(North Macedonia) Tomislav Jotovski (North Macedonia) Stefan Micov	7–5, 6–3
Loss	2–4	Nov 2011	Chinese Taipei F4, Tainan	Futures	Clay	(Japan) Arata Onozawa	(Chinese Taipei) Huang Liang-Chi (Chinese Taipei) Yi Chu-Huan	3–6, 4–6
Win	3–4	Mar 2012	Japan F2, Tokyo	Futures	Hard	(Japan) Arata Onozawa	(China) Gao Xin (China) Chang Yu	3–6, 6–1, [10-6]
Loss	3–5	May 2012	China F8, Fuzhou	Futures	Hard	(Japan) Arata Onozawa	(China) Gao Xin (China) Li Zhe	2–6, 3–6
Win	4–5	Jun 2012	Japan F5, Karuizawa	Futures	Clay	(Japan) Shota Tagawa	(Japan) Gengo Kikuchi (Japan) Yuki Matsuo	6–4, 6–4
Win	5–5	Jul 2012	Japan F7, Sapporo	Futures	Clay	(Japan) Arata Onozawa	(Japan) Yasutaka Uchiyama (Japan) Shota Tagawa	7–6^{(7–3)}, 6–2
Loss	5–6	Jul 2012	Granby, Canada	Challenger	Hard	(Japan) Yuichi Ito	(Canada) Vasek Pospisil (Canada) Philip Bester	1–6, 2–6
Loss	5–7	May 2013	Israel F8, Ashkelon	Futures	Hard	(Japan) Arata Onozawa	(Republic of Ireland) Sam Barry (New Zealand) Sebastian Lavie	6–7^{(7–9)}, 6–2, [10–12]
Win	6–7	May 2013	Israel F9, Ramat Hasharon	Futures	Hard	(Japan) Arata Onozawa	(Republic of Ireland) Sam Barry (Republic of Ireland) Daniel Glancy	6–3, 6–4
Loss	6–8	May 2013	Thailand F1, Bangkok	Futures	Hard	(Japan) Arata Onozawa	(Thailand) Sonchat Ratiwatana (Thailand) Sanchai Ratiwatana	7–6^{(8–6)}, 2–6, [7–10]
Loss	6–9	Jun 2013	Guam F1, Tumon	Futures	Hard	(Japan) Yuichi Ito	(Japan) Bumpei Sato (Japan) Yasutaka Uchiyama	6–7^{(2–7)}, 4–6
Win	7–9	Sep 2013	Chinese Taipei F2, Taipei City	Futures	Hard	(Japan) Arata Onozawa	(Chinese Taipei) Hsieh Cheng-peng (Chinese Taipei) Chen I-Ta	6–4, 6–4
Win	8–9	Dec 2013	Cambodia F2, Phnom Penh	Futures	Hard	(Japan) Arata Onozawa	(Japan) Toshihide Matsui (Thailand) Danai Udomchoke	7–6^{(12–10)}, 7–6^{(10–8)}
Loss	8–10	Dec 2013	Cambodia F3, Phnom Penh	Futures	Hard	(Japan) Arata Onozawa	(India) Karunuday Singh (India) Ramkumar Ramanathan	4–6, 3–6
Loss	8–11	Feb 2014	Australia F1, Happy Valley	Futures	Hard	(Japan) Yasutaka Uchiyama	(New Zealand) Marcus Daniell (Australia) Dane Propoggia	3–6, 2–6
Win	9–11	Mar 2014	Japan F3, Kofu	Futures	Hard	(Japan) Arata Onozawa	(Japan) Toshihide Matsui (Thailand) Danai Udomchoke	6–4, 6–2
Win	10–11	Jun 2014	Guam F1, Tumon	Futures	Hard	(Japan) Bumpei Sato	(Japan) Yuya Kibi (Japan) Tomohiro Masabayashi	6–1, 6–3
Loss	10–12	Jun 2014	Japan F6, Kashiwa	Futures	Hard	(Japan) Arata Onozawa	(Japan) Yusuke Watanuki (Japan) Keisuke Watanuki	6–7^{(4–7)}, 6–4, [7–10]
Loss	10–13	Jun 2014	Japan F8, Sapporo	Futures	Clay	(Japan) Arata Onozawa	(Japan) Takao Suzuki (Japan) Yasutaka Uchiyama	2–6, 6–7^{(4–7)}
Win	11–13	Oct 2014	Australia F7, Cairns	Futures	Hard	(Japan) Yuya Kibi	(Australia) Dane Propoggia (United Kingdom) Brydan Klein	1–6, 7–6^{(7–2)}, [10–4]
Win	12–13	Mar 2015	Japan F1, Nishitama	Futures	Hard	(Japan) Yuya Kibi	(Japan) Yuichi Ito (Japan) Arata Onozawa	6–3, 3–6, [11–9]
Win	13–13	Apr 2015	Japan F4, Tsukuba	Futures	Hard	(Japan) Shintaro Imai	(Australia) Jarryd Chaplin (New Zealand) Ben McLachlan	6–2, 6–4
Win	14–13	Jun 2015	Japan F6, Kashiwa	Futures	Hard	(Japan) Yuya Kibi	(South Korea) Lee Duckhee (South Korea) Woo Chung Hyo	6–0, 6–3
Win	15–13	Mar 2016	Japan F3, Kofu	Futures	Hard	(Japan) Shintaro Imai	(Japan) Yuya Kibi (Japan) Toshihide Matsui	6–1, 6–2
Loss	15–14	Apr 2016	Japan F5, Kashiwa	Futures	Hard	(Japan) Shintaro Imai	(Japan) Yuichi Ito (Japan) Sho Katayama	3–6, 3–6
Loss	15–15	Jul 2016	Korea F4, Gimcheon	Futures	Hard	(Japan) Shintaro Imai	(South Korea) Nam Ji Sung (South Korea) Song Min-Kyu	4–6, 4–6
Win	16–15	Jan 2017	Hong Kong F6	Futures	Hard	(France) Geoffrey Blancaneaux	(Hong Kong) Karan Rastogi (Hong Kong) Wong Chun Hun	7–6^{(8–6)}, 6–0
Loss	16–16	Mar 2017	Japan F1, Nishitama	Futures	Hard	(Japan) Kaito Uesugi	(Japan) Katsuki Nagao (Japan) Hiromasa Oku	0–6, 6–7^{(2–7)}
Win	17–16	Mar 2017	Japan F2, Tokyo	Futures	Hard	(Japan) Kaito Uesugi	(Japan) Gengo Kikuchi (Japan) Shunrou Takeshima	7–6^{(7–5)}, 6–7^{(2–7)}, [10–3]
Win	18–16	Apr 2017	Japan F5, Kashiwa	Futures	Hard	(Japan) Shintaro Imai	(Japan) Katsuki Nagao (Japan) Hiromasa Oku	6–4, 6–4
Loss	18–17	Jun 2017	Japan F6, Karuizawa	Futures	Clay	(Japan) Shintaro Imai	(Japan) Toshihide Matsui (Indonesia) Christopher Rungkat	5–7, 2–6
Win	19–17	Jun 2017	Chinese Taipei F1, Taipei	Futures	Hard	(Japan) Shintaro Imai	(Chinese Taipei) Lee Kuan-Yi (Chinese Taipei) Liu Shao-Fan	7–5, 6–4
Loss	19–18	Jun 2017	Chinese Taipei F2, Taipei	Futures	Hard	(Japan) Shintaro Imai	(Chinese Taipei) Yi Chu-Huan (Chinese Taipei) Chiu Yu-Hsiang	6–2, 6–7^{(5–7)}, [8–10]
Win	20–18	Jul 2017	Hong Kong F3	Futures	Hard	(Japan) Shintaro Imai	(Hong Kong) Wong Hong Kit (Hong Kong) Yeung Pak Long	7–5, 6–2
Loss	20–19	Dec 2017	Hong Kong F5	Futures	Hard	(France) Corentin Denolly	(United States) Evan King (United States) Michael Zhu	4–6, 2–6
Loss	20–20	Jan 2018	Hong Kong F6	Futures	Hard	(Japan) Shintaro Imai	(Japan) Yuto Sakai (Japan) Yunosuke Tanaka	6–2, 3–6, [4–10]
Win	21–20	Mar 2018	Japan F1, Nishitama	Futures	Hard	(Japan) Shintaro Imai	(Japan) Soichiro Moritani (Japan) Sho Katayama	6–1, 6–4
Win	22–20	Mar 2018	Japan F2, Tokyo	Futures	Hard	(Japan) Shintaro Imai	(South Korea) Lee Tae-Woo (South Korea) Lim Yong-kyu	7–5, 6–3
Win	23–20	Apr 2018	Japan F6, Matsuyama	Futures	Hard	(Japan) Shintaro Imai	(Japan) Yuto Sakai (Japan) Yuhel Kono	6–4, 6–3
Loss	23–21	May 2018	Singapore F2, Singapore	Futures	Hard	(Japan) Shintaro Imai	(Philippines) Francis Casey Alcantara (United States) Collin Altamirano	1–6, 4–6
Loss	23–22	Jun 2018	Korea F2, Gyeongsan	Futures	Hard	(United States) John-Paul Fruttero	(South Korea) Nam Ji Sung (South Korea) Lim Yong-kyu	4–6, 1–6
Loss	23–23	Aug 2018	Austria F5, Vogau	Futures	Clay	(Japan) Yuta Shimizu	(Argentina) Alejo Vilaro (Argentina) Matias Zukas	3–6, 6–3, [4–10]
Loss	23–24	Aug 2018	Netherlands F4, Oldenzaal	Futures	Clay	(Japan) Kazuki Nishiwaki	(Netherlands) Niels Lootsma (Netherlands) Glenn Smits	6–3, 5–7, [6–10]
Loss	23–25	Sep 2018	Canada F7, Toronto	Futures	Hard	(United States) Felix Corwin	(Italy) Francesco Ferrari (Greece) Michail Pervolarakis	3–6, 3–6
Win	24–25	Mar 2019	M15 Nishitama, Japan	World Tennis Tour	Hard	(Japan) Shintaro Imai	(Thailand) Wishaya Trongcharoenchaikul (Australia) Blake Ellis	1–6, 7–6^{(10–8)}, [10–5]
Loss	24–26	Mar 2019	M15 Tokyo, Japan	World Tennis Tour	Hard	(Japan) Shintaro Imai	(South Korea) Nam Ji Sung (South Korea) Song Min-Kyu	6–4, 6–7^{(4–7)}, [7–10]
Loss	24–27	Jun 2019	M15 Daegu, South Korea	World Tennis Tour	Hard	(Japan) Issei Okamura	(South Korea) Lim Yong-kyu (South Korea) Song Min-Kyu	3–6, 5–7
Loss	24–28	Aug 2019	M15 Kiryat Shmona, Israel	World Tennis Tour	Hard	(Ukraine) Marat Deviatiarov	(Italy) Federico Bertuccioli (Italy) Andrea Picchione	6–4, 4–6, [12–14]
Loss	24–29	Mar 2021	M15 Sharm El Sheikh, Egypt	World Tennis Tour	Hard	(Japan) Yusuke Takahashi	(Italy) Jacopo Berrettini (Austria) Neil Oberleitner	3–6, 3–6
Win	25–29	Jun 2021	M15 Heraklion, Greece	World Tennis Tour	Hard	(Japan) Yuki Mochizuki	(China) Runhao Hua (China) Ze Zhang	6–3, 6–4
Loss	25–30	Jul 2021	M25 Idanha-a-Nova, Portugal	World Tennis Tour	Hard	(Japan) Kaito Uesugi	(Australia) Thomas Fancutt (United Kingdom) Evan Hoyt	3–6, 2–6
Loss	25–31	Apr 2022	M15 Chiang Rai, Thailand	World Tennis Tour	Hard	(Japan) Shinji Hazawa	(South Korea) Ji Sung Nam (South Korea) Min Kyu Song	1–6, 4–6
Win	26–31	Jun 2022	M25 Harmon, Guam	World Tennis Tour	Hard	(Japan) Takeru Yuzuki	(South Korea) Seong Chan Hong (South Korea) Cheong-Eui Kim	1–6, 7–6^{(7–4)} [11–9]
