= 2013 Dunlop World Challenge – Women's doubles =

Women's doubles
- 2013 Dunlop World Challenge

Final
- Champions: (Japan) Shuko Aoyama (Japan) Misaki Doi
- Runners-up: (Japan) Eri Hozumi (Japan) Makoto Ninomiya
- Score: 7–6^{(7–1)}, 2–6, [11–9]

Events
Singles	men	women
Doubles	men	women
← 2012 ·	Dunlop World Challenge	· 2014 →

Ashleigh Barty and Casey Dellacqua were the defending champions, having won the event in 2012, but both players decided not to compete in 2013.

Shuko Aoyama and Misaki Doi won the tournament, defeating Eri Hozumi and Makoto Ninomiya in the all-Japanese final, 7–6^{(7–1)}, 2–6, [11–9].

== Seeds ==
1. (Japan) Shuko Aoyama / (Japan) Misaki Doi (champions)
2. (Thailand) Luksika Kumkhum / (Thailand) Tamarine Tanasugarn (semifinals)
3. (Thailand) Nicha Lertpitaksinchai / (Thailand) Peangtarn Plipuech (first round)
4. (Japan) Eri Hozumi / (Japan) Makoto Ninomiya (final)

== Draw ==
=== Key ===
- Q = Qualifier
- WC = Wild card
- LL = Lucky loser
- Alt = Alternate
- SE = Special exempt
- PR = Protected ranking
- ITF = ITF entry
- JE = Junior exempt
- w/o = Walkover
- r = Retired
- d = Defaulted
- SR = Special ranking

First round
1	(Japan) S Aoyama (Japan) M Doi	6	6
(South Korea) S-j Jang (South Korea) S-r Lee	2	3
WC	(Japan) Y Koshino (Japan) K Onishi	3	2
(South Korea) N-l Han (South Korea) M Yoo	6	6
3	(Thailand) N Lertpitaksinchai (Thailand) Pe Plipuech	6^{2}	4
(Switzerland) B Bencic (Thailand) N Lertcheewakarn	7^{7}	6
(Japan) M Eguchi (Japan) R Sawayanagi	6	6
(Russia) K Lykina (Japan) Y Tanaka	2	2
WC	(Japan) H Kaji (Japan) H Yamamoto	5	2
(Japan) J Namigata (Japan) M Tanaka	7	6
(Japan) K Hisami (Japan) S Ishizu	5	6^{8}
4	(Japan) E Hozumi (Japan) M Ninomiya	7	7^{10}
(Japan) N Hibino (Japan) M Kato	7^{7}	3	[10]
(Japan) R Fujiwara (Japan) A Omae	6^{3}	6	[8]
WC	(Japan) M Imanishi (Japan) M Inoue	2	3
2	(Thailand) L Kumkhum (Thailand) T Tanasugarn	6	6

Quarterfinals
1	(Japan) S Aoyama (Japan) M Doi	6	7^{7}
(South Korea) N-l Han (South Korea) M Yoo	1	6^{3}
(Switzerland) B Bencic (Thailand) N Lertcheewakarn	1	6	[3]
(Japan) M Eguchi (Japan) R Sawayanagi	6	3	[10]
(Japan) J Namigata (Japan) M Tanaka	5	5
4	(Japan) E Hozumi (Japan) M Ninomiya	7	7
(Japan) N Hibino (Japan) M Kato	5	4
2	(Thailand) L Kumkhum (Thailand) T Tanasugarn	7	6

Semifinals
1	(Japan) S Aoyama (Japan) M Doi	6	6
(Japan) M Eguchi (Japan) R Sawayanagi	4	2
4	(Japan) E Hozumi (Japan) M Ninomiya	7	6
2	(Thailand) L Kumkhum (Thailand) T Tanasugarn	5	3

Final
1	(Japan) S Aoyama (Japan) M Doi	7^{7}	2	[11]
4	(Japan) E Hozumi (Japan) M Ninomiya	6^{1}	6	[9]
