= 2013 Dunlop World Challenge – Women's singles =

Women's singles
- 2013 Dunlop World Challenge

Final
- Champion: (Thailand) Luksika Kumkhum
- Runner-up: (Japan) Hiroko Kuwata
- Score: 3–6, 6–1, 6–3

Events
Singles	men	women
Doubles	men	women
← 2012 ·	Dunlop World Challenge	· 2014 →

Stefanie Vögele was the defending champion, having won the event in 2012, but decided not to participate in 2013.

Luksika Kumkhum won the tournament, defeating Hiroko Kuwata in the final, 3–6, 6–1, 6–3.

== Seeds ==
1. (Japan) Kurumi Nara (quarterfinals; withdrew)
2. (Japan) Misaki Doi (quarterfinals)
3. (Thailand) Luksika Kumkhum (champion)
4. (Kazakhstan) Zarina Diyas (first round; retired)
5. (Japan) Sachie Ishizu (first round)
6. (Switzerland) Belinda Bencic (semifinals)
7. (China) Wang Qiang (second round)
8. (Japan) Eri Hozumi (quarterfinals)

== Main draw ==
=== Key ===
- Q = Qualifier
- WC = Wild card
- LL = Lucky loser
- Alt = Alternate
- SE = Special exempt
- PR = Protected ranking
- ITF = ITF entry
- JE = Junior exempt
- w/o = Walkover
- r = Retired
- d = Defaulted
- SR = Special ranking

=== Finals ===
Semifinals
Q	(Japan) Hiroko Kuwata	6^{4}	6	6
(Thailand) Noppawan Lertcheewakarn	7^{7}	2	3
3	(Thailand) Luksika Kumkhum	6	6
6	(Switzerland) Belinda Bencic	4	4

Final
Q	(Japan) Hiroko Kuwata	6	1	3
3	(Thailand) Luksika Kumkhum	3	6	6

=== Top half ===
First round
1	(Japan) K Nara	6	6
(Thailand) N Luangnam	3	3
Q	(Japan) K Hisami	1	6	4
(Australia) S Sanders	6	1	6
WC	(Japan) M Ninomiya	7	7^{7}
(Japan) M Inoue	5	6^{2}
Q	(Japan) H Kuwata	6	6
5	(Japan) S Ishizu	3	3
4	(Kazakhstan) Z Diyas	6	2^{r}
WC	(Japan) H Kaji	2	6
(Thailand) N Lertcheewakarn	6	6
Q	(Japan) A Yonemura	3	4
(Japan) J Namigata	6	6
(Thailand) P Plipuech	3	1
(Thailand) T Tanasugarn	6^{2}	5
8	(Japan) E Hozumi	7^{7}	7

Second round
1	(Japan) K Nara	6	6
(Australia) S Sanders	3	4
WC	(Japan) M Ninomiya	3	5
Q	(Japan) H Kuwata	6	7
WC	(Japan) H Kaji	5	2
(Thailand) N Lertcheewakarn	7	6
(Japan) J Namigata	4	4
8	(Japan) E Hozumi	6	6

Quarterfinals
1	(Japan) K Nara
Q	(Japan) H Kuwata	w/o
(Thailand) N Lertcheewakarn	3	6	6
8	(Japan) E Hozumi	6	4	2

Semifinals
Q	(Japan) H Kuwata	6^{4}	6	6
(Thailand) N Lertcheewakarn	7^{7}	2	3

=== Bottom half ===
First round
7	(China) Q Wang	7	6
WC	(Japan) Y Tanaka	5	0
Q	(Japan) E Mutaguchi	4	6^{1}
(Japan) M Imanishi	6	7^{7}
WC	(Japan) M Kato	7	6
(Japan) M Tanaka	5	3
(Japan) N Hibino	1	4
3	(Thailand) L Kumkhum	6	6
6	(Switzerland) B Bencic	6	6
(South Korea) S-j Jang	0	2
(Russia) K Lykina	2	6	6
(South Korea) S-r Lee	6	3	4
(Japan) S Aoyama	4	6^{2}
(Japan) M Eguchi	6	7^{7}
(South Korea) M Yoo	4	1
2	(Japan) M Doi	6	6

Second round
7	(China) Q Wang	5	4
(Japan) M Imanishi	7	6
WC	(Japan) M Kato	1	2
3	(Thailand) L Kumkhum	6	6
6	(Switzerland) B Bencic	6	6
(Russia) K Lykina	2	4
(Japan) M Eguchi	3	4
2	(Japan) M Doi	6	6

Quarterfinals
(Japan) M Imanishi	2	1
3	(Thailand) L Kumkhum	6	6
6	(Switzerland) B Bencic	6	6
2	(Japan) M Doi	4	4

Semifinals
3	(Thailand) L Kumkhum	6	6
6	(Switzerland) B Bencic	4	4
