= 2015 Anning Open – Women's doubles =

Women's doubles
- 2015 Anning Open

Final
- Champions: (China) Xu Yifan (China) Zheng Saisai
- Runners-up: (China) Yang Zhaoxuan (China) Ye Qiuyu
- Score: 7–5, 6–2

Events
Singles	men	women
Doubles	men	women
← 2014 ·	Anning Open	· 2016 →

Han Xinyun and Zhang Kailin were the defending champions, but lost in the semifinals.

The top seeds Xu Yifan and Zheng Saisai won the title, defeating Yang Zhaoxuan and Ye Qiuyu in an all-Chinese final, 7–5, 6–2.

== Seeds ==
1. (China) Xu Yifan / (China) Zheng Saisai (champions)
2. (China) Han Xinyun / (China) Zhang Kailin (semifinals)
3. (China) Liu Chang / (China) Lu Jiajing (quarterfinals)
4. (China) Yang Zhaoxuan / (China) Ye Qiuyu (final)

== Draw ==
=== Key ===
- Q = Qualifier
- WC = Wild card
- LL = Lucky loser
- Alt = Alternate
- SE = Special exempt
- PR = Protected ranking
- ITF = ITF entry
- JE = Junior exempt
- w/o = Walkover
- r = Retired
- d = Defaulted
- SR = Special ranking

First round
1	(China) Y Xu (China) S Zheng	6	6
(China) A Gai (China) F Xun	4	2
(Russia) V Ivakhnenko (Uzbekistan) S Sharipova	5	6	[8]
(Australia) A Bai (Japan) H Kuwata	7	4	[10]
3	(China) C Liu (China) J Lu	6	6
(China) X Gao (Bulgaria) A Naydenova	2	4
(United States) L Embree (United States) A Guarachi	6	6
WC	(China) Y Wu (China) M Yi	0	3
WC	(China) X Sun (China) Yuk Zhang	4	2
WC	(China) Yan Wang (China) Yi Zhang	6	6
(United States) D Lao (India) A Raina	3	5
4	(China) Z Yang (China) Q Ye	6	7
(India) N Chilumula (South Africa) C Simmonds	6	3	[4]
(China) X You (China) A Zhu	4	6	[10]
(China) J Chen (Hong Kong) L Zhang	0	5
2	(China) X Han (China) K Zhang	6	7

Quarterfinals
1	(China) Y Xu (China) S Zheng	6	6
(Australia) A Bai (Japan) H Kuwata	2	2
3	(China) C Liu (China) J Lu	1	2
(United States) L Embree (United States) A Guarachi	6	6
WC	(China) Yan Wang (China) Yi Zhang	4	4
4	(China) Z Yang (China) Q Ye	6	6
(China) X You (China) A Zhu	2	2
2	(China) X Han (China) K Zhang	6	6

Semifinals
1	(China) Y Xu (China) S Zheng	4	6	[10]
(United States) L Embree (United States) A Guarachi	6	4	[7]
4	(China) Z Yang (China) Q Ye	6	6
2	(China) X Han (China) K Zhang	4	1

Final
1	(China) Y Xu (China) S Zheng	7	6
4	(China) Z Yang (China) Q Ye	5	2
