= 2015 Anning Open =

- Date: 27 April–3 May (ATP); 4–10 May (ITF)
- Edition: 4th (ATP); 2nd (ITF)
- Category: ATP Challenger Tour; ITF Women's Circuit
- Prize money: $50,000+H (ATP) $75,000 (ITF)
- Surface: Clay
- Location: Anning, China

Champions

Men's singles
- (Croatia) Franko Škugor

Women's singles
- (China) Zheng Saisai

Men's doubles
- (China) Bai Yan / (China) Wu Di

Women's doubles
- (China) Xu Yifan / (China) Zheng Saisai
← 2014 ·	Anning Open	· 2016 →

The 2015 Anning Open was a professional tennis tournament played on outdoor clay courts. It was the fourth edition for men and second edition for women of the tournament and part of the 2015 ATP Challenger Tour and the 2015 ITF Women's Circuit, offering a total of $50,000+H for men $75,000 women in prize money. It took place in Anning, China, on 27 April – 3 May for men and 4–10 May 2015 for women.

== Men's singles main draw entrants ==
=== Seeds ===
Country	Player	Rank^{1}	Seed
AUS	James Duckworth	92	1
AUS	Luke Saville	194	2
AUS	Jordan Thompson	208	3
NED	Boy Westerhof	209	4
TPE	Yang Tsung-hua	271	5
TPE	Huang Liang-chi	296	6
CRO	Toni Androić	334	7
ESP	David Pérez Sanz	344	8

- ^{1} Rankings as of 27 April 2015

=== Other entrants ===
The following players received wildcards into the singles main draw:

- (China) Zheng Wei Qiang
- (China) Ouyang Bowen
- (China) Cao Zhaoyi
- (China) Ning Yuqing

The following players received entry from the qualifying draw:

- (South Korea) Lee Hyung-taik
- (South Korea) Hong Seong-chan
- (Croatia) Toni Androić
- (India) Divij Sharan

The following player received entry from a protected ranking:

- (India) Karunuday Singh

== Women's singles main draw entrants ==
=== Seeds ===
Country	Player	Rank^{1}	Seed
CHN	Zheng Saisai	75	1
CHN	Wang Qiang	96	2
CHN	Duan Yingying	125	3
CHN	Wang Yafan	150	4
CHN	Liu Fangzhou	151	5
CHN	Xu Yifan	153	6
CHN	Zhang Kailin	155	7
JPN	Hiroko Kuwata	168	8

- ^{1} Rankings as of 27 April 2015

=== Other entrants ===
The following players received wildcards into the singles main draw:

- (China) Sun Xuliu
- (China) Wu Yunjun
- (China) Ye Qiuyu
- (China) Zhao Di

The following players received entry from the qualifying draw:

- (China) Gai Ao
- (China) Gao Xinyu
- (United States) Alexa Guarachi
- (China) You Xiaodi

== Champions ==
=== Men's singles ===
- (Croatia) Franko Škugor def. (Australia) Gavin van Peperzeel, 7–5, 6–2

=== Women's singles ===
- (China) Zheng Saisai def. (China) Han Xinyun, 6–4, 3–6, 6–4

=== Men's doubles ===
- (China) Bai Yan / (China) Wu Di def. (India) Karunuday Singh / (Australia) Andrew Whittington, 6–3, 6–4

=== Women's doubles ===
- (China) Xu Yifan / (China) Zheng Saisai def. (China) Yang Zhaoxuan / (China) Ye Qiuyu, 7–5, 6–2
