= 2015 Anning Open – Women's singles =

Women's singles
- 2015 Anning Open

Final
- Champion: (China) Zheng Saisai
- Runner-up: (China) Han Xinyun
- Score: 6–4, 3–6, 6–4

Events
Singles	men	women
Doubles	men	women
← 2014 ·	Anning Open	· 2016 →

Zheng Saisai was the defending champion, and defended her title defeating Han Xinyun in an all-Chinese final, 6–4, 3–6, 6–4.

== Seeds ==
1. (China) Zheng Saisai (champion)
2. (China) Wang Qiang (quarterfinals)
3. (China) Duan Yingying (first round)
4. (China) Wang Yafan (semifinals)
5. (China) Liu Fangzhou (first round)
6. (China) Xu Yifan (first round; ret.)
7. (China) Zhang Kailin (second round)
8. (Japan) Hiroko Kuwata (first round)

== Main draw ==
=== Key ===
- Q = Qualifier
- WC = Wild card
- LL = Lucky loser
- Alt = Alternate
- SE = Special exempt
- PR = Protected ranking
- ITF = ITF entry
- JE = Junior exempt
- w/o = Walkover
- r = Retired
- d = Defaulted
- SR = Special ranking

=== Finals ===
Semifinals
1	(China) Zheng Saisai	6	3	6
4	(China) Wang Yafan	3	6	4
(China) Yang Zhaoxuan	5	6^{4}
(China) Han Xinyun	7	7^{7}

Final
1	(China) Zheng Saisai	6	3	6
(China) Han Xinyun	4	6	4

=== Top half ===
First round
1	(China) S Zheng	6	6
Q	(China) X You	1	4
Q	(United States) A Guarachi	1	4
(India) A Raina	6	6
(China) Yux Zhang	4	2
(Bulgaria) A Naydenova	6	6
WC	(China) D Zhao	6	4	6
8	(Japan) H Kuwata	0	6	4
4	(China) Yaf Wang	6	6
(China) F Xun	2	0
(Hong Kong) L Zhang	6	6
WC	(China) Y Wu	3	2
Q	(China) A Gai	0^{r}
(United States) L Embree	3
WC	(China) Q Ye	7	3
6	(China) Y Xu	5	0^{r}

Second round
1	(China) S Zheng	6	6
(India) A Raina	1	2
(Bulgaria) A Naydenova	7^{7}	6
WC	(China) D Zhao	6^{3}	1
4	(China) Yaf Wang	6	6
(Hong Kong) L Zhang	3	2
(United States) L Embree	6	6
WC	(China) Q Ye	2	0

Quarterfinals
1	(China) S Zheng	6	6
(Bulgaria) A Naydenova	2	4
4	(China) Yaf Wang	6	6
(United States) L Embree	3	3

Semifinals
1	(China) S Zheng	6	3	6
4	(China) Yaf Wang	3	6	4

=== Bottom half ===
First round
7	(China) K Zhang	6	3	6
(Uzbekistan) S Sharipova	3	6	2
(South Africa) C Simmonds	6	6
(China) Yan Wang	4	3
WC	(China) X Sun	6	6
(Australia) A Bai	3	3
(China) Z Yang	6	6
3	(China) Y Duan	3	3
5	(China) F Liu	3	3
(China) X Han	6	6
(China) J Lu	6	6
(China) C Liu	3	3
(Belgium) K Liebens	3	6	3
Q	(China) X Gao	6	3	6
(Russia) V Ivakhnenko	4	0
2	(China) Q Wang	6	6

Second round
7	(China) K Zhang	4	0
(South Africa) C Simmonds	6	6
WC	(China) X Sun	1	1
(China) Z Yang	6	6
(China) X Han	4	6	6
(China) J Lu	6	1	3
Q	(China) X Gao	6^{1}	1
2	(China) Q Wang	7^{7}	6

Quarterfinals
(South Africa) C Simmonds	1	4
(China) Z Yang	6	6
(China) X Han	6	6
2	(China) Q Wang	3	2

Semifinals
(China) Z Yang	5	6^{4}
(China) X Han	7	7^{7}
