= 2014 Dunlop World Challenge – Women's singles =

Women's singles
- 2014 Dunlop World Challenge

Final
- Champion: (Belgium) An-Sophie Mestach
- Runner-up: (Japan) Shuko Aoyama
- Score: 6–1, 6–1

Events
Singles	men	women
Doubles	men	women
← 2013 ·	Dunlop World Challenge	· 2015 →

Luksika Kumkhum was the defending champion, but lost in the quarterfinals to countrywoman Tamarine Tanasugarn.

An-Sophie Mestach won the title, defeating Shuko Aoyama in the final, 6–1, 6–1.

== Seeds ==
1. (Thailand) Luksika Kumkhum (quarterfinals)
2. (Japan) Kimiko Date-Krumm (semifinals; retired)
3. (Japan) Misaki Doi (quarterfinals)
4. (Belgium) An-Sophie Mestach (champion)
5. (Japan) Misa Eguchi (first round)
6. (Japan) Eri Hozumi (first round)
7. (Japan) Hiroko Kuwata (first round)
8. (China) Xu Yifan (second round)

== Main draw ==
=== Key ===
- Q = Qualifier
- WC = Wild card
- LL = Lucky loser
- Alt = Alternate
- SE = Special exempt
- PR = Protected ranking
- ITF = ITF entry
- JE = Junior exempt
- w/o = Walkover
- r = Retired
- d = Defaulted
- SR = Special ranking

=== Finals ===
Semifinals
(Thailand) Tamarine Tanasugarn	1	4
(Japan) Shuko Aoyama	6	6
4	(Belgium) An-Sophie Mestach	6	0
2	(Japan) Kimiko Date-Krumm	2	0^{r}

Final
(Japan) Shuko Aoyama	1	1
4	(Belgium) An-Sophie Mestach	6	6

=== Top half ===
First round
1	(Thailand) L Kumkhum	6	6
WC	(Russia) K Lykina	3	0
LL	(Japan) Y Higuchi	4	6	2
Q	(Japan) A Okuno	6	4	6
(Thailand) T Tanasugarn	6	6
(Japan) J Namigata	2	3
PR	(Chinese Taipei) K-c Chang	7^{7}	2	6
5	(Japan) M Eguchi	6^{2}	6	3
3	(Japan) M Doi	7^{7}	7^{7}
Q	(Japan) K Hisami	6^{4}	6^{3}
WC	(Japan) M Tanaka	2	4
WC	(Japan) M Kato	6	6
(South Korea) N-l Han	3	4
(Japan) S Aoyama	6	6
(South Korea) S-j Jang	4	1
8	(China) Y Xu	6	6

Second round
1	(Thailand) L Kumkhum	6	6
Q	(Japan) A Okuno	2	2
(Thailand) T Tanasugarn	6	1	6
PR	(Chinese Taipei) K-c Chang	2	6	4
3	(Japan) M Doi	6	6
WC	(Japan) M Kato	1	4
(Japan) S Aoyama	5	6	6
8	(China) Y Xu	7	4	1

Quarterfinals
1	(Thailand) L Kumkhum	4	6	4
(Thailand) T Tanasugarn	6	3	6
3	(Japan) M Doi	4	3
(Japan) S Aoyama	6	6

Semifinals
(Thailand) T Tanasugarn	1	4
(Japan) S Aoyama	6	6

=== Bottom half ===
First round
6	(Japan) E Hozumi	6	4	2
(Japan) M Imanishi	3	6	6
(Japan) R Sawayanagi	5	6	2
WC	(Japan) Y Tanaka	7	3	6
Q	(Japan) A Omae	6	6
Q	(United States) T Kinard	4	3
(China) X Han	4	0
4	(Belgium) A-S Mestach	6	6
7	(Japan) H Kuwata	6^{6}	1
(Japan) M Hibi	7^{8}	6
(Japan) E Sema	6	6
(Japan) N Hibino	4	2
(Thailand) N Lertcheewakarn	4	1
(Japan) R Ozaki	6	6
(Japan) M Inoue	4	1
2	(Japan) K Date-Krumm	6	6

Second round
(Japan) M Imanishi	6	6
WC	(Japan) Y Tanaka	4	1
Q	(Japan) A Omae	1	0
4	(Belgium) A-S Mestach	6	6
(Japan) M Hibi	6	6
(Japan) E Sema	3	2
(Japan) R Ozaki	4	2
2	(Japan) K Date-Krumm	6	6

Quarterfinals
(Japan) M Imanishi	2	2
4	(Belgium) A-S Mestach	6	6
(Japan) M Hibi	4	3
2	(Japan) K Date-Krumm	6	6

Semifinals
4	(Belgium) A-S Mestach	6	0
2	(Japan) K Date-Krumm	2	0^{r}
