= 2014 Dunlop World Challenge – Women's doubles =

Women's doubles
- 2014 Dunlop World Challenge

Final
- Champions: (Japan) Eri Hozumi (Japan) Makoto Ninomiya
- Runners-up: (Japan) Shuko Aoyama (Japan) Junri Namigata
- Score: 6–3, 7–5

Events
Singles	men	women
Doubles	men	women
← 2013 ·	Dunlop World Challenge	· 2015 →

Shuko Aoyama and Misaki Doi were the defending champions, however Doi chose not to participate. Aoyama partnered Junri Namigata, but lost in the final to Eri Hozumi and Makoto Ninomiya in an all-Japanese final, 6–3, 7–5.

== Seeds ==
1. (Japan) Shuko Aoyama / (Japan) Junri Namigata (final)
2. (Japan) Hiroko Kuwata / (Japan) Miki Miyamura (semifinals)
3. (Japan) Eri Hozumi / (Japan) Makoto Ninomiya (champions)
4. (China) Han Xinyun / (Thailand) Noppawan Lertcheewakarn (semifinals)

== Draw ==
=== Key ===
- Q = Qualifier
- WC = Wild card
- LL = Lucky loser
- Alt = Alternate
- SE = Special exempt
- PR = Protected ranking
- ITF = ITF entry
- JE = Junior exempt
- w/o = Walkover
- r = Retired
- d = Defaulted
- SR = Special ranking

First round
1	(Japan) S Aoyama (Japan) J Namigata	6	2	[11]
(Thailand) L Kumkhum (Thailand) T Tanasugarn	1	6	[9]
(Japan) R Fujiwara (Chinese Taipei) S-y Hsieh	6	6
(Japan) M Inoue (Japan) K Takahata	3	1
4	(China) X Han (Thailand) N Lertcheewakarn	6	7
(South Korea) N-l Han (South Korea) S-j Jang	1	5
(Japan) M Ayukawa (Japan) C Okadaue	6	6
(Japan) M Eguchi (Japan) R Sawayanagi	2	4
WC	(Japan) S Fukuda (Japan) M Kobori	1	6	[10]
(Japan) M Hibi (China) Y Xu	6	2	[1]
(Japan) E Sema (Japan) Y Sema	3	4
3	(Japan) E Hozumi (Japan) M Ninomiya	6	6
WC	(Russia) K Lykina (Japan) Y Tanaka	3	6^{5}
(Japan) N Hibino (Japan) M Kato	6	7^{7}
WC	(Japan) K Hisami (Japan) M Tanaka	0	6	[4]
2	(Japan) H Kuwata (Japan) M Miyamura	6	4	[10]

Quarterfinals
1	(Japan) S Aoyama (Japan) J Namigata	5	6	[10]
(Japan) R Fujiwara (Chinese Taipei) S-y Hsieh	7	2	[8]
4	(China) X Han (Thailand) N Lertcheewakarn	7^{11}	6
(Japan) M Ayukawa (Japan) C Okadaue	6^{9}	2
(Japan) S Fukuda (Japan) M Kobori	2	1
3	(Japan) E Hozumi (Japan) M Ninomiya	6	6
(Japan) N Hibino (Japan) M Kato	3	7	[8]
2	(Japan) H Kuwata (Japan) M Miyamura	6	5	[10]

Semifinals
1	(Japan) S Aoyama (Japan) J Namigata	6^{5}	7^{7}	[10]
4	(China) X Han (Thailand) N Lertcheewakarn	7^{7}	6^{5}	[2]
3	(Japan) E Hozumi (Japan) M Ninomiya	6	7
2	(Japan) H Kuwata (Japan) M Miyamura	2	5

Final
1	(Japan) S Aoyama (Japan) J Namigata	3	5
3	(Japan) E Hozumi (Japan) M Ninomiya	6	7
