= 2014 Anning Open =

- Date: 28 April – 3 May
- Edition: 3rd (ATP); 1st (ITF)
- Draw: 32S / 16D
- Prize money: $50,000
- Surface: Clay
- Location: Anning, China

Champions

Men's singles
- (Australia) Alex Bolt

Women's singles
- (China) Zheng Saisai

Men's doubles
- (Australia) Alex Bolt / (Australia) Andrew Whittington

Women's doubles
- (China) Han Xinyun / (China) Zhang Kailin
← 2013 ·	Anning Open	· 2015 →

The 2014 Anning Open was a professional tennis tournament played on clay courts. It was the third edition for men and first edition for women, of the tournament which is part of the 2014 ATP Challenger Tour and the 2014 ITF Women's Circuit. It took place in Anning, China between 28 April and 3 May 2014.

== Men's singles main-draw entrants ==
=== Seeds ===
Country	Player	Rank	Seed
JPN	Yūichi Sugita	150	1
SVN	Grega Žemlja	166	2
RUS	Alexander Kudryavtsev	188	3
CHN	Zhang Ze	207	4
AUS	Matt Reid	217	5
GRB	Daniel Cox	222	6
LTU	Laurynas Grigelis	232	7
RUS	Konstantin Kravchuk	243	8

=== Other entrants ===
The following players received wildcards into the singles main draw:

- (China) Li Yuanfeng
- (China) Liu Siyu
- (China) Wang Ruikai
- (China) Gong Maoxin

The following players received entry from the qualifying draw:

- (Italy) Giuseppe Menga
- (Belarus) Aliaksandr Bury
- (China) Wang Chuhan
- (Republic of Ireland) James Cluskey

== Women's singles main-draw entrants ==
=== Seeds ===
Country	Player	Rank^{1}	Seed
SRB	Jovana Jakšić	114	1
TPE	Hsieh Su-wei	117	2
SLO	Tadeja Majerič	127	3
CHN	Zheng Saisai	145	4
RUS	Irina Khromacheva	218	5
RUS	Marina Melnikova	239	6
NED	Cindy Burger	255	7
JPN	Nao Hibino	269	8

- ^{1} Rankings as of 21 April 2014

=== Other entrants ===
The following players received wildcards into the singles main draw:

- (China) Yang Zhaoxuan
- (China) Zhang Ying

The following players received entry from the qualifying draw:

- (Japan) Nozomi Fujioka
- (Japan) Riko Sawayanagi
- (China) Wang Yan
- (China) Zhu Lin

== Men's doubles main-draw entrants ==
=== Seeds ===
Country	Player	Country	Player	Rank	Seed
AUS	Alex Bolt	AUS	Andrew Whittington	206	1
RUS	Victor Baluda	RUS	Konstantin Kravchuk	224	2
GER	Dominik Meffert	GER	Tim Puetz	265	3
TPE	Lee Hsin-han	AUS	Matt Reid	327	4

=== Other entrants ===
The following pairs received wildcards into the doubles main draw:

- (China) Wang Ruikai / (China) Wang Ruixuan
- (China) Gong Pengxiang / (China) Gong Xiao
- (China) Liu Siyu / (China) Wang Chuhan

== Champions ==
=== Men's singles ===
- (Australia) Alex Bolt def. (Croatia) Nikola Mektić, 6–2, 7–5

=== Women's singles ===
- (China) Zheng Saisai def. (Serbia) Jovana Jakšić 6–2, 6–3

=== Men's doubles ===
- (Australia) Alex Bolt / (Australia) Andrew Whittington def. (United Kingdom) Daniel Cox / (China) Gong Maoxin, 6–4, 6–3

=== Women's doubles ===
- (China) Han Xinyun / (China) Zhang Kailin def. (Thailand) Varatchaya Wongteanchai / (Hong Kong) Zhang Ling 6–4, 6–2
