= 2012 ATP China International Tennis Challenge – Anning =

- Date: 16–22 July
- Edition: 1st
- Surface: Clay
- Location: Anning, China

Champions

Singles
- (Slovenia) Grega Žemlja

Doubles
- (Thailand) Sanchai Ratiwatana / (Thailand) Sonchat Ratiwatana
ATP China International Tennis Challenge – Anning	· 2013 →

The 2012 ATP China International Tennis Challenge – Anning was a professional tennis tournament played on clay courts. It was the first edition of the tournament which was part of the 2012 ATP Challenger Tour. It took place in Anning, China between 16 and 22 July 2012.

== Singles main draw entrants ==
=== Seeds ===
Country	Player	Rank^{1}	Seed
SVN	Aljaž Bedene	111	1
SVN	Grega Žemlja	123	2
TPE	Yang Tsung-hua	164	3
JPN	Yūichi Sugita	174	4
CHN	Zhang Ze	181	5
FRA	Josselin Ouanna	184	6
JPN	Hiroki Moriya	221	7
FRA	Laurent Rochette	228	8

- ^{1} Rankings are as of July 9, 2012.

=== Other entrants ===
The following players received wildcards into the singles main draw:

- (China) Ouyang Bowen
- (China) Wang Chuhan
- (China) W Gao
- (China) Gao Xin

The following players received entry from the qualifying draw:

- (Australia) Matthew Barton
- (Chinese Taipei) Lee Hsin-han
- (Japan) Arata Onozawa
- (Chinese Taipei) Yi Chu-huan

== Champions ==
=== Singles ===
- (Slovenia) Grega Žemlja def. (Slovenia) Aljaž Bedene, 1–6, 7–5, 6–3

=== Doubles ===
- (Thailand) Sanchai Ratiwatana / (Thailand) Sonchat Ratiwatana def. (South Africa) Ruan Roelofse / (Thailand) Kittipong Wachiramanowong, 4–6, 7–6^{(7–1)}, [13–11]
