= Bumpei Sato =

Japanese tennis player (born 1985)

- Country (sports): Japan
- Residence: Tokyo, Japan
- Born: 16 December 1985 (age 40)
- Retired: 2016
- Plays: right-handed (two-handed backhand)
- Prize money: $50,503

Singles
- Career record: 0–0 (at ATP Tour level, Grand Slam level, and in Davis Cup)
- Career titles: 0
- Highest ranking: No. 661 (20 October 2014)

Doubles
- Career record: 0–2 (at ATP Tour level, Grand Slam level, and in Davis Cup)
- Career titles: 12 ITF
- Highest ranking: No. 304 (9 June 2014)
- Last updated on: 13 April 2021.

Bumpei Sato (佐藤 文平, Satō Bumpei; born 16 December 1985) is a retired Japanese professional tennis player. He competed primarily on the ATP Challenger Tour and ITF Futures Tour, both in singles and doubles. He reached his highest ATP singles ranking of World No. 661 on October 20, 2014, and his highest ATP doubles ranking of World No. 304 on June 9, 2014.

== Career ==
During his tenure playing professional tennis, Sato only played in 2 ATP Tour - level matches. Both of these matches came in doubles at the 2012 World Team Cup tournament where he represented Japan. Partnering with Tatsuma Ito, the pair first lost during their matchup against Argentina to Juan Ignacio Chela and Juan Pablo Brzezicki 7–6^{(7–3)}, 1–6, [7–10] and then lost during their matchup against USA to James Blake and Ryan Harrison 6–4, 0–6, [3–10].

Sato reached 27 career doubles finals, winning 12 and falling in 15. Of those finals, he appeared just once at the ATP Challenger Tour level, at the 2014 Toyota Challenger in Toyota Japan, where he and partner Yang Tsung-hua of Taiwan lost to Japanese duo Toshihide Matsui / Yasutaka Uchiyama in straight sets 6–7^{(6-8)}, 2-6.

His last tournament was the Korea F8 ITF Futures, Anseong in September 2016 where he lost in the third round of qualifying in singles, and lost in the first round of doubles to end his professional tennis career.

He is married to retired Japanese WTA tennis player Maiko Inoue.

== ATP Challenger and ITF Futures finals ==
=== Doubles: 27 (12–15) ===
Legend ATP Challenger (0–1) ITF Futures (12–14)	Finals by surface Hard (8–12) Clay (4–2) Grass (0–0) Carpet (0–1)

Result	W–L	Date	Tournament	Tier	Surface	Partner	Opponents	Score
Loss	0–1	Mar 2009	Japan F2, Tokyo	Futures	Hard	(Japan) Sho Aida	(Japan) Satoshi Iwabuchi (Japan) Gouichi Motomura	2–6, 6–4, [8–10]
Loss	0–2	Oct 2009	Japan F9, Yokohama	Futures	Clay	(Chinese Taipei) Hsin-Han Lee	(Japan) Hiromasa Oku (Japan) Kousuke Sugimoto	0–6, 6–4, [8–10]
Win	1–2	Mar 2010	Japan F1, Tokyo	Futures	Hard	(Chinese Taipei) Chu-Huan Yi	(Japan) Tasuku Iwami (Japan) Hiroki Kondo	6–4, 6–4
Loss	1–3	Apr 2010	Japan F4, Tsukuba	Futures	Hard	(United States) Maciek Sykut	(Japan) Tasuku Iwami (Japan) Hiroki Moriya	4–6, 2–6
Win	2–3	Jul 2010	Japan F8, Sapporo	Futures	Clay	(Chinese Taipei) Hsin-Han Lee	(Japan) Tasuku Iwami (Japan) Hiroki Kondo	3–6, 6–4. [15–13]
Loss	2–4	Oct 2010	Japan F9, Kashiwa	Futures	Hard	(Finland) Harri Heliovaara	(Japan) Yuichi Ito (Chinese Taipei) Chu-Huan Yi	6–4, 1–6, [8–10]
Loss	2–5	Oct 2010	Japan F10, Tama	Futures	Hard	(Finland) Harri Heliovaara	(Japan) Tasuku Iwami (Japan) Hiroki Kondo	2–6, 4–6
Loss	2–6	Apr 2011	Thailand F2, Khon Kaen	Futures	Hard	(Chinese Taipei) Hsin-Han Lee	(Thailand) Weerapat Doakmaiklee (Thailand) Kittiphong Wachiramanowong	6–7^{(9–11)}, 2–6
Loss	2–7	Apr 2011	India F3, Chandigarh	Futures	Hard	(Chinese Taipei) Hsin-Han Lee	(India) Divij Sharan (India) Vishnu Vardhan	4–6, 6–4, [7–10]
Loss	2–8	May 2011	China F5, Nanjing	Futures	Hard	(Japan) Junn Mitsuhashi	(Chinese Taipei) Hsin-Han Lee (Chinese Taipei) Hsieh Cheng-peng	2–6, 4–6
Loss	2–9	Jun 2011	Guam F1, Tumon	Futures	Hard	(South Korea) Daniel Yoo	(Australia) Isaac Frost (Australia) Brendan Moore	6–7^{(4–7)}, 3–6
Win	3–9	Jun 2011	Japan F5, Karuizawa	Futures	Clay	(Chinese Taipei) Hsin-Han Lee	(Chinese Taipei) Junn Mitsuhashi (Chinese Taipei) Yasutaka Uchiyama	6–4, 5–7. [12–10]
Loss	3–10	Jul 2011	Japan F8, Sapporo	Futures	CLay	(Thailand) Kittiphong Wachiramanowong	(Australia) Hsin-Han Lee (Australia) Hsieh Cheng-peng	4–6, 6–3, [7-10]
Loss	3–11	Oct 2011	Laos F1, Vientiane	Futures	Hard	(Thailand) Danai Udomchoke	(Thailand) Sanchai Ratiwatana (Thailand) Sonchat Ratiwatana	2–6, 3–6
Win	4–11	Apr 2012	Japan F3, Kofu	Futures	Hard	(Chinese Taipei) Peng Hsien-yin	(China) Gao Xin (China) Yu Chang	6–3, 5–7. [10–6]
Win	5–11	Mar 2013	Japan F2, Tokyo	Futures	Hard	(Japan) Sho Katayama	(Japan) Shota Tagawa (Japan) Yasutaka Uchiyama	7–6^{(7–4]}, 6–4
Loss	5–12	Jun 2013	India F6, Chennai	Futures	Hard	(Japan) Toshihide Matsui	(India) N. Sriram Balaji (India) Jeevan Nedunchezhiyan	1–6, 4–6
Win	6–12	Jun 2013	Guam F1, Tumon	Futures	Hard	(Japan) Yasutaka Uchiyama	(Japan) Yuichi Ito (Japan) Takuto Niki	7–6^{(7–2]}, 6–4
Win	7–12	Jun 2013	Japan F5, Karuizawa	Futures	Clay	(Japan) Sho Katayama	(Japan) Koichi Sano (Japan) Masaki Sasai	6–1, 6–4
Loss	7–13	Jul 2013	Japan F8, Kashiwa	Futures	Hard	(Japan) Toshihide Matsui	(Japan) Hiroki Kondo (New Zealand) Jose Statham	4–6, 2–6
Win	8–13	Mar 2014	Japan F2, Tokyo	Futures	Hard	(Japan) Sho Katayama	(Japan) Yuichi Ito (Japan) Hiroki Kondo	6–2, 4–6, [10–6]
Win	9–13	Apr 2014	Japan F4, Tsukuba	Futures	Hard	(Japan) Sho Katayama	(South Korea) Lee Duck-hee (New Zealand) Finn Tearney	6–4, 6–4
Win	10–13	May 2014	Turkey F14, Antalya	Futures	Hard	(Japan) Sho Katayama	(Moldova) Andrei Ciumac (India) Ramkumar Ramanathan	6–3, 6–1
Win	11–13	Jun 2014	Guam F1, Tumon	Futures	Hard	(Japan) Takuto Niki	(Japan) Yuya Kibi (Japan) Tomohiro Masabayashi	6–1, 6–3
Win	12–13	Jun 2014	Japan F5, Karuizawa	Futures	Clay	(Japan) Sho Katayama	(Chinese Taipei) Wang Chieh-fu (Chinese Taipei) Yang Shao-Chi	7–5, 6–2
Loss	12–14	Nov 2014	Toyota, Japan	Challenger	Carpet	(Chinese Taipei) Yang Tsung-hua	(Japan) Toshihide Matsui (Japan) Yasutaka Uchiyama	6–7^{(6–8)}, 2–6
Loss	12–15	Aug 2015	China F13, Putian	Futures	Hard	(Japan) Sho Katayama	(Chinese Taipei) Chu-Huan Yi (China) Bai Yan	2–6, 6-7^{(4–7)}
