= Yuichi Ito =

Japanese tennis player (born 1986)

Yuichi Ito 井藤 祐一
- Country (sports): Japan
- Born: 6 August 1986 (age 39) Osaka, Japan
- Plays: Right-handed (two-handed backhand)
- Prize money: $114,385

Singles
- Career record: 0–1 (at ATP Tour level, Grand Slam level, and in Davis Cup)
- Career titles: 0
- Highest ranking: No. 325 (5 July 2010)

Doubles
- Career record: 0–0 (at ATP Tour level, Grand Slam level, and in Davis Cup)
- Career titles: 0
- Highest ranking: No. 328 (8 July 2013)

Yuichi Ito (井藤 祐一, Itō Yūichi; born 6 August 1986) is a Japanese tennis player.

Ito has a career high ATP singles ranking of No. 325 achieved on 5 July 2010. He also has a career high ATP doubles ranking of No. 328 achieved on 8 July 2013. Ito has won 4 ITF singles titles and 11 ITF doubles titles.

Ito made his ATP main draw debut at the 2008 AIG Japan Open Tennis Championships, where he qualified for the singles draw.

== ATP Challenger and ITF Futures finals ==
=== Singles: 8 (4–4) ===
Legend (singles) ATP Challenger Tour (0–0) ITF Futures Tour (4–4)	Finals by surface Hard (4–3) Clay (0–1) Grass (0–0) Carpet (0–0)

Result	W–L	Date	Tournament	Tier	Surface	Opponent	Score
Win	1–0	Sep 2007	Japan F8, Osaka	Futures	Hard	(Japan) Toshihide Matsui	6–1, 2–6, 6–4
Loss	1–1	Jul 2009	Japan F7, Sapporo	Futures	Clay	(Japan) Yuichi Sugita	3–6, 5–7
Loss	1–2	Aug 2009	China F5, Chongqing	Futures	Hard	(China) Shao-Xuan Zeng	4–6, 7–6^{(7–4)}, 2–6
Win	2–2	Aug 2009	China F6, Jiaxing	Futures	Hard	(South Korea) Min Hyeok Cho	6–4, 1–6, 7–5
Win	3–2	Mar 2010	Japan F1, Tokyo	Futures	Hard	(Japan) Hiroki Moriya	7–5, 1–6, 6–4
Win	4–2	Apr 2013	Japan F4, Tsukuba	Futures	Hard	(Japan) Issei Okamura	6–3, 3–6, 6–2
Loss	4–3	Sep 2013	Australia F8, Alice Springs	Futures	Hard	(Australia) Jordan Thompson	4–6, 1–6
Loss	4–4	Jun 2018	Guam F1, Tumon	Futures	Hard	(Japan) Yuta Shimizu	3–6, 2–6

=== Doubles: 38 (11–27) ===
Legend (doubles) ATP Challenger Tour (0–1) ITF Futures Tour (11–26)	Finals by surface Hard (10–23) Clay (0–2) Grass (0–0) Carpet (1–2)

Result	W–L	Date	Tournament	Tier	Surface	Partnet	Opponents	Score
Loss	0–1	May 2005	Japan F4, Munakata	Futures	Hard	(Japan) Katsushi Fukuda	(United States) Phillip King (United States) Michael Yani	4–6, 4–6
Loss	0–2	Jun 2006	Japan F6, Karuizawa	Futures	Clay	(Japan) Katsushi Fukuda	(Japan) Yaoki Ishii (Japan) Satoshi Iwabuchi	3–6, 0–6
Loss	0–3	Apr 2009	India F3, New Delhi	Futures	Hard	(South Africa) Raven Klaasen	(India) N.Sriram Balaji (India) Ashutosh Singh	6–7^{(1–7)}, 6–7^{(7–9)}
Win	1–3	Jun 2009	Japan F5, Kusatsu	Futures	Carpet	(Thailand) Weerapat Doakmaiklee	(Japan) Hiroki Kondo (Japan) Kento Takeuchi	6–7^{(4–7)}, 7–6^{(7–4)}, [12-10]
Loss	1–4	Jul 2009	Japan F7, Sapporo	Futures	Clay	(Japan) Tatsuma Ito	(Japan) Hiroki Kondo (Japan) Takao Suzuki	3–6, 6–7^{(4–7)}
Loss	1–5	Jun 2010	Japan F6, Kusatsu	Futures	Carpet	(Chinese Taipei) Lee Hsin-Han	(Chinese Taipei) Chen I-Ta (Chinese Taipei) Hsieh Cheng-peng	4–6, 5–7
Win	2–5	Oct 2010	Japan F9, Kashiwa	Futures	Hard	(Chinese Taipei) Yi Chu-Huan	(Finland) Harri Heliovaara (Japan) Bumpei Sato	4–6, 6–1, [10-8]
Loss	2–6	May 2011	Indonesia F1, Jakarta	Futures	Hard	(Japan) Kento Takeuchi	(Chinese Taipei) Lee Hsin-Han (Chinese Taipei) Hsieh Cheng-peng	6–7^{(5–7)}, 6–7^{(4–7)}
Loss	2–7	Jul 2011	Chinese Taipei F1, Taipei	Futures	Hard	(Chinese Taipei) Yi Chu-Huan	(Chinese Taipei) Lee Hsin-Han (Chinese Taipei) Hsieh Cheng-peng	3–6, 2–6
Loss	2–8	Oct 2011	USA F25, Laguna Niguel	Futures	Hard	(Japan) Yaoki Ishii	(United States) Benjamin Rogers (Australia) John-Patrick Smith	3–6, 6–7^{(3–7)}
Loss	2–9	Jul 2012	Granby, Canada	Challenger	Hard	(Japan) Takuto Niki	(Canada) Philip Bester (Canada) Vasek Pospisil	1–6, 2–6
Win	3–9	Aug 2012	Canada F6, Winnipeg	Futures	Hard	(Croatia) Ante Pavic	(Canada) Filip Peliwo (Canada) Milan Pokrajac	3–6, 6–3, [20-18]
Loss	3–10	Sep 2012	Australia F7, Happy Valley	Futures	Hard	(Japan) Yusuke Watanuki	(Australia) Luke Saville (Australia) Andrew Whittington	3–6, 2–6
Loss	3–11	Apr 2013	Japan F4, Tsukuba	Futures	Hard	(Japan) Shota Tagawa	(Japan) Daiki Kondo (Japan) Masato Shiga	3–6, 6–7^{(2–7)}
Win	4–11	Apr 2013	China F1, Chengdu	Futures	Hard	(Japan) Hiroki Kondo	(Australia) Brydan Klein (Thailand) Danai Udomchoke	6–4, 6–4
Loss	4–12	Jun 2013	Guam F1, Tumon	Futures	Hard	(Japan) Takuto Niki	(Japan) Bumpei Sato (Japan) Yasutaka Uchiyama	6–7^{(2–7)}, 4–6
Loss	4–13	Aug 2013	Chinese Taipei F1, Taipei	Futures	Hard	(Japan) Hiroki Kondo	(Chinese Taipei) Ti Chen (Chinese Taipei) Huang Liang-Chi	1–6, 1–6
Loss	4–14	Dec 2013	Thailand F4, Bangkok	Futures	Hard	(Japan) Yasutaka Uchiyama	(South Korea) Lim Yong-kyu (South Korea) Noh Sang-Woo	5–7, 6–7^{(4–7)}
Loss	4–15	Dec 2013	Thailand F5, Bangkok	Futures	Hard	(Japan) Yasutaka Uchiyama	(China) Gao Peng (China) Gao Wan	4–6, 7–6^{(7–3)}, [14-16]
Win	5–15	Feb 2014	Thailand F1, Nonthaburi	Futures	Hard	(Japan) Hiroki Kondo	(United Kingdom) Lewis Burton (United Kingdom) Marcus Willis	3–6, 6–3, [10-8]
Loss	5–16	Mar 2014	Japan F2, Tokyo	Futures	Hard	(Japan) Hiroki Kondo	(Japan) Bumpei Sato (Japan) Sho Katayama	2–6, 6–4, [6-10]
Loss	5–17	Mar 2015	Japan F1, Nishi-Tama	Futures	Hard	(Japan) Arata Onozawa	(Japan) Yuya Kibi (Japan) Takuto Niki	3–6, 6–3, [9-11]
Win	6–17	Mar 2015	Japan F2, Tokyo	Futures	Hard	(Chinese Taipei) Yi Chu-Huan	(Japan) Shintaro Imai (Japan) Yuhei Kono	6–3, 3–6, [12-10]
Win	7–17	May 2015	Thailand F2, Bangkok	Futures	Hard	(Japan) Sho Katayama	(Japan) Ken Onoda (Japan) Masato Shiga	6–4, 6–4
Loss	7–18	May 2015	Thailand F3, Bangkok	Futures	Hard	(Japan) Sho Katayama	(Thailand) Pruchya Isaro (Thailand) Nuttanon Kadchapanan	4–6, 4–6
Win	8–18	May 2015	Guam F1, Tumon	Futures	Hard	(India) Jeevan Nedunchezhiyan	(Japan) Masakatsu Noguchi (Japan) Masaki Sasai	2–6, 6–3, [10-7]
Loss	8–19	Apr 2016	Japan F4, Tsukuba	Futures	Hard	(Japan) Sho Katayama	(New Zealand) Ben Mclachlan (New Zealand) Finn Tearney	6–3, 4–6, [4-10]
Win	9–19	Apr 2016	Japan F5, Kashiwa	Futures	Hard	(Japan) Sho Katayama	(Japan) Shintaro Imai (Japan) Takuto Niki	6–3, 6–3
Loss	9–20	May 2016	India F1, Chandigarh	Futures	Hard	(Japan) Sho Katayama	(India) N.Sriram Balaji (India) Vishnu Vardhan	1–6, 4–6
Win	10–20	May 2016	India F2, Jassowal	Futures	Hard	(Japan) Sho Katayama	(India) Mohit Mayur Jayaprakash (India) Vinayak Sharma Kaza	7–5, 7–5
Loss	10–21	Jun 2016	Japan F8, Akishima	Futures	Carpet	(Japan) Kaito Uesugo	(Japan) Katsuki Nagao (Japan) [Hiromasa Oku	4–6, 2–6
Win	11–21	Sep 2016	Thailand F3, Hua Hin	Futures	Hard	(Japan) Jumpei Yamasaki	(Thailand) Patcharapol Kawin (Thailand) Jirat Navasirisomboon	6–3, 6–3
Loss	11–22	Feb 2017	Turkey F5, Antalya	Futures	Hard	(Ukraine) Marat Deviatiarov	(Czech Republic) Michal Konecny (Czech Republic) Matěj Vocel	3–6, 6–3, [7-10]
Loss	11–23	Mar 2017	Japan F3, Kofu	Futures	Hard	(Japan) Jumpei Yamasaki	(Japan) Katsuki Nagao (Japan) Hiromasa Oku	4–6, 7–6^{(7–4)}, [3-10]
Loss	11–24	Jun 2017	Singapore F3, Singapore	Futures	Hard	(Vietnam) Nam Hoang Ly	(Philippines) Francis Casey Alcantara (Netherlands) Sem Verbeek	6–7^{(3–7)}, 2–6
Loss	11–25	Oct 2017	Thailand F8, Nonthaburi	Futures	Hard	(Vietnam) Nam Hoang Ly	(Thailand) Pruchya Isaro (Japan) Masato Shiga	3–6, 1–6
Loss	11–26	Nov 2017	Malaysia F3, Kuala Lumpur	Futures	Hard	(Thailand) Nuttanon Kadchapanan	(China) Aoran Wang (Uzbekistan) Jurabek Karimov	6–7^{(5–7)}, 4–6
Loss	11–27	Dec 2017	Israel F17, Tiberias	Futures	Hard	(Ukraine) Vladyslav Orlov	(Germany) Christian Hirschmueller (Ukraine) Volodymyr Uzhylovskyi	3–6, 4–6
