= 2013 ATP China International Tennis Challenge – Anning =

- Date: 29 April – 5 May
- Edition: 2nd
- Draw: 32S / 16D
- Prize money: $50,000
- Surface: Clay
- Location: Anning, China

Champions

Singles
- (Hungary) Márton Fucsovics

Doubles
- (Russia) Victor Baluda / (Croatia) Dino Marcan
← 2012 ·	ATP China International Tennis Challenge – Anning	· 2014 →

The 2013 ATP China International Tennis Challenge – Anning was a professional tennis tournament played on clay courts. It was the second edition of the tournament which was part of the 2013 ATP Challenger Tour. It took place in Anning, China between 29 April and 5 May 2013.

== Singles main draw entrants ==
=== Seeds ===
Country	Player	Rank^{1}	Seed
AUS	Matthew Ebden	136	1
BEL	Ruben Bemelmans	139	2
CHN	Zhang Ze	157	3
FRA	Josselin Ouanna	158	4
CHN	Wu Di	173	5
JPN	Hiroki Moriya	192	6
FRA	Vincent Millot	206	7
AUS	Samuel Groth	211	8

- ^{1} Rankings are as of April 22, 2013.

=== Other entrants ===
The following players received wildcards into the singles main draw:

- (China) Gao Peng
- (China) Li Yucheng
- (China) Wang Chuhan
- (China) Wang Ruikai

The following players received entry from the qualifying draw:

- (Australia) Chris Guccione
- (Japan) Tatsuma Ito
- (United Kingdom) James Ward
- (China) Zhao Cai

== Doubles main draw entrants ==
=== Seeds ===
Country	Player	Country	Player	Rank^{1}	Seed
THA	Sanchai Ratiwatana	THA	Sonchat Ratiwatana	146	1
AUS	Samuel Groth	AUS	John-Patrick Smith	209	2
AUS	Chris Guccione	AUS	Matt Reid	255	3
TPE	Lee Hsin-han	TPE	Peng Hsien-yin	267	4

- ^{1} Rankings as of April 22, 2013.

=== Other entrants ===
The following pairs received wildcards into the doubles main draw:

- (China) Feng Nian / (China) Wang Chuhan
- (China) Gao Peng / (China) Gao Wan
- (China) Tan Haiyun / (China) Wang Ruikai

== Champions ==
=== Singles ===
- (Hungary) Márton Fucsovics def. (United Kingdom) James Ward, 7–5, 3–6, 6–3

=== Doubles ===
- (Russia) Victor Baluda / (Croatia) Dino Marcan def. (Australia) Samuel Groth / (Australia) John-Patrick Smith, 6–7^{(5–7)}, 6–4, [10–7]
