= Yusuke Watanuki =

Japanese tennis player (born 1990)

Yusuke Watanuki 綿貫 裕介
- Country (sports): Japan
- Born: 20 May 1990 (age 35); Saitama, Japan
- Height: 1.68 m (5 ft 6 in)
- Plays: Right-handed (two-handed backhand)
- Prize money: $46,503

Singles
- Career record: 0–0 (at ATP Tour level, Grand Slam level, and in Davis Cup)
- Career titles: 0
- Highest ranking: No. 477 (29 September 2014)
- Current ranking: No. 741 (3 July 2017)

Doubles
- Career record: 0–0 (at ATP Tour level, Grand Slam level, and in Davis Cup)
- Career titles: 0
- Highest ranking: No. 520 (12 June 2017)
- Current ranking: No. 560 (3 July 2017)

Mixed doubles
- Career record: 1–1

Grand Slam mixed doubles results
- Wimbledon: 2R (2017)
- Last updated on: 8 July 2017.

Yusuke Watanuki (綿貫 裕介, Watanuki Yūsuke, born 20 May 1990) is a Japanese tennis player.

Watanuki has a career high ATP singles ranking of 477 achieved on 29 September 2014. He also has a career high ATP doubles ranking of 520 achieved on 12 June 2017.
