= Yanina Wickmayer career statistics =

Career statistics of female tennis player

Career finals
| Discipline | Type | Won | Lost | Total |
|---|---|---|---|---|
| Singles | Grand Slam | – | – | – |
| Singles | WTA Finals | – | – | – |
| Singles | WTA 1000 | – | – | – |
| Singles | WTA Tour | 5 | 6 | 11 |
| Singles | Olympics | – | – | – |
| Singles | Total | 5 | 6 | 11 |
| Doubles | Grand Slam | – | – | – |
| Doubles | WTA Finals | – | – | – |
| Doubles | WTA 1000 | – | – | – |
| Doubles | WTA Tour | 4 | 2 | 6 |
| Doubles | Olympics | – | – | – |
| Doubles | Total | 4 | 2 | 6 |

This is a list of the main career statistics of professional Belgian tennis player Yanina Wickmayer.

== Performance timelines ==
Key
| W | F | SF | QF | #R | RR | Q# | DNQ | A | NH |

(W) winner; (F) finalist; (SF) semifinalist; (QF) quarterfinalist; (#R) rounds 4, 3, 2, 1; (RR) round-robin stage; (Q#) qualification round; (DNQ) did not qualify; (A) absent; (NH) not held; (SR) strike rate (events won / competed); (W–L) win–loss record.
To avoid confusion and double counting, these charts are updated at the conclusion of a tournament or when the player's participation has ended.

Only main-draw results in WTA Tour, Grand Slam tournaments, Fed Cup/Billie Jean King Cup, Hopman Cup, United Cup and Olympic Games are included in win–loss records.

=== Singles ===
| Tournament | 2007 | 2008 | 2009 | 2010 | 2011 | 2012 | 2013 | 2014 | 2015 | 2016 | 2017 | 2018 | 2019 | 2020 | 2021 | 2022 | 2023 | 2024 | 2025 | SR | W–L | Win% |
|---|---|---|---|---|---|---|---|---|---|---|---|---|---|---|---|---|---|---|---|---|---|---|
Grand Slam tournaments
| Australian Open | A | Q2 | 1R | 4R | 2R | 1R | 3R | 2R | 4R | 1R | 1R | Q2 | Q1 | Q2 | A | A | A | 1R | A | 0 / 10 | 10–10 | 50% |
| French Open | A | 1R | 2R | 3R | 3R | 1R | 1R | 2R | 1R | 3R | 1R | 1R | Q1 | Q1 | A | A | Q2 | A | | 0 / 11 | 8–11 | 42% |
| Wimbledon | A | 1R | 1R | 3R | 4R | 3R | 1R | 2R | 1R | 1R | 2R | 3R | 2R | NH | A | 2R | 1R | A | | 0 / 14 | 13–14 | 48% |
| US Open | A | 1R | SF | 4R | 2R | 2R | 1R | 1R | 2R | 1R | 2R | 1R | Q2 | 1R | A | Q2 | 2R | A | | 0 / 13 | 13–13 | 50% |
| Win–loss | 0–0 | 0–3 | 6–4 | 10–4 | 7–4 | 3–4 | 2–4 | 3–4 | 4–4 | 2–4 | 2–4 | 2–3 | 1–1 | 0–1 | 0–0 | 1–1 | 1–2 | 0–1 | | 0 / 48 | 44–48 | 48% |
Year–end championships
| WTA Elite Trophy (Note: Formerly known as WTA Tournament of Champions until 2015.) | NH | | RR | 1R | DNQ | | | | | | | | | NH | | | DNQ | NH | | 0 / 2 | 1–1 | 50% |
National representation
| Summer Olympics | NH | A | NH | | | 2R | NH | | | 1R | NH | | | | A | NH | | A | NH | 0 / 2 | 1–2 | 33% |
| Billie Jean King Cup (Note: Formerly known as Fed Cup until 2020.) | 1R | WG2 | WG2 | PO | SF | 1R | WG2 | Z1 | Z1 | PO2 | PO | A | 1R | A (Note: Edition is split into the two years due to COVID-19.) | | A | QR | A | A | 0 / 4 | 23–10 | 70% |
WTA 1000
| Dubai / Qatar Open (Note: The first Premier 5 event of the year has switched back and forth between the Dubai Tennis Championships and the Qatar Ladies Open since 2009. Dubai was classified as a Premier 5 event from 2009 to 2011 before being succeeded by Doha for the 2012–2014 period. In 2015, Dubai regained its Premier 5 status while Doha was demoted to Premier status. The Premier 5 tournaments were reclassified as WTA 1000 tournaments in 2021.) | NMS | A | A | 1R | 3R | QF | 1R | QF | A | A | A | A | A | A | A | A | A | A | A | 0 / 5 | 8–5 | 62% |
| Indian Wells Open | A | A | 2R | 4R* | SF | 2R | 3R | 2R | 2R | 2R | 2R | 2R | Q2 | NH | A | A | A | Q1 | Q1 | 0 / 10 | 13–10 | 57% |
| Miami Open | A | A | 1R | QF | 2R | 4R | 2R | 1R | 1R | 3R | 1R | Q2 | 2R | NH | A | A | A | Q2 | A | 0 / 10 | 8–10 | 44% |
| Madrid Open | NH | | A | A | 1R | 2R | 1R | A | A | 1R | A | A | A | NH | A | A | A | Q1 | Q1 | 0 / 4 | 1–4 | 20% |
| Italian Open | A | A | A | 3R | 3R | 1R | 2R | A | A | 1R | A | A | A | A | A | A | A | A | | 0 / 5 | 5–5 | 50% |
| Canadian Open | A | A | 1R | 2R | 1R | 1R | 2R | 1R | 1R | 1R | A | Q1 | A | NH | A | A | A | A | | 0 / 8 | 2–8 | 20% |
| Cincinnati Open | NMS | | 2R | QF | 2R | 1R | 1R | 1R | A | A | A | A | A | A | A | A | A | A | | 0 / 6 | 5–6 | 45% |
| Guadalajara Open | NH | | | | | | | | | | | | | | | A | 1R | NMS | | 0 / 1 | 0–1 | 0% |
| Pan Pacific / Wuhan Open (Note: In 2014, the Pan Pacific Open was downgraded to a Premier event and replaced by the Wuhan Open. The Premier 5 tournaments were reclassified as WTA 1000 tournaments in 2021.) | A | A | A | 1R | A | 1R | A | A | A | 2R | A | A | Q1 | NH | | | | A | | 0 / 3 | 1–3 | 25% |
| China Open | NH | | 1R | 1R | A | 1R | A | A | A | 2R | A | A | A | NH | | | Q2 | A | | 0 / 4 | 1–4 | 20% |
| Win–loss | 0–0 | 0–0 | 2–5 | 11–8 | 9–7 | 6–9 | 3–7 | 4–5 | 1–3 | 5–7 | 1–2 | 1–1 | 1–1 | 0–0 | 0–0 | 0–0 | 0–1 | 0–0 | 0–0 | 0 / 56 | 44–56 | 44% |
Career statistics
| | 2007 | 2008 | 2009 | 2010 | 2011 | 2012 | 2013 | 2014 | 2015 | 2016 | 2017 | 2018 | 2019 | 2020 | 2021 | 2022 | 2023 | 2024 | 2025 | SR | W–L | Win% |
| Tournaments | 0 (Note: During the season, she did not play in the main draw of any tour-level tournaments. However, she played at the Billie Jean King Cup, which is not counted as a played tournament but matches counted.) | 14 | 19 | 22 | 18 | 26 | 24 | 19 | 18 | 25 | 14 | 5 | 2 | 1 | 0 | 3 | 5 | 3 | 0 | Career total: 218 | | |
| Titles | 0 | 0 | 2 | 1 | 0 | 0 | 0 | 0 | 1 | 1 | 0 | 0 | 0 | 0 | 0 | 0 | 0 | 0 | 0 | Career total: 5 | | |
| Finals | 0 | 1 | 3 | 1 | 1 | 2 | 1 | 0 | 1 | 1 | 0 | 0 | 0 | 0 | 0 | 0 | 0 | 0 | 0 | Career total: 11 | | |
| Hard win–loss | 0–1 | 7–10 | 19–13 | 24–15 | 18–12 | 21–16 | 12–16 | 11–16 | 14–12 | 15–15 | 9–9 | 1–2 | 1–2 | 0–1 | 0–0 | 1–2 | 5–5 | 0–3 | 0–0 | 4 / 146 | 158–150 | 51% |
| Clay win–loss | 1–1 | 2–2 | 8–2 | 7–3 | 8–5 | 7–7 | 2–6 | 2–2 | 3–3 | 4–5 | 1–3 | 0–1 | 0–0 | 0–0 | 0–0 | 0–0 | 0–0 | 0–0 | 0–0 | 1 / 40 | 45–40 | 53% |
| Grass win–loss | 0–0 | 5–2 | 7–3 | 4–3 | 5–2 | 3–3 | 4–3 | 2–3 | 2–2 | 2–4 | 2–2 | 2–2 | 1–1 | 0–0 | 0–0 | 1–1 | 0–1 | 0–0 | 0–0 | 0 / 32 | 40–32 | 56% |
| Overall win–loss | 1–2 | 14–14 | 34–18 | 35–21 | 31–19 | 31–26 | 18–25 | 15–21 | 19–17 | 21–24 | 12–14 | 3–5 | 2–3 | 0–1 | 0–0 | 2–3 | 5–6 | 0–3 | 0–0 | 5 / 218 | 243–222 | 52% |
| Year–end ranking (Note: 2006: WTA ranking–534.) | 221 | 69 | 16 | 23 | 26 | 23 | 59 | 67 | 49 | 52 | 112 | 113 | 152 | 165 | 339 | 328 | 74 | 756 | | $5,766,538 | | |

=== Doubles ===
| Tournament | 2008 | 2009 | 2010 | 2011 | 2012 | 2013 | 2014 | 2015 | 2016 | 2017 | ... | 2020 | 2021 | 2022 | 2023 | W–L |
|---|---|---|---|---|---|---|---|---|---|---|---|---|---|---|---|---|
| Australian Open | A | 1R | 2R | 1R | A | 2R | 1R | 1R | 1R | 1R | | A | A | A | A | 2–8 |
| French Open | 1R | 1R | A | A | 1R | A | 1R | 1R | 1R | 2R | | 1R | A | A | A | 1–8 |
| Wimbledon | A | 2R | 1R | A | 1R | 2R | 2R | A | 2R | A | | NH | A | 1R | A | 4–7 |
| US Open | 1R | 1R | 1R | A | A | 1R | 1R | A | 1R | A | | A | A | 1R | | 0–7 |
| Win–loss | 0–2 | 1–4 | 1–3 | 0–1 | 0–2 | 2–3 | 1–4 | 0–2 | 1–4 | 1–2 | | 0–1 | 0–0 | 0–2 | | 7–30 |

== WTA Tour finals ==
=== Singles: 11 (5 titles, 6 runner-ups) ===
| Legend WTA 1000 (–) WTA 500 (–) WTA 250 (5–6) | Finals by surface Hard (4–3) Grass (0–2) Clay (1–1) |

| Result | W–L | Date | Tournament | Tier | Surface | Opponent | Score |
|---|---|---|---|---|---|---|---|
| Loss | 0–1 | Jun 2008 | Birmingham Classic, UK | Tier III (Note: The WTA Tier III tournaments, WTA Tier IV tournaments and WTA Tier V tournaments were reclassified as WTA International tournaments in 2009 and later as WTA 250 tournaments in 2021.) | Grass | (Ukraine) Kateryna Bondarenko | 6–7^{(7–9)}, 6–3, 6–7^{(4–7)} |
| Win | 1–1 | May 2009 | Estoril Open, Portugal | International | Clay | (Russia) Ekaterina Makarova | 7–5, 6–2 |
| Loss | 1–2 | Jun 2009 | Rosmalen Championships, Netherlands | International | Grass | (Thailand) Tamarine Tanasugarn | 3–6, 5–7 |
| Win | 2–2 | Oct 2009 | Ladies Linz, Austria | International | Hard | (Czech Republic) Petra Kvitová | 6–3, 6–4 |
| Win | 3–2 | Jan 2010 | Auckland Open, New Zealand | International | Hard | (Italy) Flavia Pennetta | 6–3, 6–2 |
| Loss | 3–3 | Jan 2011 | Auckland Open, New Zealand | International | Hard | (Hungary) Gréta Arn | 3–6, 3–6 |
| Loss | 3–4 | Jan 2012 | Hobart International, Australia | International | Hard | (Germany) Mona Barthel | 1–6, 2–6 |
| Loss | 3–5 | Jun 2012 | Gastein Ladies, Austria | International | Clay | (France) Alizé Cornet | 5–7, 6–7^{(1–7)} |
| Loss | 3–6 | Jan 2013 | Auckland Open, New Zealand | International | Hard | (Poland) Agnieszka Radwańska | 4–6, 4–6 |
| Win | 4–6 | Sep 2015 | Japan Women's Open, Japan | International | Hard | (Poland) Magda Linette | 4–6, 6–3, 6–3 |
| Win | 5–6 | Jul 2016 | Washington Open, US | International | Hard | (United States) Lauren Davis | 6–4, 6–2 |

=== Doubles: 6 (4 titles, 2 runner-ups) ===
| Legend WTA 500 (0–1) WTA 250 (4–1) | Finals by surface Hard (4–1) Grass (0–1) |

| Result | W–L | Date | Tournament | Tier | Surface | Partner | Opponents | Score |
|---|---|---|---|---|---|---|---|---|
| Loss | 0–1 | Jun 2009 | Rosmalen Championships, Netherlands | International | Grass | (Netherlands) Michaëlla Krajicek | (Italy) Sara Errani (Italy) Flavia Pennetta | 4–6, 7–5, [11–13] |
| Win | 1–1 | Oct 2013 | Luxembourg Open, Luxembourg | International | Hard (i) | (Liechtenstein) Stephanie Vogt | (Germany) Kristina Barrois (France) Laura Thorpe | 7–6^{(7–2)}, 6–4 |
| Win | 2–1 | Jul 2016 | Washington Open, US | International | Hard | (Romania) Monica Niculescu | (Japan) Shuko Aoyama (Japan) Risa Ozaki | 6–4, 6–3 |
| Loss | 2–2 | Sep 2019 | Zhengzhou Open, China | Premier (Note: The WTA Premier tournaments were reclassified as WTA 500 tournaments in 2021.) | Hard | (Slovenia) Tamara Zidanšek | (United States) Nicole Melichar (Czech Republic) Květa Peschke | 1–6, 6–7^{(2–7)} |
| Win | 3–2 | Sep 2022 | Korea Open, South Korea | WTA 250 | Hard | (France) Kristina Mladenovic | (United States) Asia Muhammad (United States) Sabrina Santamaria | 6–3, 6–2 |
| Win | 4–2 | Jul 2023 | Poland Open, Poland | WTA 250 | Hard | (United Kingdom) Heather Watson | (Poland) Weronika Falkowska (Poland) Katarzyna Piter | 6–4, 6–4 |

== WTA 125 finals ==
=== Singles: 2 (1 title, 1 runner-up) ===
| Result | W–L | Date | Tournament | Surface | Opponent | Score |
|---|---|---|---|---|---|---|
| Loss | 0–1 | Nov 2013 | Taipei Open, Taiwan | Carpet (i) | (Belgium) Alison Van Uytvanck | 4–6, 2–6 |
| Win | 1–1 | Nov 2015 | Carlsbad Classic, United States | Hard | (United States) Nicole Gibbs | 6–3, 7–6^{(7–4)} |

=== Doubles: 4 (1 title, 3 runner-ups) ===
| Result | W–L | Date | Tournament | Surface | Partner | Opponents | Score |
|---|---|---|---|---|---|---|---|
| Win | 1–0 | Mar 2018 | Indian Wells Challenger, United States | Hard | (United States) Taylor Townsend | (United States) Jennifer Brady (United States) Vania King | 6–4, 6–4 |
| Loss | 1–1 | Apr 2018 | Zhengzhou Open, China | Hard | (United Kingdom) Naomi Broady | (China) Duan Yingying (China) Wang Yafan | 6–7^{(5–7)}, 3–6 |
| Loss | 1–2 | Jan 2019 | Newport Beach Challenger, United States | Hard | (United States) Taylor Townsend | (United States) Hayley Carter (United States) Ena Shibahara | 3–6, 6–7^{(1–7)} |
| Loss | 1–3 | Mar 2019 | Indian Wells Challenger, United States | Hard | (United States) Taylor Townsend | (Czech Republic) Kristýna Plíšková (Russia) Evgeniya Rodina | 6–7^{(7–9)}, 4–6 |

== ITF Circuit finals ==
=== Singles: 24 (14 titles, 10 runner-ups) ===
| Legend $100,000 tournaments (3–0) $75,000 tournaments (0–1) $50/60,000 tournaments (2–5) $40,000 tournaments (1–1) $25,000 tournaments (5–1) $10,000 tournaments (3–2) | Finals by surface Hard (7–8) Clay (5–2) Grass (1–0) Carpet (1–0) |

| Result | W–L | Date | Tournament | Tier | Surface | Opponent | Score |
|---|---|---|---|---|---|---|---|
| Loss | 0–1 | May 2006 | ITF Edinburgh, United Kingdom | 10,000 | Clay | (Sweden) Mari Andersson | 6–0, 1–6, 3–6 |
| Win | 1–1 | Aug 2006 | ITF Koksijde, Belgium | 10,000 | Clay | (Germany) Kristina Steiert | 6–4, 6–1 |
| Win | 2–1 | Nov 2006 | ITF Florianópolis, Brazil | 10,000 | Clay | (Uruguay) Estefanía Craciún | 6–1, 6–0 |
| Win | 3–1 | Nov 2006 | ITF Córdoba, Argentina | 10,000 | Clay | (Brazil) Teliana Pereira | 6–1, 6–7^{(4)}, 6–0 |
| Loss | 3–2 | Apr 2007 | Torhout Ladies Open, Belgium | 10,000 | Hard | (France) Claire Feuerstein | 4–6, 4–6 |
| Win | 4–2 | Jul 2007 | ITF Les Contamines, France | 25,000 | Hard | (France) Julie Coin | 6–2, 7–6^{(3)} |
| Win | 5–2 | Oct 2007 | ITF Hamanako, Japan | 25,000 | Carpet | (Japan) Junri Namigata | 4–6, 6–4, 6–2 |
| Loss | 5–3 | Nov 2007 | Taipei Open, Taiwan | 50,000 | Hard | (Japan) Akiko Morigami | 4–6, 6–7^{(5)} |
| Win | 6–3 | Nov 2007 | ITF Taizhou, China | 25,000 | Hard | (China) Han Xinyun | 6–2, 6–2 |
| Win | 7–3 | Nov 2007 | Kunming Open, China | 50,000 | Hard | (Poland) Urszula Radwańska | 7–5, 6–4 |
| Loss | 7–4 | Mar 2008 | New Delhi Open, India | 50,000 | Hard | (Belarus) Ekaterina Dzehalevich | 6–2, 3–6, 2–6 |
| Loss | 7–5 | Apr 2008 | ITF Monzón, Spain | 75,000 | Hard | (Czech Republic) Petra Kvitová | 6–2, 4–6, 5–7 |
| Win | 8–5 | May 2008 | ITF Indian Harbour Beach, United States | 50,000 | Clay | (United States) Bethanie Mattek | 6–4, 7–5 |
| Win | 9–5 | Feb 2009 | ITF Surprise, United States | 25,000 | Hard | (Ukraine) Julia Vakulenko | 6–7^{(0)}, 6–3, 4–3 ret. |
| Loss | 9–6 | Mar 2009 | Clearwater Open, United States | 50,000 | Hard | (France) Julie Coin | 6–3, 1–1 ret. |
| Loss | 9–7 | Mar 2009 | Open Saint-Gaudens, France | 50,000 | Clay | (Belarus) Anastasiya Yakimova | 5–7, 6–7^{(0)} |
| Win | 10–7 | Oct 2010 | Torhout Ladies Open, Belgium | 100,000 | Hard | (Romania) Simona Halep | 6–3, 6–2 |
| Win | 11–7 | Feb 2018 | ITF Surprise, United States (2) | 25,000 | Hard | (Mexico) Ana Sofía Sánchez | 3–6, 6–3, 6–4 |
| Loss | 11–8 | Feb 2019 | GB Pro-Series Shrewsbury, UK | 60,000 | Hard (i) | (Russia) Vitalia Diatchenko | 7–5, 1–6, 4–6 |
| Loss | 11–9 | May 2022 | ITF Netanya, Israel | 25,000 | Hard | (Australia) Priscilla Hon | 1–6, 3–6 |
| Win | 12–9 | Jan 2023 | ITF Tallinn, Estonia | 40,000 | Hard (i) | (North Macedonia) Lina Gjorcheska | 6–1, 2–0 ret. |
| Loss | 12–10 | Feb 2023 | ITF Mâcon, France | 40,000 | Hard (i) | (France) Jessika Ponchet | 3–6, 6–2, 4–6 |
| Win | 13–10 | May 2023 | Empire Slovak Open, Slovakia | 100,000 | Clay | (Belgium) Greet Minnen | 6–0, 6–3 |
| Win | 14–10 | June 2023 | Surbiton Trophy, United Kingdom | 100,000 | Grass | (United Kingdom) Katie Swan | 2–6, 6–4, 7–6^{(1)} |

=== Doubles: 27 (17 titles, 10 runner-ups) ===
| Legend $100,000 tournaments (3–4) $75,000 tournaments (1–0) $50/60,000 tournaments (5–2) $40,000 tournaments (2–0) $25,000 tournaments (3–4) $10,000 tournaments (3–0) | Finals by surface Hard (10–7) Clay (5–0) Grass (1–2) Carpet (1–1) |

| Result | W–L | Date | Tournament | Tier | Surface | Partner | Opponents | Score |
|---|---|---|---|---|---|---|---|---|
| Win | 1–0 | Nov 2006 | ITF Itajaí, Brazil | 10,000 | Clay | (Brazil) Teliana Pereira | (Brazil) Fernanda Hermenegildo (Slovakia) Monika Kochanová | 6–3, 6–3 |
| Win | 2–0 | Nov 2006 | ITF Córdoba, Argentina | 10,000 | Clay | (Brazil) Teliana Pereira | (Argentina) Florencia Molinero (Argentina) Veronika Spiegel | 7–5, 6–4 |
| Win | 3–0 | May 2007 | ITF Trivandrum, India | 10,000 | Clay | (United States) Lauren Albanese | (Italy) Nicole Clerico (Romania) Ágnes Szatmári | 3–6, 7–5, 6–0 |
| Win | 4–0 | Jul 2007 | ITF Stuttgart, Germany | 25,000 | Clay | (Belarus) Ekaterina Dzehalevich | (Croatia) Darija Jurak (Germany) Carmen Klaschka | 6–3, 6–2 |
| Win | 5–0 | Jul 2007 | ITF Les Contamines, France | 25,000 | Hard | (Russia) Anastasia Pavlyuchenkova | (Czech Republic) Petra Cetkovská (Czech Republic) Sandra Záhlavová | w/o |
| Loss | 5–1 | Aug 2007 | ITF Coimbra, Portugal | 25,000 | Hard | (Poland) Magdalena Kiszczyńska | (Hungary) Kira Nagy (Portugal) Neuza Silva | 3–6, 6–3, 7–5 |
| Loss | 5–2 | Oct 2007 | ITF Makinohara, Japan | 25,000 | Carpet | (United States) Lauren Albanese | (Japan) Airi Hagimoto (Japan) Sakiko Shimizu | 7–5, 6–3 |
| Win | 6–2 | Nov 2007 | Kunming Open, China | 50,000 | Hard | (Poland) Urszula Radwańska | (China) Han Xinyun (China) Xu Yifan | 6–4, 6–1 |
| Win | 7–2 | Apr 2008 | Torhout Ladies Open, Belgium | 75,000 | Hard | (Russia) Anastasia Pavlyuchenkova | (France) Stéphanie Cohen-Aloro (Tunisia) Selima Sfar | 6–4, 4–6, [10–8] |
| Loss | 7–3 | Feb 2009 | ITF Surprise, United States | 25,000 | Hard | (United States) Ahsha Rolle | (Argentina) Jorgelina Cravero (Russia) Ekaterina Lopes | 6–1, 6–1 |
| Loss | 7–4 | Mar 2009 | Clearwater Open, U.S. | 50,000 | Hard | (Italy) Maria Elena Camerin | (Czech Republic) Lucie Hradecká (Czech Republic) Michaela Paštiková | w/o |
| Win | 8–4 | Apr 2009 | Torhout Ladies Open, Belgium | 100,000 | Hard | (Netherlands) Michaëlla Krajicek | (Germany) Julia Görges (Austria) Sandra Klemenschits | 6–4, 6–0 |
| Loss | 8–5 | Oct 2010 | Torhout Ladies Open, Belgium | 100,000 | Hard | (Netherlands) Michaëlla Krajicek | (Switzerland) Timea Bacsinszky (Italy) Tathiana Garbin | 6–4, 6–2 |
| Win | 9–5 | Oct 2017 | Internationaux de Poitiers, France | 100,000 | Hard | (Switzerland) Belinda Bencic | (Romania) Mihaela Buzărnescu (Germany) Nicola Geuer | 7–6^{(7)}, 6–3 |
| Win | 10–5 | Feb 2018 | ITF Surprise, U.S. | 25,000 | Hard | (Japan) Misaki Doi | (United States) Jacqueline Cako (United States) Caitlin Whoriskey | 2–6, 6–3, [10–8] |
| Loss | 10–6 | Jun 2018 | Surbiton Trophy, UK | 100,000 | Grass | (Australia) Arina Rodionova | (Australia) Jessica Moore (Australia) Ellen Perez | 6–4, 5–7, [3–10] |
| Win | 11–6 | Feb 2019 | GB Pro-Series Shrewsbury, UK | 60,000 | Hard (i) | (Australia) Arina Rodionova | (United Kingdom) Freya Christie (Russia) Valeria Savinykh | 6–2, 7–5 |
| Win | 12–6 | May 2019 | Wiesbaden Open, Germany | 60,000 | Clay | (Russia) Anna Blinkova | (Australia) Jaimee Fourlis (Liechtenstein) Kathinka von Deichmann | 6–3, 4–6, [10–3] |
| Loss | 12–7 | Jun 2019 | Surbiton Trophy, UK | 100,000 | Grass | (United Kingdom) Heather Watson | (United States) Jennifer Brady (United States) Caroline Dolehide | 3–6, 4–6 |
| Loss | 12–8 | Feb 2020 | Midland Tennis Classic, U.S. | 100,000 | Hard (i) | (Russia) Valeria Savinykh | (United States) Maria Sanchez (United States) Caroline Dolehide | 3–6, 4–6 |
| Loss | 12–9 | Mar 2022 | Open de Touraine, France | 25,000 | Hard (i) | (Germany) Mona Barthel | (United Kingdom) Emily Appleton (United Kingdom) Ali Collins | 6–2, 4–6, [6–10] |
| Loss | 12–10 | Oct 2022 | Challenger de Saguenay, Canada | 60,000 | Hard (i) | (United States) Catherine Harrison | (Netherlands) Arianne Hartono (Australia) Olivia Tjandramulia | 7–5, 6–7^{(3)}, [8–10] |
| Win | 13–10 | Feb 2023 | Porto Indoor, Portugal | 40,000 | Hard (i) | (Switzerland) Céline Naef | (France) Alice Robbe (Croatia) Tara Würth | 6–1, 6–4 |
| Win | 14–10 | Feb 2023 | AK Ladies Open, Germany | 60,000 | Carpet (i) | (Belgium) Greet Minnen | (United Kingdom) Freya Christie (United Kingdom) Ali Collins | 6–1, 6–3 |
| Win | 15–10 | Mar 2023 | Trnava Indoor, Slovakia | 60,000 | Hard (i) | (Belgium) Greet Minnen | (Greece) Sapfo Sakellaridi (Slovakia) Radka Zelníčková | 6–4, 6–4 |
| Win | 16–10 | Apr 2023 | Open de Seine-et-Marne, France | 60,000 | Hard | (Belgium) Greet Minnen | (United Kingdom) Jodie Burrage (Turkey) Berfu Cengiz | 6–4, 6–4 |
| Win | 17–10 | Jun 2023 | Surbiton Trophy, UK | 100,000 | Grass | (United States) Sophie Chang | (United Kingdom) Alicia Barnett (United Kingdom) Olivia Nicholls | 6–4, 6–1 |

== Top 10 wins ==
| # | Player | Rank | Event | Surface | Rd | Score | YWR |
|---|---|---|---|---|---|---|---|
2010
| 1. | (Poland) Agnieszka Radwańska | No. 9 | Fed Cup | Hard (i) | 1R | 1–6, 7–6^{(8–6)}, 7–5 | |
2011
| 2. | (China) Li Na | No. 7 | Dubai Championships, UAE | Hard | 2R | 6–7^{(6–8)}, 7–6^{(8–6)}, 6–2 | |
2012
| 3. | (France) Marion Bartoli | No. 10 | Stanford Classic, United States | Hard | QF | 6–3, 6–2 | |
2013
| 4. | (Czech Republic) Petra Kvitová | No. 8 | Eastbourne International, UK | Grass | 2R | 3–6, 6–4, 7–5 | |
| 5. | (Russia) Maria Kirilenko | No. 10 | Eastbourne International, UK | Grass | QF | 6–2, 1–6, 7–5 | |

=== Longest winning streaks ===
9–match (12 with qualifiers) singles winning streak (2009–10)

| # | Tournament | Category | Start date | Surface | Rd | Opponent | Rank | Score | YWR |
|---|---|---|---|---|---|---|---|---|---|
| – | Luxembourg Open, Luxembourg | WTA International | 19 October 2009 | Hard (i) | SF | (Switzerland) Timea Bacsinszky | No. 70 | 6–3, 2–6, 5–7 | No. 20 |
| 1 | Tournament of Champions, Indonesia | Year-end championships | 2 November 2009 | Hard (i) | RR | (Japan) Kimiko Date-Krumm | No. 101 | 7–6^{(7–5)}, 6–3 | No. 18 |
| 2 | Auckland Open, New Zealand | WTA International | 4 January 2010 | Hard | 1R | (Germany) Julia Görges | No. 77 | 6–3, 7–5 | No. 16 |
| 3 | Auckland Open, New Zealand | WTA International | 4 January 2010 | Hard | 2R | (Romania) Raluca Olaru | No. 72 | 6–2, 6–2 | No. 16 |
| 4 | Auckland Open, New Zealand | WTA International | 4 January 2010 | Hard | QF | (Japan) Kimiko Date-Krumm (WC) | No. 69 | 6–2, 6–2 | No. 16 |
| 5 | Auckland Open, New Zealand | WTA International | 4 January 2010 | Hard | SF | (Israel) Shahar Pe'er | No. 30 | 6–4, 7–5 | No. 16 |
| 6 | Auckland Open, New Zealand | WTA International | 4 January 2010 | Hard | F | (Italy) Flavia Pennetta (1) | No. 12 | 6–3, 6–2 | No. 16 |
| – | Australian Open, Australia | Grand Slam | 18 January 2010 | Hard | Q1 | (Japan) Yurika Sema | No. 149 | 4–6, 6–0, 7–5 | No. 16 |
| – | Australian Open, Australia | Grand Slam | 18 January 2010 | Hard | Q2 | (United Kingdom) Naomi Cavaday | No. 204 | 6–0, 6–1 | No. 16 |
| – | Australian Open, Australia | Grand Slam | 18 January 2010 | Hard | Q3 | (Spain) Lourdes Domínguez Lino | No. 135 | 6–0, 6–0 | No. 16 |
| 7 | Australian Open, Australia | Grand Slam | 18 January 2010 | Hard | 1R | (Romania) Alexandra Dulgheru | No. 53 | 1–6, 7–5, 10–8 | No. 16 |
| 8 | Australian Open, Australia | Grand Slam | 18 January 2010 | Hard | 2R | (Italy) Flavia Pennetta (12) | No. 12 | 7–6^{(7–2)}, 6–1 | No. 16 |
| 9 | Australian Open, Australia | Grand Slam | 18 January 2010 | Hard | 3R | (Italy) Sara Errani | No. 46 | 6–1, 6–7^{(4–7)}, 6–3 | No. 16 |
| – | Australian Open, Australia | Grand Slam | 18 January 2010 | Hard | 4R | (Belgium) Justine Henin (WC) | N/R | 6–7^{(3–7)}, 6–1, 3–6 | No. 16 |
