= 2018 Zhengzhou Women's Tennis Open =

- Date: 16–22 April
- Edition: 5th
- Category: WTA 125K series
- Prize money: $125,000
- Surface: Hard
- Location: Zhengzhou, China

Champions

Singles
- (China) Zheng Saisai

Doubles
- (China) Duan Yingying / (China) Wang Yafan
← 2017 ·	Zhengzhou Women's Tennis Open	· 2019 →

The 2018 Zhengzhou Women's Tennis Open was a professional tennis tournament played on outdoor hard courts. It was the fifth edition of the tournament and part of the 2018 WTA 125K series, offering a total of $125,000 in prize money. It took place in Zhengzhou, China, on 16–22 April 2018.

== Singles main draw entrants ==
=== Seeds ===
Country	Player	Rank^{1}	Seed
CHN	~~Zhang Shuai~~	~~31~~	~~1~~
CHN	Peng Shuai	37	2
THA	Luksika Kumkhum	94	3
CHN	Wang Yafan	98	4
CHN	Duan Yingying	103	5
BEL	Yanina Wickmayer	106	6
JPN	Nao Hibino	122	7
CHN	Zhu Lin	129	8

- ^{1} Rankings as of 9 April 2018.

=== Other entrants ===
The following players received wildcards into the singles main draw:

- (China) Peng Shuai
- (China) Tian Ran
- (China) Wang Xiyu
- (China) Yang Zhaoxuan
- (China) Yuan Yue

The following players received entry from the qualifying draw:

- (Japan) Mai Minokoshi
- (India) Ankita Raina
- (Japan) Ayano Shimizu
- (China) Xun Fangying

The following players received entry as Lucky Losers:

- (China) You Xiaodi
- (China) Zhang Kailin

=== Withdrawals ===
- (China) Lu Jingjing → replaced by (China) Zhang Kailin
- (China) Zhang Shuai → replaced by (China) You Xiaodi

== Doubles entrants ==
=== Seeds ===
Country	Player	Country	Player	Rank^{1}	Seed
JPN	Eri Hozumi	CHN	Yang Zhaoxuan	86	1
JPN	Nao Hibino	CHN	Zheng Saisai	149	2
GBR	Naomi Broady	BEL	Yanina Wickmayer	157	3
CHN	Duan Yingying	CHN	Wang Yafan	220	4

- ^{1} Rankings as of 9 April 2018.

=== Other entrants ===
The following pair received a wildcard into the main draw:

- (China) Tian Ran / (China) Zhang Kailin

== Champions ==
=== Singles ===
- (China) Zheng Saisai def. (China) Wang Yafan 5–7, 6–2, 6–1

=== Doubles ===
- (China) Duan Yingying / (China) Wang Yafan def. (United Kingdom) Naomi Broady / (Belgium) Yanina Wickmayer 7–6^{(7–5)}, 6–3
