= 2018 Zhengzhou Women's Tennis Open – Singles =

Singles
- 2018 Zhengzhou Women's Tennis Open

Final
- Champion: (China) Zheng Saisai
- Runner-up: (China) Wang Yafan
- Score: 5–7, 6–2, 6–1

Events
Singles	Doubles
← 2017 ·	Zhengzhou Women's Tennis Open	· 2019 →

Wang Qiang was the defending champion, but chose not to participate.

Zheng Saisai won the title after defeating Wang Yafan 5–7, 6–2, 6–1 in the final.

== Seeds ==
1. (China) Zhang Shuai (withdrew)
2. (China) Peng Shuai (first round)
3. (Thailand) Luksika Kumkhum (first round)
4. (China) Wang Yafan (final)
5. (China) Duan Yingying (second round)
6. (Belgium) Yanina Wickmayer (semifinals)
7. (Japan) Nao Hibino (first round)
8. (China) Zhu Lin (quarterfinals)

== Draw ==
=== Key ===
- Q = Qualifier
- WC = Wild card
- LL = Lucky loser
- Alt = Alternate
- SE = Special exempt
- PR = Protected ranking
- ITF = ITF entry
- JE = Junior exempt
- w/o = Walkover
- r = Retired
- d = Defaulted
- SR = Special ranking

=== Finals ===
Semifinals
6	(Belgium) Yanina Wickmayer	2	6	2
4	(China) Wang Yafan	6	3	6
(China) Han Xinyun	5	0
(China) Zheng Saisai	7	6

Final
4	(China) Wang Yafan	7	2	1
(China) Zheng Saisai	5	6	6

=== Top half ===
First round
LL	(China) X You	6	5	6
WC	(China) Y Yuan	3	7	2
WC	(China) R Tian	0	2
Q	(Japan) M Minokoshi	6	6
WC	(China) Xiy Wang	6	7
(United Kingdom) N Broady	4	5
(Russia) V Zvonareva	3	4
6	(Belgium) Y Wickmayer	6	6
4	(China) Y Wang	6	6
(Japan) J Namigata	3	1
(Uzbekistan) S Sharipova	4	6	7^{7}
(Thailand) Pe Plipuech	6	2	6^{2}
(Japan) M Imanishi	6	7
(Russia) V Diatchenko	4	5
(China) X Gao	2	2
8	(China) L Zhu	6	6

Second round
LL	(China) X You	5	1^{r}
Q	(Japan) M Minokoshi	7	4
WC	(China) Xiy Wang	3	1
6	(Belgium) Y Wickmayer	6	6
4	(China) Y Wang	6	6
(Uzbekistan) S Sharipova	1	2
(Japan) M Imanishi	1	3
8	(China) L Zhu	6	6

Quarterfinals
Q	(Japan) M Minokoshi	1	3
6	(Belgium) Y Wickmayer	6	6
4	(China) Y Wang	6	7^{7}
8	(China) L Zhu	4	6^{5}

Semifinals
6	(Belgium) Y Wickmayer	2	6	2
4	(China) Y Wang	6	3	6

=== Bottom half ===
First round
7	(Japan) N Hibino	6	3	3
(China) X Han	2	6	6
(South Korea) S-j Jang	6	6
Q	(Japan) A Shimizu	2	4
WC	(China) Z Yang	3	3
(Japan) E Hozumi	6	6
(United States) D Lao	7^{7}	7^{12}
3	(Thailand) L Kumkhum	6^{0}	6^{10}
5	(China) Y Duan	6	5	6
Q	(India) A Raina	3	7	3
(China) Jia Lu	6	6
LL	(China) K Zhang	2	4
Q	(China) F Xun	0	0
(China) F Liu	6	6
(China) S Zheng	7^{10}	6
2/WC	(China) S Peng	6^{8}	2

Second round
(China) X Han	6	6
(South Korea) S-j Jang	3	3
(Japan) E Hozumi	3	3
(United States) D Lao	6	6
5	(China) Y Duan	2	6	3
(China) Jia Lu	6	4	6
(China) F Liu	6	4	0
(China) S Zheng	2	6	6

Quarterfinals
(China) X Han	6	6
(United States) D Lao	1	2
(China) Jia Lu	0	0
(China) S Zheng	6	6

Semifinals
(China) X Han	5	0
(China) S Zheng	7	6

== Qualifying ==
=== Seeds ===
1. (India) Ankita Raina (qualified)
2. (Japan) Ayano Shimizu (qualified)
3. (Russia) Viktoria Kamenskaya (qualifying competition)
4. (China) Xun Fangying (qualified)
5. (Japan) Mai Minokoshi (qualified)
6. (China) Guo Hanyu (first round)
7. (Hong Kong) Zhang Ling (qualifying competition)
8. (China) Zhang Kailin (qualifying competition, lucky loser)

=== Qualifiers ===
1. (India) Ankita Raina
2. (Japan) Ayano Shimizu
3. (Japan) Mai Minokoshi
4. (China) Xun Fangying

=== Lucky losers ===
1. (China) You Xiaodi
2. (China) Zhang Kailin

=== Qualifying draw ===
==== First qualifier ====
First round
1	(India) Ankita Raina	6	6
(Japan) Hiroko Kuwata	3	1
WC	(China) Wang Meiling	6	0	5
7	(Hong Kong) Zhang Ling	1	6	7

Qualifying competition
1	(India) Ankita Raina	7^{7}	6^{4}	6
7	(Hong Kong) Zhang Ling	6^{3}	7^{7}	3

==== Second qualifier ====
First round
2	(Japan) Ayano Shimizu	6	6
WC	(China) Li Denglin	1	3
(China) You Xiaodi	6	3	6
6	(China) Guo Hanyu	2	6	4

Qualifying competition
2	(Japan) Ayano Shimizu	6	6
(China) You Xiaodi	2	4

==== Third qualifier ====
First round
3	(Russia) Viktoria Kamenskaya	7^{8}	6
(China) Zhang Yuxuan	6^{6}	2
(Australia) Olivia Tjandramulia	1	7	0
5	(Japan) Mai Minokoshi	6	5	6

Qualifying competition
3	(Russia) Viktoria Kamenskaya	4	2
5	(Japan) Mai Minokoshi	6	6

==== Fourth qualifier ====
First round
4	(China) Xun Fangying	6	6
(China) Sun Xuliu	3	4
(China) Kang Jiaqi	6	6^{5}	2
8	(China) Zhang Kailin	4	7^{7}	6

Qualifying competition
4	(China) Xun Fangying	6	6
8	(China) Zhang Kailin	4	3
