= 2017 Zhengzhou Women's Tennis Open – Singles =

Singles
- 2017 Zhengzhou Women's Tennis Open

Final
- Champion: (China) Wang Qiang
- Runner-up: (China) Peng Shuai
- Score: 3–6, 7–6^{(7–3)}, 1–1 ret.

Events
| Singles | Doubles |
| ← 2016 · | Zhengzhou Women's Tennis Open | · 2018 → |

Anastasia Pivovarova was the defending champion, but chose not to participate.

Wang Qiang won the title after her opponent Peng Shuai retired in the final, with the score at 3–6, 7–6^{(7–3)}, 1–1.

== Seeds ==
1. (China) Peng Shuai (final, retired)
2. (China) Wang Qiang (champion)
3. (China) Duan Yingying (semifinals)
4. (Japan) Nao Hibino (quarterfinals)
5. (China) Zheng Saisai (semifinals)
6. (Japan) Kurumi Nara (second round, retired)
7. (China) Han Xinyun (first round)
8. (China) Liu Fangzhou (quarterfinals)

== Draw ==
=== Key ===
- Q = Qualifier
- WC = Wild card
- LL = Lucky loser
- Alt = Alternate
- SE = Special exempt
- PR = Protected ranking
- ITF = ITF entry
- JE = Junior exempt
- w/o = Walkover
- r = Retired
- d = Defaulted
- SR = Special ranking

=== Finals ===
Semifinals
1/WC | (China) Peng Shuai | 7^{7} | 7^{7}
5 | (China) Zheng Saisai | 6^{2} | 6^{5}
3 | (China) Duan Yingying | 6^{11} | 2
2 | (China) Wang Qiang | 7^{13} | 6

Final
1/WC | (China) Peng Shuai | 6 | 6^{3} | 1^{r}
2 | (China) Wang Qiang | 3 | 7^{7} | 1

=== Top half ===
First round
1/WC | (China) S Peng | 6 | 6
(Japan) S Aoyama | 1 | 1
(Japan) M Kato | 6^{4} | 0
(Japan) R Sawayanagi | 7^{7} | 6
(Japan) M Hibi | 2 | 4
(Japan) S Akita | 6 | 6
(Kazakhstan) Z Diyas | 6 | 6
7 | (China) X Han | 2 | 0
4 | (Japan) N Hibino | 6 | 6
(Japan) A Omae | 1 | 2
(Japan) E Hozumi | 6 | 6
Q | (China) H Guo | 1 | 3
Q | (China) J Kang | 4 | 6 | 4
(Uzbekistan) S Sharipova | 6 | 3 | 6
(China) J Lu | 2 | 2
5 | (China) S Zheng | 6 | 6

Second round
1/WC | (China) S Peng | 6 | 6
(Japan) R Sawayanagi | 1 | 4
(Japan) S Akita | 2 | 4
(Kazakhstan) Z Diyas | 6 | 6
4 | (Japan) N Hibino | 6 | 6
(Japan) E Hozumi | 3 | 2
(Uzbekistan) S Sharipova | 2 | 6 | 3
5 | (China) S Zheng | 6 | 4 | 6

Quarterfinals
1/WC | (China) S Peng | 6 | 6
(Kazakhstan) Z Diyas | 3 | 3
4 | (Japan) N Hibino | 3 | 4
5 | (China) S Zheng | 6 | 6

Semifinals
1/WC | (China) S Peng | 7^{7} | 7^{7}
5 | (China) S Zheng | 6^{2} | 6^{5}

=== Bottom half ===
First round
6 | (Japan) K Nara | 6 | 7
(China) L Zhu | 4 | 5
(South Korea) N-l Han | 4 | 1
(South Korea) S-j Jang | 6 | 6
WC | (China) C Liu | 6^{2} | 6^{4}
(Australia) Ar Rodionova | 7^{7} | 7^{7}
Q | (Thailand) Pe Plipuech | 1 | 1
3 | (China) Y Duan | 6 | 6
8 | (China) F Liu | 7^{7} | 6
Q | (Thailand) Vara Wongteanchai | 6^{4} | 2
WC | (China) Z Yang | 6 | 6
WC | (China) H Tang | 1 | 2
(Greece) V Grammatikopoulou | 6 | 6
WC | (China) Y Xu | 1 | 3
(Japan) H Kuwata | 1 | 1
2 | (China) Q Wang | 6 | 6

Second round
6 | (Japan) K Nara | 5 | 0^{r}
(South Korea) S-j Jang | 7 | 4
(Australia) Ar Rodionova | 6 | 4 | 6^{5}
3 | (China) Y Duan | 4 | 6 | 7^{7}
8 | (China) F Liu | 6 | 6
WC | (China) Z Yang | 1 | 4
(Greece) V Grammatikopoulou | 6 | 5 | 2
2 | (China) Q Wang | 4 | 7 | 6

Quarterfinals
(South Korea) S-j Jang | 4 | 5
3 | (China) Y Duan | 6 | 7
8 | (China) F Liu | 2 | 3
2 | (China) Q Wang | 6 | 6

Semifinals
3 | (China) Y Duan | 6^{11} | 2
2 | (China) Q Wang | 7^{13} | 6

=== Preliminary match ===
| Preliminary match |
| (Croatia) Jana Fett | 6 | 5 | 1 |
| (Japan) Shiho Akita | 2 | 7 | 6 |

- Due to the WTA mistakenly accepting too many players into the main draw, the two lowest ranked players in the draw, Jana Fett and Shiho Akita, were forced to play a preliminary match for a spot in the main draw. The winner of the match received a spot in the main draw, whereas the loser will receive one ranking point and first round prize money.

== Qualifying ==
=== Seeds ===
1. (Israel) Julia Glushko (qualifying competition)
2. (United States) Jacqueline Cako (qualifying competition)
3. (Japan) Kyōka Okamura (qualifying competition)
4. (Thailand) Peangtarn Plipuech (qualified)
5. (Thailand) Varatchaya Wongteanchai (qualified)
6. (China) Gao Xinyu (qualifying competition)
7. (China) Xun Fangying (first round)
8. (China) Guo Hanyu (qualified)

=== Qualifiers ===
1. (Thailand) Varatchaya Wongteanchai
2. (China) Guo Hanyu
3. (China) Kang Jiaqi
4. (Thailand) Peangtarn Plipuech

=== Qualifying draw ===
==== First qualifier ====
First round
1 | (Israel) Julia Glushko | 2 | 6 | 6
(Japan) Miharu Imanishi | 6 | 2 | 1
(China) Zhang Yuxuan | 5 | 4
5 | (Thailand) Varatchaya Wongteanchai | 7 | 6

Qualifying competition
1 | (Israel) Julia Glushko | 6 | 6^{2} | 1
5 | (Thailand) Varatchaya Wongteanchai | 4 | 7^{7} | 6

==== Second qualifier ====
First round
2 | (United States) Jacqueline Cako | 6 | 3 | 6
WC | (Singapore) Stefanie Tan | 3 | 6 | 1
(China) Lu Jiaxi | 7 | 6^{6} | 3
8 | (China) Guo Hanyu | 5 | 7^{8} | 6

Qualifying competition
2 | (United States) Jacqueline Cako | 4 | 6 | 4
8 | (China) Guo Hanyu | 6 | 3 | 6

==== Third qualifier ====
First round
3 | (Japan) Kyōka Okamura | 7 | 6
(Russia) Valeria Savinykh | 5 | 2
(China) Kang Jiaqi | 7 | 6
7 | (China) Xun Fangying | 5 | 4

Qualifying competition
3 | (Japan) Kyōka Okamura | 3 | 2
(China) Kang Jiaqi | 6 | 6

==== Fourth qualifier ====
First round
4 | (Thailand) Peangtarn Plipuech | 6 | 4 | 6
WC | (China) Wang Xiyu | 4 | 6 | 4
(China) Sun Xuliu | 6^{5} | 2
6 | (China) Gao Xinyu | 7^{7} | 6

Qualifying competition
4 | (Thailand) Peangtarn Plipuech | 6 | 2 | 6
6 | (China) Gao Xinyu | 1 | 6 | 1
