= 2016 Jinyuan Cup – Singles =

Singles
- 2016 Jinyuan Cup

Final
- Champion: (Russia) Anastasia Pivovarova
- Runner-up: (China) Lu Jingjing
- Score: 6–4, 6–4

Events
| Singles | Doubles |
| ← 2015 · | Jinyuan Cup | · 2017 → |

Wang Yafan was the defending champion, but she chose to participate in Strasbourg instead.

Anastasia Pivovarova won the title, defeating Lu Jingjing in the final, 6–4, 6–4.

== Seeds ==
1. (South Korea) Jang Su-jeong (second round)
2. (China) Liu Fangzhou (first round)
3. (Russia) Anastasia Pivovarova (champion)
4. (China) Lu Jingjing (final)
5. (Belarus) Aryna Sabalenka (quarterfinals)
6. (United States) Danielle Lao (quarterfinals)
7. (China) Peng Shuai (quarterfinals)
8. (United States) Lauren Albanese (first round)

== Main draw ==
=== Key ===
- Q = Qualifier
- WC = Wild card
- LL = Lucky loser
- Alt = Alternate
- SE = Special exempt
- PR = Protected ranking
- ITF = ITF entry
- JE = Junior exempt
- w/o = Walkover
- r = Retired
- d = Defaulted
- SR = Special ranking

=== Finals ===
Semifinals
Q | (South Korea) Kim Na-ri | 6 | 5 | 2
3 | (Russia) Anastasia Pivovarova | 2 | 7 | 6
4 | (China) Lu Jingjing | 6 | 6
(Bulgaria) Aleksandrina Naydenova | 4 | 4

Final
3 | (Russia) Anastasia Pivovarova | 6 | 6
4 | (China) Lu Jingjing | 4 | 4

=== Top half ===
First round
1 | (South Korea) S-j Jang | 6 | 6
(China) X Gao | 4 | 4
(Thailand) Pe Plipuech | 6 | 4 | 3
Q | (South Korea) N-r Kim | 1 | 6 | 6
(United States) J Cako | 6 | 6
(Slovakia) M Hončová | 2 | 1
(Russia) A Tarasova | 5 | 2
6 | (United States) D Lao | 7 | 6
3 | (Russia) A Pivovarova | 5 | 6 | 6
(China) R Tian | 7 | 1 | 1
(Hong Kong) L Zhang | 6 | 4 | 2
WC | (China) J Kang | 3 | 6 | 6
(Serbia) N Stojanović | 6 | 5 | 6
WC | (China) H Tang | 0 | 7 | 2
Q | (China) S Feng | 3 | 6^{4}
5 | (Belarus) A Sabalenka | 6 | 7^{7}

Second round
1 | (South Korea) S-j Jang | 1 | 4
Q | (South Korea) N-r Kim | 6 | 6
(United States) J Cako | 4 | 7 | 4
6 | (United States) D Lao | 6 | 5 | 6
3 | (Russia) A Pivovarova | 6 | 6
WC | (China) J Kang | 1 | 2
(Serbia) N Stojanović | 4 | 6 | 4
5 | (Belarus) A Sabalenka | 6 | 4 | 6

Quarterfinals
Q | (South Korea) N-r Kim | 6 | 6
6 | (United States) D Lao | 1 | 3
3 | (Russia) A Pivovarova | 6 | 4 | 6
5 | (Belarus) A Sabalenka | 2 | 6 | 4

Semifinals
Q | (South Korea) N-r Kim | 6 | 5 | 2
3 | (Russia) A Pivovarova | 2 | 7 | 6

=== Bottom half ===
First round
7 | (China) S Peng | 3 | 6 | 6
(China) D Zhao | 6 | 2 | 4
Q | (China) S Guo | 5 | 7^{7} | 6
Q | (China) Y Wang | 7 | 6^{3} | 3
(China) F Xun | 2 | 2
(China) A Gai | 6 | 6
(China) X You | 3 | 2
4 | (China) J Lu | 6 | 6
8 | (United States) L Albanese | 4 | 3
(Bulgaria) A Naydenova | 6 | 6
(China) X Sun | 6 | 6
(Russia) E Yashina | 3 | 3
(Thailand) N Lertpitaksinchai | 6 | 6
(Russia) Y Sizikova | 4 | 4
(Uzbekistan) A Amanmuradova | 6 | 6
2 | (China) F Liu | 2 | 3

Second round
7 | (China) S Peng | 6 | 6
Q | (China) S Guo | 3 | 0
(China) A Gai | 0 | 6 | 2
4 | (China) J Lu | 6 | 3 | 6
(Bulgaria) A Naydenova | 6 | 6
(China) X Sun | 1 | 4
(Thailand) N Lertpitaksinchai | 1 | 4
(Uzbekistan) A Amanmuradova | 6 | 6

Quarterfinals
7 | (China) S Peng | 7^{13} | 6^{3} | 3
4 | (China) J Lu | 6^{11} | 7^{7} | 6
(Bulgaria) A Naydenova | 4 | 6 | 6
(Uzbekistan) A Amanmuradova | 6 | 4 | 2

Semifinals
4 | (China) J Lu | 6 | 6
(Bulgaria) A Naydenova | 4 | 4
