= 2017 Zhengzhou Women's Tennis Open – Doubles =

Doubles
- 2017 Zhengzhou Women's Tennis Open

Final
- Champion: (China) Han Xinyun (China) Zhu Lin
- Runner-up: (United States) Jacqueline Cako (Israel) Julia Glushko
- Score: 7–5, 6–1

Events
Singles	Doubles
← 2016 ·	Zhengzhou Women's Tennis Open	· 2018 →

Xun Fangying and You Xiaodi were the defending champions, but both players chose not to participate.

Han Xinyun and Zhu Lin won the title after defeating Jacqueline Cako and Julia Glushko 7–5, 6–1 in the final.

== Seeds ==
1. (Japan) Shuko Aoyama / (China) Xu Yifan (quarterfinals)
2. (Japan) Eri Hozumi / (Japan) Miyu Kato (quarterfinals)
3. (China) Liu Chang / (China) Zheng Saisai (first round)
4. (Japan) Hiroko Kuwata / (Japan) Akiko Omae (first round)

== Draw ==
=== Key ===
- Q = Qualifier
- WC = Wild card
- LL = Lucky loser
- Alt = Alternate
- SE = Special exempt
- PR = Protected ranking
- ITF = ITF entry
- JE = Junior exempt
- w/o = Walkover
- r = Retired
- d = Defaulted
- SR = Special ranking

First round
1	(Japan) S Aoyama (China) Y Xu	6	6
(China) X Sun (China) Y Wang	1	2
(China) X Han (China) L Zhu	6	6
(China) Jia Lu (Thailand) V Wongteanchai	2	2
3	(China) C Liu (China) S Zheng	6^{3}	7	[7]
(Australia) Ar Rodionova (Russia) V Savinykh	7^{7}	5	[10]
(China) X Gao (China) H Tang	6	6
(China) W Liu (China) Z Yang	4	2
(Greece) V Grammatikopoulou (Uzbekistan) S Sharipova	7^{7}	2	[11]
(Thailand) P Plipuech (Japan) K Takahata	6^{5}	6	[13]
(Australia) M Adamczak (Chinese Taipei) C-w Chan	6	6
4	(Japan) H Kuwata (Japan) A Omae	2	3
(United States) J Cako (Israel) J Glushko	7	6^{2}	[10]
(China) Jin Lu (China) Q Ye	5	7^{7}	[5]
(China) H Guo (Singapore) S Tan	6^{3}	5
2	(Japan) E Hozumi (Japan) M Kato	7^{7}	7

Quarterfinals
1	(Japan) S Aoyama (China) Y Xu	3	7	[9]
(China) X Han (China) L Zhu	6	5	[11]
(Australia) Ar Rodionova (Russia) V Savinykh	6	6
(China) X Gao (China) H Tang	3	4
(Thailand) P Plipuech (Japan) K Takahata	6^{2}	7^{7}	[6]
(Australia) M Adamczak (Chinese Taipei) C-w Chan	7^{7}	6^{4}	[10]
(United States) J Cako (Israel) J Glushko	7	6
2	(Japan) E Hozumi (Japan) M Kato	5	3

Semifinals
(China) X Han (China) L Zhu	6	6
(Australia) Ar Rodionova (Russia) V Savinykh	4	2
(Australia) M Adamczak (Chinese Taipei) C-w Chan	6	5	[4]
(United States) J Cako (Israel) J Glushko	2	7	[10]

Final
(China) X Han (China) L Zhu	7	6
(United States) J Cako (Israel) J Glushko	5	1
