= 2016 Jinyuan Cup =

- Date: 16–22 May
- Edition: 3rd
- Category: ITF Women's Circuit
- Prize money: $50,000
- Surface: Hard
- Location: Zhengzhou, China

Champions

Singles
- (Russia) Anastasia Pivovarova

Doubles
- (China) Xun Fangying / (China) You Xiaodi
| Jinyuan Cup | · 2017 → |

The 2016 Jinyuan Cup was a professional tennis tournament played on outdoor hard courts. It was the third edition of the tournament and part of the 2016 ITF Women's Circuit, offering a total of $50,000 in prize money. It took place in Zhengzhou, China, on 16–22 May 2016.

== Singles main draw entrants ==
=== Seeds ===
| Country | Player | Rank^{1} | Seed |
|---|---|---|---|
| KOR | Jang Su-jeong | 182 | 1 |
| CHN | Liu Fangzhou | 183 | 2 |
| RUS | Anastasia Pivovarova | 232 | 3 |
| CHN | Lu Jingjing | 234 | 4 |
| BLR | Aryna Sabalenka | 256 | 5 |
| USA | Danielle Lao | 277 | 6 |
| CHN | Peng Shuai | 279 | 7 |
| USA | Lauren Albanese | 283 | 8 |

- ^{1} Rankings as of 9 May 2016.

=== Other entrants ===
The following players received wildcards into the singles main draw:

- (China) Kang Jiaqi
- (China) Tang Haochen

The following players received entry from the qualifying draw:

- (China) Feng Shuo
- (China) Guo Shanshan
- (South Korea) Kim Na-ri
- (China) Wang Yan

== Champions ==
=== Singles ===
- (Russia) Anastasia Pivovarova def. (China) Lu Jingjing, 6–4, 6–4

=== Doubles ===
- (China) Xun Fangying / (China) You Xiaodi def. (Uzbekistan) Akgul Amanmuradova / (Slovakia) Michaela Hončová, 1–6, 6–2, [10–7]
