= 2017 Zhengzhou Women's Tennis Open =

- Date: 17–23 April
- Edition: 4th
- Category: WTA 125K series
- Prize money: $125,000
- Surface: Hard, indoor
- Location: Zhengzhou, China

Champions

Singles
- (China) Wang Qiang

Doubles
- (China) Han Xinyun / (China) Zhu Lin
← 2016 ·	Zhengzhou Women's Tennis Open	· 2018 →

The 2017 Zhengzhou Women's Tennis Open was a professional tennis tournament played on indoor hard courts. It was the fourth edition of the tournament and part of the 2017 WTA 125K series, offering a total of $125,000 in prize money. It took place in Zhengzhou, China, on 17–23 April 2017.

== Singles main draw entrants ==
=== Seeds ===
Country	Player	Rank^{1}	Seed
CHN	Peng Shuai	40	1
CHN	Wang Qiang	62	2
CHN	Duan Yingying	63	3
JPN	Nao Hibino	77	4
CHN	Zheng Saisai	88	5
JPN	Kurumi Nara	95	6
CHN	Han Xinyun	120	7
CHN	Liu Fangzhou	137	8

- ^{1} Rankings as of 10 April 2017.

=== Other entrants ===
The following players received wildcards into the singles main draw:

- (China) Liu Chang
- (China) Peng Shuai
- (China) Tang Haochen
- (China) Xu Yifan
- (China) Yang Zhaoxuan

The following players received entry from the qualifying draw:

- (China) Guo Hanyu
- (China) Kang Jiaqi
- (Thailand) Peangtarn Plipuech
- (Thailand) Varatchaya Wongteanchai

== Doubles entrants ==
=== Seeds ===
Country	Player	Country	Player	Rank^{1}	Seed
JPN	Shuko Aoyama	CHN	Xu Yifan	69	1
JPN	Eri Hozumi	JPN	Miyu Kato	74	2
CHN	Liu Chang	CHN	Zheng Saisai	209	3
JPN	Hiroko Kuwata	JPN	Akiko Omae	225	4

- ^{1} Rankings as of 10 April 2017.

== Champions ==
=== Singles ===
- (China) Wang Qiang def. (China) Peng Shuai, 3–6, 7–6^{(7–3)}, 1–1 ret.

=== Doubles ===
- (China) Han Xinyun / (China) Zhu Lin def. (United States) Jacqueline Cako / (Israel) Julia Glushko, 7–5, 6–1
