= 2019 Zhengzhou Open – Doubles =

Doubles
- 2019 Zhengzhou Open

Final
- Champions: (United States) Nicole Melichar (Czech Republic) Květa Peschke
- Runners-up: (Belgium) Yanina Wickmayer (Slovenia) Tamara Zidanšek
- Score: 6–1, 7–6^{(7–2)}

Events
Singles	Doubles
← 2018 ·	Zhengzhou Open	· 2023 →

Duan Yingying and Wang Yafan were the defending champions, but Wang chose to compete in Nanchang instead. Duan played alongside Zheng Saisai, but lost in the first round to Lesley Pattinama Kerkhove and Bibiane Schoofs.

Nicole Melichar and Květa Peschke won the title, defeating Yanina Wickmayer and Tamara Zidanšek in the final, 6–1, 7–6^{(7–2)}.

== Seeds ==
1. (United States) Nicole Melichar / (Czech Republic) Květa Peschke (champions)
2. (China) Duan Yingying / (China) Zheng Saisai (first round)
3. (Croatia) Darija Jurak / (United States) Alison Riske (quarterfinals)
4. (Japan) Shuko Aoyama / (China) Yang Zhaoxuan (first round)

== Draw ==
=== Key ===
- Q = Qualifier
- WC = Wild card
- LL = Lucky loser
- Alt = Alternate
- SE = Special exempt
- PR = Protected ranking
- ITF = ITF entry
- JE = Junior exempt
- w/o = Walkover
- r = Retired
- d = Defaulted
- SR = Special ranking

=== Draw ===
First round
1	(United States) N Melichar (Czech Republic) K Peschke	6	6
(Chinese Taipei) P-h Chen (Chinese Taipei) Y-c Hsieh	2	3
(United States) K Christian (Canada) S Fichman	6^{4}	4
(Poland) A Rosolska (Australia) A Tomljanović	7^{7}	6
3	(Croatia) D Jurak (United States) A Riske	6	6
(France) F Ferro (France) C Paquet	1	1
(Norway) U Eikeri (Brazil) L Pigossi	5	2
(United States) D Krawczyk (Australia) E Perez	7	6
WC	(China) H Guo (China) Y Yuan	2	3
(United States) S Kenin (United States) A Muhammad	6	6
(Belgium) Y Wickmayer (Slovenia) T Zidanšek	6	6
4	(Japan) S Aoyama (China) Z Yang	1	0
(Sweden) C Lister (Czech Republic) R Voráčová	3	4
(Australia) M Adamczak (China) X Han	6	6
(Netherlands) L Pattinama Kerkhove (Netherlands) B Schoofs	6	2	[10]
2	(China) Y Duan (China) S Zheng	4	6	[8]

Quarterfinals
1	(United States) N Melichar (Czech Republic) K Peschke	2	6	[10]
(Poland) A Rosolska (Australia) A Tomljanović	6	0	[5]
3	(Croatia) D Jurak (United States) A Riske	5	3
(United States) D Krawczyk (Australia) E Perez	7	6
(United States) S Kenin (United States) A Muhammad	6	5	[5]
(Belgium) Y Wickmayer (Slovenia) T Zidanšek	1	7	[10]
(Australia) M Adamczak (China) X Han	6	6
(Netherlands) L Pattinama Kerkhove (Netherlands) B Schoofs	3	3

Semifinals
1	(United States) N Melichar (Czech Republic) K Peschke	6	4	[12]
(United States) D Krawczyk (Australia) E Perez	4	6	[10]
(Belgium) Y Wickmayer (Slovenia) T Zidanšek	6	6
(Australia) M Adamczak (China) X Han	3	2

Final
1	(United States) N Melichar (Czech Republic) K Peschke	6	7^{7}
(Belgium) Y Wickmayer (Slovenia) T Zidanšek	1	6^{2}
