= 2019 Zhengzhou Open =

- Date: 9–15 September
- Edition: 6th
- Category: WTA Premier
- Draw: 28S / 16D
- Prize money: $1,000,000
- Surface: Hard, outdoor
- Location: Zhengzhou, China
- Venue: Zhongyuan Tennis Training Base Management Center

Champions

Singles
- (Czech Republic) Karolína Plíšková

Doubles
- (United States) Nicole Melichar / (Czech Republic) Květa Peschke
- Zhengzhou Open

The 2019 Zhengzhou Open was a professional tennis tournament, played on outdoor hard courts. It was the sixth edition of the tournament and part of the Premier series on the 2019 WTA Tour, offering a total of $1,000,000 in prize money. It took place at the Zhongyuan Tennis Training Base Management Center in Zhengzhou, China, on 9–15 September 2019.

== Points and prize money ==
=== Point distribution ===
Event	W	F	SF	QF	Round of 16	Round of 32	Q	Q3	Q2	Q1
Singles	470	305	185	100	55	1	25	18	13	1
Doubles	470	305	185	100	1	—N/a	—N/a	—N/a	—N/a	—N/a

=== Prize money ===
Event	W	F	SF	QF	Round of 16	Round of 32^{1}	Q3	Q2	Q1
Singles	$267,900	$143,060	$76,410	$41,075	$22,025	$13,980	$6,275	$3,335	$1,855
Doubles *	$83,800	$44,770	$24,465	$12,445	$6,765	—N/a	—N/a	—N/a	—N/a

_{^{1}Qualifiers prize money is also the Round of 32 prize money.}
_{*per team}

== Singles main draw entrants ==
=== Seeds ===
Country	Player	Rank^{1}	Seed
CZE	Karolína Plíšková	3	1
UKR	Elina Svitolina	5	2
NED	Kiki Bertens	7	3
BLR	Aryna Sabalenka	13	4
GER	Angelique Kerber	14	5
USA	Sofia Kenin	20	6
CRO	Petra Martić	22	7
FRA	Caroline Garcia	27	8

- ^{1} Rankings as of 26 August 2019.

=== Other entrants ===
The following players received wildcards into the singles main draw:

- (Germany) Angelique Kerber
- (China) Duan Yingying
- (China) Yang Zhaoxuan

The following players received entry from the qualifying draw:

- (China) Lu Jiajing
- (Netherlands) Lesley Pattinama Kerkhove
- (China) Wang Meiling
- (China) You Xiaodi

=== Withdrawals ===
- (Romania) Simona Halep → replaced by (Czech Republic) Tereza Martincová
- (Estonia) Anett Kontaveit → replaced by (Latvia) Jeļena Ostapenko
- (Greece) Maria Sakkari → replaced by (Italy) Jasmine Paolini
- (Ukraine) Lesia Tsurenko → replaced by (France) Fiona Ferro
- (China) Wang Qiang → replaced by (France) Chloé Paquet

== Doubles entrants ==
=== Seeds ===
Country	Player	Country	Player	Rank^{1}	Seed
USA	Nicole Melichar	CZE	Květa Peschke	36	1
CHN	Duan Yingying	CHN	Zheng Saisai	53	2
CRO	Darija Jurak	USA	Alison Riske	83	3
JPN	Shuko Aoyama	CHN	Yang Zhaoxuan	85	4

- ^{1} Rankings as of 26 August 2019.

=== Other entrants ===
The following pair received a wildcard into the main draw:

- (China) Guo Hanyu / (China) Yuan Yue

== Champions ==
=== Singles ===
- (Czech Republic) Karolína Plíšková def. (Croatia) Petra Martić, 6–3, 6–2

=== Doubles ===
- (United States) Nicole Melichar / (Czech Republic) Květa Peschke def. (Belgium) Yanina Wickmayer / (Slovenia) Tamara Zidanšek, 6–1, 7–6^{(7–2)}.
