= 2016 Jinyuan Cup – Doubles =

Doubles
- 2016 Jinyuan Cup

Final
- Champions: (China) Xun Fangying (China) You Xiaodi
- Runners-up: (Uzbekistan) Akgul Amanmuradova (Slovakia) Michaela Hončová
- Score: 1–6, 6–2, [10–7]

Events
Singles	Doubles
- Jinyuan Cup

Han Na-lae and Jang Su-jeong were the defending champions, but both players chose not to participate.

Xun Fangying and You Xiaodi won the title, defeating Akgul Amanmuradova and Michaela Hončová in the final, 1–6, 6–2, [10–7].

== Seeds ==
1. (Thailand) Nicha Lertpitaksinchai / (Thailand) Peangtarn Plipuech (first round)
2. (Bulgaria) Aleksandrina Naydenova / (Russia) Ekaterina Yashina (first round)
3. (United States) Jacqueline Cako / (United States) Danielle Lao (first round)
4. (China) Xun Fangying / (China) You Xiaodi (champions)

== Draw ==
Key

- Q = Qualifier
- WC = Wild card
- LL = Lucky loser
- Alt = Alternate
- ITF = ITF entry
- PR = Protected ranking
- SR = Special ranking
- SE = Special exempt
- JE = Junior exempt
- JR = Junior Accelerator Programme entrant
- CO = College Accelerator Programme entrant
- NG = Next Gen Accelerator Program entrant
- w/o = Walkover
- r = Retired
- d = Defaulted

First round
1	(Thailand) N Lertpitaksinchai (Thailand) Pe Plipuech	1	6^{0}
(South Korea) N-r Kim (China) Q Ye	6	7^{7}
(China) Y Sheng (Hong Kong) L Zhang	4	7^{7}	[5]
(Uzbekistan) A Amanmuradova (Slovakia) M Hončová	6	6^{3}	[10]
3	(United States) J Cako (United States) D Lao	6	5	[6]
WC	(China) H Tang (China) Y Xin	3	7	[10]
(China) X Gao (China) Y Zhang	4	6	[10]
(Serbia) N Stojanović (Russia) A Tarasova	6	3	[7]
(China) Y Li (China) R Tian	3	2
(China) W Liu (China) Jin Lu	6	6
(Mexico) S León (United States) J Wacnik	3	2
4	(China) F Xun (China) X You	6	6
(China) Jia Lu (China) Y Wang	4	3
WC	(China) J Kang (China) X Sun	6	6
WC	(China) J Chen (China) D Zhao	7	4	[10]
2	(Bulgaria) A Naydenova (Russia) E Yashina	5	6	[3]

Quarterfinals
(South Korea) N-r Kim (China) Q Ye	4	2
(Uzbekistan) A Amanmuradova (Slovakia) M Hončová	6	6
WC	(China) H Tang (China) Y Xin	6	3	[6]
(China) X Gao (China) Y Zhang	3	6	[10]
(China) W Liu (China) Jin Lu	3	5
4	(China) F Xun (China) X You	6	7
WC	(China) J Kang (China) X Sun	6^{4}	5
WC	(China) J Chen (China) D Zhao	7^{7}	7

Semifinals
(Uzbekistan) A Amanmuradova (Slovakia) M Hončová	3	6	[10]
(China) X Gao (China) Y Zhang	6	3	[8]
4	(China) F Xun (China) X You	6	6
WC	(China) J Chen (China) D Zhao	3	2

Final
(Uzbekistan) A Amanmuradova (Slovakia) M Hončová	6	2	[7]
4	(China) F Xun (China) X You	1	6	[10]
