= 2018 Zhengzhou Women's Tennis Open – Doubles =

Doubles
- 2018 Zhengzhou Women's Tennis Open

Final
- Champions: (China) Duan Yingying (China) Wang Yafan
- Runners-up: (United Kingdom) Naomi Broady (Belgium) Yanina Wickmayer
- Score: 7–6^{(7–5)}, 6–3

Events
Singles	Doubles
← 2017 ·	Zhengzhou Women's Tennis Open	· 2019 →

Han Xinyun and Zhu Lin were the defending champions, but chose not to participate together. Han partnered Vera Zvonareva, but lost in the semifinals to Duan Yingying and Wang Yafan. Zhu played alongside You Xiaodi, but lost in the first round to Prarthana Thombare and Xun Fangying.

Duan and Wang went on to win the title, defeating Naomi Broady and Yanina Wickmayer 7–6^{(7–5)}, 6–3 in the final.

== Seeds ==
1. (Japan) Eri Hozumi / (China) Yang Zhaoxuan (quarterfinals)
2. (Japan) Nao Hibino / (China) Zheng Saisai (first round, withdrew)
3. (United Kingdom) Naomi Broady / (Belgium) Yanina Wickmayer (final)
4. (China) Duan Yingying / (China) Wang Yafan (champions)

== Draw ==
=== Key ===
- Q = Qualifier
- WC = Wild card
- LL = Lucky loser
- Alt = Alternate
- SE = Special exempt
- PR = Protected ranking
- ITF = ITF entry
- JE = Junior exempt
- w/o = Walkover
- r = Retired
- d = Defaulted
- SR = Special ranking

=== Draw ===
First round
1	(Japan) E Hozumi (China) Z Yang	6	6
(China) X Jiang (China) Q Tang	4	2
(China) H Guo (China) Q Ye	6	3	[6]
(China) X Han (Russia) V Zvonareva	3	6	[10]
4	(China) Y Duan (China) Y Wang	6	6
(Japan) A Shimizu (Australia) O Tjandramulia	1	1
WC	(China) R Tian (China) K Zhang	1	1
(South Korea) S-j Jang (India) A Raina	6	6
(China) X You (China) L Zhu	3	6^{2}
(India) P Thombare (China) F Xun	6	7^{7}
(China) X Gao (China) C Liang	2	5
3	(United Kingdom) N Broady (Belgium) Y Wickmayer	6	7
(Thailand) L Kumkhum (Thailand) Pe Plipuech	3	6	[9]
(China) Jia Lu (Japan) J Namigata	6	3	[11]
Alt	(Japan) M Imanishi (Uzbekistan) S Sharipova	w/o
2	(Japan) N Hibino (China) S Zheng

Quarterfinals
1	(Japan) E Hozumi (China) Z Yang	6^{2}	5
(China) X Han (Russia) V Zvonareva	7^{7}	7
4	(China) Y Duan (China) Y Wang	6	6
(South Korea) S-j Jang (India) A Raina	4	3
(India) P Thombare (China) F Xun	1	1
3	(United Kingdom) N Broady (Belgium) Y Wickmayer	6	6
(China) Jia Lu (Japan) J Namigata	3	6	[10]
Alt	(Japan) M Imanishi (Uzbekistan) S Sharipova	6	0	[3]

Semifinals
(China) X Han (Russia) V Zvonareva	1	7^{7}	[4]
4	(China) Y Duan (China) Y Wang	6	6^{2}	[10]
3	(United Kingdom) N Broady (Belgium) Y Wickmayer	7^{7}	6
(China) Jia Lu (Japan) J Namigata	6^{2}	3

Final
4	(China) Y Duan (China) Y Wang	7^{7}	6
3	(United Kingdom) N Broady (Belgium) Y Wickmayer	6^{5}	3
