= 2019 Zhengzhou Open – Singles =

Singles
- 2019 Zhengzhou Open

Final
- Champion: (Czech Republic) Karolína Plíšková
- Runner-up: (Croatia) Petra Martić
- Score: 6–3, 6–2

Events
Singles	Doubles
- Zhengzhou Open

Zheng Saisai was the defending champion, but lost in the quarterfinals to Ajla Tomljanović.

Karolína Plíšková won the title, defeating Petra Martić in the final, 6–3, 6–2.

== Seeds ==
The top four seeds received a bye into the second round.

1. (Czech Republic) Karolína Plíšková (champion)
2. (Ukraine) Elina Svitolina (quarterfinals)
3. (Netherlands) Kiki Bertens (second round)
4. (Belarus) Aryna Sabalenka (quarterfinals)
5. (Germany) Angelique Kerber (first round)
6. (United States) Sofia Kenin (quarterfinals)
7. (Croatia) Petra Martić (final)
8. (France) Caroline Garcia (second round)

== Draw ==
Key

- Q = Qualifier
- WC = Wild card
- LL = Lucky loser
- Alt = Alternate
- ITF = ITF entry
- PR = Protected ranking
- SR = Special ranking
- SE = Special exempt
- JE = Junior exempt
- JR = Junior Accelerator Programme entrant
- CO = College Accelerator Programme entrant
- NG = Next Gen Accelerator Program entrant
- w/o = Walkover
- r = Retired
- d = Defaulted

=== Finals ===
Semifinals
1	(Czech Republic) Karolína Plíšková	6	6
(Australia) Ajla Tomljanović	3	2
7	(Croatia) Petra Martić	6	6
(France) Kristina Mladenovic	0	3

Final
1	(Czech Republic) Karolína Plíšková	6	6
7	(Croatia) Petra Martić	3	2

=== Top half ===
First round
(Slovenia) P Hercog	6	6
Q	(China) M Wang	3	4
(France) A Cornet	7^{7}	6
Q	(China) Jia Lu	6^{1}	1
(France) C Paquet	2	5
6	(United States) S Kenin	6	7
(Australia) A Tomljanović	6	6
Q	(Netherlands) L Pattinama Kerkhove	2	0
(Netherlands) B Schoofs	6^{4}	1
(China) S Zheng	7^{7}	6
(United States) A Riske	5	6	7^{8}
5/WC	(Germany) A Kerber	7	4	6^{6}

Second round
1	(Czech Republic) Ka Plíšková	6	7
(Slovenia) P Hercog	3	5
(France) A Cornet	4	2
6	(United States) S Kenin	6	6
3	(Netherlands) K Bertens	4	6^{1}
(Australia) A Tomljanović	6	7^{7}
(China) S Zheng	7	6
(United States) A Riske	5	3

Quarterfinals
1	(Czech Republic) Ka Plíšková	6	4	6
6	(United States) S Kenin	4	6	1
(Australia) A Tomljanović	6	6^{4}	6
(China) S Zheng	1	7^{7}	4

Semifinals
1	(Czech Republic) Ka Plíšková	6	6
(Australia) A Tomljanović	3	2

=== Bottom half ===
First round
7	(Croatia) P Martić	7	6
(Italy) J Paolini	5	1
(France) F Ferro	6	6
WC	(China) Z Yang	2	3
Q	(China) X You	3	6	2
(Latvia) J Ostapenko	6	0	6
8	(France) C Garcia	6	4	7
(Czech Republic) T Martincová	4	6	5
WC	(China) Y Duan	2	3
(France) K Mladenovic	6	6
(Slovenia) T Zidanšek	1	7	1
(Kazakhstan) Y Putintseva	6	5	6

Second round
7	(Croatia) P Martić	3	6	6
(France) F Ferro	6	1	2
(Latvia) J Ostapenko	1	2
4	(Belarus) A Sabalenka	6	6
8	(France) C Garcia	5	2
(France) K Mladenovic	7	6
(Kazakhstan) Y Putintseva	6	1	6^{5}
2	(Ukraine) E Svitolina	3	6	7^{7}

Quarterfinals
7	(Croatia) P Martić	7	5	6
4	(Belarus) A Sabalenka	5	7	4
(France) K Mladenovic	6	4	6
2	(Ukraine) E Svitolina	4	6	3

Semifinals
7	(Croatia) P Martić	6	6
(France) K Mladenovic	0	3

== Qualifying ==
=== Seeds ===
1. (Netherlands) Lesley Pattinama Kerkhove (qualified)
2. (Belgium) Yanina Wickmayer (first round)
3. (Australia) Ellen Perez (first round)
4. (China) Han Xinyun (first round)
5. (China) Lu Jiajing (qualified)
6. (Australia) Lizette Cabrera (second round)
7. (Chinese Taipei) Liang En-shuo (second round)
8. (Serbia) Natalija Kostić (second round)

=== Qualifiers ===
1. (Netherlands) Lesley Pattinama Kerkhove
2. (China) Lu Jiajing
3. (China) You Xiaodi
4. (China) Wang Meiling

=== Draw ===
==== First qualifier ====
First round
1	(Netherlands) Lesley Pattinama Kerkhove	6	7
(Japan) Shuko Aoyama	3	5
WC	(China) Kang Jiaqi	5	5
(Canada) Carol Zhao	7	7
WC	(China) Wu Meixu	6	3	1
(Poland) Magdalena Fręch	2	6	6
(Czech Republic) Renata Voráčová	3	4
6	(Australia) Lizette Cabrera	6	6

Second round
1	(Netherlands) Lesley Pattinama Kerkhove	6	6
(Canada) Carol Zhao	1	4
(Poland) Magdalena Fręch	6	6
6	(Australia) Lizette Cabrera	3	3

Qualifying competition
1	(Netherlands) Lesley Pattinama Kerkhove	7	6
(Poland) Magdalena Fręch	5	0

==== Second qualifier ====
First round
2	(Belgium) Yanina Wickmayer	6	1	1
(United States) Asia Muhammad	3	6	6
(Serbia) Jovana Jakšić	6	6
WC	(Brazil) Laura Pigossi	3	2
(Norway) Ulrikke Eikeri	6	6
(United Kingdom) Naiktha Bains	3	3
WC	(Sweden) Cornelia Lister	6	1	1
5	(China) Lu Jiajing	1	6	6

Second round
(United States) Asia Muhammad	4	6	7
(Serbia) Jovana Jakšić	6	3	5
(Norway) Ulrikke Eikeri	4	0
5	(China) Lu Jiajing	6	6

Qualifying competition
(United States) Asia Muhammad	4	1
5	(China) Lu Jiajing	6	6

==== Third qualifier ====
First round
3	(Australia) Ellen Perez	6^{5}	2
(China) You Xiaodi	7^{7}	6
(Uzbekistan) Sabina Sharipova	6	2	6^{4}
(Slovakia) Zuzana Zlochová	4	6	7^{7}
(United Kingdom) Samantha Murray	6	6
(Croatia) Darija Jurak	0	2
(Japan) Momoko Kobori	2	4
8	(Serbia) Natalija Kostić	6	6

Second round
(China) You Xiaodi	6	7^{9}
(Slovakia) Zuzana Zlochová	3	6^{7}
(United Kingdom) Samantha Murray	6	6
8	(Serbia) Natalija Kostić	3	3

Qualifying competition
(China) You Xiaodi	5	6	6
(United Kingdom) Samantha Murray	7	0	3

==== Fourth qualifier ====
First round
4	(China) Han Xinyun	6	3	1
WC	(China) Bai Zhuoxuan	0	6	6
WC	(Russia) Angelina Gabueva	7	3	2
(Romania) Alexandra Cadanțu	5	6	6
(Japan) Hiroko Kuwata	5	3
WC	(China) Wang Meiling	7	6
(China) Zhang Yuxuan	2	6^{5}
7	(Chinese Taipei) Liang En-shuo	6	7^{7}

Second round
WC	(China) Bai Zhuoxuan	2	6	6
(Romania) Alexandra Cadanțu	6	2	2
WC	(China) Wang Meiling	7	7^{7}
7	(Chinese Taipei) Liang En-shuo	5	6^{3}

Qualifying competition
WC	(China) Bai Zhuoxuan	2	4
WC	(China) Wang Meiling	6	6
