= Wang Yafan =

Chinese inactive tennis player (born 1994)

Wang Yafan 王雅繁
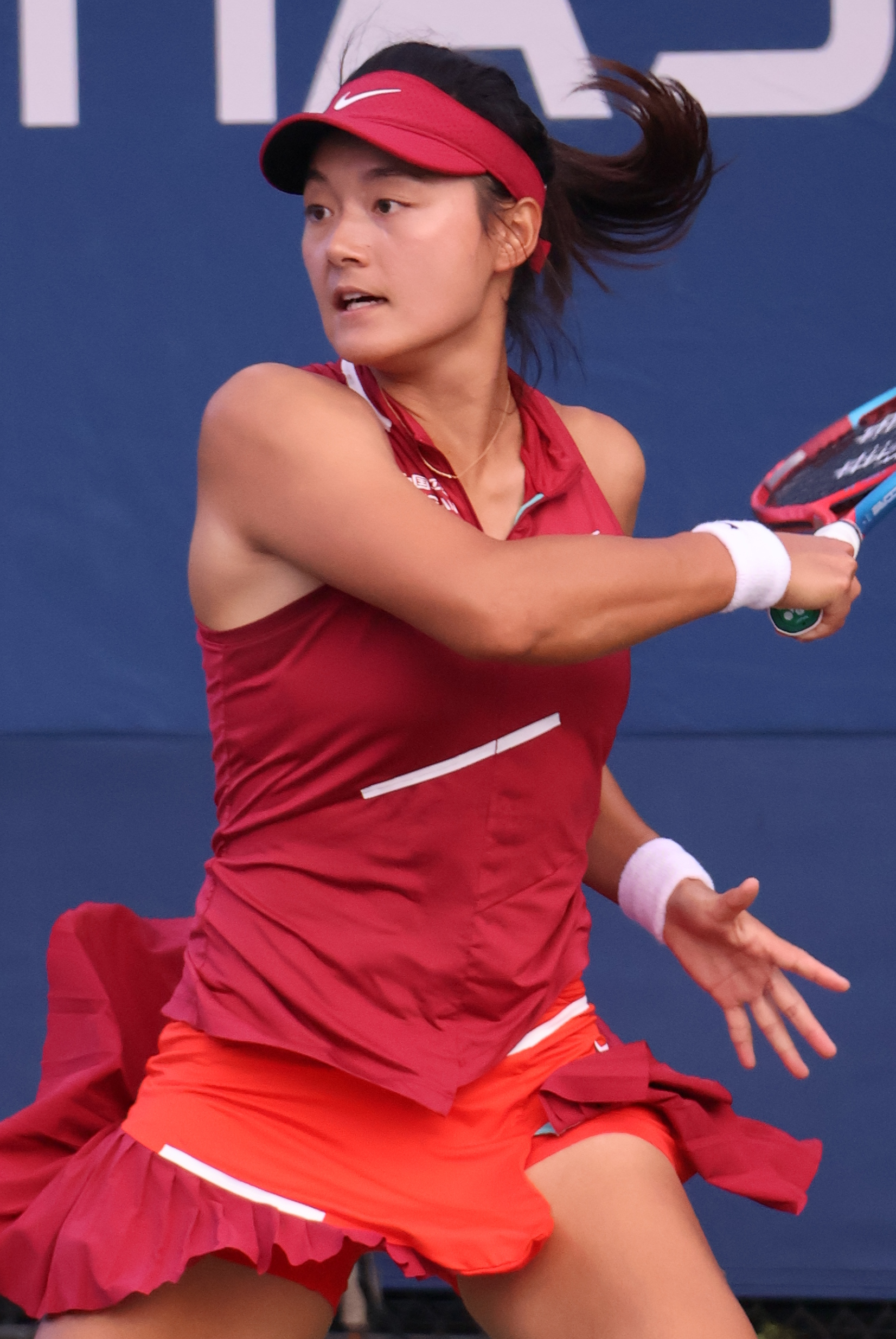
- Wang at the 2023 US Open
- Country (sports): China
- Residence: Beijing, China
- Born: 30 April 1994 (age 32) Nanjing, China
- Height: 1.70 m (5 ft 7 in)
- Plays: Right-handed (two-handed backhand)
- Coach: Karim Perona
- Prize money: US$ 3,751,062

Singles
- Career record: 356–240
- Career titles: 1
- Highest ranking: No. 47 (7 October 2019)
- Current ranking: No. 349 (4 May 2026)

Grand Slam singles results
- Australian Open: 3R (2024)
- French Open: 2R (2024)
- Wimbledon: 2R (2019, 2024)
- US Open: 4R (2024)

Doubles
- Career record: 188–145
- Career titles: 4
- Highest ranking: No. 49 (15 February 2016)
- Current ranking: No. 166 (4 May 2026)

Grand Slam doubles results
- Australian Open: 2R (2016, 2019, 2024)
- French Open: 2R (2016, 2019, 2021, 2024)
- Wimbledon: 3R (2019)
- US Open: 3R (2025)

Grand Slam mixed doubles results
- Wimbledon: 1R (2016)

Team competitions
- Fed Cup: 9–3
- Last updated on: 9 May 2026.

Wang Yafan
- Chinese: 王雅繁
Transcriptions
Standard Mandarin
- Hanyu Pinyin: Wáng Yǎfán
- Bopomofo: ㄨㄤˊ ㄧㄚˇ ㄈㄢˊ
- Gwoyeu Romatzyh: Wang Yeafarn
- Wade–Giles: Wang^{2} Ya^{3}fan^{2}
- Tongyong Pinyin: Wáng Yǎfán
- Yale Romanization: Wáng Yǎfán
- MPS2: Wáng Yǎ-fán
- IPA: [wǎŋ jà fǎn]

Wang Yafan (Chinese: 王雅繁; pinyin: Wáng Yǎfán; Mandarin pronunciation: [wǎŋ jà fǎn]; born 30 April 1994) is a Chinese inactive professional tennis player. On 7 October 2019, she reached her best singles ranking of world No. 47. She peaked at No. 49 in the doubles rankings on 15 February 2016.

In her career, she has won one singles title and four doubles titles on the WTA Tour, along with one singles title and four doubles titles on the Challenger Tour. In addition, she won 16 singles and seven doubles tournaments on the ITF Circuit.

Playing for the China Fed Cup team, Wang has a win–loss record of 9–3, as of September 2024.

== Personal life ==
She was born in Nanjing in 1994. Wang Yafan started playing tennis when she was nine years old.

== Career ==
=== 2014: WTA Tour debut ===
Wang made her WTA Tour debut at the 2014 Shenzhen Open, partnering Zheng Jie in doubles. The pair won their first-round match against wildcards Sun Ziyue and Xu Shilin, and defeated third seeds Irina Buryachok and Oksana Kalashnikova, then lost to eventual champions Monica Niculescu and Klára Zakopalová in the semifinals.

In September 2014 at the Guangzhou International Open, Wang was given a wildcard into the singles main draw, and she advanced to the semifinals, upsetting Samantha Stosur in the first round, and qualifiers Petra Martić and Zhang Kailin along the way. She was knocked out by eventual champion Monica Niculescu.

=== 2018: Breakthrough, Miami Open 4th round ===
Wang made her career breakthrough at the 2018 Miami Open, where she reached the fourth round as a qualifier, then lost to Angelique Kerber.

=== 2019: Maiden career title, top 50 debut ===
Wang won her first ever WTA Tour singles title at the Mexican Open in Acapulco where she defeated Sofia Kenin in three sets, after being down a set and a break. As a result, she achieved her best ranking of world No. 49 on 4 March 2019.

At the Miami Open, she defeated Kristina Mladenovic in the first round. In the second, she clinched her first victory against a top-10 player by defeating Elina Svitolina in straight sets. She then won against Danielle Collins in straight sets and reached the fourth round, but then lost to compatriot Wang Qiang, in straight sets.

=== 2023: Back to top 100 ===
As a qualifier, Wang won the title at the Golden Gate Open, defeating second seed Kamilla Rakhimova in the final.

Ranked No. 114 at the US Open, after four years of absence, she qualified for the main draw and upset Caroline Garcia, her second career top 10 win. As a result, she returned to the top 100 in the rankings on 11 September 2023.

=== 2024: Australian Open 3rd and US Open 4th rounds ===
At the Australian Open, she reached the third round of a Grand Slam tournament for the first time in her career, defeating 22nd seed Sorana Cîrstea and Emma Raducanu, before losing to 12th seed and eventual finalist Zheng Qinwen. As a result, Wang returned to the top 80 on 29 January 2024. At the Thailand Open, she reached her first WTA Tour semifinal since 2019 and seventh overall, defeating Katie Volynets in a third set tiebreak.

At the US Open, she reached the fourth round of a major for the first time in her career, overcoming ninth seed Maria Sakkari by injury retirement for her first top 10 win for the season and second at this tournament, before defeating Diane Parry. She then upset 20th seed Viktoria Azarenka in the third round. This was her fifth career top 20 win and also second in the same tournament for the first time. Her run was ended by 26th seed Paula Badosa.

== Performance timelines ==
Key
W	F	SF	QF	#R	RR	Q#	P#	DNQ	A	Z#	PO	G	S	B	NMS	NTI	P	NH

(W) winner; (F) finalist; (SF) semifinalist; (QF) quarterfinalist; (#R) rounds 4, 3, 2, 1; (RR) round-robin stage; (Q#) qualification round; (P#) preliminary round; (DNQ) did not qualify; (A) absent; (Z#) Davis/Fed Cup Zonal Group (with number indication) or (PO) play-off; (G) gold, (S) silver or (B) bronze Olympic/Paralympic medal; (NMS) not a Masters tournament; (NTI) not a Tier I tournament; (P) postponed; (NH) not held; (SR) strike rate (events won / competed); (W–L) win–loss record.
To avoid confusion and double counting, these charts are updated at the conclusion of a tournament or when the player's participation has ended.

Only main-draw results in WTA Tour, Grand Slam tournaments, Billie Jean King Cup, United Cup, Hopman Cup and Olympic Games are included in win–loss records.

=== Singles ===
Current through the 2025 Australian Open .

Tournament	2012	2013	2014	2015	2016	2017	2018	2019	2020	2021	2022	2023	2024	2025	SR	W–L	Win %
Grand Slam tournaments
Australian Open	A	A	A	Q3	1R	A	Q2	2R	1R	1R	A	A	3R	2R	0 / 6	4–6	40%
French Open	A	A	A	Q2	Q1	A	1R	1R	A	Q1	A	A	2R	A	0 / 3	1–3	25%
Wimbledon	A	A	A	Q3	Q2	A	1R	2R	NH	1R	A	A	2R	A	0 / 4	2–4	33%
US Open	A	A	A	Q2	2R	Q2	2R	1R	A	A	A	2R	4R	1R	0 / 6	6–6	50%
Win–loss	0–0	0–0	0–0	0–0	1–2	0–0	1–3	2–4	0–1	0–2	0–0	1–1	7–4	1–2	0 / 19	13–19	41%
National representation
Billie Jean King Cup (Note: Formerly known as Fed Cup until 2020.)	A	A	A	A	Z1	A	Z1	A	A (Note: Edition is split into the two years due to COVID-19.)		A				0 / 0	3–2	60%
WTA 1000
Qatar Open (Note: The first Premier 5 event of the year has switched back and forth between the Dubai Tennis Championships and the Qatar Ladies Open since 2009. Dubai was classified as a Premier 5 event from 2009 to 2011 before being succeeded by Doha for the 2012–2014 period. In 2015, Dubai regained its Premier 5 status while Doha was demoted to Premier status. The Premier 5 tournaments were reclassified as WTA 1000 tournaments in 2021.)	A	A	A	NMS	Q1	NMS	A	NMS	A	NMS	A	NMS	A	A	0 / 0	0–0	–
Dubai	NMS			A	NMS	A	NMS	A	NMS	A	NMS	A	A	A	0 / 0	0–0	–
Indian Wells Open	A	A	A	A	A	A	Q1	1R	NH	A	A	A	1R	A	0 / 2	0–2	0%
Miami Open	A	A	A	A	A	A	4R	4R	NH	Q1	A	A	1R	A	0 / 3	6–3	67%
Madrid Open	A	A	A	A	A	A	A	1R	NH	Q1	A	A	A	A	0 / 1	0–1	0%
Italian Open	A	A	A	A	A	A	Q1	Q1	A	Q1	A	A	1R	A	0 / 1	0–1	0%
Canadian Open	A	A	A	A	A	A	A	A	A	A	A	A	2R	2R	0 / 2	1–2	33%
Cincinnati Open	A	A	A	A	A	A	A	2R	A	A	A	A	1R	1R	0 / 3	1–3	25%
Guadalajara Open	NH										A	A	NMS		0 / 0	0–0	–
Pan Pacific / Wuhan Open (Note: In 2014, the Pan Pacific Open was downgraded to a Premier event and replaced by the Wuhan Open. The Premier 5 tournaments were reclassified as WTA 1000 tournaments in 2021.)	A	A	Q1	Q2	Q1	1R	1R	2R	NH				Q1	Q2	0 / 3	1–3	25%
China Open	Q1	A	A	Q2	2R	1R	1R	2R	NH			A	1R	A	0 / 5	2–5	29%
Win–loss	0–0	0–0	0–0	0–0	1–1	0–2	3–3	6–6	0–0	0–0	0–0	0–0	1–6	0–2	0 / 20	11–20	35%
Career statistics
	2012	2013	2014	2015	2016	2017	2018	2019	2020	2021	2022	2023	2024	2025	SR	W–L	Win %
Tournaments	0	0	1	3	8	5	12	22	6	9	0	1	16	2	Career total: 69		
Titles	0	0	0	0	0	0	0	1	0	0	0	0	0	0	Career total: 1		
Finals	0	0	0	0	0	0	0	1	0	0	0	0	0	0	Career total: 1		
Overall win–loss	0–0	0–0	3–1	1–3	4–9	5–5	13–13	25–21	3–6	1–9	0–0	1–1	15–16	1–2	1 / 84	72–85	46%
Year-end ranking	520	313	191	135	117	168	73	48	94	300	418	97	61	278	$2,359,815		

=== Doubles ===
Tournament	2014	2015	2016	2017	2018	2019	2020	2021	2022	2024	SR	W–L	Win %
Grand Slam tournaments
Australian Open	A	A	2R	A	1R	2R	1R	1R	A	2R	0 / 6	3–6	33%
French Open	A	1R	2R	A	1R	2R	A	2R	A	2R	0 / 6	4–6	40%
Wimbledon	A	1R	1R	A	1R	3R	NH	1R	A	2R	0 / 6	3–6	33%
US Open	A	A	1R	2R	1R	1R	A	A	A	1R	0 / 5	1–5	17%
Win–loss	0–0	0–2	2–4	1–1	0–4	4–4	0–1	1–3	0–0	3–4	0 / 23	11–23	32%
Year-end championships
WTA Elite Trophy (Note: WTA Tournament of Champions was held from 2009 to 2014, when WTA Elite Trophy replaced it.)	DNQ	W	RR	DNQ			NH				1 / 2	3–2	60%
WTA 1000
Dubai / Qatar Open	A	A	1R	A	A	A	A	A	A		0 / 1	0–1	0%
Italian Open	A	A	1R	A	1R	A	A	1R	A		0 / 3	0–3	0%
Cincinnati Open	A	A	1R	A	A	A	A	A	A	2R	0 / 2	1–2	33%
Pan Pacific / Wuhan Open	1R	1R	1R	1R	QF	1R	NH				0 / 6	2–6	25%
China Open	A	SF	1R	1R	1R	2R	NH			2R	0 / 6	5–6	45%
Career statistics
Tournaments	4	11	16	5	11	15	4	11	0		Career total: 77		
Titles	0	2	0	0	1	0	0	0	0		Career total: 3		
Finals	0	3	1	0	1	1	1	0	0		Career total: 7		
Overall win–loss	4–4	14–9	11–17	1–5	7–10	16–15	5–4	6–11	0–0		3 / 77	64–75	46%
Year-end ranking	158	57	70	361	79	68	79	114	826				

== Significant finals ==
=== WTA Elite Trophy ===
==== Doubles: 1 (title) ====
Result	Year	Venue	Surface	Partner	Opponents	Score
Win	2015	Elite Trophy, Zhuhai	Hard (i)	(China) Liang Chen	(Spain) Anabel Medina Garrigues (Spain) Arantxa Parra Santonja	6–4, 6–3

== WTA Tour finals ==
=== Singles: 1 (title) ===
Legend WTA 1000 WTA 500 WTA 250 (1–0)	Finals by surface Hard (1–0) Grass (0–0) Clay (0–0)

Result	W–L	Date	Tournament	Tier	Surface	Opponent	Score
Win	1–0	Mar 2019	Abierto Mexicano, Mexico	International (Note: The WTA International tournaments were reclassified as WTA 250 tournaments in 2021.)	Hard	(United States) Sofia Kenin	2–6, 6–3, 7–5

=== Doubles: 8 (4 titles, 4 runner-ups) ===
Legend Elite Trophy (1–0) WTA 1000 WTA 500 WTA 250 (3–4)	Finals by surface Hard (4–4) Clay (0–0) Grass (0–0)

Result	W–L	Date	Tournament	Tier	Surface	Partner	Opponents	Score
Loss	0–1	Jan 2015	Shenzhen Open, China	International	Hard	(China) Liang Chen	(Ukraine) Lyudmyla Kichenok (Ukraine) Nadiia Kichenok	4–6, 6–7^{(6–8)}
Win	1–1	Mar 2015	Malaysian Open, Malaysia	International	Hard	(China) Liang Chen	(Ukraine) Yuliya Beygelzimer (Ukraine) Olga Savchuk	4–6, 6–3, [10–4]
Win	2–1	Nov 2015	WTA Elite Trophy, China	Elite Trophy	Hard	(China) Liang Chen	(Spain) Anabel Medina Garrigues (Spain) Arantxa Parra Santonja	6–4, 6–3
Loss	2–2	Mar 2016	Malaysian Open, Malaysia	International	Hard	(China) Liang Chen	(Thailand) Varatchaya Wongteanchai (China) Yang Zhaoxuan	6–4, 4–6, [7–10]
Win	3–2	Feb 2018	Taipei Open, Taiwan	International	Hard (i)	(China) Duan Yingying	(Japan) Nao Hibino (Georgia (country)) Oksana Kalashnikova	7–6^{(7–4)}, 7–6^{(7–5)}
Loss	3–3	Feb 2019	Hua Hin Championships, Thailand	International	Hard	(Russia) Anna Blinkova	(Romania) Irina-Camelia Begu (Romania) Monica Niculescu	6–2, 1–6, [10–12]
Loss	3–4	Mar 2020	Monterrey Open, Mexico	International	Hard	(Japan) Miyu Kato	(Ukraine) Kateryna Bondarenko (Canada) Sharon Fichman	6–4, 3–6, [7–10]
Win	4–4	Nov 2025	Hong Kong Open, China SAR	WTA 250	Hard	(China) Jiang Xinyu	(Japan) Momoko Kobori (Thailand) Peangtarn Plipuech	6–4, 6–2

== WTA Challenger finals ==
=== Singles: 2 (1 title, 1 runner-up) ===
Result	W–L	Date	Tournament	Surface	Opponent	Score
Loss	0–1	Apr 2018	Zhengzhou Open, China	Hard	(China) Zheng Saisai	7–5, 2–6, 1–6
Win	1–1	Aug 2023	Stanford Classic, United States	Hard	Kamilla Rakhimova	6–2, 6–0

=== Doubles: 5 (4 titles, 1 runner-up) ===
Result	W–L	Date	Tournament	Surface	Partner	Opponents	Score
Loss	0–1	Aug 2015	Jiangxi International, China	Hard	(Chinese Taipei) Chan Chin-wei	(Chinese Taipei) Chang Kai-chen (China) Zheng Saisai	3–6, 6–4, [3–10]
Win	1–1	Nov 2015	Hua Hin Challenger, Thailand	Hard (i)	(China) Liang Chen	(Thailand) Varatchaya Wongteanchai (China) Yang Zhaoxuan	6–3, 6–4
Win	2–1	Nov 2017	Hua Hin Challenger, Thailand (2)	Hard (i)	(China) Duan Yingying	(Slovenia) Dalila Jakupović (Russia) Irina Khromacheva	6–3, 6–3
Win	3–1	Apr 2018	Zhengzhou Open, China	Hard	(China) Duan Yingying	(United Kingdom) Naomi Broady (Belgium) Yanina Wickmayer	7–6^{(7–5)}, 6–3
Win	4–1	Jun 2018	Bol Ladies Open, Croatia	Clay	(Colombia) Mariana Duque Mariño	(Spain) Silvia Soler Espinosa (Czech Republic) Barbora Štefková	6–3, 7–5

== ITF Circuit finals ==
=== Singles: 24 (16 titles, 8 runner-ups) ===
Legend $50/60,000 tournaments (3–3) $40,000 tournaments (1–0) $25,000 tournaments (7–3) $10/15,000 tournaments (5–2)	Finals by surface Hard (13–6) Clay (2–1) Grass (1–1)

Result	W–L	Date	Tournament	Tier	Surface	Opponent	Score
Win	1–0	May 2012	ITF Jakarta, Indonesia	10,000	Hard	(China) Yang Zi	6–1, 6–3
Loss	1–1	Dec 2012	ITF Bangkok, Thailand	10,000	Hard	(Thailand) Nungnadda Wannasuk	3–6, 1–6
Win	2–1	Mar 2013	ITF Sydney, Australia	10,000	Hard	(Japan) Misa Eguchi	6–2, 6–0
Win	3–1	Sep 2013	ITF Yeongwol, South Korea	10,000	Hard	(South Korea) Kim Sun-jung	6–1, 6–4
Win	4–1	Sep 2013	ITF Yeongwol, South Korea (2)	10,000	Hard	(Chinese Taipei) Lee Pei-chi	2–6, 6–1, 6–2
Loss	4–2	Feb 2014	ITF Salisbury, Australia	15,000	Hard	(South Korea) Jang Su-jeong	3–6, 6–7^{(6)}
Win	5–2	Jul 2014	ITF Bangkok, Thailand (2)	10,000	Hard	(Uzbekistan) Sabina Sharipova	6–3, 6–2
Win	6–2	Jul 2014	ITF Phuket, Thailand	25,000	Hard (i)	(China) Xu Yifan	3–6, 6–2, 7–5
Win	7–2	Jul 2015	ITF Zhengzhou, China	25,000	Hard	(China) Duan Yingying	6–4, 6–4
Loss	7–3	Apr 2016	ITF Kashiwa, Japan	25,000	Hard	(South Korea) Jang Su-jeong	4–6, 6–1, 3–6
Loss	7–4	Oct 2016	Suzhou Ladies Open, China	50,000	Hard	(Chinese Taipei) Chang Kai-chen	6–4, 2–6, 1–6
Win	8–4	Jul 2017	ITF Tianjin, China	25,000	Hard	(China) Zhu Lin	6–4, 6–2
Win	9–4	Oct 2017	Liuzhou Open, China	60,000	Hard	(Japan) Nao Hibino	3–6, 6–4, 3–3 ret.
Loss	9–5	Aug 2018	Jinan International Open, China	60,000	Hard	(China) Zhu Lin	4–6, 1–6
Win	10–5	Nov 2018	Liuzhou Challenger, China	60,000	Hard	(South Korea) Han Na-lae	6–4, 6–2
Win	11–5	Feb 2022	ITF Antalya, Turkey	25,000	Clay	(Germany) Katharina Hobgarski	7–5, 6–3
Loss	11–6	Feb 2022	ITF Antalya, Turkey	25,000	Clay	(Hungary) Réka Luca Jani	4–6, 3–6
Loss	11–7	Mar 2023	ITF Swan Hill, Australia	25,000	Grass	(Chinese Taipei) Joanna Garland	3–6, 6–4, 6–7^{(7)}
Win	12–7	Mar 2023	Clay Court International, Australia	60,000	Clay	(Australia) Olivia Gadecki	3–6, 6–2, 6–0
Win	13–7	May 2023	ITF Karuizawa, Japan	25,000	Grass	(Japan) Haruka Kaji	6–0, 6–1
Win	14–7	Jun 2023	ITF Tokyo, Japan	25,000	Hard	(Denmark) Johanne Svendsen	6–1, 6–0
Win	15–7	Jun 2023	ITF Luzhou, China	25,000	Hard	(China) You Xiaodi	7–5, 6–2
Win	16–7	Jul 2023	ITF Hong Kong, China SAR	40,000	Hard	(Hong Kong) Eudice Chong	6–2, 6–3
Loss	16–8	Jul 2023	Dallas Summer Series, US	60,000	Hard (i)	(Ukraine) Yulia Starodubtseva	6–3, 2–6, 2–6

=== Doubles: 12 (7 titles, 5 runner-ups) ===
Legend $100,000 tournaments (1–0) $75,000 tournaments (1–0) $50/60,000 tournaments (2–2) $25,000 tournaments (0–1) $10/15,000 tournaments (3–2)	Finals by surface Hard (5–3) Clay (1–1) Grass (0–1) Carpet (1–0)

Result	W–L	Date	Tournament	Tier	Surface	Partner	Opponents	Score
Win	1–0	Apr 2010	ITF Ningbo, China	10,000	Hard	(China) Yang Zhaoxuan	(China) Lu Jiaxiang (Hong Kong) Yang Zi-Jun	1–6, 6–2, [10–4]
Loss	1–1	Jul 2012	ITF Huzhou, China	15,000	Clay	(China) Tian Ran	(China) Li Yihong (China) Zhang Kailin	6–3, 4–6, [6–10]
Win	2–1	Dec 2012	ITF Bangkok, Thailand	10,000	Hard	(China) Wen Xin	(South Korea) Kim Na-ri (South Korea) Lee Ye-ra	7–5, 7–5
Win	3–1	Dec 2012	ITF Bangkok, Thailand (2)	10,000	Hard	(China) Wen Xin	(Vietnam) Huỳnh Phương Đài Trang (China) Li Yihong	6–0, 6–3
Loss	3–2	Mar 2013	ITF Sydney, Australia	10,000	Hard	(Serbia) Tamara Čurović	(Japan) Misa Eguchi (Japan) Mari Tanaka	6–4, 5–7, [8–10]
Win	4–2	Jun 2014	ITF Xi'an, China	50,000	Hard	(China) Lu Jiajing	(China) Liang Chen (China) Yang Zhaoxuan	6–3, 7–6^{(2)}
Loss	4–3	Feb 2015	Launceston International, Australia	50,000	Hard	(China) Yang Zhaoxuan	(China) Han Xinyun (Japan) Junri Namigata	4–6, 6–3, [6–10]
Win	5–3	May 2015	Kangaroo Cup Gifu, Japan	75,000	Hard	(China) Xu Yifan	(Belgium) An-Sophie Mestach (United Kingdom) Emily Webley-Smith	6–2, 6–3
Loss	5–4	Apr 2016	Pingshan Open, China	50,000	Hard	(China) Liang Chen	(Japan) Shuko Aoyama (Japan) Makoto Ninomiya	6–7^{(5)}, 4–6
Win	6–4	May 2016	Kunming Open, China	100,000	Clay	(China) Zhang Kailin	(Thailand) Varatchaya Wongteanchai (China) Yang Zhaoxuan	6–7^{(3)}, 7–6^{(2)}, [10–1]
Loss	6–5	Feb 2023	ITF Swan Hill, Australia	25,000	Grass	(Chinese Taipei) Liang En-shuo	(Australia) Lily Fairclough (Australia) Olivia Gadecki	3–6, 3–6
Win	7–5	May 2023	Kurume Cup, Japan	60,000	Carpet	(Australia) Talia Gibson	(Japan) Funa Kozaki (Japan) Junri Namigata	6–3, 6–3

== Head-to-head record ==
=== Top 10 wins ===
Season	2019	...	2023	2024	Total
Wins	1		1	1	3

#	Player	Rank	Event	Surface	Rd	Score	WYR
2019
1.	(Ukraine) Elina Svitolina	No. 5	Miami Open, US	Hard	2R	6–2, 6–4	No. 50
2023
2.	(France) Caroline Garcia	No. 7	US Open	Hard	1R	6–4, 6–1	No. 114
2024
3.	(Greece) Maria Sakkari	No. 9	US Open	Hard	1R	6–2, ret.	No. 80

=== Double bagel matches (6–0, 6–0) ===
Result	Year	W–L	Tournament	Tier	Surface	Opponent	Rank	Rd	WYR
Win	2023	1–0	US Open	Grand Slam	Hard	(Czech Republic) Sára Bejlek	213	Q1	115
