= Zhengzhou Open =

Defunct tennis tournament
- Event name: Zhengzhou
- Founded: 2014; 12 years ago
- Location: Zhengzhou, China
- Venue: Zhongyuan Tennis Training Base Management Center
- Category: ITF (2014-2016); WTA 125K (2017-2018); WTA Premier (2019); WTA 500 (2023)
- Surface: Hard
- Draw: 28S/32Q/16D
- Prize money: $780,637

Current champions (2023)
- Singles: (China) Zheng Qinwen
- Doubles: (Canada) Gabriela Dabrowski (New Zealand) Erin Routliffe

The Zhengzhou Open was a tournament for professional female tennis players played on outdoor hardcourts. The event was held in Zhengzhou, China, since 2014 as an ITF and then as a WTA 125 tournament in 2017 and 2018. Subsequently, it was upgraded and from 2019 onward was classified as a WTA Premier level tournament, replacing the Connecticut Open in the United States.

In 2023, after a three-year hiatus, the tournament returned for one year as a WTA 500 event. In 2024, the WTA announced that this the 500 event has moved to Ningbo.

== Past finals ==
| Year | Champion | Runner-up | Score |
|---|---|---|---|
↓ ITF event ↓
| 2014 | (China) Zhang Kailin | (China) Xu Yifan | 7–5, 6–4 |
| 2015 | (China) Wang Yafan | (China) Duan Yingying | 6–4, 6–4 |
| 2016 | (Russia) Anastasia Pivovarova | (China) Lu Jingjing | 6–4, 6–4 |
↓ WTA 125K event ↓
| 2017 | (China) Wang Qiang | (China) Peng Shuai | 3–6, 7–6^{(7–3)}, 1–1 ret. |
| 2018 | (China) Zheng Saisai | (China) Wang Yafan | 5–7, 6–2, 6–1 |
↓ WTA Premier event ↓
| 2019 | (Czech Republic) Karolína Plíšková | (Croatia) Petra Martić | 6–3, 6–2 |
| 2020 | Initially rescheduled to October, but later cancelled, due to the COVID-19 pandemic | | |
| 2021 | cancelled due to the COVID-19 pandemic | | |
| 2022 | cancelled due to the COVID-19 pandemic | | |
↓ WTA 500 tournament ↓
| 2023 | (China) Zheng Qinwen | (Czech Republic) Barbora Krejčíková | 2–6, 6–2, 6–4 |

=== Doubles ===
| Year | Champions | Runners-up | Score |
|---|---|---|---|
↓ ITF event ↓
| 2014 | (Chinese Taipei) Chan Chin-wei (China) Liang Chen | (China) Han Xinyun (China) Zhang Kailin | 6–3, 6–3 |
| 2015 | (South Korea) Han Na-lae (South Korea) Jang Su-jeong | (China) Liu Chang (Hong Kong) Zhang Ling | 6–0, 6–3 |
| 2016 | (China) Xun Fangying (China) You Xiaodi | (Uzbekistan) Akgul Amanmuradova (Slovakia) Michaela Hončová | 1–6, 6–2, [10–7] |
↓ WTA 125K event ↓
| 2017 | (China) Han Xinyun (China) Zhu Lin | (United States) Jacqueline Cako (Israel) Julia Glushko | 7–5, 6–1 |
| 2018 | (China) Duan Yingying (China) Wang Yafan | (United Kingdom) Naomi Broady (Belgium) Yanina Wickmayer | 7–6^{(7–5)}, 6–3 |
↓ WTA Premier event ↓
| 2019 | (United States) Nicole Melichar (Czech Republic) Květa Peschke | (Belgium) Yanina Wickmayer (Slovenia) Tamara Zidanšek | 6–1, 7–6^{(7–2)} |
| 2020 | Initially rescheduled to October, but later cancelled, due to the COVID-19 pandemic | | |
| 2021 | cancelled due to the COVID-19 pandemic | | |
| 2022 | cancelled due to the COVID-19 pandemic | | |
↓ WTA 500 tournament ↓
| 2023 | (Canada) Gabriela Dabrowski (New Zealand) Erin Routliffe | (Japan) Shuko Aoyama (Japan) Ena Shibahara | 6–2, 6–4 |
