= 2016 Bank of Liuzhou Cup =

- Date: 24–30 October
- Edition: 1st
- Category: ITF Women's Circuit
- Prize money: $50,000
- Surface: Hard
- Location: Liuzhou, China

Champions

Singles
- (Serbia) Nina Stojanović

Doubles
- (Russia) Veronika Kudermetova / (Russia) Aleksandra Pospelova
Bank of Liuzhou Cup	· 2017 →

The 2016 Bank of Liuzhou Cup was a professional tennis tournament played on outdoor hard courts. It was the first edition of the tournament and part of the 2016 ITF Women's Circuit, offering a total of $50,000 in prize money. It took place in Liuzhou, China, on 24–30 October 2016.

== Singles main draw entrants ==
=== Seeds ===
Country	Player	Rank^{1}	Seed
CHN	Duan Yingying	92	1
GER	Tatjana Maria	110	2
CHN	Wang Yafan	127	3
CHN	Zhu Lin	143	4
UZB	Sabina Sharipova	157	5
TUR	İpek Soylu	158	6
KOR	Jang Su-jeong	169	7
SRB	Nina Stojanović	179	8

- ^{1} Rankings as of 17 October 2016.

=== Other entrants ===
The following player received a wildcard into the singles main draw:

- (China) Lu Jiaxi
- (China) Yuan Chengyiyi
- (China) Zhang Ying

The following players received entry from the qualifying draw:

- (China) Kang Jiaqi
- (China) Sun Ziyue
- (China) Wei Zhanlan
- (China) You Xiaodi

The following player received entry by a special exemption:

- (China) Xu Yifan

== Champions ==
=== Singles ===
- (Serbia) Nina Stojanović def. (South Korea) Jang Su-jeong, 6–3, 6–4

=== Doubles ===
- (Russia) Veronika Kudermetova / (Russia) Aleksandra Pospelova def. (United States) Jacqueline Cako / (Uzbekistan) Sabina Sharipova, 6–2, 6–4
