= 2016 Bank of Liuzhou Cup – Singles =

Singles
- 2016 Bank of Liuzhou Cup

Final
- Champion: (Serbia) Nina Stojanović
- Runner-up: (South Korea) Jang Su-jeong
- Score: 6–3, 6–4

Events
Singles	Doubles
Bank of Liuzhou Cup	· 2017 →

This was a new event on the ITF Women's Circuit.

Nina Stojanović won the inaugural title, defeating Jang Su-jeong in the final, 6–3, 6–4.

== Seeds ==
1. (China) Duan Yingying (quarterfinals, retired)
2. (Germany) Tatjana Maria (second round)
3. (China) Wang Yafan (semifinals)
4. (China) Zhu Lin (quarterfinals)
5. (Uzbekistan) Sabina Sharipova (quarterfinals)
6. (Turkey) İpek Soylu (semifinals)
7. (South Korea) Jang Su-jeong (final)
8. (Serbia) Nina Stojanović (champion)

== Main draw ==
=== Key ===
- Q = Qualifier
- WC = Wild card
- LL = Lucky loser
- Alt = Alternate
- SE = Special exempt
- PR = Protected ranking
- ITF = ITF entry
- JE = Junior exempt
- w/o = Walkover
- r = Retired
- d = Defaulted
- SR = Special ranking

=== Finals ===
Semifinals
8	(Serbia) Nina Stojanović	6	6
3	(China) Wang Yafan	3	4
7	(South Korea) Jang Su-jeong	7^{8}	6
6	(Turkey) İpek Soylu	6^{6}	3

Final
8	(Serbia) Nina Stojanović	6	6
7	(South Korea) Jang Su-jeong	3	4

=== Top half ===
First round
1	(China) Y Duan	4	6	6
(China) R Tian	6	1	4
(China) F Xun	7	6
WC	(China) Y Zhang	5	2
(Poland) K Piter	6	6
(Russia) K Lykina	4	3
(Norway) M Stokke	7	2	3
8	(Serbia) N Stojanović	5	6	6
3	(China) Y Wang	6	6
(United States) J Cako	2	4
(Georgia (country)) S Shapatava	7^{7}	6
Q	(China) Z Wei	6^{3}	2
(Thailand) Pe Plipuech	3	3
Q	(China) J Kang	6	6
Q	(China) Z Sun	2	1
5	(Uzbekistan) S Sharipova	6	6

Second round
1	(China) Y Duan	6^{5}	6	6
(China) F Xun	7^{7}	4	2
(Poland) K Piter	0	3
8	(Serbia) N Stojanović	6	6
3	(China) Y Wang	2	7^{8}	6
(Georgia (country)) S Shapatava	6	6^{6}	4
Q	(China) J Kang	6	1	0
5	(Uzbekistan) S Sharipova	3	6	6

Quarterfinals
1	(China) Y Duan	3	0^{r}
8	(Serbia) N Stojanović	6	0
3	(China) Y Wang	7^{8}	6
5	(Uzbekistan) S Sharipova	6^{6}	1

Semifinals
8	(Serbia) N Stojanović	6	6
3	(China) Y Wang	3	4

=== Bottom half ===
First round
7	(South Korea) S-j Jang	6^{1}	6	6
SE	(China) Y Xu	7^{7}	2	2
(China) Jiaj Lu	5	6	4
WC	(China) C Yuan	7	4	6
(Bulgaria) A Naydenova	6	7^{7}
(Chinese Taipei) Y-h Lee	3	6^{5}
Q	(China) X You	7	1	6^{5}
4	(China) L Zhu	5	6	7^{7}
6	(Turkey) İ Soylu	6	6
(Thailand) N Lertpitaksinchai	2	3
(Russia) V Kudermetova	4	6	6^{5}
(China) X Gao	6	4	7^{7}
(Japan) R Sawayanagi	6	2	1
(Chinese Taipei) K-c Chang	4	6	6
WC	(China) Jiax Lu	1	0
2	(Germany) T Maria	6	6

Second round
7	(South Korea) S-j Jang	6	6
WC	(China) C Yuan	4	0
(Bulgaria) A Naydenova	4	2
4	(China) L Zhu	6	6
6	(Turkey) İ Soylu	2	6	6
(China) X Gao	6	3	4
(Chinese Taipei) K-c Chang	2	7	6
2	(Germany) T Maria	6	5	2

Quarterfinals
7	(South Korea) S-j Jang	6	6
4	(China) L Zhu	2	1
6	(Turkey) İ Soylu	6	1
(Chinese Taipei) K-c Chang	2	0^{r}

Semifinals
7	(South Korea) S-j Jang	7^{8}	6
6	(Turkey) İ Soylu	6^{6}	3
