= 2017 Bank of Liuzhou Cup =

- Date: 23–29 October
- Edition: 2nd
- Category: ITF Women's Circuit
- Prize money: $60,000
- Surface: Hard
- Location: Liuzhou, China

Champions

Singles
- (China) Wang Yafan

Doubles
- (China) Han Xinyun / (Japan) Makoto Ninomiya
← 2016 ·	Bank of Liuzhou Cup	· 2018 →

The 2017 Bank of Liuzhou Cup was a professional tennis tournament played on outdoor hard courts. It was the second edition of the tournament and was part of the 2017 ITF Women's Circuit. It took place in Liuzhou, China, on 23–29 October 2017.

== Singles main draw entrants ==
=== Seeds ===
Country	Player	Rank^{1}	Seed
JPN	Nao Hibino	99	1
JPN	Kurumi Nara	103	2
CHN	Zhu Lin	106	3
JPN	Miyu Kato	123	4
CHN	Han Xinyun	132	5
JPN	Eri Hozumi	160	6
CHN	Wang Yafan	168	7
USA	Jacqueline Cako	172	8

- ^{1} Rankings as of 16 October 2017.

=== Other entrants ===
The following players received a wildcard into the singles main draw:

- (China) Cao Siqi
- (China) You Xiaodi
- (China) Yuan Chengyiyi
- (China) Zhang Yuxuan

The following player received entry using a junior exempt:

- (Russia) Olesya Pervushina

The following players received entry from the qualifying draw:

- (United States) Ingrid Neel
- (Poland) Urszula Radwańska
- (China) Sun Xuliu
- (China) Yang Yidi

== Champions ==
=== Singles ===
- (China) Wang Yafan def. (Japan) Nao Hibino, 3–6, 6–4, 3–3, ret.

=== Doubles ===
- (China) Han Xinyun / (Japan) Makoto Ninomiya def. (United States) Jacqueline Cako / (United Kingdom) Laura Robson, 6–2, 7–6^{(7–3)}
