= 2018 Liuzhou International Challenger =

- Date: 22–28 October (men); 29 October–4 November (women)
- Edition: 1st (men); 3rd (women)
- Category: ATP Challenger Tour; ITF Women's Circuit
- Prize money: $50,000 (men) $60,000 (women)
- Surface: Hard / Outdoors
- Location: Liuzhou, China

Champions

Men's singles
- (Moldova) Radu Albot

Women's singles
- (China) Wang Yafan

Men's doubles
- (China) Gong Maoxin / (China) Zhang Ze

Women's doubles
- (Hong Kong) Eudice Chong / (China) Ye Qiuyu
← 2017 ·	Liuzhou International Challenger	· 2019 →

The 2018 Liuzhou International Challenger was a professional tennis tournament played on hard courts. It was the first edition of the tournament for men and third edition for women. It was the part of the 2018 ATP Challenger Tour and 2018 ITF Women's Circuit. It took place in Liuzhou, China between 22 and 28 October 2018.

== Men's singles main draw entrants ==
=== Seeds ===
Country	Player	Rank^{1}	Seed
MDA	Radu Albot	98	1
IND	Ramkumar Ramanathan	125	2
ITA	Thomas Fabbiano	131	3
JPN	Yūichi Sugita	143	4
ESP	Pedro Martínez	156	5
SRB	Miomir Kecmanović	161	6
IND	Prajnesh Gunneswaran	170	7
JPN	Tatsuma Ito	173	8

- ^{1} Rankings are as of October 15, 2018.

=== Other entrants ===
The following players received wildcards into the singles main draw:

- (China) Sun Fajing
- (China) Te Rigele
- (China) Wu Di
- (China) Wu Yibing

The following players received entry from the qualifying draw:

- (South Korea) Chung Yun-seong
- (Spain) Alejandro Davidovich Fokina
- (India) Sumit Nagal
- (Japan) Renta Tokuda

== Women's singles main draw entrants ==
=== Seeds ===
Country	Player	Rank^{1}	Seed
CHN	Wang Yafan	75	1
UKR	Anhelina Kalinina	108	2
CHN	Liu Fangzhou	138	3
GBR	Katie Swan	163	4
CHN	Han Xinyun	167	5
CAN	Carol Zhao	189	6
KAZ	Elena Rybakina	201	7
CHN	Zhang Yuxuan	209	8

- ^{1} Rankings are as of October 22, 2018.

=== Other entrants ===
The following players received wildcards into the singles main draw:

- (China) Ren Jiaqi
- (China) Wang Yafan
- (China) Wei Sijia
- (China) Zheng Qinwen

The following players received entry from the qualifying draw:

- (South Korea) Choi Ji-hee
- (Germany) Sarah-Rebecca Sekulic
- (China) Ye Qiuyu
- (China) Zhang Kailin

== Champions ==
=== Men's singles ===
- (Moldova) Radu Albot def. (Serbia) Miomir Kecmanović, 6–2, 4–6, 6–3.

=== Women's singles ===
- (China) Wang Yafan def. (South Korea) Han Na-lae, 6–4, 6–2

=== Men's doubles ===
- (China) Gong Maoxin / (China) Zhang Ze def. (Chinese Taipei) Hsieh Cheng-peng / (Indonesia) Christopher Rungkat, 6–3, 2–6, [10–3].

=== Women's doubles ===
- (Hong Kong) Eudice Chong / (China) Ye Qiuyu def. (China) Kang Jiaqi / (South Korea) Lee So-ra, 7–5, 6–3
