= 2017 Bank of Liuzhou Cup – Singles =

Singles
- 2017 Bank of Liuzhou Cup

Final
- Champion: (China) Wang Yafan
- Runner-up: (Japan) Nao Hibino
- Score: 3–6, 6–4, 3–3, ret.

Events
Singles	Doubles
← 2016 ·	Bank of Liuzhou Cup	· 2018 →

Nina Stojanović was the defending champion, but lost in the second round to Nao Hibino.

Wang Yafan won the title, after Hibino retired in the final at 3–6, 6–4, 3–3.

== Seeds ==
1. (Japan) Nao Hibino (final; retired)
2. (Japan) Kurumi Nara (first round; retired)
3. (China) Zhu Lin (quarterfinals)
4. (Japan) Miyu Kato (second round; retired)
5. (China) Han Xinyun (semifinals)
6. (Japan) Eri Hozumi (second round)
7. (China) Wang Yafan (champion)
8. (United States) Jacqueline Cako (first round; retired)

== Draw ==
=== Key ===
- Q = Qualifier
- WC = Wild card
- LL = Lucky loser
- Alt = Alternate
- SE = Special exempt
- PR = Protected ranking
- ITF = ITF entry
- JE = Junior exempt
- w/o = Walkover
- r = Retired
- d = Defaulted
- SR = Special ranking

=== Finals ===
Semifinals
1	(Japan) Nao Hibino	6	6
5	(China) Han Xinyun	0	1
WC	(China) You Xiaodi	6	6^{1}	3
7	(China) Wang Yafan	2	7^{7}	6

Final
1	(Japan) Nao Hibino	6	4	3^{r}
7	(China) Wang Yafan	3	6	3

=== Top half ===
First round
1	(Japan) N Hibino	6	2	6
(China) K Zhang	3	6	4
(Serbia) N Stojanović	6	6
Q	(Poland) U Radwańska	4	1
Q	(United States) I Neel	4	4
(Japan) H Kuwata	6	6
Q	(China) X Sun	3	1
6	(Japan) E Hozumi	6	6
4	(Japan) M Kato	7	6
(China) H Guo	5	1
(Japan) R Sawayanagi	6	6
(China) J Kang	4	2
(China) X Gao	4	3
(Hong Kong) L Zhang	6	6
(China) F Xun	5	3
5	(China) X Han	7	6

Second round
1	(Japan) N Hibino	6	6
(Serbia) N Stojanović	1	1
(Japan) H Kuwata	6	6
6	(Japan) E Hozumi	4	1
4	(Japan) M Kato	2^{r}
(Japan) R Sawayanagi	1
(Hong Kong) L Zhang	6^{3}	7^{7}	5
5	(China) X Han	7^{7}	6^{4}	7

Quarterfinals
1	(Japan) N Hibino	6	6
(Japan) H Kuwata	2	2
(Japan) R Sawayanagi	4	6	2
5	(China) X Han	6	4	6

Semifinals
1	(Japan) N Hibino	6	6
5	(China) X Han	0	1

=== Bottom half ===
First round
8	(United States) J Cako	2	1^{r}
WC	(China) X You	6	3
(Italy) S Errani	6	6
(United Kingdom) L Robson	4	1
(Slovenia) D Jakupović	6	6
WC	(China) S Cao	3	0
WC	(China) C Yuan	4	4
3	(China) L Zhu	6	6
7	(China) Ya Wang	6	6
Q	(China) Y Yang	2	1
(China) Jin Lu	6	6
(Turkey) İ Soylu	4	3
JE	(Russia) O Pervushina	6	6
(India) A Raina	4	1
WC	(China) Yu Zhang	7^{7}	3
2	(Japan) K Nara	6^{2}	2^{r}

Second round
WC	(China) X You	6	3
(Italy) S Errani	3	1^{r}
(Slovenia) D Jakupović	3	6	6^{3}
3	(China) L Zhu	6	4	7^{7}
7	(China) Ya Wang	7	6
(China) Jin Lu	5	3
JE	(Russia) O Pervushina	6	0	4
WC	(China) Yu Zhang	2	6	6

Quarterfinals
WC	(China) X You	6	6
3	(China) L Zhu	4	3
7	(China) Ya Wang	6	6
WC	(China) Yu Zhang	2	2

Semifinals
WC	(China) X You	6	6^{1}	3
7	(China) Ya Wang	2	7^{7}	6
