= 2016 Bank of Liuzhou Cup – Doubles =

Doubles
- 2016 Bank of Liuzhou Cup

Final
- Champions: (Russia) Veronika Kudermetova (Russia) Aleksandra Pospelova
- Runners-up: (United States) Jacqueline Cako (Uzbekistan) Sabina Sharipova
- Score: 6–2, 6–4

Events
Singles	Doubles
Bank of Liuzhou Cup	· 2017 →

This was a new event on the ITF Women's Circuit.

Veronika Kudermetova and Aleksandra Pospelova won the inaugural title, defeating Jacqueline Cako and Sabina Sharipova in the final, 6–2, 6–4.

== Seeds ==
1. (Bulgaria) Aleksandrina Naydenova / (China) You Xiaodi (semifinals)
2. (Thailand) Nicha Lertpitaksinchai / (Thailand) Peangtarn Plipuech (first round)
3. (Chinese Taipei) Chan Chin-wei / (Chinese Taipei) Lee Ya-hsuan (semifinals)
4. (Chinese Taipei) Hsu Ching-wen / (China) Lu Jiajing (withdrew)

== Draw ==
=== Key ===
- Q = Qualifier
- WC = Wild card
- LL = Lucky loser
- Alt = Alternate
- SE = Special exempt
- PR = Protected ranking
- ITF = ITF entry
- JE = Junior exempt
- w/o = Walkover
- r = Retired
- d = Defaulted
- SR = Special ranking

First round
1	(Bulgaria) A Naydenova (China) X You	6	6
(China) Q Zhao (China) L Zhu	2	3
WC	(China) S Cao (China) Yu Li	4	1
(China) Yi Li (China) Yaf Wang	6	6
Alt	(Russia) V Kudermetova (Russia) A Pospelova	6	7^{8}
(China) X Gao (China) F Xun	4	6^{6}
(Thailand) K Buayam (China) Yan Wang	3	2
(Russia) K Lykina (Japan) R Sawayanagi	6	6
(Chinese Taipei) K-c Chang (Serbia) N Stojanović	6	6
WC	(China) Yo Wang (China) X Yang	2	1
(China) R Tian (China) Y Zhang	1	0
3	(Chinese Taipei) C-w Chan (Chinese Taipei) Y-h Lee	6	6
WC	(China) Z Sun (China) Z Wei	7	6
(Russia) A Gabueva (Georgia (country)) S Shapatava	5	2
(United States) J Cako (Uzbekistan) S Sharipova	7	6
2	(Thailand) N Lertpitaksinchai (Thailand) Pe Plipuech	5	2

Quarterfinals
1	(Bulgaria) A Naydenova (China) X You	6	7^{9}
(China) Yi Li (China) Yaf Wang	1	6^{7}
Alt	(Russia) V Kudermetova (Russia) A Pospelova	6	6
(Russia) K Lykina (Japan) R Sawayanagi	1	4
(Chinese Taipei) K-c Chang (Serbia) N Stojanović	4	4
3	(Chinese Taipei) C-w Chan (Chinese Taipei) Y-h Lee	6	6
WC	(China) Z Sun (China) Z Wei	5	2
(United States) J Cako (Uzbekistan) S Sharipova	7	6

Semifinals
1	(Bulgaria) A Naydenova (China) X You	5	3
Alt	(Russia) V Kudermetova (Russia) A Pospelova	7	6
3	(Chinese Taipei) C-w Chan (Chinese Taipei) Y-h Lee	6^{6}	4
(United States) J Cako (Uzbekistan) S Sharipova	7^{8}	6

Final
Alt	(Russia) V Kudermetova (Russia) A Pospelova	6	6
(United States) J Cako (Uzbekistan) S Sharipova	2	4
