= 2019 Liuzhou Open =

- Date: 21–27 October (men); 28 October–3 November (women)
- Edition: 2nd (men); 4th (women)
- Category: ATP Challenger Tour; ITF Women's Circuit
- Surface: Hard / Outdoors
- Location: Liuzhou, China

Champions

Men's singles
- (Spain) Alejandro Davidovich Fokina

Women's singles
- (China) Zhu Lin

Men's doubles
- (Russia) Mikhail Elgin / (Uzbekistan) Denis Istomin

Women's doubles
- (China) Jiang Xinyu / (China) Tang Qianhui
← 2018 ·	Liuzhou Open	· 2020 →

The 2019 Liuzhou Open was a professional tennis tournament played on hard courts. It was the second edition of the tournament for men and fourth edition for women. It was the part of the 2019 ATP Challenger Tour and 2019 ITF Women's World Tennis Tour. It took place in Liuzhou, China between 21 October and 3 November 2019.

== Men's singles main draw entrants ==
=== Seeds ===
Country	Player	Rank^{1}	Seed
IND	Prajnesh Gunneswaran	82	1
ESP	Alejandro Davidovich Fokina	101	2
TPE	Jason Jung	135	3
TUN	Malek Jaziri	148	4
CAN	Steven Diez	156	5
ESP	Enrique López Pérez	188	6
SRB	Danilo Petrović	195	7
USA	Christopher Eubanks	203	8
UZB	Denis Istomin	206	9
EGY	Mohamed Safwat	216	10
CHN	Bai Yan	222	11
POR	Frederico Ferreira Silva	223	12
RUS	Roman Safiullin	229	13
CHN	Li Zhe	232	14
TPE	Wu Tung-lin	236	15
KOR	Lee Duck-hee	248	16

- ^{1} Rankings are as of October 14, 2019.

=== Other entrants ===
The following players received wildcards into the singles main draw:

- (China) Li Yuanfeng
- (China) Mo Yecong
- (China) Wang Aoran
- (China) Wu Hao
- (China) Xia Zihao

The following player received entry into the singles main draw using a protected ranking:

- (Colombia) Nicolás Barrientos

The following players received entry from the qualifying draw:

- (Japan) Toshihide Matsui
- (Croatia) Matej Sabanov

The following player received entry as a lucky loser:

- (Croatia) Ivan Sabanov

== Women's singles main draw entrants ==
=== Seeds ===
Country	Player	Rank^{1}	Seed
CHN	Zhu Lin	95	1
SRB	Nina Stojanović	101	2
CHN	Wang Xinyu	142	3
GEO	Mariam Bolkvadze	158	4
KOR	Han Na-lae	159	5
RUS	Valeria Savinykh	162	6
~~CHN~~	~~Han Xinyun~~	~~172~~	~~7~~
SRB	Natalija Kostić	176	8

- ^{1} Rankings are as of October 21, 2019.

=== Other entrants ===
The following players received wildcards into the singles main draw:

- (China) Liu Yanni
- (China) Ma Yexin
- (China) Sun Xuliu
- (China) Yuan Chengyiyi

The following player received special exempts into the singles main draw:

- (Russia) Anastasia Gasanova
- (Liechtenstein) Kathinka von Deichmann

The following players received entry from the qualifying draw:

- (China) Guo Hanyu
- (China) Guo Meiqi
- (China) Liu Fangzhou
- (Japan) Akiko Omae
- (Poland) Urszula Radwańska
- (Cyprus) Raluca Șerban
- (Ukraine) Daria Snigur
- (China) Sun Ziyue

The following players received entry as lucky losers:

- (South Korea) Kim Da-bin
- (Serbia) Dejana Radanović

== Champions ==
=== Men's singles ===
- (Spain) Alejandro Davidovich Fokina def. (Uzbekistan) Denis Istomin 6–3, 5–7, 7–6^{(7–5)}.

=== Women's singles ===
- (China) Zhu Lin def. (Australia) Arina Rodionova, 2–6, 6–0, 6–1

=== Men's doubles ===
- (Russia) Mikhail Elgin / (Uzbekistan) Denis Istomin def. (South Korea) Nam Ji-sung / (South Korea) Song Min-kyu 3–6, 6–4, [10–6].

=== Women's doubles ===
- (China) Jiang Xinyu / (China) Tang Qianhui def. (India) Ankita Raina / (Netherlands) Rosalie van der Hoek, 6–4, 6–4
