= 2017 Bank of Liuzhou Cup – Doubles =

Doubles
- 2017 Bank of Liuzhou Cup

Final
- Champion: (China) Han Xinyun (Japan) Makoto Ninomiya
- Runner-up: (United States) Jacqueline Cako (United Kingdom) Laura Robson
- Score: 6–2, 7–6^{(7–3)}

Events
Singles	Doubles
← 2016 ·	Bank of Liuzhou Cup	· 2018 →

Veronika Kudermetova and Aleksandra Pospelova were the defending champions, but both players chose not to participate.

Han Xinyun and Makoto Ninomiya won the title after defeating Jacqueline Cako and Laura Robson 6–2, 7–6^{(7–3)} in the final.

== Seeds ==
1. (China) Han Xinyun / (Japan) Makoto Ninomiya (champions)
2. (United States) Jacqueline Cako / (United Kingdom) Laura Robson (final)
3. (China) Jiang Xinyu / (China) Tang Qianhui (quarterfinals; retired)
4. (Slovenia) Dalila Jakupović / (India) Ankita Raina (semifinals)

== Draw ==
=== Key ===
- Q = Qualifier
- WC = Wild card
- LL = Lucky loser
- Alt = Alternate
- SE = Special exempt
- PR = Protected ranking
- ITF = ITF entry
- JE = Junior exempt
- w/o = Walkover
- r = Retired
- d = Defaulted
- SR = Special ranking

First round
1	(China) X Han (Japan) M Ninomiya	6	6
(China) J Chen (China) Yi Zhang	4	2
(China) F Xun (China) X You	3	6	[5]
(China) S Feng (China) J Kang	6	1	[10]
4	(Slovenia) D Jakupović (India) A Raina	6	6^{5}	[10]
(China) X Sun (China) Z Sun	2	7^{7}	[3]
WC	(China) Xinyi Jiang (China) Yo Wang	2	2
WC	(China) Z Wei (China) Yu Zhang	6	6
(Switzerland) K Kennel (United States) I Neel	6	6
(Japan) A Okuno (Hong Kong) L Zhang	2	2
(Turkey) İ Soylu (China) Ya Wang	6	1	[5]
3	(China) Xinyu Jiang (China) Q Tang	4	6	[10]
(China) Y Sheng (China) W Zheng	6	6
WC	(China) S Guo (China) Y Liu	4	4
(China) H Guo (China) Q Ye	0	6^{5}
2	(United States) J Cako (United Kingdom) L Robson	6	7^{7}

Quarterfinals
1	(China) X Han (Japan) M Ninomiya	6	6
(China) S Feng (China) J Kang	1	1
4	(Slovenia) D Jakupović (India) A Raina	6	7^{8}
WC	(China) Z Wei (China) Yu Zhang	0	6^{6}
(Switzerland) K Kennel (United States) I Neel	6	1
3	(China) Xinyu Jiang (China) Q Tang	1	0^{r}
(China) Y Sheng (China) W Zheng	6	4	[5]
2	(United States) J Cako (United Kingdom) L Robson	1	6	[10]

Semifinals
1	(China) X Han (Japan) M Ninomiya	7^{7}	6
4	(Slovenia) D Jakupović (India) A Raina	6^{2}	3
(Switzerland) K Kennel (United States) I Neel	5	5
2	(United States) J Cako (United Kingdom) L Robson	7	7

Final
1	(China) X Han (Japan) M Ninomiya	6	7^{7}
2	(United States) J Cako (United Kingdom) L Robson	2	6^{3}
