= 2019 Liuzhou Open – Women's doubles =

Women's doubles
- 2019 Liuzhou Open

Final
- Champions: (China) Jiang Xinyu (China) Tang Qianhui
- Runners-up: (India) Ankita Raina (Netherlands) Rosalie van der Hoek
- Score: 6–4, 6–4

Events
Singles	men	women
Doubles	men	women
← 2018 ·	Liuzhou Open	· 2020 →

Eudice Chong and Ye Qiuyu were the defending champions, but Ye chose not to participate. Chong partnered Zheng Wushuang, but lost in the first round to Feng Shuo and Guo Hanyu.

Jiang Xinyu and Tang Qianhui won the title, defeating Ankita Raina and Rosalie van der Hoek in the final, 6–4, 6–4.

== Seeds ==
1. (China) Jiang Xinyu / (China) Tang Qianhui (champions)
2. (India) Ankita Raina / (Netherlands) Rosalie van der Hoek (final)
3. (Georgia (country)) Sofia Shapatava / (United Kingdom) Emily Webley-Smith (first round)
4. (South Korea) Han Na-lae / (Chinese Taipei) Wu Fang-hsien (quarterfinals)

== Draw ==
=== Key ===
- Q = Qualifier
- WC = Wild card
- LL = Lucky loser
- Alt = Alternate
- SE = Special exempt
- PR = Protected ranking
- ITF = ITF entry
- JE = Junior exempt
- w/o = Walkover
- r = Retired
- d = Defaulted
- SR = Special ranking

=== Draw ===
First round
1	(China) X Jiang (China) Q Tang	6	6
WC	(Hong Kong) K-y Ng (China) S Zheng	4	2
(China) S Xu (China) X You	6	6
WC	(China) C Liu (China) Z Sun	1	2
4	(South Korea) N-l Han (Chinese Taipei) F-h Wu	6	7
Alt	(Cyprus) R Șerban (Japan) M Uchijima	1	5
(Hong Kong) E Chong (China) W Zheng	4	4
(China) S Feng (China) H Guo	6	6
(Serbia) N Kostić (China) F Xun	6	6
(South Korea) S-j Jang (China) Jia Lu	4	2
(South Korea) J-h Choi (Japan) A Omae	6	3	[10]
3	(Georgia (country)) S Shapatava (United Kingdom) E Webley-Smith	1	6	[5]
WC	(China) J Chen (China) F Liu	6	5	[6]
Alt	(Russia) A Gasanova (South Africa) C Simmonds	3	7	[10]
(Slovenia) D Jakupović (Germany) S-R Sekulic	4	3
2	(India) A Raina (Netherlands) R van der Hoek	6	6

Quarterfinals
1	(China) X Jiang (China) Q Tang	6	6
(China) S Xu (China) X You	4	2
4	(South Korea) N-l Han (Chinese Taipei) F-h Wu	7^{7}	6^{3}	[8]
(China) S Feng (China) H Guo	6^{3}	7^{7}	[10]
(Serbia) N Kostić (China) F Xun	1	6^{6}
(South Korea) J-h Choi (Japan) A Omae	6	7^{8}
Alt	(Russia) A Gasanova (South Africa) C Simmonds	0	6	[7]
2	(India) A Raina (Netherlands) R van der Hoek	6	4	[10]

Semifinals
1	(China) X Jiang (China) Q Tang	6	6
(China) S Feng (China) H Guo	0	0
(South Korea) J-h Choi (Japan) A Omae	7	1	[7]
2	(India) A Raina (Netherlands) R van der Hoek	5	6	[10]

Final
1	(China) X Jiang (China) Q Tang	6	6
2	(India) A Raina (Netherlands) R van der Hoek	4	4
