= 2018 Liuzhou International Challenger – Women's doubles =

Women's doubles
- 2018 Liuzhou International Challenger

Final
- Champions: (Hong Kong) Eudice Chong (China) Ye Qiuyu
- Runners-up: (China) Kang Jiaqi (South Korea) Lee So-ra
- Score: 7–5, 6–3

Events
Singles	men	women
Doubles	men	women
← 2017 ·	Liuzhou International Challenger	· 2019 →

Han Xinyun and Makoto Ninomiya were the defending champions, but both players chose not to participate.

Eudice Chong and Ye Qiuyu won the title, defeating Kang Jiaqi and Lee So-ra in the final, 7–5, 6–3.

== Seeds ==
1. (Chinese Taipei) Chen Pei-hsuan / (Chinese Taipei) Wu Fang-hsien (quarterfinals)
2. (South Korea) Choi Ji-hee / (South Korea) Kim Na-ri (first round)
3. (China) Guo Hanyu / (China) Zhang Ying (first round)
4. (South Korea) Han Na-lae / (South Korea) Jang Su-jeong (first round)

== Draw ==
=== Key ===
- Q = Qualifier
- WC = Wild card
- LL = Lucky loser
- Alt = Alternate
- SE = Special exempt
- PR = Protected ranking
- ITF = ITF entry
- JE = Junior exempt
- w/o = Walkover
- r = Retired
- d = Defaulted
- SR = Special ranking

=== Draw ===
First round
1	(Chinese Taipei) P-h Chen (Chinese Taipei) F-h Wu	6	6
(Russia) A Gabueva (Canada) C Zhao	3	0
(China) M Wang (China) M Wu	5	7	[10]
(China) S Feng (China) X Sun	7	5	[12]
4	(South Korea) N-l Han (South Korea) S-j Jang	6	3	[8]
(China) J Kang (South Korea) S-r Lee	4	6	[10]
(Hong Kong) H-c Wu (United States) A Zhu	1	7^{7}	[8]
(China) J Chen (China) Y Sheng	6	6^{2}	[10]
WC	(Germany) S-R Sekulic (China) C Yuan	7^{7}	0	[9]
(China) Y Liu (China) J Ren	6^{2}	6	[11]
(South Korea) D-b Kim (Hong Kong) L Zhang	6	6
3	(China) H Guo (China) Yi Zhang	3	2
(Hong Kong) E Chong (China) Q Ye	3	6	[14]
(Thailand) P Plipuech (Indonesia) A Sutjiadi	6	1	[12]
(Russia) O Doroshina (Kazakhstan) E Rybakina	6	4	[11]
2	(South Korea) J-h Choi (South Korea) N-r Kim	2	6	[9]

Quarterfinals
1	(Chinese Taipei) P-h Chen (Chinese Taipei) F-h Wu	0	1
(China) S Feng (China) X Sun	6	6
(China) J Kang (South Korea) S-r Lee	6	6
(China) J Chen (China) Y Sheng	4	2
(China) Y Liu (China) J Ren	1	4
(South Korea) D-b Kim (Hong Kong) L Zhang	6	6
(Hong Kong) E Chong (China) Q Ye	6	6
(Russia) O Doroshina (Kazakhstan) E Rybakina	2	1

Semifinals
(China) S Feng (China) X Sun	6	4	[6]
(China) J Kang (South Korea) S-r Lee	3	6	[10]
(South Korea) D-b Kim (Hong Kong) L Zhang	0	2
(Hong Kong) E Chong (China) Q Ye	6	6

Final
(China) J Kang (South Korea) S-r Lee	5	3
(Hong Kong) E Chong (China) Q Ye	7	6
