= 2018 Liuzhou International Challenger – Women's singles =

Women's singles
- 2018 Liuzhou International Challenger

Final
- Champion: (China) Wang Yafan
- Runner-up: (South Korea) Han Na-lae
- Score: 6–4, 6–2

Events
| Singles | men | women |
| Doubles | men | women |
| ← 2017 · | Liuzhou International Challenger | · 2019 → |

Wang Yafan was the defending champion and successfully defended her title, defeating Han Na-lae in the final, 6–4, 6–2.

== Seeds ==
1. (China) Wang Yafan (champion)
2. (Ukraine) Anhelina Kalinina (second round)
3. (China) Liu Fangzhou (quarterfinals)
4. (United Kingdom) Katie Swan (semifinals, retired)
5. (China) Han Xinyun (second round)
6. (Canada) Carol Zhao (first round)
7. (Kazakhstan) Elena Rybakina (second round)
8. (China) Zhang Yuxuan (first round)

== Draw ==
=== Key ===
- Q = Qualifier
- WC = Wild card
- LL = Lucky loser
- Alt = Alternate
- SE = Special exempt
- PR = Protected ranking
- ITF = ITF entry
- JE = Junior exempt
- w/o = Walkover
- r = Retired
- d = Defaulted
- SR = Special ranking

=== Finals ===
Semifinals
1/WC | (China) Wang Yafan | 6 | 1
4 | (United Kingdom) Katie Swan | 2 | 0^{r}
(China) Wang Xinyu | 4 | 7 | 5
(South Korea) Han Na-lae | 6 | 5 | 7

Final
1/WC | (China) Wang Yafan | 6 | 6
(South Korea) Han Na-lae | 4 | 2

=== Top half ===
First round
1/WC | (China) Y Wang | 6 | 6
WC | (China) Q Zheng | 4 | 1
(South Korea) S-r Lee | 3 | 7 | 5
(Canada) LA Fernandez | 6 | 5 | 7
Q | (China) K Zhang | 6 | 6
(China) M Wang | 4 | 4
(China) Y Yuan | 6 | 6
6 | (Canada) C Zhao | 2 | 2
4 | (United Kingdom) K Swan | 6 | 6
(Hong Kong) L Zhang | 3 | 3
(Chinese Taipei) E-s Liang | 6 | 6
(China) Jin Lu | 4 | 4
WC | (China) S Wei | 5 | 4
(China) X You | 7 | 6
Q | (South Korea) J-h Choi | 2 | 6 | 0
7 | (Kazakhstan) E Rybakina | 6 | 4 | 6

Second round
1/WC | (China) Y Wang | 6 | 7
(Canada) LA Fernandez | 3 | 5
Q | (China) K Zhang | 3 | 6 | 7
(China) Y Yuan | 6 | 1 | 5
4 | (United Kingdom) K Swan | 6 | 6
(Chinese Taipei) E-s Liang | 4 | 2
(China) X You | 7^{7} | 6
7 | (Kazakhstan) E Rybakina | 6^{1} | 4

Quarterfinals
1/WC | (China) Y Wang | 4 | 7^{7} | 6
(China) K Zhang | 6 | 6^{2} | 4
4 | (United Kingdom) K Swan | 6 | 6
(China) X You | 3 | 2

Semifinals
1/WC | (China) Y Wang | 6 | 1
4 | (United Kingdom) K Swan | 2 | 0^{r}

=== Bottom half ===
First round
8 | (China) Yu Zhang | 4 | 3
(China) Xin Wang | 6 | 6
(South Korea) S-j Jang | 5 | 3
(Thailand) P Plipuech | 7 | 6
(China) A Gai | 0 | 4
(Russia) O Doroshina | 6 | 6
Q | (China) Q Ye | 1 | 1
3 | (China) F Liu | 6 | 6
5 | (China) X Han | 6 | 6
(China) H Guo | 3 | 3
Q | (Germany) S-R Sekulic | 6 | 3 | 6
(China) X Sun | 0 | 6 | 4
WC | (China) J Ren | 3 | 2
(South Korea) N-l Han | 6 | 6
(Chinese Taipei) Y-h Lee | 6 | 3 | 3
2 | (Ukraine) A Kalinina | 4 | 6 | 6

Second round
(China) Xin Wang | 6 | 6
(Thailand) P Plipuech | 4 | 4
(Russia) O Doroshina | 3 | 4
3 | (China) F Liu | 6 | 6
5 | (China) X Han | 2 | 2
Q | (Germany) S-R Sekulic | 6 | 6
(South Korea) N-l Han | 6 | 1 | 6
2 | (Ukraine) A Kalinina | 1 | 6 | 4

Quarterfinals
(China) Xin Wang | 6^{7} | 7 | 7^{7}
3 | (China) F Liu | 7^{9} | 5 | 6^{2}
Q | (Germany) S-R Sekulic | 1 | 4
(South Korea) N-l Han | 6 | 6

Semifinals
(China) Xin Wang | 4 | 7 | 5
(South Korea) N-l Han | 6 | 5 | 7
