= 2019 Liuzhou Open – Men's singles =

Men's singles
- 2019 Liuzhou Open

Final
- Champion: (Spain) Alejandro Davidovich Fokina
- Runner-up: (Uzbekistan) Denis Istomin
- Score: 6–3, 5–7, 7–6^{(7–5)}

Events
Singles	men	women
Doubles	men	women
- Liuzhou Open

Radu Albot was the defending champion but chose not to defend his title.

Alejandro Davidovich Fokina won the title after defeating Denis Istomin 6–3, 5–7, 7–6^{(7–5)} in the final.

== Seeds ==
All seeds receive a bye into the second round.

1. (India) Prajnesh Gunneswaran (third round, withdrew)
2. (Spain) Alejandro Davidovich Fokina (champion)
3. (Chinese Taipei) Jason Jung (quarterfinals)
4. (Tunisia) Malek Jaziri (third round)
5. (Canada) Steven Diez (third round)
6. (Spain) Enrique López Pérez (second round)
7. (Serbia) Danilo Petrović (semifinals, retired)
8. (United States) Christopher Eubanks (third round)
9. (Uzbekistan) Denis Istomin (final)
10. (Egypt) Mohamed Safwat (second round)
11. (China) Bai Yan (second round)
12. (Portugal) Frederico Ferreira Silva (third round)
13. (Russia) Roman Safiullin (third round)
14. (China) Li Zhe (quarterfinals)
15. (Chinese Taipei) Wu Tung-lin (quarterfinals)
16. (South Korea) Lee Duck-hee (second round)

== Draw ==
Key

- Q = Qualifier
- WC = Wild card
- LL = Lucky loser
- Alt = Alternate
- ITF = ITF entry
- PR = Protected ranking
- SR = Special ranking
- SE = Special exempt
- JE = Junior exempt
- JR = Junior Accelerator Programme entrant
- CO = College Accelerator Programme entrant
- NG = Next Gen Accelerator Program entrant
- w/o = Walkover
- r = Retired
- d = Defaulted

=== Finals ===
Quarterfinals
15	(Chinese Taipei) Wu Tung-lin	2	3
9	(Uzbekistan) Denis Istomin	6	6
14	(China) Li Zhe	4	4
7	(Serbia) Danilo Petrović	6	6
(Croatia) Borna Gojo	7^{7}	6
3	(Chinese Taipei) Jason Jung	6^{4}	1
(Japan) Yuta Shimizu	7	3	1
2	(Spain) Alejandro Davidovich Fokina	5	6	6

Semifinals
9	(Uzbekistan) Denis Istomin	4
7	(Serbia) Danilo Petrović	3^{r}
(Croatia) Borna Gojo	2	2
2	(Spain) Alejandro Davidovich Fokina	6	6

Final
9	(Uzbekistan) Denis Istomin	3	7	6^{5}
2	(Spain) Alejandro Davidovich Fokina	6	5	7^{7}

=== Top half ===
==== Section 1 ====
First round
PR	(Colombia) N Barrientos	6	3	7^{8}
(China) F Sun	4	6	6^{6}
(Uzbekistan) K Sultanov	6	6
WC	(China) A Wang	2	0
(Japan) Makoto Ochi	6	6
LL	(Croatia) I Sabanov	2	2
(Kazakhstan) D Yevseyev	6	6
WC	(China) Y Mo	3	0

Second round
1	(India) P Gunneswaran	6	6
PR	(Colombia) N Barrientos	2	1
(Uzbekistan) K Sultanov	1	3
15	(Chinese Taipei) T-l Wu	6	6
9	(Uzbekistan) D Istomin	7^{7}	6
(Japan) M Ochi	6^{3}	3
(Kazakhstan) D Yevseyev	6	3	2
5	(Canada) S Diez	3	6	6

Third round
1	(India) P Gunneswaran
15	(Chinese Taipei) T-l Wu	w/o
9	(Uzbekistan) D Istomin	4	7^{7}	6
5	(Canada) S Diez	6	6^{4}	0

Quarterfinals
15	(Chinese Taipei) T-l Wu	2	3
9	(Uzbekistan) D Istomin	6	6

==== Section 2 ====
First round
(France) F Reboul	3	4
(China) Y He	6	6
(China) X Gao	4	4
(India) Sidharth Rawat	6	6
WC	(China) Xia Zihao	2	0
(Japan) R Noguchi	6	6
(South Korea) J-s Nam	6	7^{7}
(Japan) K Uchida	3	6^{4}

Second round
4	(Tunisia) M Jaziri	6	6
(China) Y He	1	0
(India) S Rawat	2	3
14	(China) Z Li	6	6
12	(Portugal) F Ferreira Silva	7	6
(Japan) R Noguchi	5	4
(South Korea) J-s Nam	3	4
7	(Serbia) D Petrović	6	6

Third round
4	(Tunisia) M Jaziri	4	2
14	(China) Z Li	6	6
12	(Portugal) F Ferreira Silva	6^{8}	6^{6}
7	(Serbia) D Petrović	7^{10}	7^{8}

Quarterfinals
14	(China) Z Li	4	4
7	(Serbia) D Petrović	6	6

=== Bottom half ===
==== Section 3 ====
First round
Q	(Croatia) M Sabanov	6	6
WC	(China) Li Yuanfeng	3	2
(Croatia) B Gojo	6	6
(Netherlands) T van Rijthoven	1	3
(Japan) Renta Tokuda	7	4	3
(China) J Cui	5	6	6
Q	(Japan) T Matsui	4	6	6
WC	(China) Wu Hao	6	1	4

Second round
8	(United States) C Eubanks	6	6
Q	(Croatia) M Sabanov	4	2
(Croatia) B Gojo	7^{7}	6
11	(China) Y Bai	6^{5}	0
16	(South Korea) D-h Lee	2	4
(China) J Cui	6	6
Q	(Japan) T Matsui	2	2
3	(Chinese Taipei) J Jung	6	6

Third round
8	(United States) C Eubanks	6^{4}	5
(Croatia) B Gojo	7^{7}	7
(China) J Cui	5	4
3	(Chinese Taipei) J Jung	7	6

Quarterfinals
(Croatia) B Gojo	7^{7}	6
3	(Chinese Taipei) J Jung	6^{4}	1

==== Section 4 ====
First round
(Portugal) G Oliveira	2	2
(Russia) K Kravchuk	6	6
(Japan) Y Shimizu	6	1
(Russia) I Nedelko	0	1^{r}
(Ukraine) D Kalenichenko	6	6
(Japan) Y Takahashi	2	2
(South Korea) Y-s Chung	6	7^{7}
(Japan) T Niki	2	6^{2}

Second round
6	(Spain) E López Pérez	3	3
(Russia) K Kravchuk	6	6
(Japan) Y Shimizu	6	6
10	(Egypt) M Safwat	1	2
13	(Russia) R Safiullin	7	6
(Ukraine) D Kalenichenko	5	4
(South Korea) Y-s Chung	5	5
2	(Spain) A Davidovich Fokina	7	7

Third round
(Russia) K Kravchuk	7	4	0^{r}
(Japan) Y Shimizu	5	6	2
13	(Russia) R Safiullin	3	3
2	(Spain) A Davidovich Fokina	6	6

Quarterfinals
(Japan) Y Shimizu	7	3	1
2	(Spain) A Davidovich Fokina	5	6	6
