= 2019 Liuzhou Open – Men's doubles =

Men's doubles
- 2019 Liuzhou Open

Final
- Champions: (Russia) Mikhail Elgin (Uzbekistan) Denis Istomin
- Runners-up: (South Korea) Nam Ji-sung (South Korea) Song Min-kyu
- Score: 3–6, 6–4, [10–6]

Events
Singles	men	women
Doubles	men	women
- Liuzhou Open

Gong Maoxin and Zhang Ze were the defending champions but chose not to defend their title.

Mikhail Elgin and Denis Istomin won the title after defeating Nam Ji-sung and Song Min-kyu 3–6, 6–4, [10–6] in the final.

== Seeds ==
1. (Sweden) André Göransson / (Indonesia) Christopher Rungkat (quarterfinals)
2. (India) Jeevan Nedunchezhiyan / (Canada) Adil Shamasdin (first round)
3. (South Korea) Nam Ji-sung / (South Korea) Song Min-kyu (final)
4. (France) Sadio Doumbia / (France) Fabien Reboul (first round)

== Draw ==
Key

- Q = Qualifier
- WC = Wild card
- LL = Lucky loser
- Alt = Alternate
- ITF = ITF entry
- PR = Protected ranking
- SR = Special ranking
- SE = Special exempt
- JE = Junior exempt
- JR = Junior Accelerator Programme entrant
- CO = College Accelerator Programme entrant
- NG = Next Gen Accelerator Program entrant
- w/o = Walkover
- r = Retired
- d = Defaulted

First round
1	(Sweden) A Göransson (Indonesia) C Rungkat	6	6
WC	(China) F Sun (China) Wu Hao	3	2
(Spain) A Davidovich Fokina (Spain) E López Pérez	3	2
PR	(Russia) M Elgin (Uzbekistan) D Istomin	6	6
4	(France) S Doumbia (France) F Reboul	3	6^{6}
(Japan) T Matsui (India) V Vardhan	6	7^{8}
(United States) C Eubanks (Japan) K Uchida	7^{7}	6
(Canada) S Diez (Egypt) M Safwat	6^{1}	4
(Colombia) N Barrientos (China) Z Li	2	6	[9]
WC	(China) X Gao (China) A Wang	6	4	[11]
WC	(China) Wang Huixin (China) Xiao Linang	2	3
3	(South Korea) J-s Nam (South Korea) M-k Song	6	6
(South Korea) D-h Lee (Portugal) G Oliveira	4	2
(China) Y Bai (South Korea) Y-s Chung	6	6
(Croatia) I Sabanov (Croatia) M Sabanov	6	6
2	(India) J Nedunchezhiyan (Canada) A Shamasdin	4	3

Quarterfinals
1	(Sweden) A Göransson (Indonesia) C Rungkat	7^{7}	4	[8]
PR	(Russia) M Elgin (Uzbekistan) D Istomin	6^{2}	6	[10]
(Japan) T Matsui (India) V Vardhan	6	6^{4}	[12]
(United States) C Eubanks (Japan) K Uchida	2	7^{7}	[10]
WC	(China) X Gao (China) A Wang	4	3
3	(South Korea) J-s Nam (South Korea) M-k Song	6	6
(China) Y Bai (South Korea) Y-s Chung	7^{7}	4	[10]
(Croatia) I Sabanov (Croatia) M Sabanov	6^{5}	6	[8]

Semifinals
PR	(Russia) M Elgin (Uzbekistan) D Istomin	6	3	[10]
(Japan) T Matsui (India) V Vardhan	4	6	[7]
3	(South Korea) J-s Nam (South Korea) M-k Song	6	6
(China) Y Bai (South Korea) Y-s Chung	3	4

Final
PR	(Russia) M Elgin (Uzbekistan) D Istomin	3	6	[10]
3	(South Korea) J-s Nam (South Korea) M-k Song	6	4	[6]
