= 2019 Liuzhou Open – Women's singles =

Women's singles
- 2019 Liuzhou Open

Final
- Champion: (China) Zhu Lin
- Runner-up: (Australia) Arina Rodionova
- Score: 2–6, 6–0, 6–1

Events
Singles	men	women
Doubles	men	women
← 2018 ·	Liuzhou Open	· 2020 →

Wang Yafan was the defending champion, but chose not to participate.

Zhu Lin won the title, defeating Arina Rodionova in the final, 2–6, 6–0, 6–1.

== Seeds ==
1. (China) Zhu Lin (champion)
2. (Serbia) Nina Stojanović (first round)
3. (China) Wang Xinyu (first round)
4. (Georgia (country)) Mariam Bolkvadze (quarterfinals, retired)
5. (South Korea) Han Na-lae (second round)
6. (Russia) Valeria Savinykh (first round, retired)
7. (China) Han Xinyun (withdrew)
8. (Serbia) Natalija Kostić (quarterfinals)

== Draw ==
=== Key ===
- Q = Qualifier
- WC = Wild card
- LL = Lucky loser
- Alt = Alternate
- SE = Special exempt
- PR = Protected ranking
- ITF = ITF entry
- JE = Junior exempt
- w/o = Walkover
- r = Retired
- d = Defaulted
- SR = Special ranking

=== Finals ===
Semifinals
1	(China) Zhu Lin	6	7^{7}
(China) Xu Shilin	4	6^{5}
(Australia) Arina Rodionova	7	6
(China) Lu Jiajing	5	0

Final
1	(China) Zhu Lin	2	6	6
(Australia) Arina Rodionova	6	0	1

=== Top half ===
First round
1	(China) L Zhu	6	6
Q	(Poland) U Radwańska	1	3
SE	(Liechtenstein) K von Deichmann	6^{1}	4
Q	(Cyprus) R Șerban	7^{7}	6
Q	(China) M Guo	5	3
Q	(China) F Liu	7	6
WC	(China) X Sun	7	0
6	(Russia) V Savinykh	5	0^{r}
3	(China) Xin Wang	3	6	5
SE	(Russia) A Gasanova	6	1	7
(China) F Xun	7^{7}	3	0
LL	(Serbia) D Radanović	6^{5}	6	6
(China) S Xu	6	6
WC	(China) Y Liu	3	1
WC	(China) C Yuan	3	4
5	(South Korea) N-l Han	6	6

Second round
1	(China) L Zhu	6	7
Q	(Cyprus) R Șerban	1	5
Q	(China) F Liu	6	0
WC	(China) X Sun	0	0^{r}
SE	(Russia) A Gasanova	6^{6}	4
LL	(Serbia) D Radanović	7^{8}	6
(China) S Xu	6	6
5	(South Korea) N-l Han	3	2

Quarterfinals
1	(China) L Zhu	7^{8}	4
Q	(China) F Liu	6^{6}	1^{r}
LL	(Serbia) D Radanović	2	3
(China) S Xu	6	6

Semifinals
1	(China) L Zhu	6	7^{7}
(China) S Xu	4	6^{5}

=== Bottom half ===
First round
LL	(South Korea) D-b Kim	0	2
(Australia) Ar Rodionova	6	6
Q	(Japan) A Omae	6	7
WC	(China) Y Ma	2	5
Q	(China) Z Sun	6	6
(India) A Raina	2	4
(China) Y Yuan	2	2
4	(Georgia (country)) M Bolkvadze	6	6
8	(Serbia) N Kostić	6	6
Q	(Ukraine) D Snigur	2	2
(China) X You	4	6	5
(Bulgaria) A Naydenova	6	4	1^{r}
Q	(China) H Guo	3	5
(Slovenia) D Jakupović	6	7
(China) Jia Lu	6	6
2	(Serbia) N Stojanović	1	4

Second round
(Australia) Ar Rodionova	6	4	6
Q	(Japan) A Omae	2	6	4
Q	(China) Z Sun	2	2
4	(Georgia (country)) M Bolkvadze	6	6
8	(Serbia) N Kostić	6	1	6
(China) X You	3	6	2
(Slovenia) D Jakupović	2	5
(China) Jia Lu	6	7

Quarterfinals
(Australia) Ar Rodionova	4
4	(Georgia (country)) M Bolkvadze	1^{r}
8	(Serbia) N Kostić	2	4
(China) Jia Lu	6	6

Semifinals
(Australia) Ar Rodionova	7	6
(China) Jia Lu	5	0
