= 2018 Liuzhou International Challenger – Men's doubles =

Men's doubles
- 2018 Liuzhou International Challenger

Final
- Champions: (China) Gong Maoxin (China) Zhang Ze
- Runners-up: (Chinese Taipei) Hsieh Cheng-peng (Indonesia) Christopher Rungkat
- Score: 6–3, 2–6, [10–3]

Events
Singles	men	women
Doubles	men	women
- Liuzhou International Challenger

This was the first edition of the men's tournament.

Gong Maoxin and Zhang Ze won the title after defeating Hsieh Cheng-peng and Christopher Rungkat 6–3, 2–6, [10–3] in the final.

== Seeds ==
1. (Chinese Taipei) Hsieh Cheng-peng / (Indonesia) Christopher Rungkat (final)
2. (China) Gong Maoxin / (China) Zhang Ze (champions)
3. (Chinese Taipei) Peng Hsien-yin / (Thailand) Sonchat Ratiwatana (semifinals)
4. (India) Sriram Balaji / (India) Saketh Myneni (semifinals)

== Draw ==
Key

- Q = Qualifier
- WC = Wild card
- LL = Lucky loser
- Alt = Alternate
- ITF = ITF entry
- PR = Protected ranking
- SR = Special ranking
- SE = Special exempt
- JE = Junior exempt
- JR = Junior Accelerator Programme entrant
- CO = College Accelerator Programme entrant
- NG = Next Gen Accelerator Program entrant
- w/o = Walkover
- r = Retired
- d = Defaulted

First round
1	(Chinese Taipei) C-p Hsieh (Indonesia) C Rungkat	6	6
(Spain) P Martínez (Croatia) M Sabanov	2	4
(Kazakhstan) A Nedovyesov (India) R Ramanathan	6^{7}	6	[10]
WC	(China) X Gao (China) F Sun	7^{9}	4	[4]
3	(Chinese Taipei) H-y Peng (Thailand) So Ratiwatana	6	7^{9}
(Japan) G Soeda (Japan) Y Sugita	1	6^{7}
WC	(China) Y Mo (China) Xiao Linang	2	1
(Belgium) K Coppejans (Croatia) I Sabanov	6	6
(India) A Kadhe (Belarus) Y Shyla	6	6
(United Kingdom) L Broady (South Korea) D-h Lee	4	3
(Serbia) M Kecmanović (China) Z Li	1	6	[8]
4	(India) S Balaji (India) S Myneni	6	3	[10]
(Portugal) G Oliveira (Egypt) M Safwat	2	7	[10]
WC	(China) R Te (China) D Wu	6	5	[7]
(Russia) A Pavlioutchenkov (Chinese Taipei) T-h Yang	2	3
2	(China) M Gong (China) Ze Zhang	6	6

Quarterfinals
1	(Chinese Taipei) C-p Hsieh (Indonesia) C Rungkat	6	6
(Kazakhstan) A Nedovyesov (India) R Ramanathan	2	2
3	(Chinese Taipei) H-y Peng (Thailand) So Ratiwatana	4	6	[10]
(Belgium) K Coppejans (Croatia) I Sabanov	6	4	[8]
(India) A Kadhe (Belarus) Y Shyla	6^{5}	1
4	(India) S Balaji (India) S Myneni	7^{7}	6
(Portugal) G Oliveira (Egypt) M Safwat	3	4
2	(China) M Gong (China) Ze Zhang	6	6

Semifinals
1	(Chinese Taipei) C-p Hsieh (Indonesia) C Rungkat	6	4	[10]
3	(Chinese Taipei) H-y Peng (Thailand) So Ratiwatana	2	6	[5]
4	(India) S Balaji (India) S Myneni	7	0	[5]
2	(China) M Gong (China) Ze Zhang	5	6	[10]

Final
1	(Chinese Taipei) C-p Hsieh (Indonesia) C Rungkat	3	6	[3]
2	(China) M Gong (China) Ze Zhang	6	2	[10]
