= 2018 Liuzhou International Challenger – Men's singles =

Men's singles
- 2018 Liuzhou International Challenger

Final
- Champion: (Moldova) Radu Albot
- Runner-up: (Serbia) Miomir Kecmanović
- Score: 6–2, 4–6, 6–3

Events
Singles	men	women
Doubles	men	women
- Liuzhou International Challenger

This was the first edition of the men's tournament.

Radu Albot won the title after defeating Miomir Kecmanović 6–2, 4–6, 6–3 in the final.

== Seeds ==
1. (Moldova) Radu Albot (champion)
2. (India) Ramkumar Ramanathan (first round)
3. (Italy) Thomas Fabbiano (quarterfinals)
4. (Japan) Yūichi Sugita (second round)
5. (Spain) Pedro Martínez (second round)
6. (Serbia) Miomir Kecmanović (final)
7. (India) Prajnesh Gunneswaran (semifinals)
8. (Japan) Tatsuma Ito (second round)

== Draw ==
Key

- Q = Qualifier
- WC = Wild card
- LL = Lucky loser
- Alt = Alternate
- ITF = ITF entry
- PR = Protected ranking
- SR = Special ranking
- SE = Special exempt
- JE = Junior exempt
- JR = Junior Accelerator Programme entrant
- CO = College Accelerator Programme entrant
- NG = Next Gen Accelerator Program entrant
- w/o = Walkover
- r = Retired
- d = Defaulted

=== Finals ===
Semifinals
1	(Moldova) Radu Albot	6	6
7	(India) Prajnesh Gunneswaran	3	3
6	(Serbia) Miomir Kecmanović	3	6	6
(Slovenia) Blaž Kavčič	6	3	4

Final
1	(Moldova) Radu Albot	6	4	6
6	(Serbia) Miomir Kecmanović	2	6	3

=== Top half ===
First round
1	(Moldova) R Albot	7^{9}	7^{7}
WC	(China) R Te	6^{7}	6^{1}
(South Korea) D-h Lee	6	6
(Chinese Taipei) T-h Yang	2	3
(Kazakhstan) A Nedovyesov	6^{2}	6^{3}
WC	(China) D Wu	7^{7}	7^{7}
Q	(India) S Nagal	2	3
8	(Japan) T Ito	6	6
3	(Italy) T Fabbiano	6^{6}	6	6
(Italy) F Gaio	7^{8}	1	2
(China) Ze Zhang	6	6
WC	(China) F Sun	4	3
(Japan) G Soeda	6	3	4
(Egypt) M Safwat	3	6	6
(France) J Tatlot	4	5
7	(India) P Gunneswaran	6	7

Second round
1	(Moldova) R Albot	6	7
(South Korea) D-h Lee	2	5
WC	(China) D Wu	6	6
8	(Japan) T Ito	3	4
3	(Italy) T Fabbiano	6	6
(China) Ze Zhang	4	1
(Egypt) M Safwat	4	4
7	(India) P Gunneswaran	6	6

Quarterfinals
1	(Moldova) R Albot	6	3	6
WC	(China) D Wu	0	6	3
3	(Italy) T Fabbiano	7^{7}	1	3
7	(India) P Gunneswaran	6^{5}	6	6

Semifinals
1	(Moldova) R Albot	6	6
7	(India) P Gunneswaran	3	3

=== Bottom half ===
First round
6	(Serbia) M Kecmanović	6	1
Q	(South Korea) Y-s Chung	1	0^{r}
(United Kingdom) L Broady	2	7	3
(Canada) B Schnur	6	5	6
(Portugal) G Oliveira	6	6^{6}	4
(China) Z Li	1	7^{8}	6
Q	(Japan) Renta Tokuda	2	5
4	(Japan) Y Sugita	6	7
5	(Spain) P Martínez	7	6
WC	(China) Y Wu	5	2
(Belgium) K Coppejans	3	2
(Slovenia) B Kavčič	6	6
(Hungary) M Valkusz	2	6	6
(Canada) F Peliwo	6	2	2
Q	(Spain) A Davidovich Fokina	7^{7}	6
2	(India) R Ramanathan	6^{3}	3

Second round
6	(Serbia) M Kecmanović	6	7^{7}
(Canada) B Schnur	4	6^{5}
(China) Z Li	6	6
4	(Japan) Y Sugita	4	4
5	(Spain) P Martínez	3	4
(Slovenia) B Kavčič	6	6
(Hungary) M Valkusz	2	1
Q	(Spain) A Davidovich Fokina	6	6

Quarterfinals
6	(Serbia) M Kecmanović	7^{9}	4	6
(China) Z Li	6^{7}	6	3
(Slovenia) B Kavčič	7^{7}	2	6
Q	(Spain) A Davidovich Fokina	6^{3}	6	1

Semifinals
6	(Serbia) M Kecmanović	3	6	6
(Slovenia) B Kavčič	6	3	4
