= Sabina Sharipova =

Uzbekistani tennis player

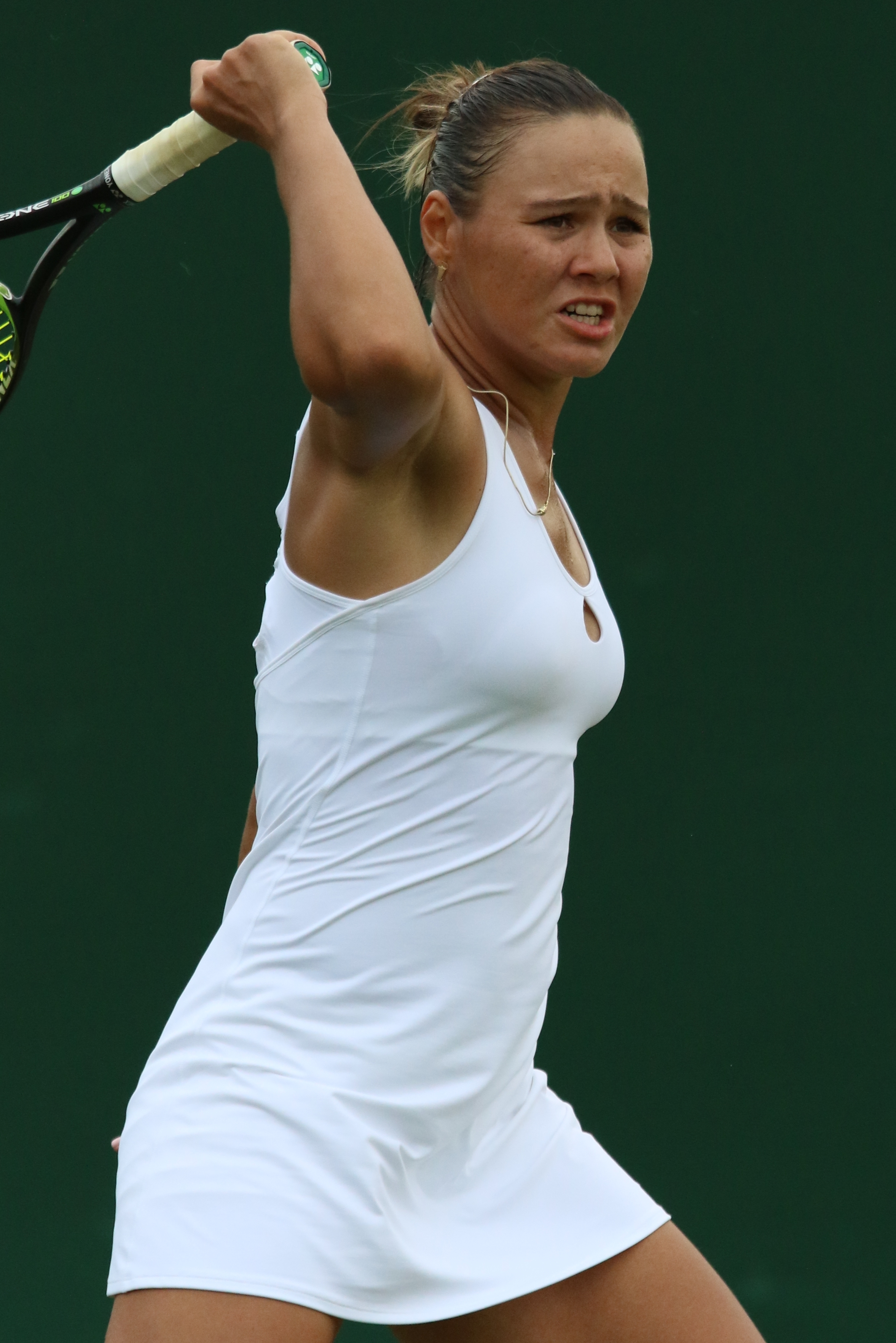
- Sharipova at the 2019 Wimbledon
- Country (sports): Uzbekistan
- Born: 4 September 1994 (age 32) Tashkent, Uzbekistan
- Height: 1.75 m (5 ft 9 in)
- Retired: 2022
- Prize money: $382,475

Singles
- Career record: 323–220
- Career titles: 15 ITF
- Highest ranking: No. 122 (5 November 2018)

Doubles
- Career record: 147–151
- Career titles: 7 ITF
- Highest ranking: No. 197 (9 October 2017)

Team competitions
- Fed Cup: 20–17

Sabina Sharipova (born 4 September 1994) is an Uzbeki former professional tennis player.

Over her career, she won 15 singles titles and seven doubles titles on the ITF Circuit. On 5 November 2018, she reached her best singles ranking of world No. 122. On 9 October 2017, she peaked at No. 197 in the WTA doubles rankings.

Playing for the Uzbekistan Fed Cup team, Sharipova has accumulated a win–loss record of 20–17.

== Performance timeline ==
Key
W	F	SF	QF	#R	RR	Q#	DNQ	A	NH

(W) winner; (F) finalist; (SF) semifinalist; (QF) quarterfinalist; (#R) rounds 4, 3, 2, 1; (RR) round-robin stage; (Q#) qualification round; (DNQ) did not qualify; (A) absent; (NH) not held; (SR) strike rate (events won / competed); (W–L) win–loss record.
To avoid confusion and double counting, these charts are updated at the conclusion of a tournament or when the player's participation has ended.

Tournament	2015	2016	2017	2018	2019	...	2022	W–L
Australian Open	A	A	Q3	Q1	Q2		A	0–0
French Open	A	A	Q1	Q2	Q1		A	0–0
Wimbledon	A	A	A	Q2	Q2		A	0–0
US Open	Q1	Q1	Q1	A	A		A	0–0
Win–Loss	0–0	0–0	0–0	0–0	0–0		0–0	0–0

== ITF Circuit finals ==
Legend
$100,000 tournaments
$80,000 tournaments
$50/60,000 tournaments
$25,000 tournaments
$10/15,000 tournaments

=== Singles: 26 (15 titles, 11 runner-ups) ===
Result	W–L	Date	Tournament	Tier	Surface	Opponent	Score
Loss	0–1	Jul 2009	ITF Shenzhen, China	10k	Hard	(China) Zheng Saisai	5–7, 4–6
Loss	0–2	Jun 2010	ITF Qarshi, Uzbekistan	25k	Hard	(South Korea) Lee Jin-a	2–6, 6–1, 4–6
Win	1–2	Oct 2010	ITF Kuching, Malaysia	10k	Hard	(Indonesia) Sandy Gumulya	6–4, 6–3
Win	2–2	Apr 2012	ITF Andijan, Uzbekistan	10k	Hard	(South Korea) Jang Su-jeong	6–2, 6–4
Loss	2–3	Aug 2012	ITF Ankara, Turkey	10k	Hard	(Romania) Laura Ioana Andrei	1–6, 0–6
Loss	2–4	Feb 2013	ITF Shymkent, Kazakhstan	10k	Hard (i)	(Kyrgyzstan) Ksenia Palkina	6–7^{(3)}, 6–7^{(3)}
Win	3–4	Jun 2013	ITF Qarshi, Uzbekistan	10k	Hard	(China) Yang Yi	6–2, 6–3
Win	4–4	Jun 2013	ITF Qarshi, Uzbekistan	25k	Hard	(India) Ankita Raina	6–3, 6–3
Win	5–4	Nov 2013	ITF Astana, Kazakhstan	10k	Hard (i)	(Russia) Alena Tarasova	7–5, 6–0
Loss	5–5	Jul 2014	ITF Bangkok, Thailand	10k	Hard	(China) Wang Yafan	3–6, 2–6
Loss	5–6	Oct 2014	ITF Bangkok, Thailand	25k	Hard	(Russia) Daria Gavrilova	6–7^{(4)}, 3–6
Win	6–6	Apr 2015	ITF Qarshi, Uzbekistan	25k	Hard	(Russia) Ksenia Lykina	6–2, 6–3
Loss	6–7	Jun 2015	Fergana Challenger, Uzbekistan	25k	Hard	(Russia) Anastasiya Komardina	2–6, 6–1, 4–6
Win	7–7	Feb 2016	Delhi Open, India	25k	Hard	(Serbia) Nina Stojanović	3–6, 6–2, 6–4
Win	8–7	May 2016	ITF Andijan, Uzbekistan	25k	Hard	(Russia) Veronika Kudermetova	7–5, 6–0
Loss	8–8	Jun 2016	Fergana Challenger, Uzbekistan	25k	Hard	(Russia) Polina Monova	3–6, 6–0, 4–6
Win	9–8	Sep 2016	ITF Guiyang, China	25k	Hard	(China) Guo Hanyu	6–7^{(1)}, 7–6^{(0)}, 6–4
Win	10–8	Jun 2017	Fergana Challenger, Uzbekistan	25k	Hard	(Russia) Elena Rybakina	6–4, 7–6^{(5)}
Loss	10–9	Sep 2017	ITF Guiyang, China	25k	Hard	(Belarus) Lidziya Marozava	2–6, 4–6
Loss	10–10	Mar 2018	ITF Xiamen, China	15k	Hard	(China) Gao Xinyu	1–6, 2–6
Win	11–10	Apr 2018	Lale Cup İstanbul, Turkey	60k	Hard	(Russia) Elena Rybakina	7–6^{(0)}, 6–4
Win	12–10	Jun 2018	ITF Andijan, Uzbekistan	25k	Hard	(Slovenia) Kaja Juvan	6–4, 6–2
Win	13–10	Jun 2018	ITF Namangan, Uzbekistan	25k	Hard	(Belarus) Iryna Shymanovich	6–1, 6–1
Loss	13–11	Jul 2018	President's Cup, Kazakhstan	80k	Hard	(Georgia (country)) Ekaterine Gorgodze	4–6, 1–6
Win	14–11	Oct 2019	ITF Antalya, Turkey	W15	Hard	(Germany) Anja Wildgruber	6–3, 6–1
Win	15–11	Jan 2020	ITF Monastir, Tunisia	W15	Hard	(France) Mallaurie Noël	7–6^{(5)}, 6–3

=== Doubles: 20 (7 titles, 13 runner-ups) ===
Result	W–L	Date	Tournament	Tier	Surface	Partner	Opponents	Score
Win	1–0	Oct 2010	ITF Kuching, Malaysia	10k	Hard	(Indonesia) Sandy Gumulya	(India) Rushmi Chakravarthi (France) Élodie Rogge-Dietrich	6–3, 6–2
Loss	1–1	Jun 2011	ITF Astana, Kazakhstan	25k	Hard	(Serbia) Tamara Čurović	(Ukraine) Veronika Kapshay (Russia) Ekaterina Yashina	6–2, 3–6, [13–15]
Loss	1–2	Apr 2012	ITF Andijan, Uzbekistan	10k	Hard	(Russia) Ekaterina Yashina	(Uzbekistan) Albina Khabibulina (Ukraine) Anastasiya Vasylyeva	0–6, 2–6
Win	2–2	May 2012	ITF Almaty, Kazakhstan	10k	Hard	(Russia) Ekaterina Yashina	(Uzbekistan) Albina Khabibulina (Ukraine) Anastasiya Vasylyeva	6–4, 3–6, [10–3]
Loss	2–3	Feb 2013	ITF Shymkent, Kazakhstan	10k	Hard	(Kazakhstan) Kamila Kerimbayeva	(Ukraine) Diana Bogoliy (Russia) Alena Tarasova	4–6, 6–1, [4–10]
Loss	2–4	May 2013	ITF Qarshi, Uzbekistan	10k	Hard	(Russia) Ekaterina Yashina	(Uzbekistan) Albina Khabibulina (Ukraine) Alyona Sotnikova	3–6, 5–7
Win	3–4	May 2014	ITF Bukhara, Uzbekistan	25k	Hard	(Ukraine) Veronika Kapshay	(Uzbekistan) Nigina Abduraimova (Uzbekistan) Akgul Amanmuradova	6–4, 6–4
Loss	3–5	May 2016	ITF La Marsa, Tunisia	25k	Clay	(Russia) Victoria Kan	(Russia) Vitalia Diatchenko (Kazakhstan) Galina Voskoboeva	3–6, 6–1, [10–12]
Loss	3–6	May 2016	ITF Andijan, Uzbekistan	25k	Hard	(Russia) Victoria Kan	(Czech Republic) Barbora Stefkova (Ukraine) Anastasiya Vasylyeva	3–6, 6–4, [7–10]
Loss	3–7	Oct 2016	Suzhou Ladies Open, China	50k	Hard	(United States) Jacqueline Cako	(Japan) Hiroko Kuwata (Japan) Akiko Omae	1–6, 3–6
Loss	3–8	Oct 2016	Liuzhou Open, China	50k	Hard	(United States) Jacqueline Cako	(Russia) Veronika Kudermetova (Russia) Aleksandra Pospelova	2–6, 4–6
Loss	3–9	Dec 2016	Ankara Cup, Turkey	50k	Hard (i)	(Russia) Ekaterina Yashina	(Russia) Anna Blinkova (Belarus) Lidziya Marozava	6–4, 3–6, [9–11]
Loss	3–10	Jun 2017	Fergana Challenger, Uzbekistan	25k	Hard	(Russia) Ksenia Lykina	(Uzbekistan) Nigina Abduraimova (Russia) Anastasia Frolova	6–7^{(7)}, 5–7
Win	4–10	Sep 2017	ITF Guiyang, China	25k	Hard	(Belarus) Lidziya Marozava	(China) Jiang Xinyu (China) Tang Qianhui	6–2, 6–3
Loss	4–11	Mar 2019	Pingshan Open, China	W60	Hard	(Japan) Hiroko Kuwata	(Chinese Taipei) Liang En-shuo (China) Xun Fangying	4–6, 1–6
Win	5–11	Jun 2019	ITF Nonthaburi, Thailand	W25	Hard	(Mexico) Victoria Rodríguez	(United States) Lorraine Guillermo (United States) Maegan Manasse	6–3, 6–4
Win	6–11	Feb 2021	ITF Shymkent, Kazakhstan	W15	Hard (i)	(Russia) Ekaterina Kazionova	(Russia) Daria Mishina (Russia) Noel Saidenova	7–5, 2–6, [10–4]
Loss	6–12	Apr 2021	ITF Shymkent, Kazakhstan	W15	Hard	(Russia) Ekaterina Yashina	(Russia) Anzhelika Isaeva (Russia) Ekaterina Makarova	6–7^{(4)}, 3–6
Win	7–12	Jun 2021	ITF Monastir, Tunisia	W15	Hard	(Croatia) Mariana Dražić	(Japan) Saki Imamura (South Korea) Shin Ji-ho	6–7^{(1)}, 6–4, [10–0]
Loss	7–13	Aug 2021	ITF Almaty, Kazakhstan	W25	Clay	(Netherlands) Stéphanie Visscher	(Uzbekistan) Nigina Abduraimova (Russia) Daria Mishina	6–4, 4–6, [3–10]
