= Liuzhou Open =

Defunct tennis tournament
- Event name: Liuzhou Open; Liuzhou International Challenger; Bank of Liuzhou Cup
- Location: Liuzhou, China
- Venue: Liuzhou Tennis Center
- Surface: Hard / outdoors
ATP Tour
- Category: ATP Challenger Tour
- Draw: 32S / 32Q / 16D
- Prize money: $50,000
WTA Tour
- Category: ITF Women's Circuit
- Draw: 32S / 32Q / 16D
- Prize money: $60,000

The Liuzhou Open was a professional tennis tournament played on hardcourts. It was part of the International Tennis Federation (ITF) Women's Circuit, and since 2018 part of the ATP Challenger Tour. It was held annually in Liuzhou, China from 2016 until 2019.

== Past finals ==
=== Men's singles ===
Year	Champion	Runner-up	Score
2019	(Spain) Alejandro Davidovich Fokina	(Uzbekistan) Denis Istomin	6–3, 5–7, 7–6^{(7–5)}
2018	(Moldova) Radu Albot	(Serbia) Miomir Kecmanović	6–2, 4–6, 6–3

=== Women's singles ===
Year	Champion	Runner-up	Score
2019	(China) Zhu Lin	(Australia) Arina Rodionova	2–6, 6–0, 6–1
2018	(China) Wang Yafan	(South Korea) Han Na-lae	6–4, 6–2
2017	(China) Wang Yafan	(Japan) Nao Hibino	3–6, 6–4, 3–3, ret.
2016	(Serbia) Nina Stojanović	(South Korea) Jang Su-jeong	6–3, 6–4

=== Men's doubles ===
Year	Champions	Runners-up	Score
2019	(Russia) Mikhail Elgin (Uzbekistan) Denis Istomin	(South Korea) Nam Ji-sung (South Korea) Song Min-kyu	3–6, 6–4, [10–6]
2018	(China) Gong Maoxin (China) Zhang Ze	(Chinese Taipei) Hsieh Cheng-peng (Indonesia) Christopher Rungkat	6–3, 2–6, [10–3]

=== Women's doubles ===
Year	Champions	Runners-up	Score
2019	(China) Jiang Xinyu (China) Tang Qianhui	(India) Ankita Raina (Netherlands) Rosalie van der Hoek	6–4, 6–4
2018	(Hong Kong) Eudice Chong (China) Ye Qiuyu	(China) Kang Jiaqi (South Korea) Lee So-ra	7–5, 6–3
2017	(China) Han Xinyun (Japan) Makoto Ninomiya	(United States) Jacqueline Cako (United Kingdom) Laura Robson	6–2, 7–6^{(7–3)}
2016	(Russia) Veronika Kudermetova (Russia) Aleksandra Pospelova	(United States) Jacqueline Cako (Uzbekistan) Sabina Sharipova	6–2, 6–4
