= Jacqueline Cako =

American tennis player

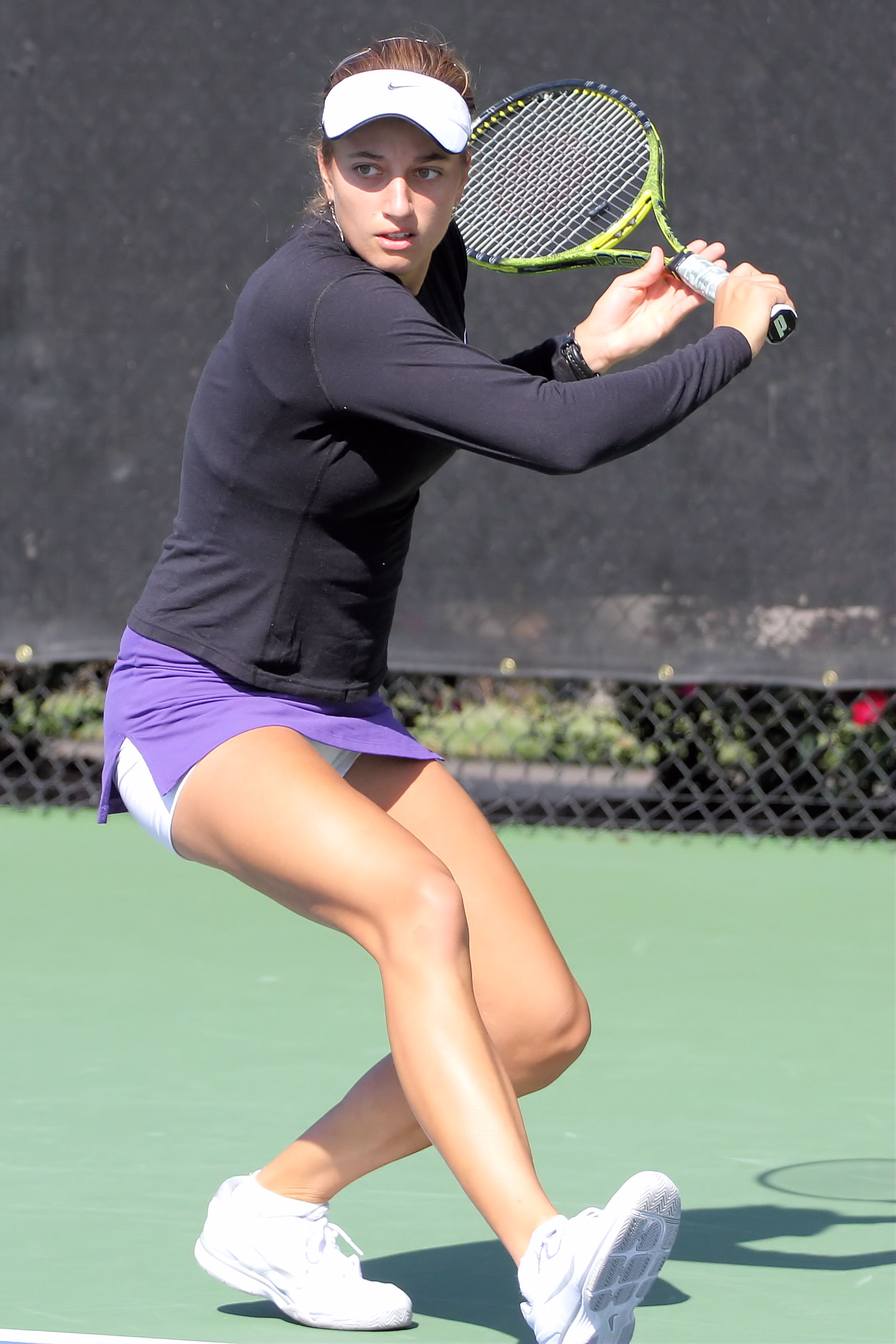
- Cako at the 2011 Grapevine Women's Classic
- Country (sports): United States
- Born: August 30, 1991 (age 35) Brier, Washington
- Height: 5 ft 10 in (1.78 m)
- Prize money: $237,453

Singles
- Career record: 242–237
- Career titles: 2 ITF
- Highest ranking: No. 172 (October 16, 2017)

Grand Slam singles results
- Wimbledon: Q1 (2017)

Doubles
- Career record: 200–195
- Career titles: 12 ITF
- Highest ranking: No. 87 (April 16, 2018)

Grand Slam doubles results
- US Open: 2R (2017)

Grand Slam mixed doubles results
- US Open: 1R (2014)

Jacqueline Cako (born August 30, 1991) is an American former tennis player of Hungarian descent.

In her career, Cako won two singles and 12 doubles titles on the ITF Women's Circuit. In October 2017, she reached her best singles ranking of world No. 172. In April 2018, she peaked at No. 87 in the doubles rankings.

== Grand Slam performance timeline ==
Key
W	F	SF	QF	#R	RR	Q#	DNQ	A	NH

(W) winner; (F) finalist; (SF) semifinalist; (QF) quarterfinalist; (#R) rounds 4, 3, 2, 1; (RR) round-robin stage; (Q#) qualification round; (DNQ) did not qualify; (A) absent; (NH) not held; (SR) strike rate (events won / competed); (W–L) win–loss record.

=== Doubles ===
Tournament	2016	2017	2018	2019	2020	2021	W–L
Australian Open	A	A	A	A	A	A	0–0
French Open	A	A	A	A	A	A	0–0
Wimbledon	A	A	A	A	NH	A	0–0
US Open	1R	2R	A	A	A	A	1–2
Win–Loss	0–1	1–1	0–0	0–0	0–0	0–0	1–2

== WTA 125 finals ==
=== Doubles: 1 (runner-up) ===
Result	Date	Tournament	Surface	Partner	Opponents	Score
Loss	Apr 2017	Zhengzhou Open, China	Hard	(Israel) Julia Glushko	(China) Han Xinyun (China) Zhu Lin	5–7, 1–6

== ITF Circuit finals ==
=== Singles: 6 (2 titles, 4 runner-ups) ===
Legend $25,000 tournaments $10,000 tournaments	Finals by surface Hard (2–3) Clay (0–1)

Result	W–L	Date	Tournament	Surface	Opponent	Score
Win	1–0	Oct 2008	ITF Southlake, United States	Hard	(United States) Ashley Weinhold	6–3, 4–6, 6–3
Win	2–0	Jun 2009	ITF Wichita, United States	Hard	(United States) Courtney Dolehide	6–2, 6–3
Loss	2–1	May 2010	ITF Hilton Head, United States	Hard	(United States) Alexis King	2–6, 2–6
Loss	2–2	Jun 2010	ITF Kristinehamn, Sweden	Clay	(Slovakia) Lenka Wienerová	2–6, 6–3, 6–7^{(2)}
Loss	2–3	May 2017	ITF Hua Hin, Thailand	Hard	(Thailand) Peangtarn Plipuech	4–6, 2–6
Loss	2–4	Sep 2017	ITF Hua Hin, Thailand	Hard	(Netherlands) Arantxa Rus	1–6, 3–6

=== Doubles: 28 (12 titles, 16 runner-ups) ===
Legend $100,000 tournaments $75,000 tournaments $50/60,000 tournaments $25,000 tournaments $10,000 tournaments	Finals by surface Hard (11–12) Clay (1–4)

Result	W–L	Date	Tournament	Surface	Partner	Opponents	Score
Win	1–0	Jun 2009	ITF Hilton Head, United States	Hard	(United States) Alison Riske	(United States) Natalie Pluskota (United States) Caitlin Whoriskey	6–3, 3–6, [10–6]
Loss	1–1	Jul 2009	Lexington Challenger, US	Hard	(United States) Alison Riske	(Chinese Taipei) Chang Kai-chen (United States) Tetiana Luzhanska	3–6, 2–6
Win	2–1	May 2010	ITF Hilton Head, US	Hard	(United States) Erica Krisan	(United States) Brooke Bolender (United States) Lauren Herring	6–1, 6–4
Loss	2–2	Jul 2010	Lexington Challenger, US	Hard	(United States) Story Tweedie-Yates	(Australia) Bojana Bobusic (United States) Christina Fusano	4–6, 2–6
Win	3–2	Jun 2012	ITF Bethany Beach, US	Clay	(United States) Sanaz Marand	(Ukraine) Anastasia Kharchenko (Russia) Nika Kukharchuk	6–1, 6–2
Loss	3–3	Jun 2012	ITF Williamsburg, US	Clay	(United States) Whitney Jones	(United Kingdom) Laura Deigman (Republic of Ireland) Julia Moriarty	4–6, 4–6
Loss	3–4	Jun 2012	ITF Buffalo, US	Clay	(Oman) Fatma Al-Nabhani	(Russia) Nika Kukharchuk (United States) Jamie Loeb	6–1, 3–6, [8–10]
Loss	3–5	Jul 2012	Vancouver Open, Canada	Hard	(United States) Natalie Pluskota	(Israel) Julia Glushko (Australia) Olivia Rogowska	4–6, 7–5, [7–10]
Win	4–5	Sep 2012	ITF Redding, US	Hard	(United States) Sanaz Marand	(United States) Macall Harkins (United States) Hsu Chieh-yu	7–6^{(5)}, 7–5
Win	5–5	Oct 2012	ITF Rock Hill, US	Hard	(United States) Natalie Pluskota	(United States) Hsu Chieh-yu (United States) Chiara Scholl	6–2, 6–3
Win	6–5	Nov 2012	ITF Phoenix, US	Hard	(United States) Natalie Pluskota	(Canada) Eugenie Bouchard (Norway) Ulrikke Eikeri	6–3, 2–6, [10–4]
Loss	6–6	Jul 2013	Vancouver Open, Canada	Hard	(United States) Natalie Pluskota	(Canada) Sharon Fichman (Ukraine) Maryna Zanevska	2–6, 2–6
Loss	6–7	Sep 2013	ITF Redding, US	Hard	(United States) Allie Kiick	(United States) Robin Anderson (United States) Lauren Embree	4–6, 7–5, [7–10]
Loss	6–8	Jan 2014	ITF Vero Beach, US	Clay	(United States) Sanaz Marand	(Russia) Irina Khromacheva (United States) Allie Will	5–7, 3–6
Loss	6–9	Feb 2015	Midland Tennis Classic, US	Hard (i)	(United States) Sachia Vickery	(France) Julie Coin (United Kingdom) Emily Webley-Smith	6–4, 6–7^{(4)}, [9–11]
Win	7–9	Feb 2015	ITF Surprise, US	Hard	(United States) Kaitlyn Christian	(United Kingdom) Johanna Konta (United States) Maria Sanchez	6–4, 5–7, [10–7]
Loss	7–10	May 2015	ITF Raleigh, US	Clay	(Australia) Sally Peers	(United States) Jan Abaza (Poland) Justyna Jegiołka	6–7^{(4)}, 6–4, [7–10]
Loss	7–11	Jun 2015	ITF Sumter, US	Hard	(United States) Danielle Lao	(United States) Alexandra Mueller (United States) Ashley Weinhold	7–5, 5–7, [6–10]
Win	8–11	Feb 2016	ITF Surprise, US	Hard	(United States) Danielle Lao	(United States) Emina Bektas (United States) Sarah Lee	6–2, 4–6, [10–8]
Loss	8–12	Aug 2016	ITF Fort Worth, US	Hard	(United States) Danielle Lao	(Chinese Taipei) Hsu Chieh-yu (South Africa) Chanel Simmonds	0–6, 4–6
Loss	8–13	Oct 2016	Suzhou Ladies Open, China	Hard	(Uzbekistan) Sabina Sharipova	(Japan) Hiroko Kuwata (Japan) Akiko Omae	1–6, 3–6
Loss	8–14	Oct 2016	Liuzhou Open, China	Hard	(Uzbekistan) Sabina Sharipova	(Russia) Veronika Kudermetova (Russia) Aleksandra Pospelova	2–6, 4–6
Win	9–14	Oct 2016	ITF Chenzhou, China	Hard	(Bulgaria) Aleksandrina Naydenova	(Russia) Angelina Gabueva (Georgia (country)) Sofia Shapatava	3–6, 6–4, [10–6]
Win	10–14	Oct 2017	Suzhou Ladies Open, China	Hard	(Serbia) Nina Stojanović	(Japan) Eri Hozumi (Japan) Miyu Kato	2–6, 7–5, [10–2]
Loss	10–15	Oct 2017	Liuzhou Open, China	Hard	(United Kingdom) Laura Robson	(China) Xinyun Han (Japan) Makoto Ninomiya	2–6, 6–7^{(3)}
Win	11–15	Nov 2017	Shenzhen Longhua Open, China	Hard	(Serbia) Nina Stojanović	(Japan) Shuko Aoyama (China) Yang Zhaoxuan	6–4, 6–2
Loss	11–16	Feb 2018	ITF Surprise, US	Hard	(United States) Caitlin Whoriskey	(Japan) Misaki Doi (Belgium) Yanina Wickmayer	6–2, 3–6, [8–10]
Win	12–16	Oct 2019	ITF Claremont, US	Hard	(Russia) Angelina Gabueva	(United States) Hind Abdelouahid (United States) Alyssa Tobita	6–3, 6–7^{(4)}, [10–4]
