= 2013 ITF Women's Circuit – Sanya =

- Date: 9–15 September
- Edition: 3rd
- Prize money: $50,000
- Surface: Hard
- Location: Sanya, China

Champions

Singles
- (Czech Republic) Karolína Plíšková

Doubles
- (China) Sun Ziyue / (China) Xu Shilin
← 2012 ·	ITF Women's Circuit – Sanya	· 2014 →

The 2013 ITF Women's Circuit – Sanya was a professional tennis tournament played on outdoor hard courts. It was the third edition of the tournament which was part of the 2013 ITF Women's Circuit, offering a total of $50,000 in prize money. It took place in Sanya, China, on 9–15 September 2013.

== WTA entrants ==
=== Seeds ===
Country	Player	Rank^{1}	Seed
CZE	Karolína Plíšková	72	1
CHN	Zhang Shuai	104	2
CHN	Duan Yingying	133	3
CHN	Zheng Saisai	150	4
SRB	Jovana Jakšić	159	5
KAZ	Zarina Diyas	196	6
CHN	Wang Qiang	216	7
THA	Varatchaya Wongteanchai	250	8

- ^{1} Rankings as of 26 August 2013

=== Other entrants ===
The following players received wildcards into the singles main draw:

- (China) Sun Ziyue
- (China) Tian Ran
- (China) Wang Yafan
- (China) Xu Shilin

The following players received entry from the qualifying draw:

- (Chinese Taipei) Hsu Wen-hsin
- (China) Liang Chen
- (China) Tang Haochen
- (China) Zhao Yijing

The following player received entry into the singles main draw as a lucky loser:

- (China) Zhao Di

== Champions ==
=== Singles ===
- (Czech Republic) Karolína Plíšková def. (China) Zheng Saisai 6–3, 6–4

=== Doubles ===
- (China) Sun Ziyue / (China) Xu Shilin def. (China) Yang Zhaoxuan / (China) Zhao Yijing 6–7^{(5–7)}, 6–3, [10–3]
