= Karolína Plíšková career statistics =

Career finals
Discipline	Type	Won	Lost	Total
Singles	Grand Slam	–	2	2
Singles	WTA Finals (Note: Formerly known as WTA Tour Championships until 2014.)	–	–	0
Singles	WTA Elite (Note: Formerly known as WTA Tournament of Champions until 2015.)	–	1	1
Singles	WTA 1000 (Note: The WTA Premier Mandatory & 5 were reclassified as WTA 1000 tournaments in 2021.)	2	5	7
Singles	WTA 500 (Note: Includes WTA 500 and WTA 250 tournaments. The WTA Premier tournaments were reclassified as WTA 500 tournaments in 2021, while the WTA International tournaments were reclassified as WTA 250 tournaments the same year .)	9	4	13
Singles	WTA 250	6	5	11
Singles	Olympics	–	–	0
Singles	Total	17	17	34
Doubles	Grand Slam	–	–	0
Doubles	WTA Finals	–	–	0
Doubles	WTA 1000	–	1	1
Doubles	WTA 500	1	–	1
Doubles	WTA 250	4	1	5
Doubles	Olympics	–	–	0
Doubles	Total	5	2	7

This is a list of career statistics of Czech professional tennis player Karolína Plíšková since her professional debut in 2006. Plíšková has won 17 singles titles, including two WTA Premier 5 titles in Cincinnati and Rome. Plíšková has also won five doubles titles, including one at Premier level with fellow Czech Barbora Strýcová.

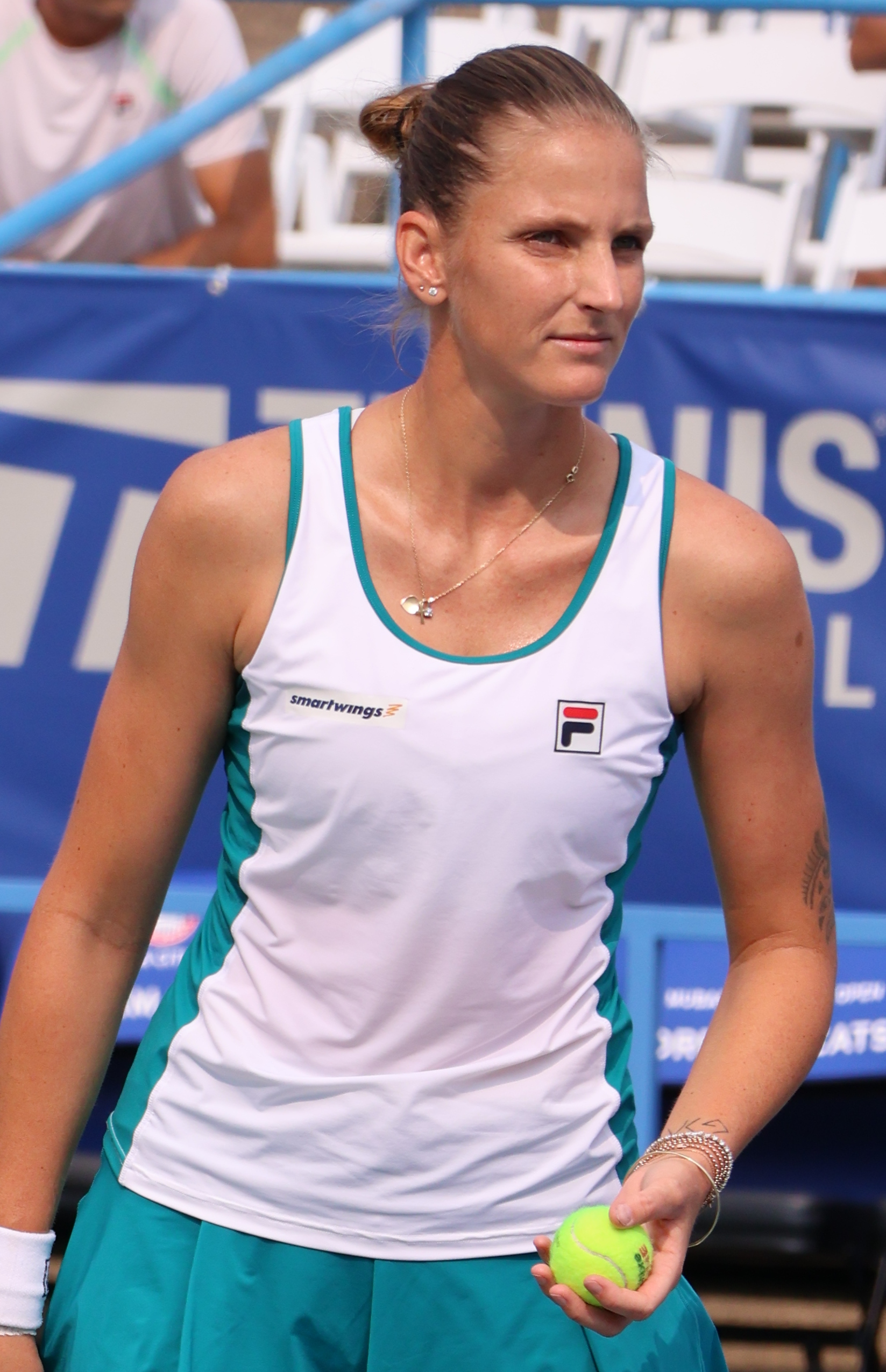
Plíšková at the 2023 Washington Open.

== Performance timelines ==
Key
W	F	SF	QF	#R	RR	Q#	P#	DNQ	A	Z#	PO	G	S	B	NMS	NTI	P	NH

(W) winner; (F) finalist; (SF) semifinalist; (QF) quarterfinalist; (#R) rounds 4, 3, 2, 1; (RR) round-robin stage; (Q#) qualification round; (P#) preliminary round; (DNQ) did not qualify; (A) absent; (Z#) Davis/Fed Cup Zonal Group (with number indication) or (PO) play-off; (G) gold, (S) silver or (B) bronze Olympic/Paralympic medal; (NMS) not a Masters tournament; (NTI) not a Tier I tournament; (P) postponed; (NH) not held; (SR) strike rate (events won / competed); (W–L) win–loss record.
To avoid confusion and double counting, these charts are updated at the conclusion of a tournament or when the player's participation has ended.

Only main-draw results in WTA Tour, Grand Slam tournaments, Billie Jean King Cup (Fed Cup), United Cup, Hopman Cup and Olympic Games are included in win–loss records.

=== Singles ===
Current through the 2026 Wimbledon Championships.

Tournament	2007	2008	2009	2010	2011	2012	2013	2014	2015	2016	2017	2018	2019	2020	2021	2022	2023	2024	2025	2026	SR	W–L	Win%
Grand Slam tournaments
Australian Open	A	A	A	A	Q1	Q1	1R	2R	3R	3R	QF	QF	SF	3R	3R	A	QF	1R	A	3R	0 / 12	28–12	70%
French Open	A	A	A	A	Q2	1R	1R	2R	2R	1R	SF	3R	3R	2R	2R	2R	1R	1R	A	Q2	0 / 13	14–13	52%
Wimbledon	A	A	A	Q1	A	1R	2R	2R	2R	2R	2R	4R	4R	NH	F	2R	1R	1R	A	2R	0 / 13	19–13	59%
US Open	A	A	A	Q1	Q1	Q2	1R	3R	1R	F	QF	QF	4R	2R	QF	QF	2R	2R	A		0 / 12	30–12	71%
Win–Loss	0–0	0–0	0–0	0–0	0–0	0–2	1–4	5–4	4–4	9–4	14–4	13–4	13–4	4–3	13–4	6–3	5–4	2–4	0–0	3–2	0 / 50	91–50	65%
Year-end championships																							
WTA Finals	DNQ									RR	SF	SF	SF	NH	RR	DNQ					0 / 5	9–9	50%
WTA Elite Trophy	NH		DNQ					RR	F	A	A	A	A	NH			DNQ				0 / 2	3–2	60%
National representation
Billie Jean King Cup (Note: Formerly known as Fed Cup until 2020.)	A	A	A	A	A	A	A	A	W	W	SF	W	QF	A (Note: Edition is split into the two years due to COVID-19.)		SF	A	A	A		3 / 6	11–7	61%
Summer Olympics	NH	A	Not Held			A	Not Held			A	Not Held				3R	Not Held		A	Not Held		0 / 1	2–1	67%
WTA 1000 tournaments
Qatar Open	NT1	A	Not Held		NT1	A	A	2R	NT1	1R	NT1	3R	NT1	3R	NT1	A	NT1	SF (Note: Withdraw during the tournament. Not counted as a loss.)	A	3R	0 / 6	9–5	64%
Dubai Championships	Not Held		A	A	A	Not Tier 1			F	NT1	2R	NT1	QF	NT1	3R	NT1	QF	3R	A	A	0 / 5	13–5	72%
Indian Wells Open	A	A	A	A	A	Q1	Q1	3R	4R	SF	SF	QF	QF	NH	3R	2R	4R	1R	A	A	0 / 10	21–10	68%
Miami Open	A	A	A	A	A	A	2R	1R	QF	2R	SF	QF	F	NH	3R	2R	3R	1R	A	A	0 / 11	18–11	62%
Madrid Open	Not Held		A	A	A	A	Q1	1R	2R	2R	2R	SF	2R	NH	2R	1R	A	A	A	QF	0 / 9	13–9	59%
Italian Open	A	A	A	A	A	A	A	A	1R	1R	QF	2R	W	F	F	2R	2R	A	A	4R	1 / 10	18–9	67%
Canadian Open	A	A	A	A	A	A	Q1	2R	1R	3R	QF	2R	QF	NH	F	SF	2R	2R	A		0 / 10	17–10	63%
Cincinnati Open	Not Tier 1		A	A	A	Q2	Q2	Q1	3R	W	SF	2R	QF	2R	SF	2R	1R	2R	A		1 / 10	16–9	64%
Guadalajara Open	Not Held															1R	2R	Not Tier 1			0 / 2	1–2	33%
Pan Pacific/Wuhan Open (Note: In 2014, the Pan Pacific Open was downgraded to a Premier event and replaced by the Wuhan Open.)	A	A	A	A	1R	A	A	3R	QF	3R	QF	2R	3R	Not Held				A	A		0 / 7	8–7	53%
China Open	Not Tier 1		A	A	A	A	Q2	1R	1R	3R	3R	3R	1R	Not Held			A	A	A		0 / 6	6–6	50%
Win–Loss																							
Career statistics
	2007	2008	2009	2010	2011	2012	2013	2014	2015	2016	2017	2018	2019	2020	2021	2022	2023	2024	2025	2026	Career		
Tournaments	1	1	1	1	3	6	16	26	26	22	20	23	19	9	18	19	20	16			Career total: 247		
Titles	0	0	0	0	0	0	1	2	1	2	3	2	4	1	0	0	0	1			Career total: 17		
Finals	0	0	0	0	0	0	1	5	6	4	3	3	5	2	3	0	0				Career total: 34		
Hard Win–Loss	0–0	0–0	0–0	0–0	0–2	1–3	8–8	36–18	40–20	28–15	39–12	32–16	35–12	9–6	23–12	11–12	14–13	15–10			11 / 160	290–157	65%
Clay Win–Loss	0–1	2–1	0–1	0–1	0–1	0–2	2–5	7–4	7–3	6–5	9–5	12–4	8–3	5–2	8–4	5–6	2–3	1–3			3 / 56	74–54	58%
Grass Win–Loss	0–0	0–0	0–0	0–0	0–0	0–1	1–2	1–2	6–3	10–3	5–1	5–3	9–2	0–0	6–3	3–3	1–3	4–3			3 / 30	51–27	65%
Overall Win–Loss	0–1	2–1	0–1	0–1	0–3	1–6	11–15	44–24	53–26	44–23	53–18	49–23	52–17	14–8	37–19	19–21	17–19	20–16			17 / 246	411–237	63%
Win %	0%	67%	0%	0%	0%	14%	42%	65%	67%	66%	75%	68%	75%	64%	66%	48%	47%	56%			Career total: 63.43%		
Year-end ranking (Note: 2006: WTA ranking – 1168.)	860	427	228	203	159	120	67	24	11	6	4	8	2	6	4	32	37	41			$25,385,484		

=== Doubles ===
Current through the 2024 Australian Open.

Tournament	2007	2008	2009	2010	2011	2012	2013	2014	2015	2016	2017	2018	2019	2020	2021	2022	2023	2024	2025	2026	SR	W–L	Win%
Grand Slam tournaments
Australian Open	A	A	A	A	A	A	A	1R	1R	SF	1R	A	A	A	A	A	A	A			0 / 4	4–4	50%
French Open	A	A	A	A	A	A	1R	1R	2R	3R	A	A	A	A	QF	A	A				0 / 5	6–5	55%
Wimbledon	A	A	A	A	A	Q2	1R	1R	1R	SF	A	A	A	NH	A	A	A				0 / 4	4–4	50%
US Open	A	A	A	A	A	1R	1R	1R	1R	3R	A	A	A	A	A	A	3R				0 / 6	4–6	40%
Win–Loss	0–0	0–0	0–0	0–0	0–0	0–1	0–3	0–4	1–4	12–4	0–1	0–0	0–0	0–0	3–1	0–0	2–1	0–0			0 / 19	18–19	49%
Year-end championships
WTA Finals	DNQ									RR	DNQ			NH	DNQ						0 / 1	0–1	0%
National representation
Summer Olympics	NH	A	Not Held			A	Not Held			A	Not Held				2R	Not Held					0 / 1	1–1	50%
Billie Jean King Cup	A	A	A	A	A	A	A	A	W	W	SF	W	QF	A		SF	A				3 / 6	4–1	80%
WTA 1000 tournaments
Qatar Open	NT1	A	NT1	NT1	NT1	A	A	2R	NT1	A	NT1	A	NT1	A	NT1	A	NT1				0 / 1	1–1	40%
Dubai Championships	Not Held		A	A	A	NT1	NT1	NT1	1R	NT1	A	NT1	A	NT1	2R	NT1					0 / 2	1–2	
Indian Wells Open	A	A	A	A	A	A	A	A	1R	F	1R	1R	1R	NH	A	A	1R				0 / 6	4–6	40%
Miami Open	A	A	A	A	A	A	A	A	1R	1R	A	A	A	NH	A	A	A				0 / 2	0–2	0%
Madrid Open	Not Held		A	A	A	A	A	A	SF	1R	A	2R	A	NH	A	2R (Note: Withdraw during the tournament. Not count as a loss.)	A				0 / 4	5–3	63%
Italian Open	A	A	A	A	A	A	A	A	A	2R	1R	2R	1R	A	A	2R	A				0 / 5	3–5	38%
Canadian Open	A	A	A	A	A	A	A	2R	SF	2R	2R	2R	2R	NH	2R	A	1R				0 / 8	9–7	56%
Cincinnati Open	Not Tier 1		A	A	A	A	A	2R	1R	SF	A	A	SF	A	A	A	2R				0 / 5	8–4	67%
Guadalajara Open	Not Held															A	A				0 / 0	0–0	–
Pan Pacific / Wuhan Open	A	A	A	A	A	A	A	1R	QF	2R	A	A	A	Not Held							0 / 3	3–3	50%
China Open	Not Tier 1		A	A	2R	A	A	1R	QF	QF	A	A	SF	Not Held			A				0 / 5	7–5	58%
Win–Loss																							
Career statistics
	2007	2008	2009	2010	2011	2012	2013	2014	2015	2016	2017	2018	2019	2020	2021	2022	2023	2024	2025	2026	Career		
Tournaments	1	1	0	1	2	6	10	20	16	15	4	6	6	2	5	3	4	0			Career total: 102		
Titles	0	0	0	0	0	0	1	3	0	1	0	0	0	0	0	0	0	0			Career total: 5		
Finals	0	0	0	0	0	0	2	3	0	2	0	0	0	0	0	0	0	0			Career total: 7		
Overall Win–Loss	0–1	0–1	0–0	0–1	1–2	7–6	14–9	21–16	15–16	33–13	1–4	5–4	9–5	2–2	8–5	2–3	3–3	0–0			5 / 102	121–91	57%
Year-end ranking	917	818	n/a	364	130	102	77	46	46	11	414	208	96	86	124	329							

=== Mixed doubles ===
Tournament	2014	SR	W–L	Win%
Australian Open	A	0 / 0	0–0	0%
French Open	A	0 / 0	0–0	0%
Wimbledon	2R	0 / 1	1–1	50%
US Open	A	0 / 0	0–0	0%
Win–loss	0–0	0 / 1	1–1	50%

== Grand Slam tournament finals ==
=== Singles: 2 (2 runner-ups) ===
Result	Year	Tournament	Surface	Opponent	Score	Ref
Loss	2016	US Open	Hard	(Germany) Angelique Kerber	3–6, 6–4, 4–6	
Loss	2021	Wimbledon	Grass	(Australia) Ashleigh Barty	3–6, 7–6^{(7–4)}, 3–6	

== Other significant finals ==
=== Year-end championships (Elite) ===
==== Singles: 1 (runner-up) ====
Result	Year	Venue	Surface	Opponent	Score	Ref
Loss	2015	WTA Elite Trophy, China	Hard (i)	(United States) Venus Williams	5–7, 6–7^{(6–8)}	

=== WTA 1000 tournaments ===
==== Singles: 7 (2 titles, 5 runner-ups) ====
Result	Year	Tournament	Surface	Opponent	Score
Loss	2015	Dubai Championships	Hard	(Romania) Simona Halep	4–6, 6–7^{(4–7)}
Win	2016	Cincinnati Open	Hard	(Germany) Angelique Kerber	6–3, 6–1
Loss	2019	Miami Open	Hard	(Australia) Ashleigh Barty	6–7^{(1–7)}, 3–6
Win	2019	Italian Open	Clay	(United Kingdom) Johanna Konta	6–3, 6–4
Loss	2020	Italian Open	Clay	(Romania) Simona Halep	0–6, 1–2 (ret.)
Loss	2021	Italian Open	Clay	(Poland) Iga Świątek	0–6, 0–6
Loss	2021	Canadian Open	Hard	(Italy) Camila Giorgi	3–6, 5–7

==== Doubles: 1 (runner-up) ====
Result	Year	Tournament	Surface	Partner	Opponents	Score
Loss	2016	Indian Wells Open	Hard	(Germany) Julia Görges	(United States) Bethanie Mattek-Sands; (United States) CoCo Vandeweghe	6–4, 4–6, [6–10]

== WTA Tour finals ==
=== Singles: 34 (17 titles, 17 runner-ups) ===
Legend Grand Slam (0–2) WTA Elite Trophy (0–1) Premier M & Premier 5 / WTA 1000 (2–5) Premier / WTA 500 (9–4) International / WTA 250 (6–5)	Finals by surface Hard (11–10) Clay (3–3) Grass (3–4)

Result	W–L	Date	Tournament	Tier	Surface	Opponent	Score
Win	1–0	Mar 2013	Malaysian Open, Malaysia	International	Hard	(United States) Bethanie Mattek-Sands	1–6, 7–5, 6–3
Loss	1–1	Feb 2014	Thailand Open, Thailand	International	Hard	(Russia) Ekaterina Makarova	3–6, 6–7^{(7–9)}
Loss	1–2	May 2014	Nuremberg Cup, Germany	International	Clay	(Canada) Eugenie Bouchard	2–6, 6–4, 3–6
Loss	1–3	Sep 2014	Hong Kong Open, China SAR	International	Hard	(Germany) Sabine Lisicki	5–7, 3–6
Win	2–3	Sep 2014	Korea Open, South Korea	International	Hard	(United States) Varvara Lepchenko	6–3, 6–7^{(5–7)}, 6–2
Win	3–3	Oct 2014	Ladies Linz, Austria	International	Hard (i)	(Italy) Camila Giorgi	6–7^{(4–7)}, 6–3, 7–6^{(7–4)}
Loss	3–4	Jan 2015	Sydney International, Australia	Premier	Hard	(Czech Republic) Petra Kvitová	6–7^{(5–7)}, 6–7^{(6–8)}
Loss	3–5	Feb 2015	Dubai Championships, UAE	Premier 5	Hard	(Romania) Simona Halep	4–6, 6–7^{(4–7)}
Win	4–5	May 2015	Prague Open, Czech Republic	International	Clay	(Czech Republic) Lucie Hradecká	4–6, 7–5, 6–3
Loss	4–6	Jun 2015	Birmingham Classic, UK	Premier	Grass	(Germany) Angelique Kerber	7–6^{(7–5)}, 3–6, 6–7^{(4–7)}
Loss	4–7	Aug 2015	Stanford Classic, US	Premier	Hard	(Germany) Angelique Kerber	3–6, 7–5, 4–6
Loss	4–8	Nov 2015	WTA Elite Trophy, China	Elite	Hard (i)	(United States) Venus Williams	5–7, 6–7^{(6–8)}
Win	5–8	Jun 2016	Nottingham Open, UK	International	Grass	(United States) Alison Riske	7–6^{(10–8)}, 7–5
Loss	5–9	Jun 2016	Eastbourne International, UK	Premier	Grass	(Slovakia) Dominika Cibulková	5–7, 3–6
Win	6–9	Aug 2016	Cincinnati Open, US	Premier 5	Hard	(Germany) Angelique Kerber	6–3, 6–1
Loss	6–10	Sep 2016	US Open, US	Grand Slam	Hard	(Germany) Angelique Kerber	3–6, 6–4, 4–6
Win	7–10	Jan 2017	Brisbane International, Australia	Premier	Hard	(France) Alizé Cornet	6–0, 6–3
Win	8–10	Feb 2017	Qatar Ladies Open, Qatar	Premier	Hard	(Denmark) Caroline Wozniacki	6–3, 6–4
Win	9–10	Jul 2017	Eastbourne International, UK	Premier	Grass	(Denmark) Caroline Wozniacki	6–4, 6–4
Win	10–10	Apr 2018	Stuttgart Grand Prix, Germany	Premier	Clay (i)	(United States) CoCo Vandeweghe	7–6^{(7–2)}, 6–4
Win	11–10	Sep 2018	Pan Pacific Open, Japan	Premier	Hard (i)	(Japan) Naomi Osaka	6–4, 6–4
Loss	11–11	Oct 2018	Tianjin Open, China	International	Hard	(France) Caroline Garcia	6–7^{(7–9)}, 3–6
Win	12–11	Jan 2019	Brisbane International, Australia (2)	Premier	Hard	(Ukraine) Lesia Tsurenko	4–6, 7–5, 6–2
Loss	12–12	Mar 2019	Miami Open, US	Premier M	Hard	(Australia) Ashleigh Barty	6–7^{(1–7)}, 3–6
Win	13–12	May 2019	Italian Open, Italy	Premier 5	Clay	(United Kingdom) Johanna Konta	6–3, 6–4
Win	14–12	Jun 2019	Eastbourne International, UK (2)	Premier	Grass	(Germany) Angelique Kerber	6–1, 6–4
Win	15–12	Sep 2019	Zhengzhou Open, China	Premier	Hard	(Croatia) Petra Martić	6–3, 6–2
Win	16–12	Jan 2020	Brisbane International, Australia (3)	Premier	Hard	(United States) Madison Keys	6–4, 4–6, 7–5
Loss	16–13	Sep 2020	Italian Open, Italy	Premier 5	Clay	(Romania) Simona Halep	0–6, 1–2 ret.
Loss	16–14	May 2021	Italian Open, Italy	WTA 1000	Clay	(Poland) Iga Świątek	0–6, 0–6
Loss	16–15	Jul 2021	Wimbledon, UK	Grand Slam	Grass	(Australia) Ashleigh Barty	3–6, 7–6^{(7–4)}, 3–6
Loss	16–16	Aug 2021	Canadian Open, Canada	WTA 1000	Hard	(Italy) Camila Giorgi	3–6, 5–7
Win	17–16	Feb 2024	Transylvania Open, Romania	WTA 250	Hard (i)	(Romania) Ana Bogdan	6–4, 6–3
Loss	17–17	Jun 2024	Nottingham Open, UK	WTA 250	Grass	(United Kingdom) Katie Boulter	6–4, 3–6, 2–6

=== Doubles: 7 (5 titles, 2 runner-ups) ===
Legend WTA 1000 (0–1) WTA 500 (1–0) WTA 250 (4–1)	Finals by surface Hard (2–1) Clay (2–1) Grass (1–0)

Result	W–L	Date	Tournament	Tier	Surface	Partner	Opponents	Score
Loss	0–1	Jul 2013	Palermo Ladies Open, Italy	International	Clay	(Czech Republic) Kristýna Plíšková	(France) Kristina Mladenovic (Poland) Katarzyna Piter	1–6, 7–5, [8–10]
Win	1–1	Oct 2013	Ladies Linz, Austria	International	Hard (i)	(Czech Republic) Kristýna Plíšková	(Canada) Gabriela Dabrowski (Poland) Alicja Rosolska	7–6^{(8–6)}, 6–4
Win	2–1	May 2014	Nuremberg Cup, Germany	International	Clay	(Netherlands) Michaëlla Krajicek	(Romania) Raluca Olaru (Israel) Shahar Pe'er	6–0, 4–6, [10–6]
Win	3–1	Jul 2014	Gastein Ladies, Austria	International	Clay	(Czech Republic) Kristýna Plíšková	(Slovenia) Andreja Klepač (Spain) María Teresa Torró Flor	4–6, 6–3, [10–6]
Win	4–1	Sep 2014	Hong Kong Open, China SAR	International	Hard	(Czech Republic) Kristýna Plíšková	(Austria) Patricia Mayr-Achleitner (Australia) Arina Rodionova	6–2, 2–6, [12–10]
Loss	4–2	Mar 2016	Indian Wells Open, US	Premier M	Hard	(Germany) Julia Görges	(United States) Bethanie Mattek-Sands; (United States) CoCo Vandeweghe	6–4, 4–6, [6–10]
Win	5–2	Jun 2016	Birmingham Classic, UK	Premier	Grass	(Czech Republic) Barbora Strýcová	(United States) Vania King (Russia) Alla Kudryavtseva	6–3, 7–6^{(7–1)}

== Team competition finals ==
=== Billie Jean King Cup: 3 (3 titles) ===
Result	W–L	Date	Tournament	Surface	Against	Partners	Opponents in the final	Score
Win	1–0	Nov 2015	Fed Cup, Czech Republic	Hard (i)	Russia	Petra Kvitová; Barbora Strýcová; Lucie Šafářová (Note: Participate in the previous rounds of the edition but not in the final.); Tereza Smitková; Denisa Šátralová	Maria Sharapova; Anastasia Pavlyuchenkova; Elena Vesnina	3–2
Win	2–0	Nov 2016	Fed Cup, France (2)	Hard (i)	France	Petra Kvitová; Barbora Strýcová; Lucie Hradecká	Caroline Garcia; Kristina Mladenovic; Alizé Cornet	3–2
Win	3–0	Nov 2018	Fed Cup, Czech Republic (3)	Hard (i)	United States	Barbora Strýcová; Kateřina Siniaková; Petra Kvitová; Lucie Šafářová; Barbora Krejčíková (Note: Krejčíková was planned for playing doubles match alongside Kateřina Siniaková. Since it was obvious that Czech Republic won after leading 3–0, match was cancelled.)	Sofia Kenin; Alison Riske; Danielle Collins; Nicole Melichar	3–0

== ITF finals ==
=== Singles: 16 (10 titles, 6 runner-ups) ===
Legend 75K tournaments (0–1) 50K tournaments (2–1) 25K tournaments (7–4) 10K tournaments (1–0)	Finals by surface Hard (4–2) Clay (2–2) Grass (0–2) Carpet (4–0)

Result	W–L	Date	Tournament	Tier	Surface	Opponent	Score
Win	1–0	Apr 2008	ITF Bol, Croatia	10K	Clay	(France) Florence Haring	6–4, 7–5
Win	2–0	May 2009	Grado Tennis Cup, Italy	25K	Clay	(Germany) Julia Schruff	7–6^{(7–2)}, 7–5
Win	3–0	Sep 2009	ITF Noto, Japan	25K	Carpet	(Japan) Shiho Hisamatsu	3–6, 7–6^{(7–2)}, 7–6^{(11–9)}
Win	4–0	Apr 2010	Kangaroo Cup, Japan	50K	Hard	(China) Sun Shengnan	6–3, 3–6, 6–3
Loss	4–1	May 2010	Kurume Cup, Japan	50K	Grass	(Czech Republic) Kristýna Plíšková	7–5, 2–6, 0–6
Win	5–1	Oct 2010	GB Pro-Series Glasgow, UK	25K	Hard (i)	(Greece) Eirini Georgatou	3–6, 6–0, 6–3
Loss	5–2	May 2011	Přerov Cup, Czech Republic	25K	Clay	(Hungary) Réka-Luca Jani	0–6, 3–6
Loss	5–3	Jul 2011	ITF Darmstadt, Germany	25K	Clay	(Luxembourg) Mandy Minella	6–7^{(5–7)}, 2–6
Win	6–3	Oct 2011	ITF Makinohara, Japan	25K	Carpet	(Japan) Erika Sema	6–7^{(5–7)}, 6–2, 6–0
Win	7–3	Oct 2011	ITF Hamanako, Japan	25K	Carpet	(Japan) Junri Namigata	6–2, 7–6^{(7–4)}
Loss	7–4	Nov 2011	ITF Bratislava, Slovakia	25K	Hard (i)	(Ukraine) Lesia Tsurenko	5–7, 3–6
Loss	7–5	Nov 2011	ITF Vendryně, Czech Republic	25K	Hard (i)	(Switzerland) Amra Sadiković	7–5, 1–6, 6–7^{(5–7)}
Win	8–5	Jan 2012	Open de l'Isère, France	25K	Hard (i)	(Czech Republic) Kristýna Plíšková	7–6^{(13–11)}, 7–6^{(8–6)}
Win	9–5	Nov 2012	ITF Zawada, Poland	25K	Carpet (i)	(Croatia) Ana Vrljić	6–3, 6–2
Loss	9–6	Jun 2013	Nottingham Trophy, UK	75K	Grass	(Croatia) Petra Martić	3–6, 3–6
Win	10–6	Sep 2013	ITF Sanya, China	50K	Hard	(China) Zheng Saisai	6–3, 6–4

=== Doubles: 12 (6 titles, 6 runner-ups) ===
Legend 100K tournaments (1–1) 75K tournaments (0–2) 50K tournaments (0–1) 25K tournaments (5–2)	Finals by surface Hard (4–4) Clay (1–2) Carpet (1–0)

Result	W–L	Date	Tournament	Tier	Surface	Partner	Opponents	Score
Loss	0–1	May 2010	Kurume Cup, Japan	50K	Clay	(Czech Republic) Kristýna Plíšková	(China) Sun Shengnan (China) Xu Yifan	0–6, 3–6
Win	1–1	Feb 2011	ITF Rancho Mirage, U.S.	25K	Hard	(Czech Republic) Kristýna Plíšková	(Russia) Nadejda Guskova (Poland) Sandra Zaniewska	6–7^{(6–8)}, 6–1, 6–4
Win	2–1	May 2011	Přerov Cup, Czech Republic	25K	Clay	(Czech Republic) Kateřina Kramperová	(Ukraine) Lyudmyla Kichenok (Ukraine) Nadiia Kichenok	6–3, 6–4
Los	2–2	Jul 2011	ITF Darmstadt, Germany	25K	Clay	(Czech Republic) Hana Birnerová	(Russia) Natela Dzalamidze (Germany) Anna Zaja	5–7, 6–2, [6–10]
Win	3–2	Aug 2011	Vancouver Open, Canada	100K	Hard	(Czech Republic) Kristýna Plíšková	(United States) Jamie Hampton (Thailand) Noppawan Lertcheewakarn	5–7, 6–2, 6–4
Loss	3–3	Nov 2011	Taipei Open, Taiwan	100K	Hard (i)	(Czech Republic) Kristýna Plíšková	(Chinese Taipei) Chan Yung-jan (China) Zheng Jie	6–7^{(5–7)}, 7–5, 3–6
Loss	3–4	Nov 2011	ITF Bratislava, Slovakia	25K	Hard (i)	(Czech Republic) Kristýna Plíšková	(United Kingdom) Naomi Broady (France) Kristina Mladenovic	7–5, 4–6, [2–10]
Win	4–4	Jan 2012	Andrézieux-Bouthéon Open, France	25K	Hard (i)	(Czech Republic) Kristýna Plíšková	(France) Julie Coin (Czech Republic) Eva Hrdinová	6–4, 4–6, [10–5]
Win	5–4	Jan 2012	Open de l'Isère, France	25K	Hard (i)	(Czech Republic) Kristýna Plíšková	(Ukraine) Valentyna Ivakhnenko (Ukraine) Maryna Zanevska	6–1, 6–3
Loss	5–5	Sep 2012	GB Pro-Series Shrewsbury, UK	75K	Hard (i)	(Czech Republic) Kristýna Plíšková	(Serbia) Vesna Dolonc (Switzerland) Stefanie Vögele	1–6, 7–6^{(7–3)}, [13–15]
Win	6–5	Nov 2012	ITF Zawada, Poland	25K	Carpet (i)	(Czech Republic) Kristýna Plíšková	(Germany) Kristina Barrois (Austria) Sandra Klemenschits	6–3, 6–1
Loss	6–6	Nov 2012	Dubai Tennis Challenge, UAE	75K	Hard	(Czech Republic) Eva Hrdinová	(Italy) Maria Elena Camerin (Russia) Vera Dushevina	5–7, 3–6

== ITF Junior Circuit ==
=== Junior Grand Slam finals ===
==== Singles: 1 (title) ====
Result	Year	Tournament	Surface	Opponent	Score
Win	2010	Australian Open	Hard	(United Kingdom) Laura Robson	6–1, 7–6^{(7–5)}

=== ITF Junior Circuit finals ===
==== Singles: 3 (2 titles, 1 runner-up) ====
Legend
Grade A (1–0)
Grade 1 / B1 (1–0)
Grade 2 (0–0)
Grade 3 (0–0)
Grade 4 (0–0)
Grade 5 (0–1)

Result	W–L	Date	Tournament	Tier	Surface	Opponent	Score
Loss	0–1	Mar 2006	ITF Riga, Latvia	Grade 5	Carpet	(Ukraine) Iuliia Kiriienko	0–6, 1–6
Win	1–1	Jan 2010	Australian Open, Australia	Grand A	Hard	(United Kingdom) Laura Robson	6–1, 7–6^{(7–5)}
Win	2–1	Sep 2010	Canadian Open, Canada	Grade 1	Hard	(Romania) Cristina Dinu	6–2 6–3

==== Doubles: 6 (3 titles, 3 runner-ups) ====
Legend
Grade A (0–0)
Grade 1 / B1 (1–1)
Grade 2 (0–1)
Grade 3 (0–0)
Grade 4 (0–1)
Grade 5 (2–0)

Result	W–L	Date	Tournament	Tier	Surface	Partner	Opponents	Score
Win	1–0	Mar 2006	ITF Riga, Latvia	Grade 5	Carpet	(Czech Republic) Kristýna Plíšková	(Latvia) Alise Razina (Latvia) Trīna Šlapeka	6–4, 6–2
Win	2–0	Apr 2006	ITF Marsa, Malta	Grade 5	Hard	(Czech Republic) Kristýna Plíšková	(France) Amandine Hesse (France) Lise Marbach	6–4, 6–1
Loss	2–1	Jul 2006	ITF Prague, Czech Republic	Grade 4	Clay	(Czech Republic) Kristýna Plíšková	(Czech Republic) Petra Kvitová (Czech Republic) Alena Nogolova	5–7, 1–6
Loss	2–2	Apr 2007	ITF Piešťany, Slovakia	Grade 2	Clay	(Czech Republic) Kristýna Plíšková	(Czech Republic) Jana Orlova (Czech Republic) Pavla Smidova	1–6, 7–6^{(7–5)}, 3–6
Loss	2–3	Jun 2010	ITF Roehampton, United Kingdom	Grade 1	Grass	(Czech Republic) Kristýna Plíšková	(Belgium) An-Sophie Mestach (Netherlands) Demi Schuurs	4–6, 6–3, [2–10]
Win	3–3	Sep 2010	Canadian Open, Canada	Grade 1	Hard	(Czech Republic) Kristýna Plíšková	(Canada) Eugenie Bouchard (Canada) Gabriela Dabrowski	6–4, 6–4

== Fed Cup/Billie Jean King Cup participation ==
=== Singles: 18 (11–7) ===
Legend
World Group/Finals RR/QF/SF/F (11–7)

Edition	Round	Date	Location	Against	Surface	Opponent	W/L	Score
2015	WG QF	Feb 2015	Québec City (CAN)	Canada	Hard (i)	Françoise Abanda	W	6–2, 6–4
2015	WG QF	Feb 2015	Québec City (CAN)	Canada	Hard (i)	Gabriela Dabrowski	W	6–4, 6–2
2015	WG F	Nov 2015	Prague (CZE)	Russia	Hard (i)	Maria Sharapova	L	3–6, 4–6
2015	WG F	Nov 2015	Prague (CZE)	Russia	Hard (i)	Anastasia Pavlyuchenkova	W	6–3, 6–4
2016	WG QF	Feb 2016	Cluj-Napoca (ROU)	Romania	Hard (i)	Simona Halep	W	6–7^{(4–7)}, 6–4, 6–2
2016	WG QF	Feb 2016	Cluj-Napoca (ROU)	Romania	Hard (i)	Monica Niculescu	W	6–4, 4–6, 6–3
2016	WG SF	Apr 2016	Lucerne (SUI)	Switzerland	Hard (i)	Viktorija Golubic	L	6–3, 4–6, 4–6
2016	WG SF	Apr 2016	Lucerne (SUI)	Switzerland	Hard (i)	Timea Bacsinszky	W	6–4, 6–2
2016	WG F	Nov 2016	Strasbourg (FRA)	France	Hard (i)	Kristina Mladenovic	W	6–3, 4–6, 16–14
2016	WG F	Nov 2016	Strasbourg (FRA)	France	Hard (i)	Caroline Garcia	L	3–6, 6–3, 3–6
2017	WG QF	Feb 2017	Ostrava (CZE)	Spain	Hard (i)	Lara Arruabarrena	W	6–4, 7–5
2017	WG QF	Feb 2017	Ostrava (CZE)	Spain	Hard (i)	Garbiñe Muguruza	W	6–2, 6–2
2018	WG SF	Apr 2018	Stuttgart (GER)	Germany	Clay (i)	Angelique Kerber	W	7–5, 6–3
2018	WG SF	Apr 2018	Stuttgart (GER)	Germany	Clay (i)	Julia Görges	L	4–6, 2–6
2019	WG QF	Feb 2019	Ostrava (CZE)	Romania	Hard (i)	Simona Halep	L	
2019	WG QF	Feb 2019	Ostrava (CZE)	Romania	Hard (i)	Mihaela Buzărnescu	W	
2022	F RR	Nov 2022	Glasgow (SCO)	Poland	Hard (i)	Magda Linette	L	
2022	F SF	Nov 2022	Glasgow (SCO)	Switzerland	Hard (i)	Belinda Bencic	L	

=== Doubles: 5 (4–1) ===
Legend
World Group/Finals RR/QF/SF/F (4–1)

Edition	Round	Date	Location	Against	Surface	Partner	Opponents	W/L	Score
2015	WG F	Nov 2015	Prague (CZE)	Russia	Hard (i)	Barbora Strýcová	Anastasia Pavlyuchenkova; Elena Vesnina	W	
2016	WG QF	Feb 2016	Cluj-Napoca (ROU)	Romania	Hard (i)	Barbora Strýcová	Andreea Mitu; Raluca Olaru	W	
2016	WG SF	Apr 2016	Lucerne (SUI)	Switzerland	Hard (i)	Lucie Hradecká	Viktorija Golubic; Martina Hingis	W	
2016	WG F	Nov 2016	Strasbourg (FRA)	France	Hard (i)	Barbora Strýcová	Caroline Garcia; Kristina Mladenovic	W	
2022	F SF	Nov 2022	Glasgow (SCO)	United States	Hard (i)	Karolína Muchová	Madison Keys; Taylor Townsend	L	

== WTA ranking ==
Legend
World No. 1
World No. 2
World No. 3
World No. 4–10
Others

Year	2006	2007	2008	2009	2010	2011	2012	2013	2014	2015	2016	2017	2018	2019	2020	2021	2022	2023	Career
Singles
Highest ranking	1092	733	402	220	168	143	107	63	23	7	5	1	4	2	2	3	4	17	1
Lowest ranking	1190	1184	781	580	271	266	148	130	75	23	20	6	9	8	6	13	32	31	1192
Year-end ranking	1168	860	427	228	203	159	120	67	24	11	6	4	8	2	6	4	32		2
Doubles
Highest ranking	–	855	779	568	355	127	91	75	41	38	11	11	200	94	77	66	123	319	11
Lowest ranking	–																		
Year-end ranking	–	917	818	–	364	130	102	77	46	46	11	414	208	96	86	124	329		11

== WTA Tour career earnings ==
Correct after the 2023 Canadian Open.

Year	Grand Slam titles	WTA titles	Total titles	Earnings ($)	Money list rank
2013	0	2	2	296,840	87
2014	0	5	5	768,635	34
2015	0	1	1	1,658,155	18
2016	0	3	3	3,976,093	5
2017	0	3	3	3,902,665	7
2018	0	2	2	3,539,050	8
2019	0	4	4	5,138,077	6
2020	0	1	1	888,916	15
2021	0	0	0	2,868,865	4
2022	0	0	0	1,024,297	35
2023	0	0	0	864,616	32
Career	0	21	21	25,159,211	11

== Career Grand Slam statistics ==
=== Grand Slam tournament seedings ===
The tournaments won by Plíšková are in boldface, and advanced into finals by Plíšková are in italics.

Year	Australian Open	French Open	Wimbledon	US Open
2012	did not play	qualifier	qualifier	did not play
2013	not seeded	not seeded	not seeded	not seeded
2014	not seeded	not seeded	not seeded	not seeded
2015	22nd	12th	11th	8th
2016	9th	17th	15th	10th (1)
2017	5th	2nd	3rd	1st
2018	6th	6th	7th	8th
2019	7th	2nd	3rd	3rd
2020	2nd	2nd	cancelled	1st
2021	6th	9th	8th (2)	4th
2022	did not play	8th	6th	22nd
2023	30th	16th	18th	25th
2024	not seeded	not seeded	not seeded	not seeded
2025	did not play	did not play	did not play	did not play
2026	not seeded	did not play	not seeded	

=== Best Grand Slam results details ===
Grand Slam winners are in boldface, and runner–ups are in italics.

Australian Open
2019 Australian Open (7th seed)
Round	Opponent	Rank	Score
1R	(Czech Republic) Karolína Muchová (Q)	139	6–3, 6–2
2R	(United States) Madison Brengle	88	4–6, 6–1, 6–0
3R	(Italy) Camila Giorgi (27)	28	6–4, 3–6, 6–2
4R	(Spain) Garbiñe Muguruza (18)	18	6–3, 6–1
QF	(United States) Serena Williams (16)	16	6–4, 4–6, 7–5
SF	(Japan) **Naomi Osaka** (4)	4	2–6, 6–4, 4–6

Wimbledon Championships
2021 Wimbledon (8th seed)
Round	Opponent	Rank	Score
1R	(Slovenia) Tamara Zidanšek	47	7–5, 6–4
2R	(Croatia) Donna Vekić	49	6–2, 6–2
3R	(Czech Republic) Tereza Martincová	87	6–3, 6–3
4R	(Russia) Liudmila Samsonova (WC)	65	6–2, 6–3
QF	(Switzerland) Viktorija Golubic	66	6–2, 6–2
SF	(Belarus) Aryna Sabalenka (2)	4	5–7, 6–4, 6–4
F	(Australia) **Ashleigh Barty** (1)	**1**	3–6, 7–6^{(7–4)}, 3–6

French Open
2017 French Open (2nd seed)
Round	Opponent	Rank	Score
1R	(China) Zheng Saisai	67	7–5, 6–2
2R	(Russia) Ekaterina Alexandrova	86	6–2, 4–6, 6–3
3R	(Germany) Carina Witthöft	73	7–5, 6–1
4R	(Paraguay) Verónica Cepede Royg	95	2–6, 6–3, 6–4
QF	(France) Caroline Garcia (28)	27	7–6^{(7–3)}, 6–4
SF	(Romania) Simona Halep (3)	4	4–6, 6–3, 3–6

US Open
2016 US Open (10th seed)
Round	Opponent	Rank	Score
1R	(United States) Sofia Kenin (WC)	243	6–4, 6–3
2R	(Paraguay) Montserrat González (Q)	192	6–1, 7–5
3R	(Russia) Anastasia Pavlyuchenkova (17)	18	6–2, 6–4
4R	(United States) Venus Williams (6)	6	4–6, 6–4, 7–6^{(7–3)}
QF	(Croatia) Ana Konjuh	92	6–2, 6–2
SF	(United States) Serena Williams (1)	**1**	6–2, 7–6^{(7–5)}
F	(Germany) **Angelique Kerber** (2)	2	3–6, 6–4, 4–6

== Wins against top 10 players ==
- Plíšková has a 42–54 (44%) record against players who were, at the time the match was played, ranked in the top 10.

#	Player	Rk	Event	Surface	Rd	Score	Rk		Ref
1.	(Germany) Angelique Kerber	9	Nuremberg Cup, Germany	Clay	QF	7–6^{(7–5)}, 6–4	64	2014	
2.	(Serbia) Ana Ivanovic	9	US Open, United States	Hard	2R	7–5, 6–4	42	2014	
3.	(Germany) Angelique Kerber	9	Sydney International, Australia	Hard	SF	6–3, 6–2	22	2015	
4.	(Serbia) Ana Ivanovic	6	Dubai Championships, UAE	Hard	3R	6–2, 4–6, 6–4	18	2015	
5.	(Spain) Carla Suárez Navarro	9	Birmingham Classic, United Kingdom	Grass	QF	6–2, 6–2	12	2015	
6.	(Romania) Simona Halep	3	Fed Cup, Romania	Hard (i)	QF	6–7^{(4–7)}, 6–4, 6–2	13	2016	
7.	(Russia) Svetlana Kuznetsova	10	Cincinnati Open, United States	Hard	QF	6–3, 4–6, 6–2	17	2016	
8.	(Spain) Garbiñe Muguruza	3	Cincinnati Open, United States	Hard	SF	6–1, 6–3	17	2016	
9.	(Germany) Angelique Kerber	2	Cincinnati Open, United States	Hard	F	6–3, 6–1	17	2016	
10.	(United States) Venus Williams	6	US Open, United States	Hard	4R	4–6, 6–4, 7–6^{(7–3)}	11	2016	
11.	(United States) Serena Williams	1	US Open, United States	Hard	SF	6–2, 7–6^{(7–5)}	11	2016	
12.	(Spain) Garbiñe Muguruza	6	WTA Finals, Singapore	Hard (i)	RR	6–2, 6–7^{(4–7)}, 7–5	5	2016	
13.	(Spain) Garbiñe Muguruza	7	Fed Cup, Czech Republic	Hard (i)	QF	6–2, 6–2	3	2017	
14.	(Slovakia) Dominika Cibulková	5	Qatar Open, Qatar	Hard	SF	6–4, 4–6, 6–3	3	2017	
15.	(Spain) Garbiñe Muguruza	7	Indian Wells Open, United States	Hard	QF	7–6^{(7–2)}, 7–6^{(7–5)}	3	2017	
16.	(Russia) Svetlana Kuznetsova	8	Eastbourne International, United Kingdom	Grass	QF	6–7^{(7–9)}, 6–2, 6–4	3	2017	
17.	(Denmark) Caroline Wozniacki	6	Eastbourne International, United Kingdom	Grass	F	6–4, 6–4	3	2017	
18.	(Denmark) Caroline Wozniacki	5	Cincinnati Open, United States	Hard	QF	6–2, 6–4	1	2017	
19.	(United States) Venus Williams	5	WTA Finals, Singapore	Hard (i)	RR	6–2, 6–2	3	2017	
20.	(Spain) Garbiñe Muguruza	2	WTA Finals, Singapore	Hard (i)	RR	6–2, 6–2	3	2017	
21.	(Latvia) Jeļena Ostapenko	5	Stuttgart Open, Germany	Clay (i)	QF	5–7, 7–5, 6–4	6	2018	
22.	(United States) Sloane Stephens	9	Madrid Open, Spain	Clay	3R	6–2, 6–3	6	2018	
23.	(Romania) Simona Halep	1	Madrid Open, Spain	Clay	QF	6–4, 6–3	6	2018	
24.	(Japan) Naomi Osaka	7	Pan Pacific Open, Japan	Hard (i)	F	6–4, 6–4	8	2018	
25.	(Denmark) Caroline Wozniacki	3	WTA Finals, Singapore	Hard (i)	RR	6–2, 6–4	8	2018	
26.	(Czech Republic) Petra Kvitová	5	WTA Finals, Singapore	Hard (i)	RR	6–3, 6–4	8	2018	
27.	(Romania) Simona Halep	3	Miami Open, United States	Hard	SF	7–5, 6–1	7	2019	
28.	(Netherlands) Kiki Bertens	4	Eastbourne International, United Kingdom	Grass	SF	6–1, 6–2	3	2019	
29.	(Germany) Angelique Kerber	5	Eastbourne International, United Kingdom	Grass	F	6–1, 6–4	3	2019	
30.	(Canada) Bianca Andreescu	4	WTA Finals, China	Hard (i)	RR	6–3, ret.	2	2019	
31.	(Romania) Simona Halep	5	WTA Finals, China	Hard (i)	RR	6–0, 2–6, 6–4	2	2019	
32	(Japan) Naomi Osaka	4	Brisbane International, Australia	Hard	SF	6–7^{(10–12)}, 7–6^{(7–3)}, 6–2	2	2020	
33	(Belarus) Aryna Sabalenka	4	Wimbledon, United Kingdom	Grass	SF	5–7, 6–4, 6–4	13	2021	
34	(Belarus) Aryna Sabalenka	3	Canadian Open, Canada	Hard	SF	6–3, 6–4	6	2021	
35	(Spain) Garbiñe Muguruza	5	WTA Finals, Mexico	Hard	RR	4–6, 6–2, 7–6^{(8–6)}	4	2021	
36	(Czech Republic) Barbora Krejčíková	3	WTA Finals, Mexico	Hard	RR	0–6, 6–4, 6–4	4	2021	
37	(Greece) Maria Sakkari	4	Canadian Open, Canada	Hard	3R	6–1, 6–7^{(9–11)}, 6–3	14	2022	
38	(Greece) Maria Sakkari	7	Dubai Championships, UAE	Hard	2R	6–1, 6–2	18	2023	
39	(Greece) Maria Sakkari	9	Stuttgart Open, Germany	Clay (i)	1R	6–2, 6–3	17	2023	
40	(Tunisia) Ons Jabeur	10	Nottingham Open, United Kingdom	Grass	QF	7–6^{(10–8)}, 6–7^{(3–7)} 7–5	50	2024	
41	(United States) Amanda Anisimova	4	Qatar Open, Qatar	Hard	2R	5–7, 7–6^{(7–3)}, 4–1, ret.	418	2026	
42	(Canada) Victoria Mboko	9	Queen's Club Championships, UK	Grass	2R	6–2, 3–4, ret.	106	2026	

- Key: (Rk) first use, opponent rank; (Rd) round; (Rk) 2nd use, player rank; (Ref) reference; (F) final; (SF) semifinal; (QF) quarterfinal; (#R) rounds 4, 3, 2, 1; (RR) round-robin stage; (Q#) qualifying rounds or stages (3), 2, 1.

== Longest winning streaks ==
=== 11–match singles winning streak (2016) ===
#	Tournament	Category	Start date	Surface	Rd	Opponent	Rank	Score
–	Canadian Open, Canada	Premier 5	25 July 2016	Hard	3R	(Romania) Simona Halep	No. 5	3–6, 3–6
–	Cincinnati Open, United States	Premier 5	15 Aug 2016	Hard	1R	bye		
1	Cincinnati Open, United States	Premier 5	15 Aug 2016	Hard	2R	(Latvia) Jeļena Ostapenko	No. 39	6–4, 6–1
2	Cincinnati Open, United States	Premier 5	15 Aug 2016	Hard	3R	(Japan) Misaki Doi (LL)	No. 38	7–5, 6–3
3	Cincinnati Open, United States	Premier 5	15 Aug 2016	Hard	QF	(Russia) Svetlana Kuznetsova (7)	No. 10	6–3, 4–6, 6–2
4	Cincinnati Open, United States	Premier 5	15 Aug 2016	Hard	SF	(Spain) Garbiñe Muguruza (4)	No. 3	6–1, 6–3
5	Cincinnati Open, United States	Premier 5	15 Aug 2016	Hard	F	(Germany) Angelique Kerber (2)	No. 2	6–3, 6–1
6	US Open, United States	Grand Slam	29 Aug 2016	Hard	1R	(United States) Sofia Kenin (WC)	No. 243	6–4, 6–3
7	US Open, United States	Grand Slam	29 Aug 2016	Hard	2R	(Paraguay) Montserrat González (Q)	No. 192	6–1, 7–5
8	US Open, United States	Grand Slam	29 Aug 2016	Hard	3R	(Russia) Anastasia Pavlyuchenkova (17)	No. 18	6–2, 6–4
9	US Open, United States	Grand Slam	29 Aug 2016	Hard	4R	(United States) Venus Williams (6)	No. 6	4–6, 6–4, 7–6^{(7–3)}
10	US Open, United States	Grand Slam	29 Aug 2016	Hard	QF	(Croatia) Ana Konjuh	No. 92	6–2, 6–2
11	US Open, United States	Grand Slam	29 Aug 2016	Hard	SF	(United States) Serena Williams (1)	No. 1	6–2, 7–6^{(7–5)}
–	US Open, United States	Grand Slam	29 Aug 2016	Hard	F	(Germany) Angelique Kerber (2)	No. 2	3–6, 6–4, 4–6
