= 2013 ITF Women's Circuit – Sanya – Singles =

Sanya – Singles
- 2013 ITF Women's Circuit – Sanya

Final
- Champion: (Czech Republic) Karolína Plíšková
- Runner-up: (China) Zheng Saisai
- Score: 6–3, 6–4

Events
Singles	Doubles
← 2012 ·	ITF Women's Circuit – Sanya	· 2014 →

Wang Qiang was the defending champion, having won the event in 2012, but lost in the first round to Wang Yafan.

Karolína Plíšková won the title, defeating Zheng Saisai in the final, 6–3, 6–4

== Seeds ==
1. (Czech Republic) Karolína Plíšková (champion)
2. (China) Zhang Shuai (semifinals)
3. (China) Duan Yingying (semifinals; retired)
4. (China) Zheng Saisai (final)
5. (Serbia) Jovana Jakšić (second round)
6. (Kazakhstan) Zarina Diyas (quarterfinals)
7. (China) Wang Qiang (first round)
8. (Thailand) Varatchaya Wongteanchai (quarterfinals)

== Main draw ==
=== Key ===
- Q = Qualifier
- WC = Wild card
- LL = Lucky loser
- Alt = Alternate
- SE = Special exempt
- PR = Protected ranking
- ITF = ITF entry
- JE = Junior exempt
- w/o = Walkover
- r = Retired
- d = Defaulted
- SR = Special ranking

=== Finals ===
Semifinals
1	(Czech Republic) Karolína Plíšková	1	5
3	(China) Duan Yingying	6	2^{r}
4	(China) Zheng Saisai	6	7^{7}
2	(China) Zhang Shuai	3	6^{4}

Final
1	(Czech Republic) Karolína Plíšková	6	6
4	(China) Zheng Saisai	3	4

=== Top half ===
First round
1	(Czech Republic) Ka Plíšková	6	7^{8}
WC	(China) R Tian	1	6^{6}
Q	(China) C Liang	4	2
(Bolivia) MF Álvarez Terán	6	6
Q	(Chinese Taipei) W-h Hsu	6	3	1
(Japan) M Eguchi	4	6	6
(China) Y Xu	4	2
5	(Serbia) J Jakšić	6	6
3	(China) Y Duan	7	6
(China) X Han	5	0
(Chinese Taipei) Y-h Lee	6	2	3
(Hong Kong) L Zhang	1	6	6
(Chinese Taipei) Y-j Chan	6	3	4
Q	(China) Y Zhao	3	6	6
Q	(China) H Tang	5	6	6^{4}
8	(Thailand) V Wongteanchai	7	2	7^{7}

Second round
1	(Czech Republic) Ka Plíšková	6	6
(Bolivia) MF Álvarez Terán	3	4
(Japan) M Eguchi	1	7	6
5	(Serbia) J Jakšić	6	5	4
3	(China) Y Duan	6	6
(Hong Kong) L Zhang	4	0
Q	(China) Y Zhao	6	4	3
8	(Thailand) V Wongteanchai	4	6	6

Quarterfinals
1	(Czech Republic) Ka Plíšková	6	6
(Japan) M Eguchi	1	1
3	(China) Y Duan	6^{4}	6	6
8	(Thailand) V Wongteanchai	7^{7}	2	2

Semifinals
1	(Czech Republic) Ka Plíšková	1	5
3	(China) Y Duan	6	2^{r}

=== Bottom half ===
First round
6	(Kazakhstan) Z Diyas	6	0
(China) X Wen	1	0^{r}
(India) A Raina	7	3	1
(China) Y Hu	5	6	6
WC	(China) S Xu	6	6
WC	(China) Z Sun	2	1
(Japan) N Hibino	3	6^{0}
4	(China) S Zheng	6	7^{7}
7	(China) Q Wang	1	6^{1}
WC	(China) Y Wang	6	7^{7}
(China) C Liu	6	6
LL	(China) D Zhao	4	3
(China) Z Yang	6	0
(Thailand) N Lertcheewakarn	1	0^{r}
(Australia) A Bai	2	1
2	(China) S Zhang	6	6

Second round
6	(Kazakhstan) Z Diyas	6	6
(China) Y Hu	3	4
WC	(China) S Xu	6	1	5
4	(China) S Zheng	3	6	7
WC	(China) Y Wang	6	6
(China) C Liu	1	3
(China) Z Yang	0	1
2	(China) S Zhang	6	6

Quarterfinals
6	(Kazakhstan) Z Diyas	3	1
4	(China) S Zheng	6	6
WC	(China) Y Wang	2	4
2	(China) S Zhang	6	6

Semifinals
4	(China) S Zheng	6	7^{7}
2	(China) S Zhang	3	6^{4}
