= 2013 ITF Women's Circuit – Sanya – Doubles =

Sanya – Doubles
- 2013 ITF Women's Circuit – Sanya

Final
- Champions: (China) Sun Ziyue (China) Xu Shilin
- Runners-up: (China) Yang Zhaoxuan (China) Zhao Yijing
- Score: 6–7^{(5–7)}, 6–3, [10–3]

Events
Singles	Doubles
← 2012 ·	ITF Women's Circuit – Sanya	· 2014 →

Erika Sema and Zheng Saisai were the defending champions, having won the event in 2012, but both players decided not to participate in 2013.

Sun Ziyue and Xu Shilin won the title, defeating Yang Zhaoxuan and Zhao Yijing in the final, 6–7^{(5–7)}, 6–3, [10–3].

== Seeds ==
1. (Thailand) ~~Noppawan Lertcheewakarn~~ / (Thailand) ~~Varatchaya Wongteanchai~~ (withdrew)
2. (Bolivia) María Fernanda Álvarez Terán / (United States) Keri Wong (quarterfinals)
3. (China) Liu Chang / (China) Xu Yifan (quarterfinals; withdrew)
4. (China) Han Xinyun / (China) Wen Xin (semifinals; withdrew)

== Draw ==
=== Key ===
- Q = Qualifier
- WC = Wild card
- LL = Lucky loser
- Alt = Alternate
- SE = Special exempt
- PR = Protected ranking
- ITF = ITF entry
- JE = Junior exempt
- w/o = Walkover
- r = Retired
- d = Defaulted
- SR = Special ranking

First round
Alt	(China) X Jiang (China) M Qin	4	0
(China) X Dong (China) Y Yang	6	6
WC	(China) B Wang (China) Y Wang	6	6
(India) A Raina (China) Zi Yang	3	2
3	(China) C Liu (China) Y Xu	3	7^{7}	[10]
(Kazakhstan) Z Diyas (Hong Kong) L Zhang	6	6^{4}	[8]
WC	(China) X Cai (Japan) S Ohta	1	3
WC	(China) Z Sun (China) S Xu	6	6
(Chinese Taipei) S-y Kao (Chinese Taipei) Y-h Lee	6	6
(China) H Tang (China) R Tian	1	2
(Chinese Taipei) W-h Hsu (China) C Liang	1	6	[6]
4	(China) X Han (China) X Wen	6	2	[10]
(China) Zh Yang (China) Y Zhao	6	6
(Japan) M Eguchi (Japan) N Hibino	1	3
(Australia) A Bai (Chinese Taipei) S-y Hsieh	1	3
2	(Bolivia) MF Álvarez Terán (United States) K Wong	6	6

Quarterfinals
(China) X Dong (China) Y Yang	2	7^{7}	[8]
WC	(China) B Wang (China) Y Wang	6	6^{5}	[10]
3	(China) C Liu (China) Y Xu
WC	(China) Z Sun (China) S Xu	w/o
(Chinese Taipei) S-y Kao (Chinese Taipei) Y-h Lee	4	6	[1]
4	(China) X Han (China) X Wen	6	3	[10]
(China) Zh Yang (China) Y Zhao	6	7
2	(Bolivia) MF Álvarez Terán (United States) K Wong	3	5

Semifinals
WC	(China) B Wang (China) Y Wang	6^{2}	6	[6]
WC	(China) Z Sun (China) S Xu	7^{7}	3	[10]
4	(China) X Han (China) X Wen
(China) Zh Yang (China) Y Zhao	w/o

Final
WC	(China) Z Sun (China) S Xu	6^{5}	6	[10]
(China) Zh Yang (China) Y Zhao	7^{7}	3	[3]
