= ITF Women's Circuit – Sanya =

ITF Women's Tour
- Event name: ITF Women's Circuit – Sanya
- Location: Sanya, China
- Venue: Sanya Yuantong Tennis Center
- Category: ITF Women's Circuit
- Surface: Hard
- Draw: 32S/32Q/16D
- Prize money: $50,000

The ITF Women's Circuit – Sanya was a tournament for professional tennis players played on outdoor hardcourts in Sanya, China. It was classified as a $50,000 ITF Women's Circuit event which took place from 2011 to 2013.

== Past finals ==
=== Singles ===
Year	Champion	Runner-up	Score
2013	(Czech Republic) Karolína Plíšková	(China) Zheng Saisai	6–3, 6–4
2012	(China) Wang Qiang	(China) Han Xinyun	6–2, 6–4
2011	(Hong Kong) Zhang Ling	(France) Iryna Brémond	3–6, 7–6^{(7–4)}, 6–2

=== Doubles ===
Year	Champions	Runners-up	Score
2013	(China) Sun Ziyue (China) Xu Shilin	(China) Yang Zhaoxuan (China) Zhao Yijing	6–7^{(5–7)}, 6–3, [10–3]
2012	(Japan) Erika Sema (China) Zheng Saisai	(China) Liang Chen (China) Zhou Yimiao	6–2, 6–2
2011	(France) Iryna Brémond (Croatia) Ani Mijačika	(Japan) Rika Fujiwara (Chinese Taipei) Hsu Wen-hsin	3–6, 7–5, [12–10]
