= 2016 US Open – Women's singles =

Women's singles
- 2016 US Open

Final
- Champion: (Germany) Angelique Kerber
- Runner-up: (Czech Republic) Karolína Plíšková
- Score: 6–3, 4–6, 6–4

Details
- Draw: 128 (16Q / 8WC)
- Seeds: 32

Events
Singles	men	women		boys	girls
Doubles	men	women	mixed	boys	girls
- US Open

Angelique Kerber defeated Karolína Plíšková in the final, 6–3, 4–6, 6–4 to win the women's singles tennis title at the 2016 US Open. It was her second major title. Kerber was the first player since Martina Hingis in 1997 to win both hardcourt majors in the same calendar year, having also won the Australian Open. She attained the world No. 1 singles ranking for the first time after Serena Williams failed to reach the final. In addition to Kerber and Williams, Garbiñe Muguruza and Agnieszka Radwańska were in contention for the top position. The final was a rematch of the Cincinnati final three weeks prior, won by Plíšková.

Flavia Pennetta was the reigning champion, but retired from the sport at the end of 2015.

Plíšková was the first Czech woman to reach the final since Helena Suková in 1993, and only the fourth player to beat both Williams sisters in the same major (defeating Venus Williams in the fourth round and Serena Williams in the semifinals).

This was Venus Williams' 72nd main draw major appearance, surpassing the all-time record previously held by Amy Frazier.

This marked the last professional appearance of former world No. 1 and 2008 French Open champion Ana Ivanovic, who lost to Denisa Allertová in the first round. She announced her retirement at the end of the season due to ongoing injuries. It also marked the first main-draw US Open appearance of future two-time champion and world No. 1 Naomi Osaka; she lost in the third round to Madison Keys.

== Seeds ==
1. (United States) Serena Williams (semifinals)
2. (Germany) Angelique Kerber (champion)
3. (Spain) Garbiñe Muguruza (second round)
4. (Poland) Agnieszka Radwańska (fourth round)
5. (Romania) Simona Halep (quarterfinals)
6. (United States) Venus Williams (fourth round)
7. (Italy) Roberta Vinci (quarterfinals)
8. (United States) Madison Keys (fourth round)
9. (Russia) Svetlana Kuznetsova (second round)
10. (Czech Republic) Karolína Plíšková (final)
11. (Spain) Carla Suárez Navarro (fourth round)
12. (Slovakia) Dominika Cibulková (third round)
13. (United Kingdom) Johanna Konta (fourth round)
14. (Czech Republic) Petra Kvitová (fourth round)
15. (Switzerland) Timea Bacsinszky (second round)
16. (Australia) Samantha Stosur (second round)

17. (Russia) Anastasia Pavlyuchenkova (third round)
18. (Czech Republic) Barbora Strýcová (first round)
19. (Russia) Elena Vesnina (third round)
20. (Netherlands) Kiki Bertens (first round)
21. (Romania) Irina-Camelia Begu (first round)
22. (Ukraine) Elina Svitolina (third round)
23. (Russia) Daria Kasatkina (first round)
24. (Switzerland) Belinda Bencic (third round)
25. (France) Caroline Garcia (third round)
26. (Germany) Laura Siegemund (third round)
27. (Italy) Sara Errani (first round)
28. (United States) CoCo Vandeweghe (first round)
29. (Serbia) Ana Ivanovic (first round)
30. (Japan) Misaki Doi (first round)
31. (Hungary) Tímea Babos (third round)
32. (Puerto Rico) Monica Puig (first round)

Click on the seed number of a player to go to their draw section.

== Draw ==
Key

- Q = Qualifier
- WC = Wild card
- LL = Lucky loser
- Alt = Alternate
- ITF = ITF entry
- PR = Protected ranking
- SR = Special ranking
- SE = Special exempt
- JE = Junior exempt
- JR = Junior Accelerator Programme entrant
- CO = College Accelerator Programme entrant
- NG = Next Gen Accelerator Program entrant
- w/o = Walkover
- r = Retired
- d = Defaulted

=== Finals ===
Quarterfinals
1	(United States) Serena Williams	6	4	6
5	(Romania) Simona Halep	2	6	3
(Croatia) Ana Konjuh	2	2
10	(Czech Republic) Karolína Plíšková	6	6
(Denmark) Caroline Wozniacki	6	6
(Latvia) Anastasija Sevastova	0	2
7	(Italy) Roberta Vinci	5	0
2	(Germany) Angelique Kerber	7	6

Semifinals
1	(United States) Serena Williams	2	6^{5}
10	(Czech Republic) Karolína Plíšková	6	7^{7}
(Denmark) Caroline Wozniacki	4	3
2	(Germany) Angelique Kerber	6	6

Final
10	(Czech Republic) Karolína Plíšková	3	6	4
2	(Germany) Angelique Kerber	6	4	6

=== Top half ===
==== Section 1 ====
First round
1	(United States) S Williams	6	6
(Russia) E Makarova	3	3
Q	(Germany) A Lottner	6^{2}	3
WC	(United States) V King	7^{7}	6
(Italy) K Knapp	4	2
(Sweden) J Larsson	6	6
(Czech Republic) D Allertová	7^{7}	6
29	(Serbia) A Ivanovic	6^{4}	1
23	(Russia) D Kasatkina	4	6	2
(China) Q Wang	6	2	6
(Spain) L Arruabarrena	2	3
(Kazakhstan) Y Shvedova	6	6
(China) S Zhang	6	6
WC	(Australia) E Perez	1	1
(Italy) C Giorgi	5	7^{7}	1
16	(Australia) S Stosur	7	6^{4}	6

Second round
1	(United States) S Williams	6	6
WC	(United States) V King	3	3
(Sweden) J Larsson	6	6
(Czech Republic) D Allertová	3	1
(China) Q Wang	0	1
(Kazakhstan) Y Shvedova	6	6
(China) S Zhang	6	6
16	(Australia) S Stosur	3	3

Third round
1	(United States) S Williams	6	6
(Sweden) J Larsson	2	1
(Kazakhstan) Y Shvedova	6	7
(China) S Zhang	2	5

Fourth round
1	(United States) S Williams	6	6
(Kazakhstan) Y Shvedova	2	3

==== Section 2 ====
First round
11	(Spain) C Suárez Navarro	6	6
(Brazil) T Pereira	0	0
(Colombia) M Duque Mariño	4	1
(Serbia) J Janković	6	6
(Germany) A Beck	7^{8}	6
Q	(Argentina) N Podoroska	6^{6}	3
(Estonia) A Kontaveit	6^{4}	6	3
19	(Russia) E Vesnina	7^{7}	4	6
31	(Hungary) T Babos	5	6	7
Q	(Austria) B Haas	7	3	5
(United Kingdom) H Watson	2	5
Q	(Netherlands) R Hogenkamp	6	7
(Czech Republic) L Šafářová	6	6
(Australia) D Gavrilova	4	4
(Belgium) K Flipkens	0	2
5	(Romania) S Halep	6	6

Second round
11	(Spain) C Suárez Navarro	6	6
(Serbia) J Janković	1	4
(Germany) A Beck	2	1
19	(Russia) E Vesnina	6	6
31	(Hungary) T Babos	6	6
Q	(Netherlands) R Hogenkamp	2	4
(Czech Republic) L Šafářová	3	4
5	(Romania) S Halep	6	6

Third round
11	(Spain) C Suárez Navarro	6	6
19	(Russia) E Vesnina	4	3
31	(Hungary) T Babos	1	6	4
5	(Romania) S Halep	6	2	6

Fourth round
11	(Spain) C Suárez Navarro	2	5
5	(Romania) S Halep	6	7

==== Section 3 ====
First round
4	(Poland) A Radwańska	6	6
Q	(United States) J Pegula	1	1
(United Kingdom) N Broady	6^{4}	6	6
Q	(United Kingdom) L Robson	7^{7}	3	4
(Czech Republic) K Siniaková	6	3	6
(Canada) E Bouchard	3	6	2
(France) P Parmentier	6	3	4
25	(France) C Garcia	4	6	6
20	(Netherlands) K Bertens	3	6	4
(Croatia) A Konjuh	6	2	6
(Japan) K Nara	6	7
(Switzerland) S Vögele	0	5
PR	(China) S Peng	6	6^{9}	3
(United States) V Lepchenko	4	7^{11}	6
PR	(Russia) V Diatchenko	1	1
15	(Switzerland) T Bacsinszky	6	6

Second round
4	(Poland) A Radwańska	7^{11}	6
(United Kingdom) N Broady	6^{9}	3
(Czech Republic) K Siniaková	6	4	4
25	(France) C Garcia	4	6	6
(Croatia) A Konjuh	6	6
(Japan) K Nara	3	3
(United States) V Lepchenko	6	4	6
15	(Switzerland) T Bacsinszky	4	6	4

Third round
4	(Poland) A Radwańska	6	6
25	(France) C Garcia	2	3
(Croatia) A Konjuh	6	3	6
(United States) V Lepchenko	3	6	2

Fourth round
4	(Poland) A Radwańska	4	4
(Croatia) A Konjuh	6	6

==== Section 4 ====
First round
10	(Czech Republic) Ka Plíšková	6	6
WC	(United States) S Kenin	4	3
Q	(Paraguay) M González	7	6
(Montenegro) D Kovinić	5	2
(Japan) N Hibino	4	5
(France) K Mladenovic	6	7
(United States) L Chirico	1	4
17	(Russia) A Pavlyuchenkova	6	6
26	(Germany) L Siegemund	3	6	6
(Romania) PM Țig	6	3	2
(United States) N Gibbs	6	6
Q	(Serbia) A Krunić	1	0
(Germany) J Görges	6	6
(Belgium) Y Wickmayer	3	2
(Ukraine) K Kozlova	2	7	4
6	(United States) V Williams	6	5	6

Second round
10	(Czech Republic) Ka Plíšková	6	7
Q	(Paraguay) M González	1	5
(France) K Mladenovic	2	6	6^{5}
17	(Russia) A Pavlyuchenkova	6	4	7^{7}
26	(Germany) L Siegemund	6	7
(United States) N Gibbs	3	5
(Germany) J Görges	2	3
6	(United States) V Williams	6	6

Third round
10	(Czech Republic) Ka Plíšková	6	6
17	(Russia) A Pavlyuchenkova	2	4
26	(Germany) L Siegemund	1	2
6	(United States) V Williams	6	6

Fourth round
10	(Czech Republic) Ka Plíšková	4	6	7^{7}
6	(United States) V Williams	6	4	6^{3}

=== Bottom half ===
==== Section 5 ====
First round
8	(United States) M Keys	4	7^{7}	6
(United States) A Riske	6	6^{5}	2
(United States) M Brengle	2	2^{r}
WC	(United States) K Day	6	4
(Greece) M Sakkari	4	6	3
Q	(China) Y Duan	6	4	6
(Japan) N Osaka	6^{4}	6	6
28	(United States) C Vandeweghe	7^{7}	3	4
18	(Czech Republic) B Strýcová	3	7^{7}	1
(Romania) M Niculescu	6	6^{3}	6
(Romania) S Cîrstea	6	5	2
Q	(Romania) A Bogdan	0	7	6
Q	(United States) T Townsend	6	3	4
(Denmark) C Wozniacki	4	6	6
(Italy) F Schiavone	1	2
9	(Russia) S Kuznetsova	6	6

Second round
8	(United States) M Keys	6	6
WC	(United States) K Day	1	1
Q	(China) Y Duan	4	6^{3}
(Japan) N Osaka	6	7^{7}
(Romania) M Niculescu	6	6
Q	(Romania) A Bogdan	0	1
(Denmark) C Wozniacki	6	6
9	(Russia) S Kuznetsova	4	4

Third round
8	(United States) M Keys	7	4	7^{7}
(Japan) N Osaka	5	6	6^{3}
(Romania) M Niculescu	3	1
(Denmark) C Wozniacki	6	6

Fourth round
8	(United States) M Keys	3	4
(Denmark) C Wozniacki	6	6

==== Section 6 ====
First round
13	(United Kingdom) J Konta	6	6
WC	(United States) B Mattek-Sands	3	3
(Bulgaria) T Pironkova	6	6
WC	(France) V Razzano	1	2
(Germany) A Petkovic	7^{7}	6
Q	(Slovakia) K Kučová	6^{3}	3
(United States) S Crawford	7^{8}	3	4
24	(Switzerland) B Bencic	6^{6}	6	6
32	(Puerto Rico) M Puig	4	2
(China) S Zheng	6	6
(Chinese Taipei) S-w Hsieh	0	5
(Ukraine) K Bondarenko	6	7
(Latvia) A Sevastova	6	6
(Slovakia) AK Schmiedlová	3	3
Q	(Belgium) E Mertens	6	0	3
3	(Spain) G Muguruza	2	6	6

Second round
13	(United Kingdom) J Konta	6	5	6
(Bulgaria) T Pironkova	2	7	2
(Germany) A Petkovic	3	2
24	(Switzerland) B Bencic	6	6
(China) S Zheng	7	6^{5}	5
(Ukraine) K Bondarenko	5	7^{7}	7
(Latvia) A Sevastova	7	6
3	(Spain) G Muguruza	5	4

Third round
13	(United Kingdom) J Konta	6	6
24	(Switzerland) B Bencic	2	1
(Ukraine) K Bondarenko	4	1
(Latvia) A Sevastova	6	6

Fourth round
13	(United Kingdom) J Konta	4	5
(Latvia) A Sevastova	6	7

==== Section 7 ====
First round
7	(Italy) R Vinci	6	6
(Germany) A-L Friedsam	2	4
(United States) C McHale	6	6
(Germany) M Barthel	2	2
(Kazakhstan) Y Putintseva	6	6
(Germany) S Lisicki	1	2
(Germany) C Witthöft	6	6
30	(Japan) M Doi	4	1
21	(Romania) I-C Begu	0	4
(Ukraine) L Tsurenko	6	6
Q	(China) Y Wang	6	7^{7}
LL	(Belgium) A Van Uytvanck	3	6^{4}
WC	(United States) D Collins	1	2
(Russia) E Rodina	6	6
(Poland) M Linette	2	3
12	(Slovakia) D Cibulková	6	6

Second round
7	(Italy) R Vinci	6	6
(United States) C McHale	1	3
(Kazakhstan) Y Putintseva	1	7^{7}	1
(Germany) C Witthöft	6	6^{1}	6
(Ukraine) L Tsurenko	7	6
Q	(China) Y Wang	5	3
(Russia) E Rodina	7^{7}	2	2
12	(Slovakia) D Cibulková	6^{5}	6	6

Third round
7	(Italy) R Vinci	6	5	6
(Germany) C Witthöft	0	7	3
(Ukraine) L Tsurenko	3	6	6
12	(Slovakia) D Cibulková	6	3	4

Fourth round
7	(Italy) R Vinci	7^{7}	6
(Ukraine) L Tsurenko	6^{5}	2

==== Section 8 ====
First round
14	(Czech Republic) P Kvitová	7	6
(Latvia) J Ostapenko	5	3
(United States) I Falconi	2	1
(Turkey) Ç Büyükakçay	6	6
(Belarus) A Sasnovich	2	6	5
WC	(United States) L Davis	6	4	7
Q	(Luxembourg) M Minella	7^{7}	0	2
22	(Ukraine) E Svitolina	6^{5}	6	6
27	(Italy) S Errani	4	6^{3}
(United States) S Rogers	6	7^{7}
Q	(United States) C Bellis	6	6
(Switzerland) V Golubic	2	3
(France) A Cornet	4	1
(Croatia) M Lučić-Baroni	6	6
(Slovenia) P Hercog	0	0^{r}
2	(Germany) A Kerber	6	1

Second round
14	(Czech Republic) P Kvitová	7^{7}	6
(Turkey) Ç Büyükakçay	6^{2}	3
WC	(United States) L Davis	1	6	3
22	(Ukraine) E Svitolina	6	4	6
(United States) S Rogers	6	2	2
Q	(United States) C Bellis	2	6	6
(Croatia) M Lučić-Baroni	2	6^{7}
2	(Germany) A Kerber	6	7^{9}

Third round
14	(Czech Republic) P Kvitová	6	6
22	(Ukraine) E Svitolina	3	4
Q	(United States) C Bellis	1	1
2	(Germany) A Kerber	6	6

Fourth round
14	(Czech Republic) P Kvitová	3	5
2	(Germany) A Kerber	6	7

== Championship match statistics ==
Category	(Germany) Kerber	(Czech Republic) Plíšková
1st serve %	62/98 (63%)	53/89 (60%)
1st serve points won	43 of 62 = 69%	40 of 53 = 75%
2nd serve points won	19 of 36 = 53%	14 of 36 = 39%
Total service points won	62 of 98 = 63.27%	54 of 89 = 60.67%
Aces	1	5
Double faults	2	4
Winners	21	40
Unforced errors	17	47
Net points won	2 of 5 = 40%	26 of 33 = 79%
Break points converted	4 of 5 = 80%	2 of 7 = 29%
Return points won	35 of 89 = 39%	36 of 98 = 37%
Total points won	97	90

== Seeded players ==
The following are the seeded players. Seedings are based on WTA rankings on August 22, 2016. Rank and points before are as of August 29, 2016.

Seed	Rank	Player	Points before	Points defending	Points won	Points after	Status
1	1	(United States) Serena Williams	7,050	780	780	7,050	Semifinals lost to (Czech Republic) Karolína Plíšková [10]
2	2	(Germany) Angelique Kerber	6,860	130	2,000	8,730	Champion, defeated (Czech Republic) Karolína Plíšková [10]
3	3	(Spain) Garbiñe Muguruza	5,830	70	70	5,830	Second round lost to (Latvia) Anastasija Sevastova
4	4	(Poland) Agnieszka Radwańska	5,705	130	240	5,815	Fourth round lost to (Croatia) Ana Konjuh
5	5	(Romania) Simona Halep	5,151	780	430	4,801	Quarterfinals lost to (United States) Serena Williams [1]
6	6	(United States) Venus Williams	4,005	430	240	3,815	Fourth round lost to (Czech Republic) Karolína Plíšková [10]
7	8	(Italy) Roberta Vinci	3,465	1,300	430	2,595	Quarterfinals lost to (Germany) Angelique Kerber [2]
8	9	(United States) Madison Keys	3,286	240	240	3,286	Fourth round lost to (Denmark) Caroline Wozniacki
9	10	(Russia) Svetlana Kuznetsova	3,190	10	70	3,250	Second round lost to (Denmark) Caroline Wozniacki
10	11	(Czech Republic) Karolína Plíšková	3,135	10	1,300	4,425	Runner-up, lost to (Germany) Angelique Kerber [2]
11	12	(Spain) Carla Suárez Navarro	3,100	10	240	3,330	Fourth round lost to (Romania) Simona Halep [5]
12	13	(Slovakia) Dominika Cibulková	3,100	130	130	3,100	Third round lost to (Ukraine) Lesia Tsurenko
13	14	(United Kingdom) Johanna Konta	2,905	280	240	2,865	Fourth round lost to (Latvia) Anastasija Sevastova
14	16	(Czech Republic) Petra Kvitová	2,580	430	240	2,390	Fourth round lost to (Germany) Angelique Kerber [2]
15	15	(Switzerland) Timea Bacsinszky	2,713	10	70	2,773	Second round lost to (United States) Varvara Lepchenko
16	17	(Australia) Samantha Stosur	2,370	240	70	2,200	Second round lost to (China) Zhang Shuai
17	18	(Russia) Anastasia Pavlyuchenkova	2,195	70	130	2,255	Third round lost to (Czech Republic) Karolína Plíšková [10]
18	21	(Czech Republic) Barbora Strýcová	2,050	130	10	1,930	First round lost to (Romania) Monica Niculescu
19	20	(Russia) Elena Vesnina	2,054	70	130	2,114	Third round lost to (Spain) Carla Suárez Navarro [11]
20	22	(Netherlands) Kiki Bertens	1,945	110	10	1,845	First round lost to (Croatia) Ana Konjuh
21	23	(Romania) Irina-Camelia Begu	1,835	10	10	1,835	First round lost to (Ukraine) Lesia Tsurenko
22	19	(Ukraine) Elina Svitolina	2,101	130	130	2,101	Third round lost to (Czech Republic) Petra Kvitová [14]
23	24	(Russia) Daria Kasatkina	1,773	130	10	1,653	First round lost to (China) Wang Qiang
24	26	(Switzerland) Belinda Bencic	1,602	130	130	1,602	Third round lost to (United Kingdom) Johanna Konta [13]
25	33	(France) Caroline Garcia	1,555	10	130	1,675	Third round lost to (Poland) Agnieszka Radwańska [4]
26	27	(Germany) Laura Siegemund	1,600	40+140	130+13	1,563	Third round lost to (United States) Venus Williams [6]
27	28	(Italy) Sara Errani	1,590	130	10	1,470	First round lost to (United States) Shelby Rogers
28	30	(United States) Coco Vandeweghe	1,561	70	10	1,501	First round lost to (Japan) Naomi Osaka
29	31	(Serbia) Ana Ivanovic	1,560	10	10	1,560	First round lost to (Czech Republic) Denisa Allertová
30	32	(Japan) Misaki Doi	1,555	70	10	1,495	First round lost to (Germany) Carina Witthöft
31	34	(Hungary) Tímea Babos	1,510	10	130	1,630	Third round lost to (Romania) Simona Halep [5]
32	35	(Puerto Rico) Monica Puig	1,500	10	10	1,500	First round lost to (China) Zheng Saisai

=== Withdrawn players ===
The following players would have been seeded, but they withdrew or not entered from the event.

Rank	Player	Points before	Points defending	Points after	Withdrawal reason
7	(Belarus) Victoria Azarenka	3,551	430	3,121	Pregnancy
25	(United States) Sloane Stephens	1,612	10	1,602	Right foot injury

== Other entry information ==
=== Wild cards ===
- (United States) Danielle Collins (Note: Winner of the women's singles tournament in the 2016 NCAA Division I Tennis Championships)
- (United States) Kayla Day (Note: Winner of the USTA Girls' under-18 national tournament)
- (United States) Lauren Davis
- (United States) Sofia Kenin (Note: Winner of the Women's USTA Wild Card Challenge held in Stockton, California, Sacramento, California and Lexington, Kentucky)
- (United States) Vania King
- (United States) Bethanie Mattek-Sands
- (Australia) Ellen Perez
- (France) Virginie Razzano

=== Protected ranking ===
- (China) Peng Shuai (27)
- (Russia) Vitalia Diatchenko (91)

=== Qualifiers ===
- (United States) Catherine Bellis
- (Romania) Ana Bogdan
- (China) Duan Yingying
- (Paraguay) Montserrat González
- (Austria) Barbara Haas
- (Netherlands) Richèl Hogenkamp
- (Serbia) Aleksandra Krunić
- (Slovakia) Kristína Kučová
- (Germany) Antonia Lottner
- (Belgium) Elise Mertens
- (Luxembourg) Mandy Minella
- (United States) Jessica Pegula
- (Argentina) Nadia Podoroska
- (United Kingdom) Laura Robson
- (United States) Taylor Townsend
- (China) Wang Yafan

=== Lucky loser ===
- (Belgium) Alison Van Uytvanck

=== Withdrawals ===
Before the tournament

- † (Belarus) Victoria Azarenka (6) → replaced by (Romania) Patricia Maria Țig (102)
- † (Russia) Maria Sharapova (97) → replaced by (Belarus) Aliaksandra Sasnovich (103)
- ‡ (Russia) Margarita Gasparyan (60) → replaced by (Russia) Evgeniya Rodina (104)
- ‡ (Kazakhstan) Galina Voskoboeva (64 PR) → replaced by (Switzerland) Stefanie Vögele (105) (Note: Last direct acceptance)
- § (United States) Sloane Stephens (23) → replaced by (Belgium) Alison Van Uytvanck (LL)

† – not included on entry list
‡ – withdrew from entry list before qualifying began
§ – withdrew from entry list after qualifying began

Retirements

- (United States) Madison Brengle
- (Slovenia) Polona Hercog

== Notes ==
Preceded by 2016 Wimbledon Championships – Women's singles	Grand Slam women's singles	Succeeded by 2017 Australian Open – Women's singles
