= Sun Ziyue =

Chinese tennis player

Sun Ziyue 孙子玥
- Country (sports): China
- Born: 6 July 1996 (age 28); Nanjing, China
- Prize money: US$ 43,566

Singles
- Career record: 99–76
- Career titles: 0
- Highest ranking: No. 337 (10 February 2020)

Grand Slam singles results
- Australian Open Junior: SF (2014)
- French Open Junior: 1R (2014)
- US Open Junior: 2R (2013)

Doubles
- Career record: 33–55
- Career titles: 2 ITF
- Highest ranking: No. 383 (18 August 2014)

Grand Slam doubles results
- Australian Open Junior: SF (2013)
- French Open Junior: 2R (2014)
- US Open Junior: 1R (2013)

Sun Ziyue (Chinese: 孙子玥; pinyin: Sūn Ziyuè; Mandarin pronunciation: [swə́n tsɹ̩̀ ɥê]; born 6 July 1996 in Nanjing) is a Chinese former professional tennis player.

In her career, Sun won two doubles titles on the ITF Circuit. On 10 February 2020, she reached her best singles ranking of world No. 337. On 18 August 2014, she peaked at No. 383 in the WTA doubles rankings.

At the 2013 Asian Youth Games, Sun won both the girls' singles and mixed-doubles titles.

Partnering Xu Shilin, Sun won her first $50k title at the ITF event in Sanya, defeating Yang Zhaoxuan and Zhao Yijing in the 2013 final.

== ITF Circuit finals ==
=== Singles: 1 (runner–up) ===
Legend $25,000 tournaments $15,000 tournaments	Finals by surface Hard (0–1) Clay (0–0)

Result	W–L	Date	Tournament	Tier	Surface	Opponents	Score
Loss	0–1	Jun 2019	ITF Hengyang, China	25,000	Hard	(China) Wang Xinyu	4–6, 3–6

=== Doubles: 4 (2 titles, 2 runner–ups) ===
Legend $50,000 tournaments $15,000 tournaments	Finals by surface Hard (2–2) Clay (0–0)

Result	W–L	Date	Tournament	Surface	Partner	Opponents	Score
Win	1–0	Sep 2013	ITF Sanya, China	Hard	(China) Xu Shilin	(China) Yang Zhaoxuan (China) Zhao Yijing	6–7^{(5)}, 6–3, [10–3]
Loss	1–1	Mar 2014	Blossom Cup, China	Hard	(China) Xu Shilin	(Chinese Taipei) Chan Chin-wei (China) Xu Yifan	6–7^{(4)}, 1–6
Win	2–1	Mar 2017	ITF Nanjing, China	Hard	(China) Sun Xuliu	(Russia) Angelina Gabueva (Russia) Olga Puchkova	6–3, 6–1
Loss	2–2	Mar 2018	ITF Xiamen, China	Hard	(China) Sun Xuliu	(Germany) Sarah-Rebecca Sekulic (China) Xu Shilin	1–6, 5–7

== See also ==
- Tennis at the 2013 Asian Youth Games
