= Xu Shilin (tennis) =

Chinese tennis player

Xu Shilin 徐诗霖
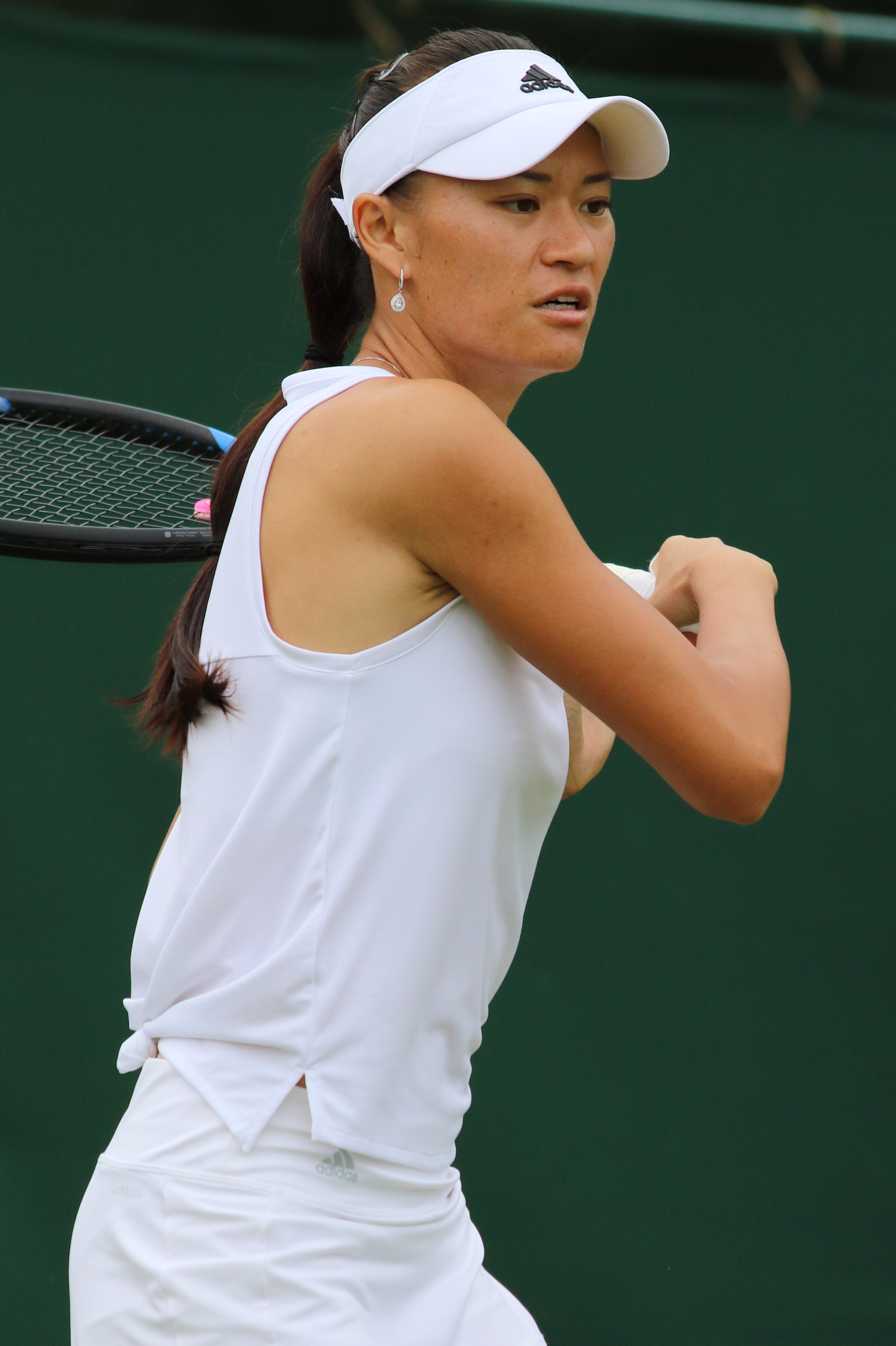
- Xu at the 2019 Wimbledon qualifying
- Country (sports): China
- Born: 10 January 1998 (age 28) Zhongshan, China
- Plays: Right (two-handed both sides)
- Prize money: US$ 265,556

Singles
- Career record: 155–141
- Career titles: 5 ITF
- Highest ranking: No. 190 (6 May 2019)
- Current ranking: No. 697 (26 Jan 2026)

Grand Slam singles results
- Australian Open: Q2 (2019)
- French Open: Q2 (2019)
- Wimbledon: Q1 (2019)
- US Open: Q3 (2019)

Doubles
- Career record: 80–63
- Career titles: 6 ITF
- Highest ranking: No. 127 (22 August 2016)

Grand Slam doubles results
- Australian Open Junior: SF (2015)
- French Open Junior: QF (2015)
- Wimbledon Junior: QF (2015)
- US Open Junior: 2R (2013)
Medal record
Representing China
Youth Olympic Games
| Gold medal – first place | 2014 Nanjing | Girls' singles |

Xu Shilin (Chinese: 徐诗霖; pinyin: Xú Shīlín; Mandarin pronunciation: [ɕy̌ ʂɻ̩́ lǐn]; born 10 January 1998) is a Chinese tennis player.

Xu was born in Zhongshan, and has won five singles and six doubles titles on the ITF Women's Circuit. On 6 May 2019, she reached her best singles ranking of world No. 190. On 22 August 2016, she peaked at No. 127 in the WTA doubles rankings.

Having not competed on the pro circuit since July 2021, she returned to competition in May 2025 after nearly 45 months away from the tour.

== Career ==
=== 2013 ===
Partnering Sun Ziyue, Xu won her first $50k tournament at Sanya, defeating Yang Zhaoxuan and Zhao Yijing in the 2013 final.

=== 2014 ===
At the Shenzhen Open, Xu made her WTA Tour debut. Having been given a wild card into qualifying for the singles main draw, she was drawn against Britain's Johanna Konta. Despite a difference of over 500 places in the world rankings, Xu won in straight sets, but lost to Lyudmyla Kichenok in the final round. Partnering Sun Ziyue again in doubles at the tournament, Xu was given a wild card into the main draw, but couldn't make it past her fellow Chinese pairing of Wang Yafan and Zheng Jie, who later made it to the semifinals.

At the 2014 Summer Youth Olympics in Nanjing, Xu won the gold medal in girls' singles, having defeated Iryna Shymanovich of Belarus in straight sets in the final.

== WTA Tour finals ==
=== Doubles: 1 (runner–up) ===
| Legend Grand Slam (0–0) WTA 1000 (0–0) WTA 500 (0–0) WTA 250 (0–1) | Finals by surface Hard (0–1) Clay (0–0) Grass (0–0) Carpet (0–0) |

| Result | Date | Tournament | Tier | Surface | Partner | Opponents | Score |
|---|---|---|---|---|---|---|---|
| Loss | Sep 2015 | Guangzhou International, China | International | Hard | (China) You Xiaodi | (Switzerland) Martina Hingis (India) Sania Mirza | 3–6, 1–6 |

== ITF Circuit finals ==
=== Singles: 7 (5 titles, 2 runner–ups) ===
| Legend $60,000 tournaments $25,000 tournaments $10/15,000 tournaments | Finals by surface Hard (3–1) Clay (2–1) |

| Result | W–L | Date | Tournament | Tier | Surface | Opponent | Score |
|---|---|---|---|---|---|---|---|
| Win | 1–0 | Dec 2013 | ITF Hong Kong | W10 | Hard | (China) Zhao Di | 6–0, 6–3 |
| Win | 2–0 | Dec 2013 | ITF Hong Kong | W10 | Hard | (China) Tang Haochen | 6–1, 6–4 |
| Loss | 2–1 | Jul 2015 | ITF Hong Kong | W15 | Hard | (South Korea) Lee So-ra | 4–6, 6–4, 2–6 |
| Win | 3–1 | Jun 2016 | ITF Padua, Italy | W25 | Clay | (Turkey) İpek Soylu | 5–7, 6–4, 6–3 |
| Loss | 3–2 | May 2018 | ITF Women's Circuit – Baotou, China | W60 | Clay (i) | (Serbia) Nina Stojanovic | 0–6, 4–6 |
| Win | 4–2 | Oct 2018 | Brisbane QTC Tennis International, Australia | W25 | Hard | (Australia) Ellen Perez | 6–4, 6–3 |
| Win | 5–2 | Nov 2018 | Copa LP Chile, Chile | W60 | Clay | (Argentina) Paula Ormaechea | 7–5, 6–3 |

=== Doubles: 12 (7 titles, 5 runner–ups) ===
| Legend $50,000 tournaments $25,000 tournaments $15,000 tournaments | Finals by surface Hard (4–3) Clay (3–1) Grass (0–1) |

| Result | W–L | Date | Tournament | Tier | Surface | Partner | Opponents | Score |
|---|---|---|---|---|---|---|---|---|
| Win | 1–0 | Sep 2013 | ITF Women's Circuit – Sanya, China | W50 | Hard | (China) Sun Ziyue | (China) Yang Zhaoxuan (China) Zhao Yijing | 6–7^{(5–7)}, 6–3, [10–3] |
| Loss | 1–1 | Mar 2014 | Industrial Bank Cup, China | W50 | Hard | (China) Sun Ziyue | (Chinese Taipei) Chan Chin-wei (China) Xu Yifan | 6–7^{(4–7)}, 1–6 |
| Win | 2–1 | Sep 2015 | Zhuhai Open, China | W50 | Hard | (China) You Xiaodi | (Russia) Irina Khromacheva (United Kingdom) Emily Webley-Smith | 3–6, 6–2, [10–4] |
| Loss | 2–2 | May 2016 | Kurume Cup, Japan | W50 | Grass | (Hungary) Dalma Gálfi | (Chinese Taipei) Hsu Ching-wen (Russia) Ksenia Lykina | 6–7^{(5–7)}, 2–6 |
| Win | 3–2 | Jun 2016 | Internazionale di Roma, Italy | W50 | Clay | (Turkey) İpek Soylu | (Hungary) Réka Luca Jani (Georgia (country)) Sofia Shapatava | 7–5, 6–1 |
| Win | 4–2 | Mar 2018 | ITF Xiamen, China | W15 | Hard | (Germany) Sarah-Rebecca Sekulic | (China) Sun Xuliu (China) Sun Ziyue | 6–1, 7–5 |
| Loss | 4–3 | Apr 2018 | ITF Pula, Italy | W25 | Clay | (Belgium) Marie Benoît | (Australia) Naiktha Bains (United States) Chiara Scholl | 4–6, 5–7 |
| Loss | 4–4 | Jun 2018 | ITF Sumter, United States | W25 | Hard | (United States) Julia Elbaba | (Australia) Astra Sharma (Brazil) Luisa Stefani | 6–2, 3–6, [5–10] |
| Win | 5–4 | Sep 2018 | ITF Cairns, Australia | W25 | Hard | (Australia) Naikhta Bains | (New Zealand) Erin Routliffe (Australia) Astra Sharma | 6–1, 7–6^{(9–7)} |
| Loss | 5–5 | Oct 2018 | Brisbane QTC Tennis International, Australia | W25 | Hard | (India) Rutuja Bhosale | (Australia) Maddison Inglis (Australia) Kaylah McPhee | 5–7, 4–6 |
| Win | 6–5 | Jul 2019 | Open Porte du Hainaut, France | W25 | Clay | (Russia) Daria Mishina | (Chile) Bárbara Gatica (Brazil) Rebeca Pereira | 6–0, 7–5 |
| Win | 7–5 | Mar 2025 | ITF Antalya, Turkiye | W15 | Clay | (Germany) Annemarie Lazar | (Turkey) Selina Atay (Turkey) Melis Sezer | 7–6^{(7–2)}, 7–5 |
