= Zheng Saisai =

Chinese tennis player (born 1994)

Zheng Saisai 郑赛赛
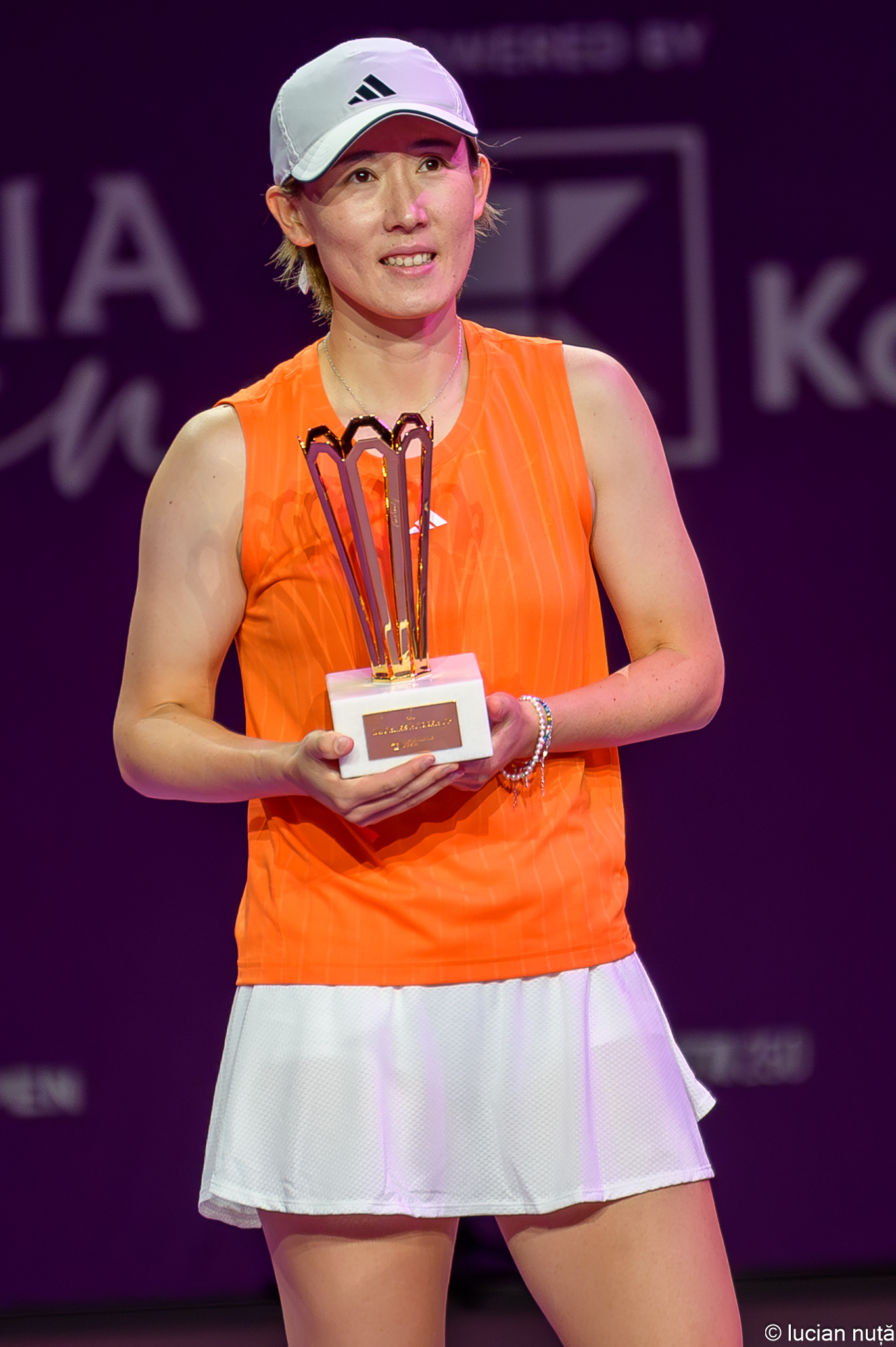
- Zheng Saisai at the 2026 Transylvania Open
- Country (sports): China
- Residence: Xi'an, Shaanxi, China
- Born: 5 February 1994 (age 32) Xi'an, Shaanxi, China
- Height: 1.70 m (5 ft 7 in)
- Turned pro: 2008
- Plays: Right-handed (two-handed backhand)
- Coach: Alan Ma
- Prize money: US$ 4,713,887

Singles
- Career record: 336–255
- Career titles: 1
- Highest ranking: No. 34 (2 March 2020)

Grand Slam singles results
- Australian Open: 2R (2016, 2020)
- French Open: 2R (2021)
- Wimbledon: 2R (2018)
- US Open: 2R (2014, 2016, 2017)

Other tournaments
- Olympic Games: 2R (2016)

Doubles
- Career record: 257–198
- Career titles: 6
- Highest ranking: No. 15 (11 July 2016)
- Current ranking: No. 138 (25 May 2026)

Grand Slam doubles results
- Australian Open: SF (2013, 2016)
- French Open: F (2019)
- Wimbledon: 3R (2019)
- US Open: QF (2019)

Other doubles tournaments
- Olympic Games: 2R (2016)

Grand Slam mixed doubles results
- Australian Open: QF (2020)
- Wimbledon: 3R (2019)
- US Open: 1R (2013)

Team competitions
- Fed Cup: 11–7
Medal record
Representing China
Women's tennis
Asian Games
Silver medal – second place	2014 Incheon	Team event
Youth Olympic Games
Gold medal – first place	2010 Singapore	Doubles
Silver medal – second place	2010 Singapore	Singles
- Last updated on: 6 June 2026.

Zheng Saisai
- Traditional Chinese: 鄭賽賽
- Simplified Chinese: 郑赛赛
Transcriptions
Standard Mandarin
- Hanyu Pinyin: Zhèng Sài Sài
- IPA: [ʈʂə̂ŋ sâɪ sâɪ]

Zheng Saisai (Chinese: 郑赛赛; born 5 February 1994) is a Chinese professional tennis player. She has a best singles ranking of 34, achieved in March 2020, and a career-high doubles ranking of world No. 15, achieved in July 2016. In her career, she has won one singles title in 2019 (at the Premier event in Silicon Valley), and six doubles titles on the WTA Tour. She also reached the final of the 2019 French Open with compatriot Duan Yingying.

In addition, she has won three singles and three doubles titles at WTA 125 tournaments, as well as twelve singles and nine doubles titles on the ITF Women's Circuit.

Playing for China Fed Cup team, Zheng has a win–loss record of 11–7 as of May 2026.

== Early life and background ==
Zheng started playing tennis at age eight at tennis academy where mother worked. She stated that her tennis idol growing up was Justine Henin. Her favorite tournaments are Australian Open and Wimbledon. Zheng is coached by Alan Ma (马伟开). Her favorite shot is drop shot.

Her father is of Tibetan ethnicity. She also has a Tibetan name, Suodian Zhuoma (Chinese: 索典卓玛).

Her nickname is Jaguar, for her footwork and defence.

== Career ==
=== 2008–12: WTA Tour debut & top 100 in doubles ===
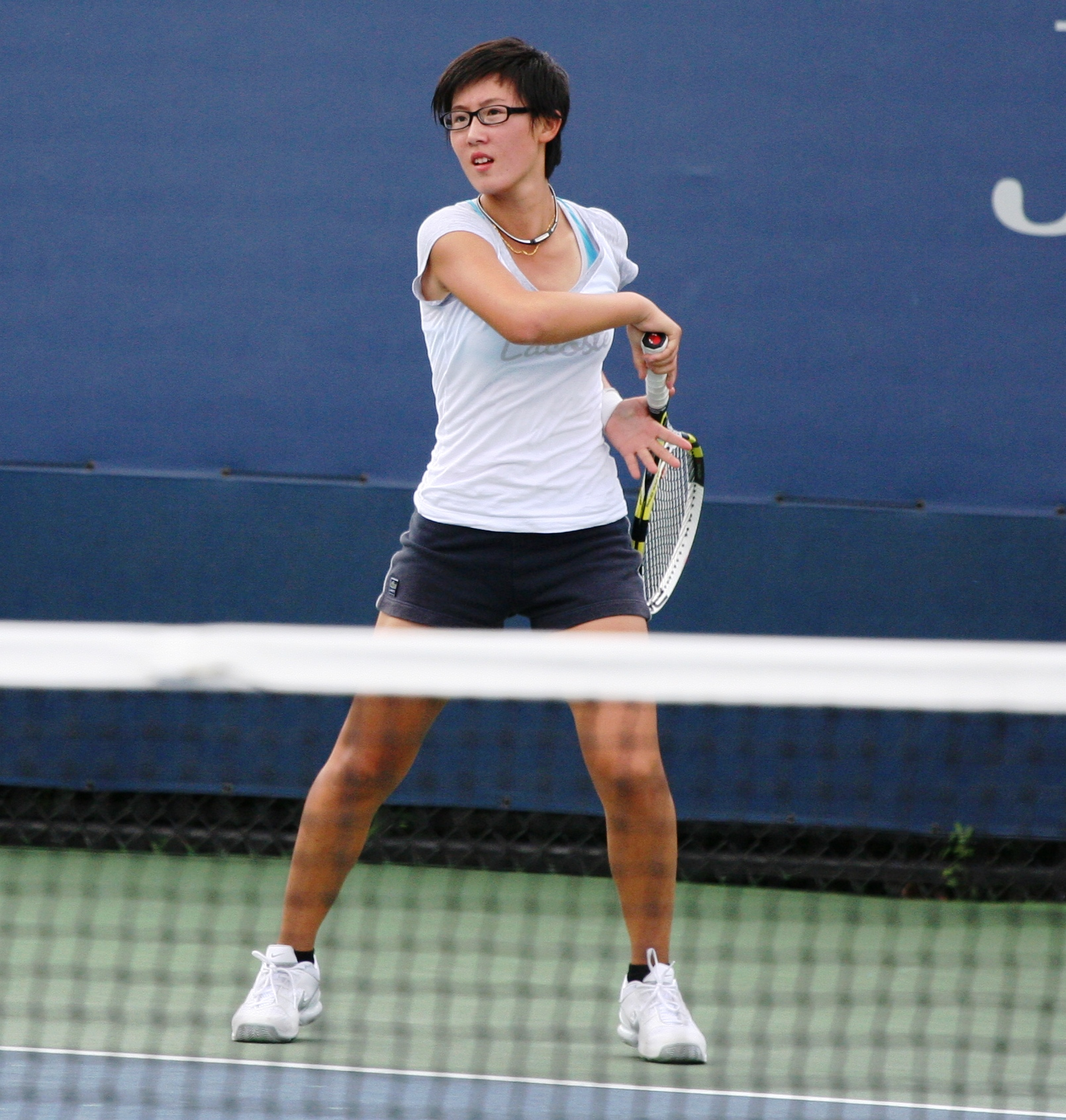
Zheng at the 2010 US Open

Zheng began playing on the ITF Women's Circuit in June 2008, at the age of 14, where, at the $25k Qian Shan, she lost in the first round of qualifying against fellow Chinese Zhou Xiao. Her first main-draw appearance happened next year, at a $10k event in Jiangmen in February. In July 2009, she played her first ITF singles final and also win the trophy, at the $10k Shenzhen, after defeating Sabina Sharipova in the final. On the same tournament, she also made her doubles debut, but lost in the first round. In July 2010, she won her first ITF doubles title at the $10k Hefei, alongside Tian Ran. She won one singles title, at the $10k Taipei in October 2010.

In September 2011, Zheng made her WTA Tour debut in both singles and doubles at the Guangzhou International Open. There she won her first doubles title, partnering Hsieh Su-wei and defeating Chan Chin-wei and Han Xinyun in straight sets. In singles, she lost in the first round. Week later, she made her debut at the Premier Mandatory China Open as a wildcard player only in singles, but lost in round one. During the year, she also performed on the ITF Circuit in doubles, winning the $100k Ningbo Challenger alongside Tetiana Luzhanska in September 2011, right before she made her WTA Tour debut. As the year passed by, Zheng progressed more and more in doubles ranking, starting the year as No. 794 and finishing the year as world No. 108. In singles, she rose from 670 to No. 276.

At the 2012 French Open, Zheng made her doubles major debut and also won her first match there. Later, she had her first attempts to be part of the Grand Slam tournament main draw in singles, but lost in the qualifying of Wimbledon, and later of the US Open. In July 2012, she won her first singles match at the Premier-level Stanford Classic, defeating Ayumi Morita in the first round. For the second year-in-a-row, she played at the China Open as wildcard player, but again lost in the first round. This time she also played in doubles, but lost in the first round. During the season, she progress in singles ranking, entering top 150 for the first time in September and finished year as world No. 133. In doubles, she debuted in the top 100 in February 2012, then rose to No. 84 in July, but finished the year as world No. 98.

=== 2013–15: Australian Open semifinal in doubles ===
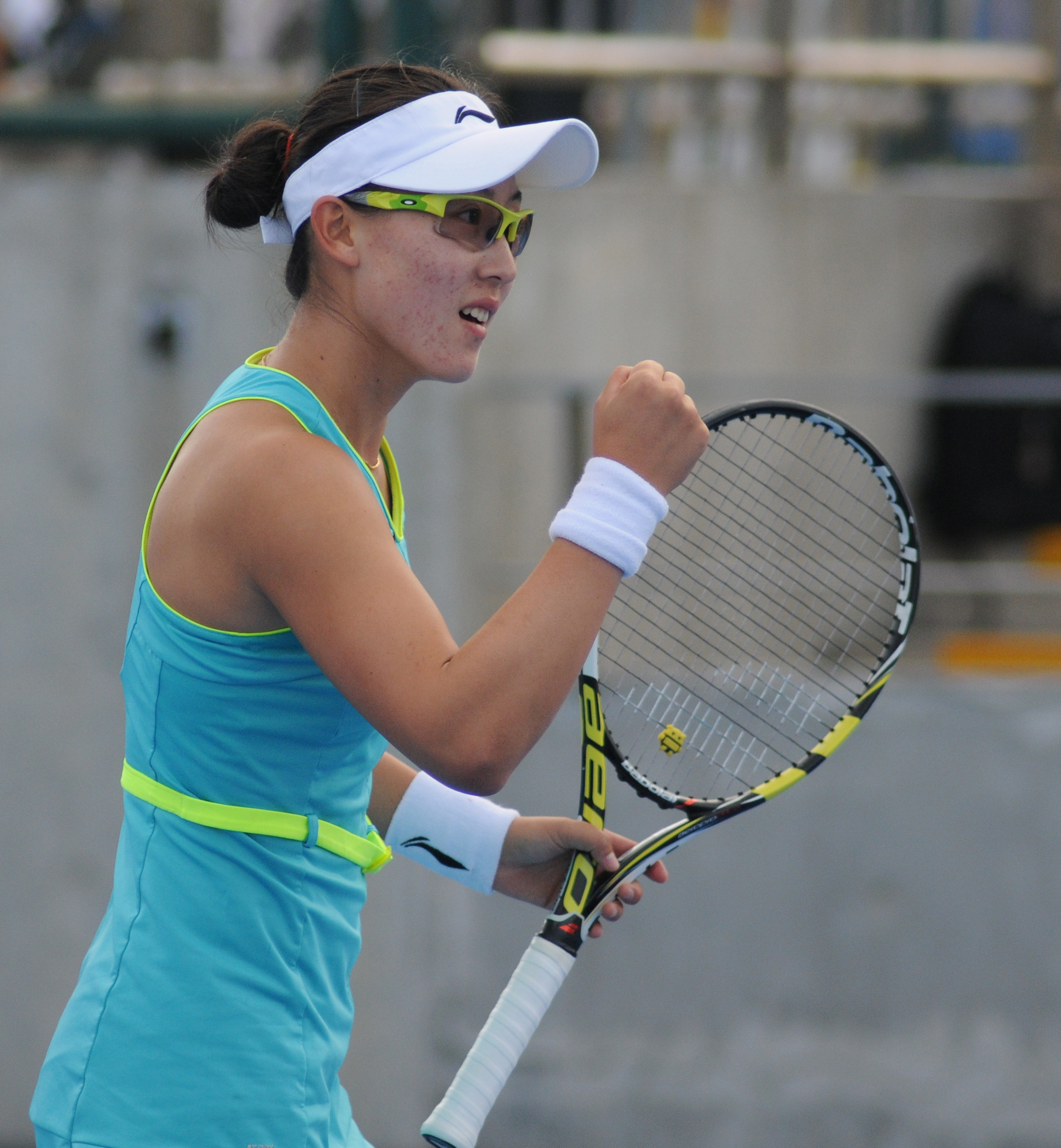
Zheng at the 2014 China Open

Zheng had a strong start of the year, reaching Australian Open doubles semifinal as her first significant major result. In that semifinal match, she partnered with Varvara Lepchenko, and they were defeated by Australians Ashleigh Barty and Casey Dellacqua, in straight sets. She still do not shine in singles, but continued with good performances in doubles, reaching quarterfinals at the French Open, also with Lepchenko, where they were defeated by top-seeded Italian duo Sara Errani and Roberta Vinci, in straight sets. In August, she made progress in singles, reaching the final of the Suzhou Ladies Open, but lost to Shahar Peer. By the end of the year, in singles, she reached two WTA 125 quarterfinals, in Nanjing and Taipei, while at both those tournaments she reached semifinals in doubles. She also reached semifinal of the International-level Japan Women's Open in doubles. In the doubles ranking, Zheng debut in the top 50 in doubles, getting to place 49 in March, and then rose to No. 38, that also was her year-end ranking. In singles, she made ups and downs in the rankings, but spent whole year inside top 200. She finished the year as world No. 162.

Things became better for Zheng in singles in 2014. She had her major main-draw debut in singles, passed qualifying at the US Open and also then her first match-win there. She defeated Stefanie Vögele in the first round, but then lost to Lucie Šafářová. She then had success at both WTA Tour and WTA 125 tournaments. On WTA Tour, she first reached quarterfinals of the Hong Kong Open and then semifinals of the Tianjin Open, while on the Challenger Tour, she reached quarterfinals in Suzhou, Ningbo and Taipei. During the year, she reached one final in doubles, at the Malaysian Open in April. On 13 October 2014, she entered top 100 in singles, when she reached the spot of world No. 92. Zheng finished 2014 season as the 97th. In doubles, she had ups and downs but spent the whole year inside top 100 and finished world No. 81.

During the 2015 season, Zheng has good performances, both in singles and doubles. Her most valued title of the year was at the Premier-level Stanford Classic in doubles event in August. That was her first final and title from higher-level tournament. Along with that, in October she won Tianjin Open, also in doubles. In singles, her most recognized result of the year was in the first week of the year, at the Shenzhen Open, where she reached semifinals.

In the second half of 2015, she reached two quarterfinals, at the Japan Women's Open and Guangzhou International Open. On the WTA Challenger Tour, she reached final of the Dalian Open in singles, while in doubles she won the title, and so she did at the Jiangxi Open. On the ITF Circuit, she won two $75k titles in singles and one in doubles. At the end of the year, she was handed a wildcard for the 2015 WTA Elite Trophy in singles. However, she lost both matches in the round-robin group, to Madison Keys and Venus Williams.

=== 2016–18: Top 15 in doubles & top 50 in singles year-end rankings ===
She reached the semifinals at the 2016 Australian Open and was a quarterfinalist at the 2016 French Open in women's doubles with Xu Yifan.

=== 2019–21: Maiden career title and top 35 in singles, French Open doubles final ===
At the 2019 French Open, Zheng made her first Grand Slam final, alongside Duan Yingying; they lost against Tímea Babos and Kristina Mladenovic, in straight sets.

In August, Zheng won her first WTA Tour singles title at the Silicon Valley Classic when she defeated second-seeded Aryna Sabalenka in the final.

She reached her career-high singles ranking of world No. 34 on 2 March 2020, following a second quarterfinal showing at the Qatar Ladies Open with a win over world No. 6 and seventh seed, Kiki Bertens.

=== 2024: Italian Open semifinal, sixth title, back to top 75, third Olympics ===
Following her comeback after two years hiatus, using protected ranking, she reached the second round at the Miami Open and the quarterfinals for a second time at the Madrid Open with Wang Xinyu. She also reached the semifinals for the first time at the next WTA 1000, the Italian Open, again with Wang Xinyu, upsetting top seeds Hsieh/Mertens to face third seeds Gauff/Routliffe for a spot in the final. Following her sixth title, at the 2024 Berlin Ladies Open with Wang Xinyu, she returned to the top 75 in the doubles rankings, raising more than 50 positions on 24 June 2024.

Using protected ranking, she participated in her third Olympics in Paris in doubles with Wang Xinyu.

=== 2025: Singapore doubles final ===
Partnering Wang Xinyu, Zheng reached the doubles final at the Singapore Open, losing to second seeds Desirae Krawczyk and Giuliana Olmos.

== Performance timelines ==
Key
W	F	SF	QF	#R	RR	Q#	DNQ	A	NH

(W) winner; (F) finalist; (SF) semifinalist; (QF) quarterfinalist; (#R) rounds 4, 3, 2, 1; (RR) round-robin stage; (Q#) qualification round; (DNQ) did not qualify; (A) absent; (NH) not held; (SR) strike rate (events won / competed); (W–L) win–loss record.
To avoid confusion and double counting, these charts are updated at the conclusion of a tournament or when the player's participation has ended.

Only main-draw results in WTA Tour, Grand Slam tournaments, Fed Cup/Billie Jean King Cup and Olympic Games are included in win–loss records.

=== Singles ===
Tournament	2011	2012	2013	2014	2015	2016	2017	2018	2019	2020	2021	...	2024	2025	SR	W–L	Win %
Grand Slam tournaments
Australian Open	A	A	Q1	Q1	1R	2R	1R	A	1R	2R	1R		A	1R	0 / 7	2–7	22%
French Open	A	A	Q1	Q2	1R	1R	1R	1R	1R	A	2R		A	A	0 / 6	1–6	14%
Wimbledon	A	Q2	A	Q1	1R	1R	1R	2R	1R	NH	A		A	A	0 / 5	1–5	17%
US Open	A	Q3	Q1	2R	1R	2R	2R	Q1	1R	A	A		1R	A	0 / 6	3–6	33%
Win–loss	0–0	0–0	0–0	1–1	0–4	2–4	1–4	1–2	0–4	1–1	1–2		0–1	0–1	0 / 24	7–24	23%
Year-end championships
WTA Elite Trophy (Note: WTA Tournament of Champions was held from 2009 to 2014, when WTA Elite Trophy replaced it.)	DNQ				RR	DNQ			SF	NH					0 / 2	1–4	20%
National representation
Summer Olympics	NH	A	NH			2R	NH				1R		A		0 / 2	1–2	33%
WTA 1000
Qatar Open	NTI	A	A	A	NTI	QF	NTI	A	NTI	QF	NTI		Q1	Q1	0 / 2	6–2	75%
Dubai Tennis Championships	A	NTI			A	NTI	2R	A	2R	NTI	1R		A	A	0 / 3	2–3	40%
Indian Wells Open	A	A	Q1	A	1R	Q2	A	A	1R	NH	1R		A	A	0 / 3	0–3	0%
Miami Open	A	A	A	A	2R	1R	A	A	1R	NH	2R		A	A	0 / 4	1–4	20%
Madrid Open	A	A	A	A	A	Q1	2R	A	3R	NH	2R		A	A	0 / 3	4–3	57%
Italian Open	A	A	A	A	A	Q1	Q1	A	1R	A	1R		A	A	0 / 2	0–2	0%
Canadian Open	A	A	A	A	A	1R	A	A	1R	NH	A		A	A	0 / 2	0–2	0%
Cincinnati Open	A	A	A	A	A	1R	A	A	2R	A	A		A	A	0 / 2	1–2	33%
Pan Pacific / Wuhan Open (Note: In 2014, the Pan Pacific Open was downgraded to a Premier event and replaced by the Wuhan Open. The Premier 5 tournaments were reclassified as WTA 1000 tournaments in 2021.)	A	A	A	A	1R	1R	A	2R	A	NH			A	A	0 / 3	1–3	25%
China Open	1R	1R	Q1	A	1R	1R	A	2R	3R	NH			A	A	0 / 6	3–6	33%
Career statistics
Tournaments	2	3	3	6	21	24	10	12	23	4	18				Career total: 126		
Titles	0	0	0	0	0	0	0	0	1	0	0				Career total: 1		
Finals	0	0	0	0	0	0	0	1	1	0	0				Career total: 2		
Overall win–loss	0–2	2–3	1–3	6–6	9–22	13–24	5–10	13–12	21–24	6–4	10–18				1 / 126	86–128	40%
Win (%)	0%	40%	25%	50%	29%	35%	33%	52%	47%	60%	36%				Career total: 40%		
Year-end ranking	276	133	162	97	70	85	94	46	39	41	80		695	873	$4,172,018		

=== Doubles ===
Tournament	2011	2012	2013	2014	2015	2016	2017	2018	2019	2020	2021	...	2024	2025	2026	SR	W–L	Win%
Grand Slam tournaments
Australian Open	A	A	SF	1R	1R	SF	3R	A	1R	1R	1R		A	3R	1R	0 / 10	12–10	55%
French Open	A	2R	QF	2R	2R	QF	QF	1R	F	A	2R		A	2R	A	0 / 10	19–10	66%
Wimbledon	A	1R	2R	A	1R	1R	A	A	3R	NH	A		1R	1R		0 / 7	3–7	30%
US Open	A	1R	2R	2R	2R	3R	2R	1R	QF	A	A		1R	1R		0 / 10	9–10	47%
Win–loss	0–0	1–3	9–4	2–3	2–4	9–4	6–3	0–2	10–4	0–1	1–2		0–2	3–4	0–1	0 / 37	43–37	54%
National representation
Summer Olympics	NH	A	NH			2R	NH				1R		1R	NH		0 / 3	1–3	25%
WTA 1000
Qatar Open	NTI	A	A	A	NTI	2R	NTI	A	NTI	1R	NTI		A	1R	A	0 / 6	1–6	14%
Dubai Tennis Championships	A	NTI			A	NTI	1R	NTI	1R	NTI	1R		A	1R	A	0 / 6	1–6	14%
Indian Wells Open	A	A	1R	A	A	2R	A	A	A	NH	1R		A	A	A	0 / 3	1–3	25%
Miami Open	A	A	A	A	1R	SF	A	A	A	NH	1R		2R	QF	A	0 / 5	6–5	55%
Madrid Open	A	A	A	A	A	2R	A	A	A	NH	QF		QF	1R	A	0 / 4	5–4	56%
Italian Open	A	A	A	2R	A	1R	QF	A	A	A	2R		SF	1R	A	0 / 6	6–6	50%
Canadian Open	A	A	A	A	A	1R	A	A	1R	NH	A		A	A		0 / 2	0–2	0%
Cincinnati Open	A	A	1R	A	A	2R	A	1R	1R	A	A		1R	A		0 / 5	1–5	17%
Pan Pacific / Wuhan Open	A	A	A	A	1R	1R	A	2R	A	NH			A	A		0 / 3	1–3	25%
China Open	A	1R	1R	1R	1R	1R	A	1R	1R	NH			A	A		0 / 7	0–7	0%
Career statistics
Tournaments	1	8	11	11	15	23	8	10	15	5	16		12	18	3	Career total: 156		
Titles	1	0	0	0	2	0	0	0	1	0	1		1	0		Career total: 6		
Finals	1	0	0	1	3	1	0	0	2	2	3		1	1		Career total: 15		
Overall win–loss	4–0	2–8	13–10	7–11	16–13	23–23	10–8	4–9	17–14	8–5	15–14		11–11	11–18	1–3	6 / 153	142–148	49%
Year-end ranking	108	98	39	81	39	24	65	151	27	28	43		70	81				

== Grand Slam tournament finals ==
=== Doubles: 1 (runner-up) ===
Result	Year	Tournament	Surface	Partner	Opponents	Score
Loss	2019	French Open	Clay	(China) Duan Yingying	(Hungary) Tímea Babos (France) Kristina Mladenovic	2–6, 3–6

== WTA Tour finals ==
=== Singles: 2 (1 title, 1 runner-up) ===
Legend Premier / WTA 500 (1–0) International / WTA 250 (0–1)	Finals by surface Hard (1–1)	Finals by setting Outdoors (1–1)

Result	W–L	Date	Tournament	Tier	Surface	Opponent	Score
Loss	0–1	Jul 2018	Jiangxi International Open, China	International	Hard	(China) Wang Qiang	5–7, 0–4 ret.
Win	1–1	Aug 2019	Silicon Valley Classic, United States	Premier	Hard	(Belarus) Aryna Sabalenka	6–3, 7–6^{(7–3)}

=== Doubles: 16 (6 titles, 10 runner-ups) ===
Legend Grand Slam (0–1) WTA 1000 (0–0) Premier / WTA 500 (2–1) International / WTA 250 (4–8)	Finals by surface Hard (5–8) Clay (0–2) Grass (1–0)	Finals by setting Outdoor (5–8) Indoor (1–2)

Result	W–L	Date	Tournament	Tier	Surface	Partner	Opponents	Score
Win	1–0	Sep 2011	Guangzhou Open, China	International	Hard	(Chinese Taipei) Hsieh Su-wei	(Chinese Taipei) Chan Chin-wei (China) Han Xinyun	6–2, 6–1
Loss	1–1	Apr 2014	Malaysian Open, Malaysia	International	Hard	(Chinese Taipei) Chan Yung-jan	(Hungary) Tímea Babos (Chinese Taipei) Chan Hao-ching	3–6, 4–6
Loss	1–2	May 2015	Internationaux de Strasbourg, France	International	Clay	(Ukraine) Nadiia Kichenok	(Chinese Taipei) Chuang Chia-jung (China) Liang Chen	6–4, 4–6, [10–12]
Win	2–2	Aug 2015	Silicon Valley Classic, US	Premier	Hard	(China) Xu Yifan	(Spain) Anabel Medina Garrigues (Spain) Arantxa Parra Santonja	6–1, 6–3
Win	3–2	Oct 2015	Tianjin Open, China	International	Hard	(China) Xu Yifan	(Croatia) Darija Jurak (United States) Nicole Melichar	6–2, 3–6, [10–8]
Loss	3–3	Jan 2016	Shenzhen Open, China	International	Hard	(China) Xu Yifan	(United States) Vania King (Romania) Monica Niculescu	1–6, 4–6
Win	4–3	Mar 2019	Abierto Mexicano, Mexico	International	Hard	(Belarus) Victoria Azarenka	(United States) Desirae Krawczyk (Mexico) Giuliana Olmos	6–1, 6–2
Loss	4–4	Jun 2019	French Open	Grand Slam	Clay	(China) Duan Yingying	(Hungary) Tímea Babos (France) Kristina Mladenovic	2–6, 3–6
Loss	4–5	Jan 2020	Shenzhen Open, China	International	Hard	(China) Duan Yingying	(Czech Republic) Barbora Krejčíková (Czech Republic) Kateřina Siniaková	2–6, 6–3, [4–10]
Loss	4–6	Feb 2020	Dubai Championships, UAE	Premier	Hard	(Czech Republic) Barbora Krejčíková	(Chinese Taipei) Hsieh Su-wei (Czech Republic) Barbora Strýcová	5–7, 6–3, [5–10]
Loss	4–7	Mar 2021	Monterrey Open, Mexico	WTA 250	Hard	(United Kingdom) Heather Watson	(United States) Caroline Dolehide (United States) Asia Muhammad	2–6, 3–6
Win	5–7	Oct 2021	Courmayeur Open, Italy	WTA 250	Hard (i)	(China) Wang Xinyu	(Japan) Eri Hozumi (China) Zhang Shuai	6–4, 3–6, [10–5]
Loss	5–8	Nov 2021	Linz Open, Austria	WTA 250	Hard (i)	(China) Wang Xinyu	(Russia) Natela Dzalamidze (Russia) Kamilla Rakhimova	4–6, 2–6
Win	6–8	Jun 2024	Berlin Ladies Open, Germany	WTA 500	Grass	(China) Wang Xinyu	(Chinese Taipei) Chan Hao-ching; Veronika Kudermetova	6–2, 7–5
Loss	6–9	Feb 2025	Singapore Open, Singapore	WTA 250	Hard	(China) Wang Xinyu	(United States) Desirae Krawczyk (Mexico) Giuliana Olmos	5–7, 0–6
Loss	6–10	Feb 2026	Transylvania Open, Romania	WTA 250	Hard (i)	(China) Wang Xinyu	(Uzbekistan) Kamilla Rakhimova (Spain) Sara Sorribes Tormo	6–7^{(7–9)}, 3–6

== WTA 125 finals ==
=== Singles: 5 (3 titles, 2 runner-ups) ===
Result	W–L	Date	Tournament	Surface	Opponent	Score
Loss	1–0	Aug 2013	Suzhou Ladies Open, China	Hard	(Israel) Shahar Pe'er	2–6, 6–2, 3–6
Win	1–1	Sep 2015	Dalian Open, China	Hard	(Israel) Julia Glushko	2–6, 6–1, 7–5
Win	2–1	Apr 2018	Zhengzhou Open, China	Hard	(China) Wang Yafan	5–7, 6–2, 6–1
Loss	2–2	May 2018	Kunming Open, China	Clay	(Russia) Irina Khromacheva	6–3, 4–6, 6–7^{(5–7)}
Win	3–2	Apr 2019	Kunming Open, China	Clay	(China) Zhang Shuai	6–4, 6–1

=== Doubles: 3 (3 titles) ===
Result	W–L	Date	Tournament	Surface	Partner	Opponents	Score
Win	1–0	Aug 2015	Jiangxi Open, China	Hard	(Chinese Taipei) Chang Kai-chen	(Chinese Taipei) Chan Chin-wei (China) Wang Yafan	6–3, 4–6, [10–3]
Win	2–0	Sep 2015	Dalian Open, China	Hard	(China) Zhang Kailin	(Chinese Taipei) Chan Chin-wei (Croatia) Darija Jurak	6–3, 6–4
Win	3–0	Sep 2021	Columbus Challenger, United States	Hard (i)	(China) Wang Xinyu	(Slovenia) Dalila Jakupović (Spain) Nuria Párrizas Díaz	6–1, 6–1

== ITF Circuit finals ==
=== Singles: 20 (12 titles, 8 runner-ups) ===
Legend
$100,000 tournaments (2–1)
$75,000 tournaments (2–0)
$50/60,000 tournaments (5–3)
$25,000 tournaments (1–2)
$10,000 tournaments (2–2)

Result	W–L	Date	Tournament	Tier	Surface	Opponent	Score
Win	1–0	Jul 2009	ITF Shenzhen, China	10,000	Hard	(Uzbekistan) Sabina Sharipova	7–5, 6–4
Loss	1–1	Apr 2010	ITF Ningbo, China	10,000	Hard	(China) Tian Ran	6–2, 6–3
Loss	1–2	Jun 2010	ITF Hefei, China	10,000	Hard	(China) Duan Yingying	6–3, 6–4
Win	2–2	Oct 2010	ITF Taipei, Taiwan	10,000	Hard	(Hong Kong) Zhang Ling	6–3, 6–3
Loss	2–3	Jan 2011	ITF Muzaffarnagar, India	25,000	Grass	(Slovenia) Tadeja Majerič	6–2, 5–7, 6–2
Loss	2–4	Jan 2011	Burnie International, Australia	25,000	Hard	(Canada) Eugenie Bouchard	6–4, 6–3
Loss	2–5	Apr 2012	ITF Wenshan, China	50,000	Hard	(Chinese Taipei) Hsieh Su-wei	6–3, 6–3
Win	3–5	May 2012	Kurume Cup, Japan	50,000	Grass	(Australia) Monique Adamczak	7–5, 6–2
Win	4–5	Oct 2012	ITF Taipei, Taiwan	25,000	Hard	(Kazakhstan) Zarina Diyas	6–4, 6–1
Loss	4–6	Sep 2013	ITF Sanya, China	50,000	Hard	(Czech Republic) Karolína Plíšková	6–3, 6–4
Win	5–6	May 2014	Anning Open, China	50,000	Clay	(Serbia) Jovana Jakšić	6–2, 6–3
Win	6–6	Apr 2015	Kangaroo Cup, Japan	75,000	Hard	(Japan) Naomi Osaka	3–6, 7–5, 6–4
Win	7–6	May 2015	Anning Open, China (2)	75,000	Clay	(China) Han Xinyun	6–4, 3–6, 6–4
Loss	7–7	Mar 2017	Zhuhai Open, China	60,000	Hard	(Czech Republic) Denisa Allertová	3–6, 6–2, 4–6
Win	8–7	Apr 2017	Blossom Cup, China	60,000	Hard	(China) Liu Fangzhou	6–2, 6–3
Win	9–7	Apr 2017	Kunming Open, China	100,000+H	Clay	(Kazakhstan) Zarina Diyas	7–5, 6–4
Win	10–7	Apr 2018	Blossom Cup, China (2)	60,000	Hard	(China) Liu Fangzhou	6–3, 6–1
Win	11–7	Oct 2018	Suzhou Ladies Open, China	100,000	Hard	(Slovakia) Jana Čepelová	7–5, 6–1
Loss	11–8	Nov 2018	Shenzhen Longhua Open, China	100,000	Hard	(Serbia) Ivana Jorović	3–6, 6–2, 4–6
Win	12–8	Sep 2021	Caldas da Rainha Open, Portugal	60,000+H	Hard	(France) Harmony Tan	6–4, 3–6, 6–3

=== Doubles: 16 (9 titles, 7 runner-ups) ===
Legend
$100,000 tournaments (2–1)
$75,000 tournaments (2–1)
$50,000 tournaments (1–0)
$25,000 tournaments (3–4)
$10,000 tournaments (1–1)

Result	W–L	Date	Tournament	Tier	Surface	Partner	Opponents	Score
Win	1–0	Jun 2010	ITF Hefei, China	10,000	Hard	(China) Tian Ran	(China) Bai Xi (China) Zhang Kailin	6–0, 6–4
Loss	1–1	Oct 2010	ITF Taipei, Taiwan	10,000	Hard	(Chinese Taipei) Juan Ting-fei	(Chinese Taipei) Kao Shao-yuan (China) Wang Qiang	6–3, 7–6^{(7–2)}
Win	2–1	May 2011	ITF Changwon, South Korea	25,000	Hard	(Chinese Taipei) Chan Hao-ching	(Japan) Yurika Sema (Japan) Erika Takao	6–2, 4–6, [11–9]
Loss	2–2	Aug 2011	Beijing Challenger, China	75,000	Hard	(United States) Tetiana Luzhanska	(Chinese Taipei) Chan Hao-ching (Chinese Taipei) Chan Yung-jan	6–2, 6–3
Win	3–2	Sep 2011	Ningbo International, China	100,000	Hard	(United States) Tetiana Luzhanska	(Chinese Taipei) Chan Chin-wei (China) Han Xinyun	6–4, 5–7, [10–4]
Loss	3–3	Feb 2012	Launceston International, Australia	25,000	Hard	(Chinese Taipei) Hsieh Shu-ying	(Japan) Kotomi Takahata (Japan) Shuko Aoyama	6–4, 6–4
Win	4–3	Mar 2012	ITF Sanya, China	25,000	Hard	(Japan) Erika Sema	(China) Liang Chen (China) Zhou Yimiao	6–2, 6–2
Loss	4–4	Mar 2012	ITF Phuket, Thailand	25,000	Hard	(Chinese Taipei) Chan Chin-wei	(Russia) Natela Dzalamidze (Russia) Marta Sirotkina	4–6, 1–6
Win	5–4	Mar 2012	ITF Phuket, Thailand	25,000	Hard	(Thailand) Noppawan Lertcheewakarn	(China) Sun Shengnan (China) Han Xinyun	6–3, 6–3
Win	6–4	May 2012	Kangaroo Cup, Japan	50,000	Hard	(United States) Jessica Pegula	(Chinese Taipei) Chan Chin-wei (Chinese Taipei) Hsu Wen-hsin	6–4, 3–6, [10–4]
Loss	6–5	Sep 2012	Ningbo International, China	100,000	Hard	(United States) Tetiana Luzhanska	(Japan) Shuko Aoyama (Chinese Taipei) Chang Kai-chen	2–6, 5–7
Loss	6–6	Apr 2014	Nanning Open, China	25,000	Hard	(Hong Kong) Zhang Ling	(China) Zhang Kailin (China) Han Xinyun	6–7^{(8–10)}, 6–7^{(3–7)}
Win	7–6	May 2014	Empire Slovak Open	75,000	Clay	(Liechtenstein) Stephanie Vogt	(Russia) Margarita Gasparyan (Russia) Evgeniya Rodina	6–4, 6–2
Win	8–6	May 2015	Anning Open, China	75,000	Clay	(China) Xu Yifan	(China) Yang Zhaoxuan (China) Ye Qiuyu	7–5, 6–2
Win	9–6	Jul 2018	Contrexéville Open, France	100,000	Clay	(Belgium) An-Sophie Mestach	(India) Prarthana Thombare (Netherlands) Eva Wacanno	3–6, 6–2, [10–7]
Loss	9–7	Nov 2019	ITF Hua Hin, Thailand	25,000	Hard	(Hong Kong) Ng Kwan-yau	(Thailand) Tamarine Tanasugarn (Netherlands) Lesley Pattinama Kerkhove	2–6, 6–7^{(5–7)}

== Summer Youth Olympic Games ==
=== Singles: 1 (silver medal) ===
Result	Year	Host nation	Surface	Opponent	Score
Silver	2010	Singapore	Hard	(Russia) Daria Gavrilova	6–2, 2–6, 0–6

=== Doubles: 1 (gold medal) ===
Result	Year	Host nation	Surface	Partner	Opponents	Score
Gold	2010	Singapore	Hard	(China) Tang Haochen	(Slovakia) Jana Čepelová (Slovakia) Chantal Škamlová	6–4, 3–6, [10–4]

== Wins over top-10 players ==
#	Player	Rank	Event	Surface	Rd	Score
2016
1.	(Czech Republic) Petra Kvitová	No. 6	Shenzhen Open	Hard	1R	6–2, ret.
2.	(Germany) Angelique Kerber	No. 2	Qatar Ladies Open	Hard	2R	7–5, 6–1
3.	(Poland) Agnieszka Radwańska	No. 5	Rio Olympics	Hard	1R	6–4, 7–5
2017
4.	(Ukraine) Elina Svitolina	No. 10	Madrid Open	Clay	1R	2–6, 7–6^{(7–4)}, 6–3
2019
5.	(Belarus) Aryna Sabalenka	No. 10	Stanford Classic	Hard	F	6–3, 7–6^{(7–3)}
2020
6.	(Netherlands) Kiki Bertens	No. 6	Qatar Ladies Open	Hard	3R	3–6, 6–3, 6–4
