= Zhao Yijing =

Chinese tennis player

- Native name: 赵依静
- Country (sports): China
- Residence: Liaoning, China
- Born: 7 February 1989 (age 37) Liaoning
- Turned pro: 2004
- Plays: Left (two-handed backhand)
- Prize money: $63,439

Singles
- Career record: 142–95
- Career titles: 4 ITF
- Highest ranking: No. 244 (11 June 2012)

Doubles
- Career record: 97–70
- Career titles: 9 ITF
- Highest ranking: No. 222 (9 July 2012)

Zhao Yijing (Chinese: 赵依静; pinyin: Zhào Yījìng; Mandarin pronunciation: [ʈʂâʊ í tɕîŋ]; born 7 February 1989) is a Chinese former tennis player.

On 11 June 2012, she reached her career-high WTA singles ranking of 244. On 9 July 2012, she peaked at No. 222 in the doubles rankings. Zhao won four singles and nine doubles titles on the ITF Women's Circuit.

== Career ==
Zhao was accepted as a wildcard into the qualifying of the 2011 Guangzhou International Women's Open where she defeated eighth seed Hsu Wen-hsin and second seed Mădălina Gojnea. In the main draw, she defeated Misaki Doi in the first round, 6–4, 6–3. This was her first WTA Tour main-draw appearance. In the second round, she lost to Tetiana Luzhanska in three sets. After this performance, she rose 92 ranks to No. 345. She then also reached the final of a $10k event, losing to Luksika Kumkhum, leaving her end of year ranking at 318, an increase of 538 ranks from 2010.

In 2012, Zhao started off the year playing ITF events in China, losing in the first round of the Blossom Cup, then moving on to win both the singles and doubles in Pingguo.

== ITF Circuit finals ==
Legend
$100,000 tournaments
$50,000 tournaments
$25,000 tournaments
$10,000 tournaments

=== Singles (4–2) ===
Result	No.	Date	Tournament	Surface	Opponent	Score
Win	1.	13 May 2006	ITF New Delhi, India	Hard	(India) Sandhya Nagaraj	6–4, 4–6, 7–5
Win	2.	20 May 2006	ITF New Delhi, India	Hard	(China) Song Shanshan	6–2, 6–2
Win	3.	1 September 2007	ITF Saitama, Japan	Hard	(Japan) Mari Tanaka	6–4, 6–3
Loss	1.	13 September 2007	ITF Tokyo, Japan	Hard	(Australia) Sophie Ferguson	6–2, 6–4
Loss	2.	20 November 2011	ITF Manila, Philippines	Hard	(Thailand) Luksika Kumkhum	4–6, 6–4, 6–2
Win	4.	15 January 2012	ITF Pingguo, China	Hard	(Japan) Erika Takao	6–2, 6–4

=== Doubles (9–8) ===
Result	No.	Date	Location	Surface	Partner	Opponents	Score
Win	1.	May 2006	New Delhi, India	Hard	(China) Song Shanshan	(India) Rushmi Chakravarthi (India) Archana Venkataraman	6–3, 6–4
Loss	1.	May 2006	New Delhi, India	Hard	(China) Song Shanshan	(India) Rushmi Chakravarthi (India) Archana Venkataraman	6–7^{(5–7)}, 6–2, 6–4
Win	2.	Jul 2007	Miyazaki, Japan	Carpet	(China) Zhang Shuai	(Japan) Natsumi Hamamura (Japan) Ayaka Maekawa	6–4, 6–4
Win	3.	Aug 2007	Tokyo, Japan	Carpet	(China) Song Shanshan	(Japan) Maiko Inoue (Japan) Mari Inoue	6–3, 6–1
Loss	2.	Oct 2007	Beijing, China	Hard	(China) Liang Chen	(China) Ji Chunmei (China) Sun Shengnan	6–2, 6–3
Loss	3.	Jun 2008	Tokyo, Japan	Hard	(China) Liu Wanting	(Japan) Maya Kato (Japan) Miki Miyamura	6–4, 6–2
Win	4.	Apr 2010	Ningbo, China	Hard	(China) Liu Wanting	(China) Lu Jiaxing (China) Li Xi	6–0, 6–4
Win	5.	May 2011	Bangkok, Thailand	Hard	(China) Li Ting	(Indonesia) Ayu Fani Damayanti (Indonesia) Lavinia Tananta	6–7^{(2–7)}, 6–4, 6–4
Win	6.	Jun 2011	Pattaya, Thailand	Hard	(China) Liang Chen	(Thailand) Luksika Kumkhum (Thailand) Napatsakorn Sankaew	1–6, 6–1, 7–5
Loss	4.	Jun 2011	Pattaya, Thailand	Hard	(China) Liang Chen	(Japan) Emi Mutaguchi (Japan) Kotomi Takahata	4–6, 7–5, 6–4
Win	7.	Jul 2011	Pattaya, Thailand	Hard	(China) Liang Chen	(Japan) Misa Eguchi (Japan) Akiko Omae	6–3, 6–4
Win	8.	Jul 2011	Pattaya, Thailand	Hard	(China) Liang Chen	(Japan) Yurina Koshino (Thailand) Varatchaya Wongteanchai	6–1, 6–4
Loss	5.	Oct 2011	Jakarta, Indonesia	Hard	(Chinese Taipei) Kao Shao-yuan	(Thailand) Nicha Lertpitaksinchai (Thailand) Nungnadda Wannasuk	4–6, 4–6
Loss	6.	Nov 2011	Manila, Philippines	Hard	(China) Zheng Junyi	(Thailand) Luksika Kumkhum (Thailand) Peangtarn Plipuech	3–6, 0–6
Win	9.	Jan 2012	Pingguo, China	Hard	(Chinese Taipei) Kao Shao-yuan	(China) Liang Chen (China) Tian Ran	3–6, 7–6^{(7–3)}, [10–7]
Loss	7.	Oct 2012	Suzhou, China	Hard	(China) Yang Zhaoxuan	(Switzerland) Timea Bacsinszky (France) Caroline Garcia	5–7, 3–6
Loss	8.	Sep 2013	Sanya, China	Hard	(China) Yang Zhaoxuan	(China) Sun Ziyue (China) Xu Shilin	7–6^{(7–5)}, 3–6, [3–10]
