= Zhang Shuai career statistics =

Career finals
Discipline	Type	Won	Lost	Total
Singles	Grand Slam	–	–	–
Singles	WTA Finals	–	–	–
Singles	WTA Elite	–	–	–
Singles	WTA 1000	–	–	–
Singles	WTA 500	–	–	–
Singles	WTA 250	3	3	6
Singles	Olympics	–	–	–
Singles	Total	3	3	6
Doubles	Grand Slam	3	2	5
Doubles	WTA Finals	–	–	–
Doubles	WTA Elite	0	1	1
Doubles	WTA 1000	1	2	3
Doubles	WTA 500	4	5	9
Doubles	WTA 250	9	10	19
Doubles	Olympics	–	–	–
Doubles	Total	17	20	37

This is a list of the main career statistics of professional Chinese tennis player Zhang Shuai.

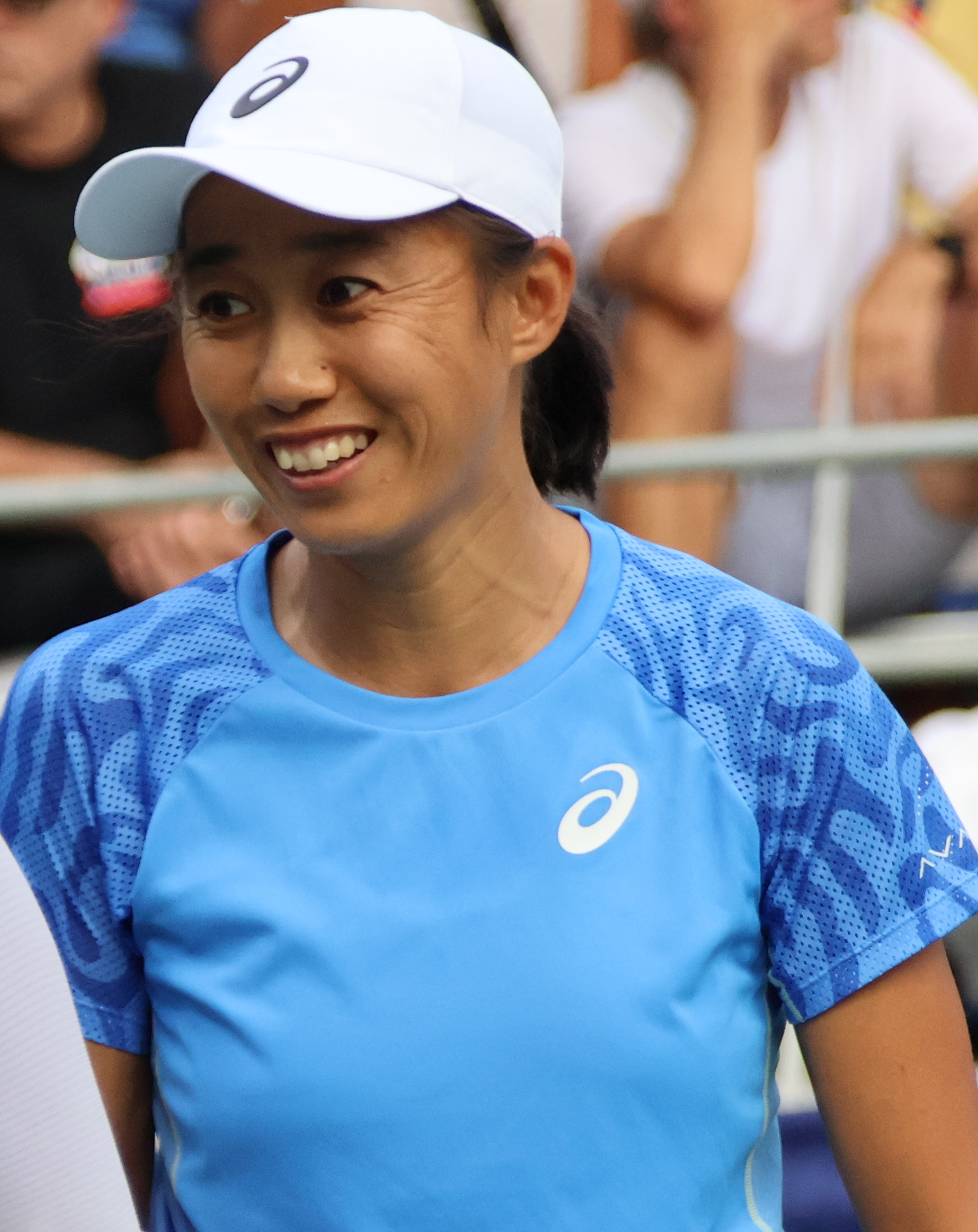
Zhang Shuai at the 2025 DC Open

== Performance timelines ==
Key
W	F	SF	QF	#R	RR	Q#	P#	DNQ	A	Z#	PO	G	S	B	NMS	NTI	P	NH

(W) winner; (F) finalist; (SF) semifinalist; (QF) quarterfinalist; (#R) rounds 4, 3, 2, 1; (RR) round-robin stage; (Q#) qualification round; (P#) preliminary round; (DNQ) did not qualify; (A) absent; (Z#) Davis/Fed Cup Zonal Group (with number indication) or (PO) play-off; (G) gold, (S) silver or (B) bronze Olympic/Paralympic medal; (NMS) not a Masters tournament; (NTI) not a Tier I tournament; (P) postponed; (NH) not held; (SR) strike rate (events won / competed); (W–L) win–loss record.
To avoid confusion and double counting, these charts are updated at the conclusion of a tournament or when the player's participation has ended.

Only main-draw results in WTA Tour, Grand Slam tournaments, Fed Cup/Billie Jean King Cup and Olympic Games are included in win–loss records.

=== Singles ===
Current through the 2026 Italian Open.

Tournament	2007	2008	2009	2010	2011	2012	2013	2014	2015	2016	2017	2018	2019	2020	2021	2022	2023	2024	2025	2026	SR	W–L	Win %
Grand Slam tournaments
Australian Open	Q1	Q3	A	Q1	1R	1R	A	1R	1R	QF	2R	2R	3R	3R	1R	3R	4R	A	2R	1R	0 / 14	16–14	53%
French Open	A	Q2	A	1R	1R	1R	A	1R	1R	2R	3R	2R	2R	4R	1R	1R	1R	A	Q2		0 / 13	8–13	38%
Wimbledon	A	A	A	Q2	1R	Q2	A	1R	Q3	1R	1R	1R	QF	NH	1R	3R	1R	1R	1R		0 / 11	6–11	35%
US Open	Q2	1R	Q2	Q2	1R	Q3	Q2	1R	Q2	3R	3R	1R	3R	1R	2R	4R	A	1R	1R		0 / 12	10–12	45%
Win–loss	0–0	0–1	0–0	0–1	0–4	0–2	0–0	0–4	0–2	7–4	5–4	2–4	9–4	5–3	1–4	7–4	3–3	0–2	1–3	0–1	0 / 50	40–50	44%
National representation
Summer Olympics	NH	A	Not Held			A	Not Held			2R	Not Held				A	Not Held		A	Not Held		0 / 1	1–1	50%
Year-end championships
WTA Elite Trophy (Note: WTA Tournament of Champions was held from 2009 to 2014, when WTA Elite Trophy replaced it.)	Not Held		Did Not Qualify							SF	Alt	RR	DNQ	Not Held			A	Not Held			0 / 1	0–2	0%
WTA 1000 tournaments
Qatar Open	NTI	A	Not Held		NTI	A	Q1	2R	NTI	A	NTI	1R	NTI	1R	NTI	1R	NTI	A	A	1R	0 / 5	1–5	17%
Dubai Championships	Not Tier I		A	Q2	2R	Not Tier I			Q1	NTI	1R	NTI	2R	NTI	A	NTI	1R	1R	Q2	Q1	0 / 5	2–5	29%
Indian Wells Open	A	A	A	A	2R	1R	A	1R	A	3R	2R	3R	2R	NH	1R	1R	2R	1R	A	1R	0 / 12	5–12	29%
Miami Open	A	A	A	A	1R	2R	Q2	1R	1R	2R	3R	2R	1R	NH	1R	3R	A	1R	A	1R	0 / 12	5–12	29%
Madrid Open	A	A	A	A	A	A	A	1R	A	A	1R	2R	1R	NH	1R	1R	A	1R	A	2R	0 / 8	2–8	20%
Italian Open	A	Q1	A	A	A	A	Q1	QF	Q1	A	1R	2R	1R	1R	1R	2R	A	A	A		0 / 7	5–7	42%
Canadian Open	A	A	A	A	1R	Q2	A	1R	A	1R	A	2R	2R	NH	1R	2R	1R	A	A		0 / 8	3–8	27%
Cincinnati Open	NTI		A	A	1R	A	A	2R	A	1R	A	A	Q1	1R	1R	QF	A	1R	A		0 / 7	4–7	36%
Wuhan Open (Note: In 2014, the Pan Pacific Open was downgraded to a Premier event and replaced by the Wuhan Open. The Premier 5 tournaments were reclassified as WTA 1000 tournaments in 2021.)	A	A	A	A	1R	A	A	A	A	2R	2R	3R	1R	Not Held				1R	3R		0 / 7	6–7	46%
China Open	NTI		3R	1R	1R	2R	2R	1R	1R	QF	2R	QF	1R	Not Held			A	QF	3R		0 / 13	17–13	57%
Career statistics
Tournaments	4 (Note: incl 2006)	6	1	4	22	6	5	24	12	20	25	27	23	10	24	27	8	12	9	10	Career total: 269		
Titles	0	0	0	0	0	0	1	0	0	0	1	0	0	0	0	1	0	0	0	0	Career total: 3		
Finals	0	0	0	0	0	0	1	0	0	0	1	0	0	1	1	2	0	0	0	0	Career total: 6		
Overall win–loss	0–5 (Note: incl 2006)	0–6	2–2	3–6	8–22	2–6	9–4	18–24	4–12	26–19	23–23	28–27	19–23	12–10	16–24	33–25	5–8	5–12	10–9	5–10	3 / 274	228–277	45%
Year-end ranking	155	212	153	91	126	122	51	62	186	23	36	35	46	35	63	24	245	205	102		$12,701,131		

=== Doubles ===
Current through the 2023 Australian Open.

Tournament	2007	2008	2009	2010	2011	2012	2013	2014	2015	2016	2017	2018	2019	2020	2021	2022	2023	2024	2025	2026	SR	W–L	Win%
Grand Slam tournaments
Australian Open	A	A	A	A	2R	1R	A	1R	1R	A	2R	A	W	1R	1R	2R	2R	A	QF	W	2 / 11	19–10	66%
French Open	A	A	A	A	2R	3R	3R	1R	A	1R	1R	1R	QF	3R	2R	3R	2R	2R	2R	3R	0 / 15	18–15	55%
Wimbledon	A	A	A	2R	3R	1R	2R	1R	A	2R	1R	1R	2R	NH	1R	F	SF	3R	3R	2R	0 / 15	20–15	57%
US Open	A	A	A	A	2R	QF	1R	A	A	2R	QF	SF	1R	1R	W	3R	A	F	3R	QF	1 / 13	30–12	71%
Win–loss	0–0	0–0	0–0	1–1	5–4	5–4	3–3	0–3	0–1	2–3	4–4	4–3	10–3	2–3	7–3	10–4	6–3	8–3	8–4	12–3	3 / 54	87–52	63%
National representation
Summer Olympics	NH	A	Not Held			2R	Not Held			2R	Not Held				A	Not Held					0 / 2	2–2	50%
Year-end championships
WTA Finals	Did Not Qualify												SF	NH	RR	Did Not Qualify					0 / 2	3–4	43%
WTA Elite Trophy	Not Held		Did Not Qualify								F	DNQ	A	Not Held				DNQ			0 / 1	2–1	67%
WTA 1000 tournaments
Dubai / Qatar Open (Note: The first Premier 5 event of the year has switched back and forth between the Dubai Tennis Championships and the Qatar Ladies Open since 2009. Dubai was classified as a Premier 5 event from 2009 to 2011 before being succeeded by Doha for the 2012–2014 period. In 2015, Dubai regained its Premier 5 status while Doha was demoted to Premier status. The Premier 5 tournaments were reclassified as WTA 1000 tournaments in 2021.)	NTI	A	A	A	1R	A	2R	2R	A	A	A	A	A	1R	A	QF	1R				0 / 6	3–6	33%
Indian Wells Open	A	A	A	A	A	1R	A	A	A	A	2R	A	1R	NH	1R	1R	1R				0 / 6	1–6	14%
Miami Open	A	A	A	A	A	1R	2R	A	A	A	1R	A	F	NH	2R	1R	A				0 / 6	6–6	50%
Madrid Open	NH		A	A	A	2R	1R	1R	A	A	2R	QF	QF	NH	QF	SF	A				0 / 8	9–8	53%
Italian Open	A	A	A	A	A	A	1R	2R	A	A	1R	A	QF	2R	1R	QF	A				0 / 7	3–7	30%
Canadian Open	A	A	A	A	2R	2R	A	1R	A	A	A	2R	1R	NH	A	QF	2R				0 / 7	5–7	42%
Cincinnati Open	NTI		A	A	A	A	1R	A	A	A	A	A	1R	1R	W	2R	A				1 / 5	5–4	56%
China Open	NTI		A	1R	1R	2R	1R	1R	A	A	A	1R	2R	Not Held			A				0 / 7	2–7	22%
Wuhan Open	A	A	A	A	1R	A	A	A	A	A	1R	1R	2R	Not Held							0 / 4	1–4	20%
Career statistics
Tournaments	5 (Note: incl 2006)	3	2	5	16	15	14	17	4	5	12	14	21	10	25	23	3	25	21	22	Career total: 262		
Titles	0	0	0	0	1	2	0	1	0	0	0	3	1	0	3	1	0	1	1	3	Career total: 17		
Finals	0	0	0	0	1	3	2	2	0	0	2	3	3	1	4	4	0	4	5	4	Career total: 38		
Overall win–loss	2–5 (Note: incl 2006)	4–3	0–2	7–5	16–15	22–12	12–14	16–15	1–4	3–5	12–10	21–10	25–21	4–10	35–23	32–20	12–9	28–23	38–21	38–18	17 / 262	326–240	58%
Year-end ranking	246	140	270	158	49	34	57	63	447	234	64	33	10	27	8	25	34	27	16				

=== Mixed doubles ===
Tournament	2012	2013	2014	2015	2016	2017	2018	2019	2020	2021	2022	2023	2024	W–L
Australian Open	A	A	A	A	A	A	A	1R	A	A	SF	A	A	3–2
French Open	A	2R	A	A	A	A	2R	QF	NH	A	1R	2R	QF	7–6
Wimbledon	1R	1R	2R	A	2R	A	2R	3R	NH	SF	2R	A	1R	8–9
US Open	A	A	A	A	A	A	SF	1R	NH	1R	SF	A	1R	6–5
Win–loss	0–1	1–2	1–1	0–0	1–1	0–0	5–3	3–4	0–0	3–2	7–4	1–1	2–3	24–22

== Grand Slam tournament finals ==
=== Doubles: 5 (3 titles, 2 runner-ups) ===
Result	Year	Tournament	Surface	Partner	Opponents	Score
Win	2019	Australian Open	Hard	(Australia) Samantha Stosur	(Hungary) Tímea Babos (France) Kristina Mladenovic	6–3, 6–4
Win	2021	US Open	Hard	(Australia) Samantha Stosur	(United States) Coco Gauff (United States) Caty McNally	6–3, 3–6, 6–3
Loss	2022	Wimbledon	Grass	(Belgium) Elise Mertens	(Czech Republic) Barbora Krejčíková (Czech Republic) Kateřina Siniaková	2–6, 4–6
Loss	2024	US Open	Hard	(France) Kristina Mladenovic	(Latvia) Jeļena Ostapenko (Ukraine) Lyudmyla Kichenok	4–6, 3–6
Win	2026	Australian Open (2)	Hard	(Belgium) Elise Mertens	(Kazakhstan) Anna Danilina (Serbia) Aleksandra Krunić	7–6^{(7–4)}, 6–4

== Other significant finals ==
=== WTA 1000 tournaments ===
==== Doubles: 5 (2 title, 3 runner-ups) ====
Result	Year	Tournament	Surface	Partner	Opponents	Score
Loss	2019	Miami Open	Hard	(Australia) Samantha Stosur	(Belgium) Elise Mertens (Belarus) Aryna Sabalenka	6–7^{(5–7)}, 2–6
Win	2021	Cincinnati Open	Hard	(Australia) Samantha Stosur	(Canada) Gabriela Dabrowski (Brazil) Luisa Stefani	7–5, 6–3
Loss	2025	Canadian Open	Hard	(United States) Taylor Townsend	(United States) Coco Gauff (United States) McCartney Kessler	4–6, 6–1, [11–13]
Win	2026	Canadian Open	Hard	(Czech Republic) Kateřina Siniaková	(Italy) Sara Errani (United States) Nicole Melichar-Martinez	6–3, 6–4
Loss	2026	China Open	Hard	(Czech Republic) Kateřina Siniaková	(Canada) Gabriela Dabrowski (Brazil) Luisa Stefani	1–6, 2–6

=== Year-end championships ===
==== Doubles: 1 (runner-up) ====
Result	Year	Tournament	Surface	Partner	Opponents	Score
Loss	2017	Elite Trophy, China	Hard (i)	(China) Lu Jingjing	(China) Duan Yingying (China) Han Xinyun	2–6, 1–6

== WTA Tour finals ==
=== Singles: 6 (3 titles, 3 runner-ups) ===
Legend International / WTA 250 (3–3)	Finals by surface Hard (3–1) Grass (0–2)	Finals by setting Outdoor (2–3) Indoor (1–0)

Result	W–L	Date	Tournament	Tier	Surface	Opponent	Score
Win	1–0	Sep 2013	Guangzhou Open, China	International	Hard	(United States) Vania King	7–6^{(7–1)}, 6–1
Win	2–0	Sep 2017	Guangzhou Open, China (2)	International	Hard	(Serbia) Aleksandra Krunić	6–2, 3–6, 6–2
Loss	2–1	Jan 2020	Hobart International, Australia	International	Hard	(Kazakhstan) Elena Rybakina	6–7^{(7–9)}, 3–6
Loss	2–2	Jun 2021	Nottingham Open, UK	WTA 250	Grass	(United Kingdom) Johanna Konta	2–6, 1–6
Win	3–2	Mar 2022	Lyon Open, France	WTA 250	Hard (i)	(Ukraine) Dayana Yastremska	3–6, 6–3, 6–4
Loss	3–3	Jun 2022	Birmingham Classic, UK	WTA 250	Grass	(Brazil) Beatriz Haddad Maia	4–5 ret.

=== Doubles: 40 (18 titles, 22 runner-ups) ===
Legend Grand Slam (3–2) WTA Elite (0–1) Premier M / WTA 1000 (2–3) Premier / WTA 500 (5–6) International / WTA 250 (9–10)	Finals by surface Hard (15–16) Clay (3–2) Grass (1–4)	Finals by setting Outdoor (18–16) Indoor (2–6)

Result	W–L	Date	Tournament	Tier	Surface	Partner	Opponents	Score
Win	1–0	Oct 2011	Japan Women's Open, Japan	International	Hard	(Japan) Kimiko Date-Krumm	(United States) Vania King (Kazakhstan) Yaroslava Shvedova	7–5, 3–6, [11–9]
Loss	1–1	Feb 2012	Monterrey Open, Mexico	International	Hard	(Japan) Kimiko Date-Krumm	(Italy) Sara Errani (Italy) Roberta Vinci	2–6, 6–7^{(6–8)}
Win	2–1	May 2012	Estoril Open, Portugal	International	Clay	(Chinese Taipei) Chuang Chia-jung	(Kazakhstan) Yaroslava Shvedova (Kazakhstan) Galina Voskoboeva	4–6, 6–1, [11–9]
Win	3–1	Sep 2012	Guangzhou Open, China	International	Hard	(Thailand) Tamarine Tanasugarn	(Australia) Jarmila Gajdošová (Romania) Monica Niculescu	2–6, 6–2, [10–8]
Loss	3–2	Mar 2013	Malaysian Open, Malaysia	International	Hard	(Slovakia) Janette Husárová	(Japan) Shuko Aoyama (Chinese Taipei) Chang Kai-chen	7–6^{(7–4)}, 6–7^{(4–7)}, [12–14]
Loss	3–3	Oct 2013	Japan Women's Open, Japan	International	Hard	(Australia) Samantha Stosur	(France) Kristina Mladenovic (Italy) Flavia Pennetta	4–6, 3–6
Loss	3–4	Jan 2014	Hobart International, Australia	International	Hard	(United States) Lisa Raymond	(Romania) Monica Niculescu (Czech Republic) Klára Zakopalová	2–6, 7–6^{(7–5)}, [8–10]
Win	4–4	Feb 2014	Pattaya Open, Thailand	International	Hard	(China) Peng Shuai	(Russia) Alla Kudryavtseva (Australia) Anastasia Rodionova	3–6, 7–6^{(7–5)}, [10–6]
Loss	4–5	Jun 2017	Birmingham Classic, UK	Premier	Grass	(Chinese Taipei) Chan Hao-ching	(Australia) Ashleigh Barty (Australia) Casey Dellacqua	1–6, 6–2, [8–10]
Loss	4–6	Nov 2017	WTA Elite Trophy, China	WTA Elite	Hard (i)	(China) Lu Jingjing	(China) Duan Yingying (China) Han Xinyun	2–6, 1–6
Win	5–6	Apr 2018	İstanbul Cup, Turkey	International	Clay	(China) Liang Chen	(Switzerland) Xenia Knoll (United Kingdom) Anna Smith	6–4, 6–4
Win	6–6	Sep 2018	Japan Women's Open, Japan (2)	International	Hard	(Japan) Eri Hozumi	(Japan) Miyu Kato (Japan) Makoto Ninomiya	6–2, 6–4
Win	7–6	Oct 2018	Hong Kong Open, China (SAR)	International	Hard	(Australia) Samantha Stosur	(Japan) Shuko Aoyama (Belarus) Lidziya Marozava	6–4, 6–4
Win	8–6	Jan 2019	Australian Open, Australia	Grand Slam	Hard	(Australia) Samantha Stosur	(Hungary) Tímea Babos (France) Kristina Mladenovic	6–3, 6–4
Loss	8–7	Mar 2019	Miami Open, US	Premier M	Hard	(Australia) Samantha Stosur	(Belgium) Elise Mertens (Belarus) Aryna Sabalenka	6–7^{(5–7)}, 2–6
Loss	8–8	Sep 2019	Jiangxi International, China	International	Hard	(China) Peng Shuai	(China) Wang Xinyu (China) Zhu Lin	2–6, 6–7^{(5–7)}
Loss	8–9	Jan 2020	Hobart International, Australia	International	Hard	(China) Peng Shuai	(India) Sania Mirza (Ukraine) Nadiia Kichenok	4–6, 4–6
Win	9–9	Aug 2021	Cincinnati Open, US	WTA 1000	Hard	(Australia) Samantha Stosur	(Canada) Gabriela Dabrowski (Brazil) Luisa Stefani	7–5, 6–3
Win	10–9	Sep 2021	US Open, US	Grand Slam	Hard	(Australia) Samantha Stosur	(United States) Coco Gauff (United States) Caty McNally	6–3, 3–6, 6–3
Win	11–9	Sep 2021	Ostrava Open, Czech Republic	WTA 500	Hard (i)	(India) Sania Mirza	(United States) Kaitlyn Christian (New Zealand) Erin Routliffe	6–3, 6–2
Loss	11–10	Oct 2021	Courmayeur Open, Italy	WTA 250	Hard (i)	(Japan) Eri Hozumi	(China) Wang Xinyu (China) Zheng Saisai	4–6, 6–3, [5–10]
Loss	11–11	Apr 2022	Stuttgart Open, Germany	WTA 500	Clay (i)	(United States) Coco Gauff	(United States) Desirae Krawczyk (Netherlands) Demi Schuurs	3–6, 4–6
Win	12–11	Jun 2022	Nottingham Open, UK	WTA 250	Grass	(Brazil) Beatriz Haddad Maia	(United States) Caroline Dolehide (Romania) Monica Niculescu	7–6^{(7–2)}, 6–3
Loss	12–12	Jun 2022	Birmingham Classic, UK	WTA 250	Grass	(Belgium) Elise Mertens	(Ukraine) Lyudmyla Kichenok (Latvia) Jeļena Ostapenko	w/o
Loss	12–13	Jul 2022	Wimbledon, UK	Grand Slam	Grass	(Belgium) Elise Mertens	(Czech Republic) Barbora Krejčíková (Czech Republic) Kateřina Siniaková	2–6, 4–6
Win	13–13	Feb 2023	Abu Dhabi Open, UAE	WTA 500	Hard	(Brazil) Luisa Stefani	(Japan) Shuko Aoyama (Chinese Taipei) Chan Hao-ching	3–6, 6–2, [10–8]
Loss	13–14	Jun 2024	Birmingham Classic, UK	WTA 250	Grass	(Japan) Miyu Kato	(Chinese Taipei) Hsieh Su-wei (Belgium) Elise Mertens	1–6, 3–6
Loss	13–15	Sep 2024	US Open, US	Grand Slam	Hard	(France) Kristina Mladenovic	(Latvia) Jeļena Ostapenko (Ukraine) Lyudmyla Kichenok	4–6, 3–6
Loss	13–16	Sep 2024	Korea Open, South Korea	WTA 500	Hard	(Japan) Miyu Kato	(United States) Nicole Melichar-Martinez; Liudmila Samsonova	1–6, 0–6
Win	14–16	Oct 2024	Guangzhou Open, China	WTA 250	Hard	(Czech Republic) Kateřina Siniaková	(Hungary) Fanny Stollár (Poland) Katarzyna Piter	6–4, 6–1
Loss	14–17	Feb 2025	Abu Dhabi Open, UAE	WTA 500	Hard	(France) Kristina Mladenovic	(Latvia) Jelena Ostapenko (Australia) Ellen Perez	2–6, 1–6
Loss	14–18	Mar 2025	ATX Open, US	WTA 250	Hard	(United States) McCartney Kessler	Anna Blinkova (China) Yuan Yue	6–3, 1–6, [4–10]
Loss	14–19	Apr 2025	Stuttgart Open, Germany	WTA 500	Clay (i)	Ekaterina Alexandrova	(Canada) Gabriela Dabrowski (New Zealand) Erin Routliffe	3–6, 3–6
Win	15–19	Jul 2025	Citi DC Open, US	WTA 500	Hard	(United States) Taylor Townsend	(United States) Caroline Dolehide (United States) Sofia Kenin	6–1, 6–1
Loss	15–20	Aug 2025	Canadian Open, Canada	WTA 1000	Hard	(United States) Taylor Townsend	(United States) Coco Gauff (United States) McCartney Kessler	4–6, 6–1, [11–13]
Win	16–20	Jan 2026	Adelaide International, Australia	WTA 500	Hard	(Czech Republic) Kateřina Siniaková	(Ukraine) Lyudmyla Kichenok (United States) Desirae Krawczyk	6–1, 6–4
Win	17–20	Jan 2026	Australian Open, Australia (2)	Grand Slam	Hard	(Belgium) Elise Mertens	(Kazakhstan) Anna Danilina (Serbia) Aleksandra Krunić	7–6^{(7–4)}, 6–4
Win	18–20	Apr 2026	Linz Open, Austria	WTA 500	Clay (i)	(Romania) Sorana Cîrstea	(Czech Republic) Jesika Malečková (Czech Republic) Miriam Škoch	6–3, 6–2
Loss	18–21	Apr 2026	Stuttgart Grand Prix, Germany	WTA 500	Clay (i)	(Latvia) Jeļena Ostapenko	(United States) Nicole Melichar-Martinez; Liudmila Samsonova	1–6, 1–6
Win	19–21	Aug 2026	Candian Open, Canada (2)	WTA 1000	Hard	(Czech Republic) Kateřina Siniaková	(Italy) Sara Errani (United States) Nicole Melichar-Martinez	6–3, 6–4
Loss	19–22	Oct 2026	China Open, China	WTA 1000	Hard	(Czech Republic) Kateřina Siniaková	(Canada) Gabriela Dabrowski (Brazil) Luisa Stefani	1–6, 2–6

== WTA 125 finals ==
=== Singles: 6 (2 titles, 4 runner-ups) ===
Result	W–L	Date	Tournament	Surface	Opponent	Score
Loss	0–1	Sep 2013	Ningbo International, China	Hard	(Serbia) Bojana Jovanovski	7–6^{(9–7)}, 4–6, 1–6
Win	1–1	Oct 2013	Nanjing Ladies Open, China	Hard	(Japan) Ayumi Morita	6–4, ret.
Loss	1–2	Nov 2016	Hawaii Open, United States	Hard	(United States) Catherine Bellis	4–6, 2–6
Win	2–2	Nov 2017	Hawaii Open, United States	Hard	(South Korea) Jang Su-jeong	0–6, 6–2, 6–3
Loss	2–3	Apr 2019	Kunming Open, China	Clay	(China) Zheng Saisai	4–6, 1–6
Loss	2–4	Dec 2021	Open Angers, France	Hard (i)	(Russia) Vitalia Diatchenko	0–6, 4–6

=== Doubles: 5 (3 titles, 2 runner-ups) ===
Result	W–L	Date	Tournament	Surface	Partner	Opponents	Score
Win	1–0	Sep 2013	Ningbo International, China	Hard	(Chinese Taipei) Chan Yung-jan	(Ukraine) Irina Buryachok (Georgia (country)) Oksana Kalashnikova	6–2, 6–1
Loss	1–1	Nov 2013	Nanjing Ladies Open, China	Hard	(Kazakhstan) Yaroslava Shvedova	(Japan) Misaki Doi (China) Xu Yifan	1–6, 4–6
Win	2–1	Dec 2022	Open Angers, France	Hard (i)	(United States) Alycia Parks	(Czech Republic) Miriam Kolodziejová (Czech Republic) Markéta Vondroušová	6–2, 6–2
Loss	2–2	Jul 2024	Contrexéville Open, France	Clay	(Chinese Taipei) Wu Fang-hsien	(Georgia (country)) Oksana Kalashnikova; Iryna Shymanovich	7–5, 3–6, [7–10]
Win	3–2	Dec 2025	Open de Limoges, France	Hard (i)	(Spain) Cristina Bucșa	(France) Elsa Jacquemot (France) Jessika Ponchet	6–3, 6–1

== ITF Circuit finals ==
=== Singles: 33 (24 titles, 9 runner-ups) ===
Legend
$100,000 tournaments (6–1)
$75,000 tournaments (1–1)
$50,000 tournaments (3–2)
$40,000 tournaments (1–0)
$25,000 tournaments (10–5)
$10,000 tournaments (3–0)

Result	W–L	Date	Tournament	Tier	Surface	Opponent	Score
Win	1–0	Feb 2006	ITF Shenzhen, China	10,000	Hard	(China) Ji Chunmei	6–1, 2–6, 6–1
Win	2–0	Feb 2006	ITF Shenzhen, China	10,000	Hard	(China) Chen Yanchong	6–4, 6–2
Win	3–0	May 2006	ITF Tianjin, China	25,000	Hard	(China) Xie Yanze	6–3, 3–6, 6–0
Loss	3–1	Jun 2006	ITF Changwon, South Korea	25,000	Hard	(China) Chen Yanchong	3–6, 3–6
Loss	3–2	Jul 2006	ITF Chongqing, China	25,000	Hard	(Russia) Elena Chalova	3–6, 6–3, 0–6
Win	4–2	Aug 2006	ITF Nanjing, China	25,000	Hard	(China) Xie Yanze	6–3, 1–6, 6–4
Win	5–2	May 2007	ITF Chengdu, China	25,000	Hard	(China) Ren Jing	6–2, 6–7^{(5)}, 6–0
Win	6–2	May 2007	ITF Chengdu, China	25,000	Hard	(China) Xu Yifan	6–2, 6–3
Win	7–2	Jun 2007	ITF Changsha, China	25,000	Hard	(Russia) Regina Kulikova	6–3, 6–4
Win	8–2	Jun 2007	ITF Guangzhou, China	50,000	Hard	(Russia) Regina Kulikova	6–3, 6–1
Loss	8–3	Jun 2007	ITF Noto, Japan	25,000	Carpet	(Russia) Regina Kulikova	5–7, 1–6
Win	9–3	Jul 2007	ITF Nagoya, Japan	25,000	Hard	(Russia) Regina Kulikova	6–3, 6–1
Loss	9–4	Jul 2007	ITF Miyazaki, Japan	25,000	Carpet	(Japan) Junri Namigata	4–6, 2–6
Win	10–4	Mar 2009	ITF Lyon, France	10,000	Hard	(France) Claire Feuerstein	1–6, 6–1, 6–3
Win	11–4	May 2009	ITF Nagano, Japan	25,000	Carpet	(Austria) Nikola Hofmanova	5–7, 6–2, 6–3
Win	12–4	Jun 2009	ITF Xiamen, China	25,000	Hard	(China) Duan Yingying	6–2, 6–1
Win	13–4	Mar 2010	ITF Hammond, United States	25,000	Hard	(United States) Jamie Hampton	6–2, 6–1
Loss	13–5	Mar 2010	ITF Clearwater, United States	25,000	Hard	(Sweden) Johanna Larsson	6–7^{(4)}, 0–6
Loss	13–6	May 2010	Open Saint-Gaudens, France	50,000	Clay	(Estonia) Kaia Kanepi	2–6, 5–7
Win	14–6	Jun 2010	Maribor Open, Slovenia	50,000	Clay	(Spain) Laura Pous Tió	6–3, 3–6, 6–3
Loss	14–7	Aug 2010	Beijing Challenger, China	75,000	Hard	(Japan) Junri Namigata	6–7^{(3)}, 2–6
Loss	14–8	Sep 2012	Ningbo International, China	100.000	Hard	(Chinese Taipei) Hsieh Su-wei	2–6, 2–6
Loss	14–9	Apr 2013	Dothan Pro Classic, US	50,000	Clay	(Croatia) Ajla Tomljanović	6–2, 4–6, 3–6
Win	15–9	Jul 2013	Beijing Challenger, China	75,000	Hard	(China) Zhou Yimiao	6–2, 6–1
Win	16–9	Nov 2015	Tokyo Open, Japan	100,000	Hard	(Japan) Nao Hibino	6–4, 6–1
Win	17–9	Feb 2016	Rancho Santa Fe Open, US	25,000	Hard	(United States) Vania King	1–6, 7–5, 6–4
Win	18–9	Nov 2016	Tokyo Open, Japan (2)	100,000	Hard	(Hungary) Dalma Gálfi	4–6, 7–6^{(2)}, 6–2
Win	19–9	Jul 2017	President's Cup, Kazakhstan	100,000+H	Hard	(Belgium) Ysaline Bonaventure	6–3, 6–4
Win	20–9	Nov 2017	Tokyo Open, Japan (3)	100,000	Hard	(Romania) Mihaela Buzărnescu	6–4, 6–0
Win	21–9	Nov 2019	Tokyo Open, Japan (4)	100,000	Hard	(Italy) Jasmine Paolini	6–3, 7–5
Win	22–9	Apr 2025	Kangaroo_Cup, Japan	100,000	Hard	(Thailand) Mananchaya Sawangkaew	6–3, 6–4
Win	23–9	Jul 2025	ITF Nottingham, UK	50,000	Hard	(France) Harmony Tan	6–4, 6–2
Win	24–9	Nov 2025	Keio Challenger, Japan	40,000	Hard	(South Korea) Ku Yeon-woo	6–3, 6–2

=== Doubles: 12 (8 titles, 4 runner-ups) ===
Legend
$75,000 tournaments (2–0)
$50,000 tournaments (1–1)
$25,000 tournaments (5–1)
$10,000 tournaments (0–2)

Result	W–L	Date	Tournament	Tier	Surface	Partner	Opponents	Score
Win	1–0	Jul 2006	ITF Chongqing, China	25,000	Hard	(China) Ren Jie	(China) Ji Chunmei (China) Sun Shengnan	6–4, 6–3
Win	2–0	Jul 2006	ITF Chengdu, China	25,000	Hard	(China) Ren Jie	(China) Xia Huan (China) Xu Yifan	6–4, 6–2
Win	3–0	Jul 2007	ITF Miyazaki, Japan	25,000	Carpet	(China) Zhao Yijing	(Japan) Natsumi Hamamura (Japan) Ayaka Maekawa	6–4, 6–4
Loss	3–1	Nov 2007	ITF Taizhou, China	25,000	Hard	(China) Ren Jie	(China) Ji Chunmei (China) Sun Shengnan	6–7^{(5)}, 6–1, [11–13]
Loss	3–2	Feb 2009	ITF Jiangmen, China	10,000	Hard	(China) Xie Yanze	(China) Hao Jie (Chinese Taipei) Kao Shao-yuan	0–6, 5–7
Loss	3–3	Mar 2009	ITF Lyon, France	10,000	Hard	(Turkey) Pemra Özgen	(China) Lu Jingjing (China) Sun Shengnan	4–6, 5–7
Win	4–3	Mar 2009	ITF Tenerife, Spain	25,000	Hard	(China) Sun Shengnan	(Spain) Paula Fondevila Castro (France) Laura Thorpe	6–1, 6–2
Win	5–3	Jun 2009	ITF Komoro, Japan	25,000	Clay	(China) Xu Yifan	(Japan) Ayumi Oka (Thailand) Varatchaya Wongteanchai	6–1, 6–2
Win	6–3	Aug 2010	Beijing Challenger, China	75,000	Hard	(China) Sun Shengnan	(China) Ji Chunmei (China) Liu Wanting	4–6, 6–2, 6–4
Win	7–3	May 2011	Nottingham Trophy, UK	75,000	Grass	(Japan) Kimiko Date-Krumm	(United States) Raquel Kops-Jones (United States) Abigail Spears	6–4, 7–6^{(7)}
Win	8–3	Oct 2011	Grapevine Classic, US	50,000	Hard	(United States) Jamie Hampton	(United States) Lindsay Lee-Waters (United States) Megan Moulton-Levy	6–4, 6–0
Loss	8–4	Jan 2012	Blossom Cup, China	50,000	Hard	(Japan) Kimiko Date-Krumm	(Chinese Taipei) Chan Hao-ching (Japan) Rika Fujiwara	6–4, 4–6, [7–10]

== WTA Tour career earnings ==
Current after the 2022 Cincinnati.

Year	Grand Slam titles (Note: Includes singles, doubles and mixed doubles titles.)	WTA titles	Total titles	Earnings ($)	Money list rank
2011	0	1	1	235,750	82
2012	0	2	2	304,426	100+
2013	0	1	1	304,426	85
2014	0	1	1	425,826	70
2015	0	0	0	173,407	145
2016	0	0	0	1,033,120	32
2017	0	1	1	843,444	43
2018	0	3	3	982,583	39
2019	1	0	1	1,661,425	24
2020	0	0	0	543,404	37
2021	1	2	3	1,020,886	31
2022	0	2	2	1,088,085	24
Career	2	13	15	8,909,447	66

== Career Grand Slam statistics ==
=== Seedings ===
The tournaments won by Zhang are in boldface, and advanced into finals by Zhang are in italics.

==== Singles ====
Year	Australian Open	French Open	Wimbledon	US Open
2007	did not qualify	absent	absent	did not qualify
2008	did not qualify	did not qualify	absent	qualifier
2009	absent	absent	absent	did not qualify
2010	did not qualify	qualifier	did not qualify	did not qualify
2011	not seeded	not seeded	not seeded	not seeded
2012	wildcard	qualifier	did not qualify	did not qualify
2013	absent	absent	absent	did not qualify
2014	not seeded	not seeded	not seeded	32nd
2015	not seeded	not seeded	did not qualify	did not qualify
2016	qualifier	not seeded	not seeded	not seeded
2017	20th	32nd	30th	27th
2018	not seeded	27th	31st	not seeded
2019	not seeded	not seeded	not seeded	33rd
2020	not seeded	not seeded	cancelled	25th
2021	31st	not seeded	not seeded	not seeded
2022	not seeded	not seeded	33rd	not seeded

==== Doubles ====
Year	Australian Open	French Open	Wimbledon	US Open
2010	absent	absent	qualifier	absent
2011	not seeded	not seeded	not seeded	not seeded
2012	not seeded	not seeded	not seeded	not seeded
2013	absent	13th	not seeded	not seeded
2014	not seeded	not seeded	not seeded	absent
2015	not seeded	absent	absent	absent
2016	absent	not seeded	not seeded	not seeded
2017	not seeded	not seeded	not seeded	not seeded
2018	not seeded	absent	not seeded	not seeded
2019	**not seeded (1)**	5th	5th	6th
2020	not seeded	8th	cancelled	5th
2021	10th	8th	not seeded	**14th (2)**
2022	4th	4th	1st (1)	11th

== Wins against top 10 players ==
Season	2009	...	2014	2015	2016	2017	2018	...	2022	2023	2024	Total
Wins	1		1	0	2	1	1		2	0	1	9

No.	Player	Rk	Event	Surface	Rd	Score	Rk	Years	Ref
1.	(Russia) Dinara Safina	1	China Open, China	Hard	2R	7–5, 7–6^{(7–5)}		2009	
2.	(Czech Republic) Petra Kvitová	6	Italian Open, Italy	Clay	2R	7–6^{(8–6)}, 5–7, 6–3		2014	
3.	(Romania) Simona Halep	2	Australian Open, Australia	Hard	1R	6–4, 6–3		2016	
4.	(Romania) Simona Halep	4	China Open, China	Hard	3R	6–0, 6–3		2016	
5.	(Spain) Garbiñe Muguruza	7	Qatar Open, Qatar	Hard	2R	7–6^{(7–3)}, 3–6, 7–5		2017	
6.	(Germany) Angelique Kerber	3	China Open, China	Hard	3R	6–1, 2–6, 6–0		2018	
7.	(Estonia) Anett Kontaveit	2	Cincinnati Open, United States	Hard	3R	2–6, 6–4, 6–4		2022	
8.	(France) Caroline Garcia	10	Pan Pacific Open, Japan	Hard	2R	4–6, 7–6^{(7–5)}, 7–6^{(7–5)}		2022	
9.	(United States) Emma Navarro	8	China Open, China	Hard	2R	6–4, 6–2		2024	

- Key: (Rk) first use, opponent rank; (Rd) round; (Rk) 2nd use, player rank; (Ref) reference; (F) final; (SF) semifinal; (QF) quarterfinal; (#R) rounds 4, 3, 2, 1; (RR) round-robin stage; (Q#) qualifying rounds or stages (3), 2, 1.
