= 2013 WTA 125K series =

Details
- Duration: February 11, 2013 – November 10, 2013
- Edition: 2nd
- Tournaments: 5

Achievements (singles)
- Most titles: (China) Zhang Shuai (2)
- Prize money leader: (China) Zhang Shuai ($40,375)

The WTA 125K series is the secondary professional tennis circuit organised by the Women's Tennis Association. The 2013 WTA 125K series calendar consisted of five tournaments, each with a total prize fund of $125,000. A sixth tournament in Pune was earlier scheduled but cancelled.

== Schedule ==
Week of	Tournament	Champions	Runners-up	Semifinalists	Quarterfinalists
February 11	Copa Bionaire; Cali, Colombia; Clay – $125,000 – 32S/16Q/16D; Singles – Doubles	(Spain) Lara Arruabarrena; 6–3, 6–2	(Colombia) Catalina Castaño	(Ukraine) Elina Svitolina (Argentina) Paula Ormaechea	(Colombia) Mariana Duque (Kazakhstan) Sesil Karatantcheva (Russia) Alexandra Panova (Brazil) Teliana Pereira
February 11	Copa Bionaire; Cali, Colombia; Clay – $125,000 – 32S/16Q/16D; Singles – Doubles	(Colombia) Catalina Castaño (Colombia) Mariana Duque; 3–6, 6–1, [10–5]	(Argentina) Florencia Molinero (Brazil) Teliana Pereira	(Ukraine) Elina Svitolina (Argentina) Paula Ormaechea	(Colombia) Mariana Duque (Kazakhstan) Sesil Karatantcheva (Russia) Alexandra Panova (Brazil) Teliana Pereira
August 5	Suzhou Ladies Open; Suzhou, China; Hard – $125,000 – 32S/16Q/16D; Singles – Doubles	(Israel) Shahar Pe'er; 6–2, 2–6, 6–3	(China) Zheng Saisai	(Hungary) Tímea Babos (Japan) Misaki Doi	(Thailand) Tamarine Tanasugarn (China) Zhou Yimiao (China) Zhang Shuai (Japan) Eri Hozumi
August 5	Suzhou Ladies Open; Suzhou, China; Hard – $125,000 – 32S/16Q/16D; Singles – Doubles	(Hungary) Tímea Babos (Netherlands) Michaëlla Krajicek; 6–2, 6–2	(China) Han Xinyun (Japan) Eri Hozumi	(Hungary) Tímea Babos (Japan) Misaki Doi	(Thailand) Tamarine Tanasugarn (China) Zhou Yimiao (China) Zhang Shuai (Japan) Eri Hozumi
September 23	Ningbo International Women's Tennis Open; Ningbo, China; Hard – $125,000 – 32S/16Q/16D; Singles – Doubles	(Serbia) Bojana Jovanovski; 6–7^{(7–9)}, 6–4, 6–1	(China) Zhang Shuai	(Sweden) Johanna Larsson (Austria) Yvonne Meusburger	(Slovakia) Anna Karolína Schmiedlová (United Kingdom) Johanna Konta (Kazakhstan) Yaroslava Shvedova (Spain) Anabel Medina Garrigues
September 23	Ningbo International Women's Tennis Open; Ningbo, China; Hard – $125,000 – 32S/16Q/16D; Singles – Doubles	(Chinese Taipei) Chan Yung-jan (China) Zhang Shuai; 6–2, 6–1	(Ukraine) Irina Buryachok (Georgia (country)) Oksana Kalashnikova	(Sweden) Johanna Larsson (Austria) Yvonne Meusburger	(Slovakia) Anna Karolína Schmiedlová (United Kingdom) Johanna Konta (Kazakhstan) Yaroslava Shvedova (Spain) Anabel Medina Garrigues
October 28	Nanjing Ladies Open; Nanjing, China; Hard – $125,000 – 32S/16Q/16D; Singles – Doubles	(China) Zhang Shuai; 6–4, retired	(Japan) Ayumi Morita	(Australia) Jarmila Gajdošová (Belgium) Yanina Wickmayer	(China) Wang Qiang (Slovakia) Anna Karolína Schmiedlová (China) Zheng Saisai (Germany) Anna-Lena Friedsam
October 28	Nanjing Ladies Open; Nanjing, China; Hard – $125,000 – 32S/16Q/16D; Singles – Doubles	(Japan) Misaki Doi (China) Xu Yifan; 6–1, 6–4	(Kazakhstan) Yaroslava Shvedova (China) Zhang Shuai	(Australia) Jarmila Gajdošová (Belgium) Yanina Wickmayer	(China) Wang Qiang (Slovakia) Anna Karolína Schmiedlová (China) Zheng Saisai (Germany) Anna-Lena Friedsam
November 4	OEC Taipei WTA Ladies Open; Taipei, Taiwan $125,000 – carpet (indoor) – 32S/16Q/16D; Singles – Doubles	(Belgium) Alison Van Uytvanck; 6–4, 6–2	(Belgium) Yanina Wickmayer	(Germany) Dinah Pfizenmaier (Thailand) Luksika Kumkhum	(Russia) Ekaterina Bychkova (Poland) Katarzyna Piter (Croatia) Petra Martić (China) Zheng Saisai
November 4	OEC Taipei WTA Ladies Open; Taipei, Taiwan $125,000 – carpet (indoor) – 32S/16Q/16D; Singles – Doubles	(France) Caroline Garcia (Kazakhstan) Yaroslava Shvedova; 6–3, 6–3	(Germany) Anna-Lena Friedsam (Belgium) Alison Van Uytvanck	(Germany) Dinah Pfizenmaier (Thailand) Luksika Kumkhum	(Russia) Ekaterina Bychkova (Poland) Katarzyna Piter (Croatia) Petra Martić (China) Zheng Saisai

== Points distribution ==
Points are awarded as follows:

Tournament category	W	F	SF	QF	R16	R32	Q
WTA 125K series	160	117	85	44	22	1	6

== Statistical information ==
These tables present the number of singles (S) and doubles (D) titles won by each player and each nation during the season, within all the tournament categories of the 2013 WTA 125K series. The players/nations are sorted by: 1) total number of titles (a doubles title won by two players representing the same nation counts as only one win for the nation); 2) a singles > doubles hierarchy; 3) alphabetical order (by family names for players).

=== Titles won by player ===
Total	Player	S	D	S	D
2	Zhang Shuai (CHN)	●	●	1	1
1	Lara Arruabarrena (ESP)	●		1	0
1	Bojana Jovanovski (SRB)	●		1	0
1	Shahar Pe'er (ISR)	●		1	0
1	Alison Van Uytvanck (BEL)	●		1	0
1	Tímea Babos (HUN)		●	0	1
1	Catalina Castaño (COL)		●	0	1
1	Chan Yung-jan (TPE)		●	0	1
1	Misaki Doi (JPN)		●	0	1
1	Mariana Duque (COL)		●	0	1
1	Caroline Garcia (FRA)		●	0	1
1	Michaëlla Krajicek (NED)		●	0	1
1	Yaroslava Shvedova (KAZ)		●	0	1
1	Xu Yifan (CHN)		●	0	1

=== Titles won by nation ===
Total	Nation	S	D
3	China (CHN)	1	2
1	Belgium (BEL)	1	0
1	Israel (ISR)	1	0
1	Serbia (SRB)	1	0
1	Spain (ESP)	1	0
1	Colombia (COL)	0	1
1	Chinese Taipei (TPE)	0	1
1	France (FRA)	0	1
1	Hungary (HUN)	0	1
1	Japan (JPN)	0	1
1	Kazakhstan (KAZ)	0	1
1	Netherlands (NED)	0	1
