= 2015 Nanjing Ladies Open =

- Date: 27 October – 1 November
- Edition: 2nd
- Category: ITF Women's Circuit
- Prize money: $100,000
- Surface: Hard
- Location: Nanjing, China

Champions

Singles
- (Chinese Taipei) Hsieh Su-wei

Doubles
- (Japan) Shuko Aoyama / (Japan) Eri Hozumi
← 2013 ·	Nanjing Ladies Open	· 2016 →

The 2015 Nanjing Ladies Open was a professional tennis tournament played on outdoor hard courts. It was the second edition of the tournament and part of the 2015 ITF Women's Circuit, offering a total of $100,000 in prize money. It took place in Nanjing, China, on 27 October to 1 November 2015.

== Singles main draw entrants ==
=== Seeds ===
Country	Player	Rank^{1}	Seed
CHN	Zheng Saisai	75	1
JPN	Nao Hibino	78	2
JPN	Kurumi Nara	83	3
KAZ	Yulia Putintseva	84	4
RUS	Elizaveta Kulichkova	99	5
CHN	Wang Qiang	106	6
CHN	Duan Yingying	114	7
TPE	Hsieh Su-wei	120	8

- ^{1} Rankings as of 19 October 2015.

=== Other entrants ===
The following players received wildcards into the singles main draw:

- (China) Liang Chen
- (China) Wang Yan
- (China) Xu Shilin
- (China) Zheng Saisai

The following players received entry from the qualifying draw:

- (Germany) Carolin Daniels
- (China) Lu Jingjing
- (Croatia) Silvia Njirić
- (China) Tian Ran

== Champions ==
=== Singles ===
- (Chinese Taipei) Hsieh Su-wei def. (Kazakhstan) Yulia Putintseva, 7–6^{(7–5)}, 2–6, 6–2

=== Doubles ===
- (Japan) Shuko Aoyama / (Japan) Eri Hozumi def. (Chinese Taipei) Chan Chin-wei / (China) Zhang Kailin, 7–5, 6–7^{(7–9)}, [10–7]
