= 2013 OEC Taipei WTA Ladies Open =

- Date: 4–10 November
- Edition: 6th
- Category: WTA 125K series
- Prize money: $125,000
- Surface: Carpet (indoor)
- Location: Taipei, Taiwan

Champions

Singles
- (Belgium) Alison Van Uytvanck

Doubles
- (France) Caroline Garcia / (Kazakhstan) Yaroslava Shvedova
- Taipei Open

The 2013 OEC Taipei WTA Ladies Open also known as 2013 OEC Taipei WTA Challenger was a professional tennis tournament played on indoor carpet courts. It was the sixth edition of the tournament and the last event of the 2013 WTA 125K series. It took place in Taipei, Taiwan, on 4–10 November 2013.

== Singles entrants ==
=== Seeds ===
Country	Player	Rank^{1}	Seed
JPN	Kimiko Date-Krumm	52	1
BEL	Yanina Wickmayer	60	2
CHN	Zhang Shuai	62	3
JPN	Ayumi Morita	63	4
JPN	Kurumi Nara	70	5
FRA	Caroline Garcia	72	6
JPN	Misaki Doi	78	7
CRO	Ajla Tomljanović	79	8

- ^{1} Rankings as of 28 October 2013

=== Other entrants ===
The following players received wildcards into the singles main draw:

- (Chinese Taipei) Chan Yung-jan
- (Chinese Taipei) Chan Hao-ching
- (Chinese Taipei) Lee Ya-hsuan
- (China) Wang Qiang

The following players received entry from the qualifying draw:

- (Russia) Ekaterina Bychkova
- (Chinese Taipei) Chan Chin-wei
- (Netherlands) Lesley Kerkhove
- (Russia) Valeria Solovyeva

== Doubles entrants ==
=== Seeds ===
Country	Player	Country	Player	Rank	Seed
JPN	Kimiko Date-Krumm	CHN	Zhang Shuai	98	1
TPE	Chan Hao-ching	TPE	Chan Yung-jan	124	2
CRO	Petra Martić	CHN	Zheng Saisai	130	3
UKR	Irina Buryachok	POL	Katarzyna Piter	148	4

=== Other entrants ===
The following pair received entry as alternates:

- (Germany) Anna-Lena Friedsam / (Belgium) Alison Van Uytvanck

=== Withdrawals ===
Before the tournament

- (Croatia) Ajla Tomljanović (lower back injury)

== Champions ==
=== Singles ===
- (Belgium) Alison Van Uytvanck def. (Belgium) Yanina Wickmayer 6–4, 6–2

=== Doubles ===
- (France) Caroline Garcia / (Kazakhstan) Yaroslava Shvedova def. (Germany) Anna-Lena Friedsam / (Belgium) Alison Van Uytvanck 6–3, 6–3
