= 2013 Nanjing Ladies Open =

- Date: 28 October–3 November
- Edition: 1st
- Category: WTA 125K series
- Prize money: $125,000
- Surface: Hard
- Location: Nanjing, China

Champions

Singles
- (China) Zhang Shuai

Doubles
- (Japan) Misaki Doi / (China) Xu Yifan
| Nanjing Ladies Open | · 2014 → |

The 2013 Nanjing Ladies Open was a professional tennis tournament played on outdoor hard courts. It was the inaugural edition of the tournament and was part of the 2013 WTA 125K series. It took place in Nanjing, China, on 28 October–3 November 2013.

== Singles draw entrants ==
=== Seeds ===
| Country | Player | Rank^{1} | Seed |
|---|---|---|---|
| JPN | Kimiko Date-Krumm | 55 | 1 |
| BEL | Yanina Wickmayer | 60 | 2 |
| CHN | Zhang Shuai | 61 | 3 |
| JPN | Ayumi Morita | 62 | 4 |
| FRA | Caroline Garcia | 72 | 5 |
| JPN | Misaki Doi | 78 | 6 |
| CRO | Ajla Tomljanović | 79 | 7 |
| SVK | Anna Karolina Schmiedlova | 81 | 8 |

- ^{1} Rankings as of 21 October 2013

=== Other entrants ===
The following players received wildcards into the singles main draw:

- (China) Wang Qiang
- (China) Zhang Yuxuan
- (China) Wang Yafan
- (China) Sun Ziyue

The following players received entry from the qualifying draw:

- (Croatia) Tereza Mrdeža
- (Australia) Jarmila Gajdošová
- (China) Xu Yifan
- (Thailand) Nicha Lertpitaksinchai

The following player received entry into the singles main draw as a lucky loser:

- (Thailand) Peangtarn Plipuech

== Doubles draw entrants ==
=== Seeds ===
| Country | Player | Country | Player | Rank | Seed |
|---|---|---|---|---|---|
| KAZ | Yaroslava Shvedova | CHN | Zhang Shuai | 122 | 1 |
| CRO | Petra Martić | CHN | Zheng Saisai | 130 | 2 |
| UKR | Irina Buryachok | POL | Katarzyna Piter | 149 | 3 |
| ROU | Irina-Camelia Begu | BEL | Yanina Wickmayer | 190 | 4 |

== Champions ==
=== Singles ===
- (China) Zhang Shuai def. (Japan) Ayumi Morita 6–4, retired

=== Doubles ===
- (Japan) Misaki Doi / (China) Xu Yifan def. (Kazakhstan) Yaroslava Shvedova / (China) Zhang Shuai 6–1, 6–4
