= 2013 Ningbo International Women's Tennis Open =

- Date: 22–27 September
- Edition: 4th
- Category: WTA 125K series
- Draw: 32S/16D
- Prize money: $125,000
- Surface: Hard / outdoor
- Location: Ningbo, China

Champions

Singles
- (Serbia) Bojana Jovanovski

Doubles
- (Chinese Taipei) Chan Yung-jan / (China) Zhang Shuai
- Ningbo International Women's Tennis Open

The 2013 Yinzhou Bank International Women's Tennis Open was a professional tennis tournament played on hard courts. It was the fourth edition of the tournament which was part of the 2013 WTA 125K series. It took place in Ningbo, China, from 22 September until 27 September 2013. First-seeded Bojana Jovanovski won the singles title.

== Women's singles entrants ==
=== Seeds ===
Country	Player	Rank^{1}	Seed
SRB	Bojana Jovanovski	41	1
CHN	Zheng Jie	58	2
ESP	Lourdes Domínguez Lino	60	3
AUT	Yvonne Meusburger	64	4
UKR	Lesia Tsurenko	68	5
CZE	Karolína Plíšková	70	6
KAZ	Yaroslava Shvedova	74	7
USA	Lauren Davis	75	8

- ^{1} Rankings as of 16 September 2013

=== Other entrants ===
The following players received wildcards into the singles main draw:

- (China) Han Xinyun
- (China) Wang Qiang
- (China) Zhang Yuxuan
- (China) Zheng Saisai

The following players received entry from the qualifying draw:

- (Czech Republic) Petra Cetkovská
- (Netherlands) Richèl Hogenkamp
- (Poland) Katarzyna Piter
- (China) Wang Yafan

== Women's doubles entrants ==
=== Seeds ===
Country	Player	Country	Player	Rank	Seed
RUS	Vera Dushevina	CRO	Darija Jurak	84	1
HUN	Tímea Babos	POL	Alicja Rosolska	90	2
ROU	Irina-Camelia Begu	SVK	Janette Husárová	111	3
UKR	Irina Buryachok	GEO	Oksana Kalashnikova	127	4

=== Other entrants ===
The following players received wildcards into the doubles draw:

- (China) Sun Xuliu / (China) Zheng Wushuang

== Champions ==
=== Singles ===
- (Serbia) Bojana Jovanovski def. (China) Shuai Zhang 6–7^{(7–9)}, 6–4, 6–1

=== Doubles ===
- (Chinese Taipei) Chan Yung-jan / (China) Zhang Shuai def. (Ukraine) Irina Buryachok / (Georgia (country)) Oksana Kalashnikova 6–2, 6–1
