= 2015 Nanjing Ladies Open – Singles =

Singles
- 2015 Nanjing Ladies Open

Final
- Champion: (Chinese Taipei) Hsieh Su-wei
- Runner-up: (Kazakhstan) Yulia Putintseva
- Score: 7–6^{(7–5)}, 2–6, 6–2

Events
Singles	Doubles
← 2014 ·	Nanjing Ladies Open	· 2016 →

Zhang Shuai was the defending champion of 2013, as this tournament was not held in 2014, however she lost in the second round to Tian Ran.

Hsieh Su-wei won the title, defeating Yulia Putintseva in the final, 7–6^{(7–5)}, 2–6, 6–2.

== Seeds ==
1. (China) Zheng Saisai (first round)
2. (Japan) Nao Hibino (first round)
3. (Japan) Kurumi Nara (second round)
4. (Kazakhstan) Yulia Putintseva (final)
5. (Russia) Elizaveta Kulichkova (second round)
6. (China) Wang Qiang (first round)
7. (China) Duan Yingying (first round)
8. (Chinese Taipei) Hsieh Su-wei (champion)

== Draw ==
=== Key ===
- Q = Qualifier
- WC = Wild card
- LL = Lucky loser
- Alt = Alternate
- SE = Special exempt
- PR = Protected ranking
- ITF = ITF entry
- JE = Junior exempt
- w/o = Walkover
- r = Retired
- d = Defaulted
- SR = Special ranking

=== Finals ===
Semifinals
8	(Chinese Taipei) Hsieh Su-wei	6	6^{3}	6
(China) Zhang Kailin	0	7^{7}	2
4	(Kazakhstan) Yulia Putintseva	6	6
WC	(China) Xu Shilin	1	1

Final
8	(Chinese Taipei) Hsieh Su-wei	7^{7}	2	6
4	(Kazakhstan) Yulia Putintseva	6^{5}	6	2

=== Top half ===
First round
1/WC	(China) S Zheng	3	7^{8}	4
Q	(China) R Tian	6	6^{6}	6
(South Korea) S-r Lee	3	0
(China) S Zhang	6	6
(China) Yaf Wang	6	6
Q	(Germany) C Daniels	4	1
(Japan) E Hozumi	1	2
8	(Chinese Taipei) S-w Hsieh	6	6
3	(Japan) K Nara	6	6
WC	(China) C Liang	3	3
(China) K Zhang	6	7
(Hong Kong) L Zhang	2	5
(China) F Liu	5	6^{7}
Q	(China) J Lu	7	7^{9}
(China) Z Yang	6	7
7	(China) Y Duan	3	5

Second round
Q	(China) R Tian	3	6	6
(China) S Zhang	6	4	2
(China) Yaf Wang	7	1	4
8	(Chinese Taipei) S-w Hsieh	5	6	6
3	(Japan) K Nara	6	2	1
(China) K Zhang	1	6	6
Q	(China) J Lu	6	7
(China) Z Yang	1	5

Quarterfinals
Q	(China) R Tian	3	0
8	(Chinese Taipei) S-w Hsieh	6	6
(China) K Zhang	6	6
Q	(China) J Lu	3	4

Semifinals
8	(Chinese Taipei) S-w Hsieh	6	6^{3}	6
(China) K Zhang	0	7^{7}	2

=== Bottom half ===
First round
5	(Russia) E Kulichkova	6	6
(Thailand) L Kumkhum	1	1
(Slovakia) K Kučová	5	7^{7}	6
(Russia) E Bychkova	7	6^{1}	3
(China) Y Zhang	6	4	3
(Russia) A Komardina	3	6	6
(Japan) S Aoyama	4	1
4	(Kazakhstan) Y Putintseva	6	6
6	(China) Q Wang	1	2
(China) Y Xu	6	6
WC	(China) S Xu	7^{7}	6
Q	(Croatia) S Njirić	6^{3}	4
WC	(China) Yan Wang	1	0
(China) X Han	6	6
(China) C Liu	7^{8}	6
2	(Japan) N Hibino	6^{6}	3

Second round
5	(Russia) E Kulichkova	6	4	3
(Slovakia) K Kučová	2	6	6
(Russia) A Komardina	2	4
4	(Kazakhstan) Y Putintseva	6	6
(China) Y Xu	4	2
WC	(China) S Xu	6	6
(China) X Han	7	6
(China) C Liu	5	3

Quarterfinals
(Slovakia) K Kučová	4	5
4	(Kazakhstan) Y Putintseva	6	7
WC	(China) S Xu	7	6
(China) X Han	5	1

Semifinals
4	(Kazakhstan) Y Putintseva	6	6
WC	(China) S Xu	1	1
