= 2013 OEC Taipei WTA Ladies Open – Doubles =

Doubles
- 2013 OEC Taipei WTA Ladies Open

Final
- Champions: (France) Caroline Garcia (Kazakhstan) Yaroslava Shvedova
- Runners-up: (Germany) Anna-Lena Friedsam (Belgium) Alison Van Uytvanck
- Score: 6–3, 6–3

Events
Singles	Doubles
- OEC Taipei WTA Ladies Open

Chan Hao-ching and Kristina Mladenovic were the defending champions, but Mladenovic decided not to participate. Chan played alongside Chan Yung-jan but lost in the first round to Anna-Lena Friedsam and Alison Van Uytvanck.

Caroline Garcia and Yaroslava Shvedova won the tournament, defeating Friedsam and Van Uytvanck in the final, 6–3, 6–3.

== Seeds ==
1. (Japan) Kimiko Date-Krumm / (China) Zhang Shuai (first round)
2. (Chinese Taipei) Chan Hao-ching / (Chinese Taipei) Chan Yung-jan (first round)
3. (Croatia) Petra Martić / (China) Zheng Saisai (semifinals)
4. (Ukraine) Irina Buryachok / (Poland) Katarzyna Piter (quarterfinals)

== Draw ==
Key

- Q = Qualifier
- WC = Wild card
- LL = Lucky loser
- Alt = Alternate
- ITF = ITF entry
- PR = Protected ranking
- SR = Special ranking
- SE = Special exempt
- JE = Junior exempt
- JR = Junior Accelerator Programme entrant
- CO = College Accelerator Programme entrant
- NG = Next Gen Accelerator Program entrant
- w/o = Walkover
- r = Retired
- d = Defaulted

First round
1	(Japan) K Date-Krumm (China) S Zhang	4	6	[8]
(Japan) M Doi (Chinese Taipei) S-y Hsieh	6	4	[10]
(Russia) E Bychkova (Russia) D Gavrilova	4	4
(France) C Garcia (Kazakhstan) Y Shvedova	6	6
3	(Croatia) P Martić (China) S Zheng	6	7
(Poland) P Kania (Russia) V Solovyeva	4	5
(Canada) S Dubois (Germany) D Pfizenmaier	2	3
(Chinese Taipei) C-w Chan (China) Y Xu	6	6
(Ukraine) O Savchuk (Thailand) T Tanasugarn	6	6
(Chinese Taipei) W-h Hsu (Chinese Taipei) Y-h Lee	0	2
(Netherlands) L Kerkhove (Netherlands) A Rus	6^{3}	7	[3]
4	(Ukraine) I Buryachok (Poland) K Piter	7^{7}	5	[10]
(Chinese Taipei) C-j Chuang (Belarus) O Govortsova	2	3
(China) X Han (Thailand) L Kumkhum	6	6
Alt	(Germany) A-L Friedsam (Belgium) A Van Uytvanck	6	6
2	(Chinese Taipei) H-c Chan (Chinese Taipei) Y-j Chan	2	4

Quarterfinals
(Japan) M Doi (Chinese Taipei) S-y Hsieh	3	6	[9]
(France) C Garcia (Kazakhstan) Y Shvedova	6	3	[11]
3	(Croatia) P Martić (China) S Zheng	6	6
(Chinese Taipei) C-w Chan (China) Y Xu	4	4
(Ukraine) O Savchuk (Thailand) T Tanasugarn	6	6
4	(Ukraine) I Buryachok (Poland) K Piter	3	3
(China) X Han (Thailand) L Kumkhum	2	6	[8]
Alt	(Germany) A-L Friedsam (Belgium) A Van Uytvanck	6	2	[10]

Semifinals
(France) C Garcia (Kazakhstan) Y Shvedova	7	7^{7}
3	(Croatia) P Martić (China) S Zheng	5	6^{4}
(Ukraine) O Savchuk (Thailand) T Tanasugarn	6	6^{4}	[7]
Alt	(Germany) A-L Friedsam (Belgium) A Van Uytvanck	2	7^{7}	[10]

Final
(France) C Garcia (Kazakhstan) Y Shvedova	6	6
Alt	(Germany) A-L Friedsam (Belgium) A Van Uytvanck	3	3
