= 2015 Nanjing Ladies Open – Doubles =

Doubles
- 2015 Nanjing Ladies Open

Final
- Champions: (Japan) Shuko Aoyama (Japan) Eri Hozumi
- Runners-up: (Chinese Taipei) Chan Chin-wei (China) Zhang Kailin
- Score: 7–5, 6–7^{(7–9)}, [10–7]

Events
Singles	Doubles
← 2014 ·	Nanjing Ladies Open	· 2016 →

Misaki Doi and Xu Yifan were the defending champions of 2013, the tournament was not held in 2014. Doi chose not to participate. Xu partnered Wang Yafan, but lost in the quarterfinals to Yang Zhaoxuan and Zhang Yuxuan.

Japanese-duo Shuko Aoyama and Eri Hozumi won the title, defeating Chan Chin-wei and Zhang Kailin in the final, 7–5, 6–7^{(7–9)}, [10–7].

== Seeds ==
1. (China) Wang Yafan / (China) Xu Yifan (quarterfinals)
2. (Japan) Shuko Aoyama / (Japan) Eri Hozumi (champions)
3. (Chinese Taipei) Chan Chin-wei / (China) Zhang Kailin (final)
4. (Germany) Carolin Daniels / (Belarus) Lidziya Marozava (semifinals)

== Draw ==
=== Key ===
- Q = Qualifier
- WC = Wild card
- LL = Lucky loser
- Alt = Alternate
- SE = Special exempt
- PR = Protected ranking
- ITF = ITF entry
- JE = Junior exempt
- w/o = Walkover
- r = Retired
- d = Defaulted
- SR = Special ranking

=== Draw ===
First round
1	(China) Yaf Wang (China) Y Xu	6	2	[10]
(Russia) K Lykina (United Kingdom) E Webley-Smith	1	6	[7]
(China) Z Yang (China) Yu Zhang	6	7
(Japan) N Hibino (South Korea) S-r Lee	2	5
3	(Chinese Taipei) C-w Chan (China) K Zhang	6	6
(Belgium) E Boeykens (Russia) E Bychkova	4	4
(China) C Liu (Hong Kong) L Zhang	6	6
WC	(China) J Chen (China) R Tian	0	3
WC	(China) J Lu (China) S Zhang	6	4	[10]
(China) S Xu (China) X You	3	6	[6]
WC	(China) F Xun (China) Yi Zhang	2	4
4	(Germany) C Daniels (Belarus) L Marozava	6	6
(China) X Han (Thailand) L Kumkhum	w/o
(Slovakia) K Kučová (Slovakia) C Škamlová
(Russia) A Komardina (Croatia) S Njirić	4	3
2	(Japan) S Aoyama (Japan) E Hozumi	6	6

Quarterfinals
1	(China) Yaf Wang (China) Y Xu	6	6	[8]
(China) Z Yang (China) Yu Zhang	7	4	[10]
3	(Chinese Taipei) C-w Chan (China) K Zhang	6	6
(China) C Liu (Hong Kong) L Zhang	3	1
WC	(China) J Lu (China) S Zhang	4	6^{6}
4	(Germany) C Daniels (Belarus) L Marozava	6	7^{8}
(China) X Han (Thailand) L Kumkhum	6	4	[8]
2	(Japan) S Aoyama (Japan) E Hozumi	4	6	[10]

Semifinals
(China) Z Yang (China) Yu Zhang	6	3	[5]
3	(Chinese Taipei) C-w Chan (China) K Zhang	3	6	[10]
4	(Germany) C Daniels (Belarus) L Marozava	2	7	[1]
2	(Japan) S Aoyama (Japan) E Hozumi	6	5	[10]

Final
3	(Chinese Taipei) C-w Chan (China) K Zhang	5	7^{9}	[7]
2	(Japan) S Aoyama (Japan) E Hozumi	7	6^{7}	[10]
