= 2013 OEC Taipei WTA Ladies Open – Singles =

Singles
- 2013 OEC Taipei WTA Ladies Open

Final
- Champion: (Belgium) Alison Van Uytvanck
- Runner-up: (Belgium) Yanina Wickmayer
- Score: 6–4, 6–2

Events
Singles	Doubles
- OEC Taipei WTA Ladies Open

Kristina Mladenovic was the defending champion, but decided not to participate.

Alison Van Uytvanck won the tournament, defeating fellow Belgian Yanina Wickmayer in the final, 6–4, 6–2.

== Seeds ==
1. (Japan) Kimiko Date-Krumm (first round)
2. (Belgium) Yanina Wickmayer (final)
3. (China) Zhang Shuai (first round)
4. (Japan) Ayumi Morita (first round)
5. (Japan) Kurumi Nara (first round)
6. (France) Caroline Garcia (first round)
7. (Japan) Misaki Doi (second round)
8. (Croatia) Ajla Tomljanović (first round)

== Main draw ==
Key

- Q = Qualifier
- WC = Wild card
- LL = Lucky loser
- Alt = Alternate
- ITF = ITF entry
- PR = Protected ranking
- SR = Special ranking
- SE = Special exempt
- JE = Junior exempt
- JR = Junior Accelerator Programme entrant
- CO = College Accelerator Programme entrant
- NG = Next Gen Accelerator Program entrant
- w/o = Walkover
- r = Retired
- d = Defaulted

=== Finals ===
Semifinals
(Belgium) Alison Van Uytvanck	7^{7}	6
(Germany) Dinah Pfizenmaier	6^{5}	3
(Thailand) Luksika Kumkhum	3	1
2	(Belgium) Yanina Wickmayer	6	6

Final
(Belgium) Alison Van Uytvanck	6	6
2	(Belgium) Yanina Wickmayer	4	2

=== Top half ===
First round
1	(Japan) K Date-Krumm	2	6	4
Q	(Russia) V Solovyeva	6	2	6
Q	(Russia) E Bychkova	6	7
WC	(Chinese Taipei) Y-j Chan	1	5
(Belgium) A Van Uytvanck	6	6
(Russia) O Puchkova	1	3
(Russia) A Kudryavtseva	6	3	7^{7}
8	(Croatia) A Tomljanović	1	6	6^{2}
3	(China) S Zhang	4	0^{r}
(Poland) K Piter	6	1
(Russia) D Gavrilova	7^{7}	7^{7}
(Russia) V Dushevina	6^{2}	6^{3}
(Canada) S Dubois	7^{9}	3	4
(Germany) D Pfizenmaier	6^{7}	6	6
(Israel) J Glushko	2	0
7	(Japan) M Doi	6	6

Second round
Q	(Russia) V Solovyeva	4	6^{7}
Q	(Russia) E Bychkova	6	7^{9}
(Belgium) A Van Uytvanck	6	6
(Russia) A Kudryavtseva	2	4
(Poland) K Piter	6
(Russia) D Gavrilova	6^{r}
(Germany) D Pfizenmaier	6	5	6
7	(Japan) M Doi	4	7	0

Quarterfinals
Q	(Russia) E Bychkova	3	7^{7}	5
(Belgium) A Van Uytvanck	6	6^{2}	7
(Poland) K Piter	6	3	2
(Germany) D Pfizenmaier	3	6	6

Semifinals
(Belgium) A Van Uytvanck	7^{7}	6
(Germany) D Pfizenmaier	6^{5}	3

=== Bottom half ===
First round
5	(Japan) K Nara	3	5
(Germany) A-L Friedsam	6	7
(Croatia) P Martić	6	6
Q	(Netherlands) L Kerkhove	2	4
(Thailand) L Kumkhum	6	6
WC	(Chinese Taipei) Y-h Lee	0	3
(Kazakhstan) Y Shvedova	3	7^{7}	6
4	(Japan) A Morita	6	6^{3}	3
6	(France) C Garcia	7^{7}	1	5
(Slovakia) AK Schmiedlová	6^{1}	6	7
(China) S Zheng	6	6
WC	(Chinese Taipei) H-c Chan	3	1
(Belarus) O Govortsova	6	5	7
WC	(China) Q Wang	4	7	5
Q	(Chinese Taipei) C-w Chan	6^{3}	4
2	(Belgium) Y Wickmayer	7^{7}	6

Second round
(Germany) A-L Friedsam	4	0
(Croatia) P Martić	6	6
(Thailand) L Kumkhum	7^{7}	4	6
(Kazakhstan) Y Shvedova	6^{4}	6	3
(Slovakia) AK Schmiedlová	3	6	3
(China) S Zheng	6	3	6
(Belarus) O Govortsova	3	4
2	(Belgium) Y Wickmayer	6	6

Quarterfinals
(Croatia) P Martić	6	1	4
(Thailand) L Kumkhum	3	6	6
(China) S Zheng	3	1
2	(Belgium) Y Wickmayer	6	6

Semifinals
(Thailand) L Kumkhum	3	1
2	(Belgium) Y Wickmayer	6	6
