= 2013 Nanjing Ladies Open – Doubles =

Doubles
- 2013 Nanjing Ladies Open

Final
- Champions: (Japan) Misaki Doi (China) Xu Yifan
- Runners-up: (Kazakhstan) Yaroslava Shvedova (China) Zhang Shuai
- Score: 6–1, 6–4

Events
| Singles | Doubles |
| Nanjing Ladies Open | · 2014 → |

This was a new event of the WTA 125K series.

Misaki Doi and Xu Yifan won the tournament, defeating Yaroslava Shvedova and Zhang Shuai in the final, 6–1, 6–4.

== Seeds ==
1. (Kazakhstan) Yaroslava Shvedova / (China) Zhang Shuai (final)
2. (Croatia) Petra Martić / (China) Zheng Saisai (semifinals)
3. (Ukraine) Irina Buryachok / (Poland) Katarzyna Piter (first round)
4. (Romania) Irina-Camelia Begu / (Belgium) Yanina Wickmayer (first round)

== Draw ==
=== Key ===
- Q = Qualifier
- WC = Wild card
- LL = Lucky loser
- Alt = Alternate
- SE = Special exempt
- PR = Protected ranking
- ITF = ITF entry
- JE = Junior exempt
- w/o = Walkover
- r = Retired
- d = Defaulted
- SR = Special ranking

First round
1 | (Kazakhstan) Y Shvedova (China) S Zhang | 6 | 6
(Canada) S Dubois (China) X Han | 3 | 1
(Croatia) T Mrdeža (Slovakia) AK Schmiedlová | 3 | 4
(Thailand) N Lertpitaksinchai (Thailand) P Plipuech | 6 | 6
3 | (Ukraine) I Buryachok (Poland) K Piter | 4 | 3
(Israel) J Glushko (Ukraine) O Savchuk | 6 | 6
(China) C Liu (China) R Tian | 6 | 4 | [10]
(China) J Chen (China) Z Sun | 4 | 6 | [8]
(Australia) J Gajdošová (Russia) D Gavrilova | 5 | 7^{7} | [3]
(China) C Liang (China) S Sun | 7 | 6^{5} | [10]
(Japan) M Doi (China) Y Xu | 7^{7} | 6
4 | (Romania) I-C Begu (Belgium) Y Wickmayer | 6^{5} | 2
(China) H Tang (China) X Yang | 6 | 4 | [10]
(China) Y Wang (China) Y Zhang | 3 | 6 | [12]
(Germany) A-L Friedsam (Japan) R Ozaki | 2 | 3
2 | (Croatia) P Martić (China) S Zheng | 6 | 6

Quarterfinals
1 | (Kazakhstan) Y Shvedova (China) S Zhang | 6 | 6
(Thailand) N Lertpitaksinchai (Thailand) P Plipuech | 2 | 2
(Israel) J Glushko (Ukraine) O Savchuk | 6 | 7
(China) C Liu (China) R Tian | 0 | 5
(China) C Liang (China) S Sun | 3 | 1
(Japan) M Doi (China) Y Xu | 6 | 6
(China) Y Wang (China) Y Zhang | 5 | 2
2 | (Croatia) P Martić (China) S Zheng | 7 | 6

Semifinals
1 | (Kazakhstan) Y Shvedova (China) S Zhang | 6 | 6
(Israel) J Glushko (Ukraine) O Savchuk | 4 | 4
(Japan) M Doi (China) Y Xu | 6 | 6
2 | (Croatia) P Martić (China) S Zheng | 2 | 4

Final
1 | (Kazakhstan) Y Shvedova (China) S Zhang | 1 | 4
(Japan) M Doi (China) Y Xu | 6 | 6
