= 2013 French Open – Women's doubles =

Tennis tournament

Women's doubles
- 2013 French Open

Final
- Champions: (Russia) Ekaterina Makarova (Russia) Elena Vesnina
- Runners-up: (Italy) Sara Errani (Italy) Roberta Vinci
- Score: 7–5, 6–2

Details
- Draw: 64 (7 WC )
- Seeds: 16

Events
Singles	men	women		boys	girls
Doubles	men	women	mixed	boys	girls
WC Singles	men	women	quad
WC Doubles	men	women	quad
Legends	−45	45+	women
← 2012 ·	French Open	· 2014 →

Sara Errani and Roberta Vinci were the defending champions, but lost in the final to Ekaterina Makarova and Elena Vesnina 5–7, 2–6.

== Seeds ==
1. (Italy) Sara Errani / (Italy) Roberta Vinci (final)
2. (Czech Republic) Andrea Hlaváčková / (Czech Republic) Lucie Hradecká (semifinals)
3. (Russia) Nadia Petrova / (Slovenia) Katarina Srebotnik (semifinals)
4. (Russia) Ekaterina Makarova / (Russia) Elena Vesnina (champions)
5. (United States) Liezel Huber / (Spain) María José Martínez Sánchez (first round)
6. (United States) Raquel Kops-Jones / (United States) Abigail Spears (first round)
7. (United States) Bethanie Mattek-Sands / (India) Sania Mirza (third round, retired because of Mattek-Sands' groin injury)
8. (Chinese Taipei) Hsieh Su-wei / (China) Peng Shuai (second round)
9. (Germany) Anna-Lena Grönefeld / (Czech Republic) Květa Peschke (second round)
10. (France) Kristina Mladenovic / (Kazakhstan) Galina Voskoboeva (quarterfinals)
11. (Russia) Anastasia Pavlyuchenkova / (Czech Republic) Lucie Šafářová (quarterfinals)
12. (United States) Serena Williams / (United States) Venus Williams (withdrew)
13. (China) Zhang Shuai / (China) Zheng Jie (third round)
14. (Australia) Ashleigh Barty / (Australia) Casey Dellacqua (first round)
15. (Chinese Taipei) Chan Hao-ching / (Croatia) Darija Jurak (second round)
16. (Slovakia) Daniela Hantuchová / (Spain) Anabel Medina Garrigues (first round)

== Main draw ==
=== Key ===
- Q = Qualifier
- WC = Wild card
- LL = Lucky loser
- Alt = Alternate
- SE = Special exempt
- PR = Protected ranking
- ITF = ITF entry
- JE = Junior exempt
- w/o = Walkover
- r = Retired
- d = Defaulted
- SR = Special ranking

=== Finals ===
Quarterfinals
1	(Italy) Sara Errani (Italy) Roberta Vinci	7	6
(United States) Varvara Lepchenko (China) Zheng Saisai	5	1
3	(Russia) Nadia Petrova (Slovenia) Katarina Srebotnik	6	6
11	(Russia) Anastasia Pavlyuchenkova (Czech Republic) Lucie Šafářová	3	3
10	(France) Kristina Mladenovic (Kazakhstan) Galina Voskoboeva	4	1
4	(Russia) Ekaterina Makarova (Russia) Elena Vesnina	6	6
(Zimbabwe) Cara Black (New Zealand) Marina Erakovic	6	6^{3}	4
2	(Czech Republic) Andrea Hlaváčková (Czech Republic) Lucie Hradecká	2	7^{7}	6

Semifinals
1	(Italy) Sara Errani (Italy) Roberta Vinci	6	5	6
3	(Russia) Nadia Petrova (Slovenia) Katarina Srebotnik	3	7	3
4	(Russia) Ekaterina Makarova (Russia) Elena Vesnina	6	7
2	(Czech Republic) Andrea Hlaváčková (Czech Republic) Lucie Hradecká	4	5

Final
1	(Italy) Sara Errani (Italy) Roberta Vinci	5	2
4	(Russia) Ekaterina Makarova (Russia) Elena Vesnina	7	6

=== Top half ===
==== Section 1 ====
First round
1	(Italy) S Errani (Italy) R Vinci	6	3	6
(Spain) L Domínguez Lino (Spain) G Muguruza	3	6	2
(United States) J Craybas (Switzerland) R Oprandi	5	4
WC	(France) J Coin (France) P Parmentier	7	6
(Czech Republic) E Hrdinová (Serbia) B Jovanovski	6	1	4
(Slovakia) J Husárová (Germany) S Lisicki	4	6	6
(Spain) S Soler Espinosa (Spain) C Suárez Navarro	1	3
15	(Chinese Taipei) H-c Chan (Croatia) D Jurak	6	6
12/WC	(United States) S Williams (United States) V Williams
(Russia) A Kudryavtseva (Australia) A Rodionova	w/o
(Colombia) C Castaño (Hungary) K Marosi	1	6	7^{7}
(Czech Republic) R Voráčová (Czech Republic) K Zakopalová	6	3	6^{5}
(Sweden) S Arvidsson (Sweden) J Larsson	1	6^{3}
(United States) V Lepchenko (China) S Zheng	6	7^{7}
(Romania) I-C Begu (Slovakia) M Rybáriková	1	6	7
6	(United States) R Kops-Jones (United States) A Spears	6	2	5

Second round
1	(Italy) S Errani (Italy) R Vinci	6	6
WC	(France) J Coin (France) P Parmentier	0	1
(Slovakia) J Husárová (Germany) S Lisicki	6	5	6
15	(Chinese Taipei) H-c Chan (Croatia) D Jurak	0	7	1
(Russia) A Kudryavtseva (Australia) A Rodionova	6	6
(Colombia) C Castaño (Hungary) K Marosi	1	1
(United States) V Lepchenko (China) S Zheng	3	7^{11}	6
(Romania) I-C Begu (Slovakia) M Rybáriková	6	6^{9}	3

Third round
1	(Italy) S Errani (Italy) R Vinci	6	6
(Slovakia) J Husárová (Germany) S Lisicki	3	1
(Russia) A Kudryavtseva (Australia) A Rodionova	6^{3}	3
(United States) V Lepchenko (China) S Zheng	7^{7}	6

Quarterfinals
1	(Italy) S Errani (Italy) R Vinci	7	6
(United States) V Lepchenko (China) S Zheng	5	1

==== Section 2 ====
First round
3	(Russia) N Petrova (Slovenia) K Srebotnik	6	6
(South Africa) N Grandin (Czech Republic) V Uhlířová	3	0
WC	(France) S Foretz Gacon (France) I Pavlovic	3	4
(Belarus) O Govortsova (Georgia (country)) A Tatishvili	6	6
(Czech Republic) E Birnerová (Switzerland) S Vögele	6	5	2
(United States) V King (Romania) M Niculescu	2	7	6
(Germany) M Barthel (Latvia) L Dekmeijere	3	6	6
14	(Australia) A Barty (Australia) C Dellacqua	6	4	3
11	(Russia) A Pavlyuchenkova (Czech Republic) L Šafářová	4	6	6
(Russia) V Dushevina (Russia) A Panova	6	2	4
WC	(France) C Garcia (France) M Johansson	6	3	6
(Germany) A Beck (Russia) V Solovyeva	1	6	4
Alt	(United States) M Keys (United States) M Oudin	4	6	3
(United States) L Davis (United States) M Moulton-Levy	6	3	6
WC	(France) A Cornet (France) V Razzano	3	4
7	(United States) B Mattek-Sands (India) S Mirza	6	6

Second round
3	(Russia) N Petrova (Slovenia) K Srebotnik	7	6
(Belarus) O Govortsova (Georgia (country)) A Tatishvili	5	1
(United States) V King (Romania) M Niculescu	6	6
(Germany) M Barthel (Latvia) L Dekmeijere	0	4
11	(Russia) A Pavlyuchenkova (Czech Republic) L Šafářová	6	6
WC	(France) C Garcia (France) M Johansson	2	4
(United States) L Davis (United States) M Moulton-Levy	6	3	0
7	(United States) B Mattek-Sands (India) S Mirza	1	6	6

Third round
3	(Russia) N Petrova (Slovenia) K Srebotnik	6	6
(United States) V King (Romania) M Niculescu	3	1
11	(Russia) A Pavlyuchenkova (Czech Republic) L Šafářová	7^{7}	3
7	(United States) B Mattek-Sands (India) S Mirza	6^{0}	5^{r}

Quarterfinals
3	(Russia) N Petrova (Slovenia) K Srebotnik	6	6
11	(Russia) A Pavlyuchenkova (Czech Republic) L Šafářová	3	3

=== Bottom half ===
==== Section 3 ====
First round
8	(Chinese Taipei) S-w Hsieh (China) S Peng	7	6
(United States) I Falconi (Bosnia and Herzegovina) M Jugić-Salkić	5	2
(Ukraine) I Buryachok (United Kingdom) H Watson	6	4	5
(Georgia (country)) O Kalashnikova (Poland) A Rosolska	3	6	7
(Slovakia) D Cibulková (Czech Republic) B Záhlavová-Strýcová	2	3
(Russia) S Kuznetsova (Italy) F Pennetta	6	6
(Spain) MT Torró Flor (Ukraine) L Tsurenko	2	5
10	(France) K Mladenovic (Kazakhstan) G Voskoboeva	6	7
16	(Slovakia) D Hantuchová (Spain) A Medina Garrigues	4	6	2
(Serbia) J Janković (Croatia) M Lučić-Baroni	6	3	6
WC	(France) S Beltrame (France) L Thorpe	3	6	6
(Croatia) P Martić (South Africa) C Scheepers	6	4	4
Alt	(Slovakia) J Čepelová (Czech Republic) Ka Plíšková	4	5
(Russia) N Bratchikova (Thailand) T Tanasugarn	6	7
(United States) M Burdette (United States) S Stephens	1	3
4	(Russia) E Makarova (Russia) E Vesnina	6	6

Second round
8	(Chinese Taipei) S-w Hsieh (China) S Peng	6	0	4
(Georgia (country)) O Kalashnikova (Poland) A Rosolska	4	6	6
(Russia) S Kuznetsova (Italy) F Pennetta	5	7^{8}	0
10	(France) K Mladenovic (Kazakhstan) G Voskoboeva	7	6^{6}	6
(Serbia) J Janković (Croatia) M Lučić-Baroni	7	6
WC	(France) S Beltrame (France) L Thorpe	5	3
(Russia) N Bratchikova (Thailand) T Tanasugarn	1	4
4	(Russia) E Makarova (Russia) E Vesnina	6	6

Third round
(Georgia (country)) O Kalashnikova (Poland) A Rosolska	1	1
10	(France) K Mladenovic (Kazakhstan) G Voskoboeva	6	6
(Serbia) J Janković (Croatia) M Lučić-Baroni	6^{3}	4
4	(Russia) E Makarova (Russia) E Vesnina	7^{7}	6

Quarterfinals
10	(France) K Mladenovic (Kazakhstan) G Voskoboeva	4	1
4	(Russia) E Makarova (Russia) E Vesnina	6	6

==== Section 4 ====
First round
5	(United States) L Huber (Spain) MJ Martínez Sánchez	1	3
(Italy) F Schiavone (Australia) S Stosur	6	6
(United States) C McHale (Austria) T Paszek	4	3
(Japan) K Date-Krumm (Spain) A Parra Santonja	6	6
(Zimbabwe) C Black (New Zealand) M Erakovic	6	6
(Germany) A Kerber (Germany) A Petkovic	2	1
(Netherlands) K Bertens (Germany) T Maria	4	4
9	(Germany) A-L Grönefeld (Czech Republic) K Peschke	6	6
13	(China) S Zhang (China) J Zheng	6^{5}	6	6
(Hungary) T Babos (Luxembourg) M Minella	7^{7}	4	3
(Japan) S Aoyama (Chinese Taipei) K-c Chang	1	1
(Japan) M Doi (Kazakhstan) Y Shvedova	6	6
(Romania) S Halep (Netherlands) A Rus	6^{2}	3
(Romania) S Cîrstea (Japan) A Morita	7^{7}	6
WC	(France) A Lim (France) A Rezaï	0	3
2	(Czech Republic) A Hlaváčková (Czech Republic) L Hradecká	6	6

Second round
(Italy) F Schiavone (Australia) S Stosur	2	7	6
(Japan) K Date-Krumm (Spain) A Parra Santonja	6	5	2
(Zimbabwe) C Black (New Zealand) M Erakovic	6	6
9	(Germany) A-L Grönefeld (Czech Republic) K Peschke	3	4
13	(China) S Zhang (China) J Zheng	w/o
(Japan) M Doi (Kazakhstan) Y Shvedova
(Romania) S Cîrstea (Japan) A Morita	5	6	0
2	(Czech Republic) A Hlaváčková (Czech Republic) L Hradecká	7	1	6

Third round
(Italy) F Schiavone (Australia) S Stosur	4	5
(Zimbabwe) C Black (New Zealand) M Erakovic	6	7
13	(China) S Zhang (China) J Zheng	3	6^{0}
2	(Czech Republic) A Hlaváčková (Czech Republic) L Hradecká	6	7^{7}

Quarterfinals
(Zimbabwe) C Black (New Zealand) M Erakovic	6	6^{3}	4
2	(Czech Republic) A Hlaváčková (Czech Republic) L Hradecká	2	7^{7}	6
