= 2013 Nanjing Ladies Open – Singles =

Singles
- 2013 Nanjing Ladies Open

Final
- Champion: (China) Zhang Shuai
- Runner-up: (Japan) Ayumi Morita
- Score: 6–4, ret.

Events
| Singles | Doubles |
| Nanjing Ladies Open | · 2014 → |

This was a new event of the WTA 125K series.

Zhang Shuai won the tournament after Ayumi Morita had to retire with an injured left hamstring having lost the first set 6–4.

== Seeds ==
1. (Japan) Kimiko Date-Krumm (first round)
2. (Belgium) Yanina Wickmayer (semifinals)
3. (China) Zhang Shuai (champion)
4. (Japan) Ayumi Morita (final; retired with hamstring injury)
5. (France) Caroline Garcia (first round)
6. (Japan) Misaki Doi (second round)
7. (Croatia) Ajla Tomljanović (second round)
8. (Slovakia) Anna Karolína Schmiedlová (quarterfinals)

== Draw ==
=== Key ===
- Q = Qualifier
- WC = Wild card
- LL = Lucky loser
- Alt = Alternate
- SE = Special exempt
- PR = Protected ranking
- ITF = ITF entry
- JE = Junior exempt
- w/o = Walkover
- r = Retired
- d = Defaulted
- SR = Special ranking

=== Finals ===
Semifinals
Q | (Australia) Jarmila Gajdošová | 6^{6} | 2
4 | (Japan) Ayumi Morita | 7^{8} | 6
3 | (China) Zhang Shuai | 1 | 6 | 6
2 | (Belgium) Yanina Wickmayer | 6 | 4 | 4

Final
4 | (Japan) Ayumi Morita | 4 | 0^{r}
3 | (China) Zhang Shuai | 6 | 0

=== Top half ===
First round
1 | (Japan) K Date-Krumm | 3 | 2
(China) Y Duan | 6 | 6
(Canada) S Dubois | 4 | 4
WC | (China) Q Wang | 6 | 6
LL | (Thailand) Pe Plipuech | 3 | 4
Q | (Australia) J Gajdošová | 6 | 6
Q | (China) Y Xu | 2 | 7^{7} | 4
6 | (Japan) M Doi | 6 | 6^{5} | 6
4 | (Japan) A Morita | 6 | 6
(Ukraine) O Savchuk | 2 | 4
(Croatia) P Martić | 6 | 6
(Russia) V Dushevina | 0 | 0
(Romania) I-C Begu | 2 | 6 | 6
(Russia) D Gavrilova | 6 | 4 | 2
(Japan) R Ozaki | 5 | 4
8 | (Slovakia) AK Schmiedlová | 7 | 6

Second round
(China) Y Duan | 6 | 6^{5} | 2
WC | (China) Q Wang | 3 | 7^{7} | 6
Q | (Australia) J Gajdošová | 6 | 6
6 | (Japan) M Doi | 3 | 4
4 | (Japan) A Morita | 6^{7} | 7^{12} | 6
(Croatia) P Martić | 7^{9} | 6^{10} | 4
(Romania) I-C Begu | 0 | 0
8 | (Slovakia) AK Schmiedlova | 6 | 6

Quarterfinals
WC | (China) Q Wang | 3 | 6 | 1
Q | (Australia) J Gajdošová | 6 | 2 | 6
4 | (Japan) A Morita | 6^{8} | 7^{7} | 7
8 | (Slovakia) AK Schmiedlová | 7^{10} | 6^{5} | 5

Semifinals
Q | (Australia) J Gajdošová | 6^{6} | 2
4 | (Japan) A Morita | 7^{8} | 6

=== Bottom half ===
First round
5 | (France) C Garcia | 4 | 4
(China) S Zheng | 6 | 6
Q | (Croatia) T Mrdeža | 4 | 0
(Russia) A Kudryavtseva | 6 | 6
WC | (China) Y Zhang | 6 | 1 | 1
(Israel) J Glushko | 4 | 6 | 6
Q | (Thailand) N Lertpitaksinchai | 3 | 0
3 | (China) S Zhang | 6 | 6
7 | (Croatia) A Tomljanović | 6 | 6
(Russia) O Puchkova | 4 | 4
(Germany) A-L Friedsam | 6^{4} | 6 | 7^{7}
(Poland) K Piter | 7^{7} | 1 | 6^{3}
WC | (China) Y Wang | 3 | 6 | 6
WC | (China) Z Sun | 6 | 3 | 2
(Kazakhstan) Y Shvedova | 5 | 2
2 | (Belgium) Y Wickmayer | 7 | 6

Second round
(China) S Zheng | 6 | 6
(Russia) A Kudryavtseva | 3 | 1
(Israel) J Glushko | 2 | 2
3 | (China) S Zhang | 6 | 6
7 | (Croatia) A Tomljanović | 4 | 4
(Germany) A-L Friedsam | 6 | 6
WC | (China) Y Wang | 2 | 2
2 | (Belgium) Y Wickmayer | 6 | 6

Quarterfinals
(China) S Zheng | 1 | 2
3 | (China) S Zhang | 6 | 6
(Germany) A-L Friedsam | 3 | 4
2 | (Belgium) Y Wickmayer | 6 | 6

Semifinals
3 | (China) S Zhang | 1 | 6 | 6
2 | (Belgium) Y Wickmayer | 6 | 4 | 4
