= 2013 Ningbo International Women's Tennis Open – Doubles =

Doubles
- 2013 Ningbo International Women's Tennis Open

Final
- Champions: (Chinese Taipei) Chan Yung-jan (China) Zhang Shuai
- Runners-up: (Ukraine) Irina Buryachok (Georgia (country)) Oksana Kalashnikova
- Score: 6–2, 6–1

Events
Singles	Doubles
- Ningbo International Women's Tennis Open

Shuko Aoyama and Chang Kai-chen were the defending champions, having won the 2012 Ningbo Challenger – Women's doubles, but both players chose not to participate.

Chan Yung-jan and Zhang Shuai won the title, defeating Irina Buryachok and Oksana Kalashnikova in the final, 6–2, 6–1.

== Seeds ==
1. (Russia) Vera Dushevina / (Croatia) Darija Jurak (first round)
2. (Hungary) Tímea Babos / (Poland) Alicja Rosolska (first round)
3. (Romania) Irina-Camelia Begu / (Slovakia) Janette Husárová (semifinals)
4. (Ukraine) Irina Buryachok / (Georgia (country)) Oksana Kalashnikova (final)

== Draw ==
Key

- Q = Qualifier
- WC = Wild card
- LL = Lucky loser
- Alt = Alternate
- ITF = ITF entry
- PR = Protected ranking
- SR = Special ranking
- SE = Special exempt
- JE = Junior exempt
- JR = Junior Accelerator Programme entrant
- CO = College Accelerator Programme entrant
- NG = Next Gen Accelerator Program entrant
- w/o = Walkover
- r = Retired
- d = Defaulted

First round
1	(Russia) V Dushevina (Croatia) D Jurak	3	2
(Canada) S Fichman (Israel) J Glushko	6	6
(Chinese Taipei) Y-j Chan (China) S Zhang	6	6
(Bolivia) MF Álvarez Terán (United States) K Wong	3	1
3	(Romania) I-C Begu (Slovakia) J Husárová	6	6
WC	(China) X Sun (China) W Zheng	1	0
(France) M Johansson (Sweden) J Larsson	3	5
(Serbia) V Dolonc (Belarus) O Govortsova	6	7
(United States) L Davis (Netherlands) R Hogenkamp	3	4
(Czech Republic) P Cetkovská (Czech Republic) Ka Plíšková	6	6
(Ukraine) Y Beygelzimer (Poland) K Piter	3	3
4	(Ukraine) I Buryachok (Georgia (country)) O Kalashnikova	6	6
(Thailand) L Kumkhum (Australia) K Wlodarczak	3	4
(Chinese Taipei) S-y Hsieh (China) Y Xu	6	6
(China) X Han (Japan) M Miyamura	7^{7}	6
2	(Hungary) T Babos (Poland) A Rosolska	6^{4}	4

Quarterfinals
(Canada) S Fichman (Israel) J Glushko	2	1
(Chinese Taipei) Y-j Chan (China) S Zhang	6	6
3	(Romania) I-C Begu (Slovakia) J Husárová	6	3	[13]
(Serbia) V Dolonc (Belarus) O Govortsova	3	6	[11]
(Czech Republic) P Cetkovská (Czech Republic) Ka Plíšková	3	3
4	(Ukraine) I Buryachok (Georgia (country)) O Kalashnikova	6	6
(Chinese Taipei) S-y Hsieh (China) Y Xu	2	4
(China) X Han (Japan) M Miyamura	6	6

Semifinals
(Chinese Taipei) Y-j Chan (China) S Zhang	w/o
3	(Romania) I-C Begu (Slovakia) J Husárová
4	(Ukraine) I Buryachok (Georgia (country)) O Kalashnikova	7^{8}	6
(China) X Han (Japan) M Miyamura	6^{6}	4

Final
(Chinese Taipei) Y-j Chan (China) S Zhang	6	6
4	(Ukraine) I Buryachok (Georgia (country)) O Kalashnikova	2	1
