= 2013 Ningbo International Women's Tennis Open – Singles =

WTA 125K series tennis singles tournament

Singles
- 2013 Ningbo International Women's Tennis Open

Final
- Champion: (Serbia) Bojana Jovanovski
- Runner-up: (China) Zhang Shuai
- Score: 6–7^{(7–9)}, 6–4, 6–1

Events
Singles	Doubles
- Ningbo International Women's Tennis Open

Hsieh Su-wei was the defending champion, having won the 2012 Ningbo Challenger – Women's singles, but decided not to participate.

Bojana Jovanovski won the title, defeating Zhang Shuai in the final, 6–7^{(7–9)}, 6–4, 6–1.

== Seeds ==
1. (Serbia) Bojana Jovanovski (champion)
2. (China) Zheng Jie (second round)
3. (Spain) Lourdes Domínguez Lino (second round)
4. (Austria) Yvonne Meusburger (semifinals)
5. (Ukraine) Lesia Tsurenko (first round)
6. (Czech Republic) Karolína Plíšková (first round)
7. (Kazakhstan) Yaroslava Shvedova (quarterfinals)
8. (United States) Lauren Davis (first round)

== Main draw ==
Key

- Q = Qualifier
- WC = Wild card
- LL = Lucky loser
- Alt = Alternate
- ITF = ITF entry
- PR = Protected ranking
- SR = Special ranking
- SE = Special exempt
- JE = Junior exempt
- JR = Junior Accelerator Programme entrant
- CO = College Accelerator Programme entrant
- NG = Next Gen Accelerator Program entrant
- w/o = Walkover
- r = Retired
- d = Defaulted

=== Finals ===
Semifinals
1	(Serbia) Bojana Jovanovski	4	7^{7}	6
(Sweden) Johanna Larsson	6	6^{2}	4
4	(Austria) Yvonne Meusburger	3	0
(China) Zhang Shuai	6	6

Final
1	(Serbia) Bojana Jovanovski	6^{7}	6	6
(China) Zhang Shuai	7^{9}	4	1

=== Top half ===
First round
1	(Serbia) B Jovanovski	6	6
(France) V Razzano	3	2
(Israel) S Pe'er	7	6
(Canada) S Fichman	5	1
(Belarus) O Govortsova	0	4
(Serbia) V Dolonc	6	6
(Slovakia) AK Schmiedlová	6	6
6	(Czech Republic) Ka Plíšková	3	3
3	(Spain) L Domínguez Lino	6	6
(Chinese Taipei) Y-j Chan	2	2
(Sweden) J Larsson	3	6	6
(Croatia) P Martić	6	4	2
Q	(Poland) K Piter	6	6
Q	(China) Y Wang	4	4
(United Kingdom) J Konta	6	4	6
8	(United States) L Davis	4	6	3

Second round
1	(Serbia) B Jovanovski	w/o
(Israel) S Pe'er
(Serbia) V Dolonc	0	1
(Slovakia) AK Schmiedlová	6	6
3	(Spain) L Domínguez Lino	0	6^{2}
(Sweden) J Larsson	6	7^{7}
Q	(Poland) K Piter	1	1
(United Kingdom) J Konta	6	6

Quarterfinals
1	(Serbia) B Jovanovski	6	7
(Slovakia) AK Schmiedlová	1	5
(Sweden) J Larsson	2	6	0
(United Kingdom) J Konta	6	3	0^{r}

Semifinals
1	(Serbia) B Jovanovski	4	7^{7}	6
(Sweden) J Larsson	6	6^{2}	4

=== Bottom half ===
First round
7	(Kazakhstan) Y Shvedova	6	2	6
(Hungary) T Babos	1	6	2
(Romania) I-C Begu	4	1
WC	(China) S Zheng	6	6
Q	(Czech Republic) P Cetkovská	6	6
WC	(China) Q Wang	4	1
Q	(Netherlands) R Hogenkamp	0	1
4	(Austria) Y Meusburger	6	6
5	(Ukraine) L Tsurenko	7^{7}	2	2
(Romania) A Dulgheru	6^{4}	6	6
WC	(China) Y Zhang	3	2
(Spain) A Medina Garrigues	6	6
(China) S Zhang	6	6
WC	(China) X Han	2	1
(Russia) O Puchkova	1	3
2	(China) J Zheng	6	6

Second round
7	(Kazakhstan) Y Shvedova	4	7	6
WC	(China) S Zheng	6	5	0
Q	(Czech Republic) P Cetkovská	2	1
4	(Austria) Y Meusburger	6	6
(Romania) A Dulgheru	2	3
(Spain) A Medina Garrigues	6	6
(China) S Zhang	6	6
2	(China) J Zheng	1	1

Quarterfinals
7	(Kazakhstan) Y Shvedova	2	4
4	(Austria) Y Meusburger	6	6
(Spain) A Medina Garrigues	4	6^{10}
(China) S Zhang	6	7^{12}

Semifinals
4	(Austria) Y Meusburger	3	0
(China) S Zhang	6	6
