= Nanjing Ladies Open =

Coordinates: 32.048777°N 118.860410°E

Defunct tennis tournament
- Founded: 2013; 13 years ago
- Abolished: 2015; 11 years ago
- Location: Nanjing; China
- Venue: Nanjing Sport Institute Tennis Academy of China
- Surface: Hard
- Prize money: $100,000 (2015)

The Nanjing Ladies Open was a tournament for professional female tennis players played on outdoor hard courts at the Nanjing Sport Institute Tennis Academy of China. The event was classified as a $100,000 ITF Women's Circuit tournament. It was held in Nanjing, China, from 2013 to 2015. The event was part of the WTA 125K series in 2013.

== Past finals ==
=== Singles ===
Year	Champion	Runner-up	Score
2015	(Chinese Taipei) Hsieh Su-wei	(Kazakhstan) Yulia Putintseva	7–6^{(7–5)}, 2–6, 6–2
↑ ITF $100,000 event ↑
2014	Not held		
2013	(China) Zhang Shuai	(Japan) Ayumi Morita	6–4, retired
↑ WTA $125,000 event ↑

=== Doubles ===
Year	Champions	Runners-up	Score
2015	(Japan) Shuko Aoyama (Japan) Eri Hozumi	(Chinese Taipei) Chan Chin-wei (China) Zhang Kailin	7–5, 6–7^{(7–9)}, [10–7]
↑ ITF $100,000 event ↑
2014	Not held		
2013	(Japan) Misaki Doi (China) Xu Yifan	(Kazakhstan) Yaroslava Shvedova (China) Zhang Shuai	6–1, 6–4
↑ WTA $125,000 event ↑
