= Ayumi Morita =

Japanese tennis player (born 1990)

Ayumi Morita 森田 あゆみ
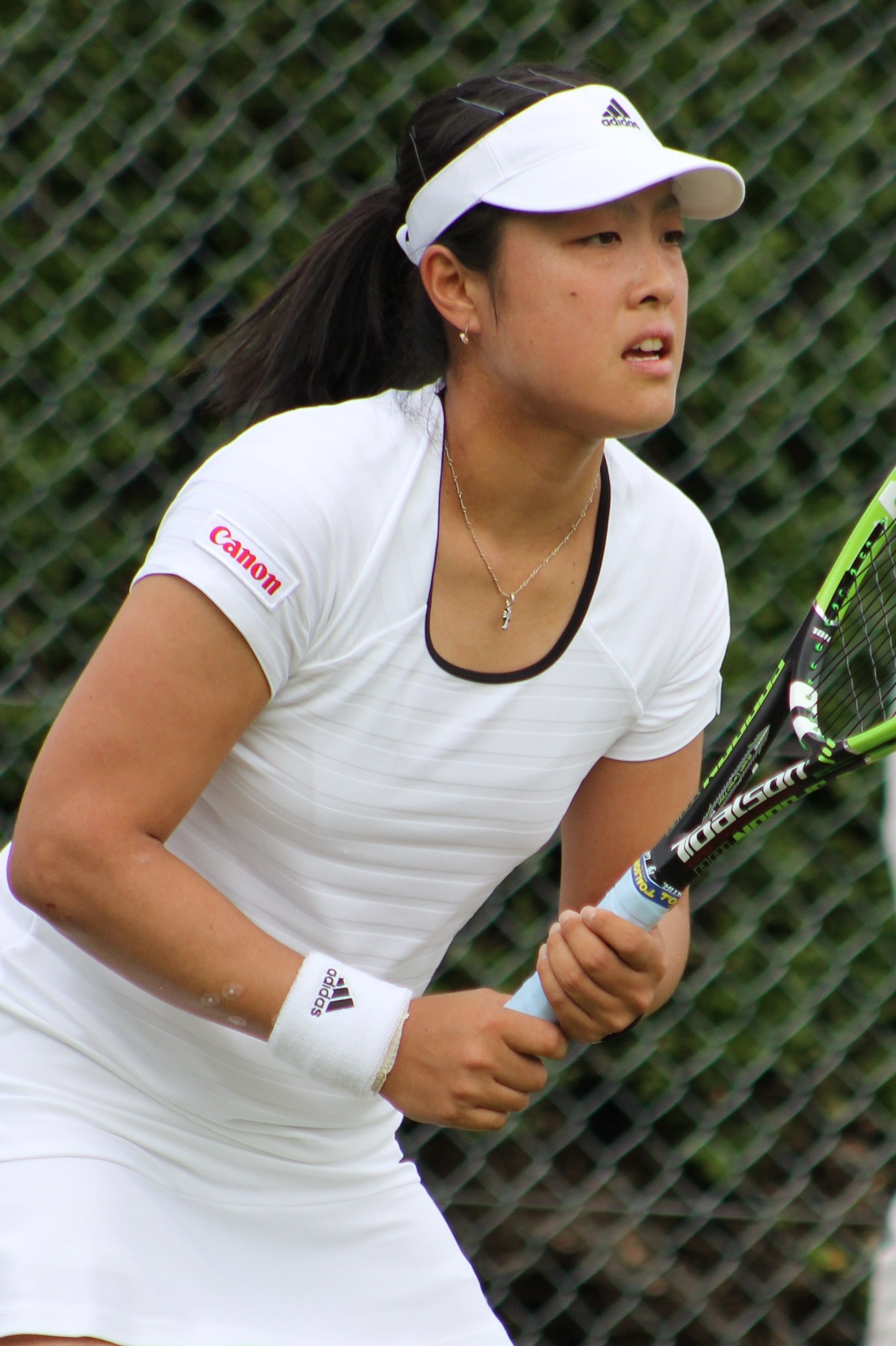
- Morita during the 2015 Wimbledon Qualifying
- Country (sports): Japan
- Residence: Ōta, Japan
- Born: 11 March 1990 (age 36) Ōta
- Height: 1.64 m (5 ft 5 in)
- Turned pro: 2005
- Retired: 2023
- Plays: Right-handed (two-handed both sides)
- Prize money: US$ 1,682,518
- Official website: http://ayumi-morita.com

Singles
- Career record: 295–241
- Career titles: 10 ITF
- Highest ranking: No. 40 (3 October 2011)

Grand Slam singles results
- Australian Open: 3R (2011, 2013)
- French Open: 2R (2011, 2012)
- Wimbledon: 2R (2010, 2012)
- US Open: 2R (2012)

Doubles
- Career record: 75–68
- Career titles: 3 ITF
- Highest ranking: No. 65 (9 February 2009)

Grand Slam doubles results
- Australian Open: 3R (2012)
- French Open: 2R (2013)
- Wimbledon: 3R (2011)
- US Open: 2R (2010)

Team competitions
- Fed Cup: 23–14

Ayumi Morita (森田 あゆみ, Morita Ayumi; born 11 March 1990) is a Japanese former professional tennis player. She reached a career-high ranking of No. 40 in the world in October 2011. At junior level, she reached a combined career-high ranking of No. 3.

Morita is recognized for her two‑handed groundstrokes, which she strikes with a characteristically flat trajectory. A small, quick athlete, Morita possesses good footwork and court coverage, allowing her to neutralize opponents and dictate play through movement and precision. Morita is one of the most successful Fed Cup players of recent times with a 23–14 match win-loss record for Japan.

== Career ==
On September 16, 2008, she beat world No. 19, Ágnes Szávay, in three sets in the Pan Pacific Open.

In January 2009, Morita upset former Wimbledon quarterfinalist Michaëlla Krajicek in the final round of qualifying to reach the main draw of the Auckland Open. She faced third set deficits in all three of her qualifying matches, including a 4–1 deficit in her first match against Katie O'Brien.

=== 2011 ===
Her first tournament of the season was the Auckland Open. She faced Romanian teenager Simona Halep and lost in straight sets despite recovering from being two breaks down in the second set. Her next tournament was the Hobart International. She beat Akgul Amanmuradova. Her next opponent was Bethanie Mattek-Sands, to whom she lost in two sets. Ayumi played at the Australian Open where she defeated No. 27 seed Alexandra Dulgheru in two sets. She defeated wildcard Caroline Garcia in the second round but lost to Peng Shuai in the third.

Into the Dubai Championships, Morita qualified by defeating Sophie Lefèvre and Vesna Manasieva. In the first round of the main draw, she defeated No. 14 seed Petra Kvitová in two tiebreaks. Before the match, Kvitová had only lost once in 2011 and had already won two titles. Morita beat wildcard Sania Mirza in the second round, before losing to Caroline Wozniacki in the third.

=== 2013 ===
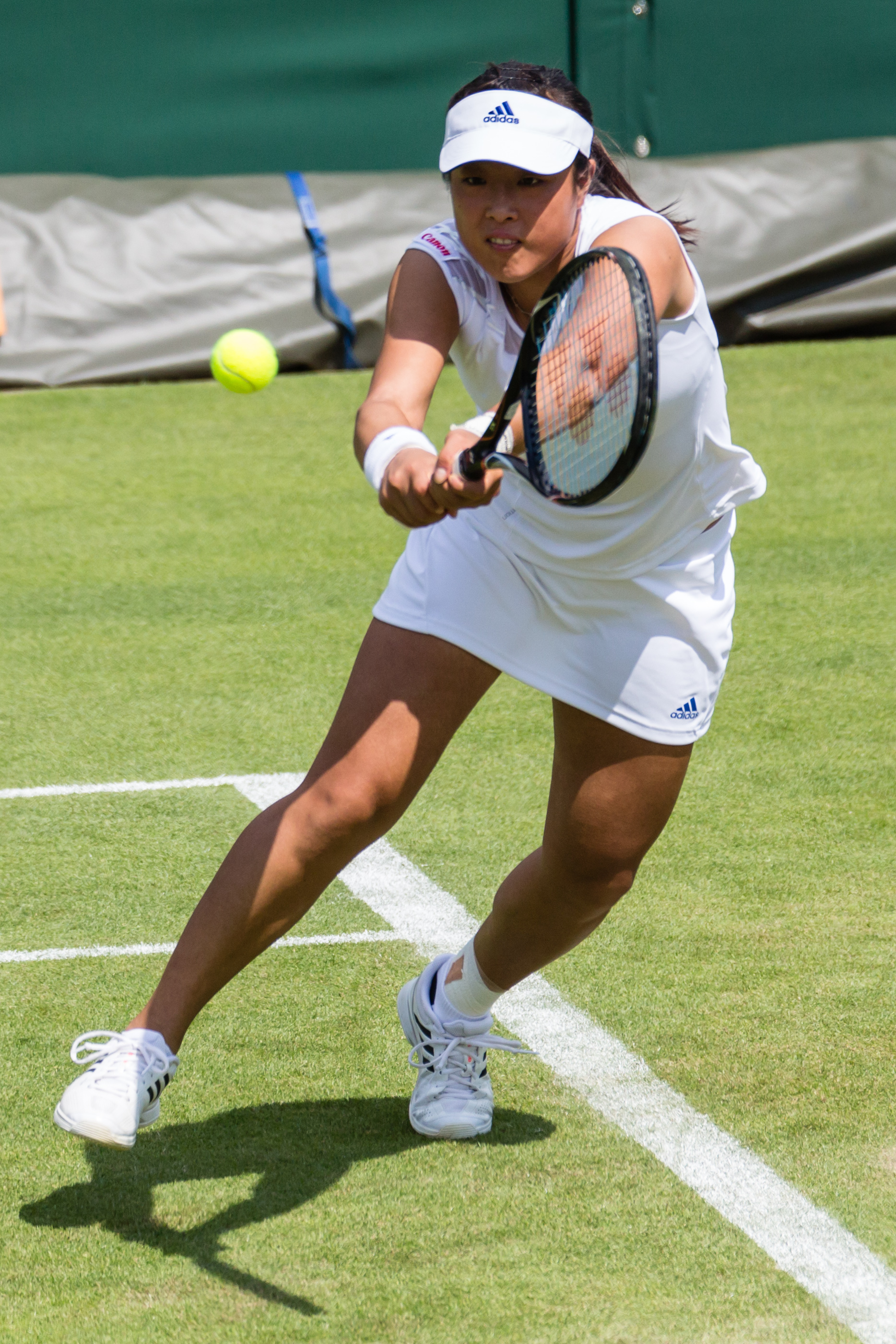
Morita at the 2013 Wimbledon Championships

Morita began her season at the first edition of the Shenzhen Open where she lost in the second round to sixth seed Peng Shuai. After qualifying for the Sydney International, Morita reached the second round where she was defeated by fourth-seeded Li Na. Ranked 72 at the Australian Open, Morita reached the third round with straight-set victories over Anna Tatishvili and Annika Beck. She lost her third-round match to the third seed, Serena Williams.

In Thailand at the Pattaya Open, Morita upset top seed, Ana Ivanovic, in the first round. She then beat Kimiko Date-Krumm to advance to the quarterfinals in which she was defeated by Nina Bratchikova. During the Fed Cup tie versus Russia, Morita won both of her rubbers over Ekaterina Makarova and Elena Vesnina. Russia ended up winning 3-2. Morita retired from her second round of qualifying match at the Dubai Championships to Zheng Jie. Seeded fourth at the Malaysian Open, Morita lost in the semifinal round to eventual champion Karolína Plíšková. In Indian Wells, Morita was defeated in the first round by qualifier Lesia Tsurenko. At the Miami Open, she made it to the third round by defeating Heather Watson and 31st seed Yanina Wickmayer. She lost her third-round match to top seed and eventual champion, Serena Williams. Seeded eighth at the Monterrey Open, Morita was defeated in her quarterfinal match by top seed and eventual finalist, Angelique Kerber. Playing in the Fed Cup tie versus Spain, Morita lost both of her matches to Sílvia Soler Espinosa and Carla Suárez Navarro. Spain won 4-0.

Morita began her clay-court season at the Portugal Open where she was defeated in her quarterfinal match by defending champion Kaia Kanepi. Morita retired during her first-round match at the Madrid Open against Sorana Cîrstea due to a left abductor strain. She returned to action at the Italian Open where she made it to the third round beating Sorana Cîrstea and Urszula Radwańska. She retired from her third-round match against third seed Victoria Azarenka, again due to injury. Ranked 44 at the French Open, Morita lost in the first round to Yulia Putintseva.

Beginning her grass-court season at the Birmingham Classic, she was defeated in the first round by qualifier Alison Van Uytvanck. At the Rosmalen Open, Morita lost in the first round to Sofia Arvidsson. Ranked 50 at the Wimbledon Championships, she was again defeated in the first round, by Marina Erakovic.

Starting her US Open Series at the Silicon Valley Classic, Morita lost in round one to fifth seed Sorana Cîrstea. At the Southern California Open, she was defeated in the first round by Laura Robson. Advancing to the main draw as a lucky loser at the Rogers Cup, she lost to American Varvara Lepchenko. In Cincinnati at the Western & Southern Open, Morita was defeated in the first round of qualifying by Alison Riske. After qualifying for the New Haven Open at Yale, Morita retired during her first-round match against Elena Vesnina due to a low back injury. The low back injury caused her to withdraw from the US Open.

In Tokyo at the Pan Pacific Open, Morita beat Laura Robson in her first-round match. She lost in the second round to sixth seed Jelena Janković. At the Japan Women's Open, Morita was defeated in the first round by Luksika Kumkhum. Seeded fourth at the Nanjing Ladies Open, Morita made it to the final where she retired against third seed Zhang Shuai due to a left hamstring injury. Morita played her final tournament of the season at the Taipei Open. Seeded fourth, she lost in the first round to Yaroslava Shvedova.

Morita ended the year ranked 61.

=== 2014 ===
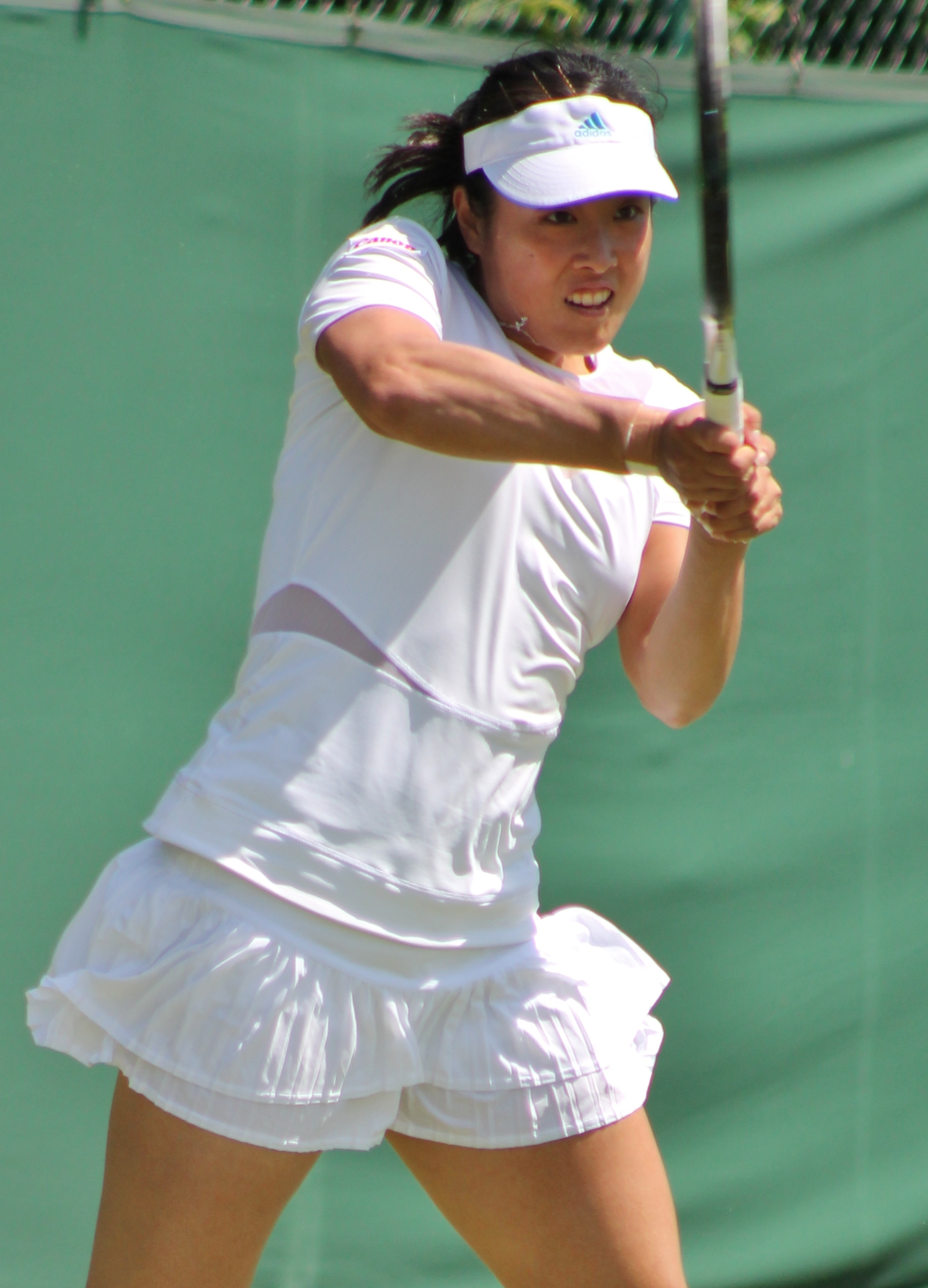
Morita during the 2014 Wimbledon qualifying

Morita started her 2014 season at the Auckland Open. She upset sixth seed Lucie Šafářová in the first round. In the second round, she lost to compatriot Kurumi Nara. At the Sydney International, she retired during her first qualifying match against Tsvetana Pironkova due to injury. Ranked 61 at the Australian Open, Morita was defeated in the second round by eighth seed Jelena Janković.

In Mexico at the Monterrey Open, she retired during her second-round clash against sixth seed Magdaléna Rybáriková due to dizziness. Seeded eighth at the Malaysian Open, she lost in the first round to qualifier Lyudmyla Kichenok.

=== 2023: Retirement ===
In August 2023, Morita announced her retirement from tennis.

== Grand Slam performance timelines ==
Key
W	F	SF	QF	#R	RR	Q#	DNQ	A	NH

(W) winner; (F) finalist; (SF) semifinalist; (QF) quarterfinalist; (#R) rounds 4, 3, 2, 1; (RR) round-robin stage; (Q#) qualification round; (DNQ) did not qualify; (A) absent; (NH) not held; (SR) strike rate (events won / competed); (W–L) win–loss record.
To avoid confusion and double counting, these charts are updated at the conclusion of a tournament or when the player's participation has ended.

=== Singles ===
Tournament	2006	2007	2008	2009	2010	2011	2012	2013	2014	2015	2016	2017	W–L
Australian Open	A	Q2	Q3	1R	1R	3R	1R	3R	2R	A	A	Q1	5–6
French Open	A	Q1	1R	1R	1R	2R	2R	1R	Q2	A	A	A	2–6
Wimbledon	A	1R	Q1	1R	2R	1R	2R	1R	Q2	Q1	A	A	2–6
US Open	Q1	Q1	Q1	1R	1R	1R	2R	A	A	A	A	A	1–4
Win–loss	0–0	0–1	0–1	0–4	1–4	3–4	3–4	2–3	1–1	0–0	0–0	0–0	10–22

=== Doubles ===
Tournament	2008	2009	2010	2011	2012	2013	W–L
Australian Open	A	2R	A	2R	3R	1R	4–4
French Open	A	1R	A	1R	1R	2R	1–4
Wimbledon	1R	1R	2R	3R	1R	1R	3–6
US Open	A	1R	2R	2R	A	A	2–3
Win–loss	0–1	1–4	2–2	4–4	2–3	1–3	10–17

== WTA Tour finals ==
=== Doubles: 2 (runner-ups) ===
Legend
Grand Slam
WTA 1000
WTA 500
Tier III / WTA 250 (0–2)

Result	W–L	Date	Tournament	Tier	Surface	Partner	Opponents	Score
Loss	0–1	Oct 2007	Bangkok Open, Thailand	Tier III	Hard	(Japan) Junri Namigata	(China) Sun Tiantian (China) Yan Zi	w/o
Loss	0–2	Sep 2008	Japan Open Championships	Tier III	Hard	(Japan) Aiko Nakamura	(United States) Jill Craybas (New Zealand) Marina Erakovic	6–4, 5–7, [6–10]

== WTA Challenger finals ==
=== Singles: 1 (runner-up) ===
Result	W–L	Date	Tournament	Surface	Opponent	Score
Loss	0–1	Nov 2013	Nanjing Ladies Open, China	Hard	(China) Zhang Shuai	4–6, ret.

== ITF Circuit finals ==
Legend
$100,000 tournaments
$75,000 tournaments
$50,000 tournaments
$25,000 tournaments
$15,000 tournaments

=== Singles: 19 (10 titles, 9 runner-ups) ===
Result	W–L	Date	Tournament	Tier	Surface	Opponent	Score
Loss	0–1	May 2005	Fukuoka International, Japan	50,000	Grass	(Chinese Taipei) Chan Yung-jan	3–6, 2–6
Loss	0–2	May 2006	Fukuoka International, Japan	50,000	Grass	(Chinese Taipei) Chan Yung-jan	3–6, 6–4, 1–6
Win	1–2	Aug 2006	ITF Tokachi, Japan	25,000	Carpet	(Japan) Erika Takao	6–3, 4–6, 7–6^{(6)}
Win	2–2	Sep 2006	ITF Tokyo Open, Japan	50,000	Hard	(Chinese Taipei) Chan Yung-jan	3–6, 6–3, 6–4
Loss	2–3	May 2007	Kangaroo Cup Gifu, Japan	50,000	Hard	(Chinese Taipei) Chan Yung-jan	3–6, 1–6
Loss	2–4	Jun 2007	Surbiton Trophy, United Kingdom	25,000	Grass	(Netherlands) Brenda Schultz-McCarthy	6–4, 4–6, 6–7^{(5)}
Win	3–4	Jul 2007	Kurume Cup, Japan	25,000	Grass	(Japan) Erika Takao	6–1, 3–1 ret.
Loss	3–5	Aug 2007	ITF Obihiro, Japan	25,000	Carpet	(Australia) Sophie Ferguson	4–6, 3–6
Win	4–5	Nov 2008	ITF Tokyo Open, Japan	50,000	Hard	(Australia) Jarmila Gajdošová	6–2, 2–6, 6–3
Win	5–5	Nov 2008	ITF Kolkata, India	50,000	Hard	(Romania) Elora Dabija	6–3, 6–1
Win	6–5	Nov 2008	Toyota World Challenge, Japan	75,000	Carpet (i)	(Russia) Ksenia Lykina	6–1, 6–3
Loss	6–6	Nov 2009	Taipei Open, Taiwan	100,000	Carpet (i)	(Chinese Taipei) Chan Yung-jan	4–6, 6–2, 2–6
Win	7–6	Oct 2010	Toyota World Challenge, Japan	100,000	Carpet (i)	(United States) Jill Craybas	6–3, 7–5
Loss	7–7	Nov 2010	Taipei Open, Taiwan	100,000	Carpet (i)	(China) Peng Shuai	1–6, 4–6
Win	8–7	Oct 2011	Taipei Open, Taiwan	100,000	Carpet (i)	(Japan) Kimiko Date-Krumm	6–2, 6–2
Loss	8–8	Nov 2021	ITF Monastir, Tunisia	15,000	Hard	(United Kingdom) Sonay Kartal	1–6, 2–6
Loss	8–9	Feb 2022	ITF Monastir, Tunisia	15,000	Hard	(Japan) Haruna Arakawa	w/o
Win	9–9	May 2022	ITF Monastir, Tunisia	15,000	Hard	(China) Yao Xinxin	7–6^{(4)}, 7–5
Win	10–9	May 2022	ITF Monastir, Tunisia	15,000	Hard	Milana Zhabrailova	7–5, 6–0

=== Doubles: 7 (3 titles, 4 runner-ups) ===
Result	W–L	Date	Tournament	Tier	Surface	Partner	Opponents	Score
Loss	0–1	Jul 2005	Kurume Cup, Japan	25,000	Grass	(Japan) Erika Sema	(Chinese Taipei) Chan Chin-wei (Chinese Taipei) Hsieh Su-wei	4–6, 3–6
Loss	0–2	Feb 2006	ITF Sydney, Australia	25,000	Hard	(Japan) Junri Namigata	(Chinese Taipei) Chan Yung-jan (Chinese Taipei) Chuang Chia-jung	2–6, 1–6
Loss	0–3	Feb 2007	ITF Melbourne, Australia	25,000	Clay	(Japan) Natsumi Hamamura	(Chinese Taipei) Hwang I-hsuan (South Korea) Lee Ye-ra	2–6, 1–6
Win	1–3	May 2007	Kangaroo Cup Gifu, Japan	50,000	Hard	(Japan) Ai Sugiyama	(Japan) Kumiko Iijima (Japan) Seiko Okamoto	6–1, 3–6, 6–0
Win	2–3	May 2007	Fukuoka International, Japan	50,000	Grass	(Japan) Akiko Yonemura	(Japan) Rika Fujiwara (Japan) Junri Namigata	6–2, 6–2
Loss	2–4	Aug 2007	ITF Obihiro, Japan	25,000	Carpet	(Japan) Akiko Yonemura	(Japan) Kumiko Iijima (Japan) Junri Namigata	6–7^{(3)}, 0–6
Win	3–4	Oct 2009	ITF Tokyo Open, Japan	100,000	Hard	(Chinese Taipei) Chan Yung-jan	(Japan) Kimiko Date-Krumm (Japan) Rika Fujiwara	6–2, 6–4
