= Irina Buryachok =

Ukrainian tennis player

Irina Buryachok Ірина Бурячок
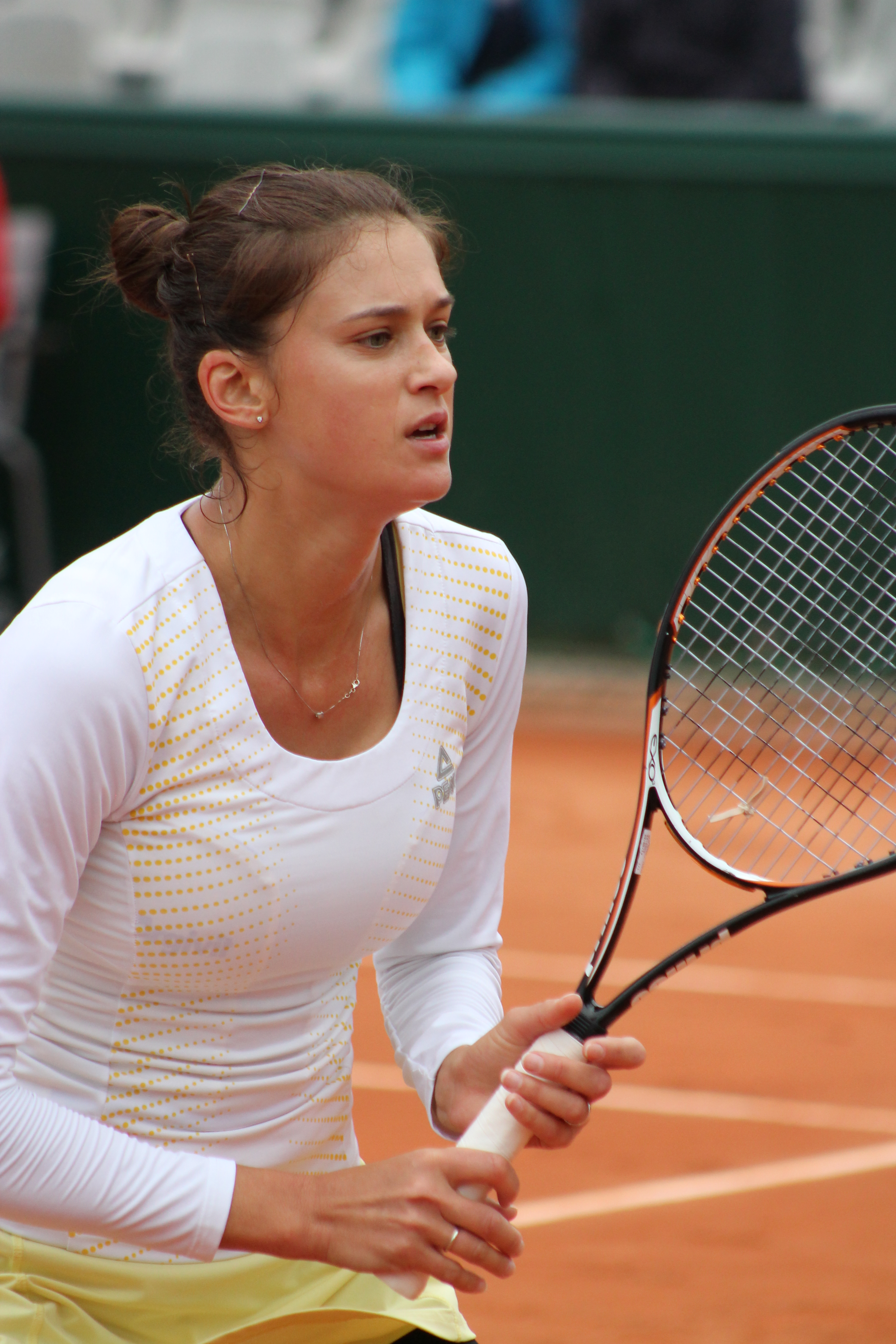
- Buryachok at Roland Garros, 2013
- Country (sports): Ukraine
- Residence: Lecce, Italy
- Born: 5 July 1986 (age 40) Kherson, Ukrainian SSR
- Plays: Right (two-handed backhand)
- Prize money: $219,757

Singles
- Career record: 258–223
- Career titles: 4 ITF
- Highest ranking: No. 183 (14 June 2010)

Doubles
- Career record: 207–165
- Career titles: 2 WTA, 13 ITF
- Highest ranking: No. 66 (17 March 2014)

Grand Slam doubles results
- Australian Open: 1R (2014)
- French Open: 1R (2013, 2014)
- Wimbledon: 1R (2013, 2014)
- US Open: 1R (2013)

Irina Buryachok (Ukrainian: Ірина Бурячок; born 5 July 1986) is a former tennis player from Ukraine.

On 14 June 2010, she reached a career-high singles ranking of world No. 183, and on 17 March 2014, she peaked at No. 66 in the doubles rankings.

In 2012, she won her first WTA Tour title in Baku, partnering Valeria Solovieva, and in 2013 reached a final in Shenzhen, China.

She lives in Italy where she had been training.

== WTA Tour finals ==
=== Doubles: 3 (2 titles, 1 runner-up) ===
Legend International (2–1)	Finals by surface Hard (2–1)

Result	Date	Tournament	Surface	Partner	Opponents	Score
Win	Jul 2012	Baku Cup, Azerbaijan	Hard	(Russia) Valeria Solovieva	(Czech Republic) Eva Birnerová (Italy) Alberta Brianti	6–3, 6–2
Loss	Jan 2013	Shenzhen Open, China	Hard	(Russia) Valeria Solovieva	(Chinese Taipei) Chan Hao-ching (Chinese Taipei) Chan Yung-jan	0–6, 5–7
Win	Jul 2013	Baku Cup, Azerbaijan	Hard	(Georgia (country)) Oksana Kalashnikova	(Greece) Eleni Daniilidou (Serbia) Aleksandra Krunić	4–6, 7–6^{(7–3)}, [10–4]

== WTA Challenger finals ==
=== Doubles: 1 (runner-up) ===
Result	Date	Tournament	Surface	Partner	Opponents	Score
Loss	Sep 2013	Ningbo International, China	Hard	(Georgia (country)) Oksana Kalashnikova	(Chinese Taipei) Chan Yung-jan (China) Zhang Shuai	2–6, 1–6

== ITF Circuit finals ==
$50,000 tournaments
$25,000 tournaments
$10,000 tournaments

=== Singles: 10 (4–6) ===
Result	No.	Date	Tournament	Surface	Opponent	Score
Loss	1.	9 April 2005	ITF Ramat HaSharon, Israel	Hard	(Czech Republic) Iveta Gerlová	6–3, 4–6, 1–6
Win	1.	30 April 2006	ITF Cavtat, Croatia	Clay	(Belgium) Caroline Maes	3–6, 6–4, 6–1
Loss	2.	26 July 2008	ITF Kharkiv, Ukraine	Clay	(Ukraine) Kristina Antoniychuk	3–6, 6–4, 1–6
Loss	3.	14 September 2008	ITF Innsbruck, Austria	Clay	(Italy) Evelyn Mayr	1–6, 6–2, 1–6
Win	2.	2 May 2009	ITF Brescia, Italy	Clay	(Italy) Anna-Giulia Remondina	6–3, 6–3
Win	3.	14 June 2009	ITF Campobasso, Italy	Clay	(Italy) Nathalie Viérin	6–4, 6–4
Loss	4.	27 September 2009	ITF Madrid, Spain	Hard	(Spain) Sílvia Soler Espinosa	3–6, 4–6
Loss	5.	14 March 2010	ITF Buchen, Germany	Carpet (i)	(Switzerland) Romina Oprandi	1–6, 3–6
Loss	6.	25 September 2010	Telavi Open, Georgia	Clay	(Austria) Melanie Klaffner	6–3, 0–6, 0–3 ret.
Win	4.	16 May 2011	ITF Brescia, Italy	Clay	(Italy) Giulia Gatto-Monticone	6–7^{(5)}, 6–2, 6–2

=== Doubles: 31 (13–18) ===
Result	No.	Date	Tournament	Surface	Partner	Opponents	Score
Loss	1.	6 June 2004	ITF Istanbul, Turkey	Hard	(Russia) Aleksandra Kostikova	(Georgia (country)) Tatia Mikadze (Georgia (country)) Nana Urotadze	1–6, 2–6
Loss	2.	6 February 2005	ITF Vale do Lobo, Portugal	Hard	(Russia) Olga Panova	(Romania) Mădălina Gojnea (Romania) Gabriela Niculescu	3–6, 4–6
Win	1.	20 February 2005	ITF Portimão, Portugal	Hard	(Russia) Olga Panova	(France) Anaïs Laurendon (Slovakia) Linda Smoleňáková	6–4, 6–2
Win	2.	9 April 2005	ITF Ramat HaSharon, Israel	Hard	(France) Charlène Vanneste	(Belgium) Jessie de Vries (Turkey) Pemra Özgen	6–1, 6–2
Loss	3.	8 May 2005	ITF Antalya, Turkey	Clay	(Russia) Olga Panova	(Romania) Gabriela Niculescu (Romania) Monica Niculescu	3–6, 4–6
Loss	4.	17 July 2005	ITF Istanbul, Turkey	Hard	(Russia) Vasilisa Davydova	(Turkey) Pemra Özgen (Spain) Gabriela Velasco Andreu	2–6, 3–6
Loss	5.	18 May 2007	ITF Caserta, Italy	Clay	(Russia) Varvara Galanina	(Switzerland) Lisa Sabino (Germany) Andrea Sieveke	6–7^{(4)}, 2–6
Loss	6.	20 July 2007	ITF Rome-Tevere, Italy	Clay	(Austria) Patricia Mayr	(Chinese Taipei) Chan Chin-wei (Ukraine) Tetiana Luzhanska	3–6, 1–6
Loss	7.	9 August 2007	ITF Jesi, Italy	Carpet	(Italy) Alice Balducci	(Spain) Melisa Cabrera-Handt (Spain) Carolina Gago-Fuentes	5–7, 6–4, 4–6
Loss	8.	11 July 2008	ITF Roma-Tevere, Italy	Clay	(Austria) Patricia Mayr	(Latvia) Irina Kuzmina (Ukraine) Oksana Lyubtsova	4–6, 6–4, [7–10]
Loss	9.	17 August 2008	ITF Penza, Russia	Clay	(Czech Republic) Nikola Fraňková	(Kyrgyzstan) Ksenia Palkina (Georgia (country)) Sofia Shapatava	4–6, 4–6
Win	3.	13 September 2008	ITF Innsbruck, Austria	Clay	(Georgia (country)) Oksana Kalashnikova	(Switzerland) Conny Perrin (Switzerland) Nicole Riner	3–6, 6–3, [10–7]
Win	4.	24 April 2009	ITF Bari, Italy	Clay	(Czech Republic) Renata Voráčová	(Sweden) Johanna Larsson (United Kingdom) Anna Smith	5–7, 6–2, [10–5]
Win	5.	1 May 2009	ITF Brescia, Italy	Clay	(Netherlands) Marlot Meddens	(Italy) Elena Pioppo (Italy) Lisa Sabino	6–4, 2–6, [14–12]
Win	6.	18 July 2009	ITF Bucha, Ukraine	Clay	(Ukraine) Oksana Teplyakova	(Russia) Eugeniya Pashkova (Ukraine) Anastasiya Vasylyeva	6–4, 6–4
Loss	10.	24 July 2009	ITF Kharkiv, Ukraine	Clay	(Ukraine) Kristina Antoniychuk	(Australia) Monique Adamczak (Australia) Nicole Kriz	3–6, 6–7^{(4)}
Win	7.	15 August 2009	ITF Innsbruck, Austria	Clay	(Italy) Julia Mayr	(France) Chloé Babet (Italy) Valentine Confalonieri	6–1, 6–7^{(2)}, [10–8]
Win	8.	14 March 2010	ITF Buchen, Germany	Carpet (i)	(Switzerland) Amra Sadiković	(Czech Republic) Simona Dobrá (Czech Republic) Tereza Hladíková	7–5, 6–3
Loss	11.	9 April 2010	ITF Civitavecchia, Italy	Clay	(Estonia) Maret Ani	(Belarus) Darya Kustova (Czech Republic) Renata Voráčová	5–7, 5–7
Win	9.	23 April 2010	ITF Bari, Italy	Clay	(Russia) Anastasia Pivovarova	(Italy) Giulia Gatto-Monticone (Italy) Federica Quercia	6–7^{(3)}, 6–4, [10–4]
Win	10.	5 June 2010	ITF Sarajevo, Bosnia and Herzegovina	Clay	(France) Irena Pavlovic	(Italy) Nicole Clerico (Poland) Karolina Kosińska	6–1, 6–1
Win	11.	14 February 2011	ITF Mallorca, Spain	Clay	(France) Iryna Brémond	(Czech Republic) Iveta Gerlová (Czech Republic) Lucie Kriegsmannová	7–5, 6–2
Loss	12.	21 March 2011	ITF Kunming, China	Clay	(Ukraine) Veronika Kapshay	(Japan) Shuko Aoyama (Japan) Rika Fujiwara	3–6, 2–6
Loss	13.	13 June 2011	ITF Padua, Italy	Clay	(Hungary) Réka Luca Jani	(France) Kristina Mladenovic (Poland) Katarzyna Piter	4–6, 3–6
Win	12.	19 September 2011	ITF Tbilisi, Georgia	Clay	(Hungary) Réka Luca Jani	(Romania) Elena Bogdan (Chile) Andrea Koch Benvenuto	6–7^{(3)}, 2–6
Loss	14.	27 November 2011	ITF Helsinki, Finland	Hard (i)	(Hungary) Tímea Babos	(Slovakia) Janette Husárová (Finland) Emma Laine	7–5, 5–7, [9–11]
Loss	15.	30 January 2012	Rancho Santa Fe Open, United States	Hard	(Ukraine) Elizaveta Ianchuk	(United States) Maria Sanchez (United States) Yasmin Schnack	6–7^{(7)}, 6–4 [8–10]
Loss	16.	17 September 2012	ITF Yoshkar-Ola, Russia	Hard (i)	(Russia) Valeria Solovyeva	(Russia) Margarita Gasparyan (Ukraine) Veronika Kapshay	4–6, 6–2, [9–11]
Loss	17.	12 November 2012	ITF Helsinki, Finland	Carpet (i)	(Russia) Valeria Solovyeva	(Ukraine) Lyudmyla Kichenok (Ukraine) Nadiia Kichenok	3–6, 3–6
Loss	18.	17 December 2012	Ankara Cup, Turkey	Hard (i)	(Russia) Valeria Solovyeva	(Poland) Magda Linette (Poland) Katarzyna Piter	2–6, 2–6
Win	13.	11 January 2013	Blossom Cup, China	Hard	(Ukraine) Nadiia Kichenok	(China) Liang Chen (China) Sun Shengnan	3–6, 6–3, [12–10]
