= 2017 WTA Elite Trophy – Singles =

Singles
- 2017 WTA Elite Trophy

Final
- Champion: (Germany) Julia Görges
- Runner-up: (United States) CoCo Vandeweghe
- Score: 7–5, 6–1

Events
Singles	Doubles
- WTA Elite Trophy

Petra Kvitová was the defending champion, but failed to qualify this year. Julia Görges won the title, defeating CoCo Vandeweghe in the final, 7–5, 6–1.

== Players ==
1. (France) Kristina Mladenovic (round robin)
2. (United States) CoCo Vandeweghe (final)
3. (United States) Sloane Stephens (round robin)
4. (Russia) Anastasia Pavlyuchenkova (round robin)
5. (Latvia) Anastasija Sevastova (semifinals)
6. (Russia) Elena Vesnina (round robin)
7. (Germany) Julia Görges (champion)
8. (Germany) Angelique Kerber (round robin)
9. (Australia) Ashleigh Barty (semifinals)
10. (Slovakia) Magdaléna Rybáriková (round robin)
11. (Czech Republic) Barbora Strýcová (round robin)
12. (China) Peng Shuai (round robin)

== Alternates ==
1. (China) Zhang Shuai (Did not play)
2. (China) Duan Yingying (Did not play)

== Draw ==
Key

- Q = Qualifier
- WC = Wild card
- LL = Lucky loser
- Alt = Alternate
- ITF = ITF entry
- PR = Protected ranking
- SR = Special ranking
- SE = Special exempt
- JE = Junior exempt
- JR = Junior Accelerator Programme entrant
- CO = College Accelerator Programme entrant
- NG = Next Gen Accelerator Program entrant
- w/o = Walkover
- r = Retired
- d = Defaulted

=== Finals ===
Semifinals
2	(United States) CoCo Vandeweghe	6	6
9	(Australia) Ashleigh Barty	3	3
7	(Germany) Julia Görges	6	6
5	(Latvia) Anastasija Sevastova	3	3

Final
2	(United States) CoCo Vandeweghe	5	1
7	(Germany) Julia Görges	7	6

=== Azalea group ===
		(France) Mladenovic	(Germany) Görges	(Slovakia) Rybáriková	RR W–L	Set W–L	Game W–L	Standings
1	(France) Kristina Mladenovic		2–6, 6–7^{(4–7)}	5–7, 6–1, 6–7^{(5–7)}	0–2	1–4 (20%)	25–28 (47%)	3
7	(Germany) Julia Görges	6–2, 7–6^{(7–4)}		6–1, 7–6^{(7–5)}	2–0	4–0 (100%)	26–15 (63%)	1
10	(Slovakia) Magdaléna Rybáriková	7–5, 1–6, 7–6^{(7–5)}	1–6, 6–7^{(5–7)}		1–1	2–3 (40%)	22–30 (42%)	2

=== Bougainvillea group ===
		(United States) Vandeweghe	(Russia) Vesnina	(China) Peng	RR W–L	Set W–L	Game W–L	Standings
2	(United States) CoCo Vandeweghe		6–3, 6–2	3–6, 6–3, 6–2	2–0	4–1 (80%)	27–16 (63%)	1
6	(Russia) Elena Vesnina	3–6, 2–6		2–6, 0–1, ret.	0–2	0–4 (0%)	5–12 (29%)	3
12/WC	(China) Peng Shuai	6–3, 3–6, 2–6	6–2, 1–0, ret.		1–1	3–2 (60%)	11–15 (42%)	2

=== Camellia group ===
		(United States) Stephens	(Latvia) Sevastova	(Czech Republic) Strýcová	RR W–L	Set W–L	Game W–L	Standings
3	(United States) Sloane Stephens		5–7, 3–6	0–5, ret.	0–2	0–4 (0%)	8–13 (38%)	3
5	(Latvia) Anastasija Sevastova	7–5, 6–3		6–3, 6–4	2–0	4–0 (100%)	25–15 (63%)	1
11	(Czech Republic) Barbora Strýcová	5–0, ret.	3–6, 4–6		1–1	2–2 (50%)	7–12 (37%)	2

=== Rose group ===
		(Russia) Pavlyuchenkova	(Germany) Kerber	(Australia) Barty	RR W–L	Set W–L	Game W–L	Standings
4	(Russia) Anastasia Pavlyuchenkova		6–3, 3–6, 6–2	4–6, 1–6	1–1	2–3 (40%)	20–23 (47%)	2
8	(Germany) Angelique Kerber	3–6, 6–3, 2–6		3–6, 4–6	0–2	1–4 (20%)	18–27 (40%)	3
9	(Australia) Ashleigh Barty	6–4, 6–1	6–3, 6–4		2–0	4–0 (100%)	24–12 (67%)	1
