= 2018 WTA Elite Trophy – Doubles =

Doubles
- 2018 WTA Elite Trophy

Final
- Champions: (Ukraine) Lyudmyla Kichenok (Ukraine) Nadiia Kichenok
- Runners-up: (Japan) Shuko Aoyama (Belarus) Lidziya Marozava
- Score: 6–4, 3–6, [10–7]

Events
Singles	Doubles
← 2017 ·	WTA Elite Trophy	· 2019 →

Duan Yingying and Han Xinyun were the defending champions, but did not participate this year.

Lyudmyla and Nadiia Kichenok won the title, defeating Shuko Aoyama and Lidziya Marozava in the final, 6–4, 3–6, [10–7].

== Players ==
1. (Romania) Mihaela Buzărnescu / (Poland) Alicja Rosolska (round robin)
2. (Japan) Miyu Kato / (Japan) Makoto Ninomiya (round robin)
3. (Ukraine) Lyudmyla Kichenok / (Ukraine) Nadiia Kichenok (champions)
4. (Japan) Shuko Aoyama / (Belarus) Lidziya Marozava (final)
5. (China) Jiang Xinyu / (China) Yang Zhaoxuan (round robin)
6. (China) Tang Qianhui / (China) Xun Fangying (round robin)

== Draw ==
=== Key ===
- Q = Qualifier
- WC = Wild card
- LL = Lucky loser
- Alt = Alternate
- SE = Special exempt
- PR = Protected ranking
- ITF = ITF entry
- JE = Junior exempt
- w/o = Walkover
- r = Retired
- d = Defaulted
- SR = Special ranking

=== Final ===
Final
3	(Ukraine) Lyudmyla Kichenok (Ukraine) Nadiia Kichenok	6	3	[10]
4	(Japan) Shuko Aoyama (Belarus) Lidziya Marozava	4	6	[7]

=== Lily group ===
		(Romania) Buzărnescu (Poland) Rosolska	(Japan) Aoyama (Belarus) Marozava	(China) Tang (China) Xun	RR W–L	Set W–L	Game W–L	Standings
1	(Romania) Mihaela Buzărnescu (Poland) Alicja Rosolska		3–6, 2–6	6–2, 6–2	1–1	2–2 (50%)	17–16 (52%)	2
4	(Japan) Shuko Aoyama (Belarus) Lidziya Marozava	6–3, 6–2		6–3, 3–6, [6–10]	1–1	3–2 (60%)	21–15 (58%)	1
6/WC	(China) Tang Qianhui (China) Xun Fangying	2–6, 2–6	3–6, 6–3, [10–6]		1–1	2–3 (40%)	14–21 (40%)	3

=== Bougainvillea group ===
		(Japan) Kato (Japan) Ninomiya	(Ukraine) Kichenok (Ukraine) Kichenok	(China) Jiang (China) Yang	RR W–L	Set W–L	Game W–L	Standings
2	(Japan) Miyu Kato (Japan) Makoto Ninomiya		4–6, 6–1, [7–10]	3–6, 4–6	0–2	1–4 (20%)	17–20 (46%)	3
3	(Ukraine) Lyudmyla Kichenok (Ukraine) Nadiia Kichenok	6–4, 1–6, [10–7]		7–6^{(11–9)}, 3–6, [11–9]	2–0	4–2 (67%)	19–22 (46%)	1
5/WC	(China) Jiang Xinyu (China) Yang Zhaoxuan	6–3, 6–4	6–7^{(9–11)}, 6–3, [9–11]		1–1	3–2 (60%)	24–18 (57%)	2
