= 2017 WTA Elite Trophy – Doubles =

Doubles
- 2017 WTA Elite Trophy

Final
- Champions: (China) Duan Yingying (China) Han Xinyun
- Runners-up: (China) Lu Jingjing (China) Zhang Shuai
- Score: 6–2, 6–1

Events
Singles	Doubles
← 2016 ·	WTA Elite Trophy	· 2018 →

İpek Soylu and Xu Yifan were the defending champions, but did not participate this year.

Duan Yingying and Han Xinyun won the title, defeating Lu Jingjing and Zhang Shuai in the final 6–2, 6–1.

== Players ==
1. (Romania) Raluca Olaru / (Ukraine) Olga Savchuk (round robin)
2. (Poland) Alicja Rosolska / (United Kingdom) Anna Smith (round robin)
3. (China) Liang Chen / (China) Yang Zhaoxuan (round robin)
4. (China) Lu Jingjing / (China) Zhang Shuai (final)
5. (China) Jiang Xinyu / (China) Tang Qianhui (round robin)
6. (China) Duan Yingying / (China) Han Xinyun (champions)

== Draw ==
=== Key ===
- Q = Qualifier
- WC = Wild card
- LL = Lucky loser
- Alt = Alternate
- SE = Special exempt
- PR = Protected ranking
- ITF = ITF entry
- JE = Junior exempt
- w/o = Walkover
- r = Retired
- d = Defaulted
- SR = Special ranking

=== Final ===
Final
4	(China) Lu Jingjing (China) Zhang Shuai	2	1
6	(China) Duan Yingying (China) Han Xinyun	6	6

=== Lotus group ===
		(Romania) Olaru (Ukraine) Savchuk	(China) Liang (China) Yang	(China) Duan (China) Han	RR W–L	Set W–L	Game W–L	Standings
1	(Romania) Raluca Olaru (Ukraine) Olga Savchuk		6–3, 7–6^{(7–3)}	3–6, 7–5, [7–10]	1–1	3–2 (60%)	23–21 (52%)	2
3/WC	(China) Liang Chen (China) Yang Zhaoxuan	3–6, 6–7^{(3–7)}		6–7^{(2–7)},4–6	0–2	0–4 (0%)	19–26 (42%)	3
6	(China) Duan Yingying (China) Han Xinyun	6–3, 5–7, [10–7]	7–6^{(7–2)},6–4		2–0	4–1 (80%)	25–20 (56%)	1

=== Orchid group ===
		(Poland) Rosolska (United Kingdom) Smith	(China) Lu (China) Zhang	(China) Jiang (China) Tang	RR W–L	Set W–L	Game W–L	Standings
2	(Poland) Alicja Rosolska (United Kingdom) Anna Smith		3–6, 1–6	3–6, 6–4, [6–10]	0–2	1–4 (20%)	13–23 (36%)	3
4	(China) Lu Jingjing (China) Zhang Shuai	6–3, 6–1		7–6^{(7–3)}, 6–3	2–0	4–0 (100%)	25–13 (66%)	1
5/WC	(China) Jiang Xinyu (China) Tang Qianhui	6–3, 4–6, [10–6]	6–7^{(3–7)}, 3–6		1–1	2–3 (40%)	20–22 (48%)	2
