= 2016 WTA Elite Trophy – Doubles =

Doubles
- 2016 WTA Elite Trophy

Final
- Champions: (Turkey) İpek Soylu (China) Xu Yifan
- Runners-up: (China) Yang Zhaoxuan (China) You Xiaodi
- Score: 6–4, 3–6, [10–7]

Events
Singles	Doubles
← 2015 ·	WTA Elite Trophy	· 2017 →

Liang Chen and Wang Yafan were the defending champions, but were eliminated in the round-robin competition.

İpek Soylu and Xu Yifan won the title, defeating Yang Zhaoxuan and You Xiaodi in the final, 6–4, 3–6, [10–7].

== Players ==
1. (Slovenia) Andreja Klepač / (Spain) Arantxa Parra Santonja (round robin)
2. (Turkey) İpek Soylu / (China) Xu Yifan (champions)
3. (Australia) Anastasia Rodionova / (Ukraine) Olga Savchuk (round robin)
4. (Georgia (country)) Oksana Kalashnikova / (Germany) Tatjana Maria (round robin)
5. (China) Liang Chen / (China) Wang Yafan (round robin)
6. (China) Yang Zhaoxuan/ (China) You Xiaodi (final)

== Draw ==
=== Key ===
- Q = Qualifier
- WC = Wild card
- LL = Lucky loser
- Alt = Alternate
- SE = Special exempt
- PR = Protected ranking
- ITF = ITF entry
- JE = Junior exempt
- w/o = Walkover
- r = Retired
- d = Defaulted
- SR = Special ranking

=== Final ===
Final
6/WC	(China) Yang Zhaoxuan (China) You Xiaodi	4	6	[7]
2	(Turkey) İpek Soylu (China) Xu Yifan	6	3	[10]

=== Lotus group ===
		(Slovenia) Klepač (Spain) Parra Santonja	(Georgia (country)) Kalashnikova (Germany) Maria	(China) Yang (China) You	RR W–L	Set W–L	Game W–L	Standings
1	(Slovenia) Andreja Klepač (Spain) Arantxa Parra Santonja		6–1, 7–6^{(7–1)}	3–6, 3–6	1–1	2–2 (50%)	19–19 (50%)	2
4	(Georgia (country)) Oksana Kalashnikova (Germany) Tatjana Maria	1–6, 6–7^{(1–7)}		1–6, 7–6^{(7–3)}, [10–7]	1–1	2–3 (40%)	16–25 (39%)	3
6/WC	(China) Yang Zhaoxuan (China) You Xiaodi	6–3, 6–3	6–1, 6–7^{(3–7)}, [7–10]		1–1	3–2 (60%)	24–15(62%)	1

=== Orchid group ===
		(Turkey) Soylu (China) Xu	(Australia) Rodionova (Ukraine) Savchuk	(China) Liang (China) Wang	RR W–L	Set W–L	Game W–L	Standings
2	(Turkey) İpek Soylu (China) Xu Yifan		6–3, 6–4	6–4, 3–6, [10–6]	2–0	4–1 (80%)	22–17 (56%)	1
3	(Australia) Anastasia Rodionova (Ukraine) Olga Savchuk	3–6, 4–6		6–4, 7–5	1–1	2–2 (50%)	20–21 (49%)	2
5/WC	(China) Liang Chen (China) Wang Yafan	4–6, 6–3, [6–10]	4–6, 5–7		0–2	1–4 (20%)	19–23 (45%)	3
