= 2019 WTA Elite Trophy – Singles =

Singles
- 2019 WTA Elite Trophy

Final
- Champion: (Belarus) Aryna Sabalenka
- Runner-up: (Netherlands) Kiki Bertens
- Score: 6–4, 6–2

Events
Singles	Doubles
- WTA Elite Trophy

Ashleigh Barty was the defending champion, but did not participate this year as she had qualified for the WTA Finals.

Aryna Sabalenka won the title, defeating Kiki Bertens in the final, 6–4, 6–2.

== Players ==
1. (Netherlands) Kiki Bertens (final)
2. (United States) Sofia Kenin (round robin)
3. (United States) Madison Keys (round robin)
4. (Belarus) Aryna Sabalenka (champion)
5. (Croatia) Petra Martić (round robin)
6. (Belgium) Elise Mertens (round robin)
7. (United States) Alison Riske (round robin)
8. (Croatia) Donna Vekić (round robin)
9. (Greece) Maria Sakkari (round robin)
10. (Ukraine) Dayana Yastremska (round robin)
11. (Czech Republic) Karolína Muchová (semifinals)
12. (China) Zheng Saisai (semifinals)

== Alternates ==
1. (Latvia) Anastasija Sevastova (Did not play)
2. (Russia) Anastasia Pavlyuchenkova (Did not play)

== Draw ==
Key

- Q = Qualifier
- WC = Wild card
- LL = Lucky loser
- Alt = Alternate
- ITF = ITF entry
- PR = Protected ranking
- SR = Special ranking
- SE = Special exempt
- JE = Junior exempt
- JR = Junior Accelerator Programme entrant
- CO = College Accelerator Programme entrant
- NG = Next Gen Accelerator Program entrant
- w/o = Walkover
- r = Retired
- d = Defaulted

=== Finals ===
Semifinals
1	(Netherlands) Kiki Bertens	2	6	6
12/WC	(China) Zheng Saisai	6	3	4
11	(Czech Republic) Karolína Muchová	5	6^{4}
4	(Belarus) Aryna Sabalenka	7	7^{7}

Final
1	(Netherlands) Kiki Bertens	4	2
4	(Belarus) Aryna Sabalenka	6	6

=== Azalea group ===
		(Netherlands) Bertens	(Croatia) Vekić	(Ukraine) Yastremska	RR W–L	Set W–L	Game W–L	Standings
1	(Netherlands) Kiki Bertens		7–6^{(7–5)}, 6–2	6–4, 6–3	2–0	4–0 (100%)	25–15 (63%)	1
8	(Croatia) Donna Vekić	6–7^{(5–7)}, 2–6		6–7^{(6–8)}, 2–6	0–2	0–4 (0%)	16–26 (38%)	3
10	(Ukraine) Dayana Yastremska	4–6, 3–6	7–6^{(8–6)}, 6–2		1–1	2–2 (50%)	20–20 (50%)	2

=== Camellia group ===
		(United States) Kenin	(United States) Riske	(Czech Republic) Muchová	RR W–L	Set W–L	Game W–L	Standings
2	(United States) Sofia Kenin		6–4, 6–4	4–6, 6–4, 3–6	1–1	3–2 (60%)	25–24 (51%)	2
7	(United States) Alison Riske	4–6, 4–6		6–2, 2–6, 5–7	0–2	1–4 (20%)	21–27 (44%)	3
11	(Czech Republic) Karolína Muchová	6–4, 4–6, 6–3	2–6, 6–2, 7–5		2–0	4–2 (67%)	31–26 (54%)	1

=== Orchid group ===
		(United States) Keys	(Croatia) Martić	(China) Zheng	RR W–L	Set W–L	Game W–L	Standings
3	(United States) Madison Keys		6–3, 6–4	4–6, 2–6	1–1	2–2 (50%)	18–19 (49%)	3
5	(Croatia) Petra Martić	3–6, 4–6		6–4, 6–3	1–1	2–2 (50%)	19–19 (50%)	2
12/WC	(China) Zheng Saisai	6–4, 6–2	4–6, 3–6		1–1	2–2 (50%)	19–18 (51%)	1

=== Rose group ===
		(Belarus) Sabalenka	(Belgium) Mertens	(Greece) Sakkari	RR W–L	Set W–L	Game W–L	Standings
4	(Belarus) Aryna Sabalenka		6–4, 3–6, 7–5	6–3, 6–4	2–0	4–1 (80%)	28–22 (56%)	1
6	(Belgium) Elise Mertens	4–6, 6–3, 5–7		6–2, 3–6, 6–1	1–1	3–3 (50%)	30–25 (55%)	2
9	(Greece) Maria Sakkari	3–6, 4–6	2–6, 6–3, 1–6		0–2	1–4 (20%)	16–27 (37%)	3
