= 2020 WTA Elite Trophy =

- Date: 27 October – 1 November (cancelled)
- Edition: 6th
- Draw: 12S/6D
- Surface: Hard / Outdoor / Covered Court
- Location: Zhuhai, China
- Venue: Hengqin Tennis Center, Zhuhai

no Champions

Singles
- (Belarus) Aryna Sabalenka

Doubles
- (Ukraine) Lyudmyla Kichenok / (Slovenia) Andreja Klepač
WTA Elite Trophy

The 2020 WTA Elite Trophy was a women's tennis tournament to be played at the Hengqin International Tennis Center in Zhuhai, China. It was supposed to be the sixth edition of the singles event and doubles competition with 12 singles players and six doubles teams contesting the event. However, on 23 July 2020, the tournament was cancelled due to the decision by China's General Administration of Sport that China would not host any international sporting events in 2020 as a result of the COVID-19 pandemic.

== See also ==
- 2020 WTA Finals
- 2020 ATP Finals
- 2020 WTA Tour
