= WTA Elite Trophy =

Tournament information
- Founded: 2015
- Abolished: 2023
- Editions: 6
- Location: Zhuhai; China (2015–2019, 2023)
- Venue: Hengqin Tennis Center
- Category: WTA Elite Trophy
- Surface: Hard (outdoors)
- Draw: 12S / 6D
- Prize money: US$2,409,000 (2023)
- Website: wtaelitetrophy.com

Current champions (2023)
- Singles: (Brazil) Beatriz Haddad Maia
- Doubles: (Brazil) Beatriz Haddad Maia (Russia) Veronika Kudermetova

The WTA Elite Trophy (also known as the Huafa Technology WTA Elite Trophy for sponsorship reasons) was the second-tier year-end professional women's tennis tournament on the WTA Tour. It was the successor event of the different format WTA Tournament of Champions, which took place from 2009 to 2014. It took place at the end of each season, in two disciplines: singles and doubles. The singles event featured 12 players (11 of them ranked from 9th to 19th on the final table of the WTA ranking, and one wildcard). The players were split into four groups of three, with the group winners advancing to the single elimination semifinals. The doubles event featured six teams in two groups with the group winners contesting the final.

The inaugural edition was held in 2015, offering $2.15 million in prize money. Zhuhai, China hosted the WTA Elite Trophy for the first five years through 2019. The tournament then took a hiatus between 2020 and 2022 due to the COVID-19 pandemic and Peng Shuai controversy. In 2023, the event returned and was once again staged in Zhuhai. That year, Beatriz Haddad Maia made history as the first—and so far, only— player to have won both singles and doubles titles at the WTA Elite Trophy and also to do so in the same edition of the tournament.

== Venues ==
| Venue | Years | Stadium | Surface | Capacity |
|---|---|---|---|---|
| (China) Zhuhai | 2015–2019, 2023 | Hengqin International Tennis Center | Hard | 5,000 |

== Past results ==
=== Singles ===
| Venue | Year | Champion | Runner-up | Score |
|---|---|---|---|---|
| (China) Zhuhai | 2015 | (United States) Venus Williams | (Czech Republic) Karolína Plíšková | 7–5, 7–6^{(8–6)} |
| (China) Zhuhai | 2016 | (Czech Republic) Petra Kvitová | (Ukraine) Elina Svitolina | 6–4, 6–2 |
| (China) Zhuhai | 2017 | (Germany) Julia Görges | (United States) CoCo Vandeweghe | 7–5, 6–1 |
| (China) Zhuhai | 2018 | (Australia) Ashleigh Barty | (China) Wang Qiang | 6–3, 6–4 |
| (China) Zhuhai | 2019 | (Belarus) Aryna Sabalenka | (Netherlands) Kiki Bertens | 6–4, 6–2 |
| (China) Zhuhai | 2020 | no competition due to the COVID-19 pandemic | | |
| (China) Zhuhai | 2021 | cancelled | | |
| (China) Zhuhai | 2022 | not held | | |
| (China) Zhuhai | 2023 | (Brazil) Beatriz Haddad Maia | (China) Zheng Qinwen | 7–6^{(13–11)}, 7–6^{(7–4)} |

=== Doubles ===
| Venue | Year | Champions | Runners-up | Score |
|---|---|---|---|---|
| (China) Zhuhai | 2015 | (China) Liang Chen (China) Wang Yafan | (Spain) Anabel Medina Garrigues (Spain) Arantxa Parra Santonja | 6–4, 6–3 |
| (China) Zhuhai | 2016 | (Turkey) İpek Soylu (China) Xu Yifan | (China) Yang Zhaoxuan (China) You Xiaodi | 6–4, 3–6, [10–7] |
| (China) Zhuhai | 2017 | (China) Duan Yingying (China) Han Xinyun | (China) Lu Jingjing (China) Zhang Shuai | 6–2, 6–1 |
| (China) Zhuhai | 2018 | (Ukraine) Lyudmyla Kichenok (Ukraine) Nadiia Kichenok | (Japan) Shuko Aoyama (Belarus) Lidziya Marozava | 6–4, 3–6, [10–7] |
| (China) Zhuhai | 2019 | (Ukraine) Lyudmyla Kichenok (2) (Slovenia) Andreja Klepač | (China) Duan Yingying (China) Yang Zhaoxuan | 6–3, 6–3 |
| (China) Zhuhai | 2020 | no competition due to the COVID-19 pandemic | | |
| (China) Zhuhai | 2021 | cancelled | | |
| (China) Zhuhai | 2022 | not held | | |
| (China) Zhuhai | 2023 | (Brazil) Beatriz Haddad Maia; Veronika Kudermetova | (Japan) Miyu Kato (Indonesia) Aldila Sutjiadi | 6–3, 6–3 |

== See also ==
- WTA Finals
- WTA Tournament of Champions
