= 2016 WTA Elite Trophy – Singles =

Singles
- 2016 WTA Elite Trophy

Final
- Champion: (Czech Republic) Petra Kvitová
- Runner-up: (Ukraine) Elina Svitolina
- Score: 6–4, 6–2

Events
Singles	Doubles
- WTA Elite Trophy

Venus Williams was the defending champion, but she chose not to participate despite having qualified for this year's edition.

Petra Kvitová won the title, defeating Elina Svitolina in the final, 6–4, 6–2. Kvitová did not drop a set throughout the entire tournament.

Like Williams the year before, Kvitová has now won both the WTA Finals, in 2011, and WTA Elite Trophy, also becoming the first player to win both tournaments on her debut appearance.

== Players ==
1. (United Kingdom) Johanna Konta (semifinals)
2. (Spain) Carla Suárez Navarro (withdrew)
3. (Czech Republic) Petra Kvitová (champion)
4. (Ukraine) Elina Svitolina (final)
5. (Italy) Roberta Vinci (round robin)
6. (Switzerland) Timea Bacsinszky (round robin)
7. (Russia) Elena Vesnina (round robin)
8. (Australia) Samantha Stosur (round robin)
9. (Czech Republic) Barbora Strýcová (round robin)
10. (Netherlands) Kiki Bertens (round robin)
11. (France) Caroline Garcia (round robin)
12. (China) Zhang Shuai (semifinals)

== Alternate ==
1. (Hungary) Tímea Babos (replaced Suárez Navarro, round robin)

== Draw ==
Key

- Q = Qualifier
- WC = Wild card
- LL = Lucky loser
- Alt = Alternate
- ITF = ITF entry
- PR = Protected ranking
- SR = Special ranking
- SE = Special exempt
- JE = Junior exempt
- JR = Junior Accelerator Programme entrant
- CO = College Accelerator Programme entrant
- NG = Next Gen Accelerator Program entrant
- w/o = Walkover
- r = Retired
- d = Defaulted

=== Finals ===
Semifinals
1	(United Kingdom) Johanna Konta	6	1	4
4	(Ukraine) Elina Svitolina	2	6	6
12/WC	(China) Zhang Shuai	2	2
3	(Czech Republic) Petra Kvitová	6	6

Final
4	(Ukraine) Elina Svitolina	4	2
3	(Czech Republic) Petra Kvitová	6	6

=== Azalea group ===
		(United Kingdom) Konta	(Australia) Stosur	(France) Garcia	RR W–L	Set W–L	Game W–L	Standings
1	(United Kingdom) Johanna Konta		6–4, 6–2	6–2, 6–2	2–0	4–0 (100%)	24–10 (71%)	1
8	(Australia) Samantha Stosur	4–6, 2–6		4–6, 3–6	0–2	0–4 (0%)	13–24 (35%)	3
11	(France) Caroline Garcia	2–6, 2–6	6–4, 6–3		1–1	2–2 (50%)	16–19 (46%)	2

=== Camellia group ===
		(Hungary) Babos	(Switzerland) Bacsinszky	(China) Zhang	RR W–L	Set W–L	Game W–L	Standings
13/Alt	(Hungary) Tímea Babos		4–6, 2–6	6–7^{(2–7)}, 4–6	0–2	0–4 (0%)	16–25 (39%)	3
6	(Switzerland) Timea Bacsinszky	6–4, 6–2		1–6, 1–6	1–1	2–2 (50%)	14–18 (44%)	2
12/WC	(China) Zhang Shuai	7–6^{(7–2)}, 6–4	6–1, 6–1		2–0	4–0 (100%)	25–12 (68%)	1

=== Peony group ===
		(Czech Republic) Kvitová	(Italy) Vinci	(Czech Republic) Strýcová	RR W–L	Set W–L	Game W–L	Standings
3	(Czech Republic) Petra Kvitová		6–1, 6–2	6–1, 6–4	2–0	4–0 (100%)	24–8 (75%)	1
5	(Italy) Roberta Vinci	1–6, 2–6		4–6, 3–6	0–2	0–4 (0%)	10–24 (29%)	3
9	(Czech Republic) Barbora Strýcová	1–6, 4–6	6–4, 6–3		1–1	2–2 (50%)	17–19 (47%)	2

=== Rose group ===
		(Ukraine) Svitolina	(Russia) Vesnina	(Netherlands) Bertens	RR W–L	Set W–L	Game W–L	Standings
4	(Ukraine) Elina Svitolina		6–4, 6–2	2–6, 6–4, 6–2	2–0	4–1 (80%)	26–18 (59%)	1
7	(Russia) Elena Vesnina	4–6, 2–6		6–4, 7–6^{(7–5)}	1–1	2–2 (50%)	19–22 (46%)	2
10	(Netherlands) Kiki Bertens	6–2, 4–6, 2–6	4–6, 6–7^{(5–7)}		0–2	1–4 (20%)	22–27 (45%)	3
