= 2018 WTA Elite Trophy – Singles =

Singles
- 2018 WTA Elite Trophy

Final
- Champion: (Australia) Ashleigh Barty
- Runner-up: (China) Wang Qiang
- Score: 6–3, 6–4

Events
Singles	Doubles
- WTA Elite Trophy

Julia Görges was the defending champion, but she lost in the semifinals to Ashleigh Barty.

Barty went on to win the title, defeating Wang Qiang in the final, 6–3, 6–4.

== Players ==
1. (Russia) Daria Kasatkina (round robin)
2. (Latvia) Anastasija Sevastova (round robin)
3. (Belarus) Aryna Sabalenka (round robin)
4. (Belgium) Elise Mertens (round robin)
5. (Germany) Julia Görges (semifinals)
6. (United States) Madison Keys (semifinals, withdrew with a left knee injury)
7. (Spain) Garbiñe Muguruza (semifinals)
8. (France) Caroline Garcia (round robin)
9. (Australia) Ashleigh Barty (champion)
10. (Estonia) Anett Kontaveit (round robin)
11. (China) Wang Qiang (final)
12. (China) Zhang Shuai (round robin)

== Alternates ==
1. (Romania) Mihaela Buzărnescu (Did not play)
2. (Chinese Taipei) Hsieh Su-wei (Did not play)

== Draw ==
Key

- Q = Qualifier
- WC = Wild card
- LL = Lucky loser
- Alt = Alternate
- ITF = ITF entry
- PR = Protected ranking
- SR = Special ranking
- SE = Special exempt
- JE = Junior exempt
- JR = Junior Accelerator Programme entrant
- CO = College Accelerator Programme entrant
- NG = Next Gen Accelerator Program entrant
- w/o = Walkover
- r = Retired
- d = Defaulted

=== Finals ===
Semifinals
5	(Germany) Julia Görges	6	3	2
9	(Australia) Ashleigh Barty	4	6	6
7	(Spain) Garbiñe Muguruza	2	0
11	(China) Wang Qiang	6	6

Final
9	(Australia) Ashleigh Barty	6	6
11	(China) Wang Qiang	3	4

=== Azalea group ===
		(Russia) Kasatkina	(United States) Keys	(China) Wang	RR W–L	Set W–L	Game W–L	Standings
1	(Russia) Daria Kasatkina		2–6, 4–6	6–1, 2–6, 7–5	1–1	2–3 (40%)	21–24 (47%)	3
6	~~(United States) Madison Keys~~	~~6–2, 6–4~~		~~6–1, 3–6, 1–6~~	~~1–1~~	~~3–2 (60%)~~	~~22–19 (54%)~~	~~1~~
11	(China) Wang Qiang	1–6, 6–2, 5–7	1–6, 6–3, 6–1		1–1	3–3 (50%)	25–25 (50%)	2

=== Camellia group ===
		(Latvia) Sevastova	(Spain) Muguruza	(China) Zhang	RR W–L	Set W–L	Game W–L	Standings
2	(Latvia) Anastasija Sevastova		7–6^{(7–4)}, 2–6, 6–7^{(1–7)}	6–0, 7–6^{(12–10)}	1–1	3–2 (60%)	28–25 (53%)	2
7	(Spain) Garbiñe Muguruza	6–7^{(4–7)}, 6–2, 7–6^{(7–1)}		3–6, 6–3, 6–2	2–0	4–2 (67%)	34–26 (57%)	1
12/WC	(China) Zhang Shuai	0–6, 6–7^{(10–12)}	6–3, 3–6, 2–6		0–2	1–4 (20%)	17–28 (38%)	3

=== Orchid group ===
		(Belarus) Sabalenka	(France) Garcia	(Australia) Barty	RR W–L	Set W–L	Game W–L	Standings
3	(Belarus) Aryna Sabalenka		4–6, 4–6	6–4, 6–4	1–1	2–2 (50%)	20–20 (50%)	2
8	(France) Caroline Garcia	6–4, 6–4		3–6, 4–6	1–1	2–2 (50%)	19–20 (49%)	3
9	(Australia) Ashleigh Barty	4–6, 4–6	6–3, 6–4		1–1	2–2 (50%)	20–19 (51%)	1

=== Rose group ===
		(Belgium) Mertens	(Germany) Görges	(Estonia) Kontaveit	RR W–L	Set W–L	Game W–L	Standings
4	(Belgium) Elise Mertens		2–6, 6–7^{(5–7)}	6–3, 6–1	1–1	2–2 (50%)	20–17 (54%)	2
5	(Germany) Julia Görges	6–2, 7–6^{(7–5)}		2–6, 6–4, 4–6	1–1	3–2 (60%)	25–24 (51%)	1
10	(Estonia) Anett Kontaveit	3–6, 1–6	6–2, 4–6, 6–4		1–1	2–3 (40%)	20–24 (45%)	3
