= Yang Zhaoxuan =

Chinese tennis player (born 1995)

Yang Zhaoxuan 杨钊煊
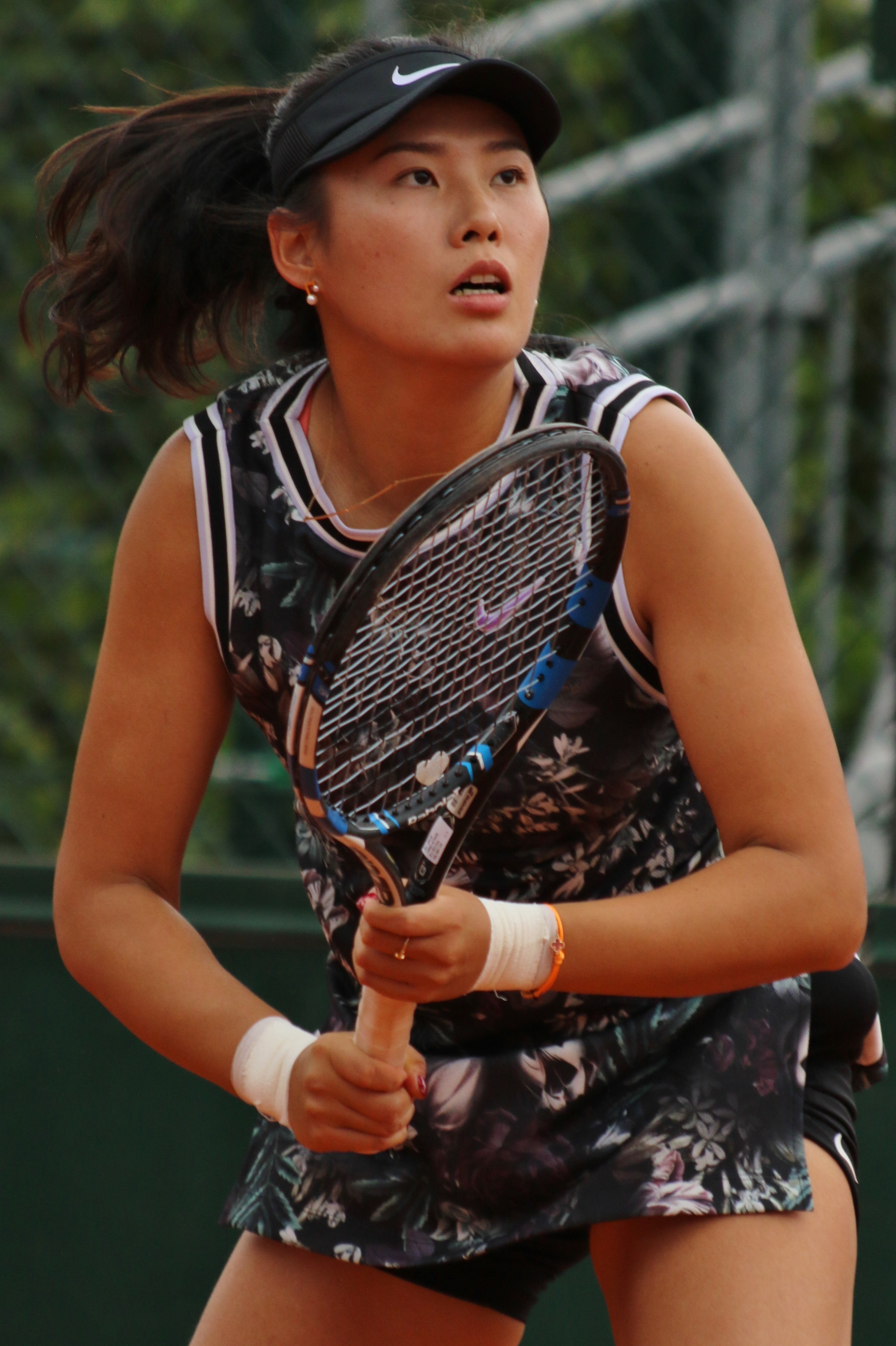
- Yang at the 2019 French Open
- Country (sports): China
- Residence: Beijing, China
- Born: 11 February 1995 (age 31) Beijing
- Height: 1.76 m (5 ft 9 in)
- Plays: Right (two-handed backhand)
- Prize money: $2,160,889

Singles
- Career record: 138–135
- Career titles: 0 WTA, 3 ITF
- Highest ranking: No. 151 (14 September 2015)

Grand Slam singles results
- Australian Open: Q2 (2016)
- French Open: Q1 (2016)
- Wimbledon: Q3 (2015)
- US Open: Q2 (2015)

Doubles
- Career record: 341–257
- Career titles: 7
- Highest ranking: No. 9 (30 January 2023)
- Current ranking: No. 77 (12 October 2026)

Grand Slam doubles results
- Australian Open: QF (2023)
- French Open: SF (2018)
- Wimbledon: 3R (2022)
- US Open: 3R (2017, 2022, 2025)

Other doubles tournaments
- Tour Finals: RR (2022)
- Olympic Games: 2R (2021)

Grand Slam mixed doubles results
- Australian Open: 1R (2023)
- Wimbledon: SF (2019)
- US Open: 2R (2023)

Team competitions
- Fed Cup: 15–5
Medal record
Representing China
Women's Tennis
Asian Games
Gold medal – first place	2018 Jakarta	Doubles
- Last updated on: 18 October 2026.

Yang Zhaoxuan (Chinese: 杨钊煊; pinyin: Yáng Zhāoxuān; Mandarin pronunciation: [jǎŋ ʈʂáʊ ɕɥɛ́n]; born 11 February 1995) is a Chinese tennis player. She reached her career-high WTA doubles ranking of No. 9 on 30 January 2023.

Yang has won seven doubles titles on the WTA Tour and one WTA Challenger doubles title. In September 2015, she reached her best singles ranking of world No. 151. In addition, she has won three singles and twelve doubles titles on the ITF Circuit.

== Career ==
=== 2014: WTA Tour debut ===
Yang made her WTA Tour debut at the 2014 Shenzhen Open, partnering Ye Qiuyu in doubles. The pair lost their first-round match against third seeds Irina Buryachok and Oksana Kalashnikova.

=== 2017: First WTA 1000 final ===
Alongside Shuko Aoyama, she reached the final of the Wuhan Open which they lost to Latisha Chan and Martina Hingis. At the WTA Elite Trophy, she lost both matches in the round-robin stage together with Han Xinyun.

=== 2018: First major semifinal ===
At the French Open, Yang alongside Chan Hao-ching reached her first major semifinal but then lost to Eri Hozumi and Makoto Ninomiya.

=== 2019: Mixed doubles semifinal ===
At the Wimbledon Championships, she reached the round of the last four in mixed doubles alongside Matwé Middelkoop, after overcoming the top-seeded couple of Nicole Melichar and Bruno Soares. They lost their semifinal match to Jeļena Ostapenko and Robert Lindstedt.

=== 2021: Second WTA 1000 final ===
In March, Yang reached the final of the Dubai Tennis Championships along with Xu Yifan but they were defeatet by Alexa Guarachi and Darija Jurak.

=== 2022: WTA 1000 title and WTA Finals ===
At the WTA 1000 Indian Wells Open, she won the biggest title of her career in doubles with Xu Yifan. They also took the title at the Silicon Valley Classic She qualified for the 2022 WTA Finals with partner Xu Yifan.

=== 2023: Top 10 debut, major quarterfinal ===
She reached her first Grand Slam tournament quarterfinal outside of Paris at the Australian Open, partnering with Chan Hao-ching. As a result, she recorded a new career-high ranking of world No. 9, on 30 January 2023.

== Performance timeline ==
Key
W	F	SF	QF	#R	RR	Q#	DNQ	A	NH

(W) winner; (F) finalist; (SF) semifinalist; (QF) quarterfinalist; (#R) rounds 4, 3, 2, 1; (RR) round-robin stage; (Q#) qualification round; (DNQ) did not qualify; (A) absent; (NH) not held; (SR) strike rate (events won / competed); (W–L) win–loss record.
To avoid confusion and double counting, these charts are updated at the conclusion of a tournament or when the player's participation has ended.

Only main-draw results in WTA Tour, Grand Slam tournaments, Fed Cup/Billie Jean King Cup and Olympic Games are included in win–loss records.

=== Doubles ===
Current through the 2025 Dubai Open.

Tournament	2013	2014	2015	2016	2017	2018	2019	2020	2021	2022	2023	...	2025	SR	W–L	Win %
Grand Slam tournaments
Australian Open	A	A	1R	A	3R	3R	1R	1R	2R	3R	QF		2R	0 / 9	11–9	55%
French Open	A	A	A	A	1R	SF	2R	A	2R	QF	3R		A	0 / 6	11–6	65%
Wimbledon	A	A	A	Q2	2R	2R	1R	NH	A	3R	2R		1R	0 / 6	5–6	45%
US Open	A	A	A	1R	3R	2R	2R	A	A	3R	2R		3R	0 / 7	9–7	56%
Win–Loss	0–0	0–0	0–1	0–1	5–4	8–4	2–4	0–1	2–2	9–4	7–4		3–3	0 / 28	36–28	56%
Year-end championships
WTA Finals	DNQ/NH									RR	DNQ			0 / 1	1–2	33%
Elite Trophy	DNQ			F	RR	RR	F	NH			DNQ		NH	0 / 6	4–6	40%
National representation
Summer Olympics	NH			A	NH				2R	NH			NH	0 / 1	1–1	50%
WTA 1000
Dubai / Qatar Open (Note: The first Premier 5 event of the year has switched back and forth between the Dubai Tennis Championships and the Qatar Ladies Open since 2009. Dubai was classified as a Premier 5 event from 2009 to 2011, before being succeeded by Doha for the 2012–2014 period. In 2015, Dubai regained its Premier 5 status while Doha was demoted to Premier status. The Premier 5 tournaments were reclassified as WTA 1000 tournaments in 2021.)	A	A	A	A	1R	2R	1R	2R	F	A	QF		SF	0 / 7	11–7	61%
Indian Wells Open	A	A	A	A	QF	2R	2R	NH	A	W	1R		2R	0 / 6	10–5	67%
Miami Open	A	A	A	A	2R	2R	2R	NH	2R	SF	2R		2R	0 / 7	9–7	56%
Madrid Open	A	A	A	A	A	2R	1R	NH	1R	1R	2R		A	0 / 5	2–5	29%
Italian Open	A	A	A	A	A	2R	2R	A	1R	QF	1R		A	0 / 5	4–5	44%
Canadian Open	A	A	A	A	A	2R (Note: Withdrew during the tournament.)	2R	NH	A	2R	SF		1R	0 / 5	6–3	67%
Cincinnati Open	A	A	A	A	A	A	1R	A	A	2R	1R		1R	0 / 4	1–4	20%
Wuhan Open	A	1R	1R	1R	F	1R	SF	NH					A	0 / 6	6–6	50%
China Open	A	A	1R	1R	1R	1R	1R	NH			A		2R	0 / 6	1–6	14%
Guadalajara Open	NH									SF	1R		A	0 / 2	3–2	60%
Career statistics
Tournaments	1	4	10	12	19	23	27	5	13	23	25			Career total: 162		
Titles	0	0	0	1	1	1	1	0	0	2	1			Career total: 7		
Finals	0	0	0	4	3	1	2	0	2	2	1			Career total: 15		
Overall win-loss	0–1	0–4	4–10	14–12	24–19	21–21	27–25	4–5	16–13	33–31	26–24			6 / 163	169–165	51%
Year-end ranking	362	465	112	60	28	28	36	55	48	12	32		44	$2,160,889		

== Significant finals ==
=== WTA Elite Trophy ===
==== Doubles: 2 (runner-ups) ====
Result	Year	Location	Surface	Partner	Opponents	Score
Loss	2016	Zhuhai, China	Hard (i)	(China) You Xiaodi	(Turkey) İpek Soylu (China) Xu Yifan	4–6, 6–3, [7–10]
Loss	2019	Zhuhai, China	Hard (i)	(China) Duan Yingying	(Ukraine) Lyudmyla Kichenok (Slovenia) Andreja Klepač	3–6, 3–6

=== WTA 1000 tournaments ===
==== Doubles: 3 (1 title, 2 runner-ups) ====
Result	Year	Tournament	Surface	Partner	Opponents	Score
Loss	2017	Wuhan Open	Hard	(Japan) Shuko Aoyama	(Chinese Taipei) Chan Yung-jan (Switzerland) Martina Hingis	6–7^{(5–7)}, 6–3, [4–10]
Loss	2021	Dubai Championships	Hard	(China) Xu Yifan	(Chile) Alexa Guarachi (Croatia) Darija Jurak	0–6, 3–6
Win	2022	Indian Wells Open	Hard	(China) Xu Yifan	(United States) Asia Muhammad (Japan) Ena Shibahara	7–5, 7–6^{(7–4)}

== WTA Tour finals ==
=== Doubles: 16 (7 titles, 9 runner-ups) ===
Legend Elite Trophy (0–2) WTA 1000 (1–2) WTA 500 (2–1) WTA 250 (4–4)	Finals by surface Hard (6–7) Clay (1–1) Grass (0–1)

Result	W–L	Date	Tournament	Tier	Surface	Partner	Opponents	Score
Win	1–0	Feb 2016	Malaysian Open	International (Note: The WTA International tournaments were reclassified as WTA 250 tournaments in 2021.)	Hard	(Thailand) Varatchaya Wongteanchai	(China) Liang Chen (China) Wang Yafan	4–6, 6–4, [10–7]
Loss	1–1	Jun 2016	Nottingham Open, UK	International	Grass	(Canada) Gabriela Dabrowski	(Czech Republic) Andrea Hlaváčková (China) Peng Shuai	5–7, 6–3, [7–10]
Loss	1–2	Sep 2016	Pan Pacific Open, Japan	Premier (Note: The WTA Premier tournaments were reclassified as WTA 500 tournaments in 2021.)	Hard	(China) Liang Chen	(India) Sania Mirza (Czech Republic) Barbora Strýcová	1–6, 1–6
Loss	1–3	Nov 2016	WTA Elite Trophy, China	Elite	Hard	(China) You Xiaodi	(Turkey) İpek Soylu (China) Xu Yifan	4–6, 6–3, [7–10]
Loss	1–4	Jan 2017	Hobart International, Australia	International	Hard	(Canada) Gabriela Dabrowski	(Romania) Raluca Olaru (Ukraine) Olga Savchuk	6–0, 4–6, [5–10]
Win	2–4	Sep 2017	Japan Women's Open	International	Hard	(Japan) Shuko Aoyama	(Australia) Monique Adamczak (Australia) Storm Sanders	6–0, 2–6, [10–5]
Loss	2–5	Sep 2017	Wuhan Open, China	Premier 5 (Note: The WTA Premier 5 & Mandatory tournaments were reclassified as WTA 1000 tournaments in 2021.)	Hard	(Japan) Shuko Aoyama	(Chinese Taipei) Chan Yung-jan (Switzerland) Martina Hingis	6–7^{(5–7)}, 6–3, [4–10]
Win	3–5	Feb 2018	Dubai Championships, U.A.E.	Premier	Hard	(Chinese Taipei) Chan Hao-ching	(Chinese Taipei) Hsieh Su-wei (China) Peng Shuai	4–6, 6–2, [10–6]
Win	4–5	Jan 2019	Shenzhen Open, China	International	Hard	(China) Peng Shuai	(China) Duan Yingying (Czech Republic) Renata Voráčová	6–4, 6–3
Loss	4–6	Oct 2019	WTA Elite Trophy, China	Elite	Hard	(China) Duan Yingying	(Ukraine) Lyudmyla Kichenok (Slovenia) Andreja Klepač	3–6, 3–6
Loss	4–7	Mar 2021	Dubai Championships, UAE	WTA 1000	Hard	(China) Xu Yifan	(Chile) Alexa Guarachi (Croatia) Darija Jurak	0–6, 3–6
Loss	4–8	May 2021	Internationaux de Strasbourg, France	WTA 250	Clay	(Japan) Makoto Ninomiya	(Chile) Alexa Guarachi (United States) Desirae Krawczyk	2–6, 3–6
Win	5–8	Mar 2022	Indian Wells Open, United States	WTA 1000	Hard	(China) Xu Yifan	(United States) Asia Muhammad (Japan) Ena Shibahara	7–5, 7–6^{(7–4)}
Win	6–8	Aug 2022	Silicon Valley Classic, United States	WTA 500	Hard	(China) Xu Yifan	(Japan) Shuko Aoyama (Chinese Taipei) Chan Hao-ching	7–5, 6–0
Win	7–8	May 2023	Internationaux de Strasbourg, France	WTA 250	Clay	(China) Xu Yifan	(United States) Desirae Krawczyk (Mexico) Giuliana Olmos	6–3, 6–2
Loss	7–9	Jan 2026	Auckland Open, New Zealand	WTA 250	Hard	(China) Xu Yifan	(France) Kristina Mladenovic (China) Guo Hanyu	6–7^{(7–9)}, 1–6

== WTA 125 finals ==
=== Doubles: 2 (1 title, 1 runner-up) ===
Result	W–L	Date	Tournament	Surface	Partner	Opponents	Score
Loss	0–1	Nov 2015	Hua Hin Challenger, Thailand	Hard	(Thailand) Varatchaya Wongteanchai	(China) Liang Chen (China) Wang Yafan	3–6, 4–6
Win	1–1	Apr 2019	Kunming Open, China	Clay	(China) Peng Shuai	(China) Duan Yingying (China) Han Xinyun	7–5, 6–2

== ITF Circuit finals ==
=== Singles: 4 (3 titles, 1 runner-up) ===
Legend $25,000 tournaments (0–1) $10,000 tournaments (3–0)	Finals by surface Hard (3–1) Clay (0–0)

Result	W–L	Date	Tournament	Tier	Surface	Opponent	Score
Win	1–0	Jun 2011	ITF New Delhi, India	10,000	Hard	(South Korea) Kim Hae-sung	6–2, 6–0
Win	2–0	Aug 2014	ITF Istanbul, Turkey	10,000	Hard	(Turkey) İpek Soylu	7–6^{(7–4)}, 6–1
Win	3–0	Dec 2014	ITF Hong Kong, China	10,000	Hard	(China) Zhu Lin	6–4, 6–4
Loss	3–1	Apr 2015	Pingshan Open, China	25,000	Hard	(Chinese Taipei) Hsieh Su-wei	2–6, 2–6

=== Doubles: 24 (12 titles, 12 runner-ups) ===
Legend $100,000 tournaments (2–3) $75,000 tournaments (0–1) $50,000 tournaments (3–3) $25,000 tournaments (2–2) $10,000 tournaments (5–3)	Finals by surface Hard (8–10) Clay (1–2) Grass (3–0)

Result	W–L	Date	Tournament	Tier	Surface	Partner	Opponents	Score
Win	1–0	Apr 2010	ITF Ningbo, China	10,000	Hard	(China) Wang Yafan	(China) Lu Jiaxiang (China) Yang Zijun	1–6, 6–2, [10–4]
Win	2–0	Nov 2010	ITF Manila, Philippines	10,000	Hard	(China) Zhu Lin	(South Korea) Kim Ji-young (South Korea) Kim Jin-hee	6–4, 6–7^{(5)}, [10–7]
Win	3–0	Feb 2012	ITF Antalya, Turkey	10,000	Clay	(China) Zhang Kailin	(China) Li Yihong (China) Tang Haochen	7–6^{(6)}, 5–7, [10–8]
Loss	3–1	May 2012	ITF Changwon, South Korea	25,000	Hard	(China) Zhang Kailin	(China) Liu Wanting (China) Xu Yifan	4–6, 5–7
Loss	3–2	Oct 2012	Suzhou Ladies Open, China	100,000	Hard	(China) Zhao Yijing	(Switzerland) Timea Bacsinszky (France) Caroline Garcia	5–7, 3–6
Win	4–2	Apr 2013	ITF Seoul, South Korea	15,000	Hard	(China) Liu Wanting	(Chinese Taipei) Chan Chin-wei (China) Zhang Nannan	6–2, 6–2
Loss	4–3	Sep 2013	ITF Sanya, China	50,000	Hard	(China) Zhao Yijing	(China) Sun Ziyue (China) Xu Shilin	7–6^{(5)}, 3–6, [3–10]
Loss	4–4	Feb 2014	ITF Antalya, Turkey	10,000	Clay	(China) Li Yihong	(Austria) Pia König (Georgia (country)) Sofia Kvatsabaia	1–2 ret.
Loss	4–5	Jun 2014	ITF Xi'an, China	50,000	Hard	(China) Liang Chen	(China) Lu Jiajing (China) Wang Yafan	3–6, 6–7^{(2)}
Loss	4–6	Aug 2014	ITF Istanbul, Turkey	10,000	Hard	(China) Gao Xinyu	(China) Wang Yan (China) You Xiaodi	w/o
Loss	4–7	Aug 2014	ITF Antalya, Turkey	10,000	Hard	(China) Wang Yan	(Ukraine) Alona Fomina (Germany) Christina Shakovets	3–6, 1–6
Win	5–7	Dec 2014	ITF Hong Kong	10,000	Hard	(China) Ye Qiuyu	(South Korea) Hong Seung-yeon (South Korea) Kang Seo-kyung	6–4, 6–3
Loss	5–8	Feb 2015	Launceston International, Australia	50,000	Hard	(China) Wang Yafan	(China) Han Xinyun (Japan) Junri Namigata	4–6, 6–3, [6–10]
Win	6–8	Feb 2015	ITF New Delhi, India	25,000	Hard	(China) Tang Haochen	(Chinese Taipei) Hsu Ching-wen (Chinese Taipei) Lee Pei-chi	7–5, 6–1
Loss	6–9	Apr 2015	ITF Nanjing, China	25,000	Hard	(China) Ye Qiuyu	(China) Liu Chang (China) Lu Jiajing	6–1, 1–6, [8–10]
Loss	6–10	May 2015	Anning Open, China	75,000	Hard	(China) Ye Qiuyu	(China) Xu Yifan (China) Zheng Saisai	5–7, 2–6
Win	7–10	Oct 2015	Suzhou Ladies Open, China	50,000	Hard	(China) Zhang Yuxuan	(China) Tian Ran (China) Zhang Kailin	7–6^{(4)}, 6–2
Win	8–10	Apr 2016	ITF Kashiwa, Japan	25,000	Hard	(China) Zhang Kailin	(China) You Xiaodi (China) Zhu Lin	7–5, 2–6, [11–9]
Loss	8–11	May 2016	Kunming Open, China	100,000	Clay	(Thailand) Varatchaya Wongteanchai	(China) Wang Yafan (China) Zhang Kailin	7–6^{(3)}, 6–7^{(2)}, [1–10]
Win	9–11	May 2016	Eastbourne Trophy, UK	50,000	Grass	(China) Zhang Kailin	(United States) Asia Muhammad (United States) Maria Sanchez	7–6^{(5)}, 6–1
Win	10–11	Jun 2016	Ilkley Trophy, UK	50,000	Grass	(China) Zhang Kailin	(Belgium) An-Sophie Mestach (Australia) Storm Sanders	6–3, 7–6^{(5)}
Win	11–11	Jun 2017	Southsea Trophy, UK	100,000+H	Grass	(Japan) Shuko Aoyama	(Switzerland) Viktorija Golubic (Ukraine) Lyudmyla Kichenok	6–7^{(7)}, 6–3, [10–8]
Loss	11–12	Nov 2017	Shenzhen Longhua Open, China	100,000	Hard	(Japan) Shuko Aoyama	(United States) Jacqueline Cako (Serbia) Nina Stojanović	4–6, 2–6
Win	12–12	Nov 2018	Shenzhen Longhua Open, China	100,000	Hard	(Japan) Shuko Aoyama	(South Korea) Choi Ji-hee (Thailand) Luksika Kumkhum	6–2, 6–3
