= 2017 Wuhan Open – Doubles =

Doubles
- 2017 Wuhan Open

Final
- Champions: (Chinese Taipei) Chan Yung-jan (Switzerland) Martina Hingis
- Runners-up: (Japan) Shuko Aoyama (China) Yang Zhaoxuan
- Score: 7–6^{(7–5)}, 3–6, [10–4]

Details
- Draw: 28
- Seeds: 8

Events
Singles	Doubles
- Wuhan Open

Bethanie Mattek-Sands and Lucie Šafářová were the defending champions, but neither player could participate this year due to injury.

Chan Yung-jan and Martina Hingis won the title, defeating Shuko Aoyama and Yang Zhaoxuan in the final, 7–6^{(7–5)}, 3–6, [10–4].

As a result of Šafářová's withdrawal, Hingis regained the WTA no. 1 doubles ranking at the conclusion of the tournament.

== Seeds ==
The top four seeds received a bye into the second round.

1. (Chinese Taipei) Chan Yung-jan / (Switzerland) Martina Hingis (champions)
2. (Russia) Ekaterina Makarova / (Russia) Elena Vesnina (quarterfinals, retired)
3. (India) Sania Mirza / (China) Peng Shuai (semifinals)
4. (Australia) Ashleigh Barty / (Australia) Casey Dellacqua (semifinals, withdrew)
5. (Canada) Gabriela Dabrowski / (China) Xu Yifan (quarterfinals)
6. (Germany) Anna-Lena Grönefeld / (Czech Republic) Květa Peschke (quarterfinals)
7. (Poland) Alicja Rosolska / (United States) Abigail Spears (quarterfinals)
8. (France) Kristina Mladenovic / (Russia) Anastasia Pavlyuchenkova (withdrew)

== Draw ==
Key

- Q = Qualifier
- WC = Wild card
- LL = Lucky loser
- Alt = Alternate
- ITF = ITF entry
- PR = Protected ranking
- SR = Special ranking
- SE = Special exempt
- JE = Junior exempt
- JR = Junior Accelerator Programme entrant
- CO = College Accelerator Programme entrant
- NG = Next Gen Accelerator Program entrant
- w/o = Walkover
- r = Retired
- d = Defaulted

=== Finals ===
Semifinals
1	(Chinese Taipei) Chan Yung-jan (Switzerland) Martina Hingis	7^{7}	6
3	(India) Sania Mirza (China) Peng Shuai	6^{5}	4
4	(Australia) Ashleigh Barty (Australia) Casey Dellacqua
(Japan) Shuko Aoyama (China) Yang Zhaoxuan	w/o

Final
1	(Chinese Taipei) Chan Yung-jan (Switzerland) Martina Hingis	7^{7}	3	[10]
(Japan) Shuko Aoyama (China) Yang Zhaoxuan	6^{5}	6	[4]

=== Top half ===
First round
(Ukraine) L Kichenok (Romania) R Olaru	2	7^{7}	[7]
(United States) R Atawo (Croatia) D Jurak	6	6^{5}	[10]
(Chinese Taipei) H-c Chan (China) S Zhang	4	4
(Japan) M Ninomiya (Czech Republic) R Voráčová	6	6
(Ukraine) O Savchuk (Slovenia) K Srebotnik	6	6^{6}	[4]
6	(Germany) A-L Grönefeld (Czech Republic) K Peschke	1	7^{8}	[10]
(Latvia) A Sevastova (Croatia) D Vekić	2	7^{7}	[10]
(Netherlands) K Bertens (Germany) J Görges	6	6^{4}	[6]
WC	(China) S Guo (China) Q Ye	2	0
(Russia) D Kasatkina (Czech Republic) K Siniaková	6	6
(Belgium) E Mertens (Netherlands) D Schuurs	7	3	[8]
7	(Poland) A Rosolska (United States) A Spears	5	6	[10]

Second round
1	(Chinese Taipei) Y-j Chan (Switzerland) M Hingis	6	6
(United States) R Atawo (Croatia) D Jurak	1	2
(Japan) M Ninomiya (Czech Republic) R Voráčová	0	2
6	(Germany) A-L Grönefeld (Czech Republic) K Peschke	6	6
3	(India) S Mirza (China) S Peng	6	7^{7}
(Latvia) A Sevastova (Croatia) D Vekić	1	6^{4}
(Russia) D Kasatkina (Czech Republic) K Siniaková	1	5
7	(Poland) A Rosolska (United States) A Spears	6	7

Quarterfinals
1	(Chinese Taipei) Y-j Chan (Switzerland) M Hingis	6	6
6	(Germany) A-L Grönefeld (Czech Republic) K Peschke	1	0
3	(India) S Mirza (China) S Peng	3	6	[10]
7	(Poland) A Rosolska (United States) A Spears	6	3	[5]

Semifinals
1	(Chinese Taipei) Y-j Chan (Switzerland) M Hingis	7^{7}	6
3	(India) S Mirza (China) S Peng	6^{5}	4

=== Bottom half ===
First round
5	(Canada) G Dabrowski (China) Y Xu	7^{9}	3
WC	(China) Q Wang (China) Y Wang	6^{7}	1^{r}
(United States) N Melichar (United Kingdom) A Smith	6	6
(Australia) D Gavrilova (Czech Republic) B Strýcová	3	3
(Slovenia) A Klepač (Spain) MJ Martínez Sánchez	6	6
(Chinese Taipei) C-j Chuang (China) C Liang	1	4
8	(France) K Mladenovic (Russia) A Pavlyuchenkova
(Ukraine) N Kichenok (Australia) An Rodionova	w/o
(United States) L Davis (United States) A Riske	1	0
(Japan) S Aoyama (China) Z Yang	6	6
(Romania) S Cîrstea (Latvia) J Ostapenko
Alt	(Germany) M Barthel (Germany) C Witthöft	w/o

Second round
5	(Canada) G Dabrowski (China) Y Xu	6^{3}	6	[11]
(United States) N Melichar (United Kingdom) A Smith	7^{7}	4	[9]
(Slovenia) A Klepač (Spain) MJ Martínez Sánchez	6^{4}	6	[5]
4	(Australia) A Barty (Australia) C Dellacqua	7^{7}	3	[10]
(Ukraine) N Kichenok (Australia) An Rodionova	2	5
(Japan) S Aoyama (China) Z Yang	6	7
Alt	(Germany) M Barthel (Germany) C Witthöft	7^{7}	1^{r}
2	(Russia) E Makarova (Russia) E Vesnina	6^{4}	3

Quarterfinals
5	(Canada) G Dabrowski (China) Y Xu	3	4
4	(Australia) A Barty (Australia) C Dellacqua	6	6
(Japan) S Aoyama (China) Z Yang	4
2	(Russia) E Makarova (Russia) E Vesnina	3^{r}

Semifinals
4	(Australia) A Barty (Australia) C Dellacqua
(Japan) S Aoyama (China) Z Yang	w/o
