= Lidziya Marozava =

Belarusian tennis player (born 1992)

Lidziya Marozava Лідзія Марозава
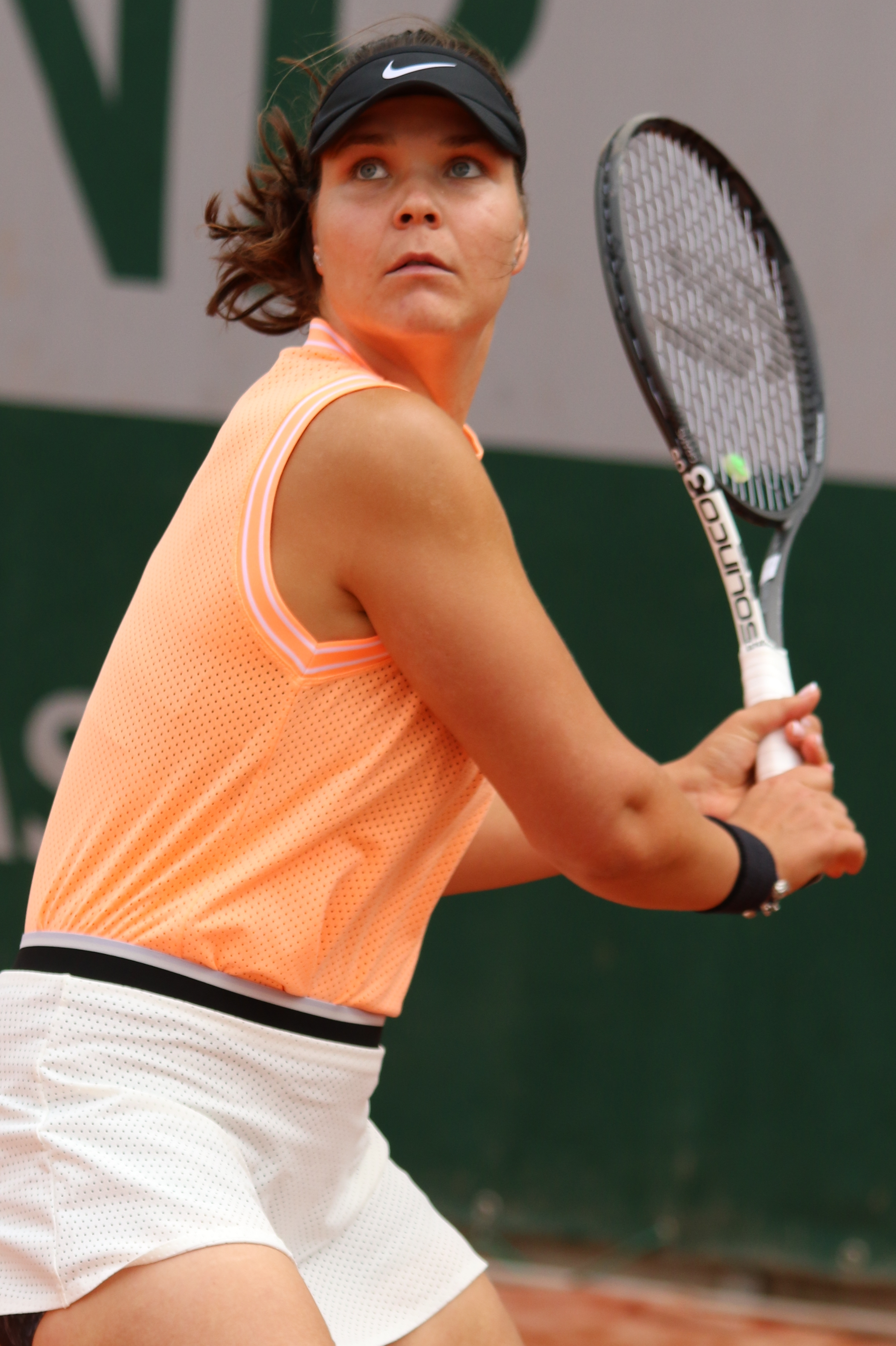
- Marozava at the 2019 French Open
- Full name: Lidziya Aleksandrovna Marozava
- Country (sports): Belarus
- Born: 8 October 1992 (age 34) Minsk, Belarus
- Height: 1.83 m (6 ft 0 in)
- Turned pro: 2009
- Retired: 2026
- Plays: Right-handed
- Prize money: $677,348

Singles
- Career record: 144–157
- Career titles: 1 ITF
- Highest ranking: No. 468 (25 September 2017)

Doubles
- Career record: 339–309
- Career titles: 4 WTA, 2 WTA 125
- Highest ranking: No. 37 (1 October 2018)

Grand Slam doubles results
- Australian Open: 2R (2018, 2019)
- French Open: 2R (2022)
- Wimbledon: 3R (2023)
- US Open: 2R (2018, 2022)

Team competitions
- Fed Cup: 4–3
Medal record
Representing Belarus
Summer Universiade
Gold medal – first place	2015 Gwangju	mixed doubles

Lidziya Marozava (Belarusian: Лідзія Аляксандраўна Марозава, Lidziya Aliaksandrauna Marozava; Russian: Лидия Александровна Морозова, Lidiya Aleksandrovna Morozova; born 8 October 1992) is a former professional tennis player from Belarus who had specialized in doubles.

== Career ==
On 1 October 2018, Marozava reached her career-high of No. 37 in the WTA doubles rankings. She won four doubles titles on the WTA Tour plus two doubles titles on the WTA Challenger Tour. In addition, she won 21 doubles titles and one singles title on the ITF Circuit.

Competing for the Belarus Fed Cup team, Marozava has an overall win–loss record of 4–3.

Having entered the tournament as alternates when second seeds Hailey Baptiste and Caty McNally withdrew, she won the doubles at the 2022 Abierto Zapopan, a WTA 250 event in Mexico, playing with Kaitlyn Christian and defeating Wang Xinyu and Zhu Lin in the final.

Marozava retired from pro tour in July 2026 and is now a tennis coach.

== Performance timeline ==
Key
W	F	SF	QF	#R	RR	Q#	DNQ	A	NH

(W) winner; (F) finalist; (SF) semifinalist; (QF) quarterfinalist; (#R) rounds 4, 3, 2, 1; (RR) round-robin stage; (Q#) qualification round; (DNQ) did not qualify; (A) absent; (NH) not held; (SR) strike rate (events won / competed); (W–L) win–loss record.
To avoid confusion and double counting, these charts are updated at the conclusion of a tournament or when the player's participation has ended.

=== Doubles ===
Tournament	2017	2018	2019	2020	2021	2022	2023	2024	SR	W–L	Win %
Grand Slam tournaments
Australian Open	A	2R	2R	A	A	1R	1R	1R	0 / 5	2–5	
French Open	A	1R	1R	A	A	2R	1R	1R	0 / 5	1–5	
Wimbledon	2R	1R	1R	NH	A	A (Note: Suspended due to politics.)	3R	A	0 / 4	3–4	
US Open	A	2R	1R	A	1R	2R	1R	A	0 / 5	2–5	
Win–Loss	1–1	2–4	1–4	0–0	0–1	2–3	2–4	0–2	0 / 19	8–19	
Year-end championships
WTA Elite Trophy	A	F	A	Not Held			DNQ		0 / 1	1–2	
WTA 1000 + former^{†} tournaments
Qatar Open	NTI	1R	NTI	A	NTI	A	NTI	A	0 / 1	0–1	
Dubai Championships	A	NTI	1R	NTI	1R	NTI	A	A	0 / 2	0–2	
Indian Wells Open	A	A	1R	NH	A	A	A	A	0 / 1	0–1	
Miami Open	A	A	2R	NH	A	1R	A	A	0 / 2	1–2	
Madrid Open	A	A	2R	NH	A	1R	A	A	0 / 2	1–2	
Italian Open	A	A	QF	A	A	1R	A	A	0 / 2	2–2	
Canadian Open	A	QF	A	NH	A	A	1R	A	0 / 2	1–2	
Cincinnati Open	A	2R	1R	A	A	A	A	A	0 / 2	1–2	
China Open	A	1R	A	Not Held			A	A	0 / 1	0–1	
Wuhan Open	A	SF	A	Not Held				A	0 / 1	3–1	
Guadalajara Open^{†}	Not Held					1R	A	NTI	0 / 1	0–1	

== WTA Elite Trophy ==
=== Doubles: 1 (runner-up) ===
Result	Year	Location	Surface	Partner	Opponents	Score
Loss	2018	Zhuhai, China	Hard (i)	(Japan) Shuko Aoyama	(Ukraine) Lyudmyla Kichenok (Ukraine) Nadiia Kichenok	4–6, 6–3, [7–10]

== WTA Tour finals ==
=== Doubles: 9 (4 titles, 5 runner-ups) ===
Legend WTA Elite Trophy (0–1) International / WTA 250 (4–4)	Finals by surface Hard (2–2) Clay (1–2) Grass (1–0)	Finals by setting Outdoor (3–5) Indoor (1–0)

Result	W–L	Date	Tournament	Tier	Surface	Partner	Opponents	Score
Loss	0–1	Jul 2016	Swedish Open, Sweden	International	Clay	(Netherlands) Lesley Kerkhove	(Romania) Andreea Mitu (Poland) Alicja Rosolska	3–6, 5–7
Win	1–1	Oct 2017	Luxembourg Open	International	Hard (i)	(Netherlands) Lesley Kerkhove	(Canada) Eugenie Bouchard (Belgium) Kirsten Flipkens	6–7^{(4–7)}, 6–4, [10–6]
Loss	1–2	May 2018	Prague Open, Czech Republic	International	Clay	(Romania) Mihaela Buzărnescu	(United States) Nicole Melichar (Czech Republic) Květa Peschke	4–6, 2–6
Loss	1–3	Oct 2018	Hong Kong Open, China	International	Hard	(Japan) Shuko Aoyama	(Australia) Samantha Stosur (China) Zhang Shuai	4–6, 4–6
Loss	1–4	Nov 2018	WTA Elite Trophy, China	Elite	Hard	(Japan) Shuko Aoyama	(Ukraine) Lyudmyla Kichenok (Ukraine) Nadiia Kichenok	4–6, 6–3, [7–10]
Win	2–4	Jul 2021	Poland Open	WTA 250	Clay	(Kazakhstan) Anna Danilina	(Ukraine) Kateryna Bondarenko (Poland) Katarzyna Piter	6–3, 6–2
Win	3–4	Feb 2022	Abierto Zapopan, Mexico	WTA 250	Hard	(United States) Kaitlyn Christian	(China) Wang Xinyu (China) Zhu Lin	7–5, 6–3
Loss	3–5	May 2023	Rabat Grand Prix, Morocco	WTA 250	Clay	(Brazil) Ingrid Martins	(United States) Sabrina Santamaria; Yana Sizikova	6–3, 1–6, [8–10]
Win	4–5	Jun 2023	Bad Homburg Open, Germany	WTA 250	Grass	(Brazil) Ingrid Martins	(Japan) Eri Hozumi (Romania) Monica Niculescu	6–0, 7–6^{(7–3)}

== WTA 125 finals ==
=== Doubles: 2 (2 titles) ===
Result	W–L	Date	Tournament	Surface	Partner	Opponents	Score
Win	1–0	Sep 2020	Prague Open, Czech Republic	Clay	(Romania) Andreea Mitu	(Italy) Giulia Gatto-Monticone (Argentina) Nadia Podoroska	6–4, 6–4
Win	2–0	Jul 2021	Belgrade Challenger, Serbia	Clay	(Belarus) Olga Govortsova	(Russia) Alena Fomina (Russia) Ekaterina Yashina	6–2, 6–2

== ITF Circuit finals ==
=== Singles: 2 (1 title, 1 runner-up) ===
Legend 25k tournaments (1–0) 10k tournaments (0–1)	Finals by surface Hard (1–0) Clay (0–1)

Result	W–L	Date	Tournament	Tier	Surface	Opponent	Score
Loss	0–1	Jun 2014	ITF Minsk, Belarus	10k	Clay	(France) Chloé Paquet	2–6, 4–6
Win	1–1	Sep 2017	ITF Guiyang, China	25k	Hard	(Uzbekistan) Sabina Sharipova	6–2, 6–4

=== Doubles: 36 (21 titles, 15 runner-ups) ===
Legend $100,000 tournaments (1–1) $50/60,000 tournaments (4–1) $25,000 tournaments (8–5) $10/15,000 tournaments (8–8)	Finals by surface Hard (12–10) Clay (9–3) Carpet (0–2)

Result	W–L	Date	Tournament	Tier	Surface	Partner	Opponents	Score
Loss	0–1	Oct 2009	ITF Stockholm, Sweden	10,000	Hard (i)	(Russia) Alexandra Artamonova	(Ukraine) Lyudmyla Kichenok (Ukraine) Nadiia Kichenok	3–6, 1–6
Loss	0–2	Sep 2010	ITF Novi Sad, Serbia	10,000	Clay	(Russia) Ekaterina Yakovleva	(Czech Republic) Jana Jandová (Czech Republic) Martina Kubičíková	7–6^{(4)}, 4–6, [9–11]
Loss	0–3	Feb 2011	ITF Zell am Harmersbach, Germany	10,000	Carpet (i)	(Belarus) Sviatlana Pirazhenka	(Netherlands) Kim Kilsdonk (Netherlands) Nicolette van Uitert	5–7, 4–6
Loss	0–4	Apr 2011	ITF Almaty, Kazakhstan	10,000	Hard (i)	(Belarus) Sviatlana Pirazhenka	(Uzbekistan) Albina Khabibulina (Slovakia) Zuzana Luknárová	6–7^{(2)}, 6–4, [5–10]
Loss	0–5	Oct 2011	ITF Minsk, Belarus	10,000	Carpet (i)	(Ukraine) Olga Ianchuk	(Russia) Polina Monova (Russia) Anna Smolina	3–6, 4–6
Loss	0–6	Feb 2012	ITF Moscow, Russia	25,000	Hard (i)	(Russia) Tatiana Kotelnikova	(Georgia (country)) Oksana Kalashnikova (Russia) Marta Sirotkina	6–7^{(2)}, 6–4, [9–11]
Loss	0–7	Apr 2012	ITF Moscow, Russia	25,000	Hard (i)	(Russia) Tatiana Kotelnikova	(Poland) Paula Kania (Belarus) Polina Pekhova	4–6, 6–3, [7–10]
Loss	0–8	Sep 2012	ITF Sharm El Sheikh, Egypt	10,000	Hard	(Oman) Fatma Al-Nabhani	(Poland) Olga Brózda (China) Lu Jiaxiang	5–7, 2–6
Win	1–8	Dec 2012	ITF Istanbul, Turkey	10,000	Hard (i)	(Russia) Ekaterina Yashina	(Georgia (country)) Ekaterine Gorgodze (Georgia (country)) Sofia Kvatsabaia	6–3, 6–2
Win	2–8	Jan 2013	ITF Sharm El Sheikh, Egypt	10,000	Hard	(Russia) Eugeniya Pashkova	(Austria) Melanie Klaffner (Turkey) Melis Sezer	6–3, 6–1
Win	3–8	Jun 2013	ITF Sharm El Sheikh, Egypt	10,000	Hard	(India) Kyra Shroff	(Russia) Alina Mikheeva (Poland) Sylwia Zagórska	6–4, 6–2
Loss	3–9	Jun 2013	ITF Istanbul, Turkey	10,000	Hard	(Russia) Polina Leykina	(Germany) Christina Shakovets (Bulgaria) Julia Stamatova	2–6, 0–6
Win	4–9	Jul 2013	ITF Istanbul, Turkey	10,000	Hard	(Russia) Polina Leykina	(Ukraine) Maryna Kolb (Ukraine) Nadiya Kolb	7–6^{(2)}, 7–5
Win	5–9	Jun 2014	Kazan Open, Russia	10,000	Clay	(Russia) Margarita Lazareva	(Russia) Polina Novoselova (Russia) Sofia Smagina	6–1, 0–6, [10–6]
Win	6–9	Jun 2014	ITF Minsk, Belarus	10,000	Clay	(Belarus) Sviatlana Pirazhenka	(Russia) Anna Smolina (Russia) Liubov Vasilyeva	6–1, 6–3
Loss	6–10	Jun 2014	ITF Minsk, Belarus	25,000	Clay	(Belarus) Sviatlana Pirazhenka	(Russia) Irina Khromacheva (Belarus) Ilona Kremen	5–7, 0–6
Loss	6–11	Jul 2014	ITF Plzeň, Czech Republic	25,000	Clay	(Ukraine) Anastasiya Vasylyeva	(Austria) Sandra Klemenschits (Czech Republic) Renata Voráčová	4–6, 5–7
Win	7–11	Nov 2014	ITF Équeurdreville, France	25,000	Hard (i)	(Russia) Olga Doroshina	(France) Fanny Caramaro (France) Alice Ramé	6–3, 6–3
Win	8–11	Nov 2014	ITF Minsk, Belarus	25,000	Hard (i)	(Belarus) Ilona Kremen	(Russia) Olga Doroshina (Georgia (country)) Sofia Shapatava	6–3, 6–4
Win	9–11	Feb 2015	ITF Moscow, Russia	25,000	Hard (i)	(Ukraine) Anastasiya Vasylyeva	(Russia) Natela Dzalamidze (Russia) Veronika Kudermetova	6–4, 6–4
Win	10–11	Apr 2015	ITF Dijon, France	15,000	Hard (i)	(Russia) Olga Doroshina	(Germany) Nicola Geuer (Germany) Laura Schaeder	4–6, 6–2, [10–2]
Win	11–11	Jul 2015	ITF Darmstadt, Germany	25,000	Clay	(Russia) Irina Khromacheva	(Turkey) Pemra Özgen (Germany) Anne Schäfer	6–4, 6–4
Win	12–11	Jul 2015	ITF Horb, Germany	15,000	Clay	(Germany) Carolin Daniels	(Argentina) Catalina Pella (Argentina) Guadalupe Pérez Rojas	7–6^{(3)}, 4–6, [10–7]
Win	13–11	Aug 2015	Neva Cup St. Petersburg, Russia	25,000	Clay	(Germany) Carolin Daniels	(Russia) Natela Dzalamidze (Russia) Veronika Kudermetova	6–4, 4–6, [10–6]
Win	14–11	Sep 2015	Open de Biarritz, France	100,000	Clay	(Turkey) Başak Eraydın	(Hungary) Réka Luca Jani (Liechtenstein) Stephanie Vogt	6–4, 6–4
Loss	14–12	Feb 2016	Grenoble Open, France	25,000	Hard (i)	(Switzerland) Amra Sadiković	(France) Manon Arcangioli (France) Alizé Lim	5–7, 2–6
Loss	14–13	Mar 2016	ITF Nanjing, China	10,000	Hard	(Russia) Kseniia Bekker	(Netherlands) Chayenne Ewijk (Netherlands) Rosalie van der Hoek	4–6, 2–6
Loss	14–14	Apr 2016	Lale Cup Istanbul, Turkey	50,000	Hard	(Russia) Valentyna Ivakhnenko	(Uzbekistan) Nigina Abduraimova (Czech Republic) Barbora Štefková	4–6, 6–1, [6–10]
Win	15–14	Dec 2016	Ankara Cup, Turkey	50,000	Hard (i)	(Russia) Anna Blinkova	(Uzbekistan) Sabina Sharipova (Russia) Ekaterina Yashina	4–6, 6–3, [11–9]
Win	16–14	Mar 2017	Zhuhai Open, China	60,000	Hard	(Netherlands) Lesley Kerkhove	(Ukraine) Lyudmyla Kichenok (Ukraine) Nadiia Kichenok	6–4, 6–2
Win	17–14	Jun 2017	Bredeney Ladies Open, Germany	25,000	Clay	(Germany) Carolin Daniels	(Bosnia and Herzegovina) Anita Husarić (Belgium) Kimberley Zimmermann	6–1, 6–4
Win	18–14	Aug 2017	ITF Leipzig, Germany	25,000	Clay	(Russia) Valentyna Ivakhnenko	(Croatia) Tereza Mrdeža (India) Ankita Raina	6–2, 6–1
Win	19–14	Sep 2017	ITF Guiyang, China	25,000	Hard	(Uzbekistan) Sabina Sharipova	(China) Jiang Xinyu (China) Tang Qianhui	6–2, 6–3
Loss	19–15	Dec 2017	Dubai Tennis Challenge, UAE	W100+H	Hard	(Netherlands) Lesley Kerkhove	(Romania) Mihaela Buzărnescu (Russia) Alena Fomina	4–6, 3–6
Win	20–15	Apr 2021	Oeiras Ladies Open, Portugal	W60	Clay	(Romania) Andreea Mitu	(Russia) Marina Melnikova (Switzerland) Conny Perrin	3–6, 6–4, [10–3]
Win	21–15	Mar 2022	Guanajuato Open, Mexico	W60+H	Hard	(United States) Kaitlyn Christian	Anastasia Tikhonova (Latvia) Daniela Vismane	6–0, 6–2

== Fed Cup participation ==
=== Singles (0–1) ===
Edition	Stage	Date	Location	Against	Surface	Opponent	W/L	Score
2013	Z1 P/O	Feb 2013	Eilat (ISR)	Israel	Hard	Julia Glushko	L	2–6, 4–6

=== Doubles (4–2) ===
Edition	Stage	Date	Location	Against	Surface	Partner	Opponents	W/L	Score
2013	Z1 R/R	Feb 2013	Eilat (ISR)	(Georgia (country)) Georgia	Hard	Aliaksandra Sasnovich	Ekaterine Gorgodze; Sofia Kvatsabaia	W	6–2, 6–2
2013	Z1 R/R	Feb 2013	Eilat (ISR)	Croatia	Hard	Aliaksandra Sasnovich	Darija Jurak; Tereza Mrdeža	L	6–7^{(2)}, 3–6
