= 2019 WTA Elite Trophy – Doubles =

Doubles
- 2019 WTA Elite Trophy

Final
- Champions: (Ukraine) Lyudmyla Kichenok (Slovenia) Andreja Klepač
- Runners-up: (China) Duan Yingying (China) Yang Zhaoxuan
- Score: 6–3, 6–3

Events
Singles	Doubles
← 2018 ·	WTA Elite Trophy	· 2023 →

Lyudmyla and Nadiia Kichenok were the defending champions, but Nadiia Kichenok chose not to participate.

Lyudmyla Kichenok played alongside Andreja Klepač, and successfully defended her title, defeating Duan Yingying and Yang Zhaoxuan in the final, 6–3, 6–3.

== Players ==
1. (China) Duan Yingying / (China) Yang Zhaoxuan (final)
2. (Ukraine) Lyudmyla Kichenok / (Slovenia) Andreja Klepač (champions)
3. (Croatia) Darija Jurak / (Poland) Alicja Rosolska (round robin)
4. (Georgia (country)) Oksana Kalashnikova / (United States) Sofia Kenin (round robin)
5. (China) Jiang Xinyu / (China) Tang Qianhui (round robin)
6. (China) Wang Xinyu / (China) Zhu Lin (round robin)

== Draw ==
=== Key ===
- Q = Qualifier
- WC = Wild card
- LL = Lucky loser
- Alt = Alternate
- SE = Special exempt
- PR = Protected ranking
- ITF = ITF entry
- JE = Junior exempt
- w/o = Walkover
- r = Retired
- d = Defaulted
- SR = Special ranking

=== Final ===
Final
1	(China) Duan Yingying (China) Yang Zhaoxuan	3	3
2	(Ukraine) Lyudmyla Kichenok (Slovenia) Andreja Klepač	6	6

=== Lily group ===
		(China) Duan (China) Yang	(Croatia) Jurak (Poland) Rosolska	(China) Wang (China) Zhu	RR W–L	Set W–L	Game W–L	Standings
1	(China) Duan Yingying (China) Yang Zhaoxuan		6–1, 1–6, [10–7]	3–6, 6–3, [10–8]	2–0	4–2 (67%)	18–16 (53%)	1
3	(Croatia) Darija Jurak (Poland) Alicja Rosolska	1–6, 6–1, [7–10]		6–2, 3–6, [6–10]	0–2	2–4 (33%)	16–17 (48%)	3
6/WC	(China) Wang Xinyu (China) Zhu Lin	6–3, 3–6, [8–10]	2–6, 6–3, [10–6]		1–1	3–3 (50%)	18–19 (49%)	2

=== Bougainvillea group ===
		(Ukraine) Kichenok (Slovenia) Klepač	(Georgia (country)) Kalashnikova (United States) Kenin	(China) Jiang (China) Tang	RR W–L	Set W–L	Game W–L	Standings
2	(Ukraine) Lyudmyla Kichenok (Slovenia) Andreja Klepač		2–6, 6–4, [11–9]	2–6, 6–4, [10–6]	2–0	4–2 (67%)	18–20 (47%)	1
4	(Georgia (country)) Oksana Kalashnikova (United States) Sofia Kenin	6–2, 4–6, [9–11]		2–6, 6–4, [7–10]	0–2	2–4 (33%)	18–20 (47%)	3
5/WC	(China) Jiang Xinyu (China) Tang Qianhui	6–2, 4–6, [6–10]	6–2, 4–6, [10–7]		1–1	3–3 (50%)	21–17 (55%)	2
