= Xu Yifan =

Chinese tennis player (born 1988)

Xu Yifan 徐一璠
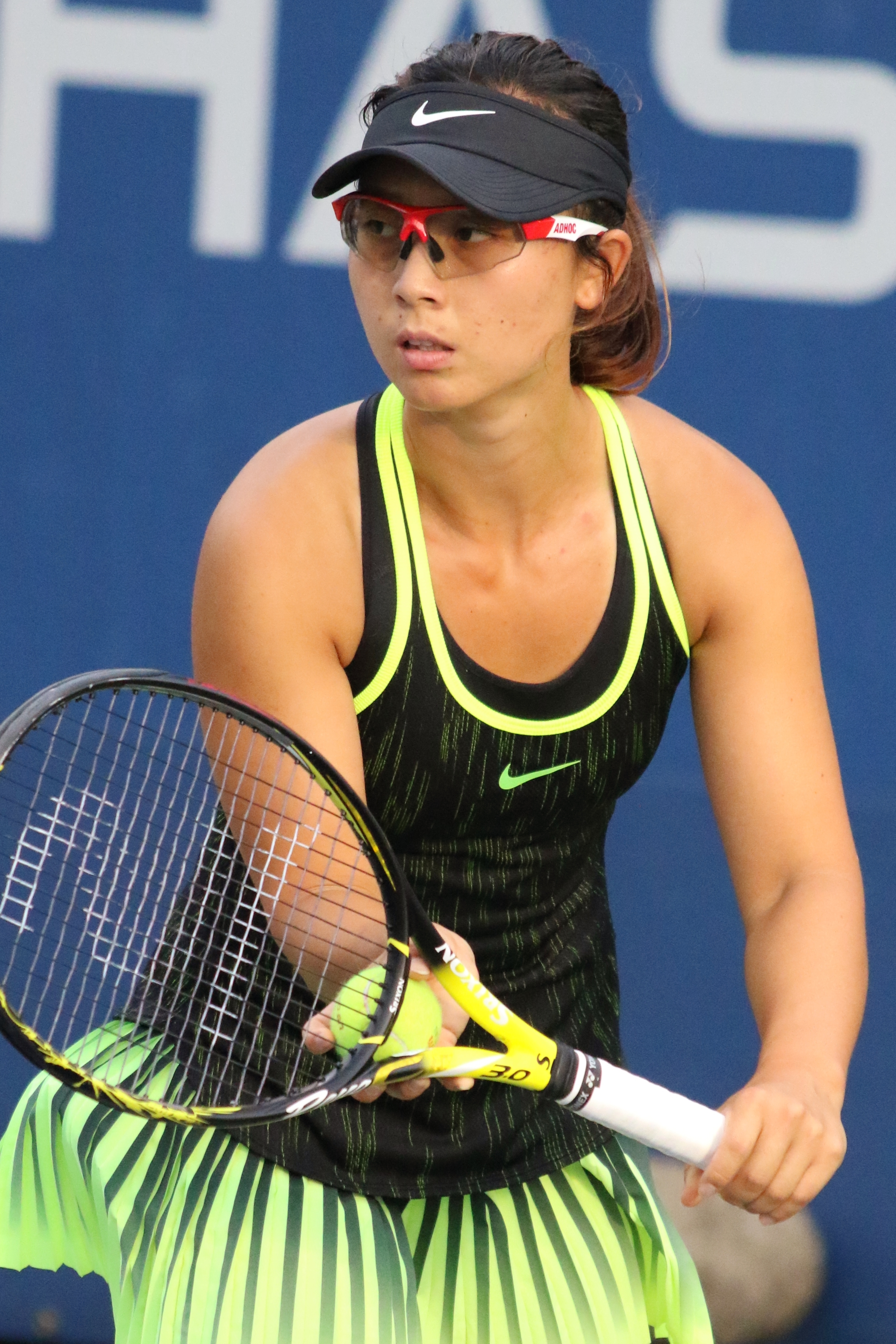
- Xu Yifan at the 2016 US Open
- Country (sports): China
- Residence: Tianjin, China
- Born: 8 August 1988 (age 38) Tianjin
- Height: 1.65 m (5 ft 5 in)
- Plays: Left (two-handed backhand)
- Prize money: $4,212,700

Singles
- Career record: 217–193
- Career titles: 0 WTA, 1 ITF
- Highest ranking: No. 148 (13 July 2015)

Grand Slam singles results
- Australian Open: Q2 (2016)
- French Open: Q1 (2015)
- Wimbledon: 1R (2015)
- US Open: Q2 (2012)

Doubles
- Career record: 522–370
- Career titles: 14
- Highest ranking: No. 7 (13 January 2020)
- Current ranking: No. 24 (19 October 2026)

Grand Slam doubles results
- Australian Open: SF (2016)
- French Open: QF (2016, 2019, 2022)
- Wimbledon: F (2019)
- US Open: F (2020)

Other doubles tournaments
- Tour Finals: QF (2017, 2018)
- Olympic Games: 2R (2016, 2021)

Grand Slam mixed doubles results
- Australian Open: 2R (2017)
- French Open: 2R (2016)
- Wimbledon: F (2023)
- US Open: QF (2023)
Medal record
Representing China
Women's Tennis
Asian Games
Gold medal – first place	2018 Jakarta	Doubles
- Last updated on: 19 October 2026.

Xu Yifan (Chinese: 徐一璠; pinyin: Xú Yīfán; Mandarin pronunciation: [ɕy̌ í fǎn]; born 8 August 1988), nicknamed Julie, is a Chinese tennis player who specializes in doubles. She reached a career-high WTA doubles ranking of No. 7 on 13 January 2020. On 13 July 2015, she peaked at No. 148 in the singles rankings.

== Career ==
=== 2004–2013: Maiden ITF Circuit title ===
Xu made her debut playing on the ITF Women's Circuit in China. She won her first doubles title with Xia Huan in 2006.

She was a finalist in women's doubles at the 2007 and 2008 China Open in Beijing with Han Xinyun.

=== 2014–2016: Australian Open semifinalist, WTA Elite trophy champion ===
She was a quarterfinalist at the 2014 US Open in women's doubles with Zarina Diyas. She reached the semifinals at the 2016 Australian Open and was a quarterfinalist at the 2016 French Open in women's doubles with Zheng Saisai.

=== 2017–2019: Wimbledon doubles final ===
She was also a quarterfinalist in doubles at the Australian Open in 2017 with Raquel Atawo. In 2017, she formed a new partnership with Canadian Gabriela Dabrowski. Xu won the Miami Open and the Connecticut Open women's doubles with Dabrowski. She partnered with Dabrowski again in the US Open, with the pair reaching the quarterfinals.

In 2018, the duo won the doubles competition at the Sydney International, and then reached the quarterfinals in Melbourne, just like 2019 at the French Open and US Open. The biggest achievement of the Canadian/Chinese pair was reaching the final of the 2019 Wimbledon Championships, losing to Barbora Strycova and Hsieh Su-wei.

She made the quarterfinals at the 2018 WTA Finals with Gabriela Dabrowski for a second consecutive year having done so also in 2017. She also qualified for the 2019 WTA Finals for a third year in a row.

=== 2020–2021: US Open and WTA 1000 finals, world No. 7 in doubles ===
She reached the finals of the Cincinnati Open and the US Open with Nicole Melichar.

In 2021, she competed at the Tokyo Olympics with Yang Zhaoxuan.

=== 2022: Second WTA 1000 title, French Open quarterfinal ===
In Indian Wells, she won the second WTA 1000 title of her career in doubles, partnering with Yang Zhaoxuan. They also took the title at the Silicon Valley Classic

She qualified for her fourth WTA Finals with a different partner, compatriot Yang Zhaoxuan.

== Performance timeline ==
Key
W	F	SF	QF	#R	RR	Q#	P#	DNQ	A	Z#	PO	G	S	B	NMS	NTI	P	NH

(W) winner; (F) finalist; (SF) semifinalist; (QF) quarterfinalist; (#R) rounds 4, 3, 2, 1; (RR) round-robin stage; (Q#) qualification round; (P#) preliminary round; (DNQ) did not qualify; (A) absent; (Z#) Davis/Fed Cup Zonal Group (with number indication) or (PO) play-off; (G) gold, (S) silver or (B) bronze Olympic/Paralympic medal; (NMS) not a Masters tournament; (NTI) not a Tier I tournament; (P) postponed; (NH) not held; (SR) strike rate (events won / competed); (W–L) win–loss record.
To avoid confusion and double counting, these charts are updated at the conclusion of a tournament or when the player's participation has ended.

=== Doubles ===
Tournament	2014	2015	2016	2017	2018	2019	2020	2021	2022	2023	2024	2025	2026	W–L	Win %
Australian Open	A	1R	SF	QF	QF	1R	1R	2R	3R	A	1R	2R	2R	15–11	58%
French Open	A	2R	QF	3R	3R	QF	A	2R	QF	3R	1R	1R	1R	17–11	61%
Wimbledon	Q2	1R	1R	1R	SF	F	NH	A	3R	1R	2R	1R	SF	16–10	62%
US Open	QF	1R	3R	QF	2R	QF	F	A	3R	1R	1R	3R	2R	22–12	65%
Win–Loss	3–1	1–4	9–4	8–4	10–4	11–4	5–2	2–2	9–4	2–3	1–4	3–4	6–5	70–45	61%
National representation
Summer Olympics	NH		2R	NH				2R	NH		A	NH		2–2	50%
Year-end championships
WTA Finals	DNQ			1R	1R	RR	NH	DNQ	RR	DNQ				1–4	20%
WTA Elite Trophy	NH	DNQ	W	A	A	A	NH			RR				4–1	80%
WTA 1000 tournaments
Qatar Open	A	NTI	2R	NTI	A	NTI	QF	NTI	A	NTI	SF	2R	1R		
Dubai Championships	NTI	1R	NTI	1R	NTI	QF	NTI	F	NTI	2R	2R	SF	1R		
Indian Wells Open	A	A	2R	1R	SF	SF	NH	A	W	1R	1R	2R	2R	14–8	64%
Miami Open	A	A	SF	W	1R	QF	NH	2R	2R	2R	2R	2R	QF	17–9	65%
Madrid Open	A	A	2R	2R	2R	F	NH	QF	1R	2R	2R	2R	1R	11–10	52%
Italian Open	A	A	1R	1R	QF	2R	A	1R	QF	1R	1R	1R	1R	4–10	29%
Canadian Open	A	A	1R	A	1R	SF	NH	A	2R	1R	1R	1R	1R	3–8	27%
Cincinnati Open	A	A	2R	A	A	2R	F	A	2R	2R	2R	1R	1R	8–8	50%
Wuhan Open (Note: Held as Pan Pacific Open until 2013, Wuhan Open since 2014.)	1R	1R	1R	QF	QF	2R	NH				2R	A	A	4–7	36%
China Open	1R	1R	1R	QF	F	QF	NH			QF	1R	2R	1R	9–10	47%
Guadalajara Open	Not Held								SF	2R	Not Tier I			4–2	67%
Career statistics
Year-end ranking	75	49	20	16	12	8	9	37	15	55	43	41		$4,212,700	

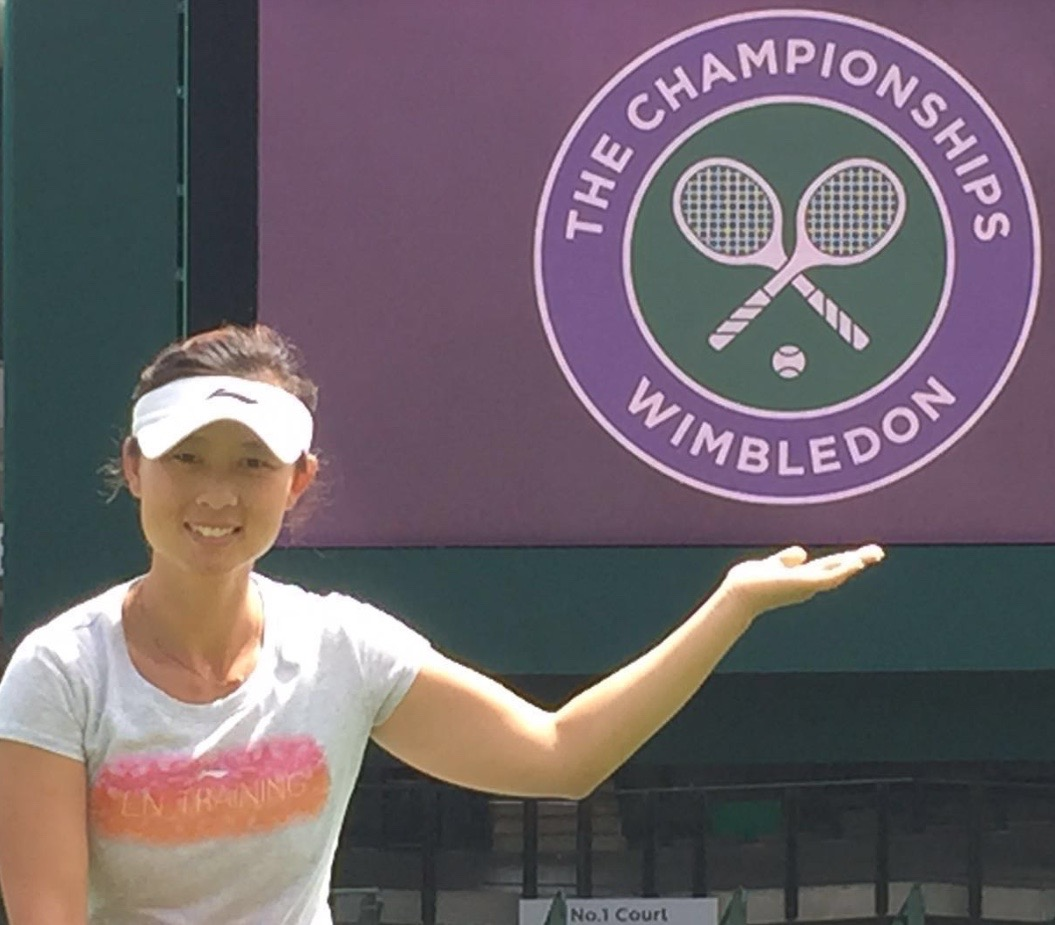
Xu at Wimbledon in 2015

== Grand Slam tournament finals ==
=== Doubles: 2 (runner-ups) ===
Result	Year	Tournament	Surface	Partner	Opponents	Score
Loss	2019	Wimbledon	Grass	(Canada) Gabriela Dabrowski	(Chinese Taipei) Hsieh Su-wei (Czech Republic) Barbora Strýcová	2–6, 4–6
Loss	2020	US Open	Hard	(United States) Nicole Melichar	(Germany) Laura Siegemund (Russia) Vera Zvonareva	4–6, 4–6

=== Mixed: 1 (runner-up) ===
Result	Year	Championship	Surface	Partner	Opponents	Score
Loss	2023	Wimbledon	Grass	(Belgium) Joran Vliegen	(Ukraine) Lyudmyla Kichenok (Croatia) Mate Pavić	4–6, 7–6^{(11–9)}, 3–6

== Other significant finals ==
=== WTA 1000 tournaments ===
==== Doubles: 6 (2 titles, 4 runner-ups) ====
Result	Year	Tournament	Surface	Partner	Opponents	Score
Win	2017	Miami Open	Hard	(Canada) Gabriela Dabrowski	(India) Sania Mirza (Czech Republic) Barbora Strýcová	6–4, 6–3
Loss	2018	China Open	Hard	(Canada) Gabriela Dabrowski	(Czech Republic) Andrea Sestini Hlaváčková (Czech Republic) Barbora Strýcová	6–4, 4–6, [8–10]
Loss	2019	Madrid Open	Clay	(Canada) Gabriela Dabrowski	(Chinese Taipei) Hsieh Su-wei (Czech Republic) Barbora Strýcová	3–6, 1–6
Loss	2020	Cincinnati Open	Hard	(United States) Nicole Melichar	(Czech Republic) Květa Peschke (Netherlands) Demi Schuurs	1–6, 6–4, [4–10]
Loss	2021	Dubai Championships	Hard	(China) Yang Zhaoxuan	(Chile) Alexa Guarachi (Croatia) Darija Jurak	0–6, 3–6
Win	2022	Indian Wells Open	Hard	(China) Yang Zhaoxuan	(United States) Asia Muhammad (Japan) Ena Shibahara	7–5, 7–6^{(7–4)}

=== WTA Elite Trophy ===
==== Doubles: 1 (title) ====
Result	Year	Location	Surface	Partner	Opponents	Score
Win	2016	Zhuhai, China	Hard (i)	(Turkey) İpek Soylu	(China) Yang Zhaoxuan (China) You Xiaodi	6–4, 3–6, [10–7]

== WTA Tour finals ==
=== Doubles: 26 (14 titles, 12 runner-ups) ===
Legend
Grand Slam tournaments (0–2)
Elite Trophy (1–0)
Premier M & 5 / WTA 1000 (2–4)
Tier II / Premier / WTA 500 (6–2)
International / WTA 250 (5–4)

Result	W–L	Date	Tournament	Tier	Surface	Partner	Opponents	Score
Loss	0–1	Sep 2007	China Open, China	Tier II	Hard	(China) Han Xinyun	(Chinese Taipei) Chuang Chia-jung (Chinese Taipei) Hsieh Su-wei	6–7^{(3–7}), 3–6
Loss	0–2	Sep 2008	China Open, China	Tier II	Hard	(China) Han Xinyun	(Spain) Anabel Medina Garrigues (Denmark) Caroline Wozniacki	1–6, 3–6
Win	1–2	Sep 2013	Korea Open, South Korea	International	Hard	(Chinese Taipei) Chan Chin-wei	(United States) Raquel Kops-Jones (United States) Abigail Spears	7–5, 6–3
Win	2–2	Aug 2015	Silicon Valley Classic, United States	Premier	Hard	(China) Zheng Saisai	(Spain) Anabel Medina Garrigues (Spain) Arantxa Parra Santonja	6–1, 6–3
Win	3–2	Oct 2015	Tianjin Open, China	International	Hard	(China) Zheng Saisai	(Croatia) Darija Jurak (United States) Nicole Melichar	6–2, 3–6, [10–8]
Loss	3–3	Jan 2016	Shenzhen Open, China	International	Hard	(China) Zheng Saisai	(United States) Vania King (Romania) Monica Niculescu	1–6, 4–6
Loss	3–4	Oct 2016	Tianjin Open, China	International	Hard	(Poland) Magda Linette	(United States) Christina McHale (China) Peng Shuai	6–7^{(8–10)}, 0–6
Win	4–4	Nov 2016	Elite Trophy, China	Elite	Hard (i)	(Turkey) İpek Soylu	(China) Yang Zhaoxuan (China) You Xiaodi	6–4, 3–6, [10–7]
Win	5–4	Apr 2017	Miami Open, United States	Premier M	Hard	(Canada) Gabriela Dabrowski	(India) Sania Mirza (Czech Republic) Barbora Strýcová	6–4, 6–3
Win	6–4	Aug 2017	Connecticut Open, US	Premier	Hard	(Canada) Gabriela Dabrowski	(Australia) Ashleigh Barty (Australia) Casey Dellacqua	3–6, 6–3, [10–8]
Win	7–4	Jan 2018	Sydney International, Australia	Premier	Hard	(Canada) Gabriela Dabrowski	(Chinese Taipei) Latisha Chan (Czech Republic) Andrea Sestini Hlaváčková	6–3, 6–1
Win	8–4	Jun 2018	Eastbourne International, United Kingdom	Premier	Grass	(Canada) Gabriela Dabrowski	(Romania) Irina-Camelia Begu (Romania) Mihaela Buzărnescu	6–3, 7–5
Loss	8–5	Oct 2018	China Open, China	Premier M	Hard	(Canada) Gabriela Dabrowski	(Czech Republic) Andrea Sestini Hlaváčková (Czech Republic) Barbora Strýcová	6–4, 4–6, [8–10]
Loss	8–6	May 2019	Madrid Open, Spain	Premier M	Clay	(Canada) Gabriela Dabrowski	(Chinese Taipei) Hsieh Su-wei (Czech Republic) Barbora Strýcová	3–6, 1–6
Win	9–6	May 2019	Nuremberg Cup, Germany	International	Clay	(Canada) Gabriela Dabrowski	(Canada) Sharon Fichman (United States) Nicole Melichar	4–6, 7–6^{(7–5)}, [10–5]
Loss	9–7	Jul 2019	Wimbledon, UK	Grand Slam	Grass	(Canada) Gabriela Dabrowski	(Chinese Taipei) Hsieh Su-wei (Czech Republic) Barbora Strýcová	2–6, 4–6
Win	10–7	Jan 2020	Adelaide International, Australia	Premier	Hard	(United States) Nicole Melichar	(Canada) Gabriela Dabrowski (Croatia) Darija Jurak	2–6, 7–5, [10–5]
Loss	10–8	Aug 2020	Cincinnati Open, US	Premier 5	Hard	(United States) Nicole Melichar	(Czech Republic) Květa Peschke (Netherlands) Demi Schuurs	1–6, 6–4, [4–10]
Loss	10–9	Sep 2020	US Open, United States	Grand Slam	Hard	(United States) Nicole Melichar	(Germany) Laura Siegemund (Russia) Vera Zvonareva	4–6, 4–6
Loss	10–10	Mar 2021	Dubai Championships, UAE	WTA 1000	Hard	(China) Yang Zhaoxuan	(Chile) Alexa Guarachi (Croatia) Darija Jurak	0–6, 3–6
Win	11–10	Mar 2022	Indian Wells Open, US	WTA 1000	Hard	(China) Yang Zhaoxuan	(United States) Asia Muhammad (Japan) Ena Shibahara	7–5, 7–6^{(7–4)}
Win	12–10	Aug 2022	Silicon Valley Classic, US (2)	WTA 500	Hard	(China) Yang Zhaoxuan	(Japan) Shuko Aoyama (Chinese Taipei) Chan Hao-ching	7–5, 6–0
Win	13–10	May 2023	Internationaux de Strasbourg, France	WTA 250	Clay	(China) Yang Zhaoxuan	(United States) Desirae Krawczyk (Mexico) Giuliana Olmos	6–3, 6–2
Loss	13–11	May 2024	Rabat Grand Prix, Morocco	WTA 250	Clay	(Kazakhstan) Anna Danilina	(Russia) Irina Khromacheva (Russia) Yana Sizikova	3–6, 2–6
Win	14–11	Aug 2024	Tennis in the Land, US	WTA 250	Hard	(Spain) Cristina Bucșa	(Japan) Shuko Aoyama (Japan) Eri Hozumi	3–6, 6–3, [10–6]
Loss	14–12	Jan 2026	Auckland Open, New Zealand	WTA 250	Hard	(China) Yang Zhaoxuan	(France) Kristina Mladenovic (China) Guo Hanyu	6–7^{(7–9)}, 1–6

== WTA 125 finals ==
=== Doubles: 2 (1 title, 1 runner-up) ===
Result	W–L	Date	Tournament	Surface	Partner	Opponents	Score
Win	1–0	Nov 2013	Nanjing Ladies Open, China	Hard	(Japan) Misaki Doi	(China) Zhang Shuai (Kazakhstan) Yaroslava Shvedova	6–1, 6–4
Loss	1–1	Jul 2014	Jiangxi International, China	Hard	(Chinese Taipei) Chan Chin-wei	(Japan) Junri Namigata (Chinese Taipei) Chuang Chia-jung	6–7^{(4–7)}, 3–6

== ITF Circuit finals ==
Legend
$75,000 tournaments
$50,000 tournaments
$25,000 tournaments
$10,000 tournaments

=== Singles (1–5) ===
Result	W–L	Date	Tournament	Tier	Surface	Opponent	Score
Loss	0–1	May 2007	ITF Chengdu, China	25,000	Hard	(China) Zhang Shuai	2–6, 3–6
Loss	0–2	Apr 2010	ITF Changwon, South Korea	25,000	Hard	(South Korea) Lee Jin-a	6–3, 4–6, 2–6
Loss	0–3	May 2010	ITF Karuizawa, Japan	25,000	Carpet	(Japan) Natsumi Hamamura	1–6, 2–6
Win	1–3	Apr 2014	ITF Nanning, China	25,000	Hard	(Chinese Taipei) Chan Yung-jan	6–3, 7–6^{(1)}
Loss	1–4	Jun 2014	ITF Zhengzhou, China	25,000	Hard	(China) Zhang Kailin	5–7, 4–6
Loss	1–5	Jul 2014	ITF Phuket, Thailand	25,000	Hard (i)	(China) Wang Yafan	6–3, 2–6, 5–7

=== Doubles (21–12) ===
Result	W–L	Date	Tournament	Tier	Surface	Partner	Opponents	Score
Win	1–0	May 2006	ITF Tarakan, Indonesia	10,000	Hard	(China) Xia Huan	(Indonesia) Sandy Gumulya (Indonesia) Septi Mende	6–2, 6–7^{(3)}, 7–6^{(5)}
Loss	1–1	Jul 2006	ITF Chengdu, China	25,000	Hard	(China) Xia Huan	(China) Ren Jing (China) Zhang Shuai	4–6, 2–6
Loss	1–2	Aug 2006	ITF Changsha, China	25,000	Hard	(China) Xia Huan	(China) Chen Yanchong (China) Liu Wanting	3–6, 3–6
Loss	1–3	May 2007	ITF Chengdu, China	25,000	Hard	(China) Huang Lei	(China) Song Shanshan (China) Xie Yanze	3–6, 5–7
Win	2–3	Jun 2007	ITF Changsha, China	25,000	Hard	(China) Huang Lei	(Chinese Taipei) Chan Chin-wei (Japan) Kumiko Iijima	6–3, 6–4
Win	3–3	Jun 2007	ITF Guangzhou, China	50,000	Hard	(China) Huang Lei	(China) Chen Yanchong (China) Zhou Yimiao	6–2, 7–6^{(4)}
Loss	3–4	Nov 2007	ITF Kunming, China	50,000	Hard	(China) Han Xinyun	(Poland) Urszula Radwańska (Belgium) Yanina Wickmayer	4–6, 1–6
Win	4–4	Dec 2007	ITF Xiamen, China	75,000	Hard	(China) Han Xinyun	(China) Ji Chunmei (China) Sun Shengnan	6–4, 7–5
Win	5–4	May 2008	ITF Caserta, Italy	25,000	Clay	(China) Han Xinyun	(Australia) Sophie Ferguson (Australia) Christina Wheeler	4–6, 6–4, [10–8]
Loss	5–5	Jun 2008	ITF Périgueux, France	25,000	Clay	(China) Han Xinyun	(Germany) Anna-Lena Grönefeld (Turkey) İpek Şenoğlu	3–6, 4–6
Loss	5–6	Feb 2009	Burnie International, Australia	25,000	Hard	(China) Zhou Yimiao	(Australia) Monique Adamczak (United States) Abigail Spears	2–6, 4–6
Win	6–6	Jun 2009	ITF Komoro, Japan	25,000	Clay	(China) Zhang Shuai	(Japan) Ayumi Oka (Thailand) Varatchaya Wongteanchai	6–2, 6–1
Win	7–6	Jan 2010	ITF Pingguo, China	25,000	Hard	(Chinese Taipei) Chan Chin-wei	(China) Ji Chunmei (China) Liu Wanting	6–3, 6–1
Win	8–6	Feb 2010	ITF Surprise, United States	25,000	Hard	(China) Ji Chunmei	(United States) Christina Fusano (United States) Courtney Nagle	5–7, 6–2, [10–5]
Win	9–6	Mar 2010	ITF Hammond, US	25,000	Hard	(China) Zhou Yimiao	(United States) Christina Fusano (United States) Courtney Nagle	6–2, 6–2
Win	10–6	Mar 2010	ITF Clearwater, US	25,000	Hard	(China) Zhou Yimiao	(Russia) Alina Jidkova (Germany) Laura Siegemund	6–4, 6–4
Win	11–6	May 2010	Kurume Cup, Japan	50,000	Grass	(China) Sun Shengnan	(Czech Republic) Karolína Plíšková (Czech Republic) Kristýna Plíšková	6–0, 6–3
Loss	11–7	May 2010	ITF Karuizawa, Japan	25,000	Carpet	(China) Sun Shengnan	(Japan) Ayumi Oka (Japan) Akiko Yonemura	6–7^{(1)}, 3–6
Win	12–7	Jul 2010	ITF Fuzhou, China	25,000	Hard	(China) Liu Shaozhuo	(Chinese Taipei) Kao Shao-yuan (Japan) Ayaka Maekawa	3–6, 6–1, [10–2]
Loss	12–8	Oct 2011	ITF Kalgoorlie, Australia	25,000	Hard	(China) Zhang Kailin	(Australia) Casey Dellacqua (Australia) Olivia Rogowska	1–6, 1–6
Loss	12–9	Apr 2012	ITF Wenshan, China	50,000	Hard	(China) Liu Wanting	(Chinese Taipei) Hsieh Shu-ying (Chinese Taipei) Hsieh Su-wei	3–6, 2–6
Win	13–9	May 2012	ITF Changwon, South Korea	25,000	Hard	(China) Liu Wanting	(China) Yang Zhaoxuan (China) Zhang Kailin	6–4, 7–5
Win	14–9	May 2012	ITF Gimcheon, South Korea	25,000	Hard	(China) Hu Yueyue	(China) Liang Chen (China) Sun Shengnan	6–0, 3–6, [10–7]
Loss	14–10	Jul 2012	ITF Yakima, US	50,000	Hard	(China) Zhou Yimiao	(United States) Samantha Crawford (United States) Madison Keys	3–6, 6–2, 3–6
Win	15–10	Jul 2012	ITF Evansville, US	10,000	Hard	(China) Duan Yingying	(United States) Mallory Burdette (United States) Natalie Pluskota	6–2, 6–3
Win	16–10	Jul 2012	Lexington Challenger, US	50,000	Hard	(Japan) Shuko Aoyama	(Israel) Julia Glushko (Australia) Olivia Rogowska	7–5, 6–7^{(7)}, [10–4]
Loss	16–11	Feb 2013	ITF Surprise, US	25,000	Hard	(United States) Emily Harman	(United States) Samantha Crawford (United States) Sachia Vickery	3–6, 6–3, [7–10]
Loss	16–12	May 2013	ITF Balikpapan, Indonesia	25,000	Hard	(Chinese Taipei) Chen Yi	(United Kingdom) Naomi Broady (Serbia) Teodora Mirčić	3–6, 3–6
Win	17–12	Feb 2014	Rancho Santa Fe Open, United States	25,000	Hard	(United States) Samantha Crawford	(United States) Danielle Lao (United States) Keri Wong	3–6, 6–2, [12–10]
Win	18–12	Mar 2014	Blossom Cup, China	50,000	Hard	(Chinese Taipei) Chan Chin-wei	(China) Sun Ziyue (China) Xu Shilin	7–6^{(4)}, 6–1
Win	19–12	Apr 2015	Kangaroo Cup, Japan	75,000	Hard	(China) Wang Yafan	(Belgium) An-Sophie Mestach (United Kingdom) Emily Webley-Smith	6–2, 6–3
Win	20–12	May 2015	Anning Open, China	75,000	Clay	(China) Zheng Saisai	(China) Yang Zhaoxuan (China) Ye Qiuyu	7–5, 6–2
Win	21–12	Jun 2015	Ilkley Trophy, UK	50,000	Grass	(Romania) Raluca Olaru	(Belgium) An-Sophie Mestach (Netherlands) Demi Schuurs	6–3, 6–4
