= Duan Yingying =

Chinese tennis player (born 1989)

Duan Yingying 段莹莹
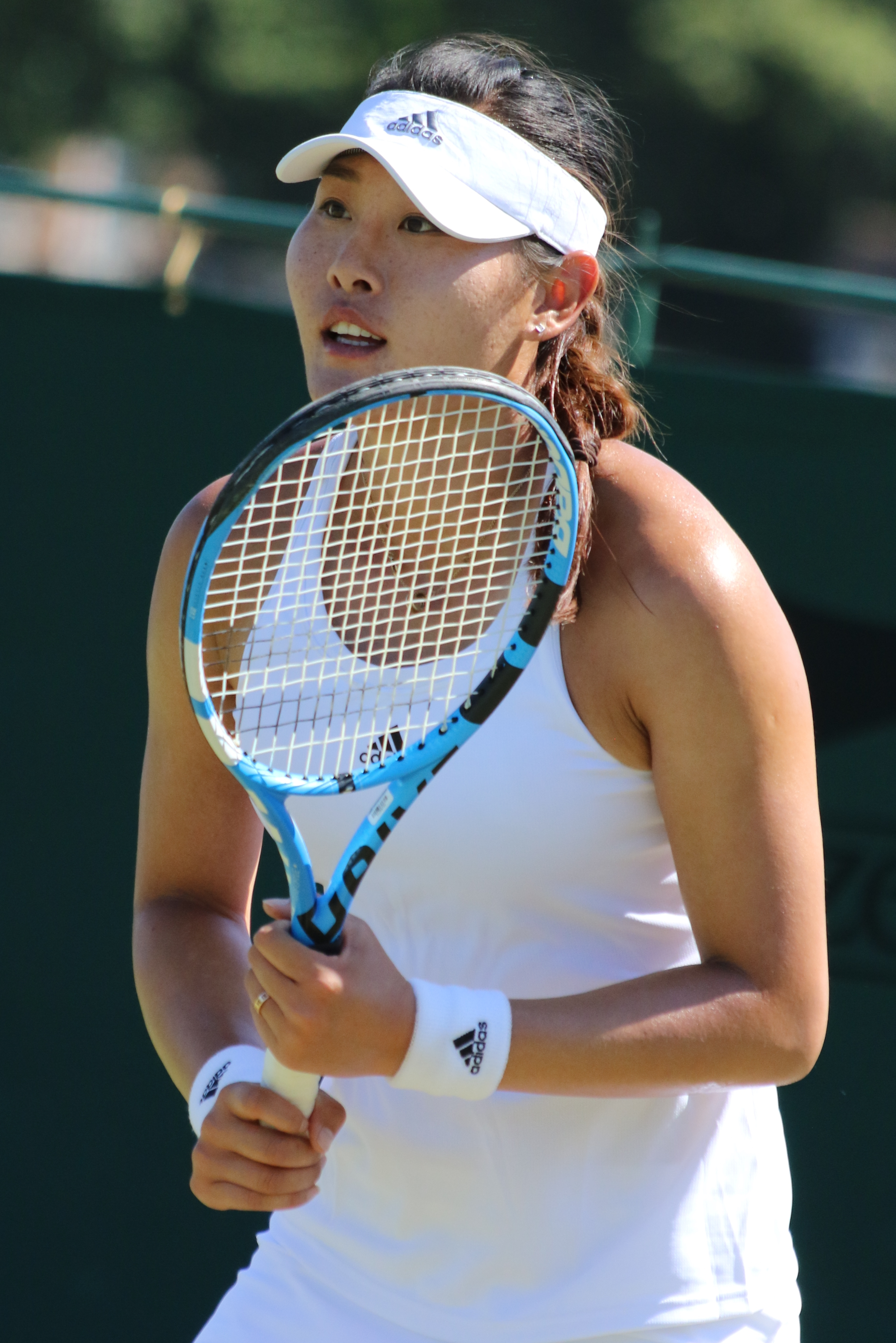
- Duan Yingying in 2018
- Country (sports): China
- Residence: Tianjin, China
- Born: 3 July 1989 (age 37) Tianjin
- Height: 1.86 m (6 ft 1 in)
- Turned pro: 2007
- Plays: Right (two-handed backhand)
- Coach: Dong Yuesen
- Prize money: US$ 1,959,160

Singles
- Career record: 299–200
- Career titles: 1
- Highest ranking: No. 60 (24 April 2017)

Grand Slam singles results
- Australian Open: 3R (2017)
- French Open: 1R (2017, 2018)
- Wimbledon: 2R (2015, 2016)
- US Open: 2R (2016, 2017)

Doubles
- Career record: 116–94
- Career titles: 3
- Highest ranking: No. 16 (3 February 2020)

Grand Slam doubles results
- Australian Open: 1R (2019, 2021)
- French Open: F (2019)
- Wimbledon: 3R (2019)
- US Open: QF (2019)

Other doubles tournaments
- Olympic Games: 1R (2021)

Grand Slam mixed doubles results
- Australian Open: 1R (2021)
- Wimbledon: 2R (2019)
- US Open: 2R (2019)
Medal record
Representing China
Women's tennis
Asian Games
Silver medal – second place	2014 Incheon	Team event

Duan Yingying
- Traditional Chinese: 段瑩瑩
- Simplified Chinese: 段莹莹
Transcriptions
Standard Mandarin
- Hanyu Pinyin: Dùan Yíng Yíng
- IPA: [twán ǐŋ ǐŋ]

Duan Yingying (Chinese: 段莹莹; born 3 July 1989) is a former Chinese tennis player.

In her career, she won one singles title and three doubles titles on the WTA Tour, and two WTA 125 doubles titles, as well as eleven singles and three doubles titles on the ITF Women's Circuit. Her nickname is lightning for her amazing forehand.

On 24 April 2017, she reached her career-high singles ranking of world No. 60. On 3 February 2020, she peaked at No. 16 in the doubles rankings.

== Career ==
=== 2012 ===
Starting the year as the No. 378 in the world, Duan's ranking would improve significantly to No. 128 by the year's end. Some of the highlights of her 2012 season included winning four ITF titles at the 25k level in Wellington, Changwon, Gimcheon and Goyang. Playing qualifying at the US Open, Duan had her first experience in a Grand Slam tournament. She would win her first qualifying round defeating Réka Luca Jani, but would fall in the next round to Kirsten Flipkens. She received a wild card to the Guangzhou International and won her first WTA Tour main-draw match defeating Luksika Khumkum in the first round. Duan also achieved her best results in ITF events near the end of 2012, reaching the semifinals of 100k+H Ningbo and the finals of 100k Suzhou, losing both matches to top-100 veteran Hsieh Su-wei.

=== 2013: Major debut ===
Duan was due to make her major singles debut at Wimbledon but withdrew to compete in the National Games of China. She made her major singles debut in the main draw of the US Open, after winning three qualifying matches. However, she lost to sixth seed Caroline Wozniacki in the opening round. During the televised commentary of her match against Wozniacki, the commentators compared Duan's game to that of former world No. 1, Lindsay Davenport. They also began referring to her by the nickname of Duan-venport (段文波特) on the Chinese internet.

=== 2015: First major singles win ===
At Wimbledon, as a qualifier, Duan defeated 2014 finalist Eugenie Bouchard in straight sets in the first round. This was considered one of the biggest upsets of the tournament. In the second round, Duan lost to Tatjana Maria in a long three-set match.

=== 2016: First WTA Tour title ===
In July, she won her first WTA Tour title at the Jiangxi International Open, defeating Vania King in the final.

=== 2017: Elite Trophy doubles title ===
In the first-round match at the Shenzhen Open, Duan wasted three match points and eventually lost to first seed and world No. 3, Agnieszka Radwańska. At the Australian Open, she had her best Grand Slam performance to date by defeating Rebecca Šramková and Varvara Lepchenko to reach the third round, where she lost to former world No. 1 and eventual finalist, Venus Williams, 1–6, 0–6.

Duan won her first ever WTA Tour doubles title at the Elite Trophy with Han Xinyun.

=== 2018: Second doubles title ===
Duan won her second doubles title at the Taiwan Open, playing with Wang Yafan.

=== 2019: French Open finalist, Wuhan doubles title ===
Duan and Zheng Saisai reached the final of the French Open, losing to Tímea Babos and Kristina Mladenovic.

In September, they reached the quarterfinals of the US Open, however, they were beaten by the eventual champions, Elise Mertens and Aryna Sabalenka. The following week, with Zheng unavailable, she partnered with Veronika Kudermetova for the first time to win the doubles title at the Wuhan Open, beating Mertens and Sabalenka in the final.

=== 2021: Olympics participation ===
She partnered again with Zheng Saisai at the delayed Tokyo Olympics where they lost in the first round.

== Grand Slam performance timelines ==
Key
W	F	SF	QF	#R	RR	Q#	P#	DNQ	A	Z#	PO	G	S	B	NMS	NTI	P	NH

(W) winner; (F) finalist; (SF) semifinalist; (QF) quarterfinalist; (#R) rounds 4, 3, 2, 1; (RR) round-robin stage; (Q#) qualification round; (P#) preliminary round; (DNQ) did not qualify; (A) absent; (Z#) Davis/Fed Cup Zonal Group (with number indication) or (PO) play-off; (G) gold, (S) silver or (B) bronze Olympic/Paralympic medal; (NMS) not a Masters tournament; (NTI) not a Tier I tournament; (P) postponed; (NH) not held; (SR) strike rate (events won / competed); (W–L) win–loss record.
To avoid confusion and double counting, these charts are updated at the conclusion of a tournament or when the player's participation has ended.

=== Singles ===
Tournament	2012	2013	2014	2015	2016	2017	2018	2019	W–L
Australian Open	A	A	1R	1R	Q2	3R	2R	Q1	3–4
French Open	A	A	A	Q1	A	1R	1R	A	0–2
Wimbledon	A	A	A	2R	2R	1R	Q2	A	2–3
US Open	Q2	1R	1R	Q2	2R	2R	A	A	2–4
Win–Loss	0–0	0–1	0–2	1–2	2–2	3–4	1–2	0–0	7–13

=== Doubles ===
Tournament	2017	2018	2019	2020	2021	W–L
Australian Open	A	A	1R	1R	1R	0–3
French Open	3R	3R	F	A	A	9–3
Wimbledon	1R	1R	3R	NH	A	2–3
US Open	A	2R	QF	A	A	4–2
Win–Loss	2–2	3–3	10–4	0–1	0–1	15–11

== Grand Slam tournament finals ==
=== Doubles: 1 (runner-up) ===
Result	Year	Tournament	Surface	Partner	Opponents	Score
Loss	2019	French Open	Clay	(China) Zheng Saisai	(Hungary) Tímea Babos (France) Kristina Mladenovic	2–6, 3–6

== Other significant finals ==
=== WTA 1000 tournaments ===
==== Doubles: 1 (title) ====
Result	Year	Tournament	Surface	Partner	Opponents	Score
Win	2019	Wuhan Open	Hard	(Russia) Veronika Kudermetova	(Belgium) Elise Mertens (Belarus) Aryna Sabalenka	7–6^{(7–3)}, 6–2

=== WTA Elite Trophy ===
==== Doubles: 2 (1 title, 1 runner-up) ====
Result	Year	Tournament	Surface	Partner	Opponents	Score
Win	2017	Zhuhai, China	Hard (i)	(China) Han Xinyun	(China) Zhang Shuai (China) Lu Jingjing	6–2, 6–1
Loss	2019	Zhuhai, China	Hard (i)	(China) Yang Zhaoxuan	(Ukraine) Lyudmyla Kichenok (Slovenia) Andreja Klepač	3–6, 3–6

== WTA Tour finals ==
=== Singles: 1 (title) ===
Legend WTA 250 (1–0)	Finals by surface Hard (1–0)

Result	Date	Tournament	Tier	Surface	Opponent	Score
Win	Aug 2016	Jiangxi Open, China	International	Hard	(United States) Vania King	1–6, 6–4, 6–2

=== Doubles: 8 (3 titles, 5 runner-ups) ===
Legend Grand Slam (0–1) WTA Elite Trophy (1–1) WTA 1000 / Premier 5 (1–0) WTA 250 / International (1–3)	Finals by surface Hard (3–3) Clay (0–2)	Finals by setting Outdoor (1–4) Indoor (2–1)

Result	W–L	Date	Tournament	Tier	Surface	Partner	Opponents	Score
Win	1–0	Nov 2017	Zhuhai, China	Elite Trophy	Hard (i)	(China) Han Xinyun	(China) Lu Jingjing (China) Zhang Shuai	6–2, 6–1
Win	2–0	Feb 2018	Taipei Open, Taiwan	International	Hard (i)	(China) Wang Yafan	(Japan) Nao Hibino (Georgia (country)) Oksana Kalashnikova	7–6^{(7–4)}, 7–6^{(7–5)}
Loss	2–1	Jan 2019	Shenzhen Open, China	International	Hard	(Czech Republic) Renata Voráčová	(China) Peng Shuai (China) Yang Zhaoxuan	4–6, 3–6
Loss	2–2	May 2019	Internationaux de Strasbourg, France	International	Clay	(China) Han Xinyun	(Australia) Daria Gavrilova (Australia) Ellen Perez	4–6, 3–6
Loss	2–3	Jun 2019	French Open	Grand Slam	Clay	(China) Zheng Saisai	(Hungary) Tímea Babos (France) Kristina Mladenovic	2–6, 3–6
Win	3–3	Sep 2019	Wuhan Open, China	Premier 5	Hard	(Russia) Veronika Kudermetova	(Belgium) Elise Mertens (Belarus) Aryna Sabalenka	7–6^{(7–3)}, 6–2
Loss	3–4	Oct 2019	Zhuhai, China	Elite Trophy	Hard (i)	(China) Yang Zhaoxuan	(Ukraine) Lyudmyla Kichenok (Slovenia) Andreja Klepač	3–6, 3–6
Loss	3–5	Jan 2020	Shenzhen Open, China	International	Hard	(China) Zheng Saisai	(Czech Republic) Barbora Krejčíková (Czech Republic) Kateřina Siniaková	2–6, 6–3, [4–10]

== WTA 125 finals ==
=== Singles: 1 (runner-up) ===
Result	Date	Tournament	Surface	Opponent	Score
Loss	Sep 2014	Suzhou Ladies Open, China	Hard	(Germany) Anna-Lena Friedsam	1–6, 3–6

=== Doubles: 3 (2 titles, 1 runner-up) ===
Result	W–L	Date	Tournament	Surface	Partner	Opponents	Score
Win	1–0	Nov 2017	Hua Hin Challenger, Thailand	Hard	(China) Wang Yafan	(Slovenia) Dalila Jakupović (Russia) Irina Khromacheva	6–3, 6–3
Win	2–0	Apr 2018	Zhengzhou Open, China	Hard	(China) Wang Yafan	(United Kingdom) Naomi Broady (Belgium) Yanina Wickmayer	7–6^{(5)}, 6–3
Loss	2–1	Apr 2019	Kunming Open, China	Clay	(China) Han Xinyun	(China) Peng Shuai (China) Yang Zhaoxuan	5–7, 2–6

== ITF Circuit finals ==
Legend
$100,000 tournaments
$80,000 tournaments
$50/60,000 tournaments
$25,000 tournaments
$10,000 tournaments

=== Singles: 19 (11 titles, 8 runner-ups) ===
Result	W–L	Date	Tournament	Tier	Surface	Opponent	Score
Win	1–0	Feb 2009	ITF Jiangmen, China	10,000	Hard	(China) Xie Yanze	6–2, 6–4
Win	2–0	May 2009	ITF New Delhi, India	10,000	Hard	(Israel) Keren Shlomo	6–3, 6–4
Loss	2–1	Jun 2009	ITF Xiamen, China	25,000	Hard	(China) Zhang Shuai	2–6, 1–6
Win	3–1	Mar 2010	ITF Nanjing, China	10,000	Hard	(China) Liu Wanting	6–4, 7–6^{(6)}
Win	4–1	Jun 2010	ITF Hefei, China	10,000	Hard	(China) Zheng Saisai	6–3, 6–4
Loss	4–2	Aug 2010	ITF Saitama, Japan	10,000	Hard	(Chinese Taipei) Hsu Wen-hsin	1–6, 6–1, 3–6
Loss	4–3	Aug 2011	ITF Saitama, Japan	10,000	Hard	(Japan) Ayumi Oka	3–6, 4–6
Win	5–3	Feb 2012	ITF Wellington, New Zealand	25,000	Hard	(Poland) Sandra Zaniewska	6–1, 6–4
Win	6–3	May 2012	ITF Changwon, Korea	25,000	Hard	(Hong Kong) Zhang Ling	6–4, 6–3
Win	7–3	May 2012	ITF Gimcheon, Korea	25,000	Hard	(South Africa) Chanel Simmonds	6–2, 6–1
Win	8–3	Jun 2012	ITF Goyang, Korea	25,000	Hard	(Hong Kong) Zhang Ling	6–3, 6–3
Loss	8–4	Jul 2012	ITF Evansville, United States	10,000	Hard	(United States) Mallory Burdette	1–6, 2–6
Loss	8–5	Oct 2012	Suzhou Ladies Open, China	100,000	Hard	(Chinese Taipei) Hsieh Su-wei	2–6, 2–6
Win	9–5	May 2013	ITF Goyang, Korea (2)	25,000	Hard	(China) Liu Fangzhou	6–3, 6–4
Win	10–5	Jun 2014	ITF Xi'an, China	50,000	Hard	(China) Zhu Lin	4–6, 7–6^{(9)}, 6–4
Win	11–5	Jul 2015	ITF Tianjin, China	25,000	Hard	(China) Wang Qiang	4–6, 7–6^{(2)}, 3–0 ret.
Loss	11–6	Jul 2015	ITF Zhengzhou, China	25,000	Hard	(China) Wang Yafan	4–6, 4–6
Loss	11–7	Oct 2015	Suzhou Ladies Open, China	50,000	Hard	(China) Zhang Kailin	6–1, 3–6, 4–6
Loss	11–8	May 2019	Jin'an Open, China	W60	Hard	(China) Han Xinyun	4–6, 3–6

=== Doubles: 6 (3 titles, 3 runner-ups) ===
Result	W–L	Date	Tournament	Tier	Surface	Partner	Opponents	Score
Loss	0–1	May 2008	ITF Khon Kaen, Thailand	10,000	Hard	(China) Chen Hui	(South Korea) Kim Sun-jung (South Korea) Lee Cho-won	4–6, 6–4, [4–10]
Loss	0–2	Feb 2012	ITF Sydney, Australia	25,000	Hard	(China) Han Xinyun	(Australia) Arina Rodionova (United Kingdom) Melanie South	6–3, 3–6, [8–10]
Win	1–2	Jul 2012	ITF Evansville, US	10,000	Hard	(China) Xu Yifan	(United States) Mallory Burdette (United States) Natalie Pluskota	6–2, 6–3
Loss	1–3	Jul 2016	ITF Wuhan, China	50,000	Hard	(Chinese Taipei) Chang Kai-chen	(Japan) Shuko Aoyama (Japan) Makoto Ninomiya	4–6, 4–6
Win	2–3	May 2019	Kangaroo Cup Gifu, Japan	W80	Hard	(China) Han Xinyun	(Japan) Akiko Omae (Thailand) Peangtarn Plipuech	6–3, 4–6, [10–4]
Win	3–3	Jun 2019	Manchester Trophy, UK	W100	Grass	(China) Zhu Lin	(United States) Robin Anderson (Romania) Laura Ioana Paar	6–4, 6–3
