= Hsieh Su-wei career statistics =

Tennis statistics of Hsieh Su-wei

Career finals
Discipline	Type	Won	Lost	Total	WR
Singles	Grand Slam	–	–	–	–
Singles	Tour Championships	–	–	–	–
Singles	WTA 1000	–	–	–	–
Singles	WTA Tour	3	0	3	1.00
Singles	Olympics	–	–	–	–
Singles	Total	3	0	3	1.00
Doubles	Grand Slam	7	1	8	0.88
Doubles	Tour Championships	1	3	4	0.25
Doubles	WTA 1000	13	3	16	0.93
Doubles	WTA Tour	15	13	28	0.58
Doubles	Olympics	–	–	–	–
Doubles	Total	36	20	56	0.64
Mixed doubles	Grand Slam	1	0	1	1.00
Mixed doubles	Olympics	0	0	0	0.00
Mixed doubles	Total	1	0	1	1.00

This is a list of the main career statistics of professional Taiwanese tennis player Hsieh Su-wei. To date, Hsieh has won three singles and 35 doubles career titles, including seven Grand Slam doubles titles at the Wimbledon Championships in 2013, 2019, 2021 and 2023, as well as at the French Open in 2014 and 2023 alongside an Australian Open title in 2024. She has also won one WTA Finals doubles title in 2013, 12 WTA 1000 doubles titles. Hsieh has been a runner–up at the 2020 Australian Open, and a semifinalist at the 2012 US Open. She also holds a Grand Slam title in mixed doubles, where she won at the 2024 Australian Open. She reached her career-high doubles ranking of world No. 1 on 12 May 2014 and has spent a combined total of 47 weeks with the top ranking.

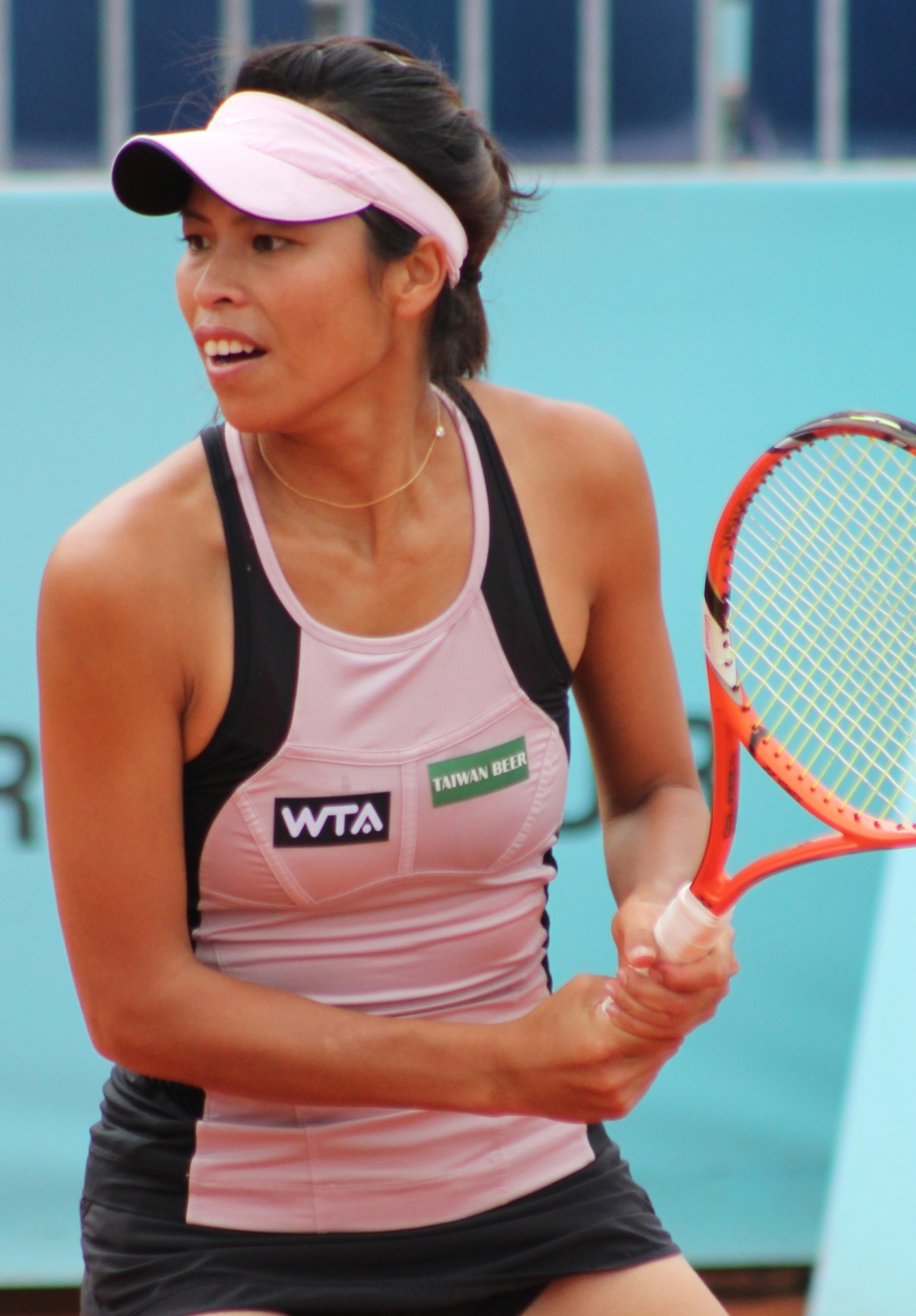
Hsieh at the 2014 Madrid Open

== Performance timelines ==
Key
W	F	SF	QF	#R	RR	Q#	P#	DNQ	A	Z#	PO	G	S	B	NMS	NTI	P	NH

(W) winner; (F) finalist; (SF) semifinalist; (QF) quarterfinalist; (#R) rounds 4, 3, 2, 1; (RR) round-robin stage; (Q#) qualification round; (P#) preliminary round; (DNQ) did not qualify; (A) absent; (Z#) Davis/Fed Cup Zonal Group (with number indication) or (PO) play-off; (G) gold, (S) silver or (B) bronze Olympic/Paralympic medal; (NMS) not a Masters tournament; (NTI) not a Tier I tournament; (P) postponed; (NH) not held; (SR) strike rate (events won / competed); (W–L) win–loss record.
To avoid confusion and double counting, these charts are updated at the conclusion of a tournament or when the player's participation has ended.

Only main-draw results in WTA Tour, Grand Slam tournaments, Fed Cup/Billie Jean King Cup and Olympic Games are included in win–loss records.

=== Singles ===
Current after the 2024 Australian Open.

Tournament	2001	2002	2003	2004	2005	2006	2007	2008	2009	2010	2011	2012	2013	2014	2015	2016	2017	2018	2019	2020	2021	2022	2023	2024	SR	W–L	Win %
Grand Slam tournaments
Australian Open	A	Q2	A	A	A	Q3	Q2	4R	1R	A	A	Q2	2R	1R	Q1	2R	2R	4R	3R	1R	QF	A	A	Q1	0 / 10	15–10	60%
French Open	A	Q3	A	A	A	1R	1R	1R	Q1	A	A	1R	1R	Q1	Q1	2R	3R	1R	2R	2R	1R	A	A	A	0 / 11	5–11	31%
Wimbledon	A	Q2	A	A	A	1R	1R	2R	A	A	A	3R	2R	1R	2R	1R	1R	4R	3R	NH	1R	A	Q3	A	0 / 12	10–12	45%
US Open	A	Q1	A	A	1R	Q3	Q3	2R	Q1	A	A	1R	2R	Q1	Q2	1R	Q3	2R	2R	A	2R	A	A	A	0 / 8	5–8	38%
Win–loss	0–0	0–0	0–0	0–0	0–1	0–2	0–2	5–4	0–1	0–0	0–0	2–3	3–4	0–2	1–1	2–4	3–3	7–4	6–4	1–2	5–4	0-0	0-0	0-0	0 / 41	35–41	46%
Year-end championships
WTA Elite Trophy (Note: WTA Tournament of Champions was held from 2009 to 2014, when WTA Elite Trophy replaced it.)	NH								DNQ			RR	DNQ					Alt	DNQ	NH		DNQ			0 / 1	1–2	33%
National representation
Summer Olympics	NH			A	NH			A	NH			1R	NH			A	NH				A	NH		A	0 / 1	0–1	0%
WTA 1000
Dubai / Qatar Open (Note: The first Premier 5 event of the year has switched back and forth between the Dubai Tennis Championships and the Qatar Ladies Open since 2009. Dubai was classified as a Premier 5 event from 2009 to 2011 before being succeeded by Doha for the 2012–2014 period. In 2015, Dubai regained its Premier 5 status while Doha was demoted to Premier status. The Premier 5 tournaments were reclassified as WTA 1000 tournaments in 2021. Starting in 2024, they will both become 1000 events.)	NMS							A	A	A	A	A	2R	2R	A	A	A	Q1	SF	1R	A	A	A	A	0 / 4	6–4	60%
Indian Wells Open	A	A	A	A	A	Q2	A	1R	A	A	A	A	2R	Q1	A	Q1	A	2R	2R	NH	2R	A	A	Q2	0 / 5	2–5	29%
Miami Open	A	A	A	A	A	A	A	Q1	A	A	A	Q2	2R	Q2	A	A	A	3R	QF	NH	A	A	A	Q1	0 / 3	6–3	67%
Madrid Open	NH								A	A	A	Q2	1R	A	A	A	A	A	1R	NH	1R	A	A	A	0 / 3	0–3	0%
Italian Open	A	A	A	A	A	A	A	A	Q2	A	A	Q2	1R	A	A	Q2	A	2R	1R	1R	Q1	A	A	A	0 / 4	1–4	20%
Canadian Open	A	A	A	A	A	A	A	A	A	A	A	A	1R	A	A	A	A	A	1R	NH	A	A	A	A	0 / 2	0–2	0%
Cincinnati Open	NH			NMS					A	Q2	A	A	1R	A	Q1	A	Q1	Q1	3R	A	1R	A	A	A	0 / 3	2–3	40%
Pan Pacific / Wuhan Open (Note: In 2014, the Pan Pacific Open was downgraded to a Premier event and replaced by the Wuhan Open. The Premier 5 tournaments were reclassified as WTA 1000 tournaments in 2021.)	A	A	A	A	A	Q1	A	A	A	A	A	1R	1R	A	A	A	A	1R	2R	NH		A	A	A	0 / 4	1–4	0%
China Open	NH			NMS					Q1	A	A	2R	1R	A	Q1	A	Q2	1R	1R	NH		A	A	A	0 / 4	1–4	20%
Career statistics
	2001	2002	2003	2004	2005	2006	2007	2008	2009	2010	2011	2012	2013	2014	2015	2016	2017	2018	2019	2020	2021	2022	2023	2024	Career		
Tournaments	2	1	0	0	3	4	7	8	2	2	1	15	25	12	5	12	15	19	24	7	14	0	1	0	Career total: 179		
Titles	0	0	0	0	0	0	0	0	0	0	0	2	0	0	0	0	0	1	0	0	0	0	0	0	Career total: 3		
Finals	0	0	0	0	0	0	0	0	0	0	0	2	0	0	0	0	0	1	0	0	0	0	0	0	Career total: 3		
Overall win–loss	5–2	0–1	0–0	0–0	0–3	0–4	1–7	5–8	1–2	0–2	1–1	21–14	13–25	6–12	6–5	12–12	8–15	32–17	31–24	1–7	9–14	0-0	0-1	0-0	3 / 179	152–176	46%
Year-end ranking	165	262	653	426	154	140	157	79	318	361	176	25	85	144	106	97	96	28	32	67	106	UNR	703		$11,379,695		

=== Doubles ===
Current after the 2026 Qatar Open.

Tournament	2005	2006	2007	2008	2009	2010	2011	2012	2013	2014	2015	2016	2017	2018	2019	2020	2021	2022	2023	2024	2025	2026	SR	W–L	Win %
Grand Slam tournaments
Australian Open	1R	2R	1R	2R	QF	3R	QF	2R	3R	2R	2R	3R	A	SF	2R	F	2R	A	A	W	F	QF	1 / 19	42–18	70%
French Open	A	A	2R	1R	SF	1R	1R	2R	2R	W	QF	1R	2R	1R	3R	3R	3R	A	W	2R	2R	2R	2 / 19	32–17	65%
Wimbledon	A	1R	1R	1R	1R	3R	1R	3R	W	3R	QF	1R	1R	3R	W	NH	W	A	W	SF	F	3R	4 / 19	46–15	75%
US Open	A	A	1R	1R	2R	2R	3R	SF	QF	3R	2R	A	3R	3R	3R	A	QF	A	SF	1R	1R		0 / 16	27–16	63%
Win–loss	0–1	1–2	1–4	1–4	8–4	5–4	5–4	8–4	12–3	11–3	8–4	2–3	3–3	8–4	11–3	7–2	12–3	–	16–1	11–3	5–1		7 / 66	134–59	69%
National representation
Summer Olympics	NH			A	NH			QF	NH			A	NH				A	NH		QF	NH		0 / 2	3–2	60%
Year-end championships
WTA Finals	Did Not Qualify								W	F	DNQ				F	NH	F	DNQ		RR	SF		1 / 5	11–7	61%
WTA 1000 + former Tier I/Premier 5
Qatar Open	NMS			A	NMS			1R	1R	W	NMS	A	NMS	1R	NMS	W	NMS	A	NMS	QF	1R	F	2 / 8	11–6	65%
Dubai Open	NMS				A	A	A	NMS			2R	NMS	A	NMS	W	NMS	A	NMS	A	2R	F	A	1 / 4	7–3	70%
Indian Wells Open	A	A	A	1R	2R	1R	1R	1R	SF	W	1R	1R	A	W	QF	NH	W	A	A	W	SF	A	4 / 14	29–10	74%
Miami Open	A	A	A	1R	A	1R	2R	1R	2R	1R	2R	2R	A	1R	2R	NH	A	A	A	QF	A	A	0 / 11	7–11	41%
Madrid Open	NH				QF	1R	QF	2R	1R	SF	QF	1R	A	2R	W	NH	2R	A	QF	SF	SF	QF	1 / 13	24–12	67%
Italian Open	A	A	A	A	W	A	1R	1R	W	2R	QF	2R	A	QF	2R	W	2R	A	1R	QF	2R	2R	3 / 15	22–12	65%
Canadian Open	A	A	A	A	2R	1R	QF	A	1R	SF	A	A	A	A	QF	NH	A	A	A	A	SF	SF	0 / 8	11–8	58%
Cincinnati Open	NMS				2R	2R	1R	A	W	2R	SF	A	F	1R	2R	A	2R	A	2R	2R	1R		1 / 13	17–12	59%
Pan Pacific / Wuhan Open	A	A	A	SF	QF	1R	1R	QF	SF	A	1R	A	A	2R	2R	NH				A	A		0 / 9	7–9	44%
China Open	NMS				W	2R	2R	2R	SF	A	1R	A	2R	1R	2R	NH			1R	1R	SF		1 / 10	11–10	52%
Southern California Open	A	A	QF	NH		NMS				NH	NMS		NH					NMS					0 / 1	2–1	67%
Career statistics
	2005	2006	2007	2008	2009	2010	2011	2012	2013	2014	2015	2016	2017	2018	2019	2020	2021	2022	2023	2024	2025	2026	SR	W–L	Win%
Tournaments	8	6	12	13	15	18	19	20	22	19	14	11	11	18	19	6	14	–	10	18	3		Career total: 264		
Titles	0	0	2	2	3	0	1	1	5	3	0	0	2	1	4	4	2	–	2	3	0		Career total: 35		
Finals	0	0	4	4	3	0	1	1	5	4	1	0	3	4	6	5	3	–	2	3	4		Career total: 55		
Overall win–loss	36–12	33–14	34–15	27–15	29–14	20–22	24–21	27–21	41–16	30–16	19–14	22–14	25–10	27–17	36–14	23–2	26–12	–	21–8	34–16	36–18		35 / 262	592–284	68%
Year-end ranking	135	102	46	53	9	46	35	25	3	5	26	96	32	17	4	1	3	–	6	7	9		$11,379,695		

=== Mixed doubles ===
Current after the 2026 Australian Open.

Tournament	2009	2010	2011	2012	2013	2014	2015	2016	...	2019	2020	2021	2022	2023	2024	2025	SR	W–L
Australian Open	A	A	A	2R	QF	1R	SF	2R	A	A	2R	A	A	A	W	2R	1 / 8	14–7
French Open	2R	2R	1R	A	2R	A	A	A		A	NH	A	A	2R	SF	A	0 / 6	7-6
Wimbledon	QF	3R	SF	QF	1R	A	A	A		2R	NH	A	A	A	W	QF	1 / 8	20–6
US Open	SF	1R	A	1R	A	A	QF	A		1R	NH	A	A	2R	QF		0 / 7	8–7
Win–loss	7–3	3–3	4–2	4–3	3–3	0–1	5–2	1–1		1–2	1–1	0–0	0–0	2–2	15-2	1-1	2 / 27	42–25

== Grand Slam tournaments finals ==
=== Doubles: 10 (7 titles, 3 runner-ups) ===
Result	Year	Tournament	Surface	Partner	Opponents	Score
Win	2013	Wimbledon	Grass	(China) Peng Shuai	(Australia) Ashleigh Barty (Australia) Casey Dellacqua	7–6^{(7–1)}, 6–1
Win	2014	French Open	Clay	(China) Peng Shuai	(Italy) Sara Errani (Italy) Roberta Vinci	6–4, 6–1
Win	2019	Wimbledon (2)	Grass	(Czech Republic) Barbora Strýcová	(Canada) Gabriela Dabrowski (China) Xu Yifan	6–2, 6–4
Loss	2020	Australian Open	Hard	(Czech Republic) Barbora Strýcová	(Hungary) Tímea Babos (France) Kristina Mladenovic	2–6, 1–6
Win	2021	Wimbledon (3)	Grass	(Belgium) Elise Mertens	(Russia) Veronika Kudermetova (Russia) Elena Vesnina	3–6, 7–5, 9–7
Win	2023	French Open (2)	Clay	(China) Wang Xinyu	(Canada) Leylah Fernandez (United States) Taylor Townsend	1–6, 7–6^{(7–5)}, 6–1
Win	2023	Wimbledon (4)	Grass	(Czech Republic) Barbora Strýcová	(Australia) Storm Hunter (Belgium) Elise Mertens	7–5, 6–4
Win	2024	Australian Open	Hard	(Belgium) Elise Mertens	(Ukraine) Lyudmyla Kichenok (Latvia) Jeļena Ostapenko	6–1, 7–5
Loss	2025	Australian Open	Hard	(Latvia) Jeļena Ostapenko	(Czech Republic) Kateřina Siniaková (United States) Taylor Townsend	2–6, 7–6^{(7–4)}, 3–6
Loss	2025	Wimbledon	Grass	(Latvia) Jeļena Ostapenko	Veronika Kudermetova (Belgium) Elise Mertens	6–3, 2–6, 4–6

=== Mixed doubles: 2 (2 titles) ===
Result	Year	Tournament	Surface	Partner	Opponents	Score
Win	2024	Australian Open	Hard	(Poland) Jan Zieliński	(United States) Desirae Krawczyk (United Kingdom) Neal Skupski	6–7^{(5–7)}, 6–4, [11–9]
Win	2024	Wimbledon	Grass	(Poland) Jan Zieliński	(Mexico) Giuliana Olmos (Mexico) Santiago González	6–4, 6–2

== Other significant finals ==
=== Year-end championships ===
==== Doubles: 4 (1 title, 3 runner-ups) ====
Result	Year	Tournament	Surface	Partner	Opponents	Score
Win	2013	WTA Finals, Turkiye	Hard (i)	(China) Peng Shuai	(Russia) Ekaterina Makarova (Russia) Elena Vesnina	6–4, 7–5
Loss	2014	WTA Finals, Singapore	Hard (i)	(China) Peng Shuai	(Zimbabwe) Cara Black (India) Sania Mirza	1–6, 0–6
Loss	2019	WTA Finals, China	Hard (i)	(Czech Republic) Barbora Strýcová	(Hungary) Tímea Babos (France) Kristina Mladenovic	1–6, 3–6
Loss	2021	WTA Finals, Mexico	Hard	(Belgium) Elise Mertens	(Czech Republic) Barbora Krejčíková (Czech Republic) Kateřina Siniaková	3–6, 4–6

=== WTA 1000 tournaments ===
==== Doubles: 16 (13 titles, 3 runner-ups) ====
Result	Year	Tournament	Surface	Partner	Opponents	Score
Win	2009	Italian Open	Clay	(China) Peng Shuai	(Slovakia) Daniela Hantuchová (Japan) Ai Sugiyama	7–5, 7–6^{(7–5)}
Win	2009	China Open	Hard	(China) Peng Shuai	(Russia) Alla Kudryavtseva (Russia) Ekaterina Makarova	6–3, 6–1
Win	2013	Italian Open (2)	Clay	(China) Peng Shuai	(Italy) Sara Errani (Italy) Roberta Vinci	4–6, 6–3, [10–8]
Win	2013	Cincinnati Open	Hard	(China) Peng Shuai	(Germany) Anna-Lena Grönefeld (Czech Republic) Květa Peschke	2–6, 6–3, [12–10]
Win	2014	Qatar Ladies Open	Hard	(China) Peng Shuai	(Czech Republic) Květa Peschke (Slovenia) Katarina Srebotnik	6–4, 6–0
Win	2014	Indian Wells Open	Hard	(China) Peng Shuai	(Zimbabwe) Cara Black (India) Sania Mirza	7–6^{(7–5)}, 6–2
Loss	2017	Cincinnati Open	Hard	(Romania) Monica Niculescu	(Chinese Taipei) Latisha Chan (Switzerland) Martina Hingis	6–4, 4–6, [7–10]
Win	2018	Indian Wells Open (2)	Hard	(Czech Republic) Barbora Strýcová	(Russia) Ekaterina Makarova (Russia) Elena Vesnina	6–4, 6–4
Win	2019	Dubai Open	Hard	(Czech Republic) Barbora Strýcová	(Czech Republic) Lucie Hradecká (Russia) Ekaterina Makarova	6–4, 6–4
Win	2019	Madrid Open	Clay	(Czech Republic) Barbora Strýcová	(Canada) Gabriela Dabrowski (China) Xu Yifan	6–3, 6–1
Win	2020	Qatar Ladies Open (2)	Hard	(Czech Republic) Barbora Strýcová	(Canada) Gabriela Dabrowski (Latvia) Jeļena Ostapenko	6–2, 5–7, [10–2]
Win	2020	Italian Open (3)	Clay	(Czech Republic) Barbora Strýcová	(Germany) Anna-Lena Friedsam (Romania) Raluca Olaru	6–2, 6–2
Win	2021	Indian Wells Open (3)	Hard	(Belgium) Elise Mertens	(Russia) Veronika Kudermetova (Kazakhstan) Elena Rybakina	7–6^{(7–1)}, 6–3
Win	2024	Indian Wells Open (4)	Hard	(Belgium) Elise Mertens	(Australia) Storm Hunter (Czech Republic) Kateřina Siniaková	6–3, 6–4
Loss	2025	Dubai Open	Hard	(Latvia) Jeļena Ostapenko	(Czech Republic) Kateřina Siniaková (United States) Taylor Townsend	6–7^{(5–7)}, 4–6
Loss	2026	Qatar Ladies Open	Hard	(Latvia) Jeļena Ostapenko	(Kazakhstan) Anna Danilina (Serbia) Aleksandra Krunić	6–0, 6–7^{(3–7)}, [8–10]

== WTA Tour finals ==
=== Singles: 3 (3 titles) ===
Legend Grand Slam (–) WTA 1000 (–) WTA 500 (–) WTA 250 / International (3–0)	Finals by surface Hard (3–0) Clay (–) Grass (–)	Finals by setting Outdoor (3–0) Indoor (–)

Result	W–L	Date	Tournament	Tier	Surface	Opponent	Score
Win	1–0	Mar 2012	Malaysian Open, Malaysia	International	Hard	(Croatia) Petra Martić	2–6, 7–5, 4–1 ret.
Win	2–0	Sep 2012	Guangzhou Open, China	International	Hard	(United Kingdom) Laura Robson	6–3, 5–7, 6–4
Win	3–0	Sep 2018	Japan Women's Open, Japan	International	Hard	(United States) Amanda Anisimova	6–2, 6–2

=== Doubles: 56 (36 titles, 20 runner-ups) ===
Legend (pre/post 2009) Grand Slam (7–3) WTA Finals (1–3) WTA 1000 / Premier 5 & Mandatory (13–3) WTA 500 / Tier II / Premier (6–4) WTA 250 / Tier III, IV & V / International (9–7)	Finals by surface Hard (23–18) Clay (6–0) Grass (7–2)	Finals by setting Outdoor (33–18) Indoor (3–2)

Result	W–L	Date	Tournament	Tier	Surface	Partner	Opponents	Score
Loss	0–1	Oct 2004	Korea Open, South Korea	Tier IV	Hard	(Chinese Taipei) Chuang Chia-jung	(South Korea) Cho Yoon-jeong (South Korea) Jeon Mi-ra	3–6, 6–1, 5–7
Loss	0–2	Jan 2007	Auckland Classic, New Zealand	Tier IV	Hard	(India) Shikha Uberoi	(Slovakia) Janette Husárová (Argentina) Paola Suárez	0–6, 2–6
Loss	0–3	Feb 2007	Bangalore Open, India	Tier III	Hard	(Russia) Alla Kudryavtseva	(Chinese Taipei) Chan Yung-jan (Chinese Taipei) Chuang Chia-jung	7–6^{(7–4)}, 2–6, [9–11]
Win	1–3	Sep 2007	China Open, China	Tier II	Hard	(Chinese Taipei) Chuang Chia-jung	(China) Han Xinyun (China) Xu Yifan	7–6^{(7–2)}, 6–2
Win	2–3	Sep 2007	Korea Open, South Korea	Tier IV	Hard	(Chinese Taipei) Chuang Chia-jung	(Greece) Eleni Daniilidou (Germany) Jasmin Wöhr	6–2, 6–2
Loss	2–4	Feb 2008	PTT Pattaya Open, Thailand	Tier IV	Hard	(United States) Vania King	(Chinese Taipei) Chan Yung-jan (Chinese Taipei) Chuang Chia-jung	4–6, 3–6
Loss	2–5	Aug 2008	Cincinnati Open, U.S.	Tier III	Hard	(Kazakhstan) Yaroslava Shvedova	(Russia) Maria Kirilenko (Russia) Nadia Petrova	3–6, 6–4, [8–10]
Win	3–5	Sep 2008	Bali International, Indonesia	Tier III	Hard	(China) Peng Shuai	(Poland) Marta Domachowska (Russia) Nadia Petrova	6–7^{(4–7)}, 7–6^{(7–3)}, [10–7]
Win	4–5	Sep 2008	Korea Open, South Korea (2)	Tier IV	Hard	(Chinese Taipei) Chuang Chia-jung	(Russia) Vera Dushevina (Russia) Maria Kirilenko	6–3, 6–0
Win	5–5	Jan 2009	Sydney International, Australia	Premier	Hard	(China) Peng Shuai	(France) Nathalie Dechy (Australia) Casey Dellacqua	6–0, 6–1
Win	6–5	May 2009	Italian Open, Italy	Premier 5	Clay	(China) Peng Shuai	(Slovakia) Daniela Hantuchová (Japan) Ai Sugiyama	7–5, 7–6^{(7–5)}
Win	7–5	Oct 2009	China Open, China (2)	Premier M	Hard	(China) Peng Shuai	(Russia) Alla Kudryavtseva (Russia) Ekaterina Makarova	6–3, 6–1
Win	8–5	Sep 2011	Guangzhou Open, China	International	Hard	(China) Zheng Saisai	(Chinese Taipei) Chan Chin-wei (China) Han Xinyun	6–2, 6–1
Win	9–5	Jun 2012	Birmingham Classic, UK	International	Grass	(Hungary) Tímea Babos	(United States) Liezel Huber (United States) Lisa Raymond	7–5, 6–7^{(2–7)}, [10–8]
Win	10–5	May 2013	Italian Open, Italy (2)	Premier 5	Clay	(China) Peng Shuai	(Italy) Sara Errani (Italy) Roberta Vinci	4–6, 6–3, [10–8]
Win	11–5	Jul 2013	Wimbledon, UK	Grand Slam	Grass	(China) Peng Shuai	(Australia) Ashleigh Barty (Australia) Casey Dellacqua	7–6^{(7–1)}, 6–1
Win	12–5	Aug 2013	Cincinnati Open, U.S.	Premier 5	Hard	(China) Peng Shuai	(Germany) Anna-Lena Grönefeld (Czech Republic) Květa Peschke	2–6, 6–3, [12–10]
Win	13–5	Sep 2013	Guangzhou Open, China (2)	International	Hard	(China) Peng Shuai	(United States) Vania King (Kazakhstan) Galina Voskoboeva	6–3, 4–6, [12–10]
Win	14–5	Oct 2013	WTA Finals, Turkey	Finals	Hard (i)	(China) Peng Shuai	(Russia) Ekaterina Makarova (Russia) Elena Vesnina	6–4, 7–5
Win	15–5	Feb 2014	Qatar Open, Qatar	Premier 5	Hard	(China) Peng Shuai	(Czech Republic) Květa Peschke (Slovenia) Katarina Srebotnik	6–4, 6–0
Win	16–5	Mar 2014	Indian Wells Open, U.S.	Premier M	Hard	(China) Peng Shuai	(Zimbabwe) Cara Black (India) Sania Mirza	7–6^{(7–5)}, 6–2
Win	17–5	Jun 2014	French Open, France	Grand Slam	Clay	(China) Peng Shuai	(Italy) Sara Errani (Italy) Roberta Vinci	6–4, 6–1
Loss	17–6	Oct 2014	WTA Finals, Singapore	Finals	Hard (i)	(China) Peng Shuai	(Zimbabwe) Cara Black (India) Sania Mirza	1–6, 0–6
Loss	17–7	Feb 2015	Qatar Open, Qatar	Premier	Hard	(India) Sania Mirza	(United States) Raquel Kops-Jones (United States) Abigail Spears	4–6, 4–6
Win	18–7	Feb 2017	Hungarian Ladies Open, Hungary	International	Hard (i)	(Georgia (country)) Oksana Kalashnikova	(Australia) Arina Rodionova (Kazakhstan) Galina Voskoboeva	6–3, 4–6, [10–4]
Win	19–7	Apr 2017	Open Biel Bienne, Switzerland	International	Hard (i)	(Romania) Monica Niculescu	(Switzerland) Timea Bacsinszky (Switzerland) Martina Hingis	5–7, 6–3, [10–7]
Loss	19–8	Aug 2017	Cincinnati Open, U.S.	Premier 5	Hard	(Romania) Monica Niculescu	(Chinese Taipei) Chan Yung-jan (Switzerland) Martina Hingis	6–4, 4–6, [7–10]
Loss	19–9	Feb 2018	Dubai Championships, UAE	Premier	Hard	(China) Peng Shuai	(Chinese Taipei) Chan Hao-ching (China) Yang Zhaoxuan	6–4, 2–6, [6–10]
Win	20–9	Mar 2018	Indian Wells Open, U.S. (2)	Premier M	Hard	(Czech Republic) Barbora Strýcová	(Russia) Ekaterina Makarova (Russia) Elena Vesnina	6–4, 6–4
Loss	20–10	Aug 2018	Connecticut Open, U.S.	Premier	Hard	(Germany) Laura Siegemund	(Czech Republic) Andrea Sestini Hlaváčková (Czech Republic) Barbora Strýcová	4–6, 7–6^{(9–7)}, [4–10]
Loss	20–11	Sep 2018	Korea Open, South Korea	International	Hard	(Chinese Taipei) Hsieh Shu-ying	(South Korea) Choi Ji-hee (South Korea) Han Na-lae	3–6, 2–6
Win	21–11	Feb 2019	Dubai Championships, UAE	Premier 5	Hard	(Czech Republic) Barbora Strýcová	(Czech Republic) Lucie Hradecká (Russia) Ekaterina Makarova	6–4, 6–4
Win	22–11	May 2019	Madrid Open, Spain	Premier M	Clay	(Czech Republic) Barbora Strýcová	(Canada) Gabriela Dabrowski (China) Xu Yifan	6–3, 6–1
Win	23–11	Jun 2019	Birmingham Classic, UK (2)	Premier	Grass	(Czech Republic) Barbora Strýcová	(Germany) Anna-Lena Grönefeld (Netherlands) Demi Schuurs	6–4, 6–7^{(4–7)}, [10–8]
Win	24–11	Jul 2019	Wimbledon, UK (2)	Grand Slam	Grass	(Czech Republic) Barbora Strýcová	(Canada) Gabriela Dabrowski (China) Xu Yifan	6–2, 6–4
Loss	24–12	Sep 2019	Pan Pacific Open, Japan	Premier	Hard	(Chinese Taipei) Hsieh Yu-chieh	(Chinese Taipei) Latisha Chan (Chinese Taipei) Chan Hao-ching	5–7, 5–7
Loss	24–13	Nov 2019	WTA Finals, China	Finals	Hard (i)	(Czech Republic) Barbora Strýcová	(Hungary) Tímea Babos (France) Kristina Mladenovic	1–6, 3–6
Win	25–13	Jan 2020	Brisbane International, Australia	Premier	Hard	(Czech Republic) Barbora Strýcová	(Australia) Ashleigh Barty (Netherlands) Kiki Bertens	3–6, 7–6^{(9–7)}, [10–8]
Loss	25–14	Jan 2020	Australian Open, Australia	Grand Slam	Hard	(Czech Republic) Barbora Strýcová	(Hungary) Tímea Babos (France) Kristina Mladenovic	2–6, 1–6
Win	26–14	Feb 2020	Dubai Championships, UAE (2)	Premier	Hard	(Czech Republic) Barbora Strýcová	(Czech Republic) Barbora Krejčíková (China) Zheng Saisai	7–5, 3–6, [10–5]
Win	27–14	Feb 2020	Qatar Open, Qatar (2)	Premier 5	Hard	(Czech Republic) Barbora Strýcová	(Canada) Gabriela Dabrowski (Latvia) Jeļena Ostapenko	6–2, 5–7, [10–2]
Win	28–14	Sep 2020	Italian Open, Italy (3)	Premier 5	Clay	(Czech Republic) Barbora Strýcová	(Germany) Anna-Lena Friedsam (Romania) Raluca Olaru	6–2, 6–2
Win	29–14	Jul 2021	Wimbledon, UK (3)	Grand Slam	Grass	(Belgium) Elise Mertens	(Russia) Veronika Kudermetova (Russia) Elena Vesnina	3–6, 7–5, 9–7
Win	30–14	Oct 2021	Indian Wells Open, U.S. (3)	WTA 1000	Hard	(Belgium) Elise Mertens	(Russia) Veronika Kudermetova (Kazakhstan) Elena Rybakina	7–6^{(7–1)}, 6–3
Loss	30–15	Nov 2021	WTA Finals, Mexico	Finals	Hard	(Belgium) Elise Mertens	(Czech Republic) Barbora Krejčíková (Czech Republic) Kateřina Siniaková	3–6, 4–6
Win	31–15	Jun 2023	French Open, France (2)	Grand Slam	Clay	(China) Wang Xinyu	(Canada) Leylah Fernandez (United States) Taylor Townsend	1–6, 7–6^{(7–5)}, 6–1
Win	32–15	Jul 2023	Wimbledon, UK (4)	Grand Slam	Grass	(Czech Republic) Barbora Strýcová	(Australia) Storm Hunter (Belgium) Elise Mertens	7–5, 6–4
Win	33–15	Jan 2024	Australian Open, Australia	Grand Slam	Hard	(Belgium) Elise Mertens	(Ukraine) Lyudmyla Kichenok (Latvia) Jeļena Ostapenko	6–1, 7–5
Win	34–15	Mar 2024	Indian Wells Open, U.S. (4)	WTA 1000	Hard	(Belgium) Elise Mertens	(Australia) Storm Hunter (Czech Republic) Kateřina Siniaková	6–3, 6–4
Win	35–15	Jun 2024	Birmingham Classic, UK (3)	WTA 250	Grass	(Belgium) Elise Mertens	(Japan) Miyu Kato (China) Zhang Shuai	6–1, 6–3
Loss	35–16	Jan 2025	Australian Open, Australia	Grand Slam	Hard	(Latvia) Jeļena Ostapenko	(Czech Republic) Kateřina Siniaková (United States) Taylor Townsend	2–6, 7–6^{(7–4)}, 3–6
Loss	35–17	Feb 2025	Dubai Championships, UAE	WTA 1000	Hard	(Latvia) Jeļena Ostapenko	(Czech Republic) Kateřina Siniaková (United States) Taylor Townsend	6–7^{(5–7)}, 4–6
Loss	35–18	Jun 2025	Eastbourne Open, UK	WTA 250	Grass	(Australia) Maya Joint	(Czech Republic) Marie Bouzková (Kazakhstan) Anna Danilina	4–6, 5–7
Loss	35–19	Jul 2025	Wimbledon, UK	Grand Slam	Grass	(Latvia) Jeļena Ostapenko	Veronika Kudermetova (Belgium) Elise Mertens	6–3, 2–6, 4–6
Win	36–19	Jan 2026	Brisbane International, Australia (2)	WTA 500	Hard	(Latvia) Jeļena Ostapenko	(Spain) Cristina Bucșa (Australia) Ellen Perez	6–2, 6–1
Loss	36–20	Feb 2026	Qatar Open, Qatar	WTA 1000	Hard	(Latvia) Jeļena Ostapenko	(Kazakhstan) Anna Danilina (Serbia) Aleksandra Krunić	6–0, 6–7^{(3–7)}, [8–10]

== WTA Challenger finals ==
=== Singles: 1 (runner–up) ===
Result	Date	Tournament	Surface	Opponent	Score
Loss	Nov 2017	WTA 125 Hua Hin, Thailand	Hard	(Switzerland) Belinda Bencic	3–6, 4–6

=== Doubles: 1 (title) ===
Result	Date	Tournament	Surface	Partner	Opponents	Score
Win	Nov 2017	WTA 125 Honolulu, United States	Hard	(Chinese Taipei) Hsieh Shu-ying	(Japan) Eri Hozumi (United States) Asia Muhammad	6–1, 7–6^{(7–3)}

== ITF Circuit finals ==
=== Singles: 31 (27 titles, 4 runner–ups) ===
Legend $100,000 tournaments (4–1) $75,000 tournaments (1–1) $50,000 tournaments (1–0) $25,000 tournaments (16–2) $10,000 tournaments (5–0)	Finals by surface Hard (21–3) Clay (1–1) Grass (2–0) Carpet (3–0)

Result	W–L	Date	Tournament	Tier	Surface	Opponent	Score
Win	1–0	Feb 2001	ITF Wellington, New Zealand	10,000	Hard	(New Zealand) Shelley Stephens	6–2, 6–4
Win	2–0	Mar 2001	ITF Kaohsiung, Taiwan	10,000	Hard	(Chinese Taipei) Chuang Chia-jung	6–4, 3–6, 6–3
Win	3–0	Aug 2001	ITF Bangkok, Thailand	10,000	Hard	(Indonesia) Angelique Widjaja	7–6^{(4)}, 6–2
Win	4–0	Aug 2001	ITF Bangkok, Thailand	10,000	Hard	(Thailand) Napaporn Tongsalee	6–3, 6–2
Win	5–0	Sep 2001	ITF Peachtree City, U.S.	25,000	Hard	(Canada) Marie-Ève Pelletier	6–4, 3–6, 6–4
Win	6–0	Aug 2003	ITF Saitama, Japan	10,000	Hard (i)	(Japan) Ryoko Takemura	6–3, 6–2
Loss	6–1	May 2004	ITF Seoul, South Korea	25,000	Hard	(South Korea) Kim Jin-hee	2–6, 4–6
Win	7–1	Jun 2005	ITF Gunma, Japan	25,000	Carpet	(Japan) Seiko Okamoto	6–1, 6–2
Win	8–1	Jun 2005	ITF Seoul, South Korea	25,000	Hard	(South Korea) Kim Jin-hee	6–2, 2–6, 6–3
Win	9–1	Jun 2005	ITF Incheon, South Korea	25,000	Hard	(South Korea) Yoo Mi	6–1, 6–2
Win	10–1	Jul 2005	ITF Kurume, Japan	25,000	Grass	(Japan) Erika Takao	6–2, 6–3
Win	11–1	Nov 2006	ITF Sutama, Japan	25,000	Clay	(Chinese Taipei) Chuang Chia-jung	6–4, 6–3
Loss	11–2	Nov 2006	ITF Kaohsiung, Taiwan	75,000	Hard	(Chinese Taipei) Chan Yung-jan	7–5, 6–7^{(6)}, 0–6
Win	12–2	Mar 2007	ITF Redding, U.S.	25,000	Hard	(Russia) Ekaterina Afinogenova	6–3, 6–7^{(4)}, 7–6^{(5)}
Win	13–2	May 2007	ITF Gimcheon, South Korea	25,000	Hard	(Chinese Taipei) Chan Chin-wei	6–2, 6–4
Win	14–2	Apr 2008	ITF Incheon, South Korea	25,000	Hard	(China) Xie Yanze	6–1, 6–1
Win	15–2	Sep 2008	ITF Tsukuba, Japan	25,000	Hard	(China) Xie Yanze	4–6, 6–3, 6–0
Win	16–2	Oct 2008	ITF Makinohara, Japan	25,000	Carpet	(Japan) Akiko Yonemura	6–1, 3–6, 6–3
Win	17–2	Sep 2009	ITF Makinohara, Japan	25,000	Carpet	(Japan) Misaki Doi	2–6, 7–5, 7–6^{(4)}
Win	18–2	Feb 2011	ITF Mildura, Australia	25,000	Grass	(United Kingdom) Katie O'Brien	6–1, 6–2
Loss	18–3	Jul 2011	ITF Fergana, Uzbekistan	25,000	Hard	(Indonesia) Ayu Fani Damayanti	3–6, 4–6
Win	19–3	Aug 2011	ITF Beijing, China	75,000	Hard	(Japan) Kurumi Nara	6–2, 6–2
Win	20–3	Oct 2011	ITF Seoul, South Korea	25,000	Hard	(Japan) Yurika Sema	6–1, 6–0
Win	21–3	Apr 2012	ITF Wenshan, China	50,000	Hard	(China) Zheng Saisai	6–3, 6–3
Win	22–3	Sep 2012	ITF Ningbo, China	100,000	Hard	(China) Zhang Shuai	6–2, 6–2
Win	23–3	Oct 2012	ITF Suzhou, China	100,000	Hard	(China) Duan Yingying	6–2, 6–2
Win	24–3	Apr 2015	ITF Pingshan, China	25,000	Hard	(China) Yang Zhaoxuan	6–2, 6–2
Win	25–3	May 2015	ITF Nanning, China	25,000	Hard	(South Korea) Jang Su-jeong	6–2, 6–3
Win	26–3	Nov 2015	ITF Nanjing, China	100,000	Hard	(Kazakhstan) Yulia Putintseva	7–6^{(5)}, 2–6, 6–2
Loss	26–4	Jun 2016	ITF Marseille, France	100,000	Clay	(Montenegro) Danka Kovinić	2–6, 3–6
Win	27–4	Dec 2016	ITF Dubai, UAE	100,000+H	Hard	(Russia) Natalia Vikhlyantseva	6–2, 6–2

=== Doubles: 38 (23 titles, 15 runner–ups) ===
Legend
$100,000 tournaments (3–2)
$75,000 tournaments (0–1)
$50,000 tournaments (6–2)
$25,000 tournaments (11–6)
$10,000 tournaments (3–4)

Result	W–L	Date	Tournament	Tier	Surface	Partner	Opponents	Score
Loss	0–1	Jan 2001	ITF Wellington, New Zealand	10,000	Hard	(Germany) Annette Kolb	(Australia) Donna McIntyre (New Zealand) Shelley Stephens	5–7, 6–0, 2–6
Win	1–1	Aug 2001	ITF Bangkok, Thailand	10,000	Hard	(Chinese Taipei) Chan Chin-wei	(South Korea) Chae Kyung-yee (South Korea) Kim Jin-hee	6–1, 6–3
Win	2–1	Apr 2002	ITF Gunma, Japan	10,000	Carpet	(Chinese Taipei) Chan Chin-wei	(Japan) Kumiko Iijima (Japan) Mari Inoue	6–0, 6–1
Loss	2–2	Apr 2002	ITF Seoul, South Korea	25,000	Hard	(Chinese Taipei) Chan Chin-wei	(South Korea) Choi Jin-young (South Korea) Kim Mi-ok	2–6, 6–7^{(5)}
Loss	2–3	Aug 2003	ITF Saitama, Japan	10,000	Hard	(Japan) Mari Inoue	(South Korea) Chang Kyung-mi (Japan) Ryoko Takemura	2–6, 2–6
Loss	2–4	Aug 2003	ITF Fukuoka, Japan	10,000	Hard	(Japan) Mari Inoue	(South Korea) Tomoko Taira (Japan) Mayumi Yamamoto	1–6, 4–6
Loss	2–5	Sep 2003	ITF Kyoto, Japan	10,000	Carpet (i)	(Japan) Mari Inoue	(South Korea) Chang Kyung-mi (Japan) Ryoko Takemura	5–7, 5–7
Win	3–5	Jun 2004	ITF Incheon, South Korea	25,000	Hard	(Chinese Taipei) Chan Chin-wei	(South Korea) Choi Jin-young (South Korea) Kim Mi-ok	6–2, 6–0
Win	4–5	Aug 2004	ITF New Delhi, India	25,000	Hard	(Chinese Taipei) Chuang Chia-jung	(Uzbekistan) Akgul Amanmuradova (India) Sania Mirza	7–6^{(8)}, 6–4
Loss	4–6	Oct 2004	ITF Haibara, Japan	25,000	Carpet	(Chinese Taipei) Chuang Chia-jung	(Chinese Taipei) Chan Chin-wei (Chinese Taipei) Chan Yung-jan	6–7^{(5)}, 6–4, 6–7^{(3)}
Loss	4–7	Oct 2004	ITF Shenzhen, China	50,000	Hard	(Chinese Taipei) Chuang Chia-jung	(China) Yan Zi (China) Zheng Jie	3–6, 1–6
Loss	4–8	Nov 2004	ITF Mount Gambier, Australia	25,000	Hard	(Japan) Ryōko Fuda	(Chinese Taipei) Chan Chin-wei (Chinese Taipei) Chan Yung-jan	3–6, 7–5, 5–7
Win	5–8	Feb 2005	ITF Taipei, Taiwan	25,000	Hard	(Chinese Taipei) Chuang Chia-jung	(Japan) Ryōko Fuda (Japan) Seiko Okamoto	6–3, 6–2
Loss	5–9	May 2005	ITF Changwon, South Korea	25,000	Hard	(Chinese Taipei) Chan Chin-wei	(Chinese Taipei) Chuang Chia-jung (Japan) Seiko Okamoto	2–6, 5–7
Win	6–9	May 2005	ITF Gunma, Japan	25,000	Hard	(Chinese Taipei) Chan Chin-wei	(Japan) Ayami Takase (Japan) Mayumi Yamamoto	6–2, 1–1 ret.
Win	7–9	Jun 2005	ITF Seoul, South Korea	25,000	Hard	(Chinese Taipei) Chan Chin-wei	(Japan) Maki Arai (South Korea) Lee Eun-jeong	6–2, 6–1
Win	8–9	Jun 2005	ITF Incheon, South Korea	25,000	Hard	(Chinese Taipei) Chan Chin-wei	(South Korea) Choi Jin-young (South Korea) Lee Ye-ra	6–2, 7–6^{(4)}
Win	9–9	Jul 2005	ITF Kurume, Japan	25,000	Carpet	(Chinese Taipei) Chan Chin-wei	(Japan) Ayumi Morita (Japan) Erika Sema	6–4, 6–3
Win	10–9	Nov 2005	ITF Shenzhen, China	50,000	Hard	(China) Yan Zi	(Chinese Taipei) Chan Chin-wei (Chinese Taipei) Hsu Wen-hsin	6–0, 6–2
Win	11–9	Nov 2005	ITF Palm Beach, U.S.	50,000	Clay	(Chinese Taipei) Chan Chin-wei	(Czech Republic) Olga Vymetálková (Czech Republic) Kateřina Böhmová	7–6^{(2)}, 7–5
Win	12–9	May 2006	ITF Gifu, Japan	50,000	Carpet	(Chinese Taipei) Chan Chin-wei	(Chinese Taipei) Chan Yung-jan (Chinese Taipei) Chuang Chia-jung	7–6^{(5)}, 3–6, 7–5
Loss	12–10	Jun 2006	ITF Surbiton, UK	25,000	Grass	(Thailand) Tamarine Tanasugarn	(Australia) Casey Dellacqua (Australia) Trudi Musgrave	3–6, 3–6
Win	13–10	Oct 2006	ITF Makinohara, Japan	25,000	Carpet	(Japan) Kumiko Iijima	(Japan) Keiko Taguchi (Japan) Kim Hea-mi	6–3, 4–6, 6–0
Win	14–10	Oct 2006	ITF Hamanako, Japan	25,000	Carpet	(Chinese Taipei) Chuang Chia-jung	(Japan) Maki Arai (Japan) Seiko Okamoto	7–6^{(2)}, 7–5
Win	15–10	Nov 2006	ITF Shenzhen, China (2)	50,000	Hard	(Russia) Alla Kudryavtseva	(Uzbekistan) Akgul Amanmuradova (Uzbekistan) Iroda Tulyaganova	2–0 ret.
Loss	15–11	Nov 2006	ITF Kaohsiung, Taiwan	75,000	Hard	(Chinese Taipei) Chan Chin-wei	(Chinese Taipei) Chan Yung-jan (Chinese Taipei) Chuang Chia-jung	6–7^{(1)}, 1–6
Win	16–11	Mar 2007	ITF Orange, U.S.	25,000	Clay	(Argentina) Jorgelina Cravero	(Chinese Taipei) Chan Chin-wei (Ukraine) Tetiana Luzhanska	6–3, 6–1
Loss	16–12	Mar 2007	ITF Redding, U.S.	25,000	Hard	(Argentina) Jorgelina Cravero	(Chinese Taipei) Chan Chin-wei (United States) Julie Ditty	3–6, 2–6
Win	17–12	May 2007	ITF Gimcheon, South Korea	25,000	Hard	(Chinese Taipei) Chan Chin-wei	(Ukraine) Tetiana Luzhanska (Indonesia) Romana Tedjakusuma	7–5, 6–4
Loss	17–13	Oct 2007	ITF Taipei, Taiwan	50,000	Hard	(Chinese Taipei) Hsieh Shu-ying	(Chinese Taipei) Chan Hao-ching (Chinese Taipei) Chan Yung-jan	1–6, 6–2, [12–14]
Win	18–13	May 2008	ITF Saint-Gaudens, France	50,000	Clay	(Canada) Marie-Ève Pelletier	(France) Aurélie Védy (South Africa) Chanelle Scheepers	6–4, 6–0
Win	19–13	Oct 2008	ITF Taipei, Taiwan	100,000	Carpet (i)	(Chinese Taipei) Chuang Chia-jung	(Chinese Taipei) Hsu Wen-hsin (Chinese Taipei) Hwang I-hsuan	6–3, 6–3
Loss	19–14	Nov 2010	ITF Taipei, Taiwan	100,000	Carpet (i)	(India) Sania Mirza	(Chinese Taipei) Chang Kai-chen (Chinese Taipei) Chuang Chia-jung	4–6, 2–6
Win	20–14	Apr 2012	ITF Wenshan, China	50,000	Hard	(Chinese Taipei) Hsieh Shu-ying	(China) Liu Wanting (China) Xu Yifan	6–3, 6–2
Win	21–14	May 2016	ITF Marseille, France	100,000	Clay	(United States) Nicole Melichar	(Slovakia) Jana Čepelová (Spain) Lourdes Domínguez Lino	1–6, 6–3, [10–3]
Win	22–14	Oct 2016	ITF Porto, Portugal	10,000	Clay	(Chinese Taipei) Hsieh Shu-ying	(Portugal) Francisca Jorge (Portugal) Rita Vilaça	6–3, 6–4
Loss	22–15	Dec 2016	ITF Dubai, UAE	100,000+H	Hard	(Russia) Valeria Savinykh	(Luxembourg) Mandy Minella (Serbia) Nina Stojanović	3–6, 6–3, [4–10]
Win	23–15	May 2017	ITF Cagnes-sur-Mer, France	100,000	Clay	(Chinese Taipei) Chang Kai-chen	(Romania) Raluca Olaru (Czech Republic) Renata Voráčová	7–5, 6–1

== WTA Tour career earnings ==
Year	Tour Singles titles	Tour Doubles titles	Tour Mixed Doubles titles	Earnings ($)	Money list rank
2007	0	2	0	N/A*	N/A
2008	0	2	0	225,149	78
2009	0	3	0	385,433	53
2010	0	0	0	N/A*	N/A
2011	0	1	0	N/A*	N/A
2012	2	1	0	490,114	38
2013	0	5	0	1,109,280	22
2014	0	3	0	809,336	32
2015	0	0	0	348,606	90
2016	0	0	0	346,999	89
2017	0	2	0	433,264	84
2018	1	1	0	1,270,928	31
2019	0	4	0	2,066,334	17
2020	0	4	0	585,872	29
2021	0	2	0	1,410,910	20
2022	did not play				
2023	0	2	0	886,334	45
Career	3	30	0	10,983,445	62

* Hsieh won her first tour title in 2007, so relevant stats begin from there. Statistics for WTA Prize Money Leaders only includes the top 100 till 2013. By utilizing Career Prize Money information, prize money earned from 2001 to 2007, and from 2010 to 2011, is $604,427.

== Head-to-head records ==
=== Record against top 10 players ===
Hsieh's record against players who have been ranked in the top 10. Active players are in boldface.

Player	Record	Win %	**Hard**	**Clay**	**Grass**	**Carpet**	Last match
**Number 1 ranked players**							
(Belgium) Kim Clijsters	1–0	100%	1–0	–	–	–	Won (6–3, 5–7, 6–3) at 2021 Chicago
(Spain) Garbiñe Muguruza	2–0	100%	2–0	–	–	–	Won (3–6, 7–6^{(7–1)}, 6–1) at 2019 Osaka
**(United States) Venus Williams**	1–0	100%	1–0	–	–	–	Won (6–2, 6–3) at 2021 Chicago
**(Romania) Simona Halep**	1–2	33%	0–1	–	1–1	–	Lost (2–6, 0–6) at 2019 Eastbourne
(Germany) Angelique Kerber	1–2	33%	1–1	0–1	–	–	Won (5–7, 6–4, 6–0) at 2019 Dubai
**(Czech Republic) Karolína Plíšková**	1–2	33%	1–1	–	0–1	–	Lost (3–6, 6–2, 4–6) at 2019 Wimbledon
**(Denmark) Caroline Wozniacki**	2–4	33%	2–3	0–1	–	–	Won (6–7^{(2–7)}, 6–1, 6–2) at 2019 Wuhan
**(Japan) Naomi Osaka**	1–5	17%	1–3	0–1	0–1	–	Lost (2–6, 2–6) at 2021 Australian Open
**(Belarus) Victoria Azarenka**	0–1	0%	0–1	–	–	–	Lost (3–6, 4–6) at 2007 Tashkent
(Australia) Ashleigh Barty	0–1	0%	–	–	0–1	–	Lost (0–6, 4–6) at 2018 Eastbourne
(Belgium) Justine Henin	0–1	0%	0–1	–	–	–	Lost (2–6, 2–6) at 2008 Australian Open
(Serbia) Ana Ivanovic	0–1	0%	0–1	–	–	–	Lost (1–6, 2–6) at 2013 Toronto
(Serbia) Jelena Janković	0–1	0%	0–1	–	–	–	Lost (4–6, 4–6) at 2008 Hopman Cup
(Russia) Dinara Safina	0–2	0%	0–1	–	0–1	–	Lost (6–4, 2–6, 5–7) at 2009 Hopman Cup
(Russia) Maria Sharapova	0–2	0%	–	0–1	0–1	–	Lost (2–6, 1–6) at 2013 French Open
(United States) Serena Williams	0–1	0%	0–1	–	–	–	Lost (1–6, 2–6) at 2016 Australian Open
Number 2 ranked players							
**(Belarus) Aryna Sabalenka**	2–1	67%	0–1	1–0	1–0	–	Lost (7–5, 1–6, 5–7) at 2020 Adelaide
(Poland) Agnieszka Radwańska	1–1	50%	1–1	–	–	–	Won (6–2, 7–5) at 2018 Australian Open
**(Russia) Svetlana Kuznetsova**	0–3	0%	0–3	–	–	–	Lost (2–6, 6–7^{(5–7)}) at 2019 Wuhan
**(Czech Republic) Petra Kvitová**	0–4	0%	0–3	0–1	–	–	Lost (6–3, 2–6, 4–6) at 2019 Dubai
**(Russia) Vera Zvonareva**	0–2	0%	0–2	–	–	–	Lost (4–6, 4–6) at 2020 Doha
Number 3 ranked players							
**(Czech Republic) Barbora Krejčíková**	1–0	100%	1–0	–	–	–	Won (7–5, 6–1) at 2018 Indian Wells Qualifying
(Russia) Nadia Petrova	0–2	0%	0–2	–	–	–	Lost (6–3, 2–6, 4–6) at 2013 Doha
**(United States) Sloane Stephens**	0–1	0%	–	0–1	–	–	Lost (2–6, 4–6) at 2012 Rome Qualifying
Number 4 ranked players							
(Japan) Kimiko Date-Krumm	1–0	100%	1–0	–	–	–	Won (7–5, 6–0) at 2012 Pattaya City
**(Canada) Bianca Andreescu**	1–1	50%	1–1	–	–	–	Won (6–3, 6–2) at 2021 Australian Open
(United Kingdom) Johanna Konta	2–5	29%	0–2	1–2	1–1	–	Lost (7–6^{(7–1)}, 4–6, 4–6) at 2019 Rabat
**(Switzerland) Belinda Bencic**	0–3	0%	0–3	–	–	–	Lost (5–7, 2–6) at 2019 Beijing
(Slovakia) Dominika Cibulková	0–4	0%	0–3	–	0–1	–	Lost (6–7^{(3–7)}, 6–4, 4–6) at 2018 US Open
**(France) Caroline Garcia**	0–5	0%	0–2	0–2	0–1	–	Lost (5–7, 2–6) at 2019 Madrid
**(United States) Sofia Kenin**	0–2	0%	0–2	–	–	–	Lost (4–6, 3–6) at 2019 Toronto
(Australia) Samantha Stosur	0–3	0%	0–1	0–2	–	–	Lost (3–6, 6–7^{(3–7)}) at 2016 Strasbourg
**(Poland) Iga Świątek**	0–2	0%	–	0–1	0–1	–	Lost (4–6, 4–6) at 2021 Wimbledon
Number 5 ranked players							
**(Latvia) Jeļena Ostapenko**	2–1	67%	1–1	–	1–0	–	Lost (3–6, 0–6) at 2021 Indian Wells
(Slovakia) Daniela Hantuchová	1–1	50%	1–1	–	–	–	Won (6–1, 0–6, 6–4) at 2012 Tournament of Champions
**(Italy) Sara Errani**	1–3	25%	1–1	0–2	–	–	Won (6–4, 2–6, 7–5) at 2021 Australian Open
(Czech Republic) Lucie Šafářová	1–4	20%	0–1	1–1	0–2	–	Won (6–2, 6–3) at 2018 Strasbourg
Number 6 ranked players							
(Italy) Flavia Pennetta	1–4	20%	1–2	0–1	0–1	–	Lost (3–6, 3–6) at 2014 Eastbourne
(Spain) Carla Suárez Navarro	0–2	0%	0–2	–	–	–	Lost (4–6, 6–2, 3–6) at 2018 Indian Wells
**(Greece) Maria Sakkari**	0–2	0%	0–1	0–1	–	–	Lost (5–7, 5–7) at 2018 Dubai
Number 7 ranked players							
**(Tunisia) Ons Jabeur**	0–1	0%	0–1	–	–	–	Lost (1–6, 0–6) at 2021 Chicago
(Estonia) Anett Kontaveit	0–3	0%	0–3	–	–	–	Lost (4–6, 1–6) at 2020 Brisbane
(Austria) Barbara Schett	0–1	0%	0–1	–	–	–	Lost (1–6, 1–6) at 2002 Waikoloa
(Italy) Roberta Vinci	0–2	0%	0–2	–	–	–	Lost (1–6, 2–6) at 2012 Tournament of Champions
Number 8 ranked players							
(Russia) Ekaterina Makarova	0–1	0%	–	–	0–1	–	Lost (6–3, 3–6, 3–6) at 2012 Birmingham
Number 9 ranked players							
(Germany) Julia Görges	0–2	0%	0–1	0–1	–	–	Lost (3–6, 4–6) at 2019 Rome
(Germany) Andrea Petkovic	0–1	0%	–	0–1	–	–	Lost (6–4, 3–6, 6–8) at 2019 French Open
(United States) CoCo Vandeweghe	0–1	0%	–	–	0–1	–	Lost (6–2, 5–7, 4–6) at 2012 Nottingham
Number 10 ranked players							
**(United States) Danielle Collins**	2–0	100%	2–0	–	–	–	Won (7–6^{(7–4)}, 6–3) at 2019 Sydney
**(France) Kristina Mladenovic**	1–1	50%	0–1	–	–	1–0	Lost (6–2, 0–6, 2–6) at 2015 Sydney
**(Russia) Daria Kasatkina**	0–1	0%	0–1	–	–	–	Lost (4–6, 3–6) at 2021 Parma
(Russia) Maria Kirilenko	0–1	0%	0–1	–	–	–	Lost (2–6, 5–7) at 2008 Cincinnati
**Total**	**27–96**	**22%**	**19–62 (23%)**	**3–20 (13%)**	**4–14 (22%)**	**1–0 (100%)**	**last updated 4 February 2022**

=== No. 1 wins ===
#	Player	Event	Surface	Round	Score	Result
1.	(Romania) Simona Halep	2018 Wimbledon, UK	Grass	3R	3–6, 6–4, 7–5	4R
2.	(Japan) Naomi Osaka	2019 Miami Open, U.S.	Hard	3R	4–6, 7–6^{(7–4)}, 6–3	QF

=== Top 10 wins ===
#	Player	Rank	Event	Surface	Rd	Score
**2017**
1.	(United Kingdom) Johanna Konta	No. 8	French Open	Clay	1R	1–6, 7–6^{(7–2)}, 6–4
**2018**
2.	(Spain) Garbiñe Muguruza	No. 3	Australian Open	Hard	2R	7–6^{(7–1)}, 6–4
3.	(Romania) Simona Halep	No. 1	Wimbledon, UK	Grass	3R	3–6, 6–4, 7–5
**2019**
4.	(Germany) Angelique Kerber	No. 7	Dubai Championships, UAE	Hard	3R	5–7, 6–4, 6–0
5.	(Czech Republic) Karolína Plíšková	No. 5	Dubai Championships, UAE	Hard	QF	6–4, 1–6, 7–5
6.	(Japan) Naomi Osaka	No. 1	Miami Open, United States	Hard	3R	4–6, 7–6^{(7–4)}, 6–3
7.	(Belarus) Aryna Sabalenka	No. 10	Birmingham Classic, UK	Grass	1R	6–3, 2–6, 7–6^{(7–1)}
**2021**
8.	(Canada) Bianca Andreescu	No. 9	Australian Open	Hard	2R	6–3, 6–2
