= 2013 ITF Women's Circuit – Wenshan – Doubles =

Wenshan – Doubles
- 2013 ITF Women's Circuit – Wenshan

Final
- Champions: (Japan) Miki Miyamura (Thailand) Varatchaya Wongteanchai
- Runners-up: (Japan) Rika Fujiwara (Japan) Junri Namigata
- Score: 7–5, 6–3

Events
Singles	Doubles
← 2012 ·	ITF Women's Circuit – Wenshan	· 2014 →

Hsieh Shu-ying and Hsieh Su-wei were the defending champions, having won the event in 2012, but Hsieh Su-wei chose not to participate. Hsieh Shu-ying paired up with Zhu Aiwen but lost in the first round to Li Ting and Zhang Kailin.

Miki Miyamura and Varatchaya Wongteanchai won the title, defeating Rika Fujiwara and Junri Namigata in the final, 7–5, 6–3.

== Seeds ==
1. (China) Xu Yifan / (China) Zheng Saisai (quarterfinals)
2. (Japan) Miki Miyamura / (Thailand) Varatchaya Wongteanchai (champions)
3. (China) Liang Chen / (China) Sun Shengnan (first round)
4. (United Kingdom) Samantha Murray / (United Kingdom) Emily Webley-Smith (semifinals)

== Draw ==
=== Key ===
- Q = Qualifier
- WC = Wild card
- LL = Lucky loser
- Alt = Alternate
- SE = Special exempt
- PR = Protected ranking
- ITF = ITF entry
- JE = Junior exempt
- w/o = Walkover
- r = Retired
- d = Defaulted
- SR = Special ranking

First round
1	(China) Y Xu (China) S Zheng	4	6	[10]
(Chinese Taipei) C-w Chan (China) C Liu	6	1	[4]
(Japan) R Fujiwara (Japan) J Namigata	6	6
(China) Jiaj Lu (China) Jiax Lu	4	2
3	(China) C Liang (China) S Sun	7^{9}	3	[7]
(China) X Wen (China) Y Zhao	6^{7}	6	[10]
WC	(China) X Han (China) Q Ye	6	6
(South Korea) S-j Jang (Japan) Y Sema	3	0
WC	(China) T Li (China) K Zhang	6	6
(Chinese Taipei) S-y Hsieh (China) A Zhu	4	2
(South Korea) S-h Han (South Korea) S-r Lee	6^{6}	4
4	(United Kingdom) S Murray (United Kingdom) E Webley-Smith	7^{8}	6
(China) H Tang (China) R Tian	6	6
WC	(China) Mengj Yi (China) Mengy Yi	4	2
(China) W Liu (China) Z Yang	3	6^{6}
2	(Japan) M Miyamura (Thailand) V Wongteanchai	6	7^{8}

Quarterfinals
1	(China) Y Xu (China) S Zheng	4	6	[8]
(Japan) R Fujiwara (Japan) J Namigata	6	1	[10]
(China) X Wen (China) Y Zhao	1	0
WC	(China) X Han (China) Q Ye	6	6
WC	(China) T Li (China) K Zhang	1	3
4	(United Kingdom) S Murray (United Kingdom) E Webley-Smith	6	6
(China) H Tang (China) R Tian	6^{5}	4
2	(Japan) M Miyamura (Thailand) V Wongteanchai	7	6

Semifinals
(Japan) R Fujiwara (Japan) J Namigata	2	6	[10]
WC	(China) X Han (China) Q Ye	6	4	[8]
4	(United Kingdom) S Murray (United Kingdom) E Webley-Smith	3	5
2	(Japan) M Miyamura (Thailand) V Wongteanchai	6	7

Final
(Japan) R Fujiwara (Japan) J Namigata	5	3
2	(Japan) M Miyamura (Thailand) V Wongteanchai	7	6
