= 2013 ITF Women's Circuit – Wenshan – Singles =

Wenshan – Singles
- 2013 ITF Women's Circuit – Wenshan

Final
- Champion: (China) Zhang Yuxuan
- Runner-up: (China) Wang Qiang
- Score: 1–6, 7–6^{(7–4)}, 6–2

Events
Singles	Doubles
← 2012 ·	ITF Women's Circuit – Wenshan	· 2014 →

Hsieh Su-wei was the defending champion, having won the event in 2012, but decided not to participate in 2013.

Zhang Yuxuan won the tournament, defeating Wang Qiang in the final, 1–6, 7–6^{(7–4)}, 6–2.

== Seeds ==
1. (China) Duan Yingying (semifinals)
2. (China) Zheng Saisai (semifinals)
3. (China) Wang Qiang (final)
4. (Japan) Yurika Sema (second round)
5. (Kazakhstan) Zarina Diyas (quarterfinals)
6. (Thailand) Varatchaya Wongteanchai (quarterfinals)
7. (Japan) Junri Namigata (second round)
8. (Chinese Taipei) Chan Chin-wei (second round)

== Main draw ==
=== Key ===
- Q = Qualifier
- WC = Wild card
- LL = Lucky loser
- Alt = Alternate
- SE = Special exempt
- PR = Protected ranking
- ITF = ITF entry
- JE = Junior exempt
- w/o = Walkover
- r = Retired
- d = Defaulted
- SR = Special ranking

=== Finals ===
Semifinals
1	(China) Duan Yingying	6^{3}	6	4
3	(China) Wang Qiang	7^{7}	4	6
(China) Zhang Yuxuan	7	6
2	(China) Zheng Saisai	5	4

Final
3	(China) Wang Qiang	6	6^{4}	2
(China) Zhang Yuxuan	1	7^{7}	6

=== Top half ===
First round
1	(China) Y Duan	6	6
(China) Y Hu	2	4
(South Korea) S-r Lee	3	2
Q	(China) F Liu	6	6
WC	(China) K Zhang	7	6
(China) H Tang	5	2
WC	(China) M Yi	2	1
7	(Japan) J Namigata	6	6
3	(China) Q Wang	6	6
WC	(China) Z Yang	3	3
(China) X Wen	6	7
(Japan) R Fujiwara	4	5
(China) S Sun	7	6
(Chinese Taipei) W-h Hsu	5	1
(South Korea) S-h Han	4	7^{9}	2
8	(Chinese Taipei) C-w Chan	6	6^{7}	6

Second round
1	(China) Y Duan	6	6
Q	(China) F Liu	1	1
WC	(China) K Zhang	6	1	6
7	(Japan) J Namigata	4	6	2
3	(China) Q Wang	6	6
(China) X Wen	2	0
(China) S Sun	6	6
8	(Chinese Taipei) C-w Chan	1	0

Quarterfinals
1	(China) Y Duan	6	6
WC	(China) K Zhang	3	3
3	(China) Q Wang	6	5	6
(China) S Sun	2	7	2

Semifinals
1	(China) Y Duan	6^{3}	6	4
3	(China) Q Wang	7^{7}	4	6

=== Bottom half ===
First round
5	(Kazakhstan) Z Diyas	6	6
(China) X Han	0	4
Q	(Japan) M Miyamura	2	0
(China) Y Xu	6	6
(China) Y Zhang	6	6
Q	(China) D Zhao	3	1
(China) J Lu	6	5	3
4	(Japan) Y Sema	3	7	6
6	(Thailand) V Wongteanchai	7^{7}	6
Q	(South Korea) S-j Jang	6^{1}	0
(China) C Liang	1	2
(China) C Liu	6	6
WC	(China) R Tian	1	6	6
(United Kingdom) S Murray	6	2	3
(Japan) A Yamasoto	0	0
2	(China) S Zheng	6	6

Second round
5	(Kazakhstan) Z Diyas	7	6
(China) Y Xu	6^{4}	2
(China) Y Zhang	7	6
4	(Japan) Y Sema	5	3
6	(Thailand) V Wongteanchai	6^{4}	6	6
(China) C Liu	7^{7}	4	1
WC	(China) R Tian	3	3
2	(China) S Zheng	6	6

Quarterfinals
5	(Kazakhstan) Z Diyas	3	6	2
(China) Y Zhang	6	4	6
6	(Thailand) V Wongteanchai	1	4
2	(China) S Zheng	6	6

Semifinals
(China) Y Zhang	7	6
2	(China) S Zheng	5	4
