= 2012 ITF Women's Circuit – Wenshan – Doubles =

Wenshan – Doubles
- 2012 ITF Women's Circuit – Wenshan

Final
- Champions: (Chinese Taipei) Hsieh Shu-ying (Chinese Taipei) Hsieh Su-wei
- Runners-up: (China) Liu Wanting (China) Xu Yifan
- Score: 6–3, 6–2

Events
Singles	Doubles
← 2011 ·	ITF Women's Circuit – Wenshan	· 2013 →

Shuko Aoyama and Rika Fujiwara were the defending champions, but Fujiwara chose not to participate. Aoyama partnered up with Mari Tanaka, but lost in the quarterfinals to Han Xinyun and Sun Shengnan.

Hsieh Shu-ying and Hsieh Su-wei won the title, defeating Liu Wanting and Xu Yifan in the final, 6–3, 6–2.

== Seeds ==
1. (Thailand) Noppawan Lertcheewakarn / (China) Zheng Saisai (first round)
2. (China) Han Xinyun / (China) Sun Shengnan (semifinals)
3. (China) Liu Wanting / (China) Xu Yifan (final)
4. (Chinese Taipei) Hsieh Shu-ying / (Chinese Taipei) Hsieh Su-wei (champions)

== Draw ==
=== Key ===
- Q = Qualifier
- WC = Wild card
- LL = Lucky loser
- Alt = Alternate
- SE = Special exempt
- PR = Protected ranking
- ITF = ITF entry
- JE = Junior exempt
- w/o = Walkover
- r = Retired
- d = Defaulted
- SR = Special ranking

=== Draw ===
First round
1	(Thailand) N Lertcheewakarn (China) S Zheng	4	3
(Ukraine) T Arefyeva (Bulgaria) A Naydenova	6	6
Q	(Thailand) N Lertpitaksinchai (Thailand) P Plipuech	6	6
WC	(China) J Chen (China) J Huang	1	4
4	(Chinese Taipei) S-y Hsieh (Chinese Taipei) S-w Hsieh	7	6
(Thailand) Vara Wongteanchai (Thailand) Varu Wongteanchai	5	0
(Indonesia) AF Damayanti (Belgium) T Hendler	7	4	[8]
Q	(Japan) M Eguchi (Japan) E Takao	5	6	[10]
(South Korea) S-h Han (Chinese Taipei) S-y Kao	2	7^{9}	[4]
(Chinese Taipei) C-w Chan (Japan) J Namigata	6	6^{7}	[10]
(China) C Liang (China) Y Zhao	2	2
3	(China) W Liu (China) Y Xu	6	6
WC	(China) M Yi (China) Y Yuan	0	2
(Japan) S Aoyama (Japan) M Tanaka	6	6
WC	(China) HC Tang (China) R Tian	5	4
2	(China) X Han (China) S Sun	7	6

Quarterfinals
(Ukraine) T Arefyeva (Bulgaria) A Naydenova	3	3
Q	(Thailand) N Lertpitaksinchai (Thailand) P Plipuech	6	6
4	(Chinese Taipei) S-y Hsieh (Chinese Taipei) S-w Hsieh	6	7
Q	(Japan) M Eguchi (Japan) E Takao	0	5
(Chinese Taipei) C-w Chan (Japan) J Namigata	6	3	[7]
3	(China) W Liu (China) Y Xu	3	6	[10]
(Japan) S Aoyama (Japan) M Tanaka	4	2
2	(China) X Han (China) S Sun	6	6

Semifinals
Q	(Thailand) N Lertpitaksinchai (Thailand) P Plipuech	6^{3}	3
4	(Chinese Taipei) S-y Hsieh (Chinese Taipei) S-w Hsieh	7^{7}	6
3	(China) W Liu (China) Y Xu	2	6	[10]
2	(China) X Han (China) S Sun	4	[4]

Finals
4	(Chinese Taipei) S-y Hsieh (Chinese Taipei) S-w Hsieh	6	6
3	(China) W Liu (China) Y Xu	3	2
