= 2018 Dubai Tennis Championships – Men's doubles =

Men's doubles
- 2018 Dubai Tennis Championships

Final
- Champions: (Netherlands) Jean-Julien Rojer; (Romania) Horia Tecău
- Runners-up: (United States) James Cerretani; (India) Leander Paes
- Score: 6–2, 7–6^{(7–2)}

Details
- Draw: 16
- Seeds: 4

Events
Singles	men	women
Doubles	men	women
← 2017 ·	Dubai Tennis Championships	· 2019 →

Jean-Julien Rojer and Horia Tecău were the defending champions, and successfully defended their title, defeating James Cerretani and Leander Paes in the final, 6–2, 7–6^{(7–2)}.

== Seeds ==
1. (Finland) Henri Kontinen / (Australia) John Peers (first round)
2. (Netherlands) Jean-Julien Rojer / (Romania) Horia Tecău (champions)
3. (Croatia) Ivan Dodig / (United States) Rajeev Ram (semifinals)
4. (South Africa) Raven Klaasen / (New Zealand) Michael Venus (quarterfinals)

== Draw ==
=== Key ===
- Q = Qualifier
- WC = Wild card
- LL = Lucky loser
- Alt = Alternate
- SE = Special exempt
- PR = Protected ranking
- ITF = ITF entry
- JE = Junior exempt
- w/o = Walkover
- r = Retired
- d = Defaulted
- SR = Special ranking

=== Draw ===
First round

Quarterfinals

Semifinals

Final

1
- (Finland) H Kontinen
- (Australia) J Peers
6^{4}
6^{2}

(Bosnia and Herzegovina) D Džumhur
(Serbia) F Krajinović
7^{7}
7^{7}

(Bosnia and Herzegovina) D Džumhur
(Serbia) F Krajinović
w/o

WC
- (Uzbekistan) D Istomin
- (Canada) D Nestor
1
6^{3}

- (France) R Gasquet
- (France) P-H Herbert

(France) R Gasquet
(France) P-H Herbert
6
7^{7}

- (Bosnia and Herzegovina) D Džumhur
- (Serbia) F Krajinović
4
2

4
(South Africa) R Klaasen
(New Zealand) M Venus
6
3
[10]

WC
(United States) J Cerretani
(India) L Paes
6
6

- (India) R Bopanna
- (France) É Roger-Vasselin
4
6
[6]

4
- (South Africa) R Klaasen
- (New Zealand) M Venus
6
4
[7]

LL
- (Austria) A Haider-Maurer
- (Germany) F Mayer
3
1

WC
(United States) J Cerretani
(India) L Paes
2
6
[10]

WC
(United States) J Cerretani
(India) L Paes
6
6

WC
- (United States) J Cerretani
- (India) L Paes
2
6^{2}

Q
- (Germany) J-L Struff
- (Serbia) V Troicki
4
4

2
(Netherlands) J-J Rojer
(Romania) H Tecău
6
7^{7}

(Netherlands) R Haase
(Netherlands) M Middelkoop
6
6

- (Netherlands) R Haase
- (Netherlands) M Middelkoop
3
6^{6}

- (Spain) M Granollers
- (Serbia) N Zimonjić
7^{7}
2
[6]

3
(Croatia) I Dodig
(United States) R Ram
6
7^{8}

3
(Croatia) I Dodig
(United States) R Ram
6^{4}
6
[10]

3
- (Croatia) I Dodig
- (United States) R Ram
5
3

- (India) D Sharan
- (Japan) Y Sugita
5
1

2
(Netherlands) J-J Rojer
(Romania) H Tecău
7
6

(Poland) M Matkowski
(Pakistan) A-u-H Qureshi
7
6

- (Poland) M Matkowski
- (Pakistan) A-u-H Qureshi
4
4

- (New Zealand) M Daniell
- (United Kingdom) D Inglot
3
7^{10}
[7]

2
(Netherlands) J-J Rojer
(Romania) H Tecău
6
6

2
(Netherlands) J-J Rojer
(Romania) H Tecău
6
6^{8}
[10]

== Qualifying ==
=== Seeds ===
1. (Germany) Jan-Lennard Struff / (Serbia) Viktor Troicki (qualified)
2. (Austria) Andreas Haider-Maurer / (Germany) Florian Mayer (qualifying competition, lucky losers)

=== Qualifiers ===
1. (Germany) Jan-Lennard Struff / (Serbia) Viktor Troicki

=== Lucky losers ===
1. (Austria) Andreas Haider-Maurer / (Germany) Florian Mayer

=== Qualifying draw ===
First round

Qualifying competition

1
(Germany) Jan-Lennard Struff
(Serbia) Viktor Troicki
6
6

WC
(United Arab Emirates) Fares Al Janahi
(United Arab Emirates) Fahad Janahi
1
0

1
(Germany) Jan-Lennard Struff
(Serbia) Viktor Troicki
6
6

2
- (Austria) Andreas Haider-Maurer
- (Germany) Florian Mayer
3
4

- (Kazakhstan) Mikhail Kukushkin
- (Portugal) João Sousa
5
7
[10]

2
(Austria) Andreas Haider-Maurer
(Germany) Florian Mayer
7
5
[12]
