= 2012 ITF Women's Circuit – Wenshan =

- Date: 9–15 April
- Edition: 2nd
- Surface: Hard
- Location: Wenshan City, China

Champions

Singles
- (Chinese Taipei) Hsieh Su-wei

Doubles
- (Chinese Taipei) Hsieh Shu-ying / (Chinese Taipei) Hsieh Su-wei
← 2011 ·	ITF Women's Circuit – Wenshan	· 2013 →

The 2012 ITF Women's Circuit – Wenshan is a professional tennis tournament played on hard courts. It is the 2nd edition of the tournament which is part of the 2012 ITF Women's Circuit. It takes place in Wenshan City, China between 9 and 15 April 2012.

== WTA entrants ==
=== Seeds ===
Country	Player	Rank^{1}	Seed
TPE	Hsieh Su-wei	74	1
CHN	Zhang Shuai	86	2
THA	Noppawan Lertcheewakarn	184	3
BEL	Tamaryn Hendler	208	4
JPN	Misa Eguchi	214	5
THA	Varatchaya Wongteanchai	215	6
CHN	Wang Qiang	222	7
INA	Ayu Fani Damayanti	231	8

- ^{1} Rankings are as of April 2, 2012.

=== Other entrants ===
The following players received wildcards into the singles main draw:

- (China) Ran Tian
- (China) Sun Shengnan
- (China) Zhang Shuai

The following players received entry from the qualifying draw:

- (Chinese Taipei) Chan Chin-wei
- (China) Han Xinyun
- (China) Liu Fanzhou
- (China) Zhang Yuxuan

The following players received entry from a lucky loser spot:

- (Japan) Mari Tanaka
- (China) Zhang Kailin

== Champions ==
=== Singles ===
- (Chinese Taipei) Hsieh Su-wei def. (China) Zheng Saisai, 6–3, 6–3

=== Doubles ===
- (Chinese Taipei) Hsieh Shu-ying / (Chinese Taipei) Hsieh Su-wei def. (China) Liu Wanting / (China) Xu Yifan, 6–3, 6–2
