= 2012 ITF Women's Circuit – Wenshan – Singles =

Wenshan – Singles
- 2012 ITF Women's Circuit – Wenshan

Final
- Champion: (Chinese Taipei) Hsieh Su-wei
- Runner-up: (China) Zheng Saisai
- Score: 6–3, 6–3

Events
Singles	Doubles
← 2011 ·	ITF Women's Circuit – Wenshan	· 2013 →

Iryna Brémond was the defending champion, but chose not to participate.

Hsieh Su-wei won the title, defeating Zheng Saisai in the final, 6–3, 6–3.

== Seeds ==
1. (Chinese Taipei) Hsieh Su-wei (champion)
2. (China) Zhang Shuai (first round)
3. (Thailand) Noppawan Lertcheewakarn (first round)
4. (Belgium) Tamaryn Hendler (quarterfinals)
5. (Japan) Misa Eguchi (second round)
6. (Thailand) Varatchaya Wongteanchai (first round)
7. (China) Wang Qiang (first round)
8. (Indonesia) Ayu Fani Damayanti (quarterfinals)

== Main draw ==
=== Key ===
- Q = Qualifier
- WC = Wild card
- LL = Lucky loser
- Alt = Alternate
- SE = Special exempt
- PR = Protected ranking
- ITF = ITF entry
- JE = Junior exempt
- w/o = Walkover
- r = Retired
- d = Defaulted
- SR = Special ranking

=== Finals ===
Semifinals
1	(Chinese Taipei) Hsieh Su-wei	6	6
(Japan) Junri Namigata	2	0
(China) Xu Yifan	0	3
(China) Zheng Saisai	6	6

Final
1	(Chinese Taipei) Hsieh Su-wei	6	6
(China) Zheng Saisai	3	3

=== Top half ===
First round
1	(Chinese Taipei) S-w Hsieh	7	6
(Thailand) N Luangnam	5	3
Q	(China) X Han	6	2	6
(Japan) S Aoyama	4	6	3
(China) Y Duan	7^{7}	4	6^{4}
Q	(China) Y Zhang	6^{5}	6	7^{7}
(Chile) A Koch Benvenuto	6^{5}	3
8	(Indonesia) AF Damayanti	7^{7}	6
4	(Belgium) T Hendler	6	6
(South Korea) S-h Han	3	3
(China) Y Hu	6	6
(Hong Kong) L Zhang	4	2
(Japan) J Namigata	6	3	7^{9}
Q	(Chinese Taipei) C-w Chan	3	6	6^{7}
(China) Y Zhao	7	6
7	(China) Q Wang	5	3

Second round
1	(Chinese Taipei) S-w Hsieh	6	6
Q	(China) X Han	3	1
Q	(China) Y Zhang	4	3
8	(Indonesia) AF Damayanti	6	6
4	(Belgium) T Hendler	6	6
(China) Y Hu	1	3
(Japan) J Namigata	6	6
(China) Y Zhao	4	3

Quarterfinals
1	(Chinese Taipei) S-w Hsieh	6	6
8	(Indonesia) AF Damayanti	0	0
4	(Belgium) T Hendler	6	4	3
(Japan) J Namigata	3	6	6

Semifinals
1	(Chinese Taipei) S-w Hsieh	6	6
(Japan) J Namigata	2	0

=== Bottom half ===
First round
6	(Thailand) V Wongteanchai	4	1
(China) Y Xu	6	6
LL	(Japan) M Tanaka	1	0
WC	(China) S Sun	6	6
Q	(China) F Liu	6	7
(Ukraine) T Arefyeva	1	5
LL	(China) K Zhang	6	6
3	(Thailand) N Lertcheewakarn	3	2
5	(Japan) M Eguchi	7^{7}	6
(Japan) E Takao	6^{2}	2
(Thailand) N Lertpitaksinchai	1	1
(China) S Zheng	6	6
WC	(China) R Tian	2	4
(Thailand) L Kumkhum	6	6
(Bulgaria) A Naydenova	6	6
2	(China) S Zhang	3	3

Second round
(China) Y Xu	6	2	6
WC	(China) S Sun	3	6	3
Q	(China) F Liu	6	6
LL	(China) K Zhang	3	4
5	(Japan) M Eguchi	3	2
(China) S Zheng	6	6
(Thailand) L Kumkhum	4	1
(Bulgaria) A Naydenova	6	6

Quarterfinals
(China) Y Xu	7^{9}	6
Q	(China) F Liu	6^{7}	3
(China) S Zheng	7^{7}	6
(Bulgaria) A Naydenova	6^{2}	1

Semifinals
(China) Y Xu	0	3
(China) S Zheng	6	6
