= 2018 Dubai Tennis Championships – Men's singles =

Men's singles
- 2018 Dubai Tennis Championships

Final
- Champion: (Spain) Roberto Bautista Agut
- Runner-up: (France) Lucas Pouille
- Score: 6–3, 6–4

Details
- Draw: 32 (4 Q / 3 WC )
- Seeds: 8

Events
| Singles | men | women |
| Doubles | men | women |
- Dubai Tennis Championships

Andy Murray was the defending champion, but could not participate this year as he was recovering from hip surgery.

Roberto Bautista Agut won the title, defeating Lucas Pouille in the final, 6–3, 6–4.

== Seeds ==
1. (Bulgaria) Grigor Dimitrov (first round)
2. (France) Lucas Pouille (final)
3. (Spain) Roberto Bautista Agut (champion)
4. (Bosnia and Herzegovina) Damir Džumhur (second round)
5. (France) Richard Gasquet (first round)
6. (Germany) Philipp Kohlschreiber (second round)
7. (Serbia) Filip Krajinović (semifinals)
8. (Japan) Yūichi Sugita (quarterfinals)

== Draw ==
Key

- Q = Qualifier
- WC = Wild card
- LL = Lucky loser
- Alt = Alternate
- ITF = ITF entry
- PR = Protected ranking
- SR = Special ranking
- SE = Special exempt
- JE = Junior exempt
- JR = Junior Accelerator Programme entrant
- CO = College Accelerator Programme entrant
- NG = Next Gen Accelerator Program entrant
- w/o = Walkover
- r = Retired
- d = Defaulted

=== Finals ===
Semifinals
WC | (Tunisia) Malek Jaziri | 3 | 4
3 | (Spain) Roberto Bautista Agut | 6 | 6
7 | (Serbia) Filip Krajinović | 3 | 7^{7} | 6^{5}
2 | (France) Lucas Pouille | 6 | 6^{4} | 7^{7}

Final
3 | (Spain) Roberto Bautista Agut | 6 | 6
2 | (France) Lucas Pouille | 3 | 4

=== Top half ===
First round
1 | (Bulgaria) G Dimitrov | 6 | 5 | 4
WC | (Tunisia) M Jaziri | 4 | 7 | 6
(Netherlands) R Haase | 7 | 2 | 6
Q | (France) Q Halys | 5 | 6 | 4
WC | (Greece) S Tsitsipas | 6 | 6^{5} | 6
(Kazakhstan) M Kukushkin | 2 | 7^{7} | 3
Q | (France) G Sakharov | 4 | 2
6 | (Germany) P Kohlschreiber | 6 | 6
3 | (Spain) R Bautista Agut | 6 | 6
(Germany) F Mayer | 3 | 4
(Portugal) J Sousa | 6 | 4 | 6^{8}
(France) P-H Herbert | 4 | 6 | 7^{10}
PR | (Japan) Y Nishioka | 7 | 4 | 1
(France) B Paire | 5 | 6 | 6
(Croatia) B Ćorić | 6 | 6
5 | (France) R Gasquet | 4 | 3

Second round
WC | (Tunisia) M Jaziri | 7^{7} | 7^{7}
(Netherlands) R Haase | 6^{4} | 6^{3}
WC | (Greece) S Tsitsipas | 4 | 6 | 6
6 | (Germany) P Kohlschreiber | 6 | 3 | 4
3 | (Spain) R Bautista Agut | 6 | 6^{2} | 6
(France) P-H Herbert | 4 | 7^{7} | 1
(France) B Paire | 1 | 4
(Croatia) B Ćorić | 6 | 6

Quarterfinals
WC | (Tunisia) M Jaziri | 6 | 3 | 6
WC | (Greece) S Tsitsipas | 4 | 6 | 3
3 | (Spain) R Bautista Agut | 7^{7} | 6
(Croatia) B Ćorić | 6^{4} | 4

Semifinals
WC | (Tunisia) M Jaziri | 3 | 4
3 | (Spain) R Bautista Agut | 6 | 6

=== Bottom half ===
First round
7 | (Serbia) F Krajinović | 0 | 6 | 6
(Italy) T Fabbiano | 6 | 2 | 2
WC | (Cyprus) M Baghdatis | 7 | 6
(Serbia) V Troicki | 5 | 2
(Russia) E Donskoy | 6 | 6
LL | (Slovenia) B Kavčič | 3 | 4
Q | (Germany) Y Maden | 3 | 4
4 | (Bosnia and Herzegovina) D Džumhur | 6 | 6
8 | (Japan) Y Sugita | 7 | 6
SE | (Belarus) I Ivashka | 5 | 1
PR | (Austria) A Haider-Maurer | 2 | 4
(Germany) J-L Struff | 6 | 6
(Russia) K Khachanov | 7^{7} | 7^{7}
(Uzbekistan) D Istomin | 6^{1} | 6^{0}
Q | (Latvia) E Gulbis | 4 | 4
2 | (France) L Pouille | 6 | 6

Second round
7 | (Serbia) F Krajinović | 7^{7} | 6
WC | (Cyprus) M Baghdatis | 6^{2} | 4
(Russia) E Donskoy | 6 | 6
4 | (Bosnia and Herzegovina) D Džumhur | 1 | 1
8 | (Japan) Y Sugita | 7^{7} | 6
(Germany) J-L Struff | 6^{4} | 4
(Russia) K Khachanov | 4 | 6 | 3
2 | (France) L Pouille | 6 | 3 | 6

Quarterfinals
7 | (Serbia) F Krajinović | 6 | 6
(Russia) E Donskoy | 1 | 2
8 | (Japan) Y Sugita | 6 | 3 | 2
2 | (France) L Pouille | 3 | 6 | 6

Semifinals
7 | (Serbia) F Krajinović | 3 | 7^{7} | 6^{5}
2 | (France) L Pouille | 6 | 6^{4} | 7^{7}

== Qualifying ==
=== Seeds ===
1. (Slovakia) Lukáš Lacko (first round)
2. (India) Yuki Bhambri (qualifying competition)
3. (France) Quentin Halys (qualified)
4. (Slovenia) Blaž Kavčič (qualifying competition, lucky loser)
5. (Spain) Marcel Granollers (first round)
6. (Italy) Stefano Travaglia (qualifying competition)
7. (Germany) Yannick Maden (qualified)
8. (France) Gleb Sakharov (qualified)

=== Qualifiers ===
1. (Latvia) Ernests Gulbis
2. (Germany) Yannick Maden
3. (France) Quentin Halys
4. (France) Gleb Sakharov

=== Lucky loser ===
1. (Slovenia) Blaž Kavčič

=== Qualifying draw ===
==== First qualifier ====
First round
1 | (Slovakia) Lukáš Lacko | 4 | 4
(Latvia) Ernests Gulbis | 6 | 6
(Egypt) Karim-Mohamed Maamoun | 3 | 6^{4}
6 | (Italy) Stefano Travaglia | 6 | 7^{7}

Qualifying competition
(Latvia) Ernests Gulbis | 6 | 6
6 | (Italy) Stefano Travaglia | 3 | 2

==== Second qualifier ====
First round
2 | (India) Yuki Bhambri | 6 | 6
WC | (Croatia) Ivan Dodig | 2 | 1
(Croatia) Viktor Galović | 4 | 4
7 | (Germany) Yannick Maden | 6 | 6

Qualifying competition
2 | (India) Yuki Bhambri | 1 | 1
7 | (Germany) Yannick Maden | 6 | 6

==== Third qualifier ====
First round
3 | (France) Quentin Halys | 6 | 6
(Germany) Matthias Bachinger | 4 | 1
WC | (Australia) Alexei Popyrin | 6 | 6
5 | (Spain) Marcel Granollers | 3 | 0

Qualifying competition
3 | (France) Quentin Halys | 7^{7} | 6
WC | (Australia) Alexei Popyrin | 6^{5} | 4

==== Fourth qualifier ====
First round
4 | (Slovenia) Blaž Kavčič | 2 | 6 | 4
(India) Sumit Nagal | 6 | 2 | 0^{r}
WC | (United States) Rajeev Ram | 2 | 3
8 | (France) Gleb Sakharov | 6 | 6

Qualifying competition
4 | (Slovenia) Blaž Kavčič | 3 | 4
8 | (France) Gleb Sakharov | 6 | 6
