= 2018 Dubai Tennis Championships =

- Date: 19–25 February (women); 26 February – 3 March (men)
- Edition: 26th (men) / 18th (women)
- Category: ATP World Tour 500 (men); WTA Premier (women)
- Draw: 32S / 16D (men); 28S / 16D (women)
- Prize money: $ (ATP) $2,000,000 (WTA)
- Surface: Hard, Outdoor
- Location: Dubai, United Arab Emirates
- Venue: Aviation Club Tennis Centre

Champions

Men's singles
- (Spain) Roberto Bautista Agut

Women's singles
- (Ukraine) Elina Svitolina

Men's doubles
- (Netherlands) Jean-Julien Rojer / (Romania) Horia Tecău

Women's doubles
- (Chinese Taipei) Chan Hao-ching / (China) Yang Zhaoxuan
- Dubai Tennis Championships

The 2018 Dubai Tennis Championships (also known as the Dubai Duty Free Tennis Championships for sponsorship reasons) was an ATP 500 event on the 2018 ATP World Tour and a WTA Premier event on the 2018 WTA Tour. Both events were held at the Aviation Club Tennis Centre in Dubai, United Arab Emirates. The women's tournament took place from 19 February until 25 February 2018, while the men's tournament took place from 26 February through 3 March 2018.

== Finals ==
=== Men's singles ===
- (Spain) Roberto Bautista Agut defeated (France) Lucas Pouille, 6–3, 6–4

=== Women's singles ===
- (Ukraine) Elina Svitolina defeated (Russia) Daria Kasatkina, 6–4, 6–0

=== Men's doubles ===
- (Netherlands) Jean-Julien Rojer / (Romania) Horia Tecău defeated (United States) James Cerretani / (India) Leander Paes, 6–2, 7–6^{(7–2)}

=== Women's doubles ===
- (Chinese Taipei) Chan Hao-ching / (China) Yang Zhaoxuan defeated (Chinese Taipei) Hsieh Su-wei / (China) Peng Shuai, 4–6, 6–2, [10–6]

== Points and prize money ==
=== Point distribution ===
Event	W	F	SF	QF	Round of 16	Round of 32	Q	Q3	Q2	Q1
Men's singles	500	300	180	90	45	0	20	—N/a	10	0
Men's doubles	500	300	180	90	0	—N/a	45	—N/a	25	0
Women's singles	470	305	185	100	55	1	25	18	13	1
Women's doubles	470	305	185	100	1	—N/a	—N/a	—N/a	—N/a	—N/a

=== Prize money ===
Event	W	F	SF	QF	Round of 16	Round of 32	Q3	Q2	Q1
Men's singles	$511,750	$240,340	$119,340	$59,670	$30,235	$15,910	—N/a	$2,655	$1,460
Men's doubles	$150,800	$71,270	$34,390	$17,890	$9,370	—N/a	—N/a	—N/a	—N/a
Women's singles	$465,480	$254,124	$136,138	$35,723	$19,809	$10,950	$5,408	$2,951	$1,854
Women's doubles	$74,042	$39,184	$20,087	$10,042	$5,223	—N/a	—N/a	—N/a	—N/a
Doubles prize money per team

== ATP singles main-draw entrants ==
=== Seeds ===
Country	Player	Ranking^{1}	Seed
BUL	Grigor Dimitrov	4	1
FRA	Lucas Pouille	16	2
ESP	Roberto Bautista Agut	22	3
BIH	Damir Džumhur	29	4
FRA	Richard Gasquet	34	5
GER	Philipp Kohlschreiber	35	6
SRB	Filip Krajinović	36	7
JPN	Yūichi Sugita	41	8

- Rankings are as of February 19, 2018.

=== Other entrants ===
The following players received wildcards into the singles main draw:

- (Cyprus) Marcos Baghdatis
- (Tunisia) Malek Jaziri
- (Greece) Stefanos Tsitsipas

The following player received entry as a special exempt:

- (Belarus) Ilya Ivashka

The following players received entry using a protected ranking:

- (Austria) Andreas Haider-Maurer
- (Japan) Yoshihito Nishioka

The following players received entry from the qualifying draw:

- (Latvia) Ernests Gulbis
- (France) Quentin Halys
- (Germany) Yannick Maden
- (France) Gleb Sakharov

The following player received entry as a lucky loser:

- (Slovenia) Blaž Kavčič

=== Withdrawals ===
Before the tournament

- (Italy) Paolo Lorenzi → replaced by (Slovenia) Blaž Kavčič

== ATP doubles main-draw entrants ==
=== Seeds ===
Country	Player	Country	Player	Rank^{1}	Seed
FIN	Henri Kontinen	AUS	John Peers	7	1
NED	Jean-Julien Rojer	ROU	Horia Tecău	21	2
CRO	Ivan Dodig	USA	Rajeev Ram	34	3
RSA	Raven Klaasen	NZL	Michael Venus	44	4

- Rankings are as of February 19, 2018.

=== Other entrants ===
The following pairs received wildcards into the doubles main draw:

- (United States) James Cerretani / (India) Leander Paes
- (Uzbekistan) Denis Istomin / (Canada) Daniel Nestor

The following pair received entry from the qualifying draw:

- (Germany) Jan-Lennard Struff / (Serbia) Viktor Troicki

The following pair received entry as lucky losers:

- (Austria) Andreas Haider-Maurer / (Germany) Florian Mayer

=== Withdrawals ===
Before the tournament

- (Russia) Karen Khachanov

== WTA singles main-draw entrants ==
=== Seeds ===
Country	Player	Ranking^{1}	Seed
UKR	Elina Svitolina	3	1
ESP	Garbiñe Muguruza	4	2
CZE	Karolína Plíšková	5	3
LAT	Jeļena Ostapenko	6	4
FRA	Caroline Garcia	7	5
GER	Angelique Kerber	9	6
GBR	Johanna Konta	11	7
FRA	Kristina Mladenovic	13	8

- Rankings are as of February 12, 2018.

=== Other entrants ===
The following players received wildcards into the singles main draw:

- (United States) Catherine Bellis
- (United Kingdom) Johanna Konta
- (Japan) Naomi Osaka
- (Latvia) Jeļena Ostapenko

The following players received entry from the qualifying draw:

- (Italy) Sara Errani
- (Australia) Samantha Stosur
- (Ukraine) Lesia Tsurenko
- (Russia) Sofya Zhuk

The following player received entry as a lucky loser:

- (China) Wang Qiang

=== Withdrawals ===
- (Australia) Ashleigh Barty → replaced by (Russia) Ekaterina Makarova
- (Germany) Julia Görges → replaced by (Spain) Carla Suárez Navarro
- (United States) Madison Keys → replaced by (Belgium) Elise Mertens
- (Czech Republic) Petra Kvitová → replaced by (China) Wang Qiang
- (Croatia) Mirjana Lučić-Baroni → replaced by (Estonia) Anett Kontaveit

== WTA doubles main-draw entrants ==
=== Seeds ===
Country	Player	Country	Player	Rank^{1}	Seed
RUS	Ekaterina Makarova	RUS	Elena Vesnina	6	1
TPE	Latisha Chan	CZE	Andrea Sestini Hlaváčková	7	2
CZE	Lucie Šafářová	CZE	Barbora Strýcová	22	3
TPE	Hsieh Su-wei	CHN	Peng Shuai	41	4

- Rankings are as of February 12, 2018.

=== Other entrants ===
The following pair received a wildcard into the doubles main draw:

- (Germany) Lisa Ponomar / (United Kingdom) Eden Silva

=== Withdrawals ===
During the tournament

- (Czech Republic) Lucie Šafářová
