= 2018 Dubai Tennis Championships – Women's doubles =

Women's doubles
- 2018 Dubai Tennis Championships

Final
- Champions: (Chinese Taipei) Chan Hao-ching (China) Yang Zhaoxuan
- Runners-up: (Chinese Taipei) Hsieh Su-wei (China) Peng Shuai
- Score: 4–6, 6–2, [10–6]

Events
Singles	men	women
Doubles	men	women
- Dubai Tennis Championships

Ekaterina Makarova and Elena Vesnina were the defending champions, but lost to Hsieh Su-wei and Peng Shuai in the semifinals.

Chan Hao-ching and Yang Zhaoxuan won the title, defeating Hsieh and Peng in the final, 4–6, 6–2, [10–6].

== Seeds ==
1. (Russia) Ekaterina Makarova / (Russia) Elena Vesnina (semifinals)
2. (Chinese Taipei) Latisha Chan / (Czech Republic) Andrea Sestini Hlaváčková (quarterfinals)
3. (Czech Republic) Lucie Šafářová / (Czech Republic) Barbora Strýcová (quarterfinals, withdrew)
4. (Chinese Taipei) Hsieh Su-wei / (China) Peng Shuai (final)

== Draw ==
Key

- Q = Qualifier
- WC = Wild card
- LL = Lucky loser
- Alt = Alternate
- ITF = ITF entry
- PR = Protected ranking
- SR = Special ranking
- SE = Special exempt
- JE = Junior exempt
- JR = Junior Accelerator Programme entrant
- CO = College Accelerator Programme entrant
- NG = Next Gen Accelerator Program entrant
- w/o = Walkover
- r = Retired
- d = Defaulted

=== Draw ===
First round
1	(Russia) E Makarova (Russia) E Vesnina	6	6
(Japan) S Aoyama (Slovenia) K Srebotnik	1	2
(Japan) M Kato (Japan) M Ninomiya	6	6^{2}	[10]
WC	(Germany) L Ponomar (United Kingdom) E Silva	2	7^{7}	[7]
4	(Chinese Taipei) S-w Hsieh (China) S Peng	6	6
(Netherlands) K Bertens (Netherlands) D Schuurs	1	0
(Latvia) J Ostapenko (Latvia) A Sevastova	2	3
(United States) N Melichar (Czech Republic) K Peschke	6	6
(Slovenia) A Klepač (Spain) MJ Martínez Sánchez	6	1	[5]
(Chinese Taipei) H-c Chan (China) Z Yang	4	6	[10]
(United States) R Atawo (Germany) A-L Grönefeld	4	4
3	(Czech Republic) L Šafářová (Czech Republic) B Strýcová	6	6
(Poland) A Rosolska (United States) A Spears	6	6
(Russia) A Pavlyuchenkova (Ukraine) O Savchuk	2	0
(Ukraine) N Kichenok (Australia) An Rodionova	3	1
2	(Chinese Taipei) L Chan (Czech Republic) A Sestini Hlaváčková	6	6

Quarterfinals
1	(Russia) E Makarova (Russia) E Vesnina	6	6
(Japan) M Kato (Japan) M Ninomiya	4	1
4	(Chinese Taipei) S-w Hsieh (China) S Peng	6	0	[10]
(United States) N Melichar (Czech Republic) K Peschke	4	6	[7]
(Chinese Taipei) H-c Chan (China) Z Yang	w/o
3	(Czech Republic) L Šafářová (Czech Republic) B Strýcová
(Poland) A Rosolska (United States) A Spears	1	7^{7}	[10]
2	(Chinese Taipei) L Chan (Czech Republic) A Sestini Hlaváčková	6	6^{5}	[8]

Semifinals
1	(Russia) E Makarova (Russia) E Vesnina	1	6	[7]
4	(Chinese Taipei) S-w Hsieh (China) S Peng	6	3	[10]
(Chinese Taipei) H-c Chan (China) Z Yang	6	7
(Poland) A Rosolska (United States) A Spears	4	5

Final
4	(Chinese Taipei) S-w Hsieh (China) S Peng	6	2	[6]
(Chinese Taipei) H-c Chan (China) Z Yang	4	6	[10]
