= 2013 ITF Women's Circuit – Wenshan =

- Date: 22–28 April
- Edition: 3rd
- Location: Wenshan City, China

Champions

Singles
- (China) Zhang Yuxuan

Doubles
- (Japan) Miki Miyamura / (Thailand) Varatchaya Wongteanchai
← 2012 ·	ITF Women's Circuit – Wenshan	· 2014 →

The 2013 ITF Women's Circuit – Wenshan was a professional tennis tournament played on outdoor hard courts. It was the third edition of the tournament which was part of the 2013 ITF Women's Circuit, offering a total of $50,000 in prize money. It took place in Wenshan City, China, on 22–28 April 2013.

== WTA entrants ==
=== Seeds ===
Country	Player	Rank^{1}	Seed
CHN	Duan Yingying	117	1
CHN	Zheng Saisai	161	2
CHN	Wang Qiang	187	3
JPN	Yurika Sema	203	4
KAZ	Zarina Diyas	218	5
THA	Varatchaya Wongteanchai	228	6
JPN	Junri Namigata	244	7
TPE	Chan Chin-wei	264	8

- ^{1} Rankings as of 15 April 2013

=== Other entrants ===
The following players received wildcards into the singles main draw:

- (China) Tian Ran
- (China) Yang Zhaoxuan
- (China) Yi Mengjuan
- (China) Zhang Kailin

The following players received entry from the qualifying draw:

- (South Korea) Jang Su-jeong
- (China) Liu Fangzhou
- (Japan) Miki Miyamura
- (China) Zhao Di

== Champions ==
=== Singles ===
- (China) Zhang Yuxuan def. (China) Wang Qiang 1–6, 7–6^{(7–4)}, 6–2

=== Doubles ===
- (Japan) Miki Miyamura / (Thailand) Varatchaya Wongteanchai def. (Japan) Rika Fujiwara / (Japan) Junri Namigata 7–5, 6–3
