= 2018 Dubai Tennis Championships – Women's singles =

Women's singles
- 2018 Dubai Tennis Championships

Final
- Champion: (Ukraine) Elina Svitolina
- Runner-up: (Russia) Daria Kasatkina
- Score: 6–4, 6–0

Details
- Draw: 28
- Seeds: 8

Events
Singles	men	women
Doubles	men	women
- Dubai Tennis Championships

Defending champion Elina Svitolina defeated Daria Kasatkina in the final, 6–4, 6–0 to win the women's singles tennis title at the 2018 Dubai Tennis Championships.

En route to the final, Kasatkina saved match points in two different matches: against Johanna Konta in the second round and Garbiñe Muguruza in the semifinals.

Since Caroline Wozniacki was defending finalist points from 2017 and chose not to participate this year, Simona Halep regained the WTA no. 1 singles ranking at the conclusion of the tournament.

== Seeds ==
The top four seeds received a bye into the second round.

1. (Ukraine) Elina Svitolina (champion)
2. (Spain) Garbiñe Muguruza (semifinals)
3. (Czech Republic) Karolína Plíšková (quarterfinals)
4. (Latvia) Jeļena Ostapenko (second round)
5. (France) Caroline Garcia (quarterfinals)
6. (Germany) Angelique Kerber (semifinals)
7. (United Kingdom) Johanna Konta (second round)
8. (France) Kristina Mladenovic (first round)

== Draw ==
Key

- Q = Qualifier
- WC = Wild card
- LL = Lucky loser
- Alt = Alternate
- ITF = ITF entry
- PR = Protected ranking
- SR = Special ranking
- SE = Special exempt
- JE = Junior exempt
- JR = Junior Accelerator Programme entrant
- CO = College Accelerator Programme entrant
- NG = Next Gen Accelerator Program entrant
- w/o = Walkover
- r = Retired
- d = Defaulted

=== Finals ===
Semifinals
1	(Ukraine) Elina Svitolina	6	6
6	(Germany) Angelique Kerber	3	3
(Russia) Daria Kasatkina	3	7^{13}	6
2	(Spain) Garbiñe Muguruza	6	6^{11}	1

Final
1	(Ukraine) Elina Svitolina	6	6
(Russia) Daria Kasatkina	4	0

=== Top half ===
First round
LL	(China) Q Wang	6	6
(Netherlands) K Bertens	3	0
(Estonia) A Kontaveit	1	6	6
Q	(Australia) S Stosur	6	2	4
WC	(Japan) N Osaka	6	6
8	(France) K Mladenovic	2	2
Q	(Russia) S Zhuk	2	2
(Spain) C Suárez Navarro	6	6
Q	(Italy) S Errani	6	6
Q	(Ukraine) L Tsurenko	4	3
(Czech Republic) B Strýcová	2	1
6	(Germany) A Kerber	6	6

Second round
1	(Ukraine) E Svitolina	6	5	6
LL	(China) Q Wang	1	7	2
(Estonia) A Kontaveit	2	6^{5}
WC	(Japan) N Osaka	6	7^{7}
3	(Czech Republic) Ka Plíšková	5	6	6
(Spain) C Suárez Navarro	7	2	4
Q	(Italy) S Errani	4	2
6	(Germany) A Kerber	6	6

Quarterfinals
1	(Ukraine) E Svitolina	6	6
WC	(Japan) N Osaka	2	4
3	(Czech Republic) Ka Plíšková	4	3
6	(Germany) A Kerber	6	6

Semifinals
1	(Ukraine) E Svitolina	6	6
6	(Germany) A Kerber	3	3

=== Bottom half ===
First round
7/WC	(United Kingdom) J Konta	7^{7}	6
(Russia) A Pavlyuchenkova	6^{2}	2
(Russia) D Kasatkina	7	6
(Poland) A Radwańska	5	4
(Russia) E Vesnina	6	7
(China) S Peng	4	5
5	(France) C Garcia	6	7
(Czech Republic) L Šafářová	3	5
(Russia) E Makarova	3	7^{11}	6
(Latvia) A Sevastova	6	6^{9}	3
WC	(United States) C Bellis	6	6
(Belgium) E Mertens	3	3

Second round
7/WC	(United Kingdom) J Konta	6	6^{6}	2
(Russia) D Kasatkina	4	7^{8}	6
(Russia) E Vesnina	6	7^{8}
4/WC	(Latvia) J Ostapenko	1	6^{6}
5	(France) C Garcia	6	6
(Russia) E Makarova	4	2
WC	(United States) C Bellis	3	5
2	(Spain) G Muguruza	6	7

Quarterfinals
(Russia) D Kasatkina	7^{7}	6
(Russia) E Vesnina	6^{5}	1
5	(France) C Garcia	5	2
2	(Spain) G Muguruza	7	6

Semifinals
(Russia) D Kasatkina	3	7^{13}	6
2	(Spain) G Muguruza	6	6^{11}	1

== Qualifying ==
=== Seeds ===
1. (Spain) Carla Suárez Navarro (moved to main draw)
2. (Ukraine) Lesia Tsurenko (qualified)
3. (Australia) Samantha Stosur (qualified)
4. (China) Wang Qiang (qualifying competition, Lucky loser)
5. (Japan) Naomi Osaka (Received wildcard to main draw)
6. (Kazakhstan) Zarina Diyas (qualifying competition)
7. (Czech Republic) Markéta Vondroušová (first round)
8. (Greece) Maria Sakkari (qualifying competition)
9. (Italy) Camila Giorgi (second round, retired)
10. (Belarus) Aryna Sabalenka (qualifying competition)

=== Qualifiers ===
1. (Italy) Sara Errani
2. (Ukraine) Lesia Tsurenko
3. (Australia) Samantha Stosur
4. (Russia) Sofya Zhuk

=== Lucky loser ===
1. (China) Wang Qiang

=== Draw ===
==== First qualifier ====
First round
10	(Belarus) Aryna Sabalenka	6	6
(China) Zhu Lin	1	3
(Slovakia) Chantal Škamlová	2	0
(Japan) Miyu Kato	6	6
(Italy) Sara Errani	6	6
Alt	(Japan) Shuko Aoyama	1	0
(United States) Bernarda Pera	0	6	6
7	(Czech Republic) Markéta Vondroušová	6	3	0

Second round
10	(Belarus) Aryna Sabalenka	6	6
(Japan) Miyu Kato	3	4
(Italy) Sara Errani	6	6
(United States) Bernarda Pera	4	4

Qualifying competition
10	(Belarus) Aryna Sabalenka	2	6	6^{4}
(Italy) Sara Errani	6	1	7^{7}

==== Second qualifier ====
First round
2	(Ukraine) Lesia Tsurenko	5	7	6
(China) Duan Yingying	7	5	4
WC	(Tunisia) Ons Jabeur	6^{5}	6	6
WC	(Oman) Fatma Al-Nabhani	7^{7}	0	2
Alt	(Russia) Veronika Kudermetova	6	6
Alt	(Ukraine) Katarina Zavatska	3	0
WC	(United Kingdom) Eden Silva	1	3
6	(Kazakhstan) Zarina Diyas	6	6

Second round
2	(Ukraine) Lesia Tsurenko	6	6
WC	(Tunisia) Ons Jabeur	3	3
Alt	(Russia) Veronika Kudermetova	0	5
6	(Kazakhstan) Zarina Diyas	6	7

Qualifying competition
2	(Ukraine) Lesia Tsurenko	6	6
6	(Kazakhstan) Zarina Diyas	1	2

==== Third qualifier ====
First round
3/WC	(Australia) Samantha Stosur	6	6
Alt	(India) Ankita Raina	4	4
(United States) Christina McHale	7	6
(France) Amandine Hesse	5	3
PR	(Slovakia) Kristína Kučová	3	6	0
(Chinese Taipei) Hsieh Su-wei	6	4	6
(China) Wang Yafan	6	3	4
8	(Greece) Maria Sakkari	4	6	6

Second round
3/WC	(Australia) Samantha Stosur	6	6
(United States) Christina McHale	4	2
(Chinese Taipei) Hsieh Su-wei	5	5
8	(Greece) Maria Sakkari	7	7

Qualifying competition
3/WC	(Australia) Samantha Stosur	6	6
8	(Greece) Maria Sakkari	1	4

==== Fourth qualifier ====
First round
4	(China) Wang Qiang	6	6
(Russia) Valentyna Ivakhnenko	1	0
(Japan) Junri Namigata	6	6^{5}	3
(Montenegro) Danka Kovinić	4	7^{7}	6
(Romania) Alexandra Dulgheru	6^{2}	6^{7}
(Russia) Sofya Zhuk	7^{7}	7^{9}
(Japan) Nao Hibino	2	3
9	(Italy) Camila Giorgi	6	6

Second round
4	(China) Wang Qiang	6	5	6
(Montenegro) Danka Kovinić	2	7	3
(Russia) Sofya Zhuk	4	4
9	(Italy) Camila Giorgi	6	3^{r}

Qualifying competition
4	(China) Wang Qiang	1	2
(Russia) Sofya Zhuk	6	6
