= ITF Women's Circuit – Wenshan =

ITF Women's Tour
- Event name: ITF Women's Circuit – Wenshan
- Location: Wenshan City, China
- Venue: Wenshan Sports Center Tennis Stadium
- Category: ITF Women's Circuit
- Surface: Hard / Outdoor
- Draw: 32S/32Q/16D
- Prize money: $50,000

The ITF Women's Circuit – Wenshan was a tournament for female professional tennis players played on outdoor hard courts. The event was classified as a $50,000 ITF Women's Circuit tournament. It was held in Wenshan City, China, in 2011–2013.

== Past finals ==
=== Singles ===
Year	Champion	Runner-up	Score
2013	(China) Zhang Yuxuan	(China) Wang Qiang	1–6, 7–6^{(7–4)}, 6–2
2012	(Chinese Taipei) Hsieh Su-wei	(China) Zheng Saisai	6–3, 6–3
2011	(France) Iryna Brémond	(Croatia) Ani Mijačika	7–5, 3–6, 7–5

=== Doubles ===
Year	Champions	Runners-up	Score
2013	(Japan) Miki Miyamura (Thailand) Varatchaya Wongteanchai	(Japan) Rika Fujiwara (Japan) Junri Namigata	7–5, 6–3
2012	(Chinese Taipei) Hsieh Shu-ying (Chinese Taipei) Hsieh Su-wei	(China) Liu Wanting (China) Xu Yifan	6–3, 6–2
2011	(Japan) Shuko Aoyama (Japan) Rika Fujiwara	(China) Liang Chen (China) Tian Ran	6–4, 6–0
