= Hsieh Yu-chieh =

Taiwanese tennis player (born 1993)

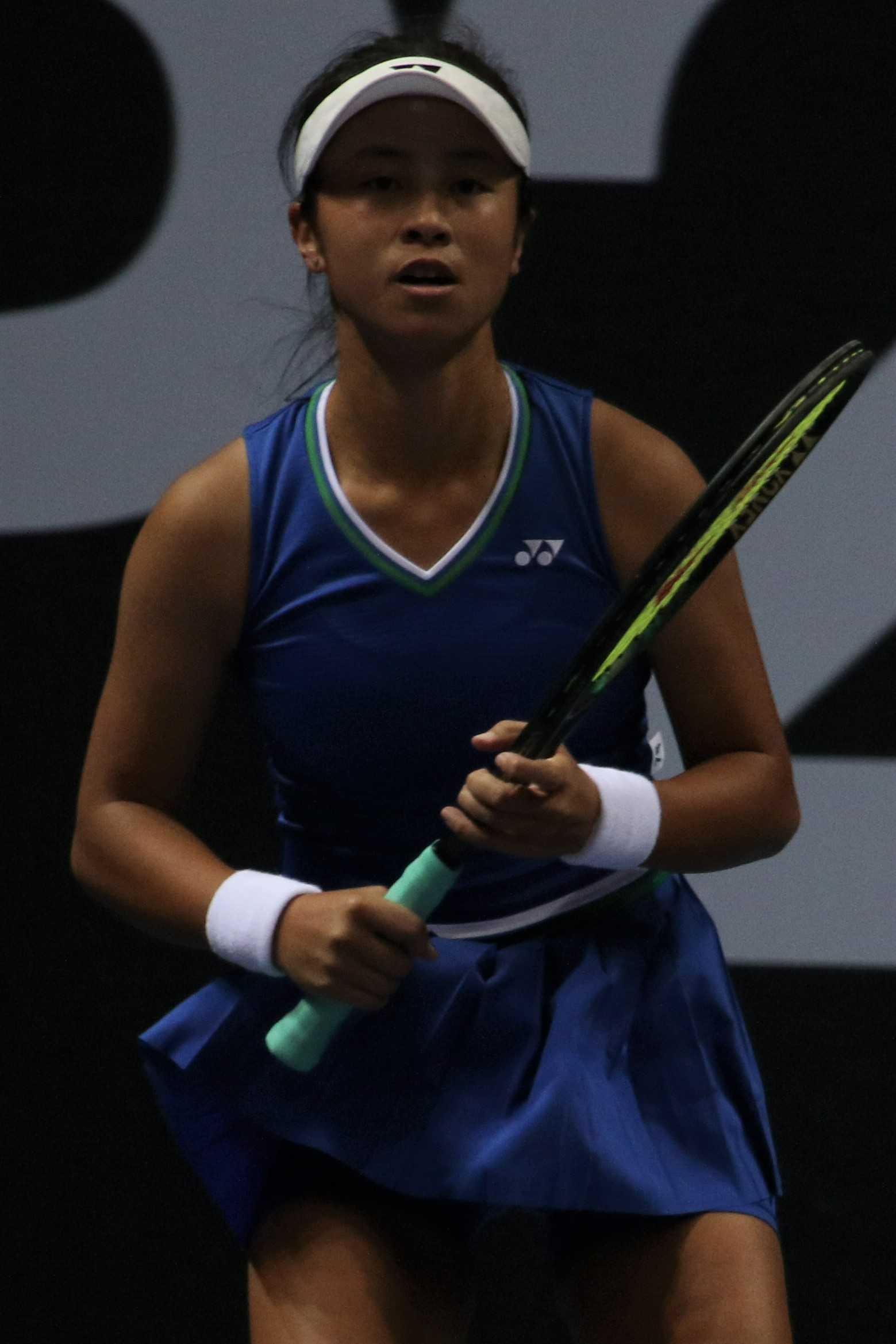
- Hsieh at the 2021 Open Angers Arena Loire
- Country (sports): Chinese Taipei
- Born: 23 July 1993 (age 33) Hsinchu, Taiwan
- Height: 1.67 m (5 ft 6 in)
- Turned pro: March 2012
- Plays: Right (two-handed both sides)
- Coach: Hsieh Tzu-lung
- Prize money: $107,495

Singles
- Career record: 49–102
- Highest ranking: No. 830 (6 February 2012)

Doubles
- Career record: 197–198
- Career titles: 1 WTA 125
- Highest ranking: No. 129 (21 October 2019)

Other doubles tournaments
- Olympic Games: 1R (2021)
Medal record
Universiade
Women's Tennis
Representing Chinese Taipei
Gold medal – first place	2015 Gwangju	Women's team

Hsieh Yu-chieh
- Traditional Chinese: 謝語倢
- Simplified Chinese: 谢语倢
Transcriptions
Standard Mandarin
- Hanyu Pinyin: Xiè Yǔjié

Hsieh Yu-chieh (Chinese: 謝語倢, born 23 July 1993), formerly known as Hsieh Shu-ying (Chinese: 謝淑映), is a Taiwanese professional tennis and pickleball player. She is the younger sister of tennis players Hsieh Su-wei and Hsieh Cheng-peng.

On 6 February 2012, she achieved her career-high singles ranking of world No. 830. On 21 October 2019, she peaked at No. 129 in the doubles rankings. Hsieh has won one WTA 125 doubles title and ten doubles titles on the ITF Women's Circuit.

== Tennis career ==
Yu-chieh started to play tennis at the age of five. Her favourite surface is hardcourt.

On 13 April 2012, she won her first doubles title at an $50k tournament in Wenshan City, China. She and sister Hsieh Su-wei defeated the home team of Liu Wanting and Xu Yifan in the final.

On 26 May 2012, Yu-chieh won her second ITF doubles title, at a $25k event at Karuizawa, Japan. She played with Kumiko Iijima of Japan, beating Samantha Murray and Emily Webley-Smith in three sets.

She made her first WTA Tour quarterfinal at the International-level tournament in 2012 Guangzhou, China, partnering with her sister Hsieh Su-wei.

On 24 March 2014, she won her third ITF doubles title, at a $50k event in Osprey, Florida. She played with Rika Fujiwara of Japan, beating Irina Falconi and Eva Hrdinová in three sets.

Teaming up with her sister, she won her first WTA 125 title at the 2017 Hawaii Open, defeating Eri Hozumi and Asia Muhammad in the final.

Her first WTA Tour final was at the 2018 Korea Open, where she and Hsieh Su-wei were defeated by Choi Ji-hee and Han Na-lae. They also reached the final at the 2019 Pan Pacific Open, but lost to fellow Taiwanese sister team Latisha Chan and Chan Hao-ching.

== WTA Tour finals ==
=== Doubles: 2 (2 runner-ups) ===
Legend WTA 500 (0–1) WTA 250 (0–1)	Finals by surface Hard (0–2)

Result	W–L	Date	Tournament	Tier	Surface	Partner	Opponents	Score
Loss	0–1	Sep 2018	Korea Open, South Korea	International (Note: The WTA International tournaments were reclassified as WTA 250 tournaments in 2021.)	Hard	(Chinese Taipei) Hsieh Su-wei	(South Korea) Choi Ji-hee (South Korea) Han Na-lae	3–6, 2–6
Loss	0–2	Sep 2019	Pan Pacific Open, Japan	Premier (Note: The WTA Premier tournaments were reclassified as WTA 500 tournaments in 2021.)	Hard	(Chinese Taipei) Hsieh Su-wei	(Chinese Taipei) Latisha Chan (Chinese Taipei) Chan Hao-ching	5–7, 5–7

== WTA 125 finals ==
=== Doubles: 2 (1 title, 1 runner-up) ===
Result	W–L	Date	Tournament	Surface	Partner	Opponents	Score
Win	1–0	Nov 2017	Hawaii Open, United States	Hard	(Chinese Taipei) Hsieh Su-wei	(Japan) Eri Hozumi (United States) Asia Muhammad	6–1, 7–6^{(3)}
Loss	1–1	Aug 2021	Chicago Challenger, US	Hard	(Germany) Mona Barthel	(Japan) Eri Hozumi (Thailand) Peangtarn Plipuech	5–7, 2–6

== ITF Circuit finals ==
=== Doubles: 20 (10 titles, 10 runner-ups) ===
Legend $75,000 tournaments (0–1) $50/60,000 tournaments (3–3) $25/35,000 tournaments (5–4) $10/15,000 tournaments (2–2)	Finals by surface Hard (4–8) Clay (5–2) Grass (1–0)

Result	W–L	Date	Tournament	Tier	Surface	Partner	Opponents	Score
Loss	0–1	Oct 2007	ITF Taoyuan, Taiwan	50,000	Hard	(Chinese Taipei) Hsieh Su-wei	(Chinese Taipei) Chan Hao-ching (Chinese Taipei) Chan Yung-jan	1–6, 6–2, [12–14]
Loss	0–2	Jun 2011	ITF Taipei, Taiwan	10,000	Hard	(Chinese Taipei) Juan Ting-fei	(Chinese Taipei) Chan Chin-wei (Chinese Taipei) Kao Shao-yuan	1–6, 5–7
Loss	0–3	Feb 2012	Launceston International, Australia	25,000	Hard	(China) Zheng Saisai	(Japan) Kotomi Takahata (Japan) Shuko Aoyama	4–6, 4–6
Win	1–3	Apr 2012	ITF Wenshan, China	50,000	Hard	(Chinese Taipei) Hsieh Su-wei	(China) Liu Wanting (China) Xu Yifan	6–3, 6–2
Win	2–3	May 2012	ITF Karuizawa, Japan	25,000	Grass	(Japan) Kumiko Iijima	(United Kingdom) Samantha Murray (United Kingdom) Emily Webley-Smith	3–6, 7–6, [10–1]
Loss	2–4	Dec 2013	ITF Hong Kong, China SAR	10,000	Hard	(Chinese Taipei) Yang Chia-hsien	(South Korea) Hong Seung-yeon (South Korea) Lee Hye-min	1–6, 6–7^{(2)}
Win	3–4	Mar 2014	Osprey Challenger, US	50,000	Clay	(Japan) Rika Fujiwara	(United States) Irina Falconi (Czech Republic) Eva Hrdinová	6–3, 6–7^{(5)}, [10–4]
Loss	3–5	Apr 2014	Kangaroo Cup, Japan	75,000	Hard	(Japan) Misaki Doi	(Australia) Jarmila Gajdošová (Australia) Arina Rodionova	3–6, 3–6
Win	4–5	Oct 2016	ITF Porto, Portugal	10,000	Clay	(Chinese Taipei) Hsieh Su-wei	(Portugal) Francisca Jorge (Portugal) Rita Vilaça	6–3, 6–4
Win	5–5	Jun 2017	ITF Hammamet, Tunisia	15,000	Clay	(Chinese Taipei) Wu Fang-hsien	(Chile) Fernanda Brito (Bolivia) Noelia Zeballos	5–7, 6–3, [11–9]
Loss	5–6	Aug 2018	Jinan Open, China	60,000	Hard	(China) Lu Jingjing	(China) Wang Xinyu (China) You Xiaodi	3–6, 7–6^{(5)}, [2–10]
Win	6–6	Jan 2019	ITF Plantation, US	25,000	Clay	(Chinese Taipei) Lee Pei-chi	(Belarus) Olga Govortsova (United States) Jada Robinson	6–1, 6–4
Win	7–6	Jun 2019	ITF Daegu, South Korea	25,000	Hard	(Chinese Taipei) Lee Pei-chi	(South Korea) Choi Ji-hee (South Korea) Han Na-lae	6–3, 7–6^{(5)}
Loss	7–7	Feb 2020	Indoor Championships, Japan	60,000	Hard (i)	(Japan) Minori Yonehara	(Japan) Erina Hayashi (Japan) Moyuka Uchijima	5–7, 7–5, [6–10]
Win	8–7	Nov 2021	ITF Funchal, Portugal	25,000	Hard	(United Kingdom) Alicia Barnett	(Portugal) Inês Murta (Latvia) Daniela Vismane	6–1, 3–6, [10–8]
Loss	8–8	April 2022	ITF Orlando, US	25,000	Clay	(Chinese Taipei) Hsu Chieh-yu	(United States) Catherine Harrison (United States) Maegan Manasse	1–6, 0–6
Win	9–8	May 2022	ITF Daytona Beach, US	25,000	Clay	(Chinese Taipei) Hsu Chieh-yu	(Switzerland) Chelsea Fontenel (United States) Hina Inoue	7–5, 6–0
Loss	9–9	May 2022	ITF Sarasota, US	25,000	Clay	(Chinese Taipei) Hsu Chieh-yu	(China) Ma Yexin (Lithuania) Akvilė Paražinskaitė	2–6, 5–7
Win	10–9	Nov 2022	Tokyo Open, Japan	W60	Hard (i)	(Indonesia) Jessy Rompies	(Japan) Mai Hontama (Japan) Junri Namigata	6–4, 6–3
Loss	10–10	Jun 2024	ITF Taipei, Taiwan	W35	Hard	(Chinese Taipei) Lin Fang-an	(Chinese Taipei) Cho Yi-tsen (Chinese Taipei) Cho I-hsuan	2–6, 6–1, [5–10]
