= 2021 WTA 125 tournaments =

Details
- Duration: 3 May – 26 December 2021
- Edition: 10th
- Tournaments: 15

Achievements (singles)
- Most titles: (Spain) Nuria Párrizas Díaz (2)
- Most finals: (Italy) Jasmine Paolini (Spain) Nuria Párrizas Díaz (France) Diane Parry (Netherlands) Arantxa Rus (2)

The WTA 125 tournaments are the secondary professional tennis circuit organised by the Women's Tennis Association. The 2021 calendar consisted of fifteen tournaments due to the impacts of the COVID-19 pandemic.

== Schedule ==
Week of	Tournament	Champions	Runners-up	Semifinalists	Quarterfinalists
May 3	L'Open 35 de Saint-Malo; Saint-Malo, France; Clay – $115,000 – 32S/11Q/13D; Singles – Doubles	(Switzerland) Viktorija Golubic; 6–1, 6–3	(Italy) Jasmine Paolini	(France) Harmony Tan (Russia) Varvara Gracheva	(Spain) Aliona Bolsova (Belarus) Aliaksandra Sasnovich (Slovakia) Anna Karolína Schmiedlová (Sweden) Rebecca Peterson
May 3	L'Open 35 de Saint-Malo; Saint-Malo, France; Clay – $115,000 – 32S/11Q/13D; Singles – Doubles	(United States) Kaitlyn Christian (United States) Sabrina Santamaria; 7–6^{(7–4)}, 4–6, [10–5]	(United States) Hayley Carter (Brazil) Luisa Stefani	(France) Harmony Tan (Russia) Varvara Gracheva	(Spain) Aliona Bolsova (Belarus) Aliaksandra Sasnovich (Slovakia) Anna Karolína Schmiedlová (Sweden) Rebecca Peterson
June 7	Croatia Bol Open; Bol, Croatia; Clay – $115,000 – 32S/8Q/16D; Singles – Doubles	(Italy) Jasmine Paolini; 6–2, 7–6^{(7–4)}	(Netherlands) Arantxa Rus	(Russia) Anna Blinkova (Romania) Irina Bara	(Austria) Barbara Haas (Slovakia) Kristína Kučová (Italy) Martina Trevisan (United States) Claire Liu
June 7	Croatia Bol Open; Bol, Croatia; Clay – $115,000 – 32S/8Q/16D; Singles – Doubles	(Spain) Aliona Bolsova (Poland) Katarzyna Kawa; 6–1, 4–6, [10–6]	(Georgia (country)) Ekaterine Gorgodze (Slovakia) Tereza Mihalíková	(Russia) Anna Blinkova (Romania) Irina Bara	(Austria) Barbara Haas (Slovakia) Kristína Kučová (Italy) Martina Trevisan (United States) Claire Liu
July 5	Nordea Open; Båstad, Sweden; Clay – $115,000 – 32S/16D; Singles – Doubles	(Spain) Nuria Párrizas Díaz; 6–2, 6–2	(Belarus) Olga Govortsova	(Sweden) Rebecca Peterson (Romania) Mihaela Buzărnescu	(Spain) Aliona Bolsova (Egypt) Mayar Sherif (United States) Claire Liu (Hungary) Anna Bondár
July 5	Nordea Open; Båstad, Sweden; Clay – $115,000 – 32S/16D; Singles – Doubles	(Sweden) Mirjam Björklund (Switzerland) Leonie Küng; 5–7, 6–3, [10–5]	(Slovakia) Tereza Mihalíková (Russia) Kamilla Rakhimova	(Sweden) Rebecca Peterson (Romania) Mihaela Buzărnescu	(Spain) Aliona Bolsova (Egypt) Mayar Sherif (United States) Claire Liu (Hungary) Anna Bondár
July 26	LTP Women's Open; Charleston, United States $115,000 – Green Clay – 32S/10D; Singles – Doubles	(United States) Varvara Lepchenko; 7–6^{(7–4)}, 4–6, 6–4	(United States) Jamie Loeb	(Ukraine) Kateryna Bondarenko (United States) Lauren Davis	(Chinese Taipei) Liang En-shuo (United States) Emma Navarro (United States) Hanna Chang (United States) Maria Mateas
July 26	LTP Women's Open; Charleston, United States $115,000 – Green Clay – 32S/10D; Singles – Doubles	(Chinese Taipei) Liang En-shuo (Canada) Rebecca Marino; 5–7, 7–5, [10–7]	(New Zealand) Erin Routliffe (Indonesia) Aldila Sutjiadi	(Ukraine) Kateryna Bondarenko (United States) Lauren Davis	(Chinese Taipei) Liang En-shuo (United States) Emma Navarro (United States) Hanna Chang (United States) Maria Mateas
July 26	Belgrade Ladies Open; Belgrade, Serbia; Clay – $115,000 – 32S/8Q/11D; Singles – Doubles	(Slovakia) Anna Karolína Schmiedlová; 6–3, 6–3	(Netherlands) Arantxa Rus	(Slovakia) Rebecca Šramková (Germany) Andrea Petkovic	(Russia) Anna Blinkova (Czech Republic) Kristýna Plíšková (Croatia) Tara Würth (Italy) Martina Trevisan
July 26	Belgrade Ladies Open; Belgrade, Serbia; Clay – $115,000 – 32S/8Q/11D; Singles – Doubles	(Belarus) Olga Govortsova (Belarus) Lidziya Marozava; 6–2, 6–2	(Russia) Alena Fomina (Russia) Ekaterina Yashina	(Slovakia) Rebecca Šramková (Germany) Andrea Petkovic	(Russia) Anna Blinkova (Czech Republic) Kristýna Plíšková (Croatia) Tara Würth (Italy) Martina Trevisan
August 2	Thoreau Tennis Open; Concord, United States; Hard – $115,000 – 32S/16Q/16D; Singles – Doubles	(Poland) Magdalena Fręch; 6–3, 7–6^{(7–4)}	(Mexico) Renata Zarazúa	(Russia) Vera Zvonareva (United States) Madison Brengle	(United States) Katrina Scott (Georgia (country)) Mariam Bolkvadze (Spain) Cristina Bucșa (Chinese Taipei) Hsieh Su-wei
August 2	Thoreau Tennis Open; Concord, United States; Hard – $115,000 – 32S/16Q/16D; Singles – Doubles	(Thailand) Peangtarn Plipuech (Indonesia) Jessy Rompies; 3–6, 7–6^{(7–5)}, [10–8]	(United States) Usue Maitane Arconada (Spain) Cristina Bucșa	(Russia) Vera Zvonareva (United States) Madison Brengle	(United States) Katrina Scott (Georgia (country)) Mariam Bolkvadze (Spain) Cristina Bucșa (Chinese Taipei) Hsieh Su-wei
August 16	WTA Chicago 125; Chicago, United States; Hard – $115,000 – 32S/8Q/16D; Singles – Doubles	(Denmark) Clara Tauson; 6–1, 2–6, 6–4	(United Kingdom) Emma Raducanu	(United States) Claire Liu (United States) Ann Li	(Germany) Jule Niemeier (Russia) Vitalia Diatchenko (Kazakhstan) Zarina Diyas (Australia) Storm Sanders
August 16	WTA Chicago 125; Chicago, United States; Hard – $115,000 – 32S/8Q/16D; Singles – Doubles	(Japan) Eri Hozumi (Thailand) Peangtarn Plipuech; 7–5, 6–2	(Germany) Mona Barthel (Chinese Taipei) Hsieh Yu-chieh	(United States) Claire Liu (United States) Ann Li	(Germany) Jule Niemeier (Russia) Vitalia Diatchenko (Kazakhstan) Zarina Diyas (Australia) Storm Sanders
September 6	Liqui Moly Open; Karlsruhe, Germany; Clay – $115,000 – 32S/8Q/8D; Singles – Doubles	(Egypt) Mayar Sherif; 6–3, 6–2	(Italy) Martina Trevisan	(Romania) Jaqueline Cristian (Belgium) Maryna Zanevska	(Germany) Nastasja Schunk (Slovakia) Rebecca Šramková (Hungary) Dalma Gálfi (Hungary) Anna Bondár
September 6	Liqui Moly Open; Karlsruhe, Germany; Clay – $115,000 – 32S/8Q/8D; Singles – Doubles	(Romania) Irina Bara (Georgia (country)) Ekaterine Gorgodze; 6–3, 2–6, [10–7]	(Poland) Katarzyna Piter (Egypt) Mayar Sherif	(Romania) Jaqueline Cristian (Belgium) Maryna Zanevska	(Germany) Nastasja Schunk (Slovakia) Rebecca Šramková (Hungary) Dalma Gálfi (Hungary) Anna Bondár
September 20	WTA Columbus 125; Columbus, United States; Hard (i) – $115,000 – 32S/16Q/11D; Singles – Doubles	(Spain) Nuria Párrizas Díaz; 7–6^{(7–2)}, 6–3	(China) Wang Xinyu	(United States) CoCo Vandeweghe (China) Zheng Saisai	(United States) Ann Li (United States) Madison Brengle (United States) Lauren Davis (Brazil) Beatriz Haddad Maia
September 20	WTA Columbus 125; Columbus, United States; Hard (i) – $115,000 – 32S/16Q/11D; Singles – Doubles	(China) Wang Xinyu (China) Zheng Saisai; 6–1, 6–1	(Slovenia) Dalila Jakupović (Spain) Nuria Párrizas Díaz	(United States) CoCo Vandeweghe (China) Zheng Saisai	(United States) Ann Li (United States) Madison Brengle (United States) Lauren Davis (Brazil) Beatriz Haddad Maia
November 1	Dow Tennis Classic; Midland, United States; Hard (i) – $115,000 – 32S/16Q/14D; Singles – Doubles	(United States) Madison Brengle; 6–2, 6–4	(United States) Robin Anderson	(United States) Danielle Lao (United States) Caty McNally	(Australia) Lizette Cabrera (United States) Francesca Di Lorenzo (United States) Katrina Scott (Japan) Misaki Doi
November 1	Dow Tennis Classic; Midland, United States; Hard (i) – $115,000 – 32S/16Q/14D; Singles – Doubles	(United Kingdom) Harriet Dart (United States) Asia Muhammad; 6–3, 2–6, [10–7]	(Thailand) Peangtarn Plipuech (Indonesia) Aldila Sutjiadi	(United States) Danielle Lao (United States) Caty McNally	(Australia) Lizette Cabrera (United States) Francesca Di Lorenzo (United States) Katrina Scott (Japan) Misaki Doi
November 1	Argentina Open; Buenos Aires, Argentina; Clay – $115,000 – 32S/8Q/16D; Singles – Doubles	(Hungary) Anna Bondár; 6–3, 6–3	(France) Diane Parry	(Egypt) Mayar Sherif (Hungary) Panna Udvardy	(Georgia (country)) Ekaterine Gorgodze (Greece) Despina Papamichail (Romania) Irina Bara (Brazil) Beatriz Haddad Maia
November 1	Argentina Open; Buenos Aires, Argentina; Clay – $115,000 – 32S/8Q/16D; Singles – Doubles	(Romania) Irina Bara (Georgia (country)) Ekaterine Gorgodze; 5–7, 7–5, [10–4]	(Argentina) María Lourdes Carlé (Greece) Despina Papamichail	(Egypt) Mayar Sherif (Hungary) Panna Udvardy	(Georgia (country)) Ekaterine Gorgodze (Greece) Despina Papamichail (Romania) Irina Bara (Brazil) Beatriz Haddad Maia
November 15	Montevideo Open; Montevideo, Uruguay; Clay – $115,000 – 32S/8Q/12D; Singles – Doubles	(France) Diane Parry; 6–3, 6–2	(Hungary) Panna Udvardy	(Andorra) Victoria Jiménez Kasintseva (Georgia (country)) Ekaterine Gorgodze	(Colombia) Emiliana Arango (Brazil) Laura Pigossi (China) You Xiaodi (Spain) Ane Mintegi del Olmo
November 15	Montevideo Open; Montevideo, Uruguay; Clay – $115,000 – 32S/8Q/12D; Singles – Doubles	(Romania) Irina Bara (Georgia (country)) Ekaterine Gorgodze; 6–4, 6–3	(Brazil) Carolina Alves (Spain) Marina Bassols Ribera	(Andorra) Victoria Jiménez Kasintseva (Georgia (country)) Ekaterine Gorgodze	(Colombia) Emiliana Arango (Brazil) Laura Pigossi (China) You Xiaodi (Spain) Ane Mintegi del Olmo
December 6	Open Angers Arena Loire; Angers, France; Hard (i) – $115,000 – 32S/16Q/8D; Singles – Doubles	(Russia) Vitalia Diatchenko; 6–0, 6–4	(China) Zhang Shuai	(Russia) Natalia Vikhlyantseva (China) Yuan Yue	(France) Mallaurie Noël (France) Clara Burel (Croatia) Jana Fett (France) Kristina Mladenovic
December 6	Open Angers Arena Loire; Angers, France; Hard (i) – $115,000 – 32S/16Q/8D; Singles – Doubles	(Slovakia) Tereza Mihalíková (Belgium) Greet Minnen; 4–6, 6–1, [10–8]	(Romania) Monica Niculescu (Russia) Vera Zvonareva	(Russia) Natalia Vikhlyantseva (China) Yuan Yue	(France) Mallaurie Noël (France) Clara Burel (Croatia) Jana Fett (France) Kristina Mladenovic
December 13	Open BLS de Limoges; Limoges, France; Hard (i) – $115,000 – 32S/8Q/8D; Singles – Doubles	(Belgium) Alison Van Uytvanck; 6–2, 7–5	(Romania) Ana Bogdan	(Russia) Varvara Gracheva (Russia) Vera Zvonareva	(France) Jessika Ponchet (Belgium) Greet Minnen (France) Caroline Garcia (France) Kristina Mladenovic
December 13	Open BLS de Limoges; Limoges, France; Hard (i) – $115,000 – 32S/8Q/8D; Singles – Doubles	(Romania) Monica Niculescu (Russia) Vera Zvonareva; 6–4, 6–4	(France) Estelle Cascino (France) Jessika Ponchet	(Russia) Varvara Gracheva (Russia) Vera Zvonareva	(France) Jessika Ponchet (Belgium) Greet Minnen (France) Caroline Garcia (France) Kristina Mladenovic
December 20	Hana Bank Korea Open; Seoul, South Korea; Hard (i) – $115,000 – 28S/8D; Singles – Doubles	(China) Zhu Lin; 6–0, 6–4	(France) Kristina Mladenovic	(Russia) Ekaterina Kazionova (Finland) Anastasia Kulikova	(Japan) Yuki Naito (Czech Republic) Linda Fruhvirtová (Netherlands) Arianne Hartono (Bulgaria) Isabella Shinikova
December 20	Hana Bank Korea Open; Seoul, South Korea; Hard (i) – $115,000 – 28S/8D; Singles – Doubles	(South Korea) Choi Ji-hee (South Korea) Han Na-lae; 6–4, 6–4	(Greece) Valentini Grammatikopoulou (Hungary) Réka Luca Jani	(Russia) Ekaterina Kazionova (Finland) Anastasia Kulikova	(Japan) Yuki Naito (Czech Republic) Linda Fruhvirtová (Netherlands) Arianne Hartono (Bulgaria) Isabella Shinikova

== Statistical information ==
These tables present the number of singles (S) and doubles (D) titles won by each player and each nation during the season. The players/nations are sorted by: 1) total number of titles (a doubles title won by two players representing the same nation counts as only one win for the nation); 2) a singles > doubles hierarchy; 3) alphabetical order (by family names for players).

To avoid confusion and double counting, these tables should be updated only after an event is completed.

=== Titles won by player ===
Total	Player	S	D	S	D
3	Irina Bara (ROU)		● ● ●	0	3
3	Ekaterine Gorgodze (GEO)		● ● ●	0	3
2	Nuria Párrizas Díaz (ESP)	● ●		2	0
2	Peangtarn Plipuech (THA)		● ●	0	2
1	Anna Bondár (HUN)	●		1	0
1	Madison Brengle (USA)	●		1	0
1	Vitalia Diatchenko (RUS)	●		1	0
1	Magdalena Fręch (POL)	●		1	0
1	Viktorija Golubic (SUI)	●		1	0
1	Varvara Lepchenko (USA)	●		1	0
1	Jasmine Paolini (ITA)	●		1	0
1	Diane Parry (FRA)	●		1	0
1	Anna Karolína Schmiedlová (SVK)	●		1	0
1	Mayar Sherif (EGY)	●		1	0
1	Clara Tauson (DEN)	●		1	0
1	Alison Van Uytvanck (BEL)	●		1	0
1	Zhu Lin (CHN)	●		1	0
1	Mirjam Björklund (SWE)		●	0	1
1	Aliona Bolsova (ESP)		●	0	1
1	Choi Ji-hee (KOR)		●	0	1
1	Kaitlyn Christian (USA)		●	0	1
1	Harriet Dart (GBR)		●	0	1
1	Olga Govortsova (BLR)		●	0	1
1	Han Na-lae (KOR)		●	0	1
1	Eri Hozumi (JPN)		●	0	1
1	Katarzyna Kawa (POL)		●	0	1
1	Leonie Küng (SUI)		●	0	1
1	Liang En-shuo (TPE)		●	0	1
1	Rebecca Marino (CAN)		●	0	1
1	Lidziya Marozava (BLR)		●	0	1
1	Tereza Mihalíková (SVK)		●	0	1
1	Greet Minnen (BEL)		●	0	1
1	Asia Muhammad (USA)		●	0	1
1	Monica Niculescu (ROU)		●	0	1
1	Jessy Rompies (INA)		●	0	1
1	Sabrina Santamaria (USA)		●	0	1
1	Wang Xinyu (CHN)		●	0	1
1	Zheng Saisai (CHN)		●	0	1
1	Vera Zvonareva (RUS)		●	0	1

=== Titles won by nation ===
Total	Nation	S	D
4	United States (USA)	2	2
4	Romania (ROU)	0	4
3	Spain (ESP)	2	1
3	Georgia (GEO)	0	3
2	Belgium (BEL)	1	1
2	China (CHN)	1	1
2	Poland (POL)	1	1
2	Russia (RUS)	1	1
2	Slovakia (SVK)	1	1
2	Switzerland (SUI)	1	1
2	Thailand (THA)	0	2
1	Denmark (DEN)	1	0
1	Egypt (EGY)	1	0
1	France (FRA)	1	0
1	Hungary (HUN)	1	0
1	Italy (ITA)	1	0
1	Belarus (BLR)	0	1
1	Canada (CAN)	0	1
1	Chinese Taipei (TPE)	0	1
1	Great Britain (GBR)	0	1
1	Indonesia (INA)	0	1
1	Japan (JPN)	0	1
1	South Korea (KOR)	0	1
1	Sweden (SWE)	0	1

== Points distribution ==
Event	W	F	SF	QF	R16	R32	Q	Q2	Q1
Singles	160	95	57	29	15	1	6	4	1
Doubles (16D)	160	95	57	29	1	—N/a	—N/a	—N/a	—N/a
Doubles (8D)	160	95	57	1	—N/a	—N/a	—N/a	—N/a	—N/a

== See also ==
- 2021 WTA Tour
- 2021 ITF Women's World Tennis Tour
- 2021 ATP Challenger Tour
