= 2019 Korea Open =

2019 Korea Open may refer to:

- 2019 Korea Open (badminton)
- 2019 Korea Open (tennis)
- 2019 Korea Open – Singles
- 2019 Korea Open – Doubles
