= 2023 Korea Open – Singles =

Singles
- 2023 Korea Open

Final
- Champion: (United States) Jessica Pegula
- Runner-up: (China) Yuan Yue
- Score: 6–2, 6–3

Details
- Draw: 32
- Seeds: 8

Events
Singles	Doubles
← 2022 ·	Korea Open	· 2024 →

Jessica Pegula defeated Yuan Yue in the final, 6–2, 6–3 to win the singles tennis title at the 2023 Korea Open. Yuan was contesting her first WTA Tour final.

Ekaterina Alexandrova was the defending champion, but lost to Yanina Wickmayer in the second round.

== Seeds ==
1. (United States) Jessica Pegula (champion)
2. (Latvia) Jeļena Ostapenko (first round)
3. Ekaterina Alexandrova (second round)
4. (Czech Republic) Marie Bouzková (quarterfinals)
5. (United States) Sofia Kenin (first round)
6. (United States) Alycia Parks (first round)
7. (Netherlands) Arantxa Rus (second round, retired)
8. (United Kingdom) Katie Boulter (first round)

== Draw ==
=== Key ===
- Q = Qualifier
- WC = Wild card
- LL = Lucky loser
- Alt = Alternate
- SE = Special exempt
- PR = Protected ranking
- ITF = ITF entry
- JE = Junior exempt
- w/o = Walkover
- r = Retired
- d = Defaulted
- SR = Special ranking

=== Finals ===
Semifinals
1/WC	(United States) Jessica Pegula	6	6
(Belgium) Yanina Wickmayer	4	3
(China) Yuan Yue	6^{3}	6	6
(United States) Emina Bektas	7^{7}	4	2

Final
1/WC	(United States) Jessica Pegula	6	6
(China) Yuan Yue	2	3

=== Top half ===
First round
1/WC	(United States) J Pegula	6	6
(Slovakia) V Hrunčáková	2	4
(Argentina) N Podoroska	2	4
(United States) A Krueger	6	6
(United States) C Liu	6	6
Q	(South Korea) Y-w Ku	3	3
WC	(South Korea) N-l Han	1	3
7	(Netherlands) A Rus	6	6
3	E Alexandrova	6	6
(Japan) M Hontama	3	1
Q	(Chinese Taipei) E-s Liang	3	4
(Belgium) Y Wickmayer	6	6
(Liechtenstein) K von Deichmann	5	6	3
LL	I Khromacheva	7	4	0^{r}
P Kudermetova	3	6	6
6	(United States) A Parks	6	1	0

Second round
1/WC	(United States) J Pegula	6	6
(United States) A Krueger	3	1
(United States) C Liu	1	6	3
7	(Netherlands) A Rus	6	3	0^{r}
3	E Alexandrova	3	6^{6}
(Belgium) Y Wickmayer	6	7^{8}
(Liechtenstein) K von Deichmann	3	1
P Kudermetova	6	6

Quarterfinals
1/WC	(United States) J Pegula	4	6	6
(United States) C Liu	6	3	0
(Belgium) Y Wickmayer	6	6
P Kudermetova	3	1

Semifinals
1/WC	(United States) J Pegula	6	6
(Belgium) Y Wickmayer	4	3

=== Bottom half ===
First round
8	(United Kingdom) K Boulter	4	4
(Slovenia) K Juvan	6	6
Q	(Netherlands) A Hartono	1	2
(China) Y Yuan	6	6
(Germany) E Lys	6	6
(Slovakia) AK Schmiedlová	2	4
(United States) K Day	4	4
4	(Czech Republic) M Bouzková	6	6
5	(United States) S Kenin	1	4
(South Korea) S-j Jang	6	6
(Brazil) L Pigossi	7^{7}	4	5
(United States) E Bektas	6^{5}	6	7
Q	(United States) S Vickery	4	4
(Australia) K Birrell	6	6
WC	(South Korea) D-y Back	3	6	7^{7}
2	(Latvia) J Ostapenko	6	1	6^{4}

Second round
(Slovenia) K Juvan	4	1^{r}
(China) Y Yuan	6	4
(Germany) E Lys	1	0^{r}
4	(Czech Republic) M Bouzková	6	0
(South Korea) S-j Jang	3	4
(United States) E Bektas	6	6
(Australia) K Birrell	6	6
WC	(South Korea) D-y Back	0	1

Quarterfinals
(China) Y Yuan	7	7^{9}
4	(Czech Republic) M Bouzková	5	6^{7}
(United States) E Bektas	4	6	6
(Australia) K Birrell	6	3	2

Semifinals
(China) Y Yuan	6^{3}	6	6
(United States) E Bektas	7^{7}	4	2

== Qualifying ==
=== Seeds ===
1. (United States) Sachia Vickery (qualified)
2. (Netherlands) Arianne Hartono (qualified)
3. (Chinese Taipei) Liang En-shuo (qualified)
4. (South Korea) Park So-hyun (first round, retired)
5. Irina Khromacheva (qualifying competition, lucky loser)
6. (Chinese Taipei) Lee Ya-hsuan (qualifying competition)
7. Ksenia Zaytseva (qualifying competition)
8. (Thailand) Peangtarn Plipuech (first round)

=== Qualifiers ===
1. (United States) Sachia Vickery
2. (Netherlands) Arianne Hartono
3. (Chinese Taipei) Liang En-shuo
4. (South Korea) Ku Yeon-woo

=== Lucky loser ===
1. Irina Khromacheva

=== Qualifying draw ===
==== First qualifier ====
First round
1	(United States) Sachia Vickery	6	6
WC	(South Korea) Jeong Bo-young	2	3
(United States) Bethanie Mattek-Sands	6	5	4
7	Ksenia Zaytseva	2	7	6

Qualifying competition
1	(United States) Sachia Vickery	7^{12}	2	6
7	Ksenia Zaytseva	6^{10}	6	2

==== Second qualifier ====
First round
2	(Netherlands) Arianne Hartono	6	6
(Japan) Eri Hozumi	2	4
(South Korea) Kim Da-bin	2	3
5	Irina Khromacheva	6	6

Qualifying competition
2	(Netherlands) Arianne Hartono	7	6
5	Irina Khromacheva	5	4

==== Third qualifier ====
First round
3	(Chinese Taipei) Liang En-shuo	6	3	7^{7}
(Thailand) Luksika Kumkhum	2	6	6^{5}
(Japan) Mei Yamaguchi	6	6
8	(Thailand) Peangtarn Plipuech	4	3

Qualifying competition
3	(Chinese Taipei) Liang En-shuo	6	6
(Japan) Mei Yamaguchi	1	2

==== Fourth qualifier ====
First round
4	(South Korea) Park So-hyun	6^{2}	1^{r}
WC	(South Korea) Ku Yeon-woo	7^{7}	4
(United States) Quinn Gleason	6	6^{3}	4
6	(Chinese Taipei) Lee Ya-hsuan	2	7^{7}	6

Qualifying competition
WC	(South Korea) Ku Yeon-woo	6	3	6
6	(Chinese Taipei) Lee Ya-hsuan	1	6	4
