= 2022 Korea Open – Men's singles =

Men's singles
- 2022 Korea Open

Final
- Champion: (Japan) Yoshihito Nishioka
- Runner-up: (Canada) Denis Shapovalov
- Score: 6–4, 7–6^{(7–5)}

Details
- Draw: 28
- Seeds: 8

Events
Singles	men	women
Doubles	men	women
Korea Open	· 2023 →

Yoshihito Nishioka defeated Denis Shapovalov in the final, 6–4, 7–6^{(7–5)} to win the men's singles tennis title at the 2022 Korea Open. It was his first ATP Tour title since Shenzhen in 2018.

This was the first edition of an ATP Tour event in Seoul since 1996.

== Seeds ==
The top four seeds received a bye into the second round.

1. (Norway) Casper Ruud (quarterfinals)
2. (United Kingdom) Cameron Norrie (quarterfinals, withdrew)
3. (United States) Taylor Fritz (withdrew)
4. (Canada) Denis Shapovalov (final)
5. (United Kingdom) Dan Evans (first round)
6. (Croatia) Borna Ćorić (withdrew)
7. (Serbia) Miomir Kecmanović (first round)
8. (United States) Jenson Brooksby (semifinals)

== Draw ==
=== Key ===
- Q = Qualifier
- WC = Wild card
- LL = Lucky loser
- Alt = Alternate
- SE = Special exempt
- PR = Protected ranking
- ITF = ITF entry
- JE = Junior exempt
- w/o = Walkover
- r = Retired
- d = Defaulted
- SR = Special ranking

=== Finals ===
Semifinals
(Japan) Yoshihito Nishioka	6	4	6
LL	(United States) Aleksandar Kovacevic	3	6	3
4	(Canada) Denis Shapovalov	7	6
8	(United States) Jenson Brooksby	5	4

Final
(Japan) Yoshihito Nishioka	6	7^{7}
4	(Canada) Denis Shapovalov	4	6^{5}

=== Top half ===
First round
Q	(Chile) N Jarry	6	7^{10}
LL	(United Kingdom) R Peniston	3	6^{8}
(Japan) T Daniel	6	6
(Ecuador) E Gómez	4	4
(Japan) Y Nishioka	6	7^{7}
5	(United Kingdom) D Evans	2	6^{3}
(United States) M McDonald	7	6
(Spain) P Martínez	5	4
(Chinese Taipei) C-h Tseng	6	0
(Australia) C O'Connell	4	0^{r}
LL	(United States) A Kovacevic	6	6
7	(Serbia) M Kecmanović	4	4

Second round
1	(Norway) C Ruud	6	3	6
Q	(Chile) N Jarry	2	6	3
(Japan) T Daniel	2	4
(Japan) Y Nishioka	6	6
LL	(Japan) S Mochizuki	3	4
(United States) M McDonald	6	6
(Chinese Taipei) C-h Tseng	6^{5}	7^{7}	2
LL	(United States) A Kovacevic	7^{7}	6^{4}	6

Quarterfinals
1	(Norway) C Ruud	2	6	2
(Japan) Y Nishioka	6	3	6
(United States) M McDonald	6	3	2
LL	(United States) A Kovacevic	4	6	6

Semifinals
(Japan) Y Nishioka	6	4	6
LL	(United States) A Kovacevic	3	6	3

=== Bottom half ===
First round
LL	(Japan) H Moriya	3	4
(Moldova) R Albot	6	6
(United States) S Johnson	7^{7}	6
WC	(South Korea) J-s Nam	6^{3}	4
Q	(Japan) Y Watanuki	1^{r}
(Spain) J Munar	2
8	(United States) J Brooksby	7^{7}	3	6
Q	(Chinese Taipei) T-l Wu	6^{5}	6	0
(South Korea) S-w Kwon	7^{7}	6^{3}	6
Q	(South Korea) Y-s Chung	6^{5}	7^{7}	1
WC	(South Korea) S-c Hong	4	2
WC	(Japan) K Uchida	6	6

Second round
(Moldova) R Albot	7^{7}	7^{7}
(United States) S Johnson	6^{3}	6^{3}
(Spain) J Munar	5	4
4	(Canada) D Shapovalov	7	6
8	(United States) J Brooksby	6	6
(South Korea) S-w Kwon	3	4
WC	(Japan) K Uchida	2	2
2	(United Kingdom) C Norrie	6	6

Quarterfinals
(Moldova) R Albot	2	2
4	(Canada) D Shapovalov	6	6
8	(United States) J Brooksby	w/o
2	(United Kingdom) C Norrie

Semifinals
4	(Canada) D Shapovalov	7	6
8	(United States) J Brooksby	5	4

== Qualifying ==
=== Seeds ===
1. (Chile) Nicolás Jarry (qualified)
2. (Sweden) Elias Ymer (first round)
3. (United Kingdom) Ryan Peniston (qualifying competition, lucky loser)
4. (Japan) Kaichi Uchida (received wildcard into main draw)
5. (Chinese Taipei) Wu Tung-lin (qualified)
6. (Czech Republic) Dalibor Svrčina (first round)
7. (United States) Aleksandar Kovacevic (qualifying competition, lucky loser)
8. (Japan) Yosuke Watanuki (qualified)

=== Qualifiers ===
1. (Chile) Nicolás Jarry
2. (South Korea) Chung Yun-seong
3. (Chinese Taipei) Wu Tung-lin
4. (Japan) Yosuke Watanuki

=== Lucky losers ===
1. (United States) Aleksandar Kovacevic
2. (United Kingdom) Ryan Peniston
3. (Japan) Hiroki Moriya
4. (Japan) Shintaro Mochizuki

=== Qualifying draw ===
==== First qualifier ====
First round
1	(Chile) Nicolás Jarry	6	6
PR	(Japan) Tatsuma Ito	2	1
(Japan) Sho Shimabukuro	7^{7}	3	2
7	(United States) Aleksandar Kovacevic	6^{3}	6	6

Qualifying competition
1	(Chile) Nicolás Jarry	7^{8}	6
7	(United States) Aleksandar Kovacevic	6^{6}	3

==== Second qualifier ====
First round
2	(Sweden) Elias Ymer	6	4	3
(Japan) Shintaro Mochizuki	1	6	6
(South Korea) Chung Yun-seong	6	4	6
6	(Czech Republic) Dalibor Svrčina	3	6	1

Qualifying competition
(Japan) Shintaro Mochizuki	5	4
(South Korea) Chung Yun-seong	7	6

==== Third qualifier ====
First round
3	(United Kingdom) Ryan Peniston	7	6
WC	(South Korea) Lee Jea-moon	5	3
WC	(South Korea) Lee Duck-hee	6	4	5
5	(Chinese Taipei) Wu Tung-lin	4	6	7

Qualifying competition
3	(United Kingdom) Ryan Peniston	5	2
5	(Chinese Taipei) Wu Tung-lin	7	6

==== Fourth qualifier ====
First round
Alt	(Philippines) Treat Huey	4	1
(Japan) Hiroki Moriya	6	6
Alt	(Australia) John-Patrick Smith	3	1
8	(Japan) Yosuke Watanuki	6	6

Qualifying competition
(Japan) Hiroki Moriya	6	6^{3}	2
8	(Japan) Yosuke Watanuki	3	7^{7}	6
