= 2022 Korea Open – Women's doubles =

Women's doubles
- 2022 Korea Open

Final
- Champions: (France) Kristina Mladenovic (Belgium) Yanina Wickmayer
- Runners-up: (United States) Asia Muhammad (United States) Sabrina Santamaria
- Score: 6–3, 6–2

Details
- Draw: 16
- Seeds: 4

Events
Singles	men	women
Doubles	men	women
← 2021 ·	Korea Open	· 2023 →

Kristina Mladenovic and Yanina Wickmayer defeated Asia Muhammad and Sabrina Santamaria in the final, 6–3, 6–2 to win the women's doubles tennis title at the 2022 Korea Open.

Choi Ji-hee and Han Na-lae were the defending champions from when the event was a WTA 125 tournament, but chose to compete with different partners this year. Choi partnered Park So-hyun, but lost in the first round to Ekaterina Alexandrova and Yana Sizikova. Han partnered Jang Su-jeong, but lost in the semifinals to Muhammad and Santamaria.

== Seeds ==
1. (United States) Asia Muhammad / (United States) Sabrina Santamaria (final)
2. (United States) Kaitlyn Christian / Lidziya Marozava (first round)
3. Ekaterina Alexandrova / Yana Sizikova (semifinals)
4. (Georgia (country)) Oksana Kalashnikova / (Ukraine) Nadiia Kichenok (quarterfinals)

== Draw ==
=== Key ===
- Q = Qualifier
- WC = Wild card
- LL = Lucky loser
- Alt = Alternate
- SE = Special exempt
- PR = Protected ranking
- ITF = ITF entry
- JE = Junior exempt
- w/o = Walkover
- r = Retired
- d = Defaulted
- SR = Special ranking

=== Draw ===
First round
1	(United States) A Muhammad (United States) S Santamaria	7	7
WC	(South Korea) D-b Kim (South Korea) Y-w Ku	5	5
(Thailand) P Plipuech (India) A Raina	3	3
(Australia) A Sharma (Netherlands) R van der Hoek	6	6
4	(Georgia (country)) O Kalashnikova (Ukraine) N Kichenok	7	6
(Netherlands) A Hartono (Australia) O Tjandramulia	5	2
(South Korea) N-l Han (South Korea) S-j Jang	6	6
(China) X Han (Chinese Taipei) E-s Liang	3	3
(Indonesia) J Rompies (Japan) M Uchijima	6	2	[8]
PR	(Australia) K Birrell (Australia) M Inglis	3	6	[10]
WC	(South Korea) J-h Choi (South Korea) S-h Park	7^{7}	5	[7]
3	E Alexandrova; Y Sizikova	6^{2}	7	[10]
PR	(France) K Mladenovic (Belgium) Y Wickmayer	5	7^{7}	[11]
(Australia) L Cabrera (Greece) V Grammatikopoulou	7	6^{3}	[9]
A Blinkova (Georgia (country)) N Dzalamidze	6	6
2	(United States) K Christian; L Marozava	2	4

Quarterfinals
1	(United States) A Muhammad (United States) S Santamaria	6	5
(Australia) A Sharma (Netherlands) R van der Hoek	4	3^{r}
4	(Georgia (country)) O Kalashnikova (Ukraine) N Kichenok	1	3
(South Korea) N-l Han (South Korea) S-j Jang	6	6
PR	(Australia) K Birrell (Australia) M Inglis	1	4
3	E Alexandrova; Y Sizikova	6	6
PR	(France) K Mladenovic (Belgium) Y Wickmayer	6	6
A Blinkova (Georgia (country)) N Dzalamidze	1	3

Semifinals
1	(United States) A Muhammad (United States) S Santamaria	6	5	[12]
(South Korea) N-l Han (South Korea) S-j Jang	3	7	[10]
3	E Alexandrova; Y Sizikova	5	3
PR	(France) K Mladenovic (Belgium) Y Wickmayer	7	6

Final
1	(United States) A Muhammad (United States) S Santamaria	3	2
PR	(France) K Mladenovic (Belgium) Y Wickmayer	6	6
