= 2022 Korea Open – Men's doubles =

Men's doubles
- 2022 Korea Open

Final
- Champions: (South Africa) Raven Klaasen (United States) Nathaniel Lammons
- Runners-up: (Colombia) Nicolás Barrientos (Mexico) Miguel Ángel Reyes-Varela
- Score: 6–1, 7–5

Details
- Draw: 16
- Seeds: 4

Events
Singles	men	women
Doubles	men	women
Korea Open	· 2023 →

Raven Klaasen and Nathaniel Lammons defeated Nicolás Barrientos and Miguel Ángel Reyes-Varela in the final, 6–1, 7–5 to win the men's doubles tennis title at the 2022 Korea Open.

This was the first edition of an ATP Tour event in Seoul since 1996.

This was 2017 Next Generation ATP Finals champion and 2018 Australian Open semifinalist Chung Hyeon's first ATP tour event since the 2020 French Open qualifying event. Partnering compatriot Kwon Soon-woo, he reached the semifinals.

== Seeds ==
1. (South Africa) Raven Klaasen / (United States) Nathaniel Lammons (champions)
2. (Colombia) Nicolás Barrientos / (Mexico) Miguel Ángel Reyes-Varela (final)
3. (Ecuador) Diego Hidalgo / (Colombia) Cristian Rodríguez (quarterfinals)
4. (Sweden) André Göransson / (Japan) Ben McLachlan (quarterfinals)

== Draw ==
=== Key ===
- Q = Qualifier
- WC = Wild card
- LL = Lucky loser
- Alt = Alternate
- SE = Special exempt
- PR = Protected ranking
- ITF = ITF entry
- JE = Junior exempt
- w/o = Walkover
- r = Retired
- d = Defaulted
- SR = Special ranking

=== Draw ===
First round
1	(South Africa) R Klaasen (United States) N Lammons	7^{7}	6
(Spain) P Martínez (Spain) J Munar	6^{4}	1
(Belgium) S Gillé (Belgium) J Vliegen	6^{3}	7^{7}	[10]
(United States) M Schnur (Australia) J-P Smith	7^{7}	6^{3}	[7]
3	(Ecuador) D Hidalgo (Colombia) C Rodríguez	6	6
(Serbia) M Kecmanović (Australia) J Peers	2	1
(India) Y Bhambri (India) S Myneni	4	7^{7}	[10]
(France) J Eysseric (New Zealand) A Sitak	6	6^{5}	[6]
WC	(South Korea) H Chung (South Korea) S-w Kwon	2	6	[10]
(Mexico) H Hach Verdugo (Philippines) T Huey	6	2	[8]
Alt	(Moldova) R Albot (Chinese Taipei) C-h Tseng	4	6	[10]
4	(Sweden) A Göransson (Japan) B McLachlan	6	1	[12]
(United States) R Galloway (United States) A Lawson	6	3	[9]
WC	(South Korea) J-s Nam (South Korea) M-k Song	3	6	[11]
(Brazil) M Demoliner (Brazil) M Melo	6	5	[6]
2	(Colombia) N Barrientos (Mexico) MÁ Reyes-Varela	3	7	[10]

Quarterfinals
1	(South Africa) R Klaasen (United States) N Lammons	7^{7}	6^{4}	[10]
(Belgium) S Gillé (Belgium) J Vliegen	6^{3}	7^{7}	[7]
3	(Ecuador) D Hidalgo (Colombia) C Rodríguez	3	4
(India) Y Bhambri (India) S Myneni	6	6
WC	(South Korea) H Chung (South Korea) S-w Kwon	7^{7}	2	[10]
4	(Sweden) A Göransson (Japan) B McLachlan	6^{4}	6	[7]
WC	(South Korea) J-s Nam (South Korea) M-k Song	5	6	[7]
2	(Colombia) N Barrientos (Mexico) MÁ Reyes-Varela	7	3	[10]

Semifinals
1	(South Africa) R Klaasen (United States) N Lammons	7	7
(India) Y Bhambri (India) S Myneni	5	5
WC	(South Korea) H Chung (South Korea) S-w Kwon	3	3
2	(Colombia) N Barrientos (Mexico) MÁ Reyes-Varela	6	6

Final
1	(South Africa) R Klaasen (United States) N Lammons	6	7
2	(Colombia) N Barrientos (Mexico) MÁ Reyes-Varela	1	5
