= 2021 Karlsruhe Open =

- Date: 7 – 12 September
- Edition: 2nd
- Category: WTA 125K series
- Draw: 32S / 8D
- Prize money: $115,000
- Surface: Clay
- Location: Karlsruhe, Germany
- Venue: TC Rüppurr

Champions

Singles
- (Egypt) Mayar Sherif

Doubles
- (Romania) Irina Bara / (Georgia (country)) Ekaterine Gorgodze
← 2019 ·	Karlsruhe Open	· 2022 →

The 2021 Karlsruhe Open (also known as the Liqui Moly Open for sponsorship reasons) was a professional tennis tournament played on outdoor clay courts. It was the 2nd edition of the tournament and part of the 2021 WTA 125K series, offering a total of $115,000 in prize money. It took place in Karlsruhe, Germany between 7 and 12 September 2021. The tournament did not take place in 2020 due to the COVID-19 pandemic.

== Champions ==
=== Singles ===
- (Egypt) Mayar Sherif def. (Italy) Martina Trevisan, 6–3, 6–2

=== Doubles ===
- (Romania) Irina Bara / (Georgia (country)) Ekaterine Gorgodze def. (Poland) Katarzyna Piter / (Egypt) Mayar Sherif, 6–3, 2–6, [10–7]

== Singles main draw entrants ==
=== Seeds ===
Country	Player	Rank^{1}	Seed
FRA	Clara Burel	92	1
SVK	Anna Karolína Schmiedlová	93	2
EGY	Mayar Sherif	96	3
ITA	Martina Trevisan	106	4
SLO	Kaja Juvan	109	5
BEL	Maryna Zanevska	113	6
AUS	Astra Sharma	114	7
ROU	Irina Bara	118	8

- ^{1} Rankings as of 30 August 2021.

=== Other entrants ===
The following players received a wildcard into the singles main draw:

- (Germany) Sina Herrmann
- (Germany) Tatjana Maria
- (Germany) Nastasja Schunk
- (Germany) Alexandra Vecic

The following players qualified into the singles main draw:

- (Italy) Giulia Gatto-Monticone
- (Germany) Katharina Hobgarski
- (Germany) Yana Morderger
- (Croatia) Tereza Mrdeža

=== Withdrawals ===
Before the tournament

- (Romania) Ana Bogdan → replaced by (Australia) Maddison Inglis
- (Italy) Elisabetta Cocciaretto → replaced by (Romania) Jaqueline Cristian
- (Russia) Varvara Gracheva → replaced by (Argentina) Paula Ormaechea
- (Slovenia) Polona Hercog → replaced by (Georgia (country)) Ekaterine Gorgodze
- (Slovakia) Kristína Kučová → replaced by (Slovakia) Rebecca Šramková
- (United States) Varvara Lepchenko → replaced by (United States) Grace Min
- (Italy) Jasmine Paolini → replaced by (Italy) Lucia Bronzetti
- (Spain) Nuria Párrizas Díaz → replaced by (Ukraine) Katarina Zavatska
- (Czech Republic) Kristýna Plíšková → replaced by (Germany) Tamara Korpatsch
- (Netherlands) Arantxa Rus → replaced by (Russia) Anastasia Gasanova
- (Romania) Elena-Gabriela Ruse → replaced by (Hungary) Dalma Gálfi
- (Bulgaria) Viktoriya Tomova → replaced by (Spain) Cristina Bucșa
- (China) Zhang Shuai → replaced by (Poland) Katarzyna Kawa

== Doubles entrants ==
=== Seeds ===
Country	Player	Country	Player	Rank^{1}	Seed
AUS	Astra Sharma	NED	Rosalie van der Hoek	218	1
GER	Vivian Heisen	BEL	Kimberley Zimmermann	232	2
POL	Katarzyna Piter	EGY	Mayar Sherif	271	3
ROU	Irina Bara	GEO	Ekaterine Gorgodze	286	4

- ^{1} Rankings as of 30 August 2021.

=== Other entrants ===
The following pair received a wildcard into the doubles main draw:

- (Germany) Nastasja Schunk / (Germany) Alexandra Vecic
