= 2021 Karlsruhe Open – Singles =

Singles
- 2021 Karlsruhe Open

Final
- Champion: (Egypt) Mayar Sherif
- Runner-up: (Italy) Martina Trevisan
- Score: 6–3, 6–2

Events
Singles	Doubles
← 2019 ·	Karlsruhe Open	· 2022 →

The 2021 Karlsruhe Open (also known as the Liqui Moly Open for sponsorship reasons) was a professional tennis tournament played on outdoor clay courts. It was the 2nd edition of the tournament and part of the 2021 WTA 125K series, offering a total of $125,000 in prize money. It took place in Karlsruhe, Germany between 7 and 12 September 2021. The tournament did not take place in 2020 due to the COVID-19 pandemic. The singles part of the tournament had 32 competitors. Patricia Maria Țig was the defending champion, having won the previous edition in 2019, but chose not to participate. Mayar Sherif won the title, defeating Martina Trevisan in the final, 6–3, 6–2.

== Seeds ==
1. (France) Clara Burel (first round)
2. (Slovakia) Anna Karolína Schmiedlová (first round)
3. (Egypt) Mayar Sherif (champion)
4. (Italy) Martina Trevisan (final)
5. (Slovenia) Kaja Juvan (first round)
6. (Belgium) Maryna Zanevska (semifinals)
7. (Australia) Astra Sharma (second round)
8. (Romania) Irina Bara (second round)

== Draw ==
=== Key ===
- Q = Qualifier
- WC = Wild card
- LL = Lucky loser
- Alt = Alternate
- SE = Special exempt
- PR = Protected ranking
- ITF = ITF entry
- JE = Junior exempt
- w/o = Walkover
- r = Retired
- d = Defaulted
- SR = Special ranking

=== Finals ===
Semifinals
(Romania) Jaqueline Cristian	6^{3}	6	4
3	(Egypt) Mayar Sherif	7^{7}	4	6
4	(Italy) Martina Trevisan	6	4	6
6	(Belgium) Maryna Zanevska	3	6	4

Final
3	(Egypt) Mayar Sherif	6	6
4	(Italy) Martina Trevisan	3	2

=== Top half ===
First round
1	(France) C Burel	7^{9}	3	2
(Romania) J Cristian	6^{7}	6	6
(Italy) L Bronzetti	6	3	6
(Hungary) RL Jani	4	6	1
WC	(Germany) N Schunk	6	3	7
Q	(Germany) K Hobgarski	0	6	5
Q	(Germany) Y Morderger	1	2
7	(Australia) A Sharma	6	6
3	(Egypt) M Sherif	6	6
WC	(Germany) S Herrmann	0	2
(Australia) M Inglis	1^{r}
(Poland) K Kawa	2
WC	(Germany) T Maria	7	2	4
(Ukraine) K Zavatska	5	6	6
(Slovakia) R Šramková	6	6
5	(Slovenia) K Juvan	4	1

Second round
(Romania) J Cristian	6	7^{7}
(Italy) L Bronzetti	1	6^{2}
WC	(Germany) N Schunk	6	6
7	(Australia) A Sharma	2	4
3	(Egypt) M Sherif	6	6
(Poland) K Kawa	3	4
(Ukraine) K Zavatska	7	2	4
(Slovakia) R Šramková	5	6	6

Quarterfinals
(Romania) J Cristian	6	6
WC	(Germany) N Schunk	1	1
3	(Egypt) M Sherif	6	6
(Slovakia) R Šramková	3	2

Semifinals
(Romania) J Cristian	6^{3}	6	4
3	(Egypt) M Sherif	7^{7}	4	6

=== Bottom half ===
First round
8	(Romania) I Bara	3	6	6
(Argentina) P Ormaechea	6	4	3
(Georgia (country)) E Gorgodze	4	6^{6}
(Hungary) D Gálfi	6	7^{8}
(United States) G Min	6	6
Q	(Italy) G Gatto-Monticone	0	2
(Russia) A Gasanova	6^{4}	3
4	(Italy) M Trevisan	7^{7}	6
6	(Belgium) M Zanevska	5	6	6
(Spain) C Bucșa	7	4	2
(Germany) T Korpatsch	2	6^{6}
Q	(Croatia) T Mrdeža	6	7^{8}
(Poland) M Fręch	6	6
WC	(Germany) A Vecic	2	2
(Hungary) A Bondár	6	6^{3}	7
2	(Slovakia) AK Schmiedlová	2	7^{7}	5

Second round
8	(Romania) I Bara	4	3
(Hungary) D Gálfi	6	6
(United States) G Min	1	6^{3}
4	(Italy) M Trevisan	6	7^{7}
6	(Belgium) M Zanevska	6	6
Q	(Croatia) T Mrdeža	1	2
(Poland) M Fręch	3	3
(Hungary) A Bondár	6	6

Quarterfinals
(Hungary) D Gálfi	6^{2}	5
4	(Italy) M Trevisan	7^{7}	7
6	(Belgium) M Zanevska	1	6	6
(Hungary) A Bondár	6	4	4

Semifinals
4	(Italy) M Trevisan	6	4	6
6	(Belgium) M Zanevska	3	6	4

== Qualifying ==
=== Seeds ===
1. (Italy) Giulia Gatto-Monticone (qualified)
2. (Germany) Mona Barthel (qualifying competition)
3. (Croatia) Tereza Mrdeža (qualified)
4. (Germany) Katharina Hobgarski (qualified)

=== Qualifiers ===
1. (Italy) Giulia Gatto-Monticone
2. (Germany) Yana Morderger
3. (Croatia) Tereza Mrdeža
4. (Germany) Katharina Hobgarski

=== Qualifying draw ===
==== First qualifier ====
Qualifying competition
1	(Italy) Giulia Gatto-Monticone	1	6	6
	(Germany) Anna Zaja	6	4	3

==== Second qualifier ====
Qualifying competition
2	(Germany) Mona Barthel	0	6	2
	(Germany) Yana Morderger	6	3	6

==== Third qualifier ====
Qualifying competition
3	(Croatia) Tereza Mrdeža	6	6
WC	(Germany) Eva Lys	0	3

==== Fourth qualifier ====
Qualifying competition
4	(Germany) Katharina Hobgarski	6	6
WC	(Germany) Joëlle Steur	3	2
