= 2022 Korea Open =

2022 Korea Open may refer to:

- 2022 Korea Open (badminton)
- 2022 Korea Open (tennis)
