= 2021 Montevideo Open =

- Date: 15–21 November
- Edition: 1st
- Category: WTA 125
- Prize money: $115,000
- Surface: Clay
- Location: Montevideo, Uruguay
- Venue: Carrasco Lawn Tennis Club

Champions

Singles
- (France) Diane Parry

Doubles
- (Romania) Irina Bara / (Georgia (country)) Ekaterine Gorgodze
- Montevideo Open

The 2021 Montevideo Open was a professional tennis tournament played on red clay courts in Montevideo. It was the first edition for the women and man that was also part of the 2021 WTA 125K series. It took place at the Carrasco Lawn Tennis Club in Montevideo, Uruguay between November 8 and 21, 2021. The 2020 edition could not take place due to the COVID-19 pandemic.

== Singles main-draw entrants ==
=== Seeds ===
| Country | Player | Rank^{1} | Seed |
|---|---|---|---|
| BRA | Beatriz Haddad Maia | 80 | 1 |
| HUN | Anna Bondár | 107 | 2 |
| HUN | Panna Udvardy | 116 | 3 |
| ROU | Irina Bara | 133 | 4 |
| FRA | Diane Parry | 149 | 5 |
| GEO | Ekaterine Gorgodze | 154 | 6 |
| ARG | Paula Ormaechea | 214 | 7 |
| BRA | Laura Pigossi | 218 | 8 |

- Rankings are as of November 8, 2021.

=== Other entrants ===
The following players received wildcards into the singles man draw:

- (Uruguay) Guillermina Grant
- (Spain) Ane Mintegi del Olmo

The following players received entry from the qualifying draw:

- (Argentina) Marina Bulbarella
- (Argentina) Martina Capurro Taborda
- (United States) Dasha Ivanova
- (Australia) Olivia Tjandramulia

=== Withdrawals ===
Before the tournament

- (Brazil) Gabriela Cé → replaced by (Brazil) Carolina Alves
- (United States) Grace Min → replaced by (Mexico) Ana Sofía Sánchez
- (Croatia) Tereza Mrdeža → replaced by (Brazil) Laura Pigossi
- (Chile) Daniela Seguel → replaced by (Canada) Carol Zhao
- (Egypt) Mayar Sherif → replaced by (Spain) Marina Bassols Ribera
- (Russia) Anastasia Tikhonova → replaced by (Russia) Elina Avanesyan
- (Mexico) Renata Zarazúa → replaced by (Czech Republic) Anna Sisková
- (China) Zhang Shuai → replaced by (Chile) Bárbara Gatica

== Doubles main-draw entrants ==
=== Seeds ===
| Country | Player | Country | Player | Rank^{1} | Seed |
|---|---|---|---|---|---|
| ROU | Irina Bara | GEO | Ekaterine Gorgodze | 158 | 1 |
| NED | Arianne Hartono | AUS | Olivia Tjandramulia | 373 | 2 |
| HUN | Anna Bondár | HUN | Panna Udvardy | 377 | 3 |
| ARG | María Lourdes Carlé | BRA | Laura Pigossi | 408 | 4 |

- Rankings are as of November 8, 2021

=== Other entrants ===
The following pairs received wildcards into the doubles man draw:

- (Uruguay) Guillermina Grant / (Uruguay) Juliana Rodríguez

== Champions ==
=== Singles ===
- (France) Diane Parry def. (Hungary) Panna Udvardy, 6–3, 6–2

=== Doubles ===
- (Romania) Irina Bara / (Georgia (country)) Ekaterine Gorgodze def. (Brazil) Carolina Alves / (Spain) Marina Bassols Ribera 6–4, 6–3
