= 2021 Karlsruhe Open – Doubles =

Doubles
- 2021 Karlsruhe Open

Final
- Champions: (Romania) Irina Bara (Georgia (country)) Ekaterine Gorgodze
- Runners-up: (Poland) Katarzyna Piter (Egypt) Mayar Sherif
- Score: 6–3, 2–6, [10–7]

Events
Singles	Doubles
← 2019 ·	Karlsruhe Open	· 2022 →

Lara Arruabarrena and Renata Voráčová were the defending champions having won the previous edition in 2019, but chose not to participate.

Irina Bara and Ekaterine Gorgodze won the title, defeating Katarzyna Piter and Mayar Sherif in the final, 6–3, 2–6, [10–7].

== Seeds ==
1. (Australia) Astra Sharma / (Netherlands) Rosalie van der Hoek (quarterfinals)
2. (Germany) Vivian Heisen / (Belgium) Kimberley Zimmermann (semifinals)
3. (Poland) Katarzyna Piter / (Egypt) Mayar Sherif (final)
4. (Romania) Irina Bara / (Georgia (country)) Ekaterine Gorgodze (champions)

== Draw ==
=== Key ===
- Q = Qualifier
- WC = Wild card
- LL = Lucky loser
- Alt = Alternate
- SE = Special exempt
- PR = Protected ranking
- ITF = ITF entry
- JE = Junior exempt
- w/o = Walkover
- r = Retired
- d = Defaulted
- SR = Special ranking

=== Draw ===
Quarterfinals
1	(Australia) A Sharma (Netherlands) R van der Hoek	1	4
(Russia) N Dzalamidze (Russia) A Panova	6	6
(Russia) A Fomina-Klotz (Russia) E Yashina	5	2
4	(Romania) I Bara (Georgia (country)) E Gorgodze	7	6
3	(Poland) K Piter (Egypt) M Sherif	6	6
WC	(Germany) N Schunk (Germany) A Vecic	2	4
(Germany) M Barthel (Germany) T Maria	4	4
2	(Germany) V Heisen (Belgium) K Zimmermann	6	6

Semifinals
(Russia) N Dzalamidze (Russia) A Panova	3	1
4	(Romania) I Bara (Georgia (country)) E Gorgodze	6	6
3	(Poland) K Piter (Egypt) M Sherif	6	2	[10]
2	(Germany) V Heisen (Belgium) K Zimmermann	2	6	[3]

Final
4	(Romania) Irina Bara (Georgia (country)) Ekaterine Gorgodze	6	2	[10]
3	(Poland) Katarzyna Piter (Egypt) Mayar Sherif	3	6	[7]
