= 2022 Korea Open – Women's singles =

Women's singles
- 2022 Korea Open

Final
- Champion: Ekaterina Alexandrova
- Runner-up: (Latvia) Jeļena Ostapenko
- Score: 7–6^{(7–4)}, 6–0

Details
- Draw: 32
- Seeds: 8

Events
Singles	men	women
Doubles	men	women
← 2021 ·	Korea Open	· 2023 →

Ekaterina Alexandrova defeated Jeļena Ostapenko in the final, 7–6^{(7–4)}, 6–0 to win the women's singles tennis title at the 2022 Korea Open.

Zhu Lin was the defending champion from when the event was a WTA 125 tournament, but lost to Tatjana Maria in the quarterfinals.

== Seeds ==
1. (Latvia) Jeļena Ostapenko (final)
2. Ekaterina Alexandrova (champion)
3. (Poland) Magda Linette (quarterfinals)
4. (China) Zhu Lin (quarterfinals)
5. Varvara Gracheva (first round)
6. (United Kingdom) Emma Raducanu (semifinals, retired)
7. (Germany) Tatjana Maria (semifinals)
8. (Canada) Rebecca Marino (second round)

== Draw ==
=== Key ===
- Q = Qualifier
- WC = Wild card
- LL = Lucky loser
- Alt = Alternate
- SE = Special exempt
- PR = Protected ranking
- ITF = ITF entry
- JE = Junior exempt
- w/o = Walkover
- r = Retired
- d = Defaulted
- SR = Special ranking

=== Finals ===
Semifinals
1	(Latvia) Jeļena Ostapenko	4	6	3
6	(United Kingdom) Emma Raducanu	6	3	0^{r}
7	(Germany) Tatjana Maria	2	4
2	Ekaterina Alexandrova	6	6

Final
1	(Latvia) Jeļena Ostapenko	6^{4}	0
2	Ekaterina Alexandrova	7^{7}	6

=== Top half ===
First round
1	(Latvia) J Ostapenko	6	3	7^{7}
WC	(South Korea) B-y Jeong	4	6	6^{2}
A Gasanova	7	7
Q	(Australia) A Sharma	5	5
(France) C Paquet	2	2
LL	(Andorra) V Jiménez Kasintseva	6	6
Q	(Croatia) J Fett	1	2
8	(Canada) R Marino	6	6
3	(Poland) M Linette	6	7
(Netherlands) A Hartono	2	5
(France) K Mladenovic	6	4	6
WC	(South Korea) S-h Park	4	6	3
(Czech Republic) L Fruhvirtová	1	4
PR	(Belgium) Y Wickmayer	6	6
(Japan) M Uchijima	2	4
6	(United Kingdom) E Raducanu	6	6

Second round
1	(Latvia) J Ostapenko	6	5	7
A Gasanova	3	7	5
LL	(Andorra) V Jiménez Kasintseva	6	6
8	(Canada) R Marino	4	2
3	(Poland) M Linette	4	7^{7}	6
(France) K Mladenovic	6	6^{5}	2
PR	(Belgium) Y Wickmayer	3	5
6	(United Kingdom) E Raducanu	6	7

Quarterfinals
1	(Latvia) J Ostapenko	6	6
LL	(Andorra) V Jiménez Kasintseva	2	1
3	(Poland) M Linette	2	2
6	(United Kingdom) E Raducanu	6	6

Semifinals
1	(Latvia) J Ostapenko	4	6	3
6	(United Kingdom) E Raducanu	6	3	0^{r}

=== Bottom half ===
First round
7	(Germany) T Maria	7^{7}	7^{7}
PR	(Canada) E Bouchard	6^{5}	6^{5}
PR	(Australia) K Birrell	6	4	6
(Australia) P Hon	4	6	4
(Australia) M Inglis	6	5	1
Q	(India) A Raina	4	7	6
(South Korea) S-j Jang	3	4
4	(China) L Zhu	6	6
5	V Gracheva	4	6^{1}
A Blinkova	6	7^{7}
Q	(Australia) L Cabrera	6^{6}	2
Q	(Switzerland) L Sun	7^{8}	6
Q	(South Korea) D-y Back	1	1
WC	(South Korea) N-l Han	6	6
(United States) A Muhammad	1	6	1
2	E Alexandrova	6	3	6

Second round
7	(Germany) T Maria	6	6
PR	(Australia) K Birrell	0	3
Q	(India) A Raina	1	3
4	(China) L Zhu	6	6
A Blinkova	4	6^{6}
Q	(Switzerland) L Sun	6	7^{8}
WC	(South Korea) N-l Han	1	3
2	E Alexandrova	6	6

Quarterfinals
7	(Germany) T Maria	6	6
4	(China) L Zhu	1	1
Q	(Switzerland) L Sun	5	6^{6}
2	E Alexandrova	7	7^{8}

Semifinals
7	(Germany) T Maria	2	4
2	E Alexandrova	6	6

== Qualifying ==
=== Seeds ===
1. (Serbia) Natalija Stevanović (first round)
2. (Andorra) Victoria Jiménez Kasintseva (qualifying competition, lucky loser)
3. (Greece) Valentini Grammatikopoulou (qualifying competition)
4. (Australia) Astra Sharma (qualified)
5. (Australia) Lizette Cabrera (qualified)
6. (Israel) Lina Glushko (first round)
7. (Croatia) Jana Fett (qualified)
8. (United States) Hanna Chang (first round)
9. (Lithuania) Justina Mikulskytė (first round)
10. (Latvia) Daniela Vismane (qualifying competition)
11. Ekaterina Kazionova (qualifying competition)
12. (India) Ankita Raina (qualified)

=== Qualifiers ===
1. (Croatia) Jana Fett
2. (Switzerland) Lulu Sun
3. (India) Ankita Raina
4. (Australia) Astra Sharma
5. (Australia) Lizette Cabrera
6. (South Korea) Back Da-yeon

=== Lucky loser ===
1. (Andorra) Victoria Jiménez Kasintseva

=== Qualifying draw ===
==== First qualifier ====
First round
1	(Serbia) Natalija Stevanović	3	6	0
WC	(South Korea) Ku Yeon-woo	6	4	6
(South Korea) Kim Da-bin	6^{2}	6	0
7	(Croatia) Jana Fett	7^{7}	4	6

Qualifying competition
WC	(South Korea) Ku Yeon-woo	4	4
7	(Croatia) Jana Fett	6	6

==== Second qualifier ====
First round
2	(Andorra) Victoria Jiménez Kasintseva	6	6
WC	(South Korea) Lee Eun-hye	1	1
(Switzerland) Lulu Sun	6	6
9	(Lithuania) Justina Mikulskytė	4	4

Qualifying competition
2	(Andorra) Victoria Jiménez Kasintseva	6	3	2
(Switzerland) Lulu Sun	3	6	6

==== Third qualifier ====
First round
3	(Greece) Valentini Grammatikopoulou	7	6^{3}	6
(Ukraine) Nadiia Kichenok	5	7^{7}	0
(India) Riya Bhatia	1	1
12	(India) Ankita Raina	6	6

Qualifying competition
3	(Greece) Valentini Grammatikopoulou	6^{4}	7^{7}	0
12	(India) Ankita Raina	7^{7}	6^{4}	6

==== Fourth qualifier ====
First round
4	(Australia) Astra Sharma	6	6
WC	(South Korea) Son Ha-yoon	0	1
(South Korea) Choi Ji-hee	6	3	4
11	Ekaterina Kazionova	3	6	6

Qualifying competition
4	(Australia) Astra Sharma	6	6
11	Ekaterina Kazionova	1	0

==== Fifth qualifier ====
First round
5	(Australia) Lizette Cabrera	7	6
(Chinese Taipei) Liang En-shuo	5	1
(Australia) Olivia Tjandramulia	6	1	7
8	(United States) Hanna Chang	4	6	5

Qualifying competition
5	(Australia) Lizette Cabrera	6	6
(Australia) Olivia Tjandramulia	1	2

==== Sixth qualifier ====
First round
6	(Israel) Lina Glushko	5	6	1
WC	(South Korea) Back Da-yeon	7	1	6
Alt	(China) Han Xinyun	4	5
10	(Latvia) Daniela Vismane	6	7

Qualifying competition
WC	(South Korea) Back Da-yeon	6	6
10	(Latvia) Daniela Vismane	2	3
