= 2022 Karlsruhe Open – Singles =

Singles
- 2022 Karlsruhe Open

Final
- Champion: (Egypt) Mayar Sherif
- Runner-up: (United States) Bernarda Pera
- Score: 6–2, 6–4

Events
Singles	Doubles
← 2021 ·	Karlsruhe Open	· 2023 →

Mayar Sherif was the defending champion and successfully defended her title, defeating Bernarda Pera in the final, 6–2, 6–4.

== Seeds ==
1. (Belgium) Alison Van Uytvanck (second round)
2. (Egypt) Mayar Sherif (champion)
3. (Hungary) Anna Bondár (semifinals)
4. (Belgium) Greet Minnen (second round, withdrew)
5. (Hungary) Panna Udvardy (quarterfinals)
6. (France) Clara Burel (first round)
7. (Hungary) Dalma Gálfi (quarterfinals)
8. (United States) Bernarda Pera (final)

== Draw ==
=== Key ===
- Q = Qualifier
- WC = Wild card
- LL = Lucky loser
- Alt = Alternate
- SE = Special exempt
- PR = Protected ranking
- ITF = ITF entry
- JE = Junior exempt
- w/o = Walkover
- r = Retired
- d = Defaulted
- SR = Special ranking

=== Finals ===
Semifinals
(Germany) Anna-Lena Friedsam	5	0^{r}
8	(United States) Bernarda Pera	7	2
3	(Hungary) Anna Bondár	2	2
2	(Egypt) Mayar Sherif	6	6

Final
8	(United States) Bernarda Pera	2	4
2	(Egypt) Mayar Sherif	6	6

=== Top half ===
First Round
1	(Belgium) A Van Uytvanck	6	6
(Germany) T Korpatsch	4	1
WC	(Germany) E Seidel	1	3
(Germany) A-L Friedsam	6	6
(Switzerland) S Vögele	6^{6}	3
(China) L Zhu	7^{8}	6
(Serbia) A Krunić	6	5	1
7	(Hungary) D Gálfi	3	7	6
4	(Belgium) G Minnen	6	6
PR	(Netherlands) B Schoofs	1	4
(Japan) M Hontama	6	6
WC	M Timofeeva	4	1
Alt	(Luxembourg) M Minella	4	3
(Germany) J Niemeier	6	6
(Germany) N Schunk	6	4	1
8	(United States) B Pera	4	6	6

Second Round
1	(Belgium) A Van Uytvanck	6^{2}	7^{7}	3
(Germany) A-L Friedsam	7^{7}	6^{5}	6
(China) L Zhu	7^{7}	5	1
7	(Hungary) D Gálfi	6^{5}	7	6
4	(Belgium) G Minnen
(Japan) M Hontama	w/o
(Germany) J Niemeier	6	4	6^{3}
8	(United States) B Pera	3	6	7^{7}

Quarterfinals
(Germany) A-L Friedsam	6	7^{7}
7	(Hungary) D Gálfi	3	6^{1}
(Japan) M Hontama	5	5
8	(United States) B Pera	7	7

Semifinals
(Germany) A-L Friedsam	5	0^{r}
8	(United States) B Pera	7	2

=== Bottom half ===
First Round
6	(France) C Burel	6	2	6^{6}
PR	(Australia) P Hon	3	6	7^{8}
(Georgia (country)) E Gorgodze	6	1	1
WC	(Germany) E Lys	2	6	6
(Bulgaria) V Tomova	3	3
(Canada) R Marino	6	6
(France) H Tan	4	2
3	(Hungary) A Bondár	6	6
5	(Hungary) P Udvardy	6	6
WC	(Germany) L Siegemund	3	2
(Germany) T Maria	6	4	2
(Romania) M Buzărnescu	1	6	6
(Brazil) L Pigossi	6	1
(Slovenia) P Hercog	4	0^{r}
(Ukraine) K Baindl	2	3
2	(Egypt) M Sherif	6	6

Second Round
PR	(Australia) P Hon	1	1
WC	(Germany) E Lys	6	6
(Canada) R Marino	3	2
3	(Hungary) A Bondár	6	6
5	(Hungary) P Udvardy	6	6
(Romania) M Buzărnescu	1	0
(Brazil) L Pigossi	2	2
2	(Egypt) M Sherif	6	6

Quarterfinals
WC	(Germany) E Lys	0	5
3	(Hungary) A Bondár	6	7
5	(Hungary) P Udvardy	4	6^{5}
2	(Egypt) M Sherif	6	7^{7}

Semifinals
3	(Hungary) A Bondár	2	2
2	(Egypt) M Sherif	6	6
