= 2018 Korea Open (tennis) =

- Date: 17–23 September
- Edition: 15th
- Category: WTA International
- Draw: 32S / 16D
- Prize money: US$250,000
- Surface: Hard
- Location: Seoul, South Korea
- Venue: Seoul Olympic Park Tennis Center

Champions

Singles
- (Netherlands) Kiki Bertens

Doubles
- (South Korea) Choi Ji-hee / (South Korea) Han Na-lae
← 2017 ·	Korea Open	· 2019 →

The 2018 Korea Open (also known as the 2018 KEB Hana Bank Korea Open for sponsorship purposes) was a women's professional tennis tournament played on hard courts. It was the 15th edition of the tournament, and part of the 2018 WTA Tour. It took place in Seoul, South Korea between 17 September and 23 September 2018. Second-seeded Kiki Bertens won the singles title.

== Finals ==
=== Singles ===
(Netherlands) Kiki Bertens defeated (Australia) Ajla Tomljanović 7–6^{(7–2)}, 4–6, 6–2

- It was Bertens' 3rd and last singles title of the year and the 7th of her career.

=== Doubles ===
(South Korea) Choi Ji-hee / (South Korea) Han Na-lae defeated (Chinese Taipei) Hsieh Shu-ying / (Chinese Taipei) Hsieh Su-wei 6–3, 6–2

== Points and prize money ==
=== Point distribution ===
Event	W	F	SF	QF	Round of 16	Round of 32	Q	Q2	Q1
Singles	280	180	110	60	30	1	18	12	1
Doubles	280	180	110	60	1	—	—	—	—

=== Prize money ===
Event	W	F	SF	QF	Round of 16	Round of 32	Q2	Q1
Singles	$43,000	$21,400	$11,500	$6,175	$3,400	$2,100	$1,020	$600
Doubles	$12,300	$6,400	$3,435	$1,820	$960	—	—	—
Doubles prize money per team

== Singles main-draw entrants ==
=== Seeds ===
Country	Player	Rank^{1}	Seed
LAT	Jeļena Ostapenko	10	1
NED	Kiki Bertens	12	2
GRE	Maria Sakkari	31	3
SVK	Magdaléna Rybáriková	34	4
BEL	Alison Van Uytvanck	38	5
TPE	Hsieh Su-wei	39	6
ROU	Irina-Camelia Begu	53	7
BEL	Kirsten Flipkens	56	8

- ^{1} Rankings are as of September 10, 2018

=== Other entrants ===
The following players received wildcards into the singles main draw:

- (South Korea) Choi Ji-hee
- (South Korea) Jang Su-jeong
- (South Korea) Park So-hyun

The following player received entry using a protected ranking into the singles main draw:

- (Russia) Margarita Gasparyan
- (United States) Bethanie Mattek-Sands
- (Luxembourg) Mandy Minella

The following players received entry from the qualifying draw:

- (Germany) Mona Barthel
- (Russia) Varvara Flink
- (South Korea) Han Na-lae
- (Australia) Priscilla Hon
- (Serbia) Dejana Radanović
- (Switzerland) Jil Teichmann

=== Withdrawals ===
- (Romania) Sorana Cîrstea → replaced by (Thailand) Luksika Kumkhum
- (Russia) Ekaterina Makarova → replaced by (United States) Bethanie Mattek-Sands
- (Germany) Tatjana Maria → replaced by (Slovenia) Dalila Jakupović

== Doubles main-draw entrants ==
=== Seeds ===
Country	Player	Country	Player	Rank^{1}	Seed
ROU	Irina-Camelia Begu	ROU	Raluca Olaru	77	1
SLO	Dalila Jakupović	CRO	Darija Jurak	104	2
AUS	Ellen Perez	AUS	Arina Rodionova	196	3
GER	Mona Barthel	SWE	Johanna Larsson	202	4

- ^{1} Rankings are as of September 10, 2018

=== Other entrants ===
The following pairs received wildcards into the doubles main draw:

- (South Korea) Choi Ji-hee / (South Korea) Han Na-lae
- (South Korea) Jang Su-jeong / (South Korea) Kim Na-ri
