= 2019 Karlsruhe Open – Doubles =

Doubles
- 2019 Karlsruhe Open

Final
- Champions: (Spain) Lara Arruabarrena (Czech Republic) Renata Voráčová
- Runners-up: (China) Han Xinyun (China) Yuan Yue
- Score: 6–7^{(2–7)}, 6–4, [10–4]

Events
Singles	Doubles
Karlsruhe Open	· 2021 →

This was the first edition of the tournament.

Lara Arruabarrena and Renata Voráčová won the title, defeating Han Xinyun and Yuan Yue in the final, 6–7^{(2–7)}, 6–4, [10–4].

== Seeds ==
1. (Spain) Lara Arruabarrena / (Czech Republic) Renata Voráčová (champions)
2. (Russia) Natela Dzalamidze / (Russia) Yana Sizikova (first round)
3. (Belgium) Greet Minnen / (Belgium) Alison Van Uytvanck (semifinals)
4. (Romania) Jaqueline Cristian / (Romania) Elena-Gabriela Ruse (semifinals)

== Draw ==
=== Key ===
- Q = Qualifier
- WC = Wild card
- LL = Lucky loser
- Alt = Alternate
- SE = Special exempt
- PR = Protected ranking
- ITF = ITF entry
- JE = Junior exempt
- w/o = Walkover
- r = Retired
- d = Defaulted
- SR = Special ranking

=== Draw ===
First round
1	(Spain) L Arruabarrena (Czech Republic) R Voráčová	6	6
(Croatia) T Mrdeža (Netherlands) E Wacanno	1	4
4	(Romania) J Cristian (Romania) E-G Ruse	6	6^{4}	[10]
WC	(Germany) S Lisicki (Netherlands) B Schoofs	3	7^{7}	[5]
(Germany) N Geuer (Slovenia) D Jakupović	1	3
3	(Belgium) G Minnen (Belgium) A Van Uytvanck	6	6
(China) X Han (China) Y Yuan	4	6	[10]
2	(Russia) N Dzalamidze (Russia) Y Sizikova	6	1	[4]

Semifinals
1	(Spain) L Arruabarrena (Czech Republic) R Voráčová	6	3	[10]
4	(Romania) J Cristian (Romania) E-G Ruse	4	6	[8]
3	(Belgium) G Minnen (Belgium) A Van Uytvanck	3	2
(China) X Han (China) Y Yuan	6	6

Final
1	(Spain) L Arruabarrena (Czech Republic) R Voráčová	6^{2}	6	[10]
(China) X Han (China) Y Yuan	7^{7}	4	[4]
