= 2022 Karlsruhe Open – Doubles =

Tennis tournament

Doubles
- 2022 Karlsruhe Open

Final
- Champions: (Egypt) Mayar Sherif (Hungary) Panna Udvardy
- Runners-up: Yana Sizikova (Belgium) Alison Van Uytvanck
- Score: 5–7, 6–4, [10–2]

Events
Singles	Doubles
← 2021 ·	Karlsruhe Open	· 2023 →

Mayar Sherif and Panna Udvardy won the title, defeating Yana Sizikova and Alison Van Uytvanck in the final, 5–7, 6–4, [10–2].

Irina Bara and Ekaterine Gorgodze were the defending champions, but chose not to participate.

== Seeds ==
1. (Poland) Katarzyna Piter / (Belgium) Kimberley Zimmermann (semifinals)
2. (Slovakia) Tereza Mihalíková / (Belgium) Greet Minnen (semifinals, withdrew)

== Draw ==
Key

- Q = Qualifier
- WC = Wild card
- LL = Lucky loser
- Alt = Alternate
- ITF = ITF entry
- PR = Protected ranking
- SR = Special ranking
- SE = Special exempt
- JE = Junior exempt
- JR = Junior Accelerator Programme entrant
- CO = College Accelerator Programme entrant
- NG = Next Gen Accelerator Program entrant
- w/o = Walkover
- r = Retired
- d = Defaulted

=== Draw ===
Quarterfinals
1	(Poland) K Piter (Belgium) K Zimmermann	6	6
WC	A Anshba; M Timofeeva	1	2
(Germany) T Korpatsch (Netherlands) B Schoofs	2	5
(Egypt) M Sherif (Hungary) P Udvardy	6	7
Y Sizikova (Belgium) A Van Uytvanck	7^{7}	7^{8}
Alt	(Romania) M Buzărnescu (Japan) M Hontama	6^{3}	6^{6}
(Germany) J Lohoff (Canada) R Marino	5	5
2	(Slovakia) T Mihalíková (Belgium) G Minnen	7	7

Semifinals
1	(Poland) K Piter (Belgium) K Zimmermann	3	2
(Egypt) M Sherif (Hungary) P Udvardy	6	6
Y Sizikova (Belgium) A Van Uytvanck	w/o
2	(Slovakia) T Mihalíková (Belgium) G Minnen

Final
(Egypt) M Sherif (Hungary) P Udvardy	5	6	[10]
Y Sizikova (Belgium) A Van Uytvanck	7	4	[2]
