= 2022 Korea Open (tennis) =

- Date: 19–25 September (women); 26 September – 2 October (men)
- Edition: 1st (men); 18th (women)
- Category: ATP Tour 250 (men); WTA 250 (women)
- Draw: 28S / 16D (men); 32S / 16D (women)
- Prize money: $1,237,570 (men) $251,750 (women)
- Surface: Hard, outdoor
- Location: Seoul, South Korea
- Venue: Seoul Olympic Park Tennis Center

Champions

Men's singles
- (Japan) Yoshihito Nishioka

Women's singles
- Ekaterina Alexandrova

Men's doubles
- (South Africa) Raven Klaasen / (United States) Nathaniel Lammons

Women's doubles
- (France) Kristina Mladenovic / (Belgium) Yanina Wickmayer
← 2021 ·	Korea Open (tennis)	· 2023 →

The 2022 Korea Open (also known for sponsorship purposes as the 2022 Eugene Korea Open Tennis Championships for the men's tournament and the 2022 Hana Bank Korea Open for the women's tournament) was a combined ATP Tour and WTA Tour tennis tournament took place at the Olympic Park Tennis Center in Seoul, South Korea on outdoor hard courts from 19 to 25 September 2022 for the women and from 26 September to 2 October 2022 for the men. It was the 18th edition of the women's tournament, and the first edition of the men's tournament since 1996. The tournament was a WTA 250 event on the 2022 WTA Tour (after being a WTA 125 level tournament in 2021), and a ATP Tour 250 event on the 2022 ATP Tour after several tournaments in China were cancelled because of the ongoing COVID-19 pandemic.

== Finals ==
=== Men's singles ===
- (Japan) Yoshihito Nishioka defeated (Canada) Denis Shapovalov 6–4, 7–6^{(7–5)}

This is Nishioka's first title of the season and the second of his career.

=== Women's singles ===
- Ekaterina Alexandrova defeated (Latvia) Jeļena Ostapenko 7–6^{(7–4)}, 6–0

This is Alexandrova's second title of the season and third of her career.

=== Men's doubles ===
- (South Africa) Raven Klaasen / (United States) Nathaniel Lammons defeated (Colombia) Nicolás Barrientos / (Mexico) Miguel Ángel Reyes-Varela 6–1, 7–5

=== Women's doubles ===
- (France) Kristina Mladenovic / (Belgium) Yanina Wickmayer defeated (United States) Asia Muhammad / (United States) Sabrina Santamaria 6–3, 6–2

== ATP singles main draw entrants ==
=== Seeds ===
Country	Player	Rank	Seeds
NOR	Casper Ruud	2	1
GBR	Cameron Norrie	8	2
~~USA~~	~~Taylor Fritz~~	~~12~~	~~3~~
CAN	Denis Shapovalov	24	4
GBR	Dan Evans	25	5
~~CRO~~	~~Borna Ćorić~~	~~26~~	~~6~~
SRB	Miomir Kecmanović	33	7
USA	Jenson Brooksby	50	8

- Rankings are as of 19 September 2022.

=== Other entrants ===
The following players received wildcards into the singles main draw:

- (South Korea) Hong Seong-chan
- (South Korea) Nam Ji-sung
- (Japan) Kaichi Uchida

The following players received entry from the qualifying draw:

- (South Korea) Chung Yun-seong
- (Chile) Nicolás Jarry
- (Japan) Yosuke Watanuki
- (Chinese Taipei) Wu Tung-lin

The following players received entry as lucky losers:

- (United States) Aleksandar Kovacevic
- (Japan) Shintaro Mochizuki
- (Japan) Hiroki Moriya
- (United Kingdom) Ryan Peniston

=== Withdrawals ===
Before the tournament

- (Croatia) Borna Ćorić → replaced by (Japan) Hiroki Moriya
- (United States) Taylor Fritz → replaced by (Japan) Shintaro Mochizuki
- (Chile) Cristian Garín → replaced by (Ecuador) Emilio Gómez
- (United States) Marcos Giron → replaced by (United Kingdom) Ryan Peniston
- (United States) Brandon Nakashima → replaced by (United States) Aleksandar Kovacevic
- (United States) Frances Tiafoe → replaced by (Chinese Taipei) Tseng Chun-hsin
- (Czech Republic) Jiří Veselý → replaced by (Japan) Taro Daniel
- (Germany) Alexander Zverev → replaced by (Moldova) Radu Albot

== ATP doubles main draw entrants ==
=== Seeds ===
Country	Player	Country	Player	Rank^{1}	Seed
RSA	Raven Klaasen	USA	Nathaniel Lammons	139	1
COL	Nicolás Barrientos	MEX	Miguel Ángel Reyes-Varela	144	2
ECU	Diego Hidalgo	COL	Cristian Rodríguez	149	3
SWE	André Göransson	JPN	Ben McLachlan	151	4

- Rankings are as of 19 September 2022

=== Other entrants ===
The following pairs received wildcards into the doubles main draw:

- (South Korea) Chung Hyeon / (South Korea) Kwon Soon-woo
- (South Korea) Nam Ji-sung / (South Korea) Song Min-kyu

The following pair received entry as alternates:

- (Moldova) Radu Albot / (Chinese Taipei) Tseng Chun-hsin

=== Withdrawals ===
- (Australia) Matthew Ebden / (Australia) John Peers → replaced by (Serbia) Miomir Kecmanović / (Australia) John Peers
- (United States) Marcos Giron / (United States) Mackenzie McDonald → replaced by (Moldova) Radu Albot / (Chinese Taipei) Tseng Chun-hsin

== WTA singles main draw entrants ==
=== Seeds ===
Country	Player	Rank	Seeds
LAT	Jeļena Ostapenko	15	1
	Ekaterina Alexandrova	24	2
POL	Magda Linette	67	3
CHN	Zhu Lin	69	4
	Varvara Gracheva	80	5
GBR	Emma Raducanu	83	6
GER	Tatjana Maria	84	7
CAN	Rebecca Marino	90	8

- Rankings are as of 12 September 2022.

=== Other entrants ===
The following players received wildcards into the singles main draw:

- (South Korea) Jeong Bo-young
- (South Korea) Han Na-lae
- (South Korea) Park So-hyun

The following players received entry using a protected ranking into the singles main draw:

- (Australia) Kimberly Birrell
- (Canada) Eugenie Bouchard
- (Belgium) Yanina Wickmayer

The following players received entry from the qualifying draw:

- (South Korea) Back Da-yeon
- (Australia) Lizette Cabrera
- (Croatia) Jana Fett
- (India) Ankita Raina
- (Australia) Astra Sharma
- (Switzerland) Lulu Sun

The following player received entry as a lucky loser:

- (Andorra) Victoria Jiménez Kasintseva

=== Withdrawals ===
Before the tournament

- (United Kingdom) Katie Boulter → replaced by Anna Blinkova
- (Serbia) Aleksandra Krunić → replaced by (Australia) Priscilla Hon
- Evgeniya Rodina → replaced by (Belgium) Yanina Wickmayer
- (United Kingdom) Katie Swan → replaced by (Andorra) Victoria Jiménez Kasintseva

== WTA doubles main draw entrants ==
=== Seeds ===
Country	Player	Country	Player	Rank^{1}	Seed
USA	Asia Muhammad	USA	Sabrina Santamaria	114	1
USA	Kaitlyn Christian		Lidziya Marozava	119	2
	Ekaterina Alexandrova		Yana Sizikova	137	3
GEO	Oksana Kalashnikova	UKR	Nadiia Kichenok	174	4

- ^{1} Rankings as of 12 September 2022.

=== Other entrants ===
The following pairs received wildcards into the doubles main draw:

- (South Korea) Choi Ji-hee / (South Korea) Park So-hyun
- (South Korea) Kim Da-bin / (South Korea) Ku Yeon-woo
