= 2018 Korea Open – Doubles =

Doubles
- 2018 Korea Open

Final
- Champions: (South Korea) Choi Ji-hee (South Korea) Han Na-lae
- Runners-up: (Chinese Taipei) Hsieh Shu-ying (Chinese Taipei) Hsieh Su-wei
- Score: 6–3, 6–2

Details
- Draw: 16
- Seeds: 4

Events
Singles	Doubles
← 2017 ·	Korea Open	· 2019 →

Kiki Bertens and Johanna Larsson were the defending champions, but Bertens chose not to participate. Larsson played alongside Mona Barthel, but lost in the semifinals to Hsieh Shu-ying and Hsieh Su-wei.

Choi Ji-hee and Han Na-lae won the title, defeating Hsieh and Hsieh in the final, 6–3, 6–2.

== Seeds ==
1. (Romania) Irina-Camelia Begu / (Romania) Raluca Olaru (quarterfinals)
2. (Slovenia) Dalila Jakupović / (Croatia) Darija Jurak (quarterfinals)
3. (Australia) Ellen Perez / (Australia) Arina Rodionova (semifinals)
4. (Germany) Mona Barthel / (Sweden) Johanna Larsson (semifinals)

== Draw ==
=== Key ===
- Q = Qualifier
- WC = Wild card
- LL = Lucky loser
- Alt = Alternate
- SE = Special exempt
- PR = Protected ranking
- ITF = ITF entry
- JE = Junior exempt
- w/o = Walkover
- r = Retired
- d = Defaulted
- SR = Special ranking

=== Draw ===
First round
1	(Romania) I-C Begu (Romania) R Olaru	6	7^{7}
(United States) J Cako (Germany) N Geuer	4	6^{5}
(Chinese Taipei) S-y Hsieh (Chinese Taipei) S-w Hsieh	6	6
(Slovakia) AK Schmiedlová (Slovenia) T Zidanšek	4	4
4	(Germany) M Barthel (Sweden) J Larsson	6	7^{7}
(Slovakia) C Škamlová (Netherlands) E Wacanno	4	6^{5}
WC	(South Korea) S-j Jang (South Korea) N-r Kim	2	6^{4}
(Thailand) L Kumkhum (Thailand) P Plipuech	6	7^{7}
(United Kingdom) H Dart (Netherlands) B Schoofs	5	1
(Czech Republic) B Štefková (Czech Republic) R Voráčová	7	6
(China) C Liang (China) Q Ye	4	1
3	(Australia) E Perez (Australia) Ar Rodionova	6	6
(Australia) P Hon (Russia) Y Sizikova	3	7^{7}	[4]
WC	(South Korea) J-h Choi (South Korea) N-l Han	6	6^{2}	[10]
(Netherlands) A Rus (Serbia) N Stojanović	0^{r}
2	(Slovenia) D Jakupović (Croatia) D Jurak	2

Quarterfinals
1	(Romania) I-C Begu (Romania) R Olaru	6	1	[8]
(Chinese Taipei) S-y Hsieh (Chinese Taipei) S-w Hsieh	3	6	[10]
4	(Germany) M Barthel (Sweden) J Larsson	7^{7}	3	[10]
(Thailand) L Kumkhum (Thailand) P Plipuech	6^{4}	6	[8]
(Czech Republic) B Štefková (Czech Republic) R Voráčová	0	4
3	(Australia) E Perez (Australia) Ar Rodionova	6	6
WC	(South Korea) J-h Choi (South Korea) N-l Han	7	4	[10]
2	(Slovenia) D Jakupović (Croatia) D Jurak	5	6	[5]

Semifinals
(Chinese Taipei) S-y Hsieh (Chinese Taipei) S-w Hsieh	3	6	[12]
4	(Germany) M Barthel (Sweden) J Larsson	6	1	[10]
3	(Australia) E Perez (Australia) Ar Rodionova	1	1
WC	(South Korea) J-h Choi (South Korea) N-l Han	6	6

Final
(Chinese Taipei) S-y Hsieh (Chinese Taipei) S-w Hsieh	3	2
WC	(South Korea) J-h Choi (South Korea) N-l Han	6	6
