= 2021 Korea Open =

- Date: 20–26 December
- Edition: 17th
- Category: WTA 125
- Draw: 28S / 8D
- Prize money: $115,000
- Surface: Hard (Indoor)
- Location: Seoul, South Korea
- Venue: Seoul Olympic Park Tennis Center

Champions

Singles
- (China) Zhu Lin

Doubles
- (South Korea) Choi Ji-hee / (South Korea) Han Na-lae
← 2019 ·	Korea Open	· 2022 →

The 2021 Korea Open (also known as the 2021 Hana Bank Korea Open for sponsorship purposes) was a professional women's tennis tournament played on indoor hard courts. After the cancellation of the 2020 edition, the 2021 edition was also delayed and later downgraded to WTA 125 level from WTA 250 level as a result of COVID-19 pandemic. It was the 17th edition of the tournament, and part of the 2021 WTA 125K series. It took place in Seoul, South Korea between 20 and 26 December 2021. Second-seeded Zhu Lin wo the singles title.

== Finals ==
=== Singles ===
- (China) Zhu Lin defeated (France) Kristina Mladenovic 6–0, 6–4

=== Doubles ===
- (South Korea) Choi Ji-hee / (South Korea) Han Na-lae defeated (Greece) Valentini Grammatikopoulou / (Hungary) Réka Luca Jani 6–4, 6–4

== Singles main-draw entrants ==
=== Seeds ===
Country	Player	Rank^{1}	Seed
FRA	Kristina Mladenovic	99	1
CHN	Zhu Lin	142	2
HUN	Réka Luca Jani	170	3
GRE	Valentini Grammatikopoulou	184	4
NED	Arianne Hartono	196	5
KOR	Jang Su-jeong	215	6
BUL	Isabella Shinikova	226	7
JPN	Yuki Naito	262	8

- ^{1} Rankings are as of December 13, 2021

=== Other entrants ===
The following players received wildcards into the singles main draw:

- (South Korea) Back Da-yeon
- (Czech Republic) Brenda Fruhvirtová
- (South Korea) Jeong Bo-young
- (South Korea) Park Eun-yeong

The following player received entry as an alternate:

- (South Korea) Moon Jeong

=== Withdrawals ===
Before the tournament

- (United Kingdom) Jodie Burrage → replaced by (Canada) Carol Zhao
- (United States) Hanna Chang → replaced by (Finland) Anastasia Kulikova
- (Italy) Federica Di Sarra → replaced by (Thailand) Peangtarn Plipuech
- (Japan) Nao Hibino → replaced by (South Korea) Moon Jeong
- (Japan) Mai Hontama → replaced by (India) Riya Bhatia
- (United States) Dasha Ivanova → replaced by (South Korea) Kim Da-bin
- (Czech Republic) Anna Sisková → replaced by (Czech Republic) Linda Fruhvirtová
- (China) Zhang Shuai → replaced by (South Korea) Choi Ji-hee

== Doubles main-draw entrants ==
=== Seeds ===
Country	Player	Country	Player	Rank^{1}	Seed
NED	Arianne Hartono	AUS	Olivia Tjandramulia	310	1
GRE	Valentini Grammatikopoulou	HUN	Réka Luca Jani	381	2

- ^{1} Rankings are as of December 13, 2021

=== Other entrants ===
The following pair received wildcards into the doubles main draw:

- (South Korea) Jeong Bo-young / (South Korea) Jeong Yeong-won
