= 2019 Karlsruhe Open – Singles =

Singles
- 2019 Karlsruhe Open

Final
- Champion: (Romania) Patricia Maria Țig
- Runner-up: (Belgium) Alison Van Uytvanck
- Score: 3–6, 6–1, 6–2

Events
Singles	Doubles
Karlsruhe Open	· 2021 →

This was the first edition of the tournament.

Patricia Maria Țig won the title, defeating Alison Van Uytvanck in the final, 3–6, 6–1, 6–2.

== Seeds ==
1. (Slovenia) Tamara Zidanšek (first round, retired)
2. (Belgium) Alison Van Uytvanck (final)
3. (Germany) Tatjana Maria (second round)
4. (Germany) Laura Siegemund (second round)
5. (Australia) Daria Gavrilova (first round)
6. (Romania) Irina-Camelia Begu (second round, retired)
7. (Switzerland) Stefanie Vögele (second round)
8. (Czech Republic) Barbora Krejčíková (first round)

== Draw ==
Key

- Q = Qualifier
- WC = Wild card
- LL = Lucky loser
- Alt = Alternate
- ITF = ITF entry
- PR = Protected ranking
- SR = Special ranking
- SE = Special exempt
- JE = Junior exempt
- JR = Junior Accelerator Programme entrant
- CO = College Accelerator Programme entrant
- NG = Next Gen Accelerator Program entrant
- w/o = Walkover
- r = Retired
- d = Defaulted

=== Finals ===
Semifinals
PR	(Romania) Patricia Maria Țig	6	6
(Italy) Jasmine Paolini	2	0
(Spain) Paula Badosa	6^{3}	6^{6}
2	(Belgium) Alison Van Uytvanck	7^{7}	7^{8}

Final
PR	(Romania) Patricia Maria Țig	3	6	6
2	(Belgium) Alison Van Uytvanck	6	1	2

=== Top half ===
First round
1	(Slovenia) T Zidanšek	5	4^{r}
(Georgia (country)) E Gorgodze	7	3
WC	(Germany) K Hobgarski	3	1
(Netherlands) B Schoofs	6	6
(Germany) A Lottner	2	2
(Romania) E-G Ruse	6	6
PR	(Romania) PM Țig	6	6
8	(Czech Republic) B Krejčíková	3	4
3	(Germany) T Maria	6	6
(China) X Han	1	0
Q	(Germany) S Wagner	7^{7}	6
Q	(China) Y Yuan	6^{4}	2
WC	(Germany) S Lisicki	6	4	1
(Italy) J Paolini	3	6	6
(Czech Republic) T Martincová	6	7^{7}
5	(Australia) D Gavrilova	4	6^{3}

Second round
(Georgia (country)) E Gorgodze	7	7
(Netherlands) B Schoofs	5	5
(Romania) E-G Ruse	5	5
PR	(Romania) PM Țig	7	7
3	(Germany) T Maria	3	6	4
Q	(Germany) S Wagner	6	4	6
(Italy) J Paolini	4	7^{7}	3
(Czech Republic) T Martincová	6	6^{5}	0^{r}

Quarterfinals
(Georgia (country)) E Gorgodze	5	0
PR	(Romania) PM Țig	7	6
Q	(Germany) S Wagner	5	4
(Italy) J Paolini	7	6

Semifinals
PR	(Romania) PM Țig	6	6
(Italy) J Paolini	2	0

=== Bottom half ===
First round
7	(Switzerland) S Vögele	6	3	6
WC	(Germany) J Niemeier	3	6	3
(Germany) T Korpatsch	6	6
LL	(Germany) L Cammilleri	0	0
(Spain) L Arruabarrena	3	4
(Spain) P Badosa	6	6
(Slovenia) D Jakupović	1	2
4	(Germany) L Siegemund	6	6
6	(Romania) I-C Begu	6^{4}	6	6
Q	(Czech Republic) R Voráčová	7^{7}	4	4
(Netherlands) R Hogenkamp	1	0
(Croatia) T Mrdeža	6	6
(Romania) J Cristian	4	4
Q	(Romania) LI Paar	6	6
(Belgium) G Minnen	4	6	1
2	(Belgium) A Van Uytvanck	6	1	6

Second round
7	(Switzerland) S Vögele	3	4
(Germany) T Korpatsch	6	6
(Spain) P Badosa	6	6
4	(Germany) L Siegemund	4	1
6	(Romania) I-C Begu	3	1^{r}
(Croatia) T Mrdeža	6	2
Q	(Romania) LI Paar	2	3
2	(Belgium) A Van Uytvanck	6	6

Quarterfinals
(Germany) T Korpatsch	2	4
(Spain) P Badosa	6	6
(Croatia) T Mrdeža	1	3
2	(Belgium) A Van Uytvanck	6	6

Semifinals
(Spain) P Badosa	6^{3}	6^{6}
2	(Belgium) A Van Uytvanck	7^{7}	7^{8}

== Qualifying ==
=== Seeds ===
1. (Romania) Laura Ioana Paar (qualified)
2. (China) Yuan Yue (qualified)
3. (Germany) Stephanie Wagner (qualified)
4. (Czech Republic) Renata Voráčová (qualified)

=== Qualifiers ===
1. (Romania) Laura Ioana Paar
2. (China) Yuan Yue
3. (Germany) Stephanie Wagner
4. (Czech Republic) Renata Voráčová

=== Lucky loser ===
1. (Germany) Liana Cammilleri

=== Qualifying draw ===
==== First qualifier ====
Qualifying competition
1	(Romania) Laura Ioana Paar
	Bye

==== Second qualifier ====
Qualifying competition
2	(China) Yuan Yue
	Bye

==== Third qualifier ====
Qualifying competition
3	(Germany) Stephanie Wagner	6	6
WC	(Germany) Sina Herrmann	0	1

==== Fourth qualifier ====
Qualifying competition
4	(Czech Republic) Renata Voráčová	6	6
WC	(Germany) Liana Cammilleri	0	0
