= 2022 Karlsruhe Open =

- Date: 10 – 15 May
- Edition: 3rd
- Category: WTA 125
- Draw: 32S / 8D
- Prize money: $115,000
- Surface: Clay
- Location: Karlsruhe, Germany
- Venue: TC Rüppurr

Champions

Singles
- (Egypt) Mayar Sherif

Doubles
- (Egypt) Mayar Sherif / (Hungary) Panna Udvardy
| ← 2021 · | Karlsruhe Open | · 2023 → |

The 2022 Karlsruhe Open (also known as the Liqui Moly Open for sponsorship reasons) was a professional tennis tournament played on outdoor clay courts. It was the 3rd edition of the tournament and part of the 2022 WTA 125 tournaments, offering a total of $115,000 in prize money. It took place in Karlsruhe, Germany between 10 and 15 May 2022.

== Singles main draw entrants ==
=== Seeds ===
| Country | Player | Rank^{1} | Seed |
|---|---|---|---|
| BEL | Alison Van Uytvanck | 59 | 1 |
| EGY | Mayar Sherif | 61 | 2 |
| HUN | Anna Bondár | 68 | 3 |
| BEL | Greet Minnen | 79 | 4 |
| HUN | Panna Udvardy | 83 | 5 |
| FRA | Clara Burel | 84 | 6 |
| HUN | Dalma Gálfi | 91 | 7 |
| USA | Bernarda Pera | 100 | 8 |

- ^{1} Rankings as of 25 April 2022.

=== Other entrants ===
The following players received a wildcard into the singles main draw:

- (Germany) Eva Lys
- (Germany) Ella Seidel
- (Germany) Laura Siegemund
- Maria Timofeeva

The following players received entry into the singles main draw through protected ranking:

- (Australia) Priscilla Hon
- (Netherlands) Bibiane Schoofs

=== Withdrawals ===
Before the tournament

- (Romania) Irina Bara → replaced by (Netherlands) Bibiane Schoofs
- (United Kingdom) Harriet Dart → replaced by (Poland) Katarzyna Kawa
- Vitalia Diatchenko → replaced by (Liechtenstein) Kathinka von Deichmann

== Doubles entrants ==
=== Seeds ===
| Country | Player | Country | Player | Rank^{1} | Seed |
|---|---|---|---|---|---|
| POL | Katarzyna Piter | BEL | Kimberley Zimmermann | 157 | 1 |
| SVK | Tereza Mihalíková | BEL | Greet Minnen | 158 | 2 |

- ^{1} Rankings as of 25 April 2022.

=== Other entrants ===
The following pair received a wildcard into the doubles main draw:

- Amina Anshba / Maria Timofeeva

== Champions ==
=== Singles ===
- (Egypt) Mayar Sherif def. (United States) Bernarda Pera 6–2, 6–4

=== Doubles ===
- (Egypt) Mayar Sherif / (Hungary) Panna Udvardy def. Yana Sizikova / (Belgium) Alison Van Uytvanck 5–7, 6–4, [10–2]
