= 2018 Korea Open – Singles =

Singles
- 2018 Korea Open

Final
- Champion: (Netherlands) Kiki Bertens
- Runner-up: (Australia) Ajla Tomljanović
- Score: 7–6^{(7–2)}, 4–6, 6–2

Details
- Draw: 32
- Seeds: 8

Events
Singles	Doubles
- Korea Open

Jeļena Ostapenko was the defending champion, but lost in the second round to Ekaterina Alexandrova.

Kiki Bertens won the title, defeating Ajla Tomljanović in the final, 7–6^{(7–2)}, 4–6, 6–2.

This tournament was the last in Agnieszka Radwańska's career. The former world No. 2 played the final match of her professional career in the second round, when she lost to Irina-Camelia Begu in straight sets.

== Seeds ==
1. (Latvia) Jeļena Ostapenko (second round)
2. (Netherlands) Kiki Bertens (champion)
3. (Greece) Maria Sakkari (semifinals)
4. (Slovakia) Magdaléna Rybáriková (first round, retired)
5. (Belgium) Alison Van Uytvanck (first round)
6. (Chinese Taipei) Hsieh Su-wei (semifinals)
7. (Romania) Irina-Camelia Begu (Quarterfinal)
8. (Belgium) Kirsten Flipkens (second round)

== Draw ==
Key

- Q = Qualifier
- WC = Wild card
- LL = Lucky loser
- Alt = Alternate
- ITF = ITF entry
- PR = Protected ranking
- SR = Special ranking
- SE = Special exempt
- JE = Junior exempt
- JR = Junior Accelerator Programme entrant
- CO = College Accelerator Programme entrant
- NG = Next Gen Accelerator Program entrant
- w/o = Walkover
- r = Retired
- d = Defaulted

=== Finals ===
Semifinals
6	(Chinese Taipei) Hsieh Su-wei	4	7	4
(Australia) Ajla Tomljanović	6	5	6
3	(Greece) Maria Sakkari	4	2
2	(Netherlands) Kiki Bertens	6	6

Final
(Australia) Ajla Tomljanović	6^{2}	6	2
2	(Netherlands) Kiki Bertens	7^{7}	4	6

=== Top half ===
First round
1	(Latvia) J Ostapenko	6	6
(Spain) L Arruabarrena	3	3
(Sweden) J Larsson	1	2
(Russia) E Alexandrova	6	6
WC	(South Korea) J-h Choi	3	6	4
(Switzerland) S Vögele	6	2	6
Q	(Switzerland) J Teichmann	6	1	6^{0}
6	(Chinese Taipei) S-w Hsieh	2	6	7^{7}
4	(Slovakia) M Rybáriková	3	2^{r}
PR	(Luxembourg) M Minella	6	3
Q	(Australia) P Hon	3	6	6
WC	(South Korea) S-j Jang	6	2	2
(Slovenia) P Hercog	1	3
(Slovenia) T Zidanšek	6	6
(Australia) A Tomljanović	3	7	7
5	(Belgium) A Van Uytvanck	6	5	5

Second round
1	(Latvia) J Ostapenko	3	2
(Russia) E Alexandrova	6	6
(Switzerland) S Vögele	2	1
6	(Chinese Taipei) S-w Hsieh	6	6
PR	(Luxembourg) M Minella	6	6
Q	(Australia) P Hon	4	3
(Slovenia) T Zidanšek	6	1	3
(Australia) A Tomljanović	2	6	6

Quarterfinals
(Russia) E Alexandrova	0	1
6	(Chinese Taipei) S-w Hsieh	6	6
PR	(Luxembourg) M Minella	2	6	5
(Australia) A Tomljanović	6	4	7

Semifinals
6	(Chinese Taipei) S-w Hsieh	4	7	4
(Australia) A Tomljanović	6	5	6

=== Bottom half ===
First round
7	(Romania) I-C Begu	7	6
Q	(Germany) M Barthel	5	4
PR	(United States) B Mattek-Sands	4	5
(Poland) A Radwańska	6	7
Q	(Russia) V Flink	5	4
PR	(Russia) M Gasparyan	7	6
(Slovakia) AK Schmiedlová	0	1
3	(Greece) M Sakkari	6	6
8	(Belgium) K Flipkens	6	6
WC	(South Korea) S-h Park	0	2
(Russia) E Rodina	6	6
Q	(Serbia) D Radanović	1	1
(Slovenia) D Jakupović	3	6	6
Q	(South Korea) N-l Han	6	4	3
(Thailand) L Kumkhum	6^{7}	2
2	(Netherlands) K Bertens	7^{9}	6

Second round
7	(Romania) I-C Begu	6	6
(Poland) A Radwańska	4	3
PR	(Russia) M Gasparyan	2	2
3	(Greece) M Sakkari	6	6
8	(Belgium) K Flipkens	4	6	5
(Russia) E Rodina	6	4	7
(Slovenia) D Jakupović	4	5
2	(Netherlands) K Bertens	6	7

Quarterfinals
7	(Romania) I-C Begu	3	6	4
3	(Greece) M Sakkari	6	4	6
(Russia) E Rodina	6	3	0
2	(Netherlands) K Bertens	3	6	6

Semifinals
3	(Greece) M Sakkari	4	2
2	(Netherlands) K Bertens	6	6

== Qualifying ==
=== Seeds ===
1. (Germany) Mona Barthel (qualified)
2. (Netherlands) Arantxa Rus (qualifying competition)
3. (Switzerland) Jil Teichmann (qualified)
4. (Australia) Arina Rodionova (first round)
5. (United Kingdom) Harriet Dart (first round)
6. (Australia) Priscilla Hon (qualified)
7. (Spain) Sílvia Soler Espinosa (qualifying competition)
8. (Netherlands) Bibiane Schoofs (qualifying competition)
9. (Australia) Jaimee Fourlis (first round)
10. (Serbia) Dejana Radanović (qualified)
11. (Russia) Varvara Flink (qualified)
12. (Serbia) Nina Stojanović (first round)

=== Qualifiers ===
1. (Germany) Mona Barthel
2. (Russia) Varvara Flink
3. (Switzerland) Jil Teichmann
4. (Serbia) Dejana Radanović
5. (South Korea) Han Na-lae
6. (Australia) Priscilla Hon

=== Qualifying draw ===
==== First qualifier ====
First round
1	(Germany) Mona Barthel	6	6
WC	(United States) Hanna Chang	1	3
(Thailand) Peangtarn Plipuech	3	0
7	(Spain) Sílvia Soler Espinosa	6	6

Qualifying competition
1	(Germany) Mona Barthel	6	6
7	(Spain) Sílvia Soler Espinosa	3	4

==== Second qualifier ====
First round
2	(Netherlands) Arantxa Rus	6	7^{8}
WC	(South Korea) Kim Da-bin	2	6^{6}
WC	(South Korea) Jeong Su-nam	2	6	0
11	(Russia) Varvara Flink	6	3	6

Qualifying competition
2	(Netherlands) Arantxa Rus	1	6	6^{6}
11	(Russia) Varvara Flink	6	3	7^{8}

==== Third qualifier ====
First round
3	(Switzerland) Jil Teichmann	6	6
(France) Amandine Hesse	4	0
(Australia) Ellen Perez	0	4
8	(Netherlands) Bibiane Schoofs	6	6

Qualifying competition
3	(Switzerland) Jil Teichmann	6	4	7
8	(Netherlands) Bibiane Schoofs	4	6	5

==== Fourth qualifier ====
First round
4	(Australia) Arina Rodionova	7^{7}	0	2
(Japan) Mai Minokoshi	6^{3}	6	6
WC	(South Korea) Lee So-ra	6	2	1
10	(Serbia) Dejana Radanović	2	6	6

Qualifying competition
(Japan) Mai Minokoshi	1	4
10	(Serbia) Dejana Radanović	6	6

==== Fifth qualifier ====
First round
5	(United Kingdom) Harriet Dart	6	1	5
(South Korea) Han Na-lae	0	6	7
PR	(Czech Republic) Barbora Štefková	6	6
12	(Serbia) Nina Stojanović	1	1

Qualifying competition
(South Korea) Han Na-lae	7	6
PR	(Czech Republic) Barbora Štefková	5	3

==== Sixth qualifier ====
First round
6	(Australia) Priscilla Hon	6	6
(China) Zhang Yuxuan	4	4
(United Kingdom) Katy Dunne	2	6	6
9	(Australia) Jaimee Fourlis	6	2	2

Qualifying competition
6	(Australia) Priscilla Hon	7^{7}	6
(United Kingdom) Katy Dunne	6^{5}	2
