= 2021 Korea Open – Singles =

Singles
- 2021 Korea Open

Final
- Champion: (China) Zhu Lin
- Runner-up: (France) Kristina Mladenovic
- Score: 6–0, 6–4

Details
- Draw: 28
- Seeds: 8

Events
Singles	Doubles
← 2019 ·	Korea Open	· 2022 →

Karolína Muchová was the reigning champion, but chose not to participate.

Zhu Lin won her first WTA 125 tournament, defeating Kristina Mladenovic in the final, 6–0, 6–4.

== Seeds ==
1. (France) Kristina Mladenovic (final)
2. (China) Zhu Lin (champion)
3. (Hungary) Réka Luca Jani (second round)
4. (Greece) Valentini Grammatikopoulou (second round)
5. (Netherlands) Arianne Hartono (quarterfinals)
6. (South Korea) Jang Su-jeong (second round)
7. (Bulgaria) Isabella Shinikova (quarterfinals)
8. (Japan) Yuki Naito (quarterfinals)

== Draw ==
=== Key ===
- Q = Qualifier
- WC = Wild card
- LL = Lucky loser
- Alt = Alternate
- SE = Special exempt
- PR = Protected ranking
- ITF = ITF entry
- JE = Junior exempt
- w/o = Walkover
- r = Retired
- d = Defaulted
- SR = Special ranking

=== Finals ===
Semifinals
1	(France) Kristina Mladenovic	3	7	7^{7}
(Russia) Ekaterina Kazionova	6	5	6^{4}
(Finland) Anastasia Kulikova	1	6^{6}
2	(China) Zhu Lin	6	7^{8}

Final
1	(France) Kristina Mladenovic	0	4
2	(China) Zhu Lin	6	6

=== Top half ===
First round
(South Korea) J-y Seo	1	1
(South Korea) N-l Han	6	6
Alt	(South Korea) J Moon	0	1
WC	(Czech Republic) B Fruhvirtová	6	6
WC	(South Korea) E-y Park	1	4
8	(Japan) Y Naito	6	6
(South Korea) D-b Kim	2	3
(Russia) E Kazionova	6	6
(Mexico) F Contreras	3	1
(Czech Republic) L Fruhvirtová	6	6
WC	(South Korea) D-y Back	6	3	3
6	(South Korea) S-j Jang	3	6	6

Second round
1	(France) K Mladenovic	6	5	6
(South Korea) N-l Han	4	7	0
WC	(Czech Republic) B Fruhvirtová	4	2
8	(Japan) Y Naito	6	6
3	(Hungary) RL Jani	5	2
(Russia) E Kazionova	7	6
(Czech Republic) L Fruhvirtová	7	6
6	(South Korea) S-j Jang	5	3

Quarterfinals
1	(France) K Mladenovic	5	6	6
8	(Japan) Y Naito	7	2	4
(Russia) E Kazionova	6	5	7^{7}
(Czech Republic) L Fruhvirtová	3	7	6^{4}

Semifinals
1	(France) K Mladenovic	3	7	7^{7}
(Russia) E Kazionova	6	5	6^{4}

=== Bottom half ===
First round
5	(Netherlands) A Hartono	6	6
(Canada) C Zhao	2	3
(South Korea) O-y Choi	3	6	6^{4}
(South Korea) J-h Choi	6	4	7^{7}
(Finland) A Kulikova	6	6
(India) R Bhatia	0	2
7	(Bulgaria) I Shinikova	6	6
(South Korea) Y-w Jeong	4	1
(Australia) O Tjandramulia	3	2
WC	(South Korea) B-y Jeong	6	6
(Thailand) P Plipuech	1	6	6
(South Korea) E-h Lee	6	3	4

Second round
5	(Netherlands) A Hartono	6	6
(South Korea) J-h Choi	1	1
(Finland) A Kulikova	6	6
4	(Greece) V Grammatikopoulou	1	2
7	(Bulgaria) I Shinikova	6	6
WC	(South Korea) B-y Jeong	1	0
(Thailand) P Plipuech	1	1
2	(China) L Zhu	6	6

Quarterfinals
5	(Netherlands) A Hartono	2	4
(Finland) A Kulikova	6	6
7	(Bulgaria) I Shinikova	3	0
2	(China) L Zhu	6	6

Semifinals
(Finland) A Kulikova	1	6^{6}
2	(China) L Zhu	6	7^{8}
