= 2019 Korea Open (tennis) =

- Date: 16–22 September
- Edition: 16th
- Category: WTA International
- Draw: 32S / 16D
- Prize money: $250,000
- Surface: Hard
- Location: Seoul, South Korea
- Venue: Seoul Olympic Park Tennis Center

Champions

Singles
- (Czech Republic) Karolína Muchová

Doubles
- (Spain) Lara Arruabarrena / (Germany) Tatjana Maria
← 2018 ·	Korea Open	· 2021 →

The 2019 Korea Open (also known as the 2019 KEB Hana Bank Korea Open for sponsorship purposes) was a professional women's tennis tournament played on outdoor hard courts. It was the 16th edition of the tournament, and part of the 2019 WTA Tour. It took place in Seoul, South Korea between 16 and 22 September 2019.

== Finals ==
=== Singles ===
- (Czech Republic) Karolína Muchová defeated (Poland) Magda Linette, 6–1, 6–1

=== Doubles ===
- (Spain) Lara Arruabarrena / (Germany) Tatjana Maria defeated (United States) Hayley Carter / (Brazil) Luisa Stefani, 7–6^{(9–7)}, 3–6, [10–7]

== Points and prize money ==
=== Point distribution ===
Event	W	F	SF	QF	Round of 16	Round of 32	Q	Q2	Q1
Singles	280	180	110	60	30	1	18	12	1
Doubles	280	180	110	60	1	—	—	—	—

=== Prize money ===
Event	W	F	SF	QF	Round of 16	Round of 32	Q2	Q1
Singles	$43,000	$21,400	$11,500	$6,175	$3,400	$2,100	$1,020	$600
Doubles *	$12,300	$6,400	$3,435	$1,820	$960	—	—	—

_{* per team}

== Singles main-draw entrants ==
=== Seeds ===
Country	Player	Rank^{1}	Seed
~~GRE~~	~~Maria Sakkari~~	~~28~~	~~1~~
RUS	Ekaterina Alexandrova	39	2
CZE	Karolína Muchová	43	3
POL	Magda Linette	45	4
AUS	Ajla Tomljanović	46	5
SLO	Polona Hercog	53	6
RUS	Margarita Gasparyan	54	7
CHN	Wang Yafan	55	8

- ^{1} Rankings are as of September 9, 2019

=== Other entrants ===
The following players received wildcards into the singles main draw:

- (United States) Kristie Ahn
- (South Korea) Choi Ji-hee
- (South Korea) Han Na-lae

The following player received entry using a protected ranking into the singles main draw:

- (Czech Republic) Denisa Allertová

The following player received entry as a special exempt into the singles main draw:

- (Romania) Mihaela Buzărnescu

The following players received entry from the qualifying draw:

- (Hungary) Tímea Babos
- (Romania) Ana Bogdan
- (Australia) Priscilla Hon
- (United States) Danielle Lao
- (Belgium) Greet Minnen
- (Romania) Patricia Maria Țig

The following player received entry into the main draw as a lucky loser:

- (Montenegro) Danka Kovinić

=== Withdrawals ===
- (Australia) Daria Gavrilova → replaced by (Belgium) Kirsten Flipkens
- (Serbia) Ivana Jorović → replaced by (Switzerland) Stefanie Vögele
- (Slovakia) Viktória Kužmová → replaced by (Czech Republic) Denisa Allertová
- (Greece) Maria Sakkari → replaced by (Montenegro) Danka Kovinić

== Doubles main-draw entrants ==
=== Seeds ===
Country	Player	Country	Player	Rank^{1}	Seed
BEL	Kirsten Flipkens	LAT	Jeļena Ostapenko	51	1
SWE	Cornelia Lister	CZE	Renata Voráčová	131	2
ROU	Irina-Camelia Begu	RUS	Margarita Gasparyan	149	3
GEO	Oksana Kalashnikova	MNE	Danka Kovinić	180	4

- ^{1} Rankings are as of September 9, 2019

=== Other entrants ===
The following pairs received wildcards into the doubles main draw:

- (South Korea) Jang Su-jeong / (South Korea) Kim Na-ri
- (South Korea) Kim Da-bin / (South Korea) Park So-hyun

=== Withdrawals ===
Before the tournament

- (Russia) Anastasia Potapova (right ankle injury)

During the tournament

- (Czech Republic) Karolína Plíšková (right thigh injury)
