= 2021 Korea Open – Doubles =

Doubles
- 2021 Korea Open

Final
- Champions: (South Korea) Choi Ji-hee (South Korea) Han Na-lae
- Runners-up: (Greece) Valentini Grammatikopoulou (Hungary) Réka Luca Jani
- Score: 6–4, 6–4

Details
- Draw: 8
- Seeds: 2

Events
Singles	Doubles
← 2019 ·	Korea Open	· 2022 →

Lara Arruabarrena and Tatjana Maria were the reigning champions, but chose not to participate.

Choi Ji-hee and Han Na-lae won the title, defeating Valentini Grammatikopoulou and Réka Luca Jani in the final, 6–4, 6–4.

== Seeds ==
1. (Netherlands) Arianne Hartono / (Australia) Olivia Tjandramulia (quarterfinals)
2. (Greece) Valentini Grammatikopoulou / (Hungary) Réka Luca Jani (final)

== Draw ==
=== Key ===
- Q = Qualifier
- WC = Wild card
- LL = Lucky loser
- Alt = Alternate
- SE = Special exempt
- PR = Protected ranking
- ITF = ITF entry
- JE = Junior exempt
- w/o = Walkover
- r = Retired
- d = Defaulted
- SR = Special ranking

=== Draw ===
Quarterfinals
1	(Netherlands) A Hartono (Australia) O Tjandramulia	2	4
(South Korea) J-h Choi (South Korea) N-l Han	6	6
(South Korea) S-j Jang (Bulgaria) I Shinikova	7	6
(India) R Bhatia (Finland) A Kulikova	5	0
(Mexico) F Contreras (Japan) Y Naito	7	4	[10]
WC	(South Korea) B-y Jeong (South Korea) Y-w Jeong	5	6	[6]
(Thailand) P Plipuech (China) L Zhu	1	4
2	(Greece) V Grammatikopoulou (Hungary) RL Jani	6	6

Semifinals
(South Korea) J-h Choi (South Korea) N-l Han	6	6
(South Korea) S-j Jang (Bulgaria) I Shinikova	0	2
(Mexico) F Contreras (Japan) Y Naito	2	6	[4]
2	(Greece) V Grammatikopoulou (Hungary) RL Jani	6	1	[10]

Final
(South Korea) J-h Choi (South Korea) N-l Han	6	6
2	(Greece) V Grammatikopoulou (Hungary) RL Jani	4	4
