= 2021 Montevideo Open – Singles =

Singles
- 2021 Montevideo Open

Final
- Champion: (France) Diane Parry
- Runner-up: (Hungary) Panna Udvardy
- Score: 6–3, 6–2

Events
Singles	Doubles
- Montevideo Open

This was the first edition of the women's event.

Diane Parry won the title, defeating Panna Udvardy in the final, 6–3, 6–2.

== Seeds ==
1. (Brazil) Beatriz Haddad Maia (first round)
2. (Hungary) Anna Bondár (first round)
3. (Hungary) Panna Udvardy (final)
4. (Romania) Irina Bara (second round)
5. (France) Diane Parry (champion)
6. (Georgia (country)) Ekaterine Gorgodze (semifinals)
7. (Argentina) Paula Ormaechea (second round)
8. (Brazil) Laura Pigossi (quarterfinals)

== Draw ==
Key

- Q = Qualifier
- WC = Wild card
- LL = Lucky loser
- Alt = Alternate
- ITF = ITF entry
- PR = Protected ranking
- SR = Special ranking
- SE = Special exempt
- JE = Junior exempt
- JR = Junior Accelerator Programme entrant
- CO = College Accelerator Programme entrant
- NG = Next Gen Accelerator Program entrant
- w/o = Walkover
- r = Retired
- d = Defaulted

=== Finals ===
Semifinals
(Andorra) Victoria Jiménez Kasintseva	7	1	2
3	(Hungary) Panna Udvardy	5	6	6
6	(Georgia (country)) Ekaterine Gorgodze	2	2
5	(France) Diane Parry	6	6

Final
3	(Hungary) Panna Udvardy	3	2
5	(France) Diane Parry	6	6

=== Top half ===
First round
1	(Brazil) B Haddad Maia	3	4
(Andorra) V Jiménez Kasintseva	6	6
WC	(Uruguay) G Grant	6^{10}	2
(Argentina) ML Carlé	7^{12}	6
(Colombia) E Arango	6	6
Q	(United States) Dasha Ivanova	4	3
(Romania) G Lee	0	4
7	(Argentina) P Ormaechea	6	6
3	(Hungary) P Udvardy	6	6
Q	(Australia) O Tjandramulia	1	3
(Brazil) C Alves	6	6
(Argentina) V Bosio	4	0
(Canada) C Zhao	2	6	6
(Ukraine) V Strakhova	6	3	0
(Chile) B Gatica	1	6	5
8	(Brazil) L Pigossi	6	3	7

Second round
(Andorra) V Jiménez Kasintseva	7^{12}	5	7
(Argentina) ML Carlé	6^{10}	7	5
(Colombia) E Arango	6	6
7	(Argentina) P Ormaechea	4	1
3	(Hungary) P Udvardy	6	6
(Brazil) C Alves	3	4
(Canada) C Zhao	1	4
8	(Brazil) L Pigossi	6	6

Quarterfinals
(Andorra) V Jiménez Kasintseva	7	6
(Colombia) E Arango	5	2
3	(Hungary) P Udvardy	6	6
8	(Brazil) L Pigossi	2	3

Semifinals
(Andorra) V Jiménez Kasintseva	7	1	2
3	(Hungary) P Udvardy	5	6	6

=== Bottom half ===
First round
6	(Georgia (country)) E Gorgodze	6	6
Q	(Argentina) Marina Bulbarella	0	1
(Spain) M Bassols Ribera	6	3	6
(Mexico) AS Sánchez	1	6	2
Q	(Argentina) M Capurro Taborda	2	4
(China) X You	6	6
(Germany) K Gerlach	6	1	1
4	(Romania) I Bara	3	6	6
5	(France) D Parry	6	6
(Czech Republic) A Sisková	2	2
(Russia) E Avanesyan	6^{4}	0
(Paraguay) V Cepede Royg	7^{7}	6
WC	(Spain) A Mintegi del Olmo	6	6
(India) R Bhatia	2	2
(Netherlands) A Hartono	6	4	6
2	(Hungary) A Bondár	4	6	4

Second round
6	(Georgia (country)) E Gorgodze	6	7^{7}
(Spain) M Bassols Ribera	3	6^{5}
(China) X You	6	6
4	(Romania) I Bara	2	4
5	(France) D Parry	6	6
(Paraguay) V Cepede Royg	3	1
WC	(Spain) A Mintegi del Olmo	6	6
(Netherlands) A Hartono	0	2

Quarterfinals
6	(Georgia (country)) E Gorgodze	6	6
(China) X You	1	3
5	(France) D Parry	6	6
WC	(Spain) A Mintegi del Olmo	3	1

Semifinals
6	(Georgia (country)) E Gorgodze	2	2
5	(France) D Parry	6	6

== Qualifying ==
=== Seeds ===
1. (Australia) Olivia Tjandramulia (qualified)
2. (United States) Dasha Ivanova (qualified)
3. (Germany) Jasmin Jebawy (qualifying competition)
4. (Argentina) Martina Capurro Taborda (qualified)

=== Qualifiers ===
1. (Australia) Olivia Tjandramulia
2. (United States) Dasha Ivanova
3. (Argentina) Marina Bulbarella
4. (Argentina) Martina Capurro Taborda

=== Draw ===
==== First qualifier ====
Qualifying competition
1	(Australia) Olivia Tjandramulia	5	6	6
	(Argentina) Julieta Estable	7	4	3

==== Second qualifier ====
Qualifying competition
2	(United States) Dasha Ivanova	6	6
	(Brazil) Rebeca Pereira	1	3

==== Third qualifier ====
Qualifying competition
3	(Germany) Jasmin Jebawy	3	5
WC	(Argentina) Marina Bulbarella	6	7

==== Fourth qualifier ====
Qualifying competition
4	(Argentina) Martina Capurro Taborda	6	6
WC	(Uruguay) Juliana Rodríguez	0	0
