= 2019 Karlsruhe Open =

- Date: 29 July – 4 August
- Edition: 1st
- Category: WTA 125K series
- Draw: 32S / 8D
- Prize money: $125,000
- Surface: Clay
- Location: Karlsruhe, Germany
- Venue: TC Rüppurr

Champions

Singles
- (Romania) Patricia Maria Țig

Doubles
- (Spain) Lara Arruabarrena / (Czech Republic) Renata Voráčová
Karlsruhe Open	· 2021 →

The 2019 Karlsruhe Open (also known as the Liqui Moly Open Karlsruhe for sponsorship reasons) was a professional tennis tournament played on outdoor clay courts. It was the 1st edition of the tournament and part of the 2019 WTA 125K series, offering a total of $125,000 in prize money. It took place in Karlsruhe, Germany between 29 July and 4 August 2019.

== Singles main draw entrants ==
=== Seeds ===
Country	Player	Rank^{1}	Seed
SLO	Tamara Zidanšek	55	1
BEL	Alison Van Uytvanck	65	2
GER	Tatjana Maria	70	3
GER	Laura Siegemund	71	4
AUS	Daria Gavrilova	85	5
ROU	Sorana Cîrstea	94	6
ROU	Irina-Camelia Begu	98	7
SUI	Stefanie Vögele	112	8

- ^{1} Rankings as of 22 July 2019.

=== Other entrants ===
The following players received a wildcard into the singles main draw:

- (Germany) Katharina Hobgarski
- (Germany) Sabine Lisicki
- (Germany) Jule Niemeier

The following players qualified into the singles main draw:

- (Romania) Laura Ioana Paar
- (Germany) Stephanie Wagner
- (China) Yuan Yue
- (Czech Republic) Renata Voráčová

The following player received entry into the main draw as a lucky loser:

- (Germany) Liana Cammilleri

=== Withdrawals ===
Before the tournament

- (Romania) Ana Bogdan → replaced by (Romania) Elena-Gabriela Ruse
- (Germany) Mona Barthel → replaced by (Georgia (country)) Ekaterine Gorgodze
- (Germany) Anna-Lena Friedsam → replaced by (Germany) Liana Cammilleri
- (Slovakia) Kristína Kučová → replaced by (Romania) Patricia Maria Țig
- (Luxembourg) Mandy Minella → replaced by (Netherlands) Bibiane Schoofs
- (Russia) Natalia Vikhlyantseva → replaced by (China) Han Xinyun

=== Retirements ===
- (Romania) Irina-Camelia Begu (left thigh injury)
- (Czech Republic) Tereza Martincová (right thigh injury)
- (Slovenia) Tamara Zidanšek (left knee injury)

== Doubles entrants ==
=== Seeds ===
Country	Player	Country	Player	Rank^{1}	Seed
ESP	Lara Arruabarrena	CZE	Renata Voráčová	149	1
RUS	Natela Dzalamidze	RUS	Yana Sizikova	188	2
BEL	Greet Minnen	BEL	Alison Van Uytvanck	254	3
ROU	Jaqueline Cristian	ROU	Elena-Gabriela Ruse	318	4

- ^{1} Rankings as of 22 July 2019.

=== Other entrants ===
The following pair received a wildcard into the doubles main draw:

- (Germany) Sabine Lisicki / (Netherlands) Bibiane Schoofs

== Champions ==
=== Singles ===
- (Romania) Patricia Maria Țig def. (Belgium) Alison Van Uytvanck 3–6, 6–1, 6–2

=== Doubles ===
- (Spain) Lara Arruabarrena / (Czech Republic) Renata Voráčová def. (China) Han Xinyun / (China) Yuan Yue 6–7^{(2–7)}, 6–4, [10–4]
