= 2021 Montevideo Open – Doubles =

Doubles
- 2021 Montevideo Open

Final
- Champions: (Romania) Irina Bara (Georgia (country)) Ekaterine Gorgodze
- Runners-up: (Brazil) Carolina Alves (Spain) Marina Bassols Ribera
- Score: 6–4, 6–3

Events
Singles	Doubles
- Montevideo Open

This was the first edition of the women's event.

Irina Bara and Ekaterine Gorgodze won the title, defeating Carolina Alves and Marina Bassols Ribera in the final, 6–4, 6–3.

== Seeds ==
1. (Romania) Irina Bara / (Georgia (country)) Ekaterine Gorgodze (champions)
2. (Netherlands) Arianne Hartono / (Australia) Olivia Tjandramulia (quarterfinals)
3. (Hungary) Anna Bondár / (Hungary) Panna Udvardy (quarterfinals)
4. (Argentina) María Lourdes Carlé / (Brazil) Laura Pigossi (semifinals)

== Draw ==
Key

- Q = Qualifier
- WC = Wild card
- LL = Lucky loser
- Alt = Alternate
- ITF = ITF entry
- PR = Protected ranking
- SR = Special ranking
- SE = Special exempt
- JE = Junior exempt
- JR = Junior Accelerator Programme entrant
- CO = College Accelerator Programme entrant
- NG = Next Gen Accelerator Program entrant
- w/o = Walkover
- r = Retired
- d = Defaulted

=== Draw ===
First round
(China) X You (Canada) C Zhao	6	6
(Romania) G Lee (Mexico) AS Sánchez	2	4
(India) R Bhatia (United States) D Ivanova	2	6	[12]
(Czech Republic) A Sisková (Ukraine) V Strakhova	6	4	[14]
(Brazil) C Alves (Spain) M Bassols Ribera	6	7
WC	(Uruguay) G Grant (Uruguay) J Rodríguez	0	5
(Russia) E Avanesyan (Argentina) V Bosio	0	6	[10]
(Chile) B Gatica (Brazil) R Pereira	6	3	[8]

Quarterfinals
1	(Romania) I Bara (Georgia (country)) E Gorgodze	4	6	[10]
(China) X You (Canada) C Zhao	6	4	[5]
4	(Argentina) ML Carlé (Brazil) L Pigossi	7^{7}	6
(Czech Republic) A Sisková (Ukraine) V Strakhova	6^{3}	4
(Brazil) C Alves (Spain) M Bassols Ribera	6^{4}	7	[10]
3	(Hungary) A Bondár (Hungary) P Udvardy	7^{7}	5	[5]
(Russia) E Avanesyan (Argentina) V Bosio	6	6
2	(Netherlands) A Hartono (Australia) O Tjandramulia	2	2

Semifinals
1	(Romania) I Bara (Georgia (country)) E Gorgodze	6	7
4	(Argentina) ML Carlé (Brazil) L Pigossi	2	5
(Brazil) C Alves (Spain) M Bassols Ribera	3	6	[10]
(Russia) E Avanesyan (Argentina) V Bosio	6	4	[7]

Final
1	(Romania) I Bara (Georgia (country)) E Gorgodze	6	6
(Brazil) C Alves (Spain) M Bassols Ribera	4	3
