= 2019 Korea Open – Doubles =

Doubles
- 2019 Korea Open

Final
- Champions: (Spain) Lara Arruabarrena (Germany) Tatjana Maria
- Runners-up: (United States) Hayley Carter (Brazil) Luisa Stefani
- Score: 7–6^{(9–7)}, 3–6, [10–7]

Events
Singles	Doubles
← 2018 ·	Korea Open	· 2021 →

Choi Ji-hee and Han Na-lae were the defending champions, but lost in the quarterfinals to Laura Pigossi and Wang Yafan.

Lara Arruabarrena and Tatjana Maria won the title, defeating Hayley Carter and Luisa Stefani in the final, 7–6^{(9–7)}, 3–6, [10–7].

== Seeds ==
1. (Belgium) Kirsten Flipkens / (Latvia) Jeļena Ostapenko (first round)
2. (Sweden) Cornelia Lister / (Czech Republic) Renata Voráčová (quarterfinals)
3. (Romania) Irina-Camelia Begu / (Russia) Margarita Gasparyan (quarterfinals)
4. (Georgia (country)) Oksana Kalashnikova / (Montenegro) Danka Kovinić (first round)

== Draw ==
=== Key ===
- Q = Qualifier
- WC = Wild card
- LL = Lucky loser
- Alt = Alternate
- SE = Special exempt
- PR = Protected ranking
- ITF = ITF entry
- JE = Junior exempt
- w/o = Walkover
- r = Retired
- d = Defaulted
- SR = Special ranking

=== Draw ===
First round
1	(Belgium) K Flipkens (Latvia) J Ostapenko	3	6	[9]
(United States) H Carter (Brazil) L Stefani	6	4	[11]
(Belgium) G Minnen (Belgium) A Van Uytvanck	6	6
(Kazakhstan) A Danilina (Norway) U Eikeri	3	1
4	(Georgia (country)) O Kalashnikova (Montenegro) D Kovinić	6	4	[6]
(Brazil) L Pigossi (China) Y Wang	3	6	[10]
(South Korea) J-h Choi (South Korea) N-l Han	w/o
(Russia) A Potapova (Russia) Y Sizikova
(Russia) V Savinykh (United Kingdom) E Silva	1	2
(Czech Republic) Ka Plíšková (Czech Republic) Kr Plíšková	6	6
WC	(South Korea) S-j Jang (South Korea) N-r Kim	6^{2}	6	[2]
3	(Romania) I-C Begu (Russia) M Gasparyan	7^{7}	4	[10]
(Switzerland) T Bacsinszky (United States) I Neel	1	3
(Spain) L Arruabarrena (Germany) T Maria	6	6
WC	(South Korea) D-b Kim (South Korea) S-h Park	4	6^{7}
2	(Sweden) C Lister (Czech Republic) R Voráčová	6	7^{9}

Quarterfinals
(United States) H Carter (Brazil) L Stefani	6	5	[12]
(Belgium) G Minnen (Belgium) A Van Uytvanck	3	7	[10]
(Brazil) L Pigossi (China) Y Wang	6	6
(South Korea) J-h Choi (South Korea) N-l Han	3	3
(Czech Republic) Ka Plíšková (Czech Republic) Kr Plíšková	6	6
3	(Romania) I-C Begu (Russia) M Gasparyan	3	3
(Spain) L Arruabarrena (Germany) T Maria	6	6
2	(Sweden) C Lister (Czech Republic) R Voráčová	2	3

Semifinals
(United States) H Carter (Brazil) L Stefani	6	6
(Brazil) L Pigossi (China) Y Wang	0	2
(Czech Republic) Ka Plíšková (Czech Republic) Kr Plíšková
(Spain) L Arruabarrena (Germany) T Maria	w/o

Final
(United States) H Carter (Brazil) L Stefani	6^{7}	6	[7]
(Spain) L Arruabarrena (Germany) T Maria	7^{9}	3	[10]
