= Karlsruhe Open =

Defunct tennis tournament
- Event name: Liqui Moly Open Karlsruhe
- Tour: WTA Tour
- Founded: 2019
- Abolished: 2022
- Location: Karlsruhe; Germany
- Category: WTA 125 tournaments
- Surface: Clay - outdoors
- Draw: 32S / 8D
- Prize money: US$115,000 (2022)

Current champions (2022)
- Women's singles: (Egypt) Mayar Sherif
- Women's doubles: (Egypt) Mayar Sherif (Hungary) Panna Udvardy

The Karlsruhe Open is a WTA 125-level professional women's tennis tournament. It takes place on outdoor clay courts, around the months of July and August at the Tennis Club Rüppurr in the city of Karlsruhe in Germany. The prize money is $115,000.

== Results ==
=== Singles ===
Year	Champion	Runner-up	Score
2019	(Romania) Patricia Maria Țig	(Belgium) Alison Van Uytvanck	3–6, 6–1, 6–2
2020	Cancelled due to the COVID-19 pandemic		
2021	(Egypt) Mayar Sherif	(Italy) Martina Trevisan	6–3, 6–2
2022	(Egypt) Mayar Sherif (2)	(United States) Bernarda Pera	6–2, 6–4

=== Doubles ===
Year	Champions	Runners-up	Score
2019	(Spain) Lara Arruabarrena (Czech Republic) Renata Voráčová	(China) Han Xinyun (China) Yuan Yue	6–7^{(2–7)}, 6–4, [10–4]
2020	Cancelled due to the COVID-19 pandemic		
2021	(Romania) Irina Bara (Georgia (country)) Ekaterine Gorgodze	(Poland) Katarzyna Piter (Egypt) Mayar Sherif	6–3, 2–6, [10–7]
2022	(Egypt) Mayar Sherif (Hungary) Panna Udvardy	Yana Sizikova (Belgium) Alison Van Uytvanck	5–7, 6–4, [10–2]
