= 2019 Korea Open – Singles =

Singles
- 2019 Korea Open

Final
- Champion: (Czech Republic) Karolína Muchová
- Runner-up: (Poland) Magda Linette
- Score: 6–1, 6–1

Details
- Draw: 32
- Seeds: 8

Events
| Singles | Doubles |
- Korea Open

Karolína Muchová defeated Magda Linette in the final, 6–1, 6–1 to win the singles title at the 2019 Korea Open. It was her first WTA Tour title.

Kiki Bertens was the reigning champion, but chose to compete in Osaka instead.

== Seeds ==
1. (Greece) Maria Sakkari (withdrew)
2. (Russia) Ekaterina Alexandrova (semifinals)
3. (Czech Republic) Karolína Muchová (champion)
4. (Poland) Magda Linette (final)
5. (Australia) Ajla Tomljanović (second round)
6. (Slovenia) Polona Hercog (first round)
7. (Russia) Margarita Gasparyan (second round)
8. (China) Wang Yafan (semifinals)

== Draw ==
Key

- Q = Qualifier
- WC = Wild card
- LL = Lucky loser
- Alt = Alternate
- ITF = ITF entry
- PR = Protected ranking
- SR = Special ranking
- SE = Special exempt
- JE = Junior exempt
- JR = Junior Accelerator Programme entrant
- CO = College Accelerator Programme entrant
- NG = Next Gen Accelerator Program entrant
- w/o = Walkover
- r = Retired
- d = Defaulted

=== Finals ===
Semifinals
8 | (China) Wang Yafan | 6^{5} | 4
3 | (Czech Republic) Karolína Muchová | 7^{7} | 6
4 | (Poland) Magda Linette | 7^{7} | 7^{9}
2 | (Russia) Ekaterina Alexandrova | 6^{5} | 6^{7}

Final
3 | (Czech Republic) Karolína Muchová | 6 | 6
4 | (Poland) Magda Linette | 1 | 1

=== Top half ===
First round
LL | (Montenegro) D Kovinić | 4 | 6 | 6^{3}
Q | (Romania) PM Țig | 6 | 3 | 7^{7}
(Spain) P Badosa | 6 | 6
(Switzerland) J Teichmann | 4 | 4
(Belgium) Y Bonaventure | 5 | 6 | 6
(United States) J Pegula | 7 | 2 | 4
Q | (United States) D Lao | 4 | 6^{2}
8 | (China) Y Wang | 6 | 7^{7}
3 | (Czech Republic) K Muchová | 6 | 3 | 6
(Belgium) A Van Uytvanck | 4 | 6 | 2
Q | (Hungary) T Babos | 6 | 6
(Latvia) J Ostapenko | 3 | 3
Q | (Australia) P Hon | 6 | 6
SE | (Romania) M Buzărnescu | 3 | 4
(Switzerland) S Vögele | 0 | 2
5 | (Australia) A Tomljanović | 6 | 6

Second round
Q | (Romania) PM Țig | 4 | 2
(Spain) P Badosa | 6 | 6
(Belgium) Y Bonaventure | 6 | 3 | 0
8 | (China) Y Wang | 4 | 6 | 6
3 | (Czech Republic) K Muchová | 6 | 6
Q | (Hungary) T Babos | 2 | 3
Q | (Australia) P Hon | 6 | 5 | 6
5 | (Australia) A Tomljanović | 3 | 7 | 1

Quarterfinals
(Spain) P Badosa | 1 | 3
8 | (China) Y Wang | 6 | 6
3 | (Czech Republic) K Muchová | 6 | 6
Q | (Australia) P Hon | 3 | 3

Semifinals
8 | (China) Y Wang | 6^{5} | 4
3 | (Czech Republic) K Muchová | 7^{7} | 6

=== Bottom half ===
First round
7 | (Russia) M Gasparyan | 7 | 6
(Germany) T Maria | 5 | 4
PR | (Czech Republic) D Allertová | 2 | 5
(Belgium) K Flipkens | 6 | 7
(Russia) A Potapova | 7^{7} | 6
WC | (South Korea) N-l Han | 6^{4} | 1
(Romania) I-C Begu | 1 | 4
4 | (Poland) M Linette | 6 | 6
6 | (Slovenia) P Hercog | 3 | 6 | 1
Q | (Romania) A Bogdan | 6 | 3 | 6
WC | (United States) K Ahn | 6 | 6
(Switzerland) T Bacsinszky | 0 | 0
WC | (South Korea) J-h Choi | 1 | 4
(Czech Republic) Kr Plíšková | 6 | 6
Q | (Belgium) G Minnen | 4 | 3
2 | (Russia) E Alexandrova | 6 | 6

Second round
7 | (Russia) M Gasparyan | 3 | 5
(Belgium) K Flipkens | 6 | 7
(Russia) A Potapova | 5 | 6^{4}
4 | (Poland) M Linette | 7 | 7^{7}
Q | (Romania) A Bogdan | 6 | 4 | 6^{2}
WC | (United States) K Ahn | 0 | 6 | 7^{7}
(Czech Republic) Kr Plíšková | 6 | 3 | 4
2 | (Russia) E Alexandrova | 3 | 6 | 6

Quarterfinals
(Belgium) K Flipkens | 2 | 3
4 | (Poland) M Linette | 6 | 6
WC | (United States) K Ahn | 7^{7} | 4 | 4
2 | (Russia) E Alexandrova | 6^{0} | 6 | 6

Semifinals
4 | (Poland) M Linette | 7^{7} | 7^{9}
2 | (Russia) E Alexandrova | 6^{5} | 6^{7}

== Qualifying ==
=== Seeds ===
1. (Hungary) Tímea Babos (qualified)
2. (Montenegro) Danka Kovinić (qualifying competition, lucky loser)
3. (Belgium) Greet Minnen (qualified)
4. (Australia) Priscilla Hon (qualified)
5. (Romania) Patricia Maria Țig (qualified)
6. (Romania) Ana Bogdan (qualified)
7. (Spain) Lara Arruabarrena (qualifying competition)
8. (United States) Danielle Lao (qualified)
9. (Australia) Destanee Aiava (qualifying competition)
10. (Romania) Jaqueline Cristian (qualifying competition)
11. (Norway) Ulrikke Eikeri (qualifying competition)
12. (China) You Xiaodi (first round)

=== Qualifiers ===
1. (Hungary) Tímea Babos
2. (United States) Danielle Lao
3. (Belgium) Greet Minnen
4. (Australia) Priscilla Hon
5. (Romania) Patricia Maria Țig
6. (Romania) Ana Bogdan

=== Lucky loser ===
1. (Montenegro) Danka Kovinić

=== Draw ===
==== First qualifier ====
First round
1 | (Hungary) Tímea Babos | 6 | 6
WC | (South Korea) Shin Ji-ho | 1 | 1
WC | (South Korea) Jeong Yeong-won | 1 | 0
10 | (Romania) Jaqueline Cristian | 6 | 6

Qualifying competition
1 | (Hungary) Tímea Babos | 6 | 6
10 | (Romania) Jaqueline Cristian | 2 | 2

==== Second qualifier ====
First round
2 | (Montenegro) Danka Kovinić | 6 | 6
(Romania) Alexandra Cadanțu | 1 | 2
PR | (Sweden) Susanne Celik | 3 | 5
8 | (United States) Danielle Lao | 6 | 7

Qualifying competition
2 | (Montenegro) Danka Kovinić | 3 | 3
8 | (United States) Danielle Lao | 6 | 6

==== Third qualifier ====
First round
3 | (Belgium) Greet Minnen | 4 | 6 | 6
(Croatia) Jana Fett | 6 | 2 | 1
WC | (South Korea) Park So-hyun | 7 | 6
12 | (China) You Xiaodi | 5 | 3

Qualifying competition
3 | (Belgium) Greet Minnen | 6 | 6
WC | (South Korea) Park So-hyun | 2 | 2

==== Fourth qualifier ====
First round
4 | (Australia) Priscilla Hon | 6 | 6
WC | (South Korea) Ahn Yu-jin | 3 | 1
(Poland) Urszula Radwańska | 6 | 6^{9} | 1
9 | (Australia) Destanee Aiava | 1 | 7^{11} | 6

Qualifying competition
4 | (Australia) Priscilla Hon | 7^{7} | 6
9 | (Australia) Destanee Aiava | 6^{3} | 2

==== Fifth qualifier ====
First round
5 | (Romania) Patricia Maria Țig | 6 | 6
(United Kingdom) Samantha Murray | 4 | 2
(South Korea) Jang Su-jeong | 2 | 2
11 | (Norway) Ulrikke Eikeri | 6 | 6

Qualifying competition
5 | (Romania) Patricia Maria Țig | 6 | 6
11 | (Norway) Ulrikke Eikeri | 0 | 2

==== Sixth qualifier ====
First round
6 | (Romania) Ana Bogdan | 6 | 6
(South Korea) Kim Da-bin | 1 | 0
(United Kingdom) Naiktha Bains | 0 | 3
7 | (Spain) Lara Arruabarrena | 6 | 6

Qualifying competition
6 | (Romania) Ana Bogdan | 6 | 6
7 | (Spain) Lara Arruabarrena | 3 | 2
