= 2023 Korea Open (tennis) =

- Date: 9–15 October 2023
- Edition: 19th
- Category: WTA 250
- Draw: 32S / 16D
- Prize money: $259,303
- Surface: Hard, outdoor
- Location: Seoul, South Korea
- Venue: Seoul Olympic Park Tennis Center

Champions

Singles
- (United States) Jessica Pegula

Doubles
- (Czech Republic) Marie Bouzková / (United States) Bethanie Mattek-Sands
- Korea Open (tennis)

The 2023 Hana Bank Korea Open (sponsored by Hana Bank) was a tennis tournament played on outdoor hard courts. It was the 19th edition of the tournament and a WTA 250 event on the 2023 WTA Tour. The tournament took place at the Olympic Park Tennis Center in Seoul, South Korea from 9 to 15 October 2023. The men's event was discontinued this year following the return of the ATP Tour to China.

== Finals ==
=== Singles ===
- (United States) Jessica Pegula defeated (China) Yuan Yue 6–2, 6–3

=== Doubles ===
- (Czech Republic) Marie Bouzková / (United States) Bethanie Mattek-Sands defeated (Thailand) Luksika Kumkhum / (Thailand) Peangtarn Plipuech 6–2, 6–1

== Singles main draw entrants ==
=== Seeds ===
Country	Player	Rank	Seeds
USA	Jessica Pegula	4	1
LAT	Jeļena Ostapenko	17	2
	Ekaterina Alexandrova	20	3
CZE	Marie Bouzková	30	4
USA	Sofia Kenin	31	5
USA	Alycia Parks	43	6
NED	Arantxa Rus	51	7
GBR	Katie Boulter	56	8

- Rankings are as of 2 October 2023.

=== Other entrants ===
The following players received wildcards into the singles main draw:

- (South Korea) Back Da-yeon
- (South Korea) Han Na-lae
- (United States) Jessica Pegula

The following players received entry from the qualifying draw:

- (Netherlands) Arianne Hartono
- (Chinese Taipei) Liang En-shuo
- (United States) Sachia Vickery
- (South Korea) Ku Yeon-woo

The following player received entry as a lucky loser:

- Irina Khromacheva

=== Withdrawals ===
- (Romania) Irina-Camelia Begu → replaced by (Germany) Eva Lys
- Margarita Betova → replaced by Polina Kudermetova
- (Australia) Kimberly Birrell → replaced by (China) Yuan Yue
- Anna Kalinskaya → replaced by (United States) Ashlyn Krueger
- (Czech Republic) Tereza Martincová → replaced by (South Korea) Jang Su-jeong
- (France) Diane Parry → replaced by (Brazil) Laura Pigossi
- (United States) Bernarda Pera → replaced by Irina Khromacheva
- (China) Wang Yafan → replaced by (Slovakia) Viktória Hrunčáková

== Doubles main draw entrants ==
=== Seeds ===
Country	Player	Country	Player	Rank^{1}	Seed
JPN	Eri Hozumi	JPN	Makoto Ninomiya	103	1
CZE	Marie Bouzková	USA	Bethanie Mattek-Sands	109	2
	Irina Khromacheva	TPE	Wu Fang-hsien	123	3
USA	Sabrina Santamaria		Yana Sizikova	133	4

- ^{1} Rankings as of 2 October 2023

=== Other entrants ===
The following pairs received wildcards into the doubles main draw:

- (South Korea) Back Da-yeon / (South Korea) Jeong Bo-young
- (South Korea) Choi Ji-hee / (South Korea) Park So-hyun

The following pair received entry as alternates:

- (Chinese Taipei) Liang En-shuo / (China) Yuan Yue

=== Withdrawals ===
- (Slovakia) Viktória Hrunčáková / (Netherlands) Arantxa Rus → replaced by (Chinese Taipei) Liang En-shuo / (China) Yuan Yue
