= 2011 Korea Open – Singles qualifying =

This article displays the qualifying draw of the 2011 Korea Open.

== Players ==
=== Seeds ===
1. (Japan) Erika Sema (withdrew, take part of ITF Ningbo)
2. (Japan) Junri Namigata (second round)
3. (Japan) Rika Fujiwara (qualifying competition)
4. (Japan) Yurika Sema (qualified)
5. (Czech Republic) Karolína Plíšková (second round)
6. (Poland) Marta Domachowska (qualifying competition)
7. (Czech Republic) Krystina Plíšková (qualified)
8. (Kazakhstan) Yaroslava Shvedova (qualified)
9. (Japan) Erika Takao (first round)

=== Qualifiers ===
1. (Austria) Nicole Rottmann
2. (Czech Republic) Krystina Plíšková
3. (Kazakhstan) Yaroslava Shvedova
4. (Japan) Yurika Sema

== Qualifying draw ==
=== First qualifier ===
First round
9	(Japan) Erika Takao	4	6^{3}
(South Africa) Natalie Grandin	6	7^{7}
(Japan) Ryoko Fuda	6	2	6
(Japan) Shuko Aoyama	4	6	4
WC	(South Korea) Hong Seung-yeon	3	1
(Austria) Nicole Rottmann	6	6
WC	(South Korea) Song Ah	3	2
5	(Czech Republic) Karolína Plíšková	6	6

Second round
(South Africa) Natalie Grandin	6	6^{4}	3
(Japan) Ryoko Fuda	0	7^{7}	6
(Austria) Nicole Rottmann	3	6	7^{7}
5	(Czech Republic) Karolína Plíšková	6	0	6^{4}

Qualifying competition
(Japan) Ryoko Fuda	3	2
(Austria) Nicole Rottmann	6	6

=== Second qualifier ===
First round
2	(Japan) Junri Namigata	7	2	6
(Australia) Karolina Wlodarczak	5	6	2
(Finland) Emma Laine	6	6
(South Korea) Han Na-lae	2	0
(Thailand) Nudnida Luangnam	2	5
(Bosnia and Herzegovina) Mervana Jugić-Salkić	6	7
(Greece) Stamatia Fafaliou	1	2
7	(Czech Republic) Krystina Plíšková	6	6

Second round
2	(Japan) Junri Namigata	4	4
(Finland) Emma Laine	6	6
(Bosnia and Herzegovina) Mervana Jugić-Salkić	2	3
7	(Czech Republic) Krystina Plíšková	6	6

Qualifying competition
(Finland) Emma Laine	5	6^{3}
7	(Czech Republic) Krystina Plíšková	7	7^{7}

=== Third qualifier ===
First round
3	(Japan) Rika Fujiwara	6	7^{7}
WC	(South Korea) Hong Hyun-hui	2	6^{4}
(South Korea) Ji Ha-young	3	2
WC	(South Korea) Kim Ji-young	6	6
(South Korea) Han Sung-hee	6	6
WC	(South Korea) Oh Hee-jin	1	0
WC	(South Korea) Choi Ji-hee	0	0
8	(Kazakhstan) Yaroslava Shvedova	6	6

Second round
3	(Japan) Rika Fujiwara	6	6
WC	(South Korea) Kim Ji-young	1	1
(South Korea) Han Sung-hee	3	3
8	(Kazakhstan) Yaroslava Shvedova	6	6

Qualifying competition
3	(Japan) Rika Fujiwara	0	0
8	(Kazakhstan) Yaroslava Shvedova	6	6

=== Fourth qualifier ===
First round
4	(Japan) Yurika Sema	7^{7}	6
(Japan) Remi Tezuka	6^{5}	2
WC	(South Korea) Lee So-ra	2	2
(South Korea) Jang Su-jeong	6	6
(Japan) Yumi Nakano	6	6
WC	(South Korea) Kim Ki-ryang	0	3
WC	(South Korea) Yea Hyo-jung	2	0
6	(Poland) Marta Domachowska	6	6

Second round
4	(Japan) Yurika Sema	6	6
(South Korea) Jang Su-jeong	2	4
(Japan) Yumi Nakano	2	1
6	(Poland) Marta Domachowska	6	6

Qualifying competition
4	(Japan) Yurika Sema	3	6	7^{7}
6	(Poland) Marta Domachowska	6	2	6^{4}
