= 2013 Korea Open – Singles =

Singles
- 2013 Korea Open

Final
- Champion: (Poland) Agnieszka Radwańska
- Runner-up: (Russia) Anastasia Pavlyuchenkova
- Score: 6–7^{(6–8)}, 6–3, 6–4

Details
- Draw: 32
- Seeds: 8

Events
Singles	Doubles
← 2012 ·	Korea Open	· 2014 →

Caroline Wozniacki was the defending champion, but she chose not to participate this year.
Agnieszka Radwańska won the title, defeating Anastasia Pavlyuchenkova in the final, 6–7^{(6–8)}, 6–3, 6–4.

== Seeds ==
1. (Poland) Agnieszka Radwańska (champion)
2. (Russia) Maria Kirilenko (second round)
3. (Russia) Anastasia Pavlyuchenkova (final)
4. (Czech Republic) Klára Zakopalová (first round)
5. (Ukraine) Elina Svitolina (first round)
6. (Germany) Julia Görges (second round)
7. (Germany) Andrea Petkovic (first round)
8. (Germany) Annika Beck (second round)

== Draw ==
=== Key ===
- Q = Qualifier
- WC = Wild card
- LL = Lucky loser
- Alt = Alternate
- SE = Special exempt
- PR = Protected ranking
- ITF = ITF entry
- JE = Junior exempt
- w/o = Walkover
- r = Retired
- d = Defaulted
- SR = Special ranking

=== Finals ===
Semifinals
1	(Poland) Agnieszka Radwańska	6	6
(Spain) Lara Arruabarrena	0	2
3	(Russia) Anastasia Pavlyuchenkova	7^{13}	7^{8}
(Italy) Francesca Schiavone	6^{11}	6^{6}

Final
1	(Poland) Agnieszka Radwańska	6^{6}	6	6
3	(Russia) Anastasia Pavlyuchenkova	7^{8}	3	4

=== Top half ===
First round
1	(Poland) A Radwańska	6	6
(Romania) A Cadanțu	4	0
(Luxembourg) M Minella	5	4
(Spain) E Cabeza Candela	7	6
(Russia) V Dushevina	6	6
(Spain) S Soler Espinosa	4	1
Q	(Japan) R Ozaki	6	6^{5}	4
8	(Germany) A Beck	3	7^{7}	6
4	(Czech Republic) K Zakopalová	3	1
WC	(South Korea) S-j Jang	6	6
(Italy) N Burnett	5	0
Q	(Tunisia) O Jabeur	7	6
WC	(South Korea) S-h Han	0	6^{0}
(Romania) A Dulgheru	6	7^{7}
(Spain) L Arruabarrena	7	2	6
5	(Ukraine) E Svitolina	5	6	4

Second round
1	(Poland) A Radwańska	6	6
(Spain) E Cabeza Candela	2	1
(Russia) V Dushevina	6	7
8	(Germany) A Beck	3	5
WC	(South Korea) S-j Jang	1	6	6
Q	(Tunisia) O Jabeur	6	4	1
(Romania) A Dulgheru	1	6	4
(Spain) L Arruabarrena	6	3	6

Quarterfinals
1	(Poland) A Radwańska	6	6
(Russia) V Dushevina	2	0
WC	(South Korea) S-j Jang	0	4
(Spain) L Arruabarrena	6	6

Semifinals
1	(Poland) A Radwańska	6	6
(Spain) L Arruabarrena	0	2

=== Bottom half ===
First round
6	(Germany) J Görges	6	7
(Japan) M Doi	3	5
(Romania) I-C Begu	6	6
Q	(China) X Han	3	4
WC	(South Korea) Y-r Lee	6	6
(Russia) D Gavrilova	4	1
(Spain) A Medina Garrigues	7	2	3
3	(Russia) A Pavlyuchenkova	5	6	6
7	(Germany) A Petkovic	1	6	4
(Italy) F Schiavone	6	2	6
(France) V Razzano	6	6
(Spain) L Domínguez Lino	1	1
(United Kingdom) H Watson	6	3	4
(Japan) K Date-Krumm	3	6	6
Q	(Chinese Taipei) C-w Chan	3	3
2	(Russia) M Kirilenko	6	6

Second round
6	(Germany) J Görges	4	0
(Romania) I-C Begu	6	6
WC	(South Korea) Y-r Lee	4	1
3	(Russia) A Pavlyuchenkova	6	6
(Italy) F Schiavone	7^{7}	3	6
(France) V Razzano	6^{5}	6	3
(Japan) K Date-Krumm	6	6
2	(Russia) M Kirilenko	3	1

Quarterfinals
(Romania) I-C Begu	2	2
3	(Russia) A Pavlyuchenkova	6	6
(Italy) F Schiavone	4	6	6
(Japan) K Date-Krumm	6	4	4

Semifinals
3	(Russia) A Pavlyuchenkova	7^{13}	7^{8}
(Italy) F Schiavone	6^{11}	6^{6}

== Qualifying ==
=== Seeds ===
1. (Russia) Daria Gavrilova (moved to main draw)
2. (Montenegro) Danka Kovinić (first round)
3. (Ukraine) Olga Savchuk (first round)
4. (Poland) Katarzyna Piter (qualifying competition)
5. (Tunisia) Ons Jabeur (qualified)
6. (Spain) Arantxa Parra Santonja (qualifying competition)
7. (Japan) Risa Ozaki (qualified)
8. (China) Zhang Yuxuan (second round)
9. (Japan) Eri Hozumi (second round)

=== Qualifiers ===
1. (China) Han Xinyun
2. (Japan) Risa Ozaki
3. (Chinese Taipei) Chan Chin-wei
4. (Tunisia) Ons Jabeur

=== Qualifying draw ===
==== First qualifier ====
First round
9	(Japan) Eri Hozumi	6	6
(Japan) Kanae Hisami	0	2
(Japan) Mari Tanaka	3	6^{5}
(China) Han Xinyun	6	7^{7}
(Japan) Miki Miyamura	6	6
WC	(South Korea) Choi Su-yeon	1	1
(South Korea) Lee So-ra	5	6	5
6	(Spain) Arantxa Parra Santonja	7	4	7

Second round
9	(Japan) Eri Hozumi	6	3	4
(China) Han Xinyun	2	6	6
(Japan) Miki Miyamura	2	5
6	(Spain) Arantxa Parra Santonja	6	7

Qualifying competition
(China) Han Xinyun	6	7^{7}
6	(Spain) Arantxa Parra Santonja	2	6^{2}

==== Second qualifier ====
First round
2	(Montenegro) Danka Kovinić	5	2
(Thailand) Varatchaya Wongteanchai	7	6
Alt	(South Korea) Hong Seung-yeon	6	6
WC	(South Korea) Jun Nam-yeon	1	0
(Thailand) Nicha Lertpitaksinchai	6	6
(Japan) Mai Minokoshi	2	1
WC	(South Korea) Choi Ji-hee	2	0
7	(Japan) Risa Ozaki	6	6

Second round
(Thailand) Varatchaya Wongteanchai	6	5	6
Alt	(South Korea) Hong Seung-yeon	3	7	1
(Thailand) Nicha Lertpitaksinchai	3	3
7	(Japan) Risa Ozaki	6	6

Qualifying competition
(Thailand) Varatchaya Wongteanchai	2	1
7	(Japan) Risa Ozaki	6	6

==== Third qualifier ====
First round
3	(Ukraine) Olga Savchuk	4	6	1
(Slovakia) Michaela Hončová	6	4	6
(United States) Raquel Kops-Jones	6	6
(Japan) Yuka Higuchi	4	2
(Chinese Taipei) Chan Chin-wei	6	6
(Japan) Chiaki Okadaue	1	1
(Thailand) Peangtarn Plipuech	1	2
8	(China) Zhang Yuxuan	6	6

Second round
(Slovakia) Michaela Hončová	6	6
(United States) Raquel Kops-Jones	4	1
(Chinese Taipei) Chan Chin-wei	6^{3}	7^{7}	6
8	(China) Zhang Yuxuan	7^{7}	6^{4}	3

Qualifying competition
(Slovakia) Michaela Hončová	6	6^{1}	2
(Chinese Taipei) Chan Chin-wei	3	7^{7}	6

==== Fourth qualifier ====
First round
4	(Poland) Katarzyna Piter	6^{6}	6	6
(Ukraine) Veronika Kapshay	7^{8}	2	3
(China) Xu Yifan	6	7
(Serbia) Barbara Bonić	1	5
(Romania) Raluca Olaru	6	6
WC	(South Korea) Song Ah	0	2
(Japan) Shuko Aoyama	6	6^{8}	1
5	(Tunisia) Ons Jabeur	3	7^{10}	6

Second round
4	(Poland) Katarzyna Piter	6	7^{7}
(China) Xu Yifan	4	6^{4}
(Romania) Raluca Olaru	5	3
5	(Tunisia) Ons Jabeur	7	6

Qualifying competition
4	(Poland) Katarzyna Piter	6	4	5
5	(Tunisia) Ons Jabeur	2	6	7
