= 2012 Korea Open – Singles =

Singles
- 2012 Korea Open

Final
- Champion: (Denmark) Caroline Wozniacki
- Runner-up: (Estonia) Kaia Kanepi
- Score: 6–1, 6–0

Details
- Draw: 32
- Seeds: 8

Events
Singles	Doubles
- Korea Open

María José Martínez Sánchez was the defending champion, but lost to Ekaterina Makarova in the quarterfinals.

Caroline Wozniacki won the title, defeating Kaia Kanepi in the final, 6–1, 6–0. This was the first title in 13 months for the former World No. 1 and her first of 2012.

== Seeds ==
1. (Denmark) Caroline Wozniacki (champion)
2. (Russia) Maria Kirilenko (first round, retired because of a back injury)
3. (Estonia) Kaia Kanepi (final)
4. (Russia) Nadia Petrova (second round, withdrew because of a back injury)
5. (Germany) Julia Görges (first round)
6. (United States) Varvara Lepchenko (semifinals)
7. (Czech Republic) Klára Zakopalová (quarterfinals)
8. (Russia) Ekaterina Makarova (semifinals)

== Draw ==
Key

- Q = Qualifier
- WC = Wild card
- LL = Lucky loser
- Alt = Alternate
- ITF = ITF entry
- PR = Protected ranking
- SR = Special ranking
- SE = Special exempt
- JE = Junior exempt
- JR = Junior Accelerator Programme entrant
- CO = College Accelerator Programme entrant
- NG = Next Gen Accelerator Program entrant
- w/o = Walkover
- r = Retired
- d = Defaulted

=== Finals ===
Semifinals
1	(Denmark) Caroline Wozniacki	6	5	6
8	(Russia) Ekaterina Makarova	1	7	4
3	(Estonia) Kaia Kanepi	6	2	6
6	(United States) Varvara Lepchenko	4	6	4

Final
1	(Denmark) Caroline Wozniacki	6	6
3	(Estonia) Kaia Kanepi	1	0

=== Top half ===
First round
1	(Denmark) C Wozniacki	6	6
(Netherlands) A Rus	1	2
Q	(France) C Garcia	6	6
(Romania) A Cadanțu	2	3
(Japan) K Date-Krumm	4	3
(Slovakia) M Rybáriková	6	6
(Spain) G Muguruza	4	6	6^{1}
7	(Czech Republic) K Zakopalová	6	4	7^{7}
4	(Russia) N Petrova	6	6
(Spain) L Domínguez Lino	2	4
Q	(Greece) E Daniilidou	2	3
(Spain) MJ Martínez Sánchez	6	6
(Switzerland) R Oprandi	7	3	2
Q	(United States) J Hampton	5	6	6
(Slovenia) P Hercog	4	1
8	(Russia) E Makarova	6	6

Second round
1	(Denmark) C Wozniacki	6	6
Q	(France) C Garcia	2	3
(Slovakia) M Rybáriková	1	6^{6}
7	(Czech Republic) K Zakopalová	6	7^{8}
4	(Russia) N Petrova
(Spain) MJ Martínez Sánchez	w/o
Q	(United States) J Hampton	3	5
8	(Russia) E Makarova	6	7

Quarterfinals
1	(Denmark) C Wozniacki	6	6
7	(Czech Republic) K Zakopalová	2	3
(Spain) MJ Martínez Sánchez	1	1
8	(Russia) E Makarova	6	6

Semifinals
1	(Denmark) C Wozniacki	6	5	6
8	(Russia) E Makarova	1	7	4

=== Bottom half ===
First round
5	(Germany) J Görges	6	6^{5}	2
(Spain) S Soler Espinosa	1	7^{7}	6
(United States) V King	3	1
(Netherlands) K Bertens	6	6
(Kazakhstan) G Voskoboeva	6	6
WC	(South Korea) H-h Hong	1	2
WC	(South Korea) S-h Han	1	0
3	(Estonia) K Kanepi	6	6
6	(United States) V Lepchenko	6	7^{7}
(Italy) C Giorgi	2	6^{1}
Q	(Kazakhstan) S Karatantcheva	4	4
(Spain) A Medina Garrigues	6	6
(Austria) T Paszek	7^{10}	6
(Spain) C Suárez Navarro	6^{8}	3
WC	(South Korea) S-r Lee	1
2	(Russia) M Kirilenko	1^{r}

Second round
(Spain) S Soler Espinosa	6	6^{3}	2
(Netherlands) K Bertens	1	7^{7}	6
(Kazakhstan) G Voskoboeva	2	2
3	(Estonia) K Kanepi	6	6
6	(United States) V Lepchenko	6	6
(Spain) A Medina Garrigues	4	1
(Austria) T Paszek	6	6
WC	(South Korea) S-r Lee	2	0

Quarterfinals
(Netherlands) K Bertens	4	4
3	(Estonia) K Kanepi	6	6
6	(United States) V Lepchenko	4	7^{7}	6
(Austria) T Paszek	6	6^{3}	4

Semifinals
3	(Estonia) K Kanepi	6	2	6
6	(United States) V Lepchenko	4	6	4

== Qualifying ==
=== Seeds ===
1. (Kazakhstan) Sesil Karatantcheva (qualified)
2. (United States) Jamie Hampton (qualified)
3. (Greece) Eleni Daniilidou (qualified)
4. (Hungary) Gréta Arn (qualifying competition)
5. (Russia) Vera Dushevina (qualifying competition)
6. (Japan) Misaki Doi (first round)
7. (France) Claire Feuerstein (second round)
8. (Uzbekistan) Akgul Amanmuradova (qualifying competition)

=== Qualifiers ===
1. (Kazakhstan) Sesil Karatantcheva
2. (United States) Jamie Hampton
3. (Greece) Eleni Daniilidou
4. (France) Caroline Garcia

=== Draw ===
==== First qualifier ====
First round
1	(Kazakhstan) Sesil Karatantcheva	6	6
WC	(South Korea) Choi Ji-hee	2	1
(France) Victoria Larrière	6	6
(Russia) Ksenia Lykina	4	4
(Russia) Ekaterina Yashina	1	0
(Australia) Karolina Wlodarczak	6	6
(United States) Jill Craybas	5	2
5	(Russia) Vera Dushevina	7	6

Second round
1	(Kazakhstan) Sesil Karatantcheva	6	6
(France) Victoria Larrière	0	2
(Australia) Karolina Wlodarczak	4	0
5	(Russia) Vera Dushevina	6	6

Qualifying competition
1	(Kazakhstan) Sesil Karatantcheva	6	6
5	(Russia) Vera Dushevina	2	1

==== Second qualifier ====
First round
2	(United States) Jamie Hampton	6	6
(Croatia) Darija Jurak	3	3
(Japan) Rika Fujiwara	6^{3}	5
(Serbia) Aleksandra Krunić	7^{7}	7
WC	(South Korea) Han Na-lae	4	2
WC	(South Korea) Jun Nam-yeon	6	6
(Colombia) Catalina Castaño	7^{7}	6
6	(Japan) Misaki Doi	6^{2}	2

Second round
2	(United States) Jamie Hampton	6	6
(Serbia) Aleksandra Krunić	3	2
WC	(South Korea) Jun Nam-yeon	0	1
(Colombia) Catalina Castaño	6	6

Qualifying competition
2	(United States) Jamie Hampton	6	6
(Colombia) Catalina Castaño	2	2

==== Third qualifier ====
First round
3	(Greece) Eleni Daniilidou	6	6
(South Korea) Jang Su-jeong	1	3
(Thailand) Noppawan Lertcheewakarn	5	6	6
(United States) Abigail Spears	7	3	2
(Russia) Daria Gavrilova	6	4	6
(Japan) Erika Takao	1	6	2
(South Korea) Kim So-jung	1	0
8	(Uzbekistan) Akgul Amanmuradova	6	6

Second round
3	(Greece) Eleni Daniilidou	6	6
(Thailand) Noppawan Lertcheewakarn	3	2
(Russia) Daria Gavrilova	1	6^{3}
8	(Uzbekistan) Akgul Amanmuradova	6	7^{7}

Qualifying competition
3	(Greece) Eleni Daniilidou	6	6
8	(Uzbekistan) Akgul Amanmuradova	2	4

==== Fourth qualifier ====
First round
4	(Hungary) Gréta Arn	1	6	7
(Japan) Junri Namigata	6	1	5
(Japan) Shiho Akita	6	6
(Hungary) Katalin Marosi	4	3
(United States) Raquel Kops-Jones	6	5	3
(France) Caroline Garcia	3	7	6
WC	(South Korea) Song Ah	0	2
7	(France) Claire Feuerstein	6	6

Second round
4	(Hungary) Gréta Arn	6	6
(Japan) Shiho Akita	0	3
(France) Caroline Garcia	7^{7}	6
7	(France) Claire Feuerstein	6^{4}	2

Qualifying competition
4	(Hungary) Gréta Arn	1	6	5
(France) Caroline Garcia	6	3	7
