= 2013 Korea Open – Doubles =

Doubles
- 2013 Korea Open

Final
- Champions: (Chinese Taipei) Chan Chin-wei (China) Xu Yifan
- Runners-up: (United States) Raquel Kops-Jones (United States) Abigail Spears
- Score: 7–5, 6–3

Details
- Draw: 16
- Seeds: 4

Events
Singles	Doubles
← 2012 ·	Korea Open	· 2014 →

Raquel Kops-Jones and Abigail Spears were the defending champions, but lost in the final to Chan Chin-wei and Xu Yifan, 5–7, 3–6.

== Seeds ==
1. (United States) Raquel Kops-Jones / (United States) Abigail Spears (final)
2. (Japan) Kimiko Date-Krumm / (Germany) Julia Görges (first round)
3. (Japan) Shuko Aoyama / (United States) Megan Moulton-Levy (semifinals)
4. (Slovakia) Janette Husárová / (Spain) Arantxa Parra Santonja (semifinals)

== Draw ==
=== Key ===
- Q = Qualifier
- WC = Wild card
- LL = Lucky loser
- Alt = Alternate
- SE = Special exempt
- PR = Protected ranking
- ITF = ITF entry
- JE = Junior exempt
- w/o = Walkover
- r = Retired
- d = Defaulted
- SR = Special ranking

=== Draw ===
First round
1	(United States) R Kops-Jones (United States) A Spears	6	7
(Romania) I-C Begu (Romania) A Cadanțu	3	5
(China) X Han (Ukraine) V Kapshay	3	0
(Ukraine) Y Beygelzimer (Poland) K Piter	6	6
4	(Slovakia) J Husárová (Spain) A Parra Santonja	5	6	[10]
WC	(South Korea) S-h Han (South Korea) S-r Lee	7	2	[3]
(Japan) M Miyamura (Thailand) V Wongteanchai	4	2
(Spain) L Arruabarrena (Romania) A Dulgheru	6	6
(Romania) R Olaru (Ukraine) O Savchuk	5	7	[5]
(Spain) L Domínguez Lino (United Kingdom) H Watson	7	5	[10]
WC	(South Korea) S-y Hong (South Korea) H-m Lee	3	3
3	(Japan) S Aoyama (United States) M Moulton-Levy	6	6
(Japan) E Sema (Japan) Y Sema	7^{8}	7^{13}
(Thailand) N Lertpitaksinchai (Thailand) P Plipuech	6^{6}	6^{11}
(Chinese Taipei) C-w Chan (China) Y Xu	6	6
2	(Japan) K Date-Krumm (Germany) J Görges	3	2

Quarterfinals
1	(United States) R Kops-Jones (United States) A Spears	4	6	[10]
(Ukraine) Y Beygelzimer (Poland) K Piter	6	0	[2]
4	(Slovakia) J Husárová (Spain) A Parra Santonja	7	6
(Spain) L Arruabarrena (Romania) A Dulgheru	5	4
(Spain) L Domínguez Lino (United Kingdom) H Watson	5	2
3	(Japan) S Aoyama (United States) M Moulton-Levy	7	6
(Japan) E Sema (Japan) Y Sema	6	4	[4]
(Chinese Taipei) C-w Chan (China) Y Xu	2	6	[10]

Semifinals
1	(United States) R Kops-Jones (United States) A Spears	6	6
4	(Slovakia) J Husárová (Spain) A Parra Santonja	3	2
3	(Japan) S Aoyama (United States) M Moulton-Levy	5	1
(Chinese Taipei) C-w Chan (China) Y Xu	7	6

Final
1	(United States) R Kops-Jones (United States) A Spears	5	3
(Chinese Taipei) C-w Chan (China) Y Xu	7	6
