= 2011 Korea Open – Doubles =

Doubles
- 2011 Korea Open
- 2010 Champions: (Germany) Julia Görges (Slovenia) Polona Hercog

Final
- Champions: (South Africa) Natalie Grandin (Czech Republic) Vladimíra Uhlířová
- Runners-up: (Russia) Vera Dushevina (Kazakhstan) Galina Voskoboeva
- Score: 7–6^{(7–5)}, 6–4

Details
- Draw: 16
- Seeds: 4

Events
Singles	Doubles
← 2010 ·	Korea Open	· 2012 →

Julia Görges and Polona Hercog were the defending champions but Görges decided not to participate.
Hercog played alongside Irina-Camelia Begu, but were eliminated in the first round by María José Martínez Sánchez and Francesca Schiavone.
Natalie Grandin and Vladimíra Uhlířová won in the final 7–6^{(7–5)}, 6–4 against Vera Dushevina and Galina Voskoboeva

== Seeds ==
1. (South Africa) Natalie Grandin / (Czech Republic) Vladimíra Uhlířová (champions)
2. (Russia) Vera Dushevina / (Kazakhstan) Galina Voskoboeva (final)
3. (Czech Republic) Iveta Benešová / (Czech Republic) Klára Zakopalová (semifinals)
4. (Poland) Klaudia Jans-Ignacik / (Poland) Alicja Rosolska (semifinals)

== Draw ==
=== Key ===
- Q = Qualifier
- WC = Wild card
- LL = Lucky loser
- Alt = Alternate
- SE = Special exempt
- PR = Protected ranking
- ITF = ITF entry
- JE = Junior exempt
- w/o = Walkover
- r = Retired
- d = Defaulted
- SR = Special ranking

=== Draw ===
First round
1	(South Africa) N Grandin (Czech Republic) V Uhlířová	6	6
WC	(South Korea) J-h Choi (South Korea) S-y Hong	4	2
(Bosnia and Herzegovina) M Jugić-Salkić (Finland) E Laine	3	6	[6]
(Czech Republic) E Birnerová (Greece) E Daniilidou	6	3	[10]
3	(Czech Republic) I Benešová (Czech Republic) K Zakopalová	6	6
WC	(South Korea) S-h Han (South Korea) S-j Kim	2	1
(Czech Republic) Ka Plíšková (Czech Republic) Kr Plíšková	3	3
(Chinese Taipei) C-j Chuang (Japan) K Date-Krumm	6	6
(Romania) I-C Begu (Slovenia) P Hercog	6	5	[8]
(Spain) MJ Martínez Sánchez (Italy) F Schiavone	3	7	[10]
(Japan) E Takao (Japan) R Tezuka	2	1
4	(Poland) K Jans-Ignacik (Poland) A Rosolska	6	6
(Japan) S Aoyama (Japan) R Fujiwara	6	4	[10]
(Romania) A Dulgheru (Thailand) T Tanasugarn	2	6	[1]
(Uzbekistan) A Amanmuradova (Russia) E Makarova	4	4
2	(Russia) V Dushevina (Kazakhstan) G Voskoboeva	6	6

Quarterfinals
1	(South Africa) N Grandin (Czech Republic) V Uhlířová	7^{8}	3	[10]
(Czech Republic) E Birnerová (Greece) E Daniilidou	6^{6}	6	[7]
3	(Czech Republic) I Benešová (Czech Republic) K Zakopalová	6	7^{8}
(Chinese Taipei) C-j Chuang (Japan) K Date-Krumm	2	6^{6}
(Spain) MJ Martínez Sánchez (Italy) F Schiavone
4	(Poland) K Jans-Ignacik (Poland) A Rosolska	w/o
(Japan) S Aoyama (Japan) R Fujiwara	5	4
2	(Russia) V Dushevina (Kazakhstan) G Voskoboeva	7	6

Semifinals
1	(South Africa) N Grandin (Czech Republic) V Uhlířová	7^{7}	0	[10]
3	(Czech Republic) I Benešová (Czech Republic) K Zakopalová	6^{5}	6	[7]
4	(Poland) K Jans-Ignacik (Poland) A Rosolska	3	4
2	(Russia) V Dushevina (Kazakhstan) G Voskoboeva	6	6

Final
1	(South Africa) N Grandin (Czech Republic) V Uhlířová	7^{7}	6
2	(Russia) V Dushevina (Kazakhstan) G Voskoboeva	6^{5}	4
