= 2013 Korea Open =

- Date: 16–22 September
- Edition: 10th
- Category: WTA International
- Draw: 32S / 16D
- Prize money: $500,000
- Surface: Hard / outdoor
- Location: Seoul, South Korea
- Venue: Seoul Olympic Park Tennis Center

Champions

Singles
- (Poland) Agnieszka Radwańska

Doubles
- (Chinese Taipei) Chan Chin-wei / (China) Xu Yifan
← 2012 ·	Korea Open	· 2014 →

The 2013 Korea Open was a women's professional tennis tournament played on hard courts. It was the 10th edition of the tournament, which was part of the WTA International category of the 2013 WTA Tour. It took place at the Seoul Olympic Park Tennis Center in Seoul, South Korea between 16 September and 22 September 2013. First-seeded Agnieszka Radwańska won the singles title.

== Finals ==
=== Singles ===
(Poland) Agnieszka Radwańska defeated (Russia) Anastasia Pavlyuchenkova 6–7^{(6–8)}, 6–3, 6–4

- It was Radwańska's 3rd and last singles title of the year and the 13th of her career.

=== Doubles ===
(Chinese Taipei) Chan Chin-wei / (China) Xu Yifan defeated (United States) Raquel Kops-Jones / (United States) Abigail Spears 7–5, 6–3

== Singles main-draw entrants ==
=== Seeds ===
Country	Player	Rank^{1}	Seed
POL	Agnieszka Radwańska	4	1
RUS	Maria Kirilenko	20	2
RUS	Anastasia Pavlyuchenkova	33	3
CZE	Klára Zakopalová	34	4
UKR	Elina Svitolina	41	5
GER	Julia Görges	47	6
GER	Andrea Petkovic	50	7
GER	Annika Beck	51	8

- ^{1} Rankings are as of September 9, 2013

=== Other entrants ===
The following players received wildcards into the singles main draw:

- (South Korea) Han Sung-hee
- (South Korea) Jang Su-jeong
- (South Korea) Lee Ye-ra

The following players received entry from the qualifying draw:

- (Chinese Taipei) Chan Chin-wei
- (China) Han Xinyun
- (Tunisia) Ons Jabeur
- (Japan) Risa Ozaki

=== Withdrawals ===
Before the tournament

- (Netherlands) Kiki Bertens (ankle injury)
- (France) Caroline Garcia
- (United States) Jamie Hampton (left ankle injury)
- (Russia) Ekaterina Makarova
- (Japan) Ayumi Morita
- (Slovakia) Magdaléna Rybáriková
- (Spain) Carla Suárez Navarro
- (Switzerland) Stefanie Vögele

== Doubles main-draw entrants ==
=== Seeds ===
Country	Player	Country	Player	Rank^{1}	Seed
USA	Raquel Kops-Jones	USA	Abigail Spears	32	1
JPN	Kimiko Date-Krumm	GER	Julia Görges	60	2
JPN	Shuko Aoyama	USA	Megan Moulton-Levy	87	3
SVK	Janette Husárová	ESP	Arantxa Parra Santonja	103	4

- ^{1} Rankings are as of September 9, 2013

=== Other entrants ===
The following pairs received wildcards into the doubles main draw:

- (South Korea) Hong Seung-yeon / (South Korea) Lee Hye-min
- (South Korea) Han Sung-hee / (South Korea) Lee So-ra
