= 2010 Korea Open – Doubles =

Doubles
- 2010 Korea Open

Final
- Champion: (Germany) Julia Görges (Slovenia) Polona Hercog
- Runner-up: (South Africa) Natalie Grandin (Czech Republic) Vladimíra Uhlířová
- Score: 6–3, 6–4

Details
- Draw: 16
- Seeds: 4

Events
Singles	Doubles
← 2009 ·	Korea Open	· 2011 →

Chan Yung-jan and Abigail Spears were the defending champions, but did not participate that year.
Julia Görges and Polona Hercog defeated Natalie Grandin and Vladimíra Uhlířová in the final, 6–3, 6–4.

== Seeds ==
1. (United States) Vania King / (Kazakhstan) Yaroslava Shvedova (quarterfinals)
2. (Spain) Nuria Llagostera Vives / (Spain) María José Martínez Sánchez (first round)
3. (Russia) Alisa Kleybanova / (China) Yan Zi (first round)
4. (South Africa) Natalie Grandin / (Czech Republic) Vladimíra Uhlířová (final)

== Draw ==
=== Key ===
- Q = Qualifier
- WC = Wild card
- LL = Lucky loser
- Alt = Alternate
- SE = Special exempt
- PR = Protected ranking
- ITF = ITF entry
- JE = Junior exempt
- w/o = Walkover
- r = Retired
- d = Defaulted
- SR = Special ranking

=== Draw ===
First round
1	(United States) V King (Kazakhstan) Y Shvedova	6	7
(China) J-j Lu (China) Y-F Xu	4	5
(Japan) K Date Krumm (Japan) A Morita	7	6
(Australia) S Ferguson (Japan) R Fujiwara	6^{4}	4
4	(South Africa) N Grandin (Czech Republic) V Uhlířová	6	6
(Canada) M-È Pelletier (Poland) A Rosolska	3	3
(South Korea) K-m Chang (South Korea) J-a Lee	6	6
WC	(South Korea) S-h Han (South Korea) S-y Hong	4	1
(Italy) A Brianti (Romania) E Gallovits	6	6
(Australia) J Groth (Czech Republic) K Zakopalová	4	4
(Germany) J Görges (Slovenia) P Hercog	6	6
3	(Russia) A Kleybanova (China) Z Yan	4	2
(China) S Sun (China) S Zhang	4	7	[8]
WC	(South Korea) S-j Kim (South Korea) Y-r Lee	6	6^{4}	[10]
(Poland) K Jans (Australia) S Peers	6	6
2	(Spain) N Llagostera Vives (Spain) MJ Martínez Sánchez	3	1

Quarterfinals
1	(United States) V King (Kazakhstan) Y Shvedova	5	6	[9]
(Japan) K Date Krumm (Japan) A Morita	7	1	[11]
4	(South Africa) N Grandin (Czech Republic) V Uhlířová	7	6
(South Korea) K-m Chang (South Korea) J-a Lee	6^{6}	2
(Italy) A Brianti (Romania) E Gallovits	4	6	[10]
(Germany) J Görges (Slovenia) P Hercog	6	2	[12]
WC	(South Korea) S-j Kim (South Korea) Y-r Lee	6	2	[7]
(Poland) K Jans (Australia) S Peers	1	6	[10]

Semifinals
(Japan) K Date Krumm (Japan) A Morita	1	5
4	(South Africa) N Grandin (Czech Republic) V Uhlířová	6	7
(Germany) J Görges (Slovenia) P Hercog	6	6
(Poland) K Jans (Australia) S Peers	3	1

Finals
4	(South Africa) N Grandin (Czech Republic) V Uhlířová	3	4
(Germany) J Görges (Slovenia) P Hercog	6	6
