= 2012 Korea Open =

- Date: 17–23 September
- Edition: 9th
- Category: WTA International
- Draw: 32S / 16D
- Prize money: $500,000
- Surface: Hard / outdoor
- Location: Seoul, South Korea
- Venue: Seoul Olympic Park Tennis Center

Champions

Singles
- (Denmark) Caroline Wozniacki

Doubles
- (United States) Raquel Kops-Jones / (United States) Abigail Spears
← 2011 ·	Korea Open	· 2013 →

The 2012 Korea Open was a women's professional tennis tournament played on hard courts. It was the ninth edition of the tournament which was part of the WTA International category of the 2012 WTA Tour. It took place at the Seoul Olympic Park Tennis Center in Seoul, South Korea between 17 September and 23 September 2012. First-seeded Caroline Wozniacki won the singles title.

== Finals ==
=== Singles ===
(Denmark) Caroline Wozniacki defeated (Estonia) Kaia Kanepi 6–1, 6–0

- It was Wozniacki's first singles title of the year, ending a 13-month drought. It was also her 19th career title.

=== Doubles ===
(United States) Raquel Kops-Jones / (United States) Abigail Spears defeated (Uzbekistan) Akgul Amanmuradova / (United States) Vania King 2–6, 6–2, [10–8]

== Singles main-draw entrants ==
=== Seeds ===
Country	Player	Rank^{1}	Seed
DEN	Caroline Wozniacki	11	1
RUS	Maria Kirilenko	14	2
EST	Kaia Kanepi	16	3
RUS	Nadia Petrova	18	4
GER	Julia Görges	21	5
USA	Varvara Lepchenko	22	6
CZE	Klára Zakopalová	28	7
RUS	Ekaterina Makarova	29	8

- ^{1} Rankings are as of September 10, 2012

=== Other entrants ===
The following players received wildcards into the singles main draw:

- (South Korea) Hong Hyun-hui
- (South Korea) Lee So-ra
- (South Korea) Han Sung-hee

The following players received entry from the qualifying draw:

- (Greece) Eleni Daniilidou
- (France) Caroline Garcia
- (United States) Jamie Hampton
- (Kazakhstan) Sesil Karatantcheva

=== Withdrawals ===
- (Kazakhstan) Ksenia Pervak
- (United States) Sloane Stephens

=== Retirements ===
- (Russia) Maria Kirilenko (back injury)
- (Russia) Nadia Petrova (back injury)

== Doubles main-draw entrants ==
=== Seeds ===
Country	Player	Country	Player	Rank^{1}	Seed
USA	Raquel Kops-Jones	USA	Abigail Spears	41	1
IND	Sania Mirza	ESP	Anabel Medina Garrigues	44	2
RSA	Natalie Grandin	CZE	Vladimíra Uhlířová	61	3
RUS	Vera Dushevina	POL	Alicja Rosolska	95	4

- ^{1} Rankings are as of September 10, 2012

=== Other entrants ===
The following pairs received wildcards into the doubles main draw:

- (South Korea) Choi Ji-hee / (South Korea) Jun Nam-yeon
- (South Korea) Han Sung-hee / (South Korea) Lee So-ra
