= 2012 Korea Open – Doubles =

Doubles
- 2012 Korea Open

Final
- Champions: (United States) Raquel Kops-Jones (United States) Abigail Spears
- Runners-up: (Uzbekistan) Akgul Amanmuradova (United States) Vania King
- Score: 2–6, 6–2, [10–8]

Details
- Draw: 16
- Seeds: 4

Events
Singles	Doubles
← 2011 ·	Korea Open	· 2013 →

The 2012 Korea Open doubles was a women's professional tennis tournament played on hard courts in Seoul, South Korea.

Natalie Grandin and Vladimíra Uhlířová were the defending champions, but they lost in the semifinals to first seeded and American pair Raquel Kops-Jones and Abigail Spears.
Kops-Jones and Spears went on to win the title by defeating Akgul Amanmuradova and Vania King 2–6, 6–2, [10–8] in the final.

== Seeds ==
1. (United States) Raquel Kops-Jones / (United States) Abigail Spears (champions)
2. (Spain) Anabel Medina Garrigues / (India) Sania Mirza (first round)
3. (South Africa) Natalie Grandin / (Czech Republic) Vladimíra Uhlířová (semifinals)
4. (Russia) Vera Dushevina / (Poland) Alicja Rosolska (quarterfinals)

== Draw ==
=== Key ===
- Q = Qualifier
- WC = Wild card
- LL = Lucky loser
- Alt = Alternate
- SE = Special exempt
- PR = Protected ranking
- ITF = ITF entry
- JE = Junior exempt
- w/o = Walkover
- r = Retired
- d = Defaulted
- SR = Special ranking

=== Draw ===
First round
1	(United States) R Kops-Jones (United States) A Spears	6	7
(Colombia) C Castaño (Czech Republic) E Hrdinová	0	5
WC	(South Korea) S-h Han (South Korea) S-r Lee	6	2	[6]
(Croatia) D Jurak (Hungary) K Marosi	3	6	[10]
3	(South Africa) N Grandin (Czech Republic) V Uhlířová	6	6
(Chinese Taipei) C-j Chuang (Japan) K Date-Krumm	2	1
(Romania) A Cadanţu (United States) V Lepchenko	4	6	[10]
(United States) J Craybas (France) C Garcia	6	3	[7]
WC	(South Korea) J-h Choi (South Korea) N-y Jun	4	2
(Austria) T Paszek (Czech Republic) K Zakopalová	6	6
(Russia) K Lykina (Spain) C Suárez Navarro	2	3
4	(Russia) V Dushevina (Poland) A Rosolska	6	6
(Greece) E Daniilidou (United States) M Moulton-Levy	6	6
(Japan) R Fujiwara (Thailand) N Lertcheewakarn	2	4
(Uzbekistan) A Amanmuradova (United States) V King	5	6	[10]
2	(Spain) A Medina Garrigues (India) S Mirza	7	4	[7]

Quarterfinals
1	(United States) R Kops-Jones (United States) A Spears	6	5	[10]
(Croatia) D Jurak (Hungary) K Marosi	2	7	[8]
3	(South Africa) N Grandin (Czech Republic) V Uhlířová	7^{7}	6
(Romania) A Cadanţu (United States) V Lepchenko	6^{5}	3
(Austria) T Paszek (Czech Republic) K Zakopalová	6	3	[10]
4	(Russia) V Dushevina (Poland) A Rosolska	3	6	[5]
(Greece) E Daniilidou (United States) M Moulton-Levy	4	6	[4]
(Uzbekistan) A Amanmuradova (United States) V King	6	4	[10]

Semifinals
1	(United States) R Kops-Jones (United States) A Spears	6	6
3	(South Africa) N Grandin (Czech Republic) V Uhlířová	3	3
(Austria) T Paszek (Czech Republic) K Zakopalová	7^{10}	2	[10]
(Uzbekistan) A Amanmuradova (United States) V King	6^{8}	6	[12]

Final
1	(United States) R Kops-Jones (United States) A Spears	2	6	[10]
(Uzbekistan) A Amanmuradova (United States) V King	6	2	[8]
