= 2010 Korea Open – Singles =

Singles
- 2010 Korea Open

Final
- Champions: (Russia) Alisa Kleybanova
- Runners-up: (Czech Republic) Klára Zakopalová
- Score: 6–1, 6–3

Details
- Draw: 32
- Seeds: 8

Events
| Singles | Doubles |
| ← 2009 · | Korea Open | · 2011 → |

Kimiko Date-Krumm was the defending champion, but subsequently fell to 8th seed Ágnes Szávay in the quarterfinals.
5th seed Alisa Kleybanova emerged as the new champion, beating out Czech Klára Zakopalová in the final, 6-1, 6-3.

== Seeds ==
1. (Russia) Nadia Petrova (semifinals, retired due to illness)
2. (Russia) Anastasia Pavlyuchenkova (second round)
3. (Russia) Maria Kirilenko (second round)
4. (Spain) María José Martínez Sánchez (second round)
5. (Russia) Alisa Kleybanova (champion)
6. (Kazakhstan) Yaroslava Shvedova (second round)
7. (Serbia) Ana Ivanovic (first round)
8. (Hungary) Ágnes Szávay (semifinals)

== Draw ==
=== Key ===
- Q = Qualifier
- WC = Wild card
- LL = Lucky loser
- Alt = Alternate
- SE = Special exempt
- PR = Protected ranking
- ITF = ITF entry
- JE = Junior exempt
- w/o = Walkover
- r = Retired
- d = Defaulted
- SR = Special ranking

=== Finals ===
Semifinals
1 | (Russia) Nadia Petrova | 4^{r}
(Czech Republic) Klára Zakopalová | 5
5 | (Russia) Alisa Kleybanova | 6 | 6
8 | (Hungary) Ágnes Szávay | 3 | 2

Final
(Czech Republic) Klára Zakopalová | 1 | 3
5 | (Russia) Alisa Kleybanova | 6 | 6

=== Top half ===
First round
1 | (Russia) N Petrova | 6 | 6
(Australia) J Groth | 3 | 2
(Italy) A Brianti | 4 | 5
(United States) V King | 6 | 7
(Belgium) K Flipkens | 2 | 6 | 6
Q | (Serbia) B Jovanovski | 6 | 3 | 4
(Spain) A Medina Garrigues | 4 | 5
6 | (Kazakhstan) Y Shvedova | 6 | 7
3 | (Russia) M Kirilenko | 6 | 6
(Poland) U Radwańska | 3 | 1
WC | (Russia) D Safina | 6 | 6
Q | (Romania) S Halep | 4 | 4
(Germany) J Görges | 5 | 6 | 5
(Czech Republic) K Zakopalová | 7 | 2 | 7
(Russia) V Dushevina | 2 | 6 | 6
7/WC | (Serbia) A Ivanovic | 6 | 4 | 2

Second round
1 | (Russia) N Petrova | 6 | 6
(United States) V King | 3 | 4
(Belgium) K Flipkens | 6 | 6
6 | (Kazakhstan) Y Shvedova | 4 | 1
3 | (Russia) M Kirilenko | 2 | 3
WC | (Russia) D Safina | 6 | 6
(Czech Republic) K Zakopalová | 6 | 7
(Russia) V Dushevina | 4 | 6^{5}

Quarterfinals
1 | (Russia) N Petrova | 6 | 6
(Belgium) K Flipkens | 2 | 1
WC | (Russia) D Safina | 5 | 3
(Czech Republic) K Zakopalová | 7 | 6

Semifinals
1 | (Russia) N Petrova | 4^{r}
(Czech Republic) K Zakopalová | 5

=== Bottom half ===
First round
5 | (Russia) A Kleybanova | 6 | 6
(Chinese Taipei) K-c Chang | 2 | 3
(Russia) K Pervak | 6 | 7
(Chinese Taipei) Y-j Chan | 4 | 5
(Czech Republic) I Benešová | 2 | 6 | 5
(Russia) E Makarova | 6 | 3 | 7
Q | (Chinese Taipei) S-w Hsieh | 6^{3} | 4
4 | (Spain) MJ Martínez Sánchez | 7 | 6
8 | (Hungary) Á Szávay | 6 | 6
(Slovenia) P Hercog | 1 | 2
WC | (South Korea) S-j Kim | 3 | 4
(United Kingdom) E Baltacha | 6 | 6
(Japan) K Date-Krumm | 6 | 7
Q | (Japan) J Namigata | 2 | 5
(Australia) A Rodionova | 6^{6} | 1
2 | (Russia) A Pavlyuchenkova | 7 | 6

Second round
5 | (Russia) A Kleybanova | 6^{13} | 6 | 6
(Russia) K Pervak | 7 | 1 | 2
(Russia) E Makarova | 6 | 7
4 | (Spain) MJ Martínez Sánchez | 4 | 5
8 | (Hungary) Á Szávay | 6 | 7
(United Kingdom) E Baltacha | 3 | 5
(Japan) K Date-Krumm | 6 | 6
2 | (Russia) A Pavlyuchenkova | 2 | 1

Quarterfinals
5 | (Russia) A Kleybanova | 6 | 6
(Russia) E Makarova | 1 | 2
8 | (Hungary) Á Szávay | 6 | 6^{3} | 6
(Japan) K Date-Krumm | 2 | 7 | 3

Semifinals
5 | (Russia) A Kleybanova | 6 | 6
8 | (Hungary) Á Szávay | 3 | 2
