= 2014 Korea Open – Singles =

Singles
- 2014 Korea Open

Final
- Champion: (Czech Republic) Karolína Plíšková
- Runner-up: (United States) Varvara Lepchenko
- Score: 6–3, 6–7^{(5–7)}, 6–2

Details
- Draw: 32
- Seeds: 8

Events
| Singles | Doubles |
| ← 2013 · | Korea Open | · 2015 → |

Karolína Plíšková defeated Varvara Lepchenko in the final, 6–3, 6–7^{(5–7)}, 6–2 to win the women's singles tennis title at the 2014 Korea Open.

Agnieszka Radwańska was the defending champion, but lost to Lepchenko in the quarterfinals.

== Seeds ==
1. (Poland) Agnieszka Radwańska (quarterfinals)
2. (Czech Republic) Karolína Plíšková (champion)
3. (Czech Republic) Klára Koukalová (second round)
4. (Slovakia) Magdaléna Rybáriková (quarterfinals, retired due to a hip injury)
5. (United States) Varvara Lepchenko (final)
6. (Estonia) Kaia Kanepi (quarterfinals)
7. (France) Caroline Garcia (first round)
8. (United Kingdom) Heather Watson (first round)

== Draw ==
=== Key ===
- Q = Qualifier
- WC = Wild card
- LL = Lucky loser
- Alt = Alternate
- ITF = ITF entry
- PR = Protected ranking
- SR = Special ranking
- SE = Special exempt
- JE = Junior exempt
- JR = Junior Accelerator Programme entrant
- CO = College Accelerator Programme entrant
- NG = Next Gen Accelerator Program entrant
- w/o = Walkover
- r = Retired
- d = Defaulted

=== Finals ===
Semifinals
5 | (United States) Varvara Lepchenko | 3 | 6 | 7^{7}
(United States) Christina McHale | 6 | 1 | 6^{5}
WC | (Russia) Maria Kirilenko | 6 | 6^{5} | 3
2 | (Czech Republic) Karolína Plíšková | 4 | 7^{7} | 6

Final
5 | (United States) Varvara Lepchenko | 3 | 7^{7} | 2
2 | (Czech Republic) Karolína Plíšková | 6 | 6^{5} | 6

=== Top half ===
First round
1 | (Poland) A Radwańska | 6 | 6
(Slovenia) P Hercog | 3 | 3
(South Africa) C Scheepers | 6 | 3 | 7
(Romania) I-C Begu | 2 | 6 | 5
WC | (South Korea) N-l Han | 7^{7} | 4 | 6
WC | (South Korea) S-j Jang | 6^{5} | 6 | 3
(Australia) O Rogowska | 1 | 2
5 | (United States) V Lepchenko | 6 | 6
4 | (Slovakia) M Rybáriková | 6 | 3 | 6
(Italy) F Schiavone | 4 | 6 | 2
Q | (Luxembourg) M Minella | 6 | 4 | 4
(Belgium) Y Wickmayer | 2 | 6 | 6
(United States) C McHale | 6 | 6
(Spain) L Arruabarrena | 2 | 3
(Germany) M Barthel | 7^{7} | 6
7 | (France) C Garcia | 6^{3} | 2

Second round
1 | (Poland) A Radwańska | 6 | 6
(South Africa) C Scheepers | 0 | 0
WC | (South Korea) N-l Han | 5 | 1
5 | (United States) V Lepchenko | 7 | 6
4 | (Slovakia) M Rybáriková | 6 | 6
(Belgium) Y Wickmayer | 2 | 2
(United States) C McHale | 6 | 4 | 6
(Germany) M Barthel | 1 | 6 | 3

Quarterfinals
1 | (Poland) A Radwańska | 7^{7} | 2 | 2
5 | (United States) V Lepchenko | 6^{4} | 6 | 6
4 | (Slovakia) M Rybáriková | 2 | 0^{r}
(United States) C McHale | 6 | 2

Semifinals
5 | (United States) V Lepchenko | 3 | 6 | 7^{7}
(United States) C McHale | 6 | 1 | 6^{5}

=== Bottom half ===
First round
6 | (Estonia) K Kanepi | 6 | 6
Q | (Russia) E Kulichkova | 2 | 4
(Czech Republic) Kr Plíšková | 6 | 7^{7}
(Switzerland) S Vögele | 3 | 6^{4}
WC | (Russia) M Kirilenko | 3 | 6 | 6
(Croatia) D Vekić | 6 | 2 | 4
(Netherlands) K Bertens | 0 | 6 | 4
3 | (Czech Republic) K Koukalová | 6 | 4 | 6
8 | (United Kingdom) H Watson | 5 | 2
Q | (United States) N Gibbs | 7 | 6
(Slovakia) A Schmiedlová | 7^{9} | 4 | 6^{3}
Q | (Montenegro) D Kovinić | 6^{7} | 6 | 7^{7}
(Germany) A-L Friedsam | 7^{7} | 7
(Kazakhstan) Y Shvedova | 6^{5} | 5
(Israel) J Glushko | 1 | 2
2 | (Czech Republic) Ka Plíšková | 6 | 6

Second round
6 | (Estonia) K Kanepi | 3 | 6 | 6
(Czech Republic) Kr Plíšková | 6 | 3 | 2
WC | (Russia) M Kirilenko | 6^{4} | 6 | 6
3 | (Czech Republic) K Koukalová | 7^{7} | 4 | 0
Q | (United States) N Gibbs | 1 | 6 | 7^{7}
Q | (Montenegro) D Kovinić | 6 | 4 | 6^{5}
(Germany) A-L Friedsam | 4 | 7^{7} | 2
2 | (Czech Republic) Ka Plíšková | 6 | 6^{5} | 6

Quarterfinals
6 | (Estonia) K Kanepi | 7^{7} | 2 | 3
WC | (Russia) M Kirilenko | 6^{3} | 6 | 6
Q | (United States) N Gibbs | 3 | 4
2 | (Czech Republic) Ka Plíšková | 6 | 6

Semifinals
WC | (Russia) M Kirilenko | 6 | 6^{5} | 3
2 | (Czech Republic) Ka Plíšková | 4 | 7^{7} | 6

== Qualifying ==
=== Seeds ===
1. (United States) Nicole Gibbs (qualified)
2. (Montenegro) Danka Kovinić (qualified)
3. (Luxembourg) Mandy Minella (qualified)
4. (United States) Grace Min (first round)
5. (Japan) Hiroko Kuwata (second round)
6. (Czech Republic) Renata Voráčová (qualifying competition)
7. (Slovenia) Nastja Kolar (qualifying competition)
8. (Russia) Elizaveta Kulichkova (qualified)

=== Qualifiers ===
1. (United States) Nicole Gibbs
2. (Montenegro) Danka Kovinić
3. (Luxembourg) Mandy Minella
4. (Russia) Elizaveta Kulichkova

=== Qualifying draw ===
==== First qualifier ====
First round
WC | (Japan) Naoko Eto | 0 | 0
WC | (South Korea) Lee So-ra | 6 | 6
WC | (South Korea) Kim Da-hye | 6 | 6
WC | (South Korea) Lee Se-jin | 3 | 1
WC | (South Korea) Park Sang-hee | 1 | 0
7 | (Slovenia) Nastja Kolar | 6 | 6

Second round
1 | (United States) Nicole Gibbs | 6 | 6
WC | (South Korea) Lee So-ra | 1 | 3
WC | (South Korea) Kim Da-hye | 4 | 2
7 | (Slovenia) Nastja Kolar | 6 | 6

Qualifying competition
1 | (United States) Nicole Gibbs | 6 | 6
7 | (Slovenia) Nastja Kolar | 2 | 3

==== Second qualifier ====
First round
2 | (Montenegro) Danka Kovinić | 6 | 6
WC | (United States) Megan Moulton-Levy | 1 | 1
WC | (South Korea) Choi Su-yeon | 1 | 1
(Japan) Erika Sema | 6 | 6
(Romania) Elena Bogdan | 6 | 0 | 4
(China) Han Xinyun | 4 | 6 | 6
(Chinese Taipei) Hsu Wen-hsin | 6 | 3 | 6^{1}
6 | (Czech Republic) Renata Voráčová | 2 | 6 | 7^{7}

Second round
2 | (Montenegro) Danka Kovinić | 6 | 6
(Japan) Erika Sema | 2 | 1
(China) Han Xinyun | 3 | 2
6 | (Czech Republic) Renata Voráčová | 6 | 6

Qualifying competition
2 | (Montenegro) Danka Kovinić | 0 | 7^{7} | 6
6 | (Czech Republic) Renata Voráčová | 6 | 6^{3} | 4

==== Third qualifier ====
First round
3 | (Luxembourg) Mandy Minella | 6 | 6
WC | (South Korea) Choi Ji-hee | 2 | 2
WC | (Croatia) Darija Jurak | 6 | 3 | 5
WC | (South Korea) Hong Seung-yeon | 3 | 6 | 7
(Chinese Taipei) Chan Chin-wei | 2 | 3
WC | (Chinese Taipei) Hsu Chieh-yu | 6 | 6
WC | (South Korea) Kang Seo-kyung | 4 | 5
5 | (Japan) Hiroko Kuwata | 6 | 7

Second round
3 | (Luxembourg) Mandy Minella | 6 | 6
WC | (South Korea) Hong Seung-yeon | 2 | 1
WC | (Chinese Taipei) Hsu Chieh-yu | 6 | 6
5 | (Japan) Hiroko Kuwata | 2 | 2

Qualifying competition
3 | (Luxembourg) Mandy Minella | 7 | 6
WC | (Chinese Taipei) Hsu Chieh-yu | 5 | 1

==== Fourth qualifier ====
First round
4 | (United States) Grace Min | 6 | 2 | 4
(Georgia (country)) Oksana Kalashnikova | 4 | 6 | 6
WC | (South Korea) Jung So-hee | 1 | 2
(Romania) Ana Bogdan | 6 | 6
(Japan) Yuuki Tanaka | 7 | 4 | 7
(Chinese Taipei) Lee Ya-hsuan | 5 | 6 | 5
WC | (South Korea) Ahn Yu-jin | 2 | 3
8 | (Russia) Elizaveta Kulichkova | 6 | 6

Second round
(Georgia (country)) Oksana Kalashnikova | 5 | 6^{4}
(Romania) Ana Bogdan | 7 | 7^{7}
(Japan) Yuuki Tanaka | 0 | 3
8 | (Russia) Elizaveta Kulichkova | 6 | 6

Qualifying competition
(Romania) Ana Bogdan | 3 | 0^{r}
8 | (Russia) Elizaveta Kulichkova | 6 | 2
