= 2014 Wuhan Open – Singles =

Singles
- 2014 Wuhan Open

Final
- Champion: (Czech Republic) Petra Kvitová
- Runner-up: (Canada) Eugenie Bouchard
- Score: 6–3, 6–4

Details
- Draw: 56
- Seeds: 16

Events
Singles	Doubles
- Wuhan Open

Petra Kvitová defeated Eugenie Bouchard in the final, 6–3, 6–4 to win the inaugural singles tennis title at the 2014 Wuhan Open. The final was a rematch of the Wimbledon final earlier that year.

== Seeds ==
The top eight seeds received a bye into the second round.

1. (United States) Serena Williams (second round, retired because of a viral illness)
2. (Romania) Simona Halep (second round)
3. (Czech Republic) Petra Kvitová (champion)
4. (Russia) Maria Sharapova (third round)
5. (Poland) Agnieszka Radwańska (second round)
6. (Canada) Eugenie Bouchard (final)
7. (Germany) Angelique Kerber (quarterfinals)
8. (Denmark) Caroline Wozniacki (semifinals)

9. (Serbia) Ana Ivanovic (first round, retired because of a left thigh injury)
10. (Serbia) Jelena Janković (second round, retired because of a back problem)
11. (Italy) Sara Errani (second round)
12. (Slovakia) Dominika Cibulková (first round, retired because of a left ankle problem)
13. (Russia) Ekaterina Makarova (second round)
14. (Czech Republic) Lucie Šafářová (first round)
15. (Italy) Flavia Pennetta (first round)
16. (Germany) Andrea Petkovic (second round)

Click on the seed number of a player to go to their draw section.

== Draw ==
Key

- Q = Qualifier
- WC = Wild card
- LL = Lucky loser
- Alt = Alternate
- ITF = ITF entry
- PR = Protected ranking
- SR = Special ranking
- SE = Special exempt
- JE = Junior exempt
- JR = Junior Accelerator Programme entrant
- CO = College Accelerator Programme entrant
- NG = Next Gen Accelerator Program entrant
- w/o = Walkover
- r = Retired
- d = Defaulted

=== Finals ===
Quarterfinals
(France) Alizé Cornet	3	5
6	(Canada) Eugenie Bouchard	6	7
Q	(Switzerland) Timea Bacsinszky	6	2	3
8	(Denmark) Caroline Wozniacki	4	6	6
(France) Caroline Garcia	3	4
3	(Czech Republic) Petra Kvitová	6	6
7	(Germany) Angelique Kerber	4	6^{3}
(Ukraine) Elina Svitolina	6	7^{7}

Semifinals
6	(Canada) Eugenie Bouchard	6	6
8	(Denmark) Caroline Wozniacki	2	3
3	(Czech Republic) Petra Kvitová	6	7
(Ukraine) Elina Svitolina	3	5

Final
6	(Canada) Eugenie Bouchard	3	4
3	(Czech Republic) Petra Kvitová	6	6

=== Top half ===
==== Section 1 ====
First round
(France) A Cornet	6	6
PR	(Switzerland) R Oprandi	2	1
Q	(Italy) F Schiavone	6	6^{2}	4
WC	(Belgium) K Flipkens	2	7^{7}	6
Q	(Australia) J Gajdošová	6	6
15	(Italy) F Pennetta	1	4
11	(Italy) S Errani	7	6
(United Kingdom) H Watson	5	4
WC	(China) S Xu	6	4	6^{r}
(United States) A Riske	4	6	6
(Germany) M Barthel	6	7^{7}
(China) S Peng	2	6^{1}

Second round
1	(United States) S Williams	6^{r}
(France) A Cornet	5
WC	(Belgium) K Flipkens	6	3	6
Q	(Australia) J Gajdošová	3	6	3
11	(Italy) S Errani	4	4
(United States) A Riske	6	6
(Germany) M Barthel	6	3	4
6	(Canada) E Bouchard	4	6	6

Third round
(France) A Cornet	7^{7}	1	6
WC	(Belgium) K Flipkens	6^{4}	6	3
(United States) A Riske	2	3
6	(Canada) E Bouchard	6	6

Quarterfinals
(France) A Cornet	3	5
6	(Canada) E Bouchard	6	7

==== Section 2 ====
First round
(Russia) S Kuznetsova	6	6
(Japan) K Nara	3	2
Q	(Switzerland) S Vögele	1	5
Q	(Switzerland) T Bacsinszky	6	7
(Serbia) B Jovanovski	2	2
13	(Russia) E Makarova	6	6
9	(Serbia) A Ivanovic	5	5^{r}
(Russia) A Pavlyuchenkova	7	6
(Italy) R Vinci	5	5
(Australia) C Dellacqua	7	7
(Spain) C Suárez Navarro	7	6
WC	(China) K Zhang	5	4

Second round
4	(Russia) M Sharapova	3	6	6
(Russia) S Kuznetsova	6	2	2
Q	(Switzerland) T Bacsinszky	6	6
13	(Russia) E Makarova	4	1
(Russia) A Pavlyuchenkova	6^{7}	7^{7}	1
(Australia) C Dellacqua	7^{9}	6^{5}	6
(Spain) C Suárez Navarro	1	6	6^{4}
8	(Denmark) C Wozniacki	6	3	7^{7}

Third round
4	(Russia) M Sharapova	6^{3}	5
Q	(Switzerland) T Bacsinszky	7^{7}	7
(Australia) C Dellacqua	0	3
8	(Denmark) C Wozniacki	6	6

Quarterfinals
Q	(Switzerland) T Bacsinszky	6	2	3
8	(Denmark) C Wozniacki	4	6	6

=== Bottom half ===
==== Section 3 ====
First round
(United States) V Williams	4	6	6^{6}
(France) C Garcia	6	4	7^{8}
LL	(Germany) A Beck	3	2
(United States) C Vandeweghe	6	6
(United States) C McHale	4	4
10	(Serbia) J Janković	6	6
16	(Germany) A Petkovic	5	6	6
Q	(Croatia) D Vekić	7	1	2
(Australia) S Stosur	4	4
(Czech Republic) Ka Plíšková	6	6
Q	(Italy) K Knapp	6	2	6
Q	(New Zealand) M Erakovic	4	6	1

Second round
5	(Poland) A Radwańska	6	6^{4}	6^{7}
(France) C Garcia	3	7^{7}	7^{9}
(United States) C Vandeweghe	4
10	(Serbia) J Janković	1^{r}
16	(Germany) A Petkovic	4	4
(Czech Republic) Ka Plíšková	6	6
Q	(Italy) K Knapp	3	0
3	(Czech Republic) P Kvitová	6	6

Third round
(France) C Garcia	6	6
(United States) C Vandeweghe	3	2
(Czech Republic) Ka Plíšková	3	6	4
3	(Czech Republic) P Kvitová	6	2	6

Quarterfinals
(France) C Garcia	3	4
3	(Czech Republic) P Kvitová	6	6

==== Section 4 ====
First round
(Czech Republic) K Koukalová	4	7^{7}	2
Q	(Kazakhstan) Z Diyas	6	6^{1}	6
(Czech Republic) B Záhlavová-Strýcová	7^{7}	7^{7}
(Slovakia) D Hantuchová	6^{5}	6^{2}
(United States) M Keys	4	6	0
12	(Slovakia) D Cibulková	6	3	0^{r}
14	(Czech Republic) L Šafářová	5	6	3
(Germany) S Lisicki	7	2	6
(Ukraine) E Svitolina	6	6
(Italy) C Giorgi	2	3
(Spain) G Muguruza	4	6	6
WC	(Spain) MT Torró Flor	6	4	4

Second round
7	(Germany) A Kerber	4	6	6
Q	(Kazakhstan) Z Diyas	6	2	4
(Czech Republic) B Záhlavová-Strýcová	3	6	6
(United States) M Keys	6	2	2
(Germany) S Lisicki	6^{3}	3
(Ukraine) E Svitolina	7^{7}	6
(Spain) G Muguruza	2	6	6
2	(Romania) S Halep	6	2	3

Third round
7	(Germany) A Kerber	6	6
(Czech Republic) B Záhlavová-Strýcová	1	1
(Ukraine) E Svitolina	w/o
(Spain) G Muguruza

Quarterfinals
7	(Germany) A Kerber	4	6^{3}
(Ukraine) E Svitolina	6	7^{7}

== Qualifying ==
=== Seeds ===
1. (Kazakhstan) Zarina Diyas (qualified)
2. (United States) Varvara Lepchenko (withdrew, still playing in Seoul)
3. (United Kingdom) Heather Watson (moved to main draw)
4. (Bulgaria) Tsvetana Pironkova (first round)
5. (United States) Lauren Davis (first round)
6. (United States) Christina McHale (moved to main draw)
7. (Germany) Annika Beck (qualifying competition; Lucky loser)
8. (Romania) Monica Niculescu (withdrew; still playing in Guangzhou)
9. (Puerto Rico) Monica Puig (first round)
10. (Italy) Karin Knapp (qualified)
11. (Belgium) Yanina Wickmayer (withdrew; still playing in Seoul)
12. (Switzerland) Stefanie Vögele (qualified)
13. (Italy) Francesca Schiavone (qualified)
14. (Switzerland) Timea Bacsinszky (qualified)
15. (Croatia) Ajla Tomljanović (first round)
16. (Spain) Sílvia Soler Espinosa (qualifying competition)
17. (Slovakia) Anna Schmiedlová (qualifying competition)
18. (Slovenia) Polona Hercog (first round)
19. (Belgium) Alison Van Uytvanck (qualifying competition)

=== Qualifiers ===
1. (Kazakhstan) Zarina Diyas
2. (New Zealand) Marina Erakovic
3. (Italy) Francesca Schiavone
4. (Switzerland) Stefanie Vögele
5. (Australia) Jarmila Gajdošová
6. (Italy) Karin Knapp
7. (Croatia) Donna Vekić
8. (Switzerland) Timea Bacsinszky

=== Lucky loser ===
1. (Germany) Annika Beck

=== Qualifying draw ===
==== First qualifier ====
First round
1	(Kazakhstan) Zarina Diyas	7^{7}	6
(Romania) Sorana Cîrstea	6^{1}	4
WC	(China) Zhu Lin	3	5
16	(Spain) Sílvia Soler Espinosa	6	7

Qualifying competition
1	(Kazakhstan) Zarina Diyas	6	6
16	(Spain) Sílvia Soler Espinosa	2	3

==== Second qualifier ====
First round
2	(United States) Varvara Lepchenko
(New Zealand) Marina Erakovic	w/o
WC	(China) Yang Zhaoxuan	6	6
9	(Puerto Rico) Monica Puig	3	2

Qualifying competition
(New Zealand) Marina Erakovic	6	6
WC	(China) Yang Zhaoxuan	3	4

==== Third qualifier ====
First round
19	(Belgium) Alison Van Uytvanck	6	7
(France) Kristina Mladenovic	2	5
Alt	(Australia) Anastasia Rodionova	2	6	6^{4}
13	(Italy) Francesca Schiavone	6	4	7^{7}

Qualifying competition
19	(Belgium) Alison Van Uytvanck	3	6	3
13	(Italy) Francesca Schiavone	6	3	6

==== Fourth qualifier ====
First round
4	(Bulgaria) Tsvetana Pironkova	4	4
Alt	(United States) Bethanie Mattek-Sands	6	6
WC	(China) Tian Ran	7^{8}	4	2
12	(Switzerland) Stefanie Vögele	6^{6}	6	6

Qualifying competition
Alt	(United States) Bethanie Mattek-Sands	4	6	1
12	(Switzerland) Stefanie Vögele	6	3	6

==== Fifth qualifier ====
First round
5	(United States) Lauren Davis	6	3	2
(Australia) Jarmila Gajdošová	0	6	6
WC	(China) Wang Yafan	6	3	3
17	(Slovakia) Anna Schmiedlová	1	6	6

Qualifying competition
(Australia) Jarmila Gajdošová	3	6	6
17	(Slovakia) Anna Schmiedlová	6	1	4

==== Sixth qualifier ====
First round
18	(Slovenia) Polona Hercog	6	3	2
(United States) Nicole Gibbs	3	6	6
Alt	(Russia) Alla Kudryavtseva	7^{7}	3	1
10	(Italy) Karin Knapp	6^{1}	6	6

Qualifying competition
(United States) Nicole Gibbs	4	2
10	(Italy) Karin Knapp	6	6

==== Seventh qualifier ====
First round
7	(Germany) Annika Beck	w/o
(Luxembourg) Mandy Minella
(Croatia) Donna Vekić	6^{4}	6	6
15	(Croatia) Ajla Tomljanović	7^{7}	2	4

Qualifying competition
7	(Germany) Annika Beck	7	1	5
(Croatia) Donna Vekić	5	6	7

==== Eighth qualifier ====
First round
8	(Romania) Monica Niculescu
(Czech Republic) Kristýna Plíšková	w/o
(South Africa) Chanelle Scheepers	3	5
14	(Switzerland) Timea Bacsinszky	6	7

Qualifying competition
(Czech Republic) Kristýna Plíšková	3	3
14	(Switzerland) Timea Bacsinszky	6	6
