= 2014 Korea Open =

- Date: 13–21 September
- Edition: 11th
- Category: WTA International
- Draw: 32S / 16D
- Prize money: $500,000
- Surface: Hard / outdoor
- Location: Seoul, South Korea
- Venue: Seoul Olympic Park Tennis Center

Champions

Singles
- (Czech Republic) Karolína Plíšková

Doubles
- (Spain) Lara Arruabarrena / (Romania) Irina-Camelia Begu
← 2013 ·	Korea Open	· 2015 →

The 2014 Korea Open was a women's professional tennis tournament played on outdoor hard courts. It was the 11th edition of the tournament, which was part of the 2014 WTA Tour. It took place in Seoul, South Korea between 13 September and 21 September 2014. Second-seeded Karolína Plíšková won the singles title.

== Finals ==
=== Singles ===
- (Czech Republic) Karolína Plíšková defeated (United States) Varvara Lepchenko, 6–3, 6–7^{(5–7)}, 6–2
- It was Plíšková's 1st singles title of the year and the 2nd of her career.

=== Doubles ===
- (Spain) Lara Arruabarrena / (Romania) Irina-Camelia Begu defeated (Germany) Mona Barthel / (Luxembourg) Mandy Minella, 6–3, 6–3

== Points and prize money ==
=== Point distribution ===
Event	W	F	SF	QF	Round of 16	Round of 32	Q	Q3	Q2	Q1
Singles	280	180	110	60	30	1	18	14	10	1
Doubles	280	180	110	60	1	—	—	—	—	—

=== Prize money ===
Event	W	F	SF	QF	Round of 16	Round of 32^{1}	Q3	Q2	Q1
Singles	$111,139	$55,335	$29,270	$8,502	$4,770	$3,774	$1,448	$1,052	$764
Doubles	$17,724	$9,222	$4,951	$2,623	$1,383	—	—	—	—
Doubles prize money per team

_{^{1} Qualifiers prize money is also the round of 32 prize money}

== Singles main-draw entrants ==
=== Seeds ===
Country	Player	Rank^{1}	Seed
POL	Agnieszka Radwańska	5	1
CZE	Karolína Plíšková	36	2
CZE	Klára Koukalová	38	3
SVK	Magdaléna Rybáriková	41	4
USA	Varvara Lepchenko	43	5
EST	Kaia Kanepi	45	6
FRA	Caroline Garcia	46	7
GBR	Heather Watson	47	8

- ^{1} Rankings are as of September 8, 2014

=== Other entrants ===
The following players received wildcards into the singles main draw:

- (South Korea) Jang Su-jeong
- (South Korea) Han Na-lae
- (Russia) Maria Kirilenko

The following players received entry from the qualifying draw:

- (United States) Nicole Gibbs
- (Montenegro) Danka Kovinić
- (Russia) Elizaveta Kulichkova
- (Luxembourg) Mandy Minella

=== Withdrawals ===
Before the tournament

- (Czech Republic) Petra Cetkovská → replaced by (Israel) Julia Glushko
- (Russia) Ekaterina Makarova → replaced by (Czech Republic) Kristýna Plíšková
- (Russia) Elena Vesnina → replaced by (Spain) Lara Arruabarrena

=== Retirements ===
- (Slovakia) Magdaléna Rybáriková (left hip injury)

== Doubles main-draw entrants ==
=== Seeds ===
Country	Player	Country	Player	Rank^{1}	Seed
TPE	Chan Hao-ching	TPE	Chan Yung-jan	52	1
CZE	Karolína Plíšková	CZE	Kristýna Plíšková	110	2
CRO	Darija Jurak	USA	Megan Moulton-Levy	115	3
GEO	Oksana Kalashnikova	CZE	Renata Voráčová	143	4

- ^{1} Rankings are as of September 8, 2014

=== Retirements ===
- (Russia) Maria Kirilenko (left abdominal strain)
