= 2011 Korea Open =

- Date: 19–25 September
- Edition: 8th
- Category: WTA International
- Draw: 32S / 16D
- Prize money: $220,000
- Surface: Hard / outdoor
- Location: Seoul, South Korea
- Venue: Seoul Olympic Park Tennis Center

Champions

Singles
- (Spain) María José Martínez Sánchez

Doubles
- (South Africa) Natalie Grandin / (Czech Republic) Vladimíra Uhlířová
← 2010 ·	Korea Open	· 2012 →

The 2011 Korea Open was a women's tennis tournament played on outdoor hard courts. It was the 8th edition of the Korea Open, and was part of the WTA International tournaments of the 2011 WTA Tour. It took place at the Seoul Olympic Park Tennis Center in Seoul, South Korea, from 19 September 25 September 2011. Sixth-seeded María José Martínez Sánchez won the singles title.

== Finals ==
=== Singles ===
(Spain) María José Martínez Sánchez defeated (Kazakhstan) Galina Voskoboeva, 7–6^{(7–0)}, 7–6^{(7–2)}

- It was Martínez Sánchez's 2nd title of the year and 5th of her career, her first coming on hardcourts.

=== Doubles ===
(South Africa) Natalie Grandin / (Czech Republic) Vladimíra Uhlířová defeated (Russia) Vera Dushevina / (Kazakhstan) Galina Voskoboeva 7–6^{(7–5)}, 6–4

== Entrants ==
Country	Player	Rank^{1}	Seed
ITA	Francesca Schiavone	8	1
FRA	Marion Bartoli	10	2
GER	Julia Görges	21	3
SVK	Dominika Cibulková	22	4
SLO	Polona Hercog	35	5
ESP	María José Martínez Sánchez	36	6
ROU	Irina-Camelia Begu	38	7
RUS	Ekaterina Makarova	43	8

- ^{1} Seeds are based on the rankings of September 12.

=== Other entrants ===
The following players received wildcards into the singles main draw:

- (France) Marion Bartoli
- (Slovakia) Dominika Cibulková
- (South Korea) Kim So-jung
- (Italy) Francesca Schiavone

The following players received entry from the qualifying draw:

- (Czech Republic) Kristýna Plíšková
- (Austria) Nicole Rottmann
- (Japan) Yurika Sema
- (Kazakhstan) Yaroslava Shvedova
