= 2014 Korea Open – Doubles =

Doubles
- 2014 Korea Open

Final
- Champions: (Spain) Lara Arruabarrena (Romania) Irina-Camelia Begu
- Runners-up: (Germany) Mona Barthel (Luxembourg) Mandy Minella
- Score: 6–3, 6–3

Details
- Draw: 16
- Seeds: 4

Events
Singles	Doubles
← 2013 ·	Korea Open	· 2015 →

Chan Chin-wei and Xu Yifan were the defending champions but Xu chose to participate at Guangzhou instead. Chan partnered Hsu Chieh-yu, but lost in the semifinals to Mona Barthel and Mandy Minella.

Lara Arruabarrena and Irina-Camelia Begu are the new champions, defeating in the final Mona Barthel and Mandy Minella with the score 6–3, 6–3.

== Seeds ==
1. (Chinese Taipei) Chan Hao-ching / (Chinese Taipei) Chan Yung-jan (first round)
2. (Czech Republic) Karolína Plíšková / (Czech Republic) Kristýna Plíšková (first round)
3. (Croatia) Darija Jurak / (United States) Megan Moulton-Levy (first round)
4. (Georgia (country)) Oksana Kalashnikova / (Czech Republic) Renata Voráčová (quarterfinals)

== Draw ==
=== Key ===
- Q = Qualifier
- WC = Wild card
- LL = Lucky loser
- Alt = Alternate
- SE = Special exempt
- PR = Protected ranking
- ITF = ITF entry
- JE = Junior exempt
- w/o = Walkover
- r = Retired
- d = Defaulted
- SR = Special ranking

=== Draw ===
First round
1	(Chinese Taipei) H-c Chan (Chinese Taipei) Y-j Chan	6^{5}	3
(Germany) M Barthel (Luxembourg) M Minella	7^{7}	6
(South Korea) H-m Lee (South Korea) S-j Lee	1	2
(Romania) E Bogdan (Japan) H Kuwata	6	6
4	(Georgia (country)) O Kalashnikova (Czech Republic) R Voráčová	6	7^{7}
(Romania) A Bogdan (Germany) A-L Friedsam	3	6^{4}
(Israel) J Glushko (Australia) O Rogowska	2	6	[5]
(Chinese Taipei) C-w Chan (Chinese Taipei) C-y Hsu	6	4	[10]
(Montenegro) D Kovinić (Slovakia) A Schmiedlová	2	4
(Russia) A Panova (United Kingdom) H Watson	6	6
(Spain) L Arruabarrena (Romania) I-C Begu	6	6
3	(Croatia) D Jurak (United States) M Moulton-Levy	1	1
(China) X Han (United States) C McHale	6	6
(South Korea) S-y Hong (South Korea) S-k Kang	0	2
(Russia) M Kirilenko (Belgium) Y Wickmayer	6	6
2	(Czech Republic) Ka Plíšková (Czech Republic) Kr Plíšková	4	4

Quarterfinals
(Germany) M Barthel (Luxembourg) M Minella	6	6
(Romania) E Bogdan (Japan) H Kuwata	0	2
4	(Georgia (country)) O Kalashnikova (Czech Republic) R Voráčová	3	2
(Chinese Taipei) C-w Chan (Chinese Taipei) C-y Hsu	6	6
(Russia) A Panova (United Kingdom) H Watson	2	2
(Spain) L Arruabarrena (Romania) I-C Begu	6	6
(China) X Han (United States) C McHale	4	3
(Russia) M Kirilenko (Belgium) Y Wickmayer	6	6

Semifinals
(Germany) M Barthel (Luxembourg) M Minella	4	6	[10]
(Chinese Taipei) C-w Chan (Chinese Taipei) C-y Hsu	6	4	[6]
(Spain) L Arruabarrena (Romania) I-C Begu	7	0
(Russia) M Kirilenko (Belgium) Y Wickmayer	5	0^{r}

Final
(Germany) M Barthel (Luxembourg) M Minella	3	3
(Spain) L Arruabarrena (Romania) I-C Begu	6	6
