= 2011 Korea Open – Singles =

Singles
- 2011 Korea Open

Final
- Champion: (Spain) María José Martínez Sánchez
- Runner-up: (Kazakhstan) Galina Voskoboeva
- Score: 7–6^{(7–0)}, 7–6^{(7–2)}

Details
- Draw: 32
- Seeds: 8

Events
Singles	Doubles
- Korea Open

Alisa Kleybanova, the defending champion, was unable to compete as she was receiving treatment for Hodgkin lymphoma. María José Martínez Sánchez defeated Galina Voskoboeva, 7–6^{(7–0)}, 7–6^{(7–2)}, in the final for her first hardcourt title.

== Seeds ==
1. (Italy) Francesca Schiavone (first round)
2. (France) Marion Bartoli (second round)
3. (Germany) Julia Görges (quarterfinals)
4. (Slovakia) Dominika Cibulková (quarterfinals)
5. (Slovenia) Polona Hercog (semifinals)
6. (Spain) María José Martínez Sánchez (champion)
7. (Romania) Irina-Camelia Begu (second round)
8. (Russia) Ekaterina Makarova (first round)

== Main draw ==
Key

- Q = Qualifier
- WC = Wild card
- LL = Lucky loser
- Alt = Alternate
- ITF = ITF entry
- PR = Protected ranking
- SR = Special ranking
- SE = Special exempt
- JE = Junior exempt
- JR = Junior Accelerator Programme entrant
- CO = College Accelerator Programme entrant
- NG = Next Gen Accelerator Program entrant
- w/o = Walkover
- r = Retired
- d = Defaulted

=== Finals ===
Semifinals
(Kazakhstan) Galina Voskoboeva	6	6
5	(Slovenia) Polona Hercog	1	4
6	(Spain) María José Martínez Sánchez	6	6
(Czech Republic) Klára Zakopalová	3	2

Final
(Kazakhstan) Galina Voskoboeva	6^{0}	6^{2}
6	(Spain) María José Martínez Sánchez	7^{7}	7^{7}

=== Top half ===
First round
1/WC	(Italy) F Schiavone	6^{4}	2
(Russia) V Dushevina	7^{7}	6
(Netherlands) A Rus	6	0	5
(Romania) A Dulgheru	2	6	7
(Czech Republic) I Benešová	6	6
(Belarus) A Yakimova	3	2
(Kazakhstan) G Voskoboeva	6	6
8	(Russia) E Makarova	4	4
4/WC	(Slovakia) D Cibulková	6	7
(Spain) A Parra Santonja	3	5
(Thailand) T Tanasugarn	2	0
Q	(Kazakhstan) Y Shvedova	6	6
(Spain) C Suárez Navarro	6	6
(Czech Republic) E Birnerová	4	4
(Slovakia) Z Kučová	0	2
5	(Slovenia) P Hercog	6	6

Second round
(Russia) V Dushevina	6	6
(Romania) A Dulgheru	3	1
(Czech Republic) I Benešová	4	4
(Kazakhstan) G Voskoboeva	6	6
4/WC	(Slovakia) D Cibulková	7^{7}
Q	(Kazakhstan) Y Shvedova	6^{4}	r
(Spain) C Suárez Navarro	3	5
5	(Slovenia) P Hercog	6	7

Quarterfinals
(Russia) V Dushevina	2	3
(Kazakhstan) G Voskoboeva	6	6
4/WC	(Slovakia) D Cibulková	3	1
5	(Slovenia) P Hercog	6	6

Semifinals
(Kazakhstan) G Voskoboeva	6	6
5	(Slovenia) P Hercog	1	4

=== Bottom half ===
First round
6	(Spain) MJ Martínez Sánchez	6	6
(United States) I Falconi	3	3
Q	(Austria) N Rottmann	1	5
Q	(Czech Republic) Kr Plíšková	6	7
(Greece) E Daniilidou	4	6	7
WC	(South Korea) S-j Kim	6	2	5
Q	(Japan) Y Sema	1	1
3	(Germany) J Görges	6	6
7	(Romania) I-C Begu	6	6
(Uzbekistan) A Amanmuradova	1	3
(Japan) A Morita	3	4
(Czech Republic) K Zakopalová	6	6
(United States) V King	6	6
(Japan) K Date-Krumm	2	2
(Spain) N Llagostera Vives	2	2
2/WC	(France) M Bartoli	6	6

Second round
6	(Spain) MJ Martínez Sánchez	7^{7}	6
Q	(Czech Republic) Kr Plíšková	6^{5}	2
(Greece) E Daniilidou	4	5
3	(Germany) J Görges	6	7
7	(Romania) I-C Begu	1	1
(Czech Republic) K Zakopalová	6	6
(United States) V King	6	7
2/WC	(France) M Bartoli	3	5

Quarterfinals
6	(Spain) MJ Martínez Sánchez	7^{8}	6
3	(Germany) J Görges	6^{6}	1
(Czech Republic) K Zakopalová	6	4	6
(United States) V King	2	6	1

Semifinals
6	(Spain) MJ Martínez Sánchez	6	6
(Czech Republic) K Zakopalová	3	2
