= Lee Ye-ra =

South Korean tennis player

Lee Ye-ra 이예라
- Country (sports): South Korea
- Residence: Kangwon-do, South Korea
- Born: September 14, 1987 (age 39) Gangwon-do, South Korea
- Turned pro: 2004
- Plays: Right (two-handed backhand)
- Prize money: $138,070

Singles
- Career record: 252–138
- Career titles: 10 ITF
- Highest ranking: No. 178 (22 September 2008)

Grand Slam singles results
- Australian Open: Q2 (2008)
- Wimbledon: Q1 (2008)
- US Open: Q2 (2008)

Doubles
- Career record: 99–75
- Career titles: 8 ITF
- Highest ranking: No. 215 (11 February 2008)

Korean name
- Hangul: 이예라
- RR: I Yera
- MR: I Yera

Lee Ye-ra (Korean: 이예라; born 14 September 1987) is a South Korean former tennis player. Her highest singles ranking is world No. 178, achieved in September 2008. Her career-high doubles ranking is world No. 215, reached in February 2008. In her career, she won ten singles and eight doubles titles on tournaments of the ITF Circuit.

Lee reached the second round of the Korea Open in 2013 defeating Daria Gavrilova in the first round, before falling to Anastasia Pavlyuchenkova.

Playing for South Korea in the Fed Cup, Lee has a win–loss record of 12–11.

== ITF Circuit finals ==
$50,000 tournaments
$25,000 tournaments
$10,000 tournaments

=== Singles: 14 (10 titles, 4 runner-ups) ===
Result	No.	Date	Tournament	Surface	Opponent	Score
Win	1.	1 November 2004	ITF Manila, Philippines	Clay (i)	(South Korea) Hee Sun Lyoo-suh	6–3, 6–2
Win	2.	8 November 2004	ITF Manila	Clay (i)	(Indonesia) Ayu Fani Damayanti	6–0, 1–0 ret.
Win	3.	22 February 2005	ITF Bendigo, Australia	Hard	(Australia) Shayna McDowell	6–3, 6–2
Loss	4.	1 May 2007	ITF Incheon, South Korea	Hard	(Russia) Regina Kulikova	3–6, 6–2, 3–6
Loss	5.	19 November 2007	ITF Mount Gambier, Australia	Hard	(Romania) Monica Niculescu	3–6, 1–6
Win	6.	9 November 2009	ITF Manila, Philippines	Hard	(South Korea) Yoo Mi	6–4, 6–6 ret.
Win	7.	26 April 2010	ITF Gimcheon, South Korea	Clay	(South Korea) Kim Na-ri	6–2, 7–5
Win	8.	17 May 2010	ITF Sunchang, South Korea	Hard	(South Korea) Kim Na-ri	7–5, 6–1
Loss	9.	16 May 2011	ITF Goyang, South Korea	Hard	(South Africa) Chanel Simmonds	7–6, 1–6, 6–7
Win	10.	10 June 2013	ITF Gimcheon	Hard	(South Korea) Kim Na-ri	6–7^{(5–7)}, 6–2, 6–0
Win	11.	17 June 2013	ITF Gimcheon	Hard	(South Korea) Yoo Mi	6–2, 2–6, 6–4
Win	12.	16 June 2014	ITF Gimcheon	Hard	(South Korea) Choi Ji-hee	6–2, 6–2
Win	13.	23 June 2014	ITF Gimcheon	Hard	(South Korea) Choi Ji-hee	6–1, 7–5
Loss	14.	31 May 2015	ITF Changwon, South Korea	Hard	(United States) Kristie Ahn	3–6, 2–3 ret.

=== Doubles: 14 (8 titles, 6 runner-ups) ===
Result	No.	Date	Tournament	Surface	Partner	Opponents	Score
Win	1.	1 November 2004	ITF Manila, Philippines	Clay (i)	(South Korea) Kim Hae-sung	(Indonesia) Ayu Fani Damayanti (Indonesia) Septi Mende	7–6^{(7–2)}, 1–6, 6–0
Loss	2.	13 December 2004	ITF Jakarta, Indonesia	Hard	(South Korea) Chang Kyung-mi	(South Korea) Yoo Mi (Russia) Julia Efremova	3–6, 3–6
Loss	3.	13 June 2005	ITF Incheon, South Korea	Hard	(South Korea) Choi Jin-young	(Chinese Taipei) Chan Chin-wei (Chinese Taipei) Hsieh Su-wei	2–6, 6–7
Win	4.	13 February 2007	ITF Melbourne, Australia	Clay	(Chinese Taipei) Hwang I-hsuan	(Japan) Natsumi Hamamura (Japan) Ayumi Morita	6–2, 6–1
Win	5.	6 March 2007	ITF Hamilton, New Zealand	Hard	(Japan) Mari Tanaka	(Australia) Emelyn Starr (Australia) Jenny Swift	6–2, 6–4
Loss	6.	31 March 2008	ITF Pelham, United States	Clay	(Japan) Remi Tezuka	(Czech Republic) Michaela Paštiková (United States) Ahsha Rolle	5–7, 2–6
Win	7.	9 November 2009	ITF Manila, Philippines	Hard	(South Korea) Kim Sun-jung	(South Korea) Yoo Mi (South Korea) Han Na-lae	6–4, 4–6, [10–6]
Loss	8.	23 May 2010	ITF Sunchang, South Korea	Hard	(South Korea) Chang Kyung-mi	(South Korea) Kim Kun-hee (South Korea) Yu Min-hwa	7–6, 4–6, [4–10]
Win	9.	26 November 2012	ITF Bangkok, Thailand	Hard	(South Korea) Kim Na-ri	(Thailand) Napatsakorn Sankaew (Chinese Taipei) Yang Chia-hsien	6–1, 4–6, [10–7]
Loss	10.	3 December 2012	ITF Bangkok, Thailand	Hard	(South Korea) Kim Na-ri	(China) Wang Yafan (China) Xin Wen	5–7, 5–7
Win	11.	10 June 2013	ITF Gimcheon, South Korea	Hard	(South Korea) Kim Na-ri	(South Korea) Jang Su-jeong (Japan) Riko Sawayanagi	6–3, 6–3
Loss	12.	29 May 2014	ITF Changwon, South Korea	Hard	(South Korea) Kim So-jung	(Chinese Taipei) Chuang Chia-jung (Japan) Junri Namigata	6–7, 0–6
Win	13.	16 June 2014	ITF Gimcheon, South Korea	Hard	(South Korea) Kim So-jung	(South Korea) Choi Ji-hee (South Korea) Lee Hye-min	6–3, 6–1
Win	14.	23 June 2014	ITF Gimcheon, South Korea	Hard	(South Korea) Kim So-jung	(South Korea) Choi Ji-hee (Japan) Makoto Ninomiya	7–5, 2–6, [11–9]
