= Hong Hyun-hui =

South Korean tennis player

- Country (sports): South Korea
- Born: 27 December 1991 (age 33)
- Plays: Right (two-handed backhand)
- Prize money: $28,990

Singles
- Career record: 78–67
- Career titles: 1 ITF
- Highest ranking: No. 440 (22 December 2014)

Doubles
- Career record: 53–61
- Career titles: 3 ITF
- Highest ranking: No. 420 (21 September 2015)

Team competitions
- Fed Cup: 0–3

- Hong Hyun-hui
- Hangul: 홍현휘
- RR: Hong Hyeonhwi
- MR: Hong Hyŏnhwi

Hong Hyun-hui (born 27 December 1991) is a South Korean former tennis player.

Hong has a career-high singles ranking of world No. 440, reached on 22 December 2014. She also has a career-high WTA doubles ranking of 420, achieved on 21 September 2015.

Hong received a wildcard into the singles main draw of the 2012 Korea Open where she lost to Galina Voskoboeva in the first round.

Playing for South Korea in Fed Cup, Hong has a win-loss record of 0–3.

== ITF finals ==
Legend
$25,000 tournaments
$10,000 tournaments

=== Singles (1–2) ===
Result	No.	Date	Location	Surface	Opponent	Score
Loss	1.	26 December 2010	Gimcheon, South Korea	Hard	(South Korea) Kim Kun-hee	6–4, 1–6, 3–6
Loss	2.	2 September 2012	Yeongwol, South Korea	Hard	(South Korea) Lee So-ra	4–6, 6–4, 3–6
Win	3.	1 June 2014	Changwon, South Korea	Hard	(Japan) Junri Namigata	2–6, 6–4, 6–3

=== Doubles (3–0) ===
Outcome	No.	Date	Location	Surface	Partner	Opponents	Score
Win	1.	26 December 2010	Gimcheon, South Korea	Hard	(South Korea) Kim Kun-hee	(South Korea) Kim Ji-young (South Korea) Kim Jung-eun	6–4, 7–5
Win	2.	11 April 2011	Incheon, South Korea	Hard	(South Korea) Han Sung-hee	(Chinese Taipei) Kao Shao-yuan (Thailand) Varatchaya Wongteanchai	6–3, 7–6^{(3)}
Win	3.	19 October 2014	Goyang, South Korea	Hard	(South Korea) Lee So-ra	(South Korea) Han Sung-hee (South Korea) Lee Hye-min	6–4, 6–2
