= Korea Open (tennis) =

- 2026 Korea Open

Tournament information
- Founded: 2004; 22 years ago
- Location: Seoul; South Korea
- Venue: Seoul Olympic Park Tennis Center
- Category: WTA 250 (2004-2019, 2022-2023, 2026-), WTA 500 (2024-2025); WTA 125 (2021, indoor); ATP 250 (2022)
- Surface: Hard
- Draw: 32M/16D
- Prize money: $283,347 (2026)
- Website: WTAKoreaOpen.com

Current champions (2026)
- Women's singles: (Australia) Kimberly Birrell
- Women's doubles: (Chinese Taipei) Chan Hao-ching (Chinese Taipei) Wu Fang-hsien

The Korea Open (Korean: 코리아오픈테니스대회) is a professional tennis tournament held in Seoul, South Korea. The women's edition started in 2004 as a WTA International tournament and is played at the Seoul Olympic Park Tennis Center on outdoor hardcourts. The event was a WTA 500-level in 2024 and in 2025 and returned to its previous WTA 250-level in 2026. In 2022 a men's ATP Tour 250 event was also held as the Eugene Korea Open Tennis Championships.

== History ==
The event was sponsored by Hansol Paper until 2011. In 2012 and 2013, it was sponsored by Korea Development Bank. In 2014, Kia Motors was the sponsor. From 2017 until 2024 it was sponsored by KEB Hana Bank, and in 2025 it was presented by Motiva.

In 2020, the tournament was cancelled due to the COVID-19 pandemic. In 2021, it was originally scheduled as a WTA 250 event in September, but was later postponed and rescheduled to December as a WTA 125 tournament and indoor event.

In 2022, the women's edition returned as a WTA Tour 250 event and the sole edition of the men's ATP Tour 250 event also took place. The women's event continued and in 2024 was upgraded to a WTA 500 event, before being downgraded back to WTA 250 in 2026.

== Past finals ==
=== Men's singles ===
Year	Champion	Runner-up	Score
2022	(Japan) Yoshihito Nishioka	(Canada) Denis Shapovalov	6–4, 7–6^{(7–5)}

=== Women's singles ===
Year	Champion	Runner-up	Score
2004	(Russia) Maria Sharapova	(Poland) Marta Domachowska	6–1, 6–1
2005	(Czech Republic) Nicole Vaidišová	(Serbia and Montenegro) Jelena Janković	7–5, 6–3
2006	(Greece) Eleni Daniilidou	(Japan) Ai Sugiyama	6–3, 2–6, 7–6^{(7–3)}
2007	(United States) Venus Williams	(Russia) Maria Kirilenko	6–3, 1–6, 6–4
2008	(Russia) Maria Kirilenko	(Australia) Samantha Stosur	2–6, 6–1, 6–4
2009	(Japan) Kimiko Date-Krumm	(Spain) Anabel Medina Garrigues	6–3, 6–3
2010	(Russia) Alisa Kleybanova	(Czech Republic) Klára Zakopalová	6–1, 6–3
2011	(Spain) María José Martínez Sánchez	(Kazakhstan) Galina Voskoboeva	7–6^{(7–0)}, 7–6^{(7–2)}
2012	(Denmark) Caroline Wozniacki	(Estonia) Kaia Kanepi	6–1, 6–0
2013	(Poland) Agnieszka Radwańska	(Russia) Anastasia Pavlyuchenkova	6–7^{(6–8)}, 6–3, 6–4
2014	(Czech Republic) Karolína Plíšková	(United States) Varvara Lepchenko	6–3, 6–7^{(5–7)}, 6–2
2015	(Romania) Irina-Camelia Begu	(Belarus) Aliaksandra Sasnovich	6–3, 6–1
2016	(Spain) Lara Arruabarrena	(Romania) Monica Niculescu	6–0, 2–6, 6–0
2017	(Latvia) Jeļena Ostapenko	(Brazil) Beatriz Haddad Maia	6–7^{(5–7)}, 6–1, 6–4
2018	(Netherlands) Kiki Bertens	(Australia) Ajla Tomljanović	7–6^{(7–2)}, 4–6, 6–2
2019	(Czech Republic) Karolína Muchová	(Poland) Magda Linette	6–1, 6–1
2020	cancelled due to the COVID-19 pandemic		
↓ WTA 125 tournament ↓
2021	(China) Zhu Lin	(France) Kristina Mladenovic	6–0, 6–4
↓ WTA 250 tournament ↓
2022	Ekaterina Alexandrova	(Latvia) Jeļena Ostapenko	7–6^{(7–4)}, 6–0
2023	(United States) Jessica Pegula	(China) Yuan Yue	6–2, 6–3
↓ WTA 500 tournament ↓
2024	(Brazil) Beatriz Haddad Maia	Daria Kasatkina	1–6, 6–4, 6–1
2025	(Poland) Iga Świątek	Ekaterina Alexandrova	1–6, 7–6^{(7–3)}, 7–5
↓ WTA 250 tournament ↓
2026	(Australia) Kimberly Birrell	(Australia) Maya Joint	6–4, 6–2

=== Men's doubles ===
Year	Champions	Runners-up	Score
2022	(South Africa) Raven Klaasen (United States) Nathaniel Lammons	(Colombia) Nicolás Barrientos (Mexico) Miguel Ángel Reyes-Varela	6–1, 7–5

=== Women's doubles ===
Year	Champions	Runners-up	Score
2004	(South Korea) Jeon Mi-ra (South Korea) Cho Yoon-jeong	(Chinese Taipei) Chuang Chia-jung (Chinese Taipei) Hsieh Su-wei	6–3, 1–6, 7–5
2005	(Chinese Taipei) Chan Yung-jan (Chinese Taipei) Chuang Chia-jung	(United States) Jill Craybas (South Africa) Natalie Grandin	6–2, 6–4
2006	(Spain) Virginia Ruano Pascual (Argentina) Paola Suárez	(Chinese Taipei) Chuang Chia-jung (Argentina) Mariana Díaz Oliva	6–2, 6–3
2007	(Chinese Taipei) Chuang Chia-jung (2) (Chinese Taipei) Hsieh Su-wei	(Greece) Eleni Daniilidou (Germany) Jasmin Wöhr	6–2, 6–2
2008	(Chinese Taipei) Chuang Chia-jung (3) (Chinese Taipei) Hsieh Su-wei (2)	(Russia) Vera Dushevina (Russia) Maria Kirilenko	6–3, 6–0
2009	(Chinese Taipei) Chan Yung-jan (2) (United States) Abigail Spears	(United States) Carly Gullickson (Australia) Nicole Kriz	6–3, 6–4
2010	(Germany) Julia Görges (Slovenia) Polona Hercog	(South Africa) Natalie Grandin (Czech Republic) Vladimíra Uhlířová	6–3, 6–4
2011	(South Africa) Natalie Grandin (Czech Republic) Vladimíra Uhlířová	(Russia) Vera Dushevina (Kazakhstan) Galina Voskoboeva	7–6^{(7–5)}, 6–4
2012	(United States) Raquel Kops-Jones (United States) Abigail Spears (2)	(Uzbekistan) Akgul Amanmuradova (United States) Vania King	2–6, 6–2, [10–8]
2013	(Chinese Taipei) Chan Chin-wei (China) Xu Yifan	(United States) Raquel Kops-Jones (United States) Abigail Spears	7–5, 6–3
2014	(Spain) Lara Arruabarrena (Romania) Irina-Camelia Begu	(Germany) Mona Barthel (Luxembourg) Mandy Minella	6–3, 6–3
2015	(Spain) Lara Arruabarrena (2) (Slovenia) Andreja Klepač	(Netherlands) Kiki Bertens (Sweden) Johanna Larsson	2–6, 6–3, [10-6]
2016	(Sweden) Johanna Larsson (Belgium) Kirsten Flipkens	(Japan) Akiko Omae (Thailand) Peangtarn Plipuech	6–2, 6–3
2017	(Netherlands) Kiki Bertens (Sweden) Johanna Larsson (2)	(Thailand) Luksika Kumkhum (Thailand) Peangtarn Plipuech	6–4, 6–1
2018	(South Korea) Choi Ji-hee (South Korea) Han Na-lae	(Chinese Taipei) Hsieh Shu-ying (Chinese Taipei) Hsieh Su-wei	6–3, 6–2
2019	(Spain) Lara Arruabarrena (3) (Germany) Tatjana Maria	(United States) Hayley Carter (Brazil) Luisa Stefani	7–6^{(9–7)}, 3–6, [10–7]
2020	cancelled due to the COVID-19 pandemic		
↓ WTA 125 tournament ↓
2021	(South Korea) Choi Ji-hee (2) (South Korea) Han Na-lae (2)	(Greece) Valentini Grammatikopoulou (Hungary) Réka Luca Jani	6–4, 6–4
↓ WTA 250 tournament ↓
2022	(France) Kristina Mladenovic (Belgium) Yanina Wickmayer	(United States) Asia Muhammad (United States) Sabrina Santamaria	6–3, 6–2
2023	(Czech Republic) Marie Bouzková (United States) Bethanie Mattek-Sands	(Thailand) Luksika Kumkhum (Thailand) Peangtarn Plipuech	6–2, 6–1
↓ WTA 500 tournament ↓
2024	(United States) Nicole Melichar-Martinez; Liudmila Samsonova	(Japan) Miyu Kato (China) Zhang Shuai	6–1, 6–0
2025	(Czech Republic) Barbora Krejčíková (Czech Republic) Kateřina Siniaková	(Australia) Maya Joint (United States) Caty McNally	6–3, 7–6^{(8–6)}
↓ WTA 250 tournament ↓
2026	(Chinese Taipei) Chan Hao-ching (Chinese Taipei) Wu Fang-hsien	(Chinese Taipei) Lee Ya-hsin (China) Ye Qiuyu	6–2, 6–3

== See also ==
- Eugene Seoul Open, an ATP Challenger 125 event
- Seoul Open, a defunct Grand Prix ATP event
- List of tennis tournaments
