= Kim So-jung (tennis) =

South Korean tennis player (born 1986)

Kim So-Jung
- Country (sports): South Korea
- Residence: Seoul, Korea
- Born: 18 March 1986 (age 39) Seoul
- Height: 1.72 m (5 ft 8 in)
- Plays: Right (two-handed backhand)
- Prize money: $120,411

Singles
- Career record: 216–161
- Career titles: 5 ITF
- Highest ranking: No. 204 (20 September 2010)

Doubles
- Career record: 109–104
- Career titles: 8 ITF
- Highest ranking: No. 233 (17 July 2006)

Kim So-Jung (born 3 March 1986) is a South Korean former tennis player. Her highest WTA singles ranking is 204, which she achieved on 20 September 2010. Her career-high in doubles is 233, which she reached on July 17, 2006. She won silver for the mixed-doubles teams event, defeating the Taiwanese team at the 2009 Universiade Games. She has also played at the Korea Open.

== ITF Circuit finals ==
Legend
$100,000 tournaments
$75,000 tournaments
$50,000 tournaments
$25,000 tournaments
$15,000 tournaments
$10,000 tournaments

=== Singles: 7 (5–2) ===
| Result | W–L | Date | Tournament | Surface | Opponent | Score |
|---|---|---|---|---|---|---|
| Win | 1–0 | 12 April 2004 | ITF Yamaguchi, Japan | Clay | (Chinese Taipei) Chan Chin-wei | 7–6^{(7)}, 6–2 |
| Win | 2–0 | 26 April 2004 | ITF Jakarta, Indonesia | Hard | (Indonesia) Liza Andriyani | 6–2, 6–2 |
| Win | 3–0 | 1 November 2005 | ITF Busan, Korea | Hard | (Russia) Alla Kudryavtseva | 3–6, 6–1, 6–2 |
| Win | 4–0 | 23 March 2009 | ITF Wellington, New Zealand | Hard | (South Korea) Chae Kyung-yee | 4–6, 6–3, 7–5 |
| Loss | 4–1 | 27 April 2009 | ITF Gimcheon, Korea | Hard | (South Korea) Lee Jin-a | 4–6, 5–7 |
| Win | 5–1 | 11 April 2011 | Incheon Open, Korea | Hard | (South Korea) Lee Jin-a | 2–6, 6–3, 6–1 |
| Loss | 5–2 | 29 April 2013 | ITF Seoul, Korea | Hard | (China) Han Xinyun | 2–6, 1–6 |

=== Doubles: 13 (8–5) ===
| Result | W–L | Date | Tournament | Surface | Partner | Opponents | Score |
|---|---|---|---|---|---|---|---|
| Win | 1–0 | 11 September 2005 | ITF Beijing, China | Hard (i) | (Japan) Maki Arai | (Chinese Taipei) Chan Yung-jan (Chinese Taipei) Hwang I-hsuan | 6–4, 6–0 |
| Win | 2–0 | 18 Aug 2008 | ITF Gimhae, Korea | Hard | (Japan) Ayaka Maekawa | (South Korea) Cho Jeong-a (South Korea) Kim Ji-young | 2–6, 6–3, [10–4] |
| Loss | 2–1 | 1 September 2008 | ITF Goyang, Korea | Hard | (Japan) Ayaka Maekawa | (South Korea) Chae Kyung-yee (South Korea) Chang Kyung-mi | 5–7, 6–3, [5–10] |
| Win | 3–1 | 9 March 2009 | ITF North Shore, New Zealand | Hard | (Japan) Ayaka Maekawa | (Australia) Alison Bai (Australia) Renee Binnie | 7–5, 7–6 |
| Win | 4–1 | 16 March 2009 | ITF Hamilton, New Zealand | Hard | (Japan) Ayaka Maekawa | (Indonesia) Jessy Rompies (Thailand) Varatchaya Wongteanchai | 7–5, 6–3 |
| Win | 5–1 | 23 March 2009 | ITF Wellington, New Zealand | Hard | (Japan) Ayaka Maekawa | (South Korea) Chae Kyung-yee (South Korea) Kim Hae-sung | 6–4, 6–4 |
| Loss | 5–2 | 7 September 2009 | ITF Noto, Japan | Carpet | (China) Han Xinyun | (Chinese Taipei) Hsu Wen-hsin (Chinese Taipei) Hwang I-hsuan | 3–6, 6–1, [9–11] |
| Loss | 5–3 | 19 July 2010 | ITF Nonthaburi, Thailand | Hard | (Japan) Remi Tezuka | (Japan) Akiko Yonemura (Japan) Tomoko Yonemura | 2–6, 4–6 |
| Loss | 5–4 | 29 Aug 2011 | ITF Tsukuba, Japan | Hard | (Japan) Erika Takao | (Chinese Taipei) Chan Chin-wei (Chinese Taipei) Hsu Wen-hsin | 1–6, 1–6 |
| Loss | 5–5 | 29 May 2014 | ITF Changwon, Korea | Hard | (South Korea) Lee Ye-ra | (Chinese Taipei) Chuang Chia-jung (Japan) Junri Namigata | 6–7, 0–6 |
| Win | 6–5 | 16 June 2014 | ITF Gimcheon, Korea | Hard | (South Korea) Lee Ye-ra | (South Korea) Choi Ji-hee (South Korea) Lee Hye-min | 6–3, 6–1 |
| Win | 7–5 | 23 June 2014 | ITF Gimcheon, Korea | Hard | (South Korea) Lee Ye-ra | (South Korea) Choi Ji-hee (Japan) Makoto Ninomiya | 7–5, 2–6, [11–9] |
| Win | 8–5 | 30 August 2015 | ITF Gimcheon, Korea | Hard | (South Korea) Hong Seung-yeon | (South Korea) Han Sung-hee (South Korea) Kim Na-ri | 6–4, 6–7^{(1)}, [10–8] |
