= Hyemin Lee =

South Korean entrepreneur (born 1984)

Lee Hye-min
- 이혜민
- Born: May 1984 (age 41); Seoul, South Korea
- Education: Korea University (BA)
- Occupation: Business executive
- Employer: Finda
- Title: CEO of Finda (2015–present)

Lee Hye-min (Korean: 이혜민; born May 1984) is a South Korean entrepreneur. She is co-CEO of Finda, a financial technology company she co-founded in 2015. Previously, Lee founded Glossybox, People & Co., and served as president of Noom Korea.

== Early life and education ==
Lee was born in May 1984 in Seoul, South Korea. Lee graduated from Korea University in 2007 with a Bachelor's degree in Spanish and Spanish Literature. She participated in an exchange program at the Pontifical Catholic University of Chile.

== Career ==
=== 2007–2015 ===
In 2007, Lee became a project manager at STX Corporation.

In 2011, while working at Rocket Internet, she created Glossybox Korea, a subscription-based beauty service delivering cosmetic samples. In 2012, she founded People & Co., an e-commerce platform delivering baby foods and products.

From 2012 to 2015, Lee served as President of Noom Korea, the Korean subsidiary of the health technology company Noom.

Lee became a venture advisor at 500 Global in 2016.

=== 2015–present: Finda ===
In 2015, Lee co-founded Finda with Park Hong-min, whom she had met through 500 Global. The inspiration for Finda came from Lee's personal experience as a freelancer when she was repeatedly rejected for jeonse (전세) housing loans by traditional banks due to her employment status, despite having sufficient income and creditworthiness.

By 2024, Finda had raised 64.4 billion won (approximately US$46.5 million) in funding from JB Financial Group, 500 Global, and other investors. The company had established partnerships with over 70 financial institutions and offered comparison services for more than 300 loan products.

== Personal life ==
Lee is married and has one child as of August 2025.
