= Lee So-ra (tennis) =

South Korean tennis player

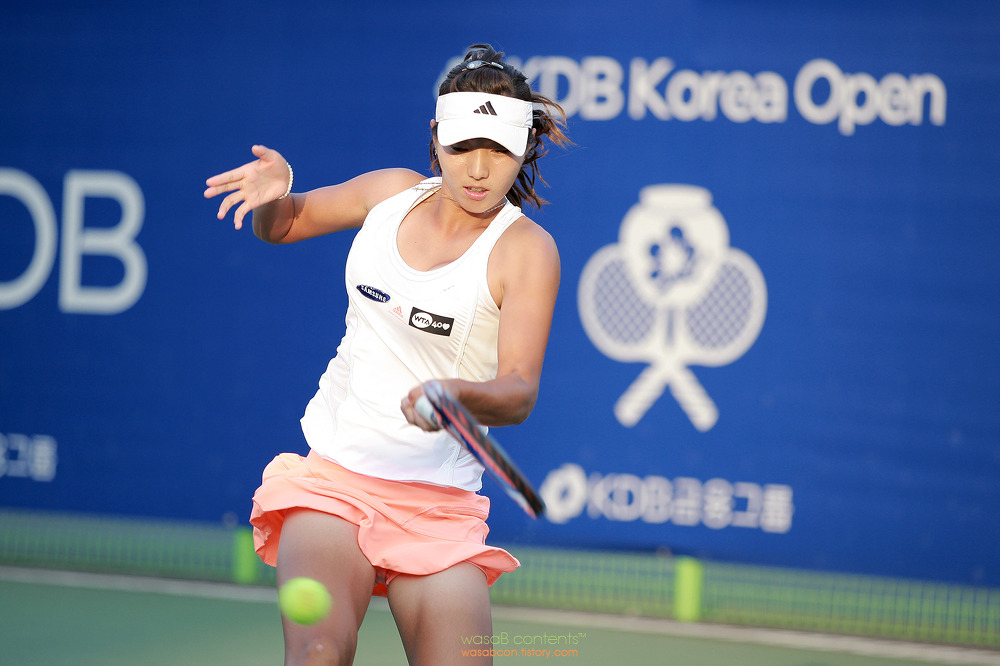
- Lee So-ra, 2014
- Country (sports): South Korea
- Residence: South Korea
- Born: 22 July 1994 (age 32) Wonju, South Korea
- Plays: Left (two-handed backhand)
- Prize money: $109,091

Singles
- Career record: 233–168
- Career titles: 7 ITF
- Highest ranking: No. 247 (23 November 2015)

Doubles
- Career record: 174–121
- Career titles: 16 ITF
- Highest ranking: No. 265 (2 May 2016)

Team competitions
- Fed Cup: 5–9

Lee So-ra (Korean: 이소라; born 22 July 1994) is a South Korean former tennis player. She won seven singles titles and 16 doubles titles on the ITF Women's Circuit.

On 23 November 2015, Lee reached her career-high singles ranking of world No. 247. On 2 May 2016, she peaked at No. 265 in the WTA doubles rankings. She advanced for the first time in her career to the second round of a WTA Tour event at the 2012 Hansol Korea Open, after Maria Kirilenko retired at 1–1 in their first-round match.

== ITF Circuit finals ==
Legend
$60,000 tournaments
$25,000 tournaments
$10/15,000 tournaments

=== Singles: 9 (7 titles, 2 runner-ups) ===
Result	W–L	Date	Tournament	Tier	Surface	Opponent	Score
Win	1–0	Sep 2012	ITF Yeongwol, South Korea	10,000	Hard	(South Korea) Hong Hyun-hui	6–4, 4–6, 6–3
Loss	1–1	May 2014	ITF Seoul, South Korea	10,000	Hard	(Czech Republic) Kateřina Vaňková	7–5, 5–7, 5–7
Win	2–1	Jul 2014	ITF Gimcheon, South Korea	10,000	Hard	(South Korea) Han Na-lae	7–6^{(2)}, 2–6, 6–4
Win	3–1	Jun 2015	ITF Goyang, South Korea	25,000	Hard	(Japan) Risa Ozaki	6–4, 3–6, 6–4
Win	4–1	Jun 2015	ITF Gwangju, South Korea	10,000	Hard	(South Korea) Hong Seung-yeon	6–1, 6–2
Win	5–1	Jul 2015	ITF Hong Kong, China SAR	10,000	Hard	(China) Xu Shilin	6–4, 4–6, 6–2
Win	6–1	Aug 2015	ITF Gimcheon, South Korea	10,000	Hard	(Japan) Makoto Ninomiya	6–2, 6–3
Win	7–1	Mar 2018	ITF Nishitama, Japan	15,000	Hard	(South Korea) Kim Na-ri	6–3, 2–6, 7–5
Loss	7–2	Sep 2018	ITF Yeongwol, South Korea	15,000	Hard	(South Korea) Jeong Su-nam	2–6, 1–6

=== Doubles: 30 (16 titles, 14 runner-ups) ===
Result	W–L	Date	Tournament	Tier	Surface	Partner	Opponents	Score
Win	1–0	May 2011	ITF Hyderabad, India	10k	Clay	(South Korea) Han Na-lae	(India) Sowjanya Bavisetti (India) Natasha Palha	6–3, 6–2
Loss	1–1	May 2012	ITF Tarakan, Indonesia	25k	Hard (i)	(Vietnam) Huỳnh Trang	(Japan) Chiaki Okadaue (Japan) Yurika Sema	4–6, 6–7^{(4)}
Win	2–1	Mar 2013	ITF Bundaberg, Australia	25k	Clay	(South Korea) Jang Su-jeong	(Japan) Miki Miyamura (Thailand) Varatchaya Wongteanchai	7–6^{(4)}, 4–6, [10–8]
Loss	2–2	Feb 2014	ITF Salisbury, Australia	10k	Hard	(South Korea) Jang Su-jeong	(Japan) Miki Miyamura (Japan) Misa Eguchi	2–6, 2–6
Win	3–2	Mar 2014	ITF Mildura, Australia	10k	Grass	(South Korea) Jang Su-jeong	(Australia) Jessica Moore (Bulgaria) Aleksandrina Naydenova	6–1, 1–6, [10–4]
Win	4–2	Sep 2014	ITF Yeongwol, Korea	10k	Hard	(South Korea) Choi Ji-hee	(China) Liang Chen (China) Liu Chang	6–2, 7–5
Win	5–2	Oct 2014	ITF Goyang, Korea	25k	Hard	(South Korea) Hong Hyun-hui	(South Korea) Han Sung-hee (South Korea) Lee Hye-min	6–4, 6–2
Win	6–2	Jul 2015	ITF Hong Kong	10k	Hard	(South Korea) Choi Ji-hee	(Hong Kong) Eudice Chong (Hong Kong) Katherine Ip	6–2, 6–2
Win	7–2	Aug 2015	ITF Hong Kong	10k	Hard	(South Korea) Choi Ji-hee	(China) Gai Ao (China) Sheng Yuqi	6–1, 6–1
Win	8–2	Sep 2015	ITF Noto, Japan	25k	Hard	(South Korea) Jang Su-jeong	(Japan) Chiaki Okadaue (Japan) Kyōka Okamura	6–3, 2–6, [10–8]
Loss	8–3	Jun 2017	ITF Sangju, Korea	15k	Hard	(South Korea) Kim Da-bin	(South Korea) Choi Ji-hee (South Korea) Kang Seo-kyung	6–7^{(3)}, 3–6
Loss	8–4	Jun 2017	ITF Gimcheon, Korea	15k	Hard	(South Korea) Kim Da-bin	(South Korea) Han Sung-hee (South Korea) Hong Seung-yeon	6–3, 4–6, [5–10]
Loss	8–5	Jun 2017	ITF Gimcheon, Korea	15k	Hard	(South Korea) Kim Da-bin	(South Korea) Choi Ji-hee (South Korea) Kang Seo-kyung	4–6, 2–6
Loss	8–6	Sep 2017	ITF Yeongwol, Korea	15k	Hard	(South Korea) Kim Da-bin	(South Korea) Kim Na-ri (Chinese Taipei) Lee Pei-chi	1–6, 5–7
Win	9–6	Mar 2018	ITF Nishitama, Japan	15k	Hard	(South Korea) Kim Na-ri	(Japan) Chisa Hosonuma (Japan) Kanako Morisaki	6–4, 7–5
Win	10–6	May 2018	ITF Goyang, Korea	25k	Hard	(South Korea) Han Na-lae	(Norway) Ulrikke Eikeri (Japan) Akiko Omae	6–2, 5–7, [10–2]
Win	11–6	May 2018	ITF Changwon, Korea	25k	Hard	(South Korea) Kim Na-ri	(South Korea) Kim Da-bin (South Korea) Yu Min-hwa	6–1, 6–1
Loss	11–7	Jun 2018	ITF Singapore	25k	Hard	(South Korea) Han Na-lae	(Japan) Haruka Kaji (Japan) Akiko Omae	5–7, 2–6
Win	12–7	Sep 2018	ITF Yeongwol, Korea	15k	Hard	(South Korea) Kim Da-bin	(South Korea) Bae Do-hee (South Korea) Hong Seung-yeon	6–2, 7–5
Loss	12–8	Nov 2018	Liuzhou Open, China	60k	Hard	(China) Kang Jiaqi	(Hong Kong) Eudice Chong (China) Ye Qiuyu	5–7, 3–6
Loss	12–9	Apr 2019	ITF Kashiwa, Japan	W25	Hard	(Chinese Taipei) Lee Ya-hsuan	(Japan) Kanako Morisaki (Japan) Minori Yonehara	6–4, 2–6, [5–10]
Loss	12–10	May 2019	ITF Goyang, Korea	W25	Hard	(South Korea) Kim Na-ri	(Chinese Taipei) Hsu Chieh-yu (South Africa) Chanel Simmonds	1–6, 3–6
Loss	12–11	Jun 2019	ITF Gimcheon, Korea	W15	Hard	(South Korea) Jung So-hee	(Japan) Kanako Morisaki (Japan) Ayaka Okuno	7–6^{(5)}, 0–6, [2–10]
Win	13–11	Mar 2021	ITF Antalya, Turkiye	W15	Clay	(South Korea) Han Na-lae	(United States) Jessie Aney (South Korea) Park So-hyun	4–6, 7–5, [10–4]
Win	14–11	Apr 2021	ITF Antalya, Turkiye	W15	Clay	(South Korea) Jang Su-jeong	(Colombia) María Paulina Pérez (Mexico) María Portillo Ramírez	6–2, 2–6, [10–7]
Win	15–11	Apr 2021	ITF Antalya, Turkiye	W15	Clay	(Japan) Misaki Matsuda	(Czech Republic) Lucie Havlíčková (Czech Republic) Miriam Kolodziejová	6–2, 6–3
Loss	15–12	Apr 2021	ITF Antalya, Turkiye	W15	Clay	(Japan) Misaki Matsuda	(Israel) Shavit Kimchi (Hungary) Adrienn Nagy	7–5, 2–6, [8–10]
Loss	15–13	Apr 2021	ITF Antalya, Turkiye	W15	Clay	(Japan) Misaki Matsuda	(Australia) Olivia Gadecki (Burundi) Sada Nahimana	3–6, 6–1, [9–11]
Loss	15–14	Nov 2021	ITF Sharm El Sheik, Egypt	W15	Hard	(Russia) Anna Ureke	(Indonesia) Priska Madelyn Nugroho (Netherlands) Stéphanie Visscher	4–6, 6–7^{(0)}
Win	16–14	Sep 2022	ITF Yeongwol, Korea	W15	Hard	(South Korea) Kim Da-bin	(South Korea) Back Da-yeon (South Korea) Lee Eun-hye	6–4, 3–6, [12–10]
