= Hong Seung-yeon =

South Korean tennis player

- Country (sports): South Korea
- Born: 17 April 1992 (age 34)
- Plays: Right-handed (two-handed backhand)
- Prize money: $41,975

Singles
- Career record: 132–121
- Career titles: 1 ITF
- Highest ranking: No. 536 (22 May 2017)

Doubles
- Career record: 90–84
- Career titles: 7 ITF
- Highest ranking: No. 407 (21 September 2015)

- Hong Seung-yeon
- Hangul: 홍승연
- RR: Hong Seungyeon
- MR: Hong Sŭngyŏn

Hong Seung-yeon (born 17 April 1992) is a South Korean former tennis player.

She has career-high WTA rankings of 536 in singles, achieved on 22 May 2017, and 407 in doubles, reached on 21 September 2015.

Hong made her WTA Tour main-draw debut at the 2010 Korea Open doubles tournament where she partnered Han Sung-hee, losing in the first round.

== ITF Circuit finals ==
Legend
$50,000 tournaments
$25,000 tournaments
$15,000 tournaments
$10,000 tournaments

=== Singles: 2 (1 title, 1 runner-up) ===
| Result | W–L | Date | Tournament | Surface | Opponent | Score |
|---|---|---|---|---|---|---|
| Loss | 0–1 | 28 June 2015 | ITF Gwangju, South Korea | Hard | (South Korea) Lee So-ra | 1–6, 2–6 |
| Win | 1–1 | 4 September 2016 | ITF Yeongwol, South Korea | Hard | (South Korea) Kim Da-bin | 7–5, 6–3 |

=== Doubles: 14 (7 titles, 7 runner-ups) ===
| Result | No. | Date | Tournament | Surface | Partner | Opponents | Score |
|---|---|---|---|---|---|---|---|
| Win | 1. | 2 September 2013 | ITF Yeongwol, South Korea | Hard | (South Korea) Lee Hye-min | (Indonesia) Lavinia Tananta (Indonesia) Ayu-Fani Damayanti | 5–7, 6–2, [10–5] |
| Win | 2. | 2 December 2013 | ITF Hong Kong | Hard | (South Korea) Lee Hye-min | (Chinese Taipei) Hsieh Shu-ying (Chinese Taipei) Yang Chia-hsien | 6–1, 7–6^{(2)} |
| Loss | 1. | 16 December 2013 | ITF Hong Kong | Hard | (South Korea) Kang Seo-kyung | (South Korea) Choi Ji-hee (Japan) Akari Inoue | 6–4, 1–6, [7–10] |
| Loss | 2. | 25 August 2014 | ITF Yeongwol, Korea | Hard | (South Korea) Kang Seo-kyung | (South Korea) Kim Na-ri (South Korea) Lee Hye-min | 6–4, 4–6, [9–11] |
| Loss | 3. | 27 December 2014 | ITF Hong Kong | Hard | (South Korea) Kang Seo-kyung | (China) Yang Zhaoxuan (China) Ye Qiuyu | 4–6, 3–6 |
| Loss | 4. | 18 May 2015 | ITF Seoul, Korea | Hard | (South Korea) Kang Seo-kyung | (Chinese Taipei) Chan Chin-wei (Chinese Taipei) Lee Ya-hsuan | 2–6, 1–6 |
| Loss | 5. | 28 June 2015 | ITF Gwangju, Korea | Hard | (South Korea) Kim Ju-eun | (South Korea) Kim Na-ri (South Korea) Choi Ji-hee | 1–6, 6–1, [5–10] |
| Win | 3. | 24 August 2015 | ITF Gimcheon, Korea | Hard | (South Korea) Kim So-jung | (South Korea) Kim Na-ri (South Korea) Han Sung-hee | 6–4, 6–7^{(1)}, [10–8] |
| Win | 4. | 31 August 2015 | ITF Yeongwol, Korea | Hard | (South Korea) Han Sung-hee | (China) You Xiaodi (China) Zhang Yukun | 7–5, 3–6, [10–7] |
| Loss | 6. | 15 July 2016 | ITF Gimcheon, Korea | Hard | (South Korea) Kang Seo-kyung | (Indonesia) Jessy Rompies (Japan) Ayano Shimizu | 2–6, 5–7 |
| Win | 5. | 12 May 2017 | ITF Changwon, Korea | Hard | (South Korea) Kang Seo-kyung | (South Korea) Kim Na-ri (South Korea) Choi Ji-hee | 6–4, 6–3 |
| Win | 6. | 9 June 2017 | ITF Gimcheon, Korea | Hard | (South Korea) Han Sung-hee | (South Korea) Kim Da-bin (South Korea) Lee So-ra | 3–6, 6–4, [10–5] |
| Loss | 7. | 8 September 2018 | ITF Yeongwol, Korea | Hard | (South Korea) Bae Do-hee | (South Korea) Kim Da-bin (South Korea) Lee So-ra | 2–6, 5–7 |
| Win | 7. | 8 September 2019 | ITF Yeongwol, Korea | Hard | (South Korea) Kim Na-ri | (Thailand) Tamachan Momkoonthod (Thailand) Watsachol Sawatdee | 5–7, 7–6, [11–9] |
