= Choi Ji-hee =

South Korean tennis player (born 1995)

Choi Ji-hee 최지희
- Country (sports): South Korea
- Residence: Seoul, South Korea
- Born: 10 February 1995 (age 31) Seoul
- Retired: (last match played in September 2024)
- Plays: Right (two-handed backhand)
- Prize money: $125,531

Singles
- Career record: 199–197
- Career titles: 0 WTA, 3 ITF
- Highest ranking: No. 339 (6 June 2016)

Doubles
- Career record: 255–176
- Career titles: 1 WTA, 1 WTA Challenger
- Highest ranking: No. 111 (15 July 2019)

Team competitions
- Fed Cup: 4–6

- Choi Ji-hee
- Hangul: 최지희
- RR: Choe Jihui
- MR: Ch'oe Chihŭi

Choi Ji-hee (Korean: 최지희; born 10 February 1995) is an inactive South Korean tennis player. Choi has won one doubles title on the WTA Tour and one doubles title om WTA 125 tournaments, as well as three singles and 26 doubles titles on the ITF Women's Circuit.

Playing for South Korea Fed Cup team, Choi has a win–loss record of 4–6.

== Career ==
Partnering Han Na-lae, she won the doubles title at the 2018 Korea Open, defeating Hsieh Shu-ying and Hsieh Su-wei in the final. The pair repeated the feat at the 2021 Korea Open, this time overcoming Valentini Grammatikopoulou and Réka Luca Jani in the championship match.

== WTA Tour finals ==
=== Doubles: 1 (title) ===
Legend WTA 250 (1–0)	Finals by surface Hard (1–0)

Result	Date	Tournament	Tier	Surface	Partner	Opponents	Score
Win	Sep 2018	Korea Open	International (Note: The WTA International tournaments were reclassified as WTA 250 tournaments in 2021.)	Hard	(South Korea) Han Na-lae	(Chinese Taipei) Hsieh Shu-ying (Chinese Taipei) Hsieh Su-wei	6–3, 6–2

== WTA 125 finals ==
=== Doubles: 1 (title) ===
Result	Date	Tournament	Surface	Partner	Opponents	Score
Win	Dec 2021	Korea Open, South Korea	Hard (i)	(South Korea) Han Na-lae	(Greece) Valentini Grammatikopoulou (Hungary) Réka Luca Jani	6–4, 6–4

== ITF Circuit finals ==
=== Singles: 9 (3 titles, 6 runner-ups) ===
Legend $10/15,000 tournaments	Finals by surface Hard (3–6)

Result	W–L	Date	Tournament	Tier	Surface	Opponent	Score
Loss	0–1	Jun 2014	ITF Gimcheon, South Korea	W10	Hard	(South Korea) Lee Ye-ra	2–6, 2–6
Loss	0–2	Jun 2014	ITF Gimcheon, South Korea	W10	Hard	(South Korea) Lee Ye-ra	1–6, 5–7
Win	1–2	Aug 2014	ITF Yeongwol, South Korea	W10	Hard	(China) Zhang Yuxuan	6–3, 6–4
Loss	1–3	Jun 2016	ITF Sangju, South Korea	W10	Hard	(United States) Hanna Chang	2–6, 3–6
Loss	1–4	Jul 2016	ITF Gimcheon, South Korea	W10	Hard	(China) Wang Yan	4–6, 6–7^{(1)}
Loss	1–5	Jun 2017	ITF Sangju, South Korea	W15	Hard	(South Korea) Jeong Su-nam	2–6, 3–6
Loss	1–6	Jun 2017	ITF Gimcheon, South Korea	W15	Hard	(South Korea) Jeong Su-nam	3–6, 6–3, 2–6
Win	2–6	Oct 2017	ITF Nonthaburi, Thailand	W15	Hard	(Switzerland) Lulu Sun	6–2, 6–3
Win	3–6	Sep 2019	ITF Yeongwol, South Korea	W15	Hard	(South Korea) Back Da-yeon	5–7, 6–3, 6–2

=== Doubles: 41 (26 titles, 15 runner-ups) ===
Legend W100 tournaments W25 tournaments W10/15 tournaments	Finals by surface Hard (26–15)

Result	W–L	Date	Tournament	Tier	Surface	Partner	Opponents	Score
Win	1–0	Dec 2012	ITF Jakarta, Indonesia	10k	Hard	(Japan) Akari Inoue	(Japan) Yuka Higuchi (Chinese Taipei) Juan Ting-fei	6–3, 6–4
Win	2–0	Dec 2013	ITF Hong Kong, China SAR	10k	Hard	(Japan) Akari Inoue	(South Korea) Kang Seo-kyung (South Korea) Hong Seung-yeon	4–6, 6–1, [10–7]
Loss	2–1	Mar 2014	ITF Nishitama, Japan	10k	Hard	(Japan) Akari Inoue	(Japan) Junri Namigata (Japan) Akiko Yonemura	2–6, 4–6
Loss	2–2	Jun 2014	ITF Gimcheon, South Korea	10k	Hard	(South Korea) Lee Hye-min	(South Korea) Lee Ye-ra (South Korea) Kim So-jung	3–6, 1–6
Loss	2–3	Jun 2014	ITF Gimcheon, Korea	10k	Hard	(Japan) Makoto Ninomiya	(South Korea) Lee Ye-ra (South Korea) Kim So-jung	5–7, 6–2, [9–11]
Win	3–3	Jun 2014	ITF Gimcheon, Korea	10k	Hard	(Japan) Makoto Ninomiya	(South Korea) Han Na-lae (South Korea) Yoo Mi	6–3, 7–6^{(6)}
Win	4–3	Sep 2014	ITF Yeongwol, South Korea	10k	Hard	(South Korea) Lee So-ra	(China) Liang Chen (China) Liu Chang	6–2, 7–5
Win	5–3	Dec 2014	ITF Hong Kong, China	10k	Hard	(South Korea) Kim Na-ri	(Japan) Nozomi Fujioka (Japan) Mami Hasegawa	6–3, 6–2
Win	6–3	Mar 2015	ITF Jiangmen, China	10k	Hard	(South Korea) Kim Na-ri	(Chinese Taipei) Lee Pei-chi (China) Li Yihong	4–6, 6–2, [11–9]
Loss	6–4	Jun 2015	ITF Incheon, Korea	25k	Hard	(South Korea) Kim Na-ri	(Japan) Miyu Kato (Japan) Kotomi Takahata	6–4, 3–6, [7–10]
Win	7–4	Jun 2015	ITF Gwangju, Korea	10k	Hard	(South Korea) Kim Na-ri	(South Korea) Hong Seung-yeon (South Korea) Kim Ju-eun	6–1, 1–6, [10–5]
Win	8–4	Jul 2015	ITF Hong Kong	15k	Hard	(South Korea) Lee So-ra	(Hong Kong) Eudice Chong (Hong Kong) Katherine Ip	6–2, 6–2
Win	9–4	Jul 2015	ITF Hong Kong	15k	Hard	(South Korea) Lee So-ra	(China) Gai Ao (China) Sheng Yuqi	6–1, 6–1
Win	10–4	Aug 2015	ITF Gimcheon, Korea	10k	Hard	(South Korea) Kim Na-ri	(South Korea) Jung So-hee (South Korea) Park Sang-hee	6–3, 6–2
Win	11–4	Sep 2015	ITF Bangkok, Thailand	15k	Hard	(Thailand) Peangtarn Plipuech	(Chinese Taipei) Hsu Ching-wen (Finland) Emma Laine	7–5, 6–3
Loss	11–5	Dec 2015	ITF Bangkok, Thailand	25k	Hard	(Thailand) Peangtarn Plipuech	(Russia) Irina Khromacheva (Russia) Valeria Solovyeva	3–6, 6–4, [5–10]
Win	12–5	Dec 2016	ITF Navi Mumbai, India	25k	Hard	(South Korea) Kim Na-ri	(Belarus) Sviatlana Pirazhenka (Russia) Anastasia Pribylova	7–5, 6–1
Loss	12–6	May 2017	ITF Changwon, South Korea	25k	Hard	(South Korea) Kim Na-ri	(South Korea) Hong Seung-yeon (South Korea) Kang Seo-kyung	4–6, 3–6
Loss	12–7	May 2017	ITF Incheon, South Korea	25k	Hard	(South Korea) Kim Na-ri	(United States) Desirae Krawczyk (Mexico) Giuliana Olmos	3–6, 6–2, [8–10]
Win	13–7	Jun 2017	ITF Sangju, South Korea	15k	Hard	(South Korea) Kang Seo-kyung	(South Korea) Kim Da-bin (South Korea) Lee So-ra	7–6^{(3)}, 6–3
Win	14–7	Jun 2017	ITF Gimcheon, Korea	15k	Hard	(South Korea) Kang Seo-kyung	(South Korea) Kim Da-bin (South Korea) Lee So-ra	6–4, 6–2
Win	15–7	Aug 2017	ITF Nonthaburi, Thailand	25k	Hard	(Chinese Taipei) Chan Chin-wei	(Thailand) Varatchaya Wongteanchai (Thailand) Varunya Wongteanchai	2–6, 6–1, [13–11]
Loss	15–8	Sep 2017	ITF Yeongwol, Korea	15k	Hard	(South Korea) Kang Seo-kyung	(South Korea) Kim Na-ri (Chinese Taipei) Lee Pei-chi	2–6, 2–6
Win	16–8	Mar 2018	ITF Toyota, Japan	25k	Hard	(South Korea) Kim Na-ri	(Japan) Rika Fujiwara (Hungary) Dalma Gálfi	6–2, 6–3
Win	17–8	Apr 2018	ITF Osaka, Japan	25k	Hard	(Thailand) Nicha Lertpitaksinchai	(Japan) Akiko Omae (Thailand) Peangtarn Plipuech	6–3, 6–4
Loss	17–9	Nov 2018	Shenzhen Longhua Open, China	100k	Hard	(Thailand) Luksika Kumkhum	(Japan) Shuko Aoyama (China) Yang Zhaoxuan	2–6, 3–6
Win	18–9	Mar 2019	Yokohama Challenger, Japan	W25	Hard	(South Korea) Han Na-lae	(India) Rutuja Bhosale (Japan) Akiko Omae	6–1, 7–5
Win	19–9	Apr 2019	ITF Osaka, Japan	W25	Hard	(South Korea) Han Na-lae	(Chinese Taipei) Hsu Ching-wen (China) Wang Xiyu	6–4, 5–7, [10–8]
Loss	19–10	May 2019	ITF Changwon, Korea	W25	Hard	(Chinese Taipei) Lee Ya-hsuan	(Chinese Taipei) Hsu Chieh-yu (South Africa) Chanel Simmonds	3–6, 4–6
Win	20–10	Jun 2019	ITF Incheon, Korea	W25	Hard	(South Korea) Han Na-lae	(Japan) Kanako Morisaki (Japan) Minori Yonehara	6–3, 6–3
Loss	20–11	Jun 2019	ITF Deagu, Korea	W25	Hard	(South Korea) Han Na-lae	(Chinese Taipei) Hsieh Yu-chieh (Chinese Taipei) Lee Pei-chi	3–6, 6–7^{(5)}
Win	21–11	Nov 2019	Tokyo Open, Japan	W100	Hard	(South Korea) Han Na-lae	(Japan) Haruka Kaji (Japan) Junri Namigata	6–3, 6–3
Win	22–11	Sep 2021	ITF Monastir, Tunisia	W15	Hard	(South Korea) Jeong Yeong-won	(Serbia) Elena Milovanović (Bolivia) Noelia Zeballos	6–4, 3–6, [10–5]
Win	23–11	Jun 2022	ITF Changwon, Korea	W25	Hard	(South Korea) Han Na-lae	(Chinese Taipei) Lee Ya-hsuan (Chinese Taipei) Wu Fang-hsien	6–3, 4–6, [15–13]
Win	24–11	Jun 2022	ITF Incheon, Korea	W25	Hard	(South Korea) Han Na-lae	(Chinese Taipei) Lee Ya-hsuan (Chinese Taipei) Wu Fang-hsien	5–7, 6–4, [10–6]
Loss	24–12	Jul 2022	ITF Nur-Sultan, Kazakhstan	W25	Hard	(South Korea) Han Na-lae	(Japan) Momoko Kobori (India) Ankita Raina	2–6, 6–3, [8–10]
Loss	24–13	Sep 2022	ITF Leiria, Portugal	W25	Hard	(Serbia) Natalija Stevanović	(Portugal) Francisca Jorge (Portugal) Matilde Jorge	4–6, 0–6
Loss	24–14	Apr 2023	ITF Jakarta, Indonesia	W25	Hard	(South Korea) Park So-hyun	(China) Guo Hanyu (Hong Kong) Cody Wong	2–6, 6–7^{(6)}
Loss	24–15	Apr 2023	ITF Osaka, Japan	W15	Hard	(Chinese Taipei) Lee Ya-hsuan	(Japan) Aoi Ito (Japan) Mio Mushika	4–6, 7–6^{(6)}, [6–10]
Win	25–15	May 2023	ITF Incheon, South Korea	W25	Hard	(South Korea) Ku Yeon-woo	(Chinese Taipei) Li Yu-yun (China) Tang Qianhui	6–1, 6–1
Win	26–15	Jul 2024	ITF Sapporo, Japan	W15	Hard	(Japan) Shiho Akita	(Japan) Ayumi Miyamoto (Japan) Anri Nagata	7–6^{(5)}, 6–7^{(5)}, [10–8]
