= Han Sung-hee =

South Korean tennis player

Han Sung-hee 한성희
- Country (sports): South Korea
- Residence: South Korea
- Born: 13 November 1990 (age 35) Seoul
- Plays: Right (two-handed backhand)
- Prize money: $90,409

Singles
- Career record: 210–185
- Career titles: 1 ITF
- Highest ranking: No. 256 (16 July 2012)

Doubles
- Career record: 124–134
- Career titles: 7 ITF
- Highest ranking: No. 268 (16 April 2012)

Team competitions
- Fed Cup: 3–5

Coaching awards and records

Korean name
- Hangul: 한성희
- RR: Han Seonghui
- MR: Han Sŏnghŭi

Han Sung-hee (Korean: 한성희; born 13 November 1990) is a South Korean former tennis player.

On 16 July 2012, she reached her highest WTA singles ranking of 256. On 16 April 2012, she peaked at No. 268 in the doubles rankings. She participated in the 2013 KDB Korea Open, losing in the first round to Alexandra Dulgheru.

== ITF Circuit finals ==
Legend
$25,000 tournaments
$15,000 tournaments
$10,000 tournaments

=== Singles: 6 (1 title, 5 runner-ups) ===
Result	No.	Date	Tournament	Surface	Opponent	Score
Loss	1.	16 June 2008	ITF Gurgaon, India	Hard	(India) Sanaa Bhambri	5–7, 1–6
Loss	2.	16 November 2009	ITF Manila, Philippines	Hard	(China) Liu Shaozhuo	1–6, 2–6
Loss	3.	1 November 2011	ITF Mount Gambier, Australia	Hard	(Australia) Bojana Bobusic	3–6, 2–6
Win	1.	24 August 2015	ITF Gimcheon, South Korea	Hard	(Japan) Kanami Tsuji	5–7, 7–5, 4–1 ret.
Loss	4.	31 August 2015	ITF Yeongwol, South Korea	Hard	(China) You Xiaodi	1–6, 3–6
Loss	5.	18 June 2017	ITF Gimcheon, South Korea	Hard	(South Korea) Jeong Su-nam	3–6, 1–6

=== Doubles: 18 (7 titles, 11 runner-ups) ===
Result	No.	Date	Tournament	Surface	Partner	Opponents	Score
Win	1.	13 June 2008	ITF Gurgaon, India	Hard	(India) Parija Maloo	(Australia) Julia Moriarty (Australia) Cassandra Chan	6–3, 6–4
Loss	1.	2 November 2009	ITF Kuching, Malaysia	Hard	(South Korea) Kang Seo-kyung	(Indonesia) Lavinia Tananta (Indonesia) Romana Tedjakusuma	2–6, 5–7
Loss	2.	21 February 2011	ITF Navi Mumbai, India	Hard	(Thailand) Varatchaya Wongteanchai	(Japan) Kanae Hisami (China) Li Ting	1–6, 5–7
Win	2.	11 April 2011	ITF Incheon, South Korea	Hard	(South Korea) Hong Hyun-hui	(Chinese Taipei) Kao Shao-yuan (Thailand) Varatchaya Wongteanchai	6–3, 7–6^{(3)}
Win	3.	2 May 2011	ITF Bukhara, Uzbekistan	Hard	(China) Liang Chen	(Russia) Nina Bratchikova (Kyrgyzstan) Ksenia Palkina	4–6, 7–6^{(5)}, 6–4
Loss	3.	27 February 2012	ITF Wellington, New Zealand	Hard	(Japan) Yurina Koshino	(United Kingdom) Anna Fitzpatrick (South Africa) Chanel Simmonds	3–6, 4–6
Loss	4.	27 May 2013	ITF Changwon, South Korea	Hard	(South Korea) Kim Ju-eun	(Chinese Taipei) Chan Chin-wei (China) Liu Chang	0–6, 2–6
Loss	5.	27 June 2014	ITF New Delhi, India	Hard	(India) Nidhi Chilumula	(India) Rutuja Bhosale (South Korea) Kim Da-bin	2–6, 6–7^{(2)}
Loss	6.	19 October 2014	ITF Goyang, South Korea	Hard	(South Korea) Lee Hye-min	(South Korea) Lee So-ra (South Korea) Hong Hyun-hui	4–6, 2–6
Loss	7.	10 August 2015	ITF Gimcheon, South Korea	Hard	(Japan) Makoto Ninomiya	(China) Cao Siqi (China) Xun Fangying	6–7^{(2)}, 4–6
Loss	8.	24 August 2015	ITF Gimcheon, South Korea	Hard	(South Korea) Kim Na-ri	(South Korea) Hong Seung-yeon (South Korea) Kim So-jung	4–6, 7–6^{(1)}, [8–10]
Win	4.	31 August 2015	ITF Yeongwol, South Korea	Hard	(South Korea) Hong Seung-yeon	(China) You Xiaodi (China) Zhang Yukun	7–5, 3–6, [10–7]
Win	5.	13 December 2015	ITF Hong Kong	Hard	(South Korea) Kim Na-ri	(Finland) Emma Laine (Japan) Yukina Saigo	3–6, 6–3, [10–8]
Win	6.	28 May 2016	ITF Incheon, South Korea	Hard	(Japan) Makoto Ninomiya	(Thailand) Kamonwan Buayam (Chinese Taipei) Lee Pei-chi	6–3, 6–1
Loss	9.	20 June 2016	ITF Sangju, South Korea	Hard	(China) Wang Yan	(South Korea) Kim Ju-eun (China) Ye Qiuyu	5–7, 7–6^{(6)}, [6–10]
Loss	10.	29 April 2017	ITF Hua Hin, Thailand	Hard	(Thailand) Patcharin Cheapchandej	(Thailand) Nudnida Luangnam (Thailand) Varunya Wongteanchai	5–7, 2–6
Win	7.	9 June 2017	ITF Gimcheon, South Korea	Hard	(South Korea) Hong Seung-yeon	(South Korea) Kim Da-bin (South Korea) Lee So-ra	3–6, 6–4, [10–5]
Loss	11.	17 July 2017	ITF Hua Hin, Thailand	Hard	(Thailand) Patcharin Cheapchandej	(Thailand) Nudnida Luangnam (Thailand) Varunya Wongteanchai	2–6, 6–7^{(5)}
