= 2012 Samsung Securities Cup – Women's singles =

$25,000 ITF Women's Circuit tennis singles tournament

Women's singles
- 2012 Samsung Securities Cup

Final
- Champion: (Japan) Erika Sema
- Runner-up: (Japan) Mai Minokoshi
- Score: 6–1, 7–5

Events
Singles	men	women
Doubles	men	women
← 2011 ·	Samsung Securities Cup	· 2013 →

Hsieh Su-wei was the defending champion but decided not to participate.

Erika Sema won the tournament, defeating Mai Minokoshi in the final, 6–1, 7–5.

== Seeds ==
1. (Croatia) Donna Vekić (quarterfinals)
2. (Japan) Erika Sema (champion)
3. (South Korea) Han Sung-hee (quarterfinals)
4. (Hong Kong) Venise Chan (quarterfinals)
5. (Japan) Mai Minokoshi (final)
6. (Uzbekistan) Nigina Abduraimova (first round)
7. (Japan) Chiaki Okadaue (first round)
8. (South Korea) Lee So-ra (first round)

== Draw ==
=== Key ===
- Q = Qualifier
- WC = Wild card
- LL = Lucky loser
- Alt = Alternate
- SE = Special exempt
- PR = Protected ranking
- ITF = ITF entry
- JE = Junior exempt
- w/o = Walkover
- r = Retired
- d = Defaulted
- SR = Special ranking

=== Finals ===
Semifinals
(China) Zhang Yuxuan	5	6	3
5	(Japan) Mai Minokoshi	7	1	6
Q	(South Korea) Kim Na-ri	0	6^{3}
2	(Japan) Erika Sema	6	7^{7}

Final
5	(Japan) Mai Minokoshi	1	5
2	(Japan) Erika Sema	6	7

=== Top half ===
First round
1	(Croatia) D Vekić	6	6
(South Korea) H-h Hong	1	2
Q	(Vietnam) TPĐ Huỳnh	1	6	4
(Japan) M Inoue	6	1	6
(Thailand) N Wannasuk	6^{5}	3
WC	(South Korea) N-l Han	7^{7}	6
(China) Y Zhang	6	6
7	(Japan) C Okadaue	3	0
4	(Hong Kong) V Chan	7	5	6
Q	(Thailand) Varu Wongteanchai	5	7	4
(South Korea) Y-r Lee	3	4
(South Korea) J-y Kim	6	6
Q	(South Korea) J-h Choi	3	6	6
(South Korea) S-j Kim	6	3	4
Q	(South Korea) Y-r Lee	1	0
5	(Japan) M Minokoshi	6	6

Second round
1	(Croatia) D Vekić	6	6
(Japan) M Inoue	2	2
WC	(South Korea) N-l Han	5	1
(China) Y Zhang	7	6
4	(Hong Kong) V Chan	6	3	6
(South Korea) J-y Kim	4	6	4
Q	(South Korea) J-h Choi	6	2	3
5	(Japan) M Minokoshi	3	6	6

Quarterfinals
1	(Croatia) D Vekić	6	5	3
(China) Y Zhang	0	7	6
4	(Hong Kong) V Chan	4	0
5	(Japan) M Minokoshi	6	6

Semifinals
(China) Y Zhang	5	6	3
5	(Japan) M Minokoshi	7	1	6

=== Bottom half ===
First round
8	(South Korea) S-r Lee	6^{4}	6^{4}
Q	(South Korea) N-r Kim	7^{7}	7^{7}
(Japan) Y Miyazaki	4	6	6
Q	(Thailand) N Sankaew	6	1	2
Q	(South Korea) H-s Kim	2	6	6
(South Korea) S-j Jang	6	4	3
(South Korea) M-h Yu	5	1
3	(South Korea) S-h Han	7	6
6	(Uzbekistan) N Abduraimova	4	0
(South Korea) J-e Kim	6	6
Q	(South Korea) H-j Yea	1	1
WC	(South Korea) S-k Kang	6	6
WC	(South Korea) J-a Lee	6	3	6
(South Korea) M Yoo	1	6	4
WC	(South Korea) A Song	1	0
2	(Japan) E Sema	6	6

Second round
Q	(South Korea) N-r Kim	1	6	6
(Japan) Y Miyazaki	6	3	3
Q	(South Korea) H-s Kim	4	2
3	(South Korea) S-h Han	6	6
(South Korea) J-e Kim	3	4
WC	(South Korea) S-k Kang	6	6
WC	(South Korea) J-a Lee	5	1
2	(Japan) E Sema	7	6

Quarterfinals
Q	(South Korea) N-r Kim	6	6
3	(South Korea) S-h Han	3	4
WC	(South Korea) S-k Kang	4	5
2	(Japan) E Sema	6	7

Semifinals
Q	(South Korea) N-r Kim	0	6^{3}
2	(Japan) E Sema	6	7^{7}
