= 2012 Samsung Securities Cup – Women's doubles =

Women's doubles
- 2012 Samsung Securities Cup

Final
- Champions: (Uzbekistan) Nigina Abduraimova (Hong Kong) Venise Chan
- Runners-up: (South Korea) Kim Ji-young (South Korea) Yoo Mi
- Score: 6–4, 2–6, [12–10]

Events
Singles	men	women
Doubles	men	women
← 2011 ·	Samsung Securities Cup	· 2013 →

Kang Seo-kyung and Kim Na-ri were the defending champions but decided not to participate together. Kang played alongside Yu Min-hwa, while Kim partnered up with Han Sung-hee. Both pairs lost in the quarterfinals.

Nigina Abduraimova and Venise Chan won the tournament, defeating Kim Ji-young and Yoo Mi in the final, 6–4, 2–6, [12–10].

== Seeds ==
1. (South Korea) Kim Ji-young / (South Korea) Yoo Mi (final)
2. (Thailand) Nungnadda Wannasuk / (Thailand) Varunya Wongteanchai (first round)
3. (South Korea) Han Sung-hee / (South Korea) Kim Na-ri (quarterfinals)
4. (South Korea) Kim Hae-sung / (South Korea) Kim Ju-eun (first round)

== Draw ==
=== Key ===
- Q = Qualifier
- WC = Wild card
- LL = Lucky loser
- Alt = Alternate
- ITF = ITF entry
- PR = Protected ranking
- SR = Special ranking
- SE = Special exempt
- JE = Junior exempt
- JR = Junior Accelerator Programme entrant
- CO = College Accelerator Programme entrant
- NG = Next Gen Accelerator Program entrant
- w/o = Walkover
- r = Retired
- d = Defaulted

First round
1	(South Korea) J-y Kim (South Korea) M Yoo	6	6
(United Kingdom) R Beddow (South Korea) J-h Choi	1	2
(South Korea) S-k Kang (South Korea) M-h Yu	6	6
(South Korea) N-l Han (South Korea) S-j Jang	4	4
4	(South Korea) H-s Kim (South Korea) J-e Kim	6	3	[6]
(Japan) M Inoue (Japan) M Minokoshi	3	6	[10]
(South Korea) H-h Hong (South Korea) Y-r Lee	1	7	[8]
(South Korea) S-j Kim (South Korea) S-r Lee	6	5	[10]
(Uzbekistan) N Abduraimova (Hong Kong) V Chan	7	6
(South Korea) N-y Jun (South Korea) S-h Park	5	1
(South Korea) Y-y Jeong (South Korea) H-j Yea	2	1
3	(South Korea) S-h Han (South Korea) N-r Kim	6	6
(South Korea) M-r Ham (Vietnam) TPĐ Huỳnh	3	6	[4]
(South Korea) J-h Lee (South Korea) S-a Park	6	4	[10]
(Japan) Y Miyazaki (Thailand) N Sankaew	0	6	[12]
2	(Thailand) N Wannasuk (Thailand) Varu Wongteanchai	6	2	[10]

Quarterfinals
1	(South Korea) J-y Kim (South Korea) M Yoo	7^{9}	6
(South Korea) S-k Kang (South Korea) M-h Yu	6^{7}	2
(Japan) M Inoue (Japan) M Minokoshi	1	2
(South Korea) S-j Kim (South Korea) S-r Lee	6	6
(Uzbekistan) N Abduraimova (Hong Kong) V Chan	6	6
3	(South Korea) S-h Han (South Korea) N-r Kim	4	4
(South Korea) J-h Lee (South Korea) S-a Park	3	7^{7}	[11]
(Japan) Y Miyazaki (Thailand) N Sankaew	6	6^{5}	[13]

Semifinals
1	(South Korea) J-y Kim (South Korea) M Yoo	6	6
(South Korea) S-j Kim (South Korea) S-r Lee	2	4
(Uzbekistan) N Abduraimova (Hong Kong) V Chan	6	6
(Japan) Y Miyazaki (Thailand) N Sankaew	4	3

Final
1	(South Korea) J-y Kim (South Korea) M Yoo	4	6	[10]
(Uzbekistan) N Abduraimova (Hong Kong) V Chan	6	2	[12]
