= 2011 Samsung Securities Cup – Women's doubles =

Women's doubles
- 2011 Samsung Securities Cup

Final
- Champions: (South Korea) Kang Seo-kyung (South Korea) Kim Na-ri
- Runners-up: (South Korea) Kim Ji-young (South Korea) Yoo Mi
- Score: 5–7, 6–1, [10–7]

Events
Singles	men	women
Doubles	men	women
← 2010 ·	Samsung Securities Cup	· 2012 →

This was a new event on the ITF Women's Circuit in 2011.

Kang Seo-kyung and Kim Na-ri won the tournament, defeating Kim Ji-young and Yoo Mi in the final, 5–7, 6–1, [10–7].

== Seeds ==
1. (Chinese Taipei) Hsieh Shu-ying / (Chinese Taipei) Hsieh Su-wei (quarterfinals)
2. (South Korea) Kim So-jung / (Japan) Remi Tezuka (quarterfinals)
3. (South Korea) Han Sung-hee / (Thailand) Nicha Lertpitaksinchai (semifinals)
4. (Japan) Chiaki Okadaue / (Japan) Erika Takao (semifinals)

== Draw ==
=== Key ===
- Q = Qualifier
- WC = Wild card
- LL = Lucky loser
- Alt = Alternate
- SE = Special exempt
- PR = Protected ranking
- ITF = ITF entry
- JE = Junior exempt
- w/o = Walkover
- r = Retired
- d = Defaulted
- SR = Special ranking

First round
1	(Chinese Taipei) S-y Hsieh (Chinese Taipei) S-w Hsieh	6	6
(Japan) Y Miyazaki (Japan) Y Sema	3	3
(Chinese Taipei) Y Chen (Uzbekistan) S Sharipova	6	5	[8]
(South Korea) S-k Kang (South Korea) N-r Kim	4	7	[10]
3	(South Korea) S-h Han (Thailand) N Lertpitaksinchai	6	7^{7}
(South Korea) H-s Kim (South Korea) J-e Kim	2	6^{3}
(Chinese Taipei) T-f Juan (Chinese Taipei) P-c Lee	2	0
(South Korea) M-r Ham (South Korea) Su-j Kim	6	6
WC	(China) X Cai (South Korea) N-y Jun	3	0
WC	(South Korea) N-l Han (South Korea) S-r Lee	6	6
(South Korea) H-h Hong (South Korea) Y-r Lee	2	2
4	(Japan) C Okadaue (Japan) E Takao	6	6
WC	(South Korea) S-y Hong (South Korea) S-j Jang	0	2
(South Korea) J-y Kim (South Korea) M Yoo	6	6
(Japan) M Minokoshi (Japan) Y Nakano	0	2
2	(South Korea) So-j Kim (Japan) R Tezuka	6	6

Quarterfinals
1	(Chinese Taipei) S-y Hsieh (Chinese Taipei) S-w Hsieh	3	6	[4]
(South Korea) S-k Kang (South Korea) N-r Kim	6	2	[10]
3	(South Korea) S-h Han (Thailand) N Lertpitaksinchai	6	6
(South Korea) M-r Ham (South Korea) Su-j Kim	1	3
WC	(South Korea) N-l Han (South Korea) S-r Lee	3	0
4	(Japan) C Okadaue (Japan) E Takao	6	6
(South Korea) J-y Kim (South Korea) M Yoo	6	6^{5}	[10]
2	(South Korea) So-j Kim (Japan) R Tezuka	1	7^{7}	[4]

Semifinals
(South Korea) S-k Kang (South Korea) N-r Kim	7^{7}	3	[10]
3	(South Korea) S-h Han (Thailand) N Lertpitaksinchai	6^{1}	6	[3]
4	(Japan) C Okadaue (Japan) E Takao	4	5
(South Korea) J-y Kim (South Korea) M Yoo	6	7

Finals
(South Korea) S-k Kang (South Korea) N-r Kim	5	6	[10]
(South Korea) J-y Kim (South Korea) M Yoo	7	1	[7]
