= 2012 Samsung Securities Cup =

- Date: 22–28 October
- Edition: 13th
- Surface: Hard
- Location: Seoul, Korea

Champions

Men's singles
- (Chinese Taipei) Lu Yen-hsun

Women's singles
- (Japan) Erika Sema

Men's doubles
- (Chinese Taipei) Lee Hsin-han / (Chinese Taipei) Peng Hsien-yin

Women's doubles
- (Uzbekistan) Nigina Abduraimova / (Hong Kong) Chan Wing-yau
← 2011 ·	Samsung Securities Cup	· 2013 →

The 2012 Samsung Securities Cup was a professional tennis tournament played on hard courts. It was the 13th edition of the tournament which was part of the 2012 ATP Challenger Tour and the 2012 ITF Women's Circuit. It took place in Seoul, Korea between 22 and 28 October 2012.

== ATP main-draw entrants ==
=== Seeds ===
Country	Player	Rank^{1}	Seed
TPE	Lu Yen-hsun	58	1
JPN	Tatsuma Ito	63	2
RUS	Dmitry Tursunov	105	3
TUN	Malek Jaziri	112	4
FRA	Kenny de Schepper	123	5
JPN	Yūichi Sugita	141	6
TPE	Jimmy Wang	146	7
BLR	Uladzimir Ignatik	149	8

- ^{1} Rankings are as of October 15, 2012.

=== Other entrants ===
The following players received wildcards into the singles main draw:

- (South Korea) Chung Hy-Eon
- (South Korea) Jeong Suk-Young
- (South Korea) Nam Ji-Sung
- (South Korea) Nam Hyun-woo

The following players received entry from the qualifying draw:

- (South Korea) Lim Yong-Kyu
- (Netherlands) Matwé Middelkoop
- (South Korea) Na Jung-Woong
- (India) Divij Sharan

== WTA main-draw entrants ==
=== Seeds ===
Country	Player	Rank^{1}	Seed
CRO	Donna Vekić	108	1
JPN	Erika Sema	183	2
KOR	Han Sung-Hee	273	3
HKG	Chan Wing-yau	340	4
JPN	Mai Minokoshi	343	5
UZB	Nigina Abduraimova	344	6
JPN	Chiaki Okadaue	369	7
KOR	Lee So-Ra	392	8

- ^{1} Rankings are as of October 15, 2012.

=== Other entrants ===
The following players received wildcards into the singles main draw:

- (South Korea) Han Na-Lae
- (South Korea) Kang Seo-Kyung
- (South Korea) Lee Jin-a
- (South Korea) Song Ah

The following players received entry from the qualifying draw:

- (South Korea) Choi Ji-Hee
- (South Korea) Kim Hae-Sung
- (South Korea) Kim Na-Ri
- (South Korea) Lee Ye-Rin
- (Thailand) Napatsakorn Sankaew
- (Vietnam) Trang Huynh Phuong Dai
- (Thailand) Varunya Wongteanchai
- (South Korea) Yea Hyo-Jung

== Champions ==
=== Men's singles ===
- (Chinese Taipei) Lu Yen-hsun def. (Japan) Yūichi Sugita, 6–3, 7–6^{(7–4)}

=== Women's singles ===
- (Japan) Erika Sema def. (Japan) Mai Minokoshi, 6–1, 7–5

=== Men's doubles ===
- (Chinese Taipei) Lee Hsin-han / (Chinese Taipei) Peng Hsien-yin def. (South Korea) Lim Yong-Kyu / (South Korea) Nam Ji-Sung, 7–6^{(7–3)}, 7–5

=== Women's doubles ===
- (Uzbekistan) Nigina Abduraimova / (Hong Kong) Chan Wing-yau def. (South Korea) Kim Ji-Young / (South Korea) Yoo Mi, 6–4, 2–6, [12–10]
