= 2011 Samsung Securities Cup – Women's singles =

Women's singles
- 2011 Samsung Securities Cup

Final
- Champion: (Chinese Taipei) Hsieh Su-wei
- Runner-up: (Japan) Yurika Sema
- Score: 6–1, 6–0

Events
Singles	men	women
Doubles	men	women
← 2010 ·	Samsung Securities Cup	· 2012 →

This was a new event on the ITF Women's Circuit in 2011.

Hsieh Su-wei won the tournament, defeating Yurika Sema in the final, 6–1, 6–0.

== Seeds ==
1. (Japan) Yurika Sema (final)
2. (Chinese Taipei) Hsieh Su-wei (champion)
3. (Japan) Aiko Nakamura (semifinals)
4. (Japan) Erika Takao (first round)
5. (Thailand) Nicha Lertpitaksinchai (first round)
6. (South Korea) Kim So-jung (quarterfinals)
7. (China) Hu Yueyue (quarterfinals)
8. (South Korea) Han Sung-hee (quarterfinals)

== Main draw ==
=== Key ===
- Q = Qualifier
- WC = Wild card
- LL = Lucky loser
- Alt = Alternate
- SE = Special exempt
- PR = Protected ranking
- ITF = ITF entry
- JE = Junior exempt
- w/o = Walkover
- r = Retired
- d = Defaulted
- SR = Special ranking

=== Finals ===
Semifinals
1	(Japan) Yurika Sema	4	6	7^{7}
3	(Japan) Aiko Nakamura	6	2	6^{2}
(South Korea) Yoo Mi	0	2
2	(Chinese Taipei) Hsieh Su-wei	6	6

Final
1	(Japan) Yurika Sema	1	0
2	(Chinese Taipei) Hsieh Su-wei	6	6

=== Top half ===
First round
1	(Japan) Y Sema	1	6	6
Q	(China) Y Zhang	6	4	0
Q	(South Korea) H Yea	2	4
WC	(South Korea) S-r Lee	6	6
(Chinese Taipei) T-f Juan	6	7
Q	(South Korea) J-e Kim	2	5
WC	(South Korea) H-r Ham	1	2
6	(South Korea) S-j Kim	6	6
3	(Japan) A Nakamura	6	7^{9}
Q	(China) Y Yuan	1	6^{7}
Q	(Japan) M Minokoshi	7^{7}	6
(South Korea) S-y Hong	6^{3}	1
(South Korea) S-j Jang	7^{8}	6
Q	(South Korea) S-k Kang	6^{6}	2
Q	(South Korea) J-y Kim	7^{7}	1	7^{7}
5	(Thailand) N Lertpitaksinchai	6^{3}	6	6^{3}

Second round
1	(Japan) Y Sema	6	1	7^{7}
WC	(South Korea) S-r Lee	2	6	6^{1}
(Chinese Taipei) T-f Juan	7^{7}	1	3
6	(South Korea) S-j Kim	6^{5}	6	6
3	(Japan) A Nakamura	6	6
Q	(Japan) M Minokoshi	0	4
(South Korea) S-j Jang	4	4
Q	(South Korea) J-y Kim	6	6

Quarterfinals
1	(Japan) Y Sema	6	6
6	(South Korea) S-j Kim	4	4
3	(Japan) A Nakamura	6	6
Q	(South Korea) J-y Kim	3	3

Semifinals
1	(Japan) Y Sema	4	6	7^{7}
3	(Japan) A Nakamura	6	2	6^{2}

=== Bottom half ===
First round
7	(China) Y Hu	7	6
(Japan) Y Nakano	5	1
(Japan) R Tezuka	1	1
(Uzbekistan) S Sharipova	6	6
WC	(South Korea) J-h Choi	4	2
(Japan) Y Miyazaki	6	6
(South Korea) M Yoo	6	6
4	(Japan) E Takao	1	2
8	(South Korea) S-h Han	6	4	6
(South Korea) H-s Kim	2	6	2
Q	(Chinese Taipei) Y Chen	7^{7}	6
(South Korea) H-h Hong	6^{3}	4
(South Korea) N-l Han	4	4
(Japan) C Okadaue	6	6
WC	(South Korea) S-j Lee	7^{8}	2	1
2	(Chinese Taipei) S-w Hsieh	6^{6}	6	6

Second round
7	(China) Y Hu	6	6
(Uzbekistan) S Sharipova	3	3
(Japan) Y Miyazaki	0	2
(South Korea) M Yoo	6	6
8	(South Korea) S-h Han	6	6
Q	(Chinese Taipei) Y Chen	3	4
(Japan) C Okadaue	2	1
2	(Chinese Taipei) S-w Hsieh	6	6

Quarterfinals
7	(China) Y Hu	1	1
(South Korea) M Yoo	6	6
8	(South Korea) S-h Han	2	4
2	(Chinese Taipei) S-w Hsieh	6	6

Semifinals
(South Korea) M Yoo	0	2
2	(Chinese Taipei) S-w Hsieh	6	6
