= 2013 Samsung Securities Cup – Women's doubles =

Women's doubles
- 2013 Samsung Securities Cup

Final
- Champions: (South Korea) Han Na-lae (South Korea) Yoo Mi
- Runners-up: (South Korea) Kim Sun-jung (South Korea) Yu Min-hwa
- Score: 2–6, 6–3, [10–6]

Events
Singles	men	women
Doubles	men	women
← 2012 ·	Samsung Securities Cup	· 2014 →

Nigina Abduraimova and Venise Chan were the defending champions, having won the event in 2012, but both decided not to compete in 2013.

Han Na-lae and Yoo Mi won the tournament, defeating Kim Sun-jung and Yu Min-hwa in the all-Korean final, 2–6, 6–3, [10–6].

== Seeds ==
1. (Japan) Miki Miyamura / (Japan) Akiko Omae (semifinals)
2. (Japan) Nao Hibino / (Japan) Miyu Kato (quarterfinals)
3. (South Korea) Jang Su-jeong / (South Korea) Lee So-ra (quarterfinals)
4. (China) Lu Jiajing / (China) Lu Jiaxiang (quarterfinals)

== Draw ==
=== Key ===
- Q = Qualifier
- WC = Wild card
- LL = Lucky loser
- Alt = Alternate
- SE = Special exempt
- PR = Protected ranking
- ITF = ITF entry
- JE = Junior exempt
- w/o = Walkover
- r = Retired
- d = Defaulted
- SR = Special ranking

First round
1	(Japan) M Miyamura (Japan) A Omae	6	6
(South Korea) M-r Ham (South Korea) H-h Hong	3	3
(South Korea) N-y Jun (South Korea) D-h Kim	2	4
(South Korea) J-h Choi (South Korea) S-h Han	6	6
4	(China) Jiaj Lu (China) Jiax Lu	6	6
(South Korea) S-k Kang (South Korea) J-y Kim	2	2
(South Korea) S-h Jung (South Korea) S-j Lee	1	3
(South Korea) N-l Han (South Korea) M Yoo	6	6
(South Korea) S-j Kim (South Korea) Y-r Lee	6	6
(South Korea) S-y Hong (South Korea) H-m Lee	2	2
(South Korea) A Song (South Korea) J Yoo	4	4
3	(South Korea) S-j Jang (South Korea) S-r Lee	6	6
(South Korea) S-j Kim (South Korea) M-h Yu	6	6
(Israel) D Khazaniuk (Russia) Y Sizikova	4	2
(South Korea) J-h Lee (South Korea) S-a Park	2	2
2	(Japan) N Hibino (Japan) M Kato	6	6

Quarterfinals
1	(Japan) M Miyamura (Japan) A Omae	6	6
(South Korea) J-h Choi (South Korea) S-h Han	3	2
4	(China) Jiaj Lu (China) Jiax Lu	6	3	[7]
(South Korea) N-l Han (South Korea) M Yoo	4	6	[10]
(South Korea) S-j Kim (South Korea) Y-r Lee	6	6^{3}	[10]
3	(South Korea) S-j Jang (South Korea) S-r Lee	4	7^{7}	[2]
(South Korea) S-j Kim (South Korea) M-h Yu	6	3	[10]
2	(Japan) N Hibino (Japan) M Kato	3	6	[7]

Semifinals
1	(Japan) M Miyamura (Japan) A Omae	6^{2}	2
(South Korea) N-l Han (South Korea) M Yoo	7^{7}	6
(South Korea) S-j Kim (South Korea) Y-r Lee
(South Korea) S-j Kim (South Korea) M-h Yu	w/o

Final
(South Korea) N-l Han (South Korea) M Yoo	2	6	[10]
(South Korea) S-j Kim (South Korea) M-h Yu	6	3	[6]
