= 2011 Samsung Securities Cup =

- Date: 17–23 October
- Edition: 12th (men); 1st (women)
- Surface: Hard
- Location: Seoul, South Korea

Champions

Men's singles
- (Chinese Taipei) Lu Yen-hsun

Women's singles
- (Chinese Taipei) Hsieh Su-wei

Men's doubles
- (Thailand) Sanchai Ratiwatana / (Thailand) Sonchat Ratiwatana

Women's doubles
- (South Korea) Kang Seo-kyung / (South Korea) Kim Na-ri
← 2010 ·	Samsung Securities Cup	· 2012 →

The 2011 Samsung Securities Cup was a professional tennis tournament played on hard courts. It was the 12th edition and the 1st edition of the tournament which was part of the 2011 ATP Challenger Tour and the 2011 ITF Women's Circuit. It took place in Seoul, South Korea between 17 and 23 October 2011.

== ATP entrants ==
=== Seeds ===
Country	Player	Rank^{1}	Seed
TPE	Lu Yen-hsun	74	1
SVN	Grega Žemlja	115	2
JPN	Go Soeda	116	3
JPN	Tatsuma Ito	121	4
RSA	Rik de Voest	129	5
FRA	Florent Serra	141	6
BLR	Uladzimir Ignatik	167	7
POL	Michał Przysiężny	170	8

- ^{1} Rankings are as of October 10, 2011.

=== Other entrants ===
The following players received wildcards into the singles main draw:

- (South Korea) Cho Soong-jae
- (South Korea) Chung Hong
- (South Korea) Nam Ji-sung
- (South Korea) Song Min-kyu

The following players received entry from the qualifying draw:

- (South Korea) Jeong Suk-young
- (United States) David Martin
- (Japan) Toshihide Matsui
- (South Korea) Na Jung-woong

== WTA entrants ==
=== Seeds ===
Country	Player	Rank^{1}	Seed
JPN	Yurika Sema	180	1
TPE	Hsieh Su-wei	192	2
JPN	Aiko Nakamura	221	3
JPN	Erika Takao	282	4
THA	Nicha Lertpitaksinchai	309	5
KOR	Kim So-jung	310	6
CHN	Hu Yueyue	337	7
KOR	Han Sung-hee	425	8

- ^{1} Rankings are as of October 10, 2011.

=== Other entrants ===
The following players received wildcards into the singles main draw:

- (South Korea) Choi Ji-hee
- (South Korea) Ham Mi-rae
- (South Korea) Lee Se-jin
- (South Korea) Lee So-ra

The following players received entry from the qualifying draw:

- (Chinese Taipei) Chen Yi
- (South Korea) Kang Seo-kyung
- (South Korea) Kim Ji-young
- (South Korea) Kim Ju-eun
- (Japan) Mai Minokoshi
- (South Korea) Yea Hyojung
- (China) Yuan Yue
- (China) Zhang Yuxuan

== Champions ==
=== Men's singles ===
(Chinese Taipei) Lu Yen-hsun def. (Chinese Taipei) Jimmy Wang, 7–5, 6–3

=== Women's singles ===
(Chinese Taipei) Hsieh Su-wei def. (Japan) Yurika Sema, 6–1, 6–0

=== Men's doubles ===
(Thailand) Sanchai Ratiwatana / (Thailand) Sonchat Ratiwatana def. (India) Purav Raja / (India) Divij Sharan, 6–4, 7–6^{(7–3)}

=== Women's doubles ===
(South Korea) Kang Seo-kyung / (South Korea) Kim Na-ri def. (South Korea) Kim Ji-young / (South Korea) Yoo Mi, 5–7, 6–1, [10–7]
