= 2011 Samsung Securities Cup – Men's doubles =

Men's doubles
- 2011 Samsung Securities Cup

Final
- Champions: (Thailand) Sanchai Ratiwatana (Thailand) Sonchat Ratiwatana
- Runners-up: (India) Purav Raja (India) Divij Sharan
- Score: 6–4, 7–6^{(7–3)}

Events
Singles	men	women
Doubles	men	women
← 2010 ·	Samsung Securities Cup	· 2012 →

Rameez Junaid and Frank Moser were the defending champions, but decided not to participate.

Sanchai Ratiwatana and Sonchat Ratiwatana won the final by defeating Purav Raja and Divij Sharan 6–4, 7–6^{(7–3)}.

== Seeds ==
1. (Australia) Jordan Kerr / (United States) David Martin (semifinals)
2. (United States) John Paul Fruttero / (South Africa) Raven Klaasen (semifinals)
3. (Thailand) Sanchai Ratiwatana / (Thailand) Sonchat Ratiwatana (champions)
4. (India) Purav Raja / (India) Divij Sharan (final)

== Draw ==
=== Key ===
- Q = Qualifier
- WC = Wild card
- LL = Lucky loser
- Alt = Alternate
- SE = Special exempt
- PR = Protected ranking
- ITF = ITF entry
- JE = Junior exempt
- w/o = Walkover
- r = Retired
- d = Defaulted
- SR = Special ranking

=== Draw ===
First round
1	(Australia) J Kerr (United States) D Martin	6	3	[10]
(Belarus) U Ignatik (Poland) M Przysiężny	4	6	[6]
(Chinese Taipei) T Chen (Thailand) K Wachiramanowong	0	5
(South Africa) R de Voest (Bosnia and Herzegovina) A Delić	6	7
4	(India) P Raja (India) D Sharan	6	6
WC	(South Korea) S-j Cho (South Korea) J-m Seol	1	2
(Canada) P-L Duclos (Italy) R Ghedin	6	6
(Thailand) W Doakmaiklee (Thailand) D Udomchoke	3	4
(Chinese Taipei) J Wang (Slovenia) G Žemlja	6^{7}	2	r
(Moldova) R Borvanov (Japan) Y Sugita	7^{7}	4
WC	(South Korea) Choi Dong-whee (South Korea) Kim Dylan Seong-kwan	4	2
3	(Thailand) Sa Ratiwatana (Thailand) So Ratiwatana	6	6
WC	(South Korea) Ho Chung (South Korea) J-s Nam	4	4
(Japan) T Ito (Japan) H Kondo	6	6
(Switzerland) S Bohli (Switzerland) M Chiudinelli	6^{3}	1
2	(United States) JP Fruttero (South Africa) R Klaasen	7^{7}	6

Quarterfinals
1	(Australia) J Kerr (United States) D Martin	7^{7}	6
(South Africa) R de Voest (Bosnia and Herzegovina) A Delić	6^{5}	4
4	(India) P Raja (India) D Sharan	7^{7}	6
(Canada) P-L Duclos (Italy) R Ghedin	6^{5}	4
(Moldova) R Borvanov (Japan) Y Sugita	0	6	[6]
3	(Thailand) Sa Ratiwatana (Thailand) So Ratiwatana	6	3	[10]
(Japan) T Ito (Japan) H Kondo	4	6^{5}
2	(United States) JP Fruttero (South Africa) R Klaasen	6	7^{7}

Semifinals
1	(Australia) J Kerr (United States) D Martin	2	7^{8}	[3]
4	(India) P Raja (India) D Sharan	6	6^{6}	[10]
3	(Thailand) Sa Ratiwatana (Thailand) So Ratiwatana	7	6
2	(United States) JP Fruttero (South Africa) R Klaasen	5	2

Final
4	(India) P Raja (India) D Sharan	4	6^{3}
3	(Thailand) Sa Ratiwatana (Thailand) So Ratiwatana	6	7^{7}
