= 2011 Samsung Securities Cup – Men's singles =

Men's singles
- 2011 Samsung Securities Cup

Final
- Champion: (Chinese Taipei) Lu Yen-hsun
- Runner-up: (Chinese Taipei) Jimmy Wang
- Score: 7–5, 6–3

Events
| Singles | men | women |
| Doubles | men | women |
| ← 2010 · | Samsung Securities Cup | · 2012 → |

Lu Yen-hsun successfully defended his title by defeating Jimmy Wang 7–5, 6–3 in the final.

== Seeds ==
1. (Chinese Taipei) Lu Yen-hsun (champion)
2. (Slovenia) Grega Žemlja (first round)
3. (Japan) Go Soeda (second round)
4. (Japan) Tatsuma Ito (second round)
5. (South Africa) Rik de Voest (quarterfinals)
6. (France) Florent Serra (second round)
7. (Belarus) Uladzimir Ignatik (second round)
8. (Poland) Michał Przysiężny (first round)

== Draw ==
=== Key ===
- Q = Qualifier
- WC = Wild card
- LL = Lucky loser
- Alt = Alternate
- SE = Special exempt
- PR = Protected ranking
- ITF = ITF entry
- JE = Junior exempt
- w/o = Walkover
- r = Retired
- d = Defaulted
- SR = Special ranking

=== Finals ===
Semifinals
1 | (Chinese Taipei) Lu Yen-hsun | 6 | 6
(Switzerland) Stéphane Bohli | 4 | 1
(Chinese Taipei) Jimmy Wang | 4 | 6 | 6
(Bosnia and Herzegovina) Amer Delić | 6 | 3 | 4

Final
1 | (Chinese Taipei) Lu Yen-hsun | 7 | 6
(Chinese Taipei) Jimmy Wang | 5 | 3

=== Top half ===
First round
1 | (Chinese Taipei) Y-h Lu | 6 | 6
Q | (United States) D Martin | 3 | 2
(Japan) Y Sugita | 6 | 6
(United States) K Kim | 1 | 3
Q | (Japan) T Matsui | 6 | 6
(South Korea) Y-j Kim | 4 | 0
Q | (South Korea) J-w Na | 4 | 6^{5}
5 | (South Africa) R de Voest | 6 | 7^{7}
3 | (Japan) G Soeda | 6 | 6
(Moldova) R Borvanov | 1 | 2
Q | (South Korea) S-y Jeong | 6 | 1 | 4
(Switzerland) S Bohli | 4 | 6 | 6
(Switzerland) M Chiudinelli | 6 | 6
(South Africa) R Klaasen | 3 | 2
WC | (South Korea) S-j Cho | 3 | 3
6 | (France) F Serra | 6 | 6

Second round
1 | (Chinese Taipei) Y-h Lu | 7^{7} | 2 | 6
(Japan) Y Sugita | 6^{3} | 6 | 3
Q | (Japan) T Matsui | 4 | 3
5 | (South Africa) R de Voest | 6 | 6
3 | (Japan) G Soeda | 3 | 4
(Switzerland) S Bohli | 6 | 6
(Switzerland) M Chiudinelli | 6 | 6
6 | (France) F Serra | 3 | 1

Quarterfinals
1 | (Chinese Taipei) Y-h Lu | 6 | 4 | 6
5 | (South Africa) R de Voest | 4 | 6 | 2
(Switzerland) S Bohli | 5 | 6 | 6
(Switzerland) M Chiudinelli | 7 | 0 | 2

Semifinals
1 | (Chinese Taipei) Y-h Lu | 6 | 6
(Switzerland) S Bohli | 4 | 1

=== Bottom half ===
First round
7 | (Belarus) U Ignatik | 6 | 6
(Chinese Taipei) T Chen | 1 | 1
(Canada) P-L Duclos | 4 | 6^{1}
(Chinese Taipei) T-h Yang | 6 | 7^{7}
(Thailand) D Udomchoke | 2 | 5
(Chinese Taipei) J Wang | 6 | 7
(Bulgaria) D Kutrovsky | 7^{7} | 4 | 3
4 | (Japan) T Ito | 6^{5} | 6 | 6
8 | (Poland) M Przysiężny | 3 | 6^{5}
(Bosnia and Herzegovina) A Delić | 6 | 7^{7}
(Japan) H Moriya | 1 | 2
(Italy) R Ghedin | 6 | 6
WC | (South Korea) J-s Nam | 2 | 2
WC | (South Korea) M-k Song | 6 | 6
(South Korea) Ho Chung | 6^{9} | 6 | 6
2 | (Slovenia) G Žemlja | 7^{11} | 4 | 3

Second round
7 | (Belarus) U Ignatik | 6 | 6^{3} | 6^{7}
(Chinese Taipei) T-h Yang | 3 | 7^{7} | 7^{9}
(Chinese Taipei) J Wang | 6 | 6
4 | (Japan) T Ito | 4 | 2
(Bosnia and Herzegovina) A Delić | 7 | 7^{7}
(Italy) R Ghedin | 5 | 6^{5}
WC | (South Korea) M-k Song | 1 | 6 | 3
(South Korea) Ho Chung | 6 | 3 | 6

Quarterfinals
(Chinese Taipei) T-h Yang | 7 | 0 | 5
(Chinese Taipei) J Wang | 5 | 6 | 7
(Bosnia and Herzegovina) A Delić | 7 | 6
(South Korea) Ho Chung | 5 | 4

Semifinals
(Chinese Taipei) J Wang | 4 | 6 | 6
(Bosnia and Herzegovina) A Delić | 6 | 3 | 4
