= 2012 Samsung Securities Cup – Men's doubles =

Men's doubles
- 2012 Samsung Securities Cup

Final
- Champions: (Chinese Taipei) Lee Hsin-han (Chinese Taipei) Peng Hsien-yin
- Runners-up: (South Korea) Lim Yong-Kyu (South Korea) Nam Ji-Sung
- Score: 7–6^{(7–3)}, 7–5

Events
Singles	men	women
Doubles	men	women
← 2011 ·	Samsung Securities Cup	· 2013 →

Sanchai Ratiwatana and Sonchat Ratiwatana were the defending champions.
Lee Hsin-han and Peng Hsien-yin won the final 7–6^{(7–3)}, 7–5 against Lim Yong-Kyu and Nam Ji-Sung.

== Seeds ==
1. (Thailand) Sanchai Ratiwatana / (Thailand) Sonchat Ratiwatana (quarterfinals)
2. (South Africa) Rik de Voest / (Australia) Jordan Kerr (first round)
3. (India) Yuki Bhambri / (India) Divij Sharan (first round, withdrew)
4. (Chinese Taipei) Hsieh Cheng-peng / (Australia) Brydan Klein (first round)

== Draw ==
=== Key ===
- Q = Qualifier
- WC = Wild card
- LL = Lucky loser
- Alt = Alternate
- SE = Special exempt
- PR = Protected ranking
- ITF = ITF entry
- JE = Junior exempt
- w/o = Walkover
- r = Retired
- d = Defaulted
- SR = Special ranking

=== Draw ===
First round
1	(Thailand) Sa Ratiwatana (Thailand) So Ratiwatana	3	6	[10]
(Thailand) W Doakmaiklee (Thailand) D Udomchoke	6	4	[2]
(Ukraine) S Bubka (Ukraine) N Nedovyesov	4	1
(Poland) M Kowalczyk (Poland) M Przysiężny	6	6
4	(Chinese Taipei) C-p Hsieh (Australia) B Klein	4	6^{6}
(Uzbekistan) F Dustov (Italy) T Fabbiano	6	7^{8}
WC	(South Korea) Noh Sang-Woo (South Korea) J-M Seol	4	2
WC	(South Korea) Y-K Lim (South Korea) Nam Ji-Sung	6	6
(Canada) É Chvojka (Belarus) U Ignatik	6	6
WC	(South Korea) Hong Hong (South Korea) S-Y Jeong	2	3
(Japan) Y Sugita (Chinese Taipei) J Wang	w/o
3	(India) Y Bhambri (India) D Sharan
(United States) J Cerretani (Netherlands) M Middelkoop	6	6
(Japan) H Moriya (Israel) A Weintraub	4	3
(Chinese Taipei) H-h Lee (Chinese Taipei) H-y Peng	6	6^{3}	[10]
2	(South Africa) R de Voest (Australia) J Kerr	1	7^{7}	[8]

Quarterfinals
1	(Thailand) Sa Ratiwatana (Thailand) So Ratiwatana	4	6	[6]
(Poland) M Kowalczyk (Poland) M Przysiężny	6	1	[10]
(Uzbekistan) F Dustov (Italy) T Fabbiano	3	1
WC	(South Korea) Y-K Lim (South Korea) Nam Ji-Sung	6	6
(Canada) É Chvojka (Belarus) U Ignatik	0	6	[10]
(Japan) Y Sugita (Chinese Taipei) J Wang	6	2	[7]
(United States) J Cerretani (Netherlands) M Middelkoop	3	4
(Chinese Taipei) H-h Lee (Chinese Taipei) H-y Peng	6	6

Semifinals
(Poland) M Kowalczyk (Poland) M Przysiężny	4	6	[8]
WC	(South Korea) Y-K Lim (South Korea) Nam Ji-Sung	6	1	[10]
(Canada) É Chvojka (Belarus) U Ignatik	6^{6}	4
(Chinese Taipei) H-h Lee (Chinese Taipei) H-y Peng	7^{8}	6

Final
WC	(South Korea) Y-K Lim (South Korea) Nam Ji-Sung	6^{3}	5
(Chinese Taipei) H-h Lee (Chinese Taipei) H-y Peng	7^{7}	7
