= 2010 Samsung Securities Cup – Singles =

Singles
- 2010 Samsung Securities Cup

Final
- Champion: (Chinese Taipei) Lu Yen-hsun
- Runner-up: (South Africa) Kevin Anderson
- Score: 6–3, 6–4

Events
Singles	Doubles
← 2009 ·	Samsung Securities Cup	· 2011 →

Lukáš Lacko was the defending champion but decided not to participate.
Lu Yen-hsun won the tournament after defeating Kevin Anderson 6–3, 6–4 in the final.

== Seeds ==
1. (Chinese Taipei) Lu Yen-hsun (champion)
2. (South Africa) Kevin Anderson (final)
3. (France) Florent Serra (semifinals)
4. (Israel) Dudi Sela (quarterfinals, retired)
5. (India) Somdev Devvarman (second round)
6. (Portugal) Frederico Gil (first round)
7. (Japan) Go Soeda (first round)
8. (Slovenia) Grega Žemlja (second round)

== Draw ==
=== Key ===
- Q = Qualifier
- WC = Wild card
- LL = Lucky loser
- Alt = Alternate
- SE = Special exempt
- PR = Protected ranking
- ITF = ITF entry
- JE = Junior exempt
- w/o = Walkover
- r = Retired
- d = Defaulted
- SR = Special ranking

=== Finals ===
Semifinals
1/WC	(Chinese Taipei) Lu Yen-hsun	6	6
3	(France) Florent Serra	3	4
(Japan) Yuichi Sugita	5	1
2	(South Africa) Kevin Anderson	7	6

Final
1/WC	(Chinese Taipei) Lu Yen-hsun	6	6
2	(South Africa) Kevin Anderson	3	4

=== Top half ===
First round
1/WC	(Chinese Taipei) Y-h Lu	6	6
WC	(South Korea) H Chung	3	2
(Spain) A Menéndez-Maceiras	2	4
(Chinese Taipei) T-h Yang	6	6
(Russia) E Kirillov	0	3
(United States) A Bogomolov Jr.	6	6
WC	(South Korea) S-w Noh	1	2
5	(India) S Devvarman	6	6
3	(France) F Serra	3	6	6
(Japan) T Ito	6	3	3
(Croatia) F Škugor	5	6	6
(Australia) R Junaid	7	2	3
(Luxembourg) G Müller	6	6
WC	(South Korea) S-j Cho	1	2
(Russia) A Kudryavtsev	6	6
7	(Japan) G Soeda	0	2

Second round
1/WC	(Chinese Taipei) Y-h Lu	3	6	6
(Chinese Taipei) T-h Yang	6	3	3
(United States) A Bogomolov Jr.	6	6
5	(India) S Devvarman	3	4
3	(France) F Serra	6	6
(Croatia) F Škugor	2	4
(Luxembourg) G Müller	4	4
(Russia) A Kudryavtsev	6	6

Quarterfinals
1/WC	(Chinese Taipei) Y-h Lu	6	6
(United States) A Bogomolov Jr.	4	4
3	(France) F Serra	w/o
(Russia) A Kudryavtsev

Semifinals
1/WC	(Chinese Taipei) Y-h Lu	6	6
3	(France) F Serra	3	4

=== Bottom half ===
First round
8	(Slovenia) G Žemlja	6	6
Q	(Croatia) A Pavić	0	3
(Switzerland) M Lammer	1	2
(Japan) Y Sugita	6	6
(Japan) T Suzuki	1	3
(Belarus) U Ignatik	6	6
Q	(South Korea) D Yoo	6	2	3
4	(Israel) D Sela	3	6	6
6	(Portugal) F Gil	6^{4}	6	3
(Canada) V Pospisil	7	3	6
(Slovakia) M Semjan	4
(Czech Republic) D Lojda	1^{r}
(Slovakia) A Martin	6	6
Q	(Philippines) TC Huey	3	0
Q	(South Korea) J-s Nam	1	1
2	(South Africa) K Anderson	6	6

Second round
8	(Slovenia) G Žemlja	4	2
(Japan) Y Sugita	6	6
(Belarus) U Ignatik	2	6^{3}
4	(Israel) D Sela	6	7
(Canada) V Pospisil	4	4
(Slovakia) M Semjan	6	6
(Slovakia) A Martin	5	3
2	(South Africa) K Anderson	7	6

Quarterfinals
(Japan) Y Sugita	5	2
4	(Israel) D Sela	7	1^{r}
(Slovakia) M Semjan	6^{4}	4
2	(South Africa) K Anderson	7	6

Semifinals
(Japan) Y Sugita	5	1
2	(South Africa) K Anderson	7	6
