= 2013 Samsung Securities Cup – Women's singles =

Women's singles
- 2013 Samsung Securities Cup

Final
- Champion: (South Korea) Han Na-lae
- Runner-up: (South Korea) Kim Da-hye
- Score: 6–4, 6–4

Events
Singles	men	women
Doubles	men	women
← 2012 ·	Samsung Securities Cup	· 2014 →

Erika Sema was the defending champion, having won the event in 2012, but chose not to compete in 2013.

Han Na-lae won the tournament, defeating Kim Da-hye in the all-Korean final, 6–4, 6–4.

== Seeds ==
1. (Japan) Eri Hozumi (first round)
2. (Japan) Junri Namigata (first round)
3. (Japan) Shuko Aoyama (second round)
4. (Thailand) Nudnida Luangnam (second round)
5. (China) Liu Fangzhou (first round)
6. (Israel) Deniz Khazaniuk (second round)
7. (Japan) Nao Hibino (quarterfinals)
8. (South Korea) Jang Su-jeong (quarterfinals)

== Main draw ==
=== Key ===
- Q = Qualifier
- WC = Wild card
- LL = Lucky loser
- Alt = Alternate
- SE = Special exempt
- PR = Protected ranking
- ITF = ITF entry
- JE = Junior exempt
- w/o = Walkover
- r = Retired
- d = Defaulted
- SR = Special ranking

=== Finals ===
Semifinals
(South Korea) Han Na-lae	6^{4}	6	6
(Russia) Varvara Flink	7^{7}	3	2
Q	(South Korea) Kim Da-hye	6	7
(South Korea) Lee So-ra	3	5

Final
(South Korea) Han Na-lae	6	6
Q	(South Korea) Kim Da-hye	4	4

=== Top half ===
First round
1	(Japan) E Hozumi	6	5	6^{4}
Q	(South Korea) S-y Hong	1	7	7^{7}
(South Korea) Y-r Lee	6	6
(Japan) A Omae	4	0
(Serbia) B Bonić	6	0	1
(Japan) S Akita	2	6	6
(South Korea) N-l Han	4	6	6
5	(China) F Liu	6	3	3
3	(Japan) S Aoyama	6	6
(Russia) Y Sizikova	3	2
(Russia) V Flink	6	6
(Japan) M Kato	2	0
Q	(Japan) R Fujiwara	0^{r}
WC	(South Korea) M-h Yu	4
WC	(South Korea) H Lee	1	0
8	(South Korea) S-j Jang	6	6

Second round
Q	(South Korea) S-y Hong	2	2
(South Korea) Y-r Lee	6	6
(Japan) S Akita	4	2
(South Korea) N-l Han	6	6
3	(Japan) S Aoyama	4	6	1
(Russia) V Flink	6	1	6
WC	(South Korea) M-h Yu	1^{r}
8	(South Korea) S-j Jang	4

Quarterfinals
(South Korea) Y-r Lee	6	2^{r}
(South Korea) N-l Han	4	5
(Russia) V Flink	6	6
8	(South Korea) S-j Jang	4	3

Semifinals
(South Korea) N-l Han	6^{4}	6	6
(Russia) V Flink	7^{7}	3	2

=== Bottom half ===
First round
6	(Israel) D Khazaniuk	6	6
WC	(South Korea) S-h Han	1	4
Q	(South Korea) S-j Kim	5	3
(China) J Lu	7	6
Q	(South Korea) Y-w Jeong	3	2
Q	(South Korea) D-h Kim	6	6
(Philippines) K Lehnert	6	0	6^{1}
4	(Thailand) N Luangnam	4	6	7^{7}
7	(Japan) N Hibino	6	6
Q	(China) L Zhu	1	4
Q	(South Korea) J-h Choi	6	6
Q	(South Korea) S-j Kim	4	3
WC	(South Korea) S-k Kang	6	4	3
(Japan) M Miyamura	1	6	6
(South Korea) S-r Lee	7	6
2	(Japan) J Namigata	5	2

Second round
6	(Israel) D Khazaniuk	5	2
(China) J Lu	7	6
Q	(South Korea) D-h Kim	6	6
4	(Thailand) N Luangnam	4	2
7	(Japan) N Hibino	6	6
Q	(South Korea) J-h Choi	2	2
(Japan) M Miyamura	6^{3}	1
(South Korea) S-r Lee	7^{7}	6

Quarterfinals
(China) J Lu	6	2	5
Q	(South Korea) D-h Kim	2	6	7
7	(Japan) N Hibino	7	2	6^{3}
(South Korea) S-r Lee	5	6	7^{7}

Semifinals
Q	(South Korea) D-h Kim	6	7
(South Korea) S-r Lee	3	5
