= 2013 Samsung Securities Cup =

- Date: 28 October–3 November
- Edition: 14th (men); 3rd (women)
- Category: ATP Challenger Tour; ITF Women's Circuit
- Prize money: $50,000 (men) $25,000 (women)
- Surface: Hard
- Location: Seoul, South Korea

Champions

Men's singles
- (Serbia) Dušan Lajović

Women's singles
- (South Korea) Han Na-lae

Men's doubles
- (Croatia) Marin Draganja / (Croatia) Mate Pavić

Women's doubles
- (South Korea) Han Na-lae / (South Korea) Yoo Mi
- Samsung Securities Cup

The 2013 Samsung Securities Cup was a professional tennis tournament played on hard courts. It was the 14th edition of the men's tournament which was part of the 2013 ATP Challenger Tour and the third edition of the women's event, which was part of the 2013 ITF Women's Circuit. It took place in Seoul, South Korea, on 28 October–3 November 2013.

== Men's singles main draw entrants ==
=== Seeds ===
Country	Player	Rank^{1}	Seed
TPE	Lu Yen-hsun	60	1
GER	Julian Reister	87	2
SLO	Blaž Kavčič	107	3
JPN	Go Soeda	118	4
SRB	Dušan Lajović	136	5
JPN	Yuichi Sugita	149	6
GBR	Daniel Evans	151	7
JPN	Hiroki Moriya	183	8

- ^{1} Rankings as of 21 October 2013

=== Other entrants ===
The following players received wildcards into the singles main draw:

- (South Korea) Chung Hyeon
- (South Korea) Lee Duck-hee
- (South Korea) Nam Ji-sung
- (South Korea) Kim Young-seok

The following player received entry with a Protected Ranking:

- (United States) Daniel Kosakowski

The following players received entry from the qualifying draw:

- (Belarus) Sergey Betov
- (Japan) Yuichi Ito
- (Japan) Toshihide Matsui
- (Chinese Taipei) Yang Tsung-hua

== Women's singles main draw entrants ==
=== Seeds ===
Country	Player	Rank^{1}	Seed
JPN	Eri Hozumi	220	1
JPN	Junri Namigata	258	2
JPN	Shuko Aoyama	287	3
THA	Nudnida Luangnam	299	4
CHN	Liu Fangzhou	301	5
ISR	Deniz Khazaniuk	316	6
JPN	Nao Hibino	319	7
KOR	Jang Su-jeong	338	8

- ^{1} Rankings as of 21 October 2013

=== Other entrants ===
The following players received wildcards into the singles main draw:

- (South Korea) Han Sung-hee
- (South Korea) Kang Seo-kyung
- (South Korea) Lee Hwa
- (South Korea) Yu Min-hwa

The following players received entry from the qualifying draw:

- (South Korea) Choi Ji-hee
- (Japan) Rika Fujiwara
- (South Korea) Hong Seung-yeon
- (South Korea) Jeong Yeong-won
- (South Korea) Kim Da-hye
- (South Korea) Kim So-jung
- (South Korea) Kim Sun-jung
- (China) Zhu Lin

== Champions ==
=== Men's singles ===
- (Serbia) Dušan Lajović def. (Germany) Julian Reister by Walkover

=== Women's singles ===
- (South Korea) Han Na-lae def. (South Korea) Kim Da-hye 6–4, 6–4

=== Men's doubles ===
- (Croatia) Marin Draganja / (Croatia) Mate Pavić def. (Chinese Taipei) Lee Hsin-han / (Chinese Taipei) Peng Hsien-yin 7–5, 6–2

=== Women's doubles ===
- (South Korea) Han Na-lae / (South Korea) Yoo Mi def. (South Korea) Kim Sun-jung / (South Korea) Yu Min-hwa 2–6, 6–3, [10–6]
