= 2009 Samsung Securities Cup – Singles =

Singles
- 2009 Samsung Securities Cup

Final
- Champion: (Slovakia) Lukáš Lacko
- Runner-up: (Czech Republic) Dušan Lojda
- Score: 6–4, 6–2

Events
Singles	Doubles
← 2008 ·	Samsung Securities Cup	· 2010 →

South Korean player Lee Hyung-taik dominated the nine first years of competition at the event, winning seven titles in singles, and another in doubles. He was the champion in 2009, but he didn't defend his title, because retired due to left thigh injury in his match against Cho Soong-jae already in the first round.
Lukáš Lacko won in the final 6–4, 6–2, against Dušan Lojda.

== Seeds ==
1. (Cyprus) ~~Marcos Baghdatis~~ (withdrew)
2. (Chinese Taipei) Lu Yen-hsun (quarterfinals)
3. (Netherlands) Thiemo de Bakker (semifinals)
4. (India) Somdev Devvarman (quarterfinals)
5. (Slovakia) Lukáš Lacko (champion)
6. (South Korea) Lee Hyung-taik (first round, retired due to left thigh injury)
7. (Israel) Harel Levy (second round)
8. (Thailand) Danai Udomchoke (second round, retired due to right shoulder injury)
9. (Japan) Go Soeda (second round)

== Draw ==
=== Key ===
- Q = Qualifier
- WC = Wild card
- LL = Lucky loser
- Alt = Alternate
- SE = Special exempt
- PR = Protected ranking
- ITF = ITF entry
- JE = Junior exempt
- w/o = Walkover
- r = Retired
- d = Defaulted
- SR = Special ranking

=== Finals ===
Semifinals
(United States) Lester Cook	7	4	2
(Czech Republic) Dušan Lojda	5	6	6
3	(Netherlands) Thiemo de Bakker	1	4
5	(Slovakia) Lukáš Lacko	6	6

Final
(Czech Republic) Dušan Lojda	4	2
5	(Slovakia) Lukáš Lacko	6	6

=== Top half ===
First round
9	(Japan) G Soeda	6	6
(United States) T Widom	2	2
(United States) L Cook	3	6	6
(Latvia) A Juška	6	3	0
(Slovakia) K Čapkovič	2	3
LL	(Australia) G Jones	6	6
Q	(Netherlands) I Sijsling	3	2
7	(Israel) H Levy	6	6
4	(India) S Devvarman	6	2
(South Africa) R de Voest	2	0	r
Q	(Denmark) F Nielsen	6^{6}	6	2
(Slovakia) P Červenák	7	4	6
(Czech Republic) D Lojda	6	6
(United States) A Kuznetsov	4	4
WC	(South Korea) Y-k Lim	6	3	5
8	(Thailand) D Udomchoke	3	6	7

Second round
9	(Japan) G Soeda	4	6	4
(United States) L Cook	6	4	6
LL	(Australia) G Jones	4	6	6
7	(Israel) H Levy	6	4	3
4	(India) S Devvarman	3	6	6
(Slovakia) P Červenák	6	3	4
(Czech Republic) D Lojda	6	2
8	(Thailand) D Udomchoke	2	0	r

Quarterfinals
(United States) L Cook	6	6
LL	(Australia) G Jones	4	4
4	(India) S Devvarman	4	2
(Czech Republic) D Lojda	6	6

Semifinals
(United States) L Cook	7	4	2
(Czech Republic) D Lojda	5	6	6

=== Bottom half ===
First round
6	(South Korea) H-t Lee	4	1	r
WC	(South Korea) S-j Cho	6	0
(Australia) M Matosevic	6	6
WC	(South Korea) S-y Kim	3	3
WC	(South Korea) S-w Noh	2	1
Q	(Japan) T Suzuki	6	6
(Slovakia) M Kližan	2	5
3	(Netherlands) T de Bakker	6	7
5	(Slovakia) L Lacko	4	6	7
(Germany) T Kamke	6	1	6^{2}
Q	(Germany) M Bachinger	6	6
(Japan) T Ito	1	0
(India) P Amritraj	6	6
(South Korea) K-t Im	3	1
(Czech Republic) P Šnobel	7	2	0
2	(Chinese Taipei) Y-h Lu	5	6	6

Second round
WC	(South Korea) S-j Cho	3	2
(Australia) M Matosevic	6	6
Q	(Japan) T Suzuki	4	3
3	(Netherlands) T de Bakker	6	6
5	(Slovakia) L Lacko	7	6
Q	(Germany) M Bachinger	6^{2}	3
(India) P Amritraj	1	3
2	(Chinese Taipei) Y-h Lu	6	6

Quarterfinals
(Australia) M Matosevic	3	2
3	(Netherlands) T de Bakker	6	6
5	(Slovakia) L Lacko	6	4	6
2	(Chinese Taipei) Y-h Lu	2	6	3

Semifinals
3	(Netherlands) T de Bakker	1	4
5	(Slovakia) L Lacko	6	6
