= 2009 Samsung Securities Cup – Doubles =

Doubles
- 2009 Samsung Securities Cup

Final
- Champions: (South Africa) Rik de Voest (Chinese Taipei) Lu Yen-hsun
- Runners-up: (Thailand) Sanchai Ratiwatana (Thailand) Sonchat Ratiwatana
- Score: 7–6(5), 3–6, [10–6]

Events
Singles	Doubles
- Samsung Securities Cup

Łukasz Kubot and Oliver Marach chose to not defend their last year's title.
Rik de Voest and Lu Yen-hsun defeated Sanchai Ratiwatana and Sonchat Ratiwatana 7–6(5), 3–6, [10–6] in the final.

== Seeds ==
1. (Thailand) Sanchai Ratiwatana / (Thailand) Sonchat Ratiwatana (final)
2. (Israel) Amir Hadad / (Israel) Harel Levy (quarterfinals)
3. (South Africa) Rik de Voest / (Chinese Taipei) Lu Yen-hsun (champions)
4. (Denmark) Frederik Nielsen / (Austria) Martin Slanar (quarterfinals)

== Draw ==
Key

- Q = Qualifier
- WC = Wild card
- LL = Lucky loser
- Alt = Alternate
- ITF = ITF entry
- PR = Protected ranking
- SR = Special ranking
- SE = Special exempt
- JE = Junior exempt
- JR = Junior Accelerator Programme entrant
- CO = College Accelerator Programme entrant
- NG = Next Gen Accelerator Program entrant
- w/o = Walkover
- r = Retired
- d = Defaulted

=== Draw ===
First round
1	(Thailand) Sa Ratiwatana (Thailand) So Ratiwatana	6	6
(India) P Amritraj (Australia) M Matosevic	4	4
(Australia) G Jones (Thailand) D Udomchoke	4	2
(United States) L Cook (United States) A Kuznetsov	6	6
4	(Denmark) F Nielsen (Austria) M Slanar	6	6
WC	(South Korea) S-j Cho (South Korea) S-w Noh	2	3
(Australia) S Kadir (India) P Raja	5	6	[8]
(Japan) H Kondo (Japan) G Soeda	7	2	[10]
WC	(South Korea) S-y Kim Jr. (South Korea) H-t Lee	w/o
Q	(Latvia) A Juška (Russia) D Sitak
WC	(South Korea) J-s An (South Korea) Y-k Lim	5	0
3	(South Africa) R de Voest (Chinese Taipei) Y-h Lu	7	6
(Netherlands) T de Bakker (Netherlands) I Sijsling	4	7	[10]
(Slovakia) M Kližan (Slovakia) L Lacko	6	6^{2}	[8]
(India) S Devvarman (United States) T Widom	1	6^{7}
2	(Israel) A Hadad (Israel) H Levy	6	7

Quarterfinals
1	(Thailand) Sa Ratiwatana (Thailand) So Ratiwatana	7	6
(United States) L Cook (United States) A Kuznetsov	5	4
4	(Denmark) F Nielsen (Austria) M Slanar	5	6	[7]
(Japan) H Kondo (Japan) G Soeda	7	0	[10]
Q	(Latvia) A Juška (Russia) D Sitak	3	2
3	(South Africa) R de Voest (Chinese Taipei) Y-h Lu	6	6
(Netherlands) T de Bakker (Netherlands) I Sijsling	6	3	[10]
2	(Israel) A Hadad (Israel) H Levy	4	6	[3]

Semifinals
1	(Thailand) Sa Ratiwatana (Thailand) So Ratiwatana	6	6
(Japan) H Kondo (Japan) G Soeda	1	4
3	(South Africa) R de Voest (Chinese Taipei) Y-h Lu	6	6
(Netherlands) T de Bakker (Netherlands) I Sijsling	3	2

Finals
1	(Thailand) Sa Ratiwatana (Thailand) So Ratiwatana	6^{5}	6	[6]
3	(South Africa) R de Voest (Chinese Taipei) Y-h Lu	7	3	[10]
