= 2012 Samsung Securities Cup – Men's singles =

Men's singles
- 2012 Samsung Securities Cup

Final
- Champion: (Chinese Taipei) Lu Yen-hsun
- Runner-up: (Japan) Yūichi Sugita
- Score: 6–3, 7–6^{(7–4)}

Events
Singles	men	women
Doubles	men	women
← 2011 ·	Samsung Securities Cup	· 2013 →

Lu Yen-hsun successfully defended his title by defeating Yūichi Sugita 6–3, 7–6^{(7–4)} in the final.

== Seeds ==
1. (Chinese Taipei) Lu Yen-hsun (champion)
2. (Japan) Tatsuma Ito (second round)
3. (Russia) Dmitry Tursunov (first round)
4. (Tunisia) Malek Jaziri (second round)
5. (France) Kenny de Schepper (quarterfinals)
6. (Japan) Yūichi Sugita (final)
7. (Chinese Taipei) Jimmy Wang (semifinals)
8. (Belarus) Uladzimir Ignatik (quarterfinals)

== Draw ==
=== Key ===
- Q = Qualifier
- WC = Wild card
- LL = Lucky loser
- Alt = Alternate
- ITF = ITF entry
- PR = Protected ranking
- SR = Special ranking
- SE = Special exempt
- JE = Junior exempt
- JR = Junior Accelerator Programme entrant
- CO = College Accelerator Programme entrant
- NG = Next Gen Accelerator Program entrant
- w/o = Walkover
- r = Retired
- d = Defaulted

=== Finals ===
Semifinals
1	(Chinese Taipei) Lu Yen-hsun	7^{12}	6
(Thailand) Danai Udomchoke	6^{10}	3
7	(Chinese Taipei) Jimmy Wang	0	3
6	(Japan) Yūichi Sugita	6	6

Final
1	(Chinese Taipei) Lu Yen-hsun	6	7^{7}
6	(Japan) Yūichi Sugita	3	6^{4}

=== Top half ===
First round
1	(Chinese Taipei) Y-h Lu	6	6
(Italy) T Fabbiano	1	2
(Poland) M Przysiężny	6	3	5
Q	(Netherlands) M Middelkoop	3	6	7
(Chinese Taipei) T-h Yang	4	6	4
(Ukraine) S Bubka	6	3	6
(Germany) P Gojowczyk	4	2
8	(Belarus) U Ignatik	6	6
4	(Tunisia) M Jaziri	1	6	6
(Japan) H Moriya	6	3	1
(South Africa) R de Voest	6	6^{3}	3
(Thailand) D Udomchoke	0	7^{7}	6
(Uzbekistan) F Dustov	2	3
(United States) M Yani	6	6
(Ukraine) O Nedovyesov	7	6^{9}	4
5	(France) K de Schepper	5	7^{11}	6

Second round
1	(Chinese Taipei) Y-h Lu	5	6	6
Q	(Netherlands) M Middelkoop	7	3	2
(Ukraine) S Bubka	4	2
8	(Belarus) U Ignatik	6	6
4	(Tunisia) M Jaziri	3	4
(Thailand) D Udomchoke	6	6
(United States) M Yani	3	3
5	(France) K de Schepper	6	6

Quarterfinals
1	(Chinese Taipei) Y-h Lu	6	6
8	(Belarus) U Ignatik	1	1
(Thailand) D Udomchoke	4	6	6
5	(France) K de Schepper	6	1	4

Semifinals
1	(Chinese Taipei) Y-h Lu	7^{12}	6
(Thailand) D Udomchoke	6^{10}	3

=== Bottom half ===
First round
7	(Chinese Taipei) J Wang	6	6
(Israel) A Weintraub	3	1
(Chinese Taipei) T Chen	1	0^{r}
WC	(South Korea) Chung Hy-Eon	6	1
WC	(South Korea) Nam Ji-Sung	6	6
(Russia) A Kudryavtsev	3	2
(India) Y Bhambri	6	7^{7}
3	(Russia) D Tursunov	4	6^{5}
6	(Japan) Y Sugita	6	5	6
Q	(India) D Sharan	2	7	4
(Canada) É Chvojka	5	4
Q	(South Korea) J-w Na	7	6
Q	(South Korea) Lim Yong-Kyu	4	7^{7}	6
WC	(South Korea) H-w Nam	6	6^{4}	3
WC	(South Korea) S-Y Jeong	6	5	3
2	(Japan) T Ito	2	7	6

Second round
7	(Chinese Taipei) J Wang	6	6
WC	(South Korea) H-E Chung	2	2
WC	(South Korea) J-S Nam	1
(India) Y Bhambri	0^{r}
6	(Japan) Y Sugita	6^{6}	6	6
Q	(South Korea) J-w Na	7^{8}	1	2
Q	(South Korea) Y-K Lim	6	6
2	(Japan) T Ito	0	3

Quarterfinals
7	(Chinese Taipei) J Wang	6	6
WC	(South Korea) J-S Nam	3	2
6	(Japan) Y Sugita	6	3	6
Q	(South Korea) Y-K Lim	0	6	2

Semifinals
7	(Chinese Taipei) J Wang	0	3
6	(Japan) Y Sugita	6	6
