= 2010 Samsung Securities Cup – Doubles =

Doubles
- 2010 Samsung Securities Cup

Final
- Champions: (Australia) Rameez Junaid (Germany) Frank Moser
- Runners-up: (Canada) Vasek Pospisil (Canada) Adil Shamasdin
- Score: 6–3, 6–4

Events
Singles	Doubles
- Samsung Securities Cup

Rik de Voest and Lu Yen-hsun were the defending champions, but they did not compete in 2010 (Lu chose to play only in singles tennis).
Rameez Junaid and Frank Moser won the final against Vasek Pospisil and Adil Shamasdin 6–3, 6–4.

== Seeds ==
1. (Switzerland) Yves Allegro / (Austria) Martin Slanar (semifinals)
2. (Philippines) Treat Conrad Huey / (United Kingdom) Dominic Inglot (first round)
3. (Canada) Vasek Pospisil / (Canada) Adil Shamasdin (final)
4. (Australia) Rameez Junaid / (Germany) Frank Moser (champions)

== Draw ==
Key

- Q = Qualifier
- WC = Wild card
- LL = Lucky loser
- Alt = Alternate
- ITF = ITF entry
- PR = Protected ranking
- SR = Special ranking
- SE = Special exempt
- JE = Junior exempt
- JR = Junior Accelerator Programme entrant
- CO = College Accelerator Programme entrant
- NG = Next Gen Accelerator Program entrant
- w/o = Walkover
- r = Retired
- d = Defaulted

=== Draw ===
First round
1	(Switzerland) Y Allegro (Austria) M Slanar	7	6
WC	(South Korea) H-j Kim (South Korea) D-k Lee	5	2
(Belarus) U Ignatik (Slovakia) A Martin	3	6	[8]
(Japan) Y Sugita (Chinese Taipei) T-h Yang	6	3	[10]
4	(Australia) R Junaid (Germany) F Moser	6	3	[12]
WC	(South Korea) H Chung (South Korea) J-s Nam	3	6	[10]
(Japan) T Ito (Japan) T Suzuki	7	1	[10]
(Australia) S Kadir (India) P Raja	6^{7}	6	[5]
WC	(South Korea) S-j Cho (South Korea) S-w Noh	6	7
(Switzerland) M Lammer (Spain) A Menéndez-Maceiras	3	5
(India) S Devvarman (India) D Sharan	3	2
3	(Canada) V Pospisil (Canada) A Shamasdin	6	6
(Russia) E Kirillov (Slovakia) M Semjan	3	2
(United States) A Bogomolov Jr. (Israel) D Sela	6	6
(Croatia) F Škugor (Slovenia) G Žemlja	6	6^{6}	[11]
2	(Philippines) TC Huey (United Kingdom) D Inglot	4	7	[9]

Quarterfinals
1	(Switzerland) Y Allegro (Austria) M Slanar	6	6
(Japan) Y Sugita (Chinese Taipei) T-h Yang	1	4
4	(Australia) R Junaid (Germany) F Moser	6	7
(Japan) T Ito (Japan) T Suzuki	3	6^{1}
WC	(South Korea) S-j Cho (South Korea) S-w Noh	1	3
3	(Canada) V Pospisil (Canada) A Shamasdin	6	6
(United States) A Bogomolov Jr. (Israel) D Sela	6	6
(Croatia) F Škugor (Slovenia) G Žemlja	2	2

Semifinals
1	(Switzerland) Y Allegro (Austria) M Slanar	7	3	[4]
4	(Australia) R Junaid (Germany) F Moser	6^{5}	6	[10]
3	(Canada) V Pospisil (Canada) A Shamasdin
(United States) A Bogomolov Jr. (Israel) D Sela	w/o

Finals
4	(Australia) R Junaid (Germany) F Moser	6	6
3	(Canada) V Pospisil (Canada) A Shamasdin	3	4
