= 2013 Samsung Securities Cup – Men's singles =

Men's singles
- 2013 Samsung Securities Cup

Final
- Champion: (Serbia) Dušan Lajović
- Runner-up: (Germany) Julian Reister
- Score: walkover

Events
Singles	men	women
Doubles	men	women
← 2012 ·	Samsung Securities Cup	· 2014 →

Lu Yen-hsun was the three-time defending champion, but lost to Germain Gigounon in the first round.
Dušan Lajović won the title when Julian Reister withdrew with an illness.

== Seeds ==
1. (Chinese Taipei) Lu Yen-hsun (first round)
2. (Germany) Julian Reister (final, Withdrew, Illness)
3. (Slovenia) Blaž Kavčič (semifinals)
4. (Japan) Go Soeda (quarterfinals)
5. (Serbia) Dušan Lajović (champion)
6. (Japan) Yuichi Sugita (semifinals)
7. (United Kingdom) Daniel Evans (second round)
8. (Japan) Hiroki Moriya (quarterfinals)

== Main draw ==
=== Key ===
- Q = Qualifier
- WC = Wild card
- LL = Lucky loser
- Alt = Alternate
- ITF = ITF entry
- PR = Protected ranking
- SR = Special ranking
- SE = Special exempt
- JE = Junior exempt
- JR = Junior Accelerator Programme entrant
- CO = College Accelerator Programme entrant
- NG = Next Gen Accelerator Program entrant
- w/o = Walkover
- r = Retired
- d = Defaulted

=== Finals ===
Semifinals
5	(Serbia) Dušan Lajović	7	6
6	(Japan) Yuichi Sugita	5	2
3	(Slovenia) Blaž Kavčič	6	3	1
2	(Germany) Julian Reister	0	6	6

Final
5	(Serbia) Dušan Lajović	w/o
2	(Germany) Julian Reister

=== Top half ===
First round
1	(Chinese Taipei) Y-h Lu	6	2	4
(Belgium) G Gigounon	4	6	6
Q	(Japan) T Matsui	4	2
(China) D Wu	6	6
(Japan) T Daniel	3	6	6
PR	(United States) D Kosakowski	6	3	0
(Chinese Taipei) T Chen	6^{2}	1
5	(Serbia) D Lajović	7^{7}	6
4	(Japan) G Soeda	6	1	6
WC	(South Korea) H Chung	2	6	2
(Chinese Taipei) L-c Huang	7	4	4
(Japan) H Kondo	5	6	6
(Belgium) K Coppejans	3	3
(Republic of Ireland) J McGee	6	6
WC	(South Korea) J-s Nam	2	1
6	(Japan) Y Sugita	6	6

Second round
(Belgium) G Gigounon	6^{4}	4
(China) D Wu	7^{7}	6
(Japan) T Daniel	2	4
5	(Serbia) D Lajović	6	6
4	(Japan) G Soeda	6	6
(Japan) H Kondo	1	0
(Republic of Ireland) J McGee	6^{4}	5
6	(Japan) Y Sugita	7^{7}	7

Quarterfinals
(China) D Wu	2	6	2
5	(Serbia) D Lajović	6	4	6
4	(Japan) G Soeda	3	2
6	(Japan) Y Sugita	6	6

Semifinals
5	(Serbia) D Lajović	7	6
6	(Japan) Y Sugita	5	2

=== Bottom half ===
First round
7	(United Kingdom) D Evans	5	6	6
WC	(South Korea) Kim Young-seok	7	2	1
(China) Z Zhang	1	6	6
(South Korea) Y-k Lim	6	4	3
Q	(Chinese Taipei) T-h Yang	6	7^{7}
(Russia) A Kudryavtsev	2	6^{2}
(Japan) Shuichi Sekiguchi	4	0^{r}
3	(Slovenia) B Kavčič	6	3
8	(Japan) H Moriya	7	6
Q	(Japan) Y Ito	5	2
Q	(Belarus) S Betov	5	4
(Belgium) Y Reuter	7	6
(Russia) V Rudnev	6	7^{7}
WC	(South Korea) D-h Lee	3	6^{5}
(Bosnia and Herzegovina) M Bašić	2	3
2	(Germany) J Reister	6	6

Second round
7	(United Kingdom) D Evans	7^{7}	3	0
(China) Z Zhang	6^{2}	6	6
Q	(Chinese Taipei) T-h Yang	5	3
3	(Slovenia) B Kavčič	7	6
8	(Japan) H Moriya	6	3	6
(Belgium) Y Reuter	3	6	0
(Russia) V Rudnev	1	0
2	(Germany) J Reister	6	6

Quarterfinals
(China) Z Zhang	6^{3}	5
3	(Slovenia) B Kavčič	7^{7}	7
8	(Japan) H Moriya	5	1
2	(Germany) J Reister	7	6

Semifinals
3	(Slovenia) B Kavčič	6	3	1
2	(Germany) J Reister	0	6	6
