= 2009 Samsung Securities Cup =

- Date: 26 October – 1 November
- Edition: 10th
- Surface: Hard
- Location: Seoul, South Korea

Champions

Singles
- (Slovakia) Lukáš Lacko

Doubles
- (South Africa) Rik de Voest / (Chinese Taipei) Lu Yen-hsun
← 2008 ·	Samsung Securities Cup	· 2010 →

The 2009 Samsung Securities Cup was a professional tennis tournament played on outdoor hard courts. It was the tenth edition of the tournament which was part of the Tretorn SERIE+ of the 2009 ATP Challenger Tour. It took place in Seoul, South Korea between 26 October and 1 November 2009.

== ATP entrants ==
=== Seeds ===
Country	Player	Rank^{1}	Seed
CYP	~~Marcos Baghdatis~~	~~66~~	~~1~~
TPE	Lu Yen-hsun	102	2
NED	Thiemo de Bakker	113	3
IND	Somdev Devvarman	124	4
SVK	Lukáš Lacko	127	5
KOR	Lee Hyung-taik	136	6
ISR	Harel Levy	137	7
THA	Danai Udomchoke	139	8
JPN	Go Soeda	156	9

- Rankings are as of October 19, 2009.

=== Other entrants ===
The following players received wildcards into the singles main draw:

- (South Korea) Cho Soong-yae
- (South Korea) Kim Sun-yong
- (South Korea) Lim Yong-kyu
- (South Korea) Noh Sang-woo

The following players received entry from the qualifying draw:

- (Germany) Matthias Bachinger
- (Australia) Greg Jones (as a Lucky loser)
- (Denmark) Frederik Nielsen
- (Netherlands) Igor Sijsling
- (Japan) Takao Suzuki

== Champions ==
=== Singles ===
(Slovakia) Lukáš Lacko def. (Czech Republic) Dušan Lojda, 6–4, 6–2

=== Doubles ===
(South Africa) Rik de Voest / (Chinese Taipei) Lu Yen-hsun def. (Thailand) Sanchai Ratiwatana / (Thailand) Sonchat Ratiwatana, 7–6(5), 3–6, [10–6]
