= 2013 Samsung Securities Cup – Men's doubles =

Men's doubles
- 2013 Samsung Securities Cup

Final
- Champions: (Croatia) Marin Draganja (Croatia) Mate Pavić
- Runners-up: (Chinese Taipei) Lee Hsin-han (Chinese Taipei) Peng Hsien-yin
- Score: 7–5, 6–2

Events
Singles	men	women
Doubles	men	women
- Samsung Securities Cup

Lee Hsin-han and Peng Hsien-yin were the defending champions but lost to Huang Liang-Chi and Yang Tsung-hua.
Marin Draganja and Mate Pavić won the title over Lee Hsin-han and Peng Hsien-yin 7–5, 6–2.

== Seeds ==
1. (Croatia) Marin Draganja / (Croatia) Mate Pavić (champion)
2. (Australia) Rameez Junaid / (Germany) Frank Moser (quarterfinals)
3. (Thailand) Sanchai Ratiwatana / (Thailand) Sonchat Ratiwatana (first round)
4. (Chinese Taipei) Lee Hsin-han / (Chinese Taipei) Peng Hsien-yin (final)

== Draw ==
Key

- Q = Qualifier
- WC = Wild card
- LL = Lucky loser
- Alt = Alternate
- ITF = ITF entry
- PR = Protected ranking
- SR = Special ranking
- SE = Special exempt
- JE = Junior exempt
- JR = Junior Accelerator Programme entrant
- CO = College Accelerator Programme entrant
- NG = Next Gen Accelerator Program entrant
- w/o = Walkover
- r = Retired
- d = Defaulted

=== Draw ===
First round
1	(Croatia) M Draganja (Croatia) M Pavić	7	6
WC	(South Korea) Im Kyu-tae (South Korea) Lee Hyung-taik	5	'2
WC	(South Korea) Ho Chung (South Korea) J-s Nam	4	3
(Belgium) G Gigounon (Belgium) Y Reuter	6	6
3	(Thailand) Sa Ratiwatana (Thailand) So Ratiwatana	2	2
(Chinese Taipei) L-c Huang (Chinese Taipei) Y-h Yang	6	6
(Philippines) R Gonzales (New Zealand) A Sitak	6	6
(Japan) T Matsui (Japan) G Soeda	3	2
(Slovenia) B Kavčič (Brazil) B Sant'Anna	2	6	[7]
(Japan) Arata Onazawa (Japan) Y Sugita	6	2	[10]
(Japan) T Daniel (Republic of Ireland) J McGee	2	1
4	(Chinese Taipei) H-h Lee (Chinese Taipei) H-y Peng	6	6
(China) D Wu (China) Z Zhang	7	3	[15]
WC	(South Korea) Hy Chung (South Korea) Y-k Lim	5	6	[17]
(Bosnia and Herzegovina) M Bašić (Chinese Taipei) T Chen	3	4
2	(Australia) R Junaid (Germany) F Moser	6	6

Quarterfinals
1	(Croatia) M Draganja (Croatia) M Pavić	6	6
(Belgium) G Gigounon (Belgium) Y Reuter	3	4
(Chinese Taipei) L-c Huang (Chinese Taipei) Y-h Yang	5	6	[4]
(Philippines) R Gonzales (New Zealand) A Sitak	7	4	[10]
(Japan) A Onazawa (Japan) Y Sugita	2	4
4	(Chinese Taipei) H-h Lee (Chinese Taipei) H-y Peng	6	6
WC	(South Korea) Hy Chung (South Korea) Y-k Lim	6	3	[10]
2	(Australia) R Junaid (Germany) F Moser	4	6	[6]

Semifinals
1	(Croatia) M Draganja (Croatia) M Pavić	6	3	[11]
(Philippines) R Gonzales (New Zealand) A Sitak	4	6	[9]
4	(Chinese Taipei) H-h Lee (Chinese Taipei) H-y Peng	6	7^{7}
WC	(South Korea) Hy Chung (South Korea) Y-k Lim	3	6^{5}

Final
1	(Croatia) M Draganja (Croatia) M Pavić	7	6
4	(Chinese Taipei) H-h Lee (Chinese Taipei) H-y Peng	5	2
