= Kim Geon-hee =

Kim Geon-hee, Kim Gun-hee, Kim Keon-hee or Kim Kun-hee (Korean: 김건희) is the name of:

- Kim Keon Hee (born 1972), South Korean businesswoman
- Kim Gun-hee (footballer) (born 1995), South Korean footballer
- Kim Geon-hee (speed skater) (born 2000), South Korean short track speed skater
- Kim Geon-hui (born 2002), South Korean footballer
- Kim Geon-hee (baseball) (born 2004), South Korean baseball player
