= Kim Na-ri =

South Korean tennis player (born 1990)

- Country (sports): South Korea
- Born: 4 April 1990 (age 36)
- Plays: Right (two-handed backhand)
- Prize money: $87,441

Singles
- Career record: 244–119
- Career titles: 5 ITF
- Highest ranking: No. 286 (7 June 2010)

Doubles
- Career record: 247–95
- Career titles: 39 ITF
- Highest ranking: No. 221 (20 August 2018)
- Current ranking: No. 706 (26 October 2026)

Team competitions
- Fed Cup: 13–14
- Last updated on: 1 November 2026.

- Kim Na-ri
- Hangul: 김나리
- RR: Gim Nari
- MR: Kim Nari

Kim Na-ri (born 4 April 1990) is a South Korean tennis player.

She has career-high WTA rankings of 286 in singles, achieved on 7 June 2010, and 221 in doubles, set on 20 August 2018. Kim has won five singles and 39 doubles titles at tournaments of the ITF Women's World Tennis Tour.

Competing for the South Korea Fed Cup team, Kim has a win–loss record of 13–14 (10–11 in doubles), as of May 2024.

== ITF Circuit finals ==
=== Singles: 11 (5 titles, 6 runner-ups) ===
| Legend 25,000 tournaments 10/15,000 tournaments | Finals by surface Hard (5–5) Clay (0–1) |

| Result | W–L | Date | Tournament | Tier | Surface | Opponent | Score |
|---|---|---|---|---|---|---|---|
| Win | 1–0 | Jun 2009 | ITF Gimcheon, South Korea | 10k | Hard | (South Korea) Chang Kyung-mi | 6–4, 6–7^{(5)}, 6–2 |
| Win | 2–0 | Jul 2009 | ITF Sunchang, South Korea | 10k | Hard | (South Korea) Lee Jin-a | 6–7^{(6)}, 7–5, 3–0 ret. |
| Loss | 2–1 | Apr 2010 | ITF Gimcheon, South Korea | 25k | Clay | (South Korea) Lee Ye-ra | 2–6, 5–7 |
| Loss | 2–2 | May 2010 | ITF Sunchang, South Korea | 10k | Hard | (South Korea) Lee Ye-ra | 5–7, 1–6 |
| Win | 3–2 | May 2010 | ITF Goyang, South Korea | 25k | Hard | (South Korea) Lee Jin-a | 6–4, 6–4 |
| Loss | 3–3 | Oct 2010 | ITF Yeongwol, South Korea | 10k | Hard | (South Korea) Kim Kun-hee | 5–7, 1–2 ret. |
| Loss | 3–4 | Jun 2013 | ITF Gimcheon, South Korea | 15k | Hard | (South Korea) Lee Ye-ra | 7–6^{(5)}, 2–6, 0–6 |
| Win | 4–4 | Aug 2015 | ITF Gimcheon, South Korea | 15k | Hard | (Japan) Kyōka Okamura | 6–0, 6–4 |
| Win | 5–4 | Sep 2016 | ITF Yeongwol, South Korea | 15k | Hard | (China) Zhao Di | 6–2, 6–2 |
| Loss | 5–5 | Sep 2017 | ITF Yeongwol, South Korea | 15k | Hard | (South Korea) Kim Da-bin | 6–7^{(10)}, 6–4, 3–6 |
| Loss | 5–6 | Mar 2018 | ITF Nishitama, Japan | 15k | Hard | (South Korea) Lee So-ra | 3–6, 6–2, 5–7 |

=== Doubles: 53 (39 titles, 14 runner-ups) ===
| Legend W25/35 tournaments W10/15 tournaments | Finals by surface Hard (38–14) Carpet (1–0) |

| Result | W–L | Date | Tournament | Tier | Surface | Partner | Opponents | Score |
|---|---|---|---|---|---|---|---|---|
| Loss | 0–1 | Jun 2009 | ITF Gimcheon, Korea | W15 | Hard | (South Korea) Lee Cho-won | (South Korea) Kim Kun-hee (South Korea) Yu Min-hwa | 1–6, 6–1, [11–13] |
| Loss | 0–2 | Jul 2009 | ITF Sunchang, Korea | W15 | Hard | (South Korea) Lee Cho-won | (South Korea) Kim Kun-hee (South Korea) Yu Min-hwa | 2–6, 2–6 |
| Loss | 0–3 | Oct 2010 | ITF Yeongwol, Korea | W15 | Hard | (South Korea) Kim Kun-hee | (South Korea) Kim Ji-young (South Korea) Kim Jung-eun | 6–3, 5–7, [7–10] |
| Win | 1–3 | Oct 2011 | ITF Seoul, Korea | W25 | Hard | (South Korea) Kang Seo-kyung | (South Korea) Kim Ji-young (South Korea) Yoo Mi | 5–7, 6–1, [10–7] |
| Win | 2–3 | Nov 2012 | ITF Bangkok, Thailand | W15 | Hard | (South Korea) Lee Ye-ra | (Thailand) Napatsakorn Sankaew (Chinese Taipei) Yang Chia-hsien | 6–1, 4–6, [10–7] |
| Loss | 2–4 | Dec 2012 | ITF Bangkok, Thailand | W15 | Hard | (South Korea) Lee Ye-ra | (China) Wang Yafan (China) Wen Xin | 5–7, 5–7 |
| Win | 3–4 | Jun 2013 | ITF Gimcheon, Korea | W15 | Hard | (South Korea) Lee Ye-ra | (South Korea) Jang Su-jeong (Japan) Riko Sawayanagi | 6–3, 6–3 |
| Win | 4–4 | Aug 2014 | ITF Yeongwol, Korea | W15 | Hard | (South Korea) Lee Hye-min | (South Korea) Kang Seo-kyung (South Korea) Hong Seung-yeon | 4–6, 6–4, [11–9] |
| Win | 5–4 | Dec 2014 | ITF Hong Kong | W15 | Hard | (South Korea) Choi Ji-hee | (Japan) Nozomi Fujioka (Japan) Mami Hasegawa | 6–3, 6–2 |
| Win | 6–4 | Mar 2015 | ITF Jiangmen, China | W15 | Hard | (South Korea) Choi Ji-hee | (Chinese Taipei) Lee Pei-chi (China) Li Yihong | 4–6, 6–2, [11–9] |
| Loss | 6–5 | Jun 2015 | Incheon Open, Korea | W25 | Hard | (South Korea) Choi Ji-hee | (Japan) Miyu Kato (Japan) Kotomi Takahata | 6–4, 3–6, [7–10] |
| Win | 7–5 | Jun 2015 | ITF Gwangju, Korea | W15 | Hard | (South Korea) Choi Ji-hee | (South Korea) Hong Seung-yeon (South Korea) Kim Ju-eun | 6–1, 1–6, [10–5] |
| Win | 8–5 | Aug 2015 | ITF Gimcheon, Korea | W15 | Hard | (South Korea) Choi Ji-hee | (South Korea) Jung So-hee (South Korea) Park Sang-hee | 6–3, 6–2 |
| Loss | 8–6 | Aug 2015 | ITF Gimcheon, Korea | W15 | Hard | (South Korea) Han Sung-hee | (South Korea) Hong Seung-yeon (South Korea) Kim So-jung | 4–6, 7–6^{(1)}, [8–10] |
| Win | 9–6 | Dec 2015 | ITF Hong Kong | W15 | Hard | (South Korea) Han Sung-hee | (Finland) Emma Laine (Japan) Yukina Saigo | 3–6, 6–3, [10–8] |
| Win | 10–6 | Sep 2016 | ITF Yeongwol, Korea | W15 | Hard | (South Korea) Yu Min-hwa | (South Korea) Jung So-hee (South Korea) Park Sang-hee | 7–6^{(2)}, 6–2 |
| Win | 11–6 | Dec 2016 | ITF Navi Mumbai, India | W25 | Hard | (South Korea) Choi Ji-hee | (Belarus) Sviatlana Pirazhenka (Russia) Anastasia Pribylova | 7–5, 6–1 |
| Loss | 11–7 | May 2017 | ITF Changwon, Korea | W25 | Hard | (South Korea) Choi Ji-hee | (South Korea) Hong Seung-yeon (South Korea) Kang Seo-kyung | 4–6, 3–6 |
| Loss | 11–8 | May 2017 | Incheon Open, Korea | W25 | Hard | (South Korea) Choi Ji-hee | (United States) Desirae Krawczyk (Mexico) Giuliana Olmos | 3–6, 6–2, [8–10] |
| Win | 12–8 | Sep 2017 | ITF Yeongwol, Korea | W15 | Hard | (Chinese Taipei) Lee Pei-chi | (South Korea) Choi Ji-hee (South Korea) Kang Seo-kyung | 6–2, 6–2 |
| Win | 13–8 | Sep 2017 | ITF Yeongwol, Korea | W15 | Hard | (Chinese Taipei) Lee Pei-chi | (South Korea) Kim Da-bin (South Korea) Lee So-ra | 6–1, 7–5 |
| Win | 14–8 | Sep 2017 | ITF Hua Hin, Thailand | W25 | Hard | (Russia) Anastasia Pivovarova | (Serbia) Natalija Stevanović (Japan) Michika Ozeki | 6–4, 6–2 |
| Win | 15–8 | Mar 2018 | ITF Toyota, Japan | W25 | Carpet (i) | (South Korea) Choi Ji-hee | (Japan) Rika Fujiwara (Hungary) Dalma Gálfi | 6–2, 6–3 |
| Win | 16–8 | Mar 2018 | ITF Nishitama, Japan | W15 | Hard | (South Korea) Lee So-ra | (Japan) Chisa Hosonuma (Japan) Kanako Morisaki | 6–4, 7–5 |
| Win | 17–8 | May 2018 | Incheon Open, Korea | W25 | Hard | (South Korea) Han Na-lae | (Chinese Taipei) Chang Kai-chen (Chinese Taipei) Hsu Ching-wen | 5–0 ret. |
| Win | 18–8 | May 2018 | ITF Changwon, Korea | W25 | Hard | (South Korea) Lee So-ra | (South Korea) Kim Da-bin (South Korea) Yu Min-hwa | 6–1, 6–1 |
| Win | 19–8 | Jul 2018 | ITF Naiman, China | W25 | Hard | (China) Kang Jiaqi | (China) Jiang Xinyu (China) Tang Qianhui | 6–7^{(4)}, 6–4, [10–5] |
| Win | 20–8 | Oct 2018 | ITF Nanning, China | W25 | Hard | (China) Ye Qiuyu | (China) Feng Shuo (China) Guo Hanyu | 6–3, 6–0 |
| Loss | 20–9 | May 2019 | ITF Goyang, Korea | W25 | Hard | (South Korea) Lee So-ra | (Chinese Taipei) Hsu Chieh-yu (South Africa) Chanel Simmonds | 1–6, 3–6 |
| Win | 21–9 | Aug 2019 | ITF Huangshan, China | W25 | Hard | (South Korea) Jang Su-jeong | (Hong Kong) Eudice Chong (China) Ye Qiuyu | 7–5, 6–1 |
| Win | 22–9 | Sep 2019 | ITF Yeongwol, Korea | W15 | Hard | (South Korea) Jeong Su-nam | (Japan) Rina Saigo (Japan) Yukina Saigo | 6–4, 6–3 |
| Win | 23–9 | Sep 2019 | ITF Yeongwol, Korea | W15 | Hard | (South Korea) Hong Seung-yeon | (Thailand) Tamachan Momkoonthod (Thailand) Watsachol Sawatdee | 5–7, 7–6^{(5)}, [11–9] |
| Win | 24–9 | Sep 2023 | ITF Yeongwol, Korea | W15 | Hard | (South Korea) Kim Da-bin | (South Korea) Kim Da-hye (Netherlands) Demi Tran | 6–2, 7–5 |
| Win | 25–9 | Sep 2023 | ITF Yeongwol, Korea | W15 | Hard | (South Korea) Kim Da-bin | (South Korea) Back Da-yeon (South Korea) Jeong Bo-young | 6–2, 6–3 |
| Loss | 25–10 | Jun 2024 | ITF Daegu, Korea | W35 | Hard | (South Korea) Kim Da-bin | (Japan) Ayano Shimizu (Japan) Kisa Yoshioka | 4–6, 3–6 |
| Win | 26–10 | Jun 2024 | ITF Tianjin, China | W15 | Hard | (South Korea) Kim Da-bin | (China) Xun Fangying (China) Yuan Chengyiyi | 6–2, 6–1 |
| Loss | 26–11 | Sep 2024 | ITF Yeongwol, Korea | W15 | Hard | (China) Ye Qiuyu | (South Korea) Back Da-yeon (South Korea) Lee Eun-hye | 1–6, 1–6 |
| Loss | 26–12 | Feb 2025 | ITF Ma'anshan, China | W15 | Hard | (China) Ye Qiuyu | Daria Egorova; Ekaterina Shalimova | 2–6, 5–7 |
| Win | 27–12 | Mar 2025 | ITF Ma'anshan, China | W15 | Hard | (China) Ye Qiuyu | (China) Lu Jingjing (China) Xun Fangying | 6–4, 6–1 |
| Win | 28–12 | Mar 2025 | ITF Nonthaburi, Thailand | W15 | Hard | (Thailand) Punnin Kovapitukted | (Thailand) Patcharin Cheapchandej (Thailand) Kamonwan Yodpetch | 6–4, 6–7^{(5)}, [10–7] |
| Win | 29–12 | Mar 2025 | ITF Nonthaburi | W15 | Hard | (Thailand) Punnin Kovapitukted | (Thailand) Lunda Kumhom (Thailand) Kamonwan Yodpetch | 6–3, 6–0 |
| Win | 30–12 | Apr 2025 | ITF Wuning, China | W15 | Hard | (China) Ye Qiuyu | (Slovakia) Viktória Morvayová (China) Ren Yufei | 6–2, 7–5 |
| Win | 31–12 | Apr 2025 | ITF Wuning, China | W15 | Hard | (China) Ye Qiuyu | (China) Wang Jiaqi (China) Xu Jiayu | 6–2, 6–4 |
| Loss | 31–13 | Apr 2025 | ITF Goyang, Korea | W35 | Hard | (Thailand) Punnin Kovapitukted | (Japan) Saki Imamura (Indonesia) Janice Tjen | 6–4, 0–6, [5–10] |
| Win | 32–13 | Jul 2025 | ITF Ma'anshan, China | W15 | Hard | (South Korea) Im Heerae | (China) Hou Yanan (China) Wang Jiayi | 6–1, 6–1 |
| Win | 33–13 | Jul 2025 | ITF Nakhon Pathom, Thailand | W15 | Hard | (China) Ye Qiuyu | (Japan) Haruna Arakawa (Japan) Natsumi Kawaguchi | 6–3, 6–2 |
| Win | 34–13 | Jul 2025 | ITF Nakhon Pathom | W15 | Hard | (China) Ye Qiuyu | (Thailand) Thasaporn Naklo (Thailand) Bunyawi Thamchaiwat | 6–2, 6–3 |
| Win | 35–13 | Jul 2025 | ITF Nakhon Pathom | W35 | Hard | (China) Ye Qiuyu | (Thailand) Salakthip Ounmuang (Thailand) Kamonwan Yodpetch | 6–4, 4–6, [10–5] |
| Win | 36–13 | Aug 2025 | ITF Nakhon Pathom | W15 | Hard | (China) Ye Qiuyu | (Thailand) Anchisa Chanta (Thailand) Patcharin Cheapchandej | 6–3, 6–0 |
| Loss | 36–14 | Mar 2026 | ITF Ma'anshan, China | W15 | Hard | (China) Ye Qiuyu | (Sweden) Tiana Tian Deng (China) Wang Meiling | 6–2, 5–7, [8–10] |
| Win | 37–14 | May 2026 | ITF Lu'an, China | W15 | Hard | (China) Xu Jiayu | (South Korea) Ahn Yu-jin (China) Aitiyaguli Aixirefu | 2–6, 6–2, [10–6] |
| Win | 38–14 | Aug 2026 | ITF Yeongwol, Korea | W15 | Hard | (South Korea) Jeong Bo-young | (Japan) Chihiro Muramatsu (Japan) Kisa Yoshioka | 6–4, 6–2 |
| Win | 39–14 | Sep 2026 | ITF Yeongwol, Korea | W15 | Hard | (South Korea) Kim Da-bin | (South Korea) Choi Seo-yun (South Korea) Lee Ha-eum | 7–5, 3–6, [10–1] |
