= 2010 Samsung Securities Cup =

Tennis tournament

- Date: 18–24 October
- Edition: 11th
- Surface: Hard
- Location: Seoul, South Korea

Champions

Singles
- (Chinese Taipei) Lu Yen-hsun

Doubles
- (Australia) Rameez Junaid / (Germany) Frank Moser
← 2009 ·	Samsung Securities Cup	· 2011 →

The 2010 Samsung Securities Cup was a professional tennis tournament played on hard courts. It was the eleventh edition of the tournament which was part of the 2010 ATP Challenger Tour. It took place in Seoul, South Korea between 18 and 24 October 2010.

== ATP entrants ==
=== Seeds ===
Country	Player	Rank^{1}	Seed
TPE	Lu Yen-hsun	42	1
RSA	Kevin Anderson	64	2
FRA	Florent Serra	80	3
ISR	Dudi Sela	84	4
IND	Somdev Devvarman	95	5
POR	Frederico Gil	96	6
JPN	Go Soeda	104	7
SVN	Grega Žemlja	129	8

- Rankings are as of October 11, 2010.

=== Other entrants ===
The following players received wildcards into the singles main draw:

- (South Korea) Cho Soong-jae
- (South Korea) Chung Hong
- (Chinese Taipei) Lu Yen-hsun
- (South Korea) Noh Sang-woo

The following players received entry from the qualifying draw:

- (Philippines) Treat Conrad Huey
- (South Korea) Nam Ji-sung
- (Croatia) Ante Pavić
- (South Korea) Daniel Yoo

== Champions ==
=== Singles ===
(Chinese Taipei) Lu Yen-hsun def. (South Africa) Kevin Anderson, 6–3, 6–4

=== Doubles ===
(Australia) Rameez Junaid / (Germany) Frank Moser def. (Canada) Vasek Pospisil / (Canada) Adil Shamasdin, 6–3, 6–4
