= Samsung Securities Cup =

Tournament information
- Event name: Seoul
- Location: Seoul, South Korea
- Surface: Hard
ATP Tour
- Category: ATP Challenger Tour
- Draw: 32S/32Q/16D
- Prize money: $50,000
WTA Tour
- Category: ITF Women's Circuit
- Draw: 32S/32Q/16D
- Prize money: $25,000

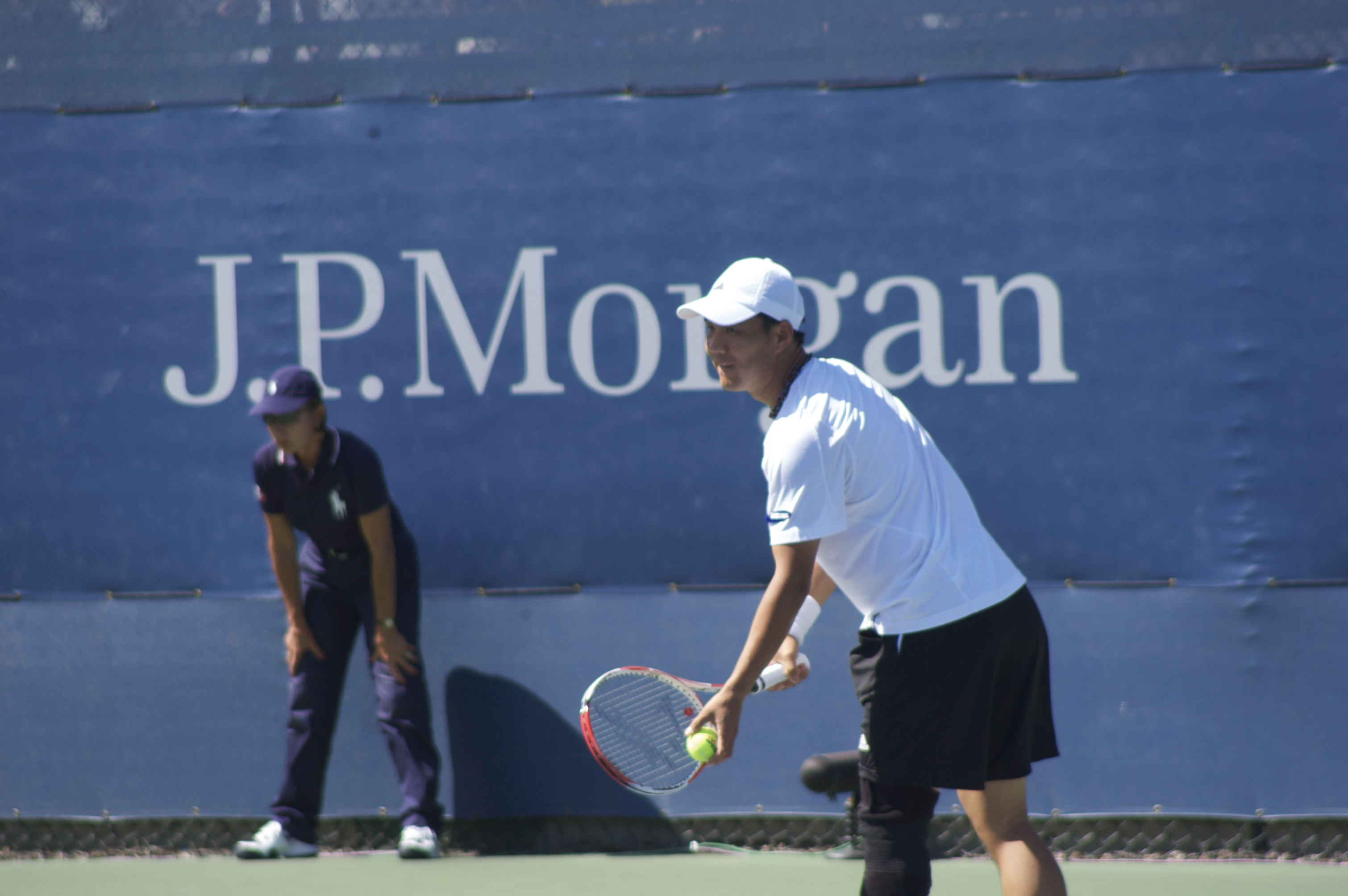
South Korean player Lee Hyung-taik dominated the nine first years of competition at the event, winning seven titles in singles, and one in doubles

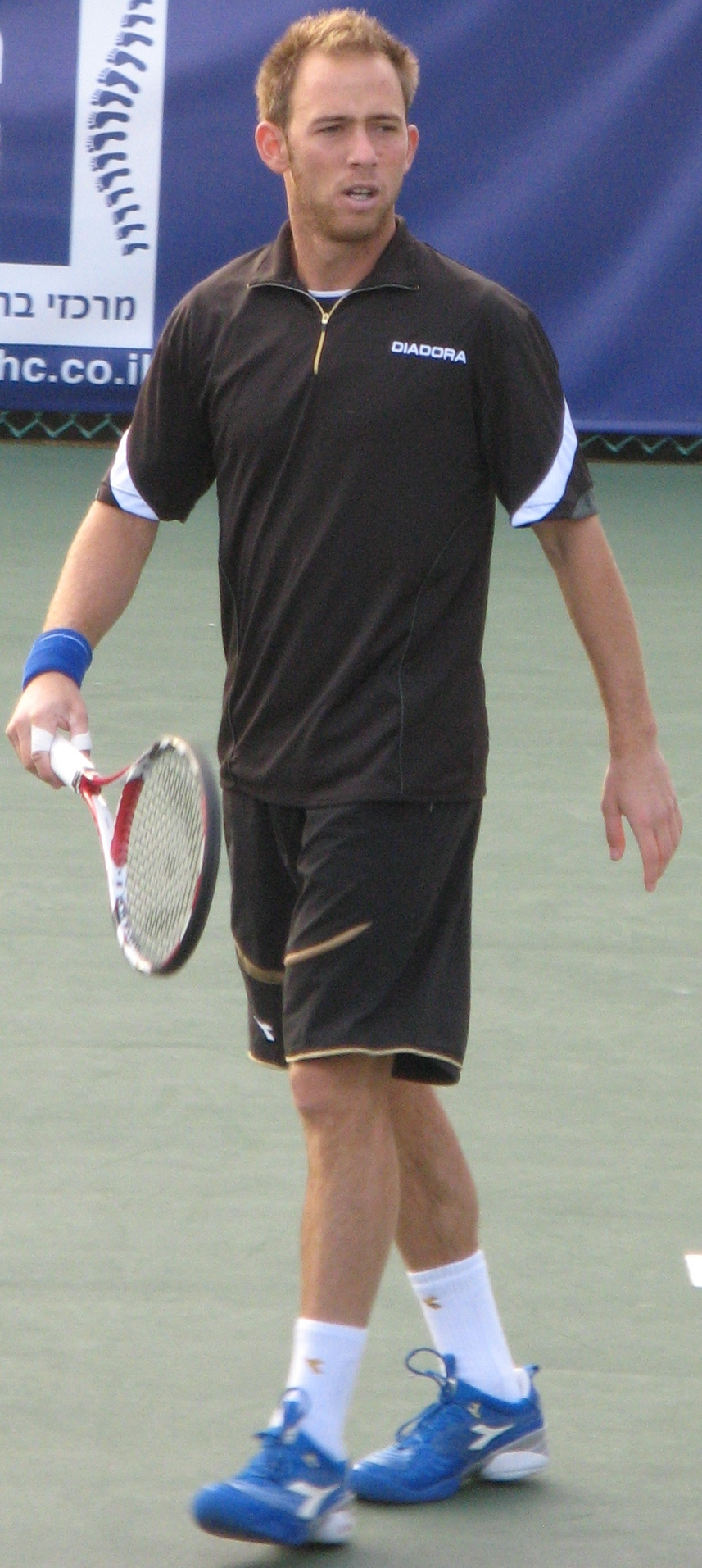
Israeli Dudi Sela, the 2007 champion, is one of only three singles winners other than Lee Hyung-taik

The Samsung Securities Cup was a professional tennis tournament played on outdoor hard courts. It was part of the Association of Tennis Professionals (ATP) Challenger Tour and the ITF Women's Circuit. The men's event was held annually in Seoul, South Korea, from 2000 to 2013, the women's event parallel from 2011 to 2013.

== Past finals ==
=== Men's singles ===
Year	Champion	Runner-up	Score
2013	(Serbia) Dušan Lajović	(Germany) Julian Reister	Walkover
2012	(Chinese Taipei) Lu Yen-hsun	(Japan) Yūichi Sugita	6–3, 7–6^{(7–4)}
2011	(Chinese Taipei) Lu Yen-hsun	(Chinese Taipei) Jimmy Wang	7–5, 6–3
2010	(Chinese Taipei) Lu Yen-hsun	(South Africa) Kevin Anderson	6–3, 6–4
2009	(Slovakia) Lukáš Lacko	(Czech Republic) Dušan Lojda	6–4, 6–2
2008	(South Korea) Lee Hyung-taik	(Czech Republic) Ivo Minář	6–4, 6–0
2007	(Israel) Dudi Sela	(Greece) Konstantinos Economidis	6–4, 6–4
2006	(South Korea) Lee Hyung-taik	(Germany) Björn Phau	6–2, 6–2
2005	(South Korea) Lee Hyung-taik	(France) Nicolas Thomann	4–6, 6–1, 7–6^{(8–6)}
2004	(South Korea) Lee Hyung-taik	(Monaco) Jean-René Lisnard	3–6, 7–5, 6–2
2003	(South Korea) Lee Hyung-taik	(Netherlands) Dennis van Scheppingen	6–3, 6–3
2002	(Austria) Werner Eschauer	(Russia) Igor Kunitsyn	6–2, retired
2001	(South Korea) Lee Hyung-taik	(Japan) Gouichi Motomura	6–3, 6–4
2000	(South Korea) Lee Hyung-taik	(Czech Republic) Radek Štěpánek	6–4, 6–4

=== Women's singles ===
Year	Champion	Runner-up	Score
2013	(South Korea) Han Na-lae	(South Korea) Kim Da-hye	6–4, 6–4
2012	(Japan) Erika Sema	(Japan) Mai Minokoshi	6–1, 7–5
2011	(Chinese Taipei) Hsieh Su-wei	(Japan) Yurika Sema	6–1, 6–0

=== Men's doubles ===
Year	Champions	Runners-up	Score
2013	(Croatia) Marin Draganja (Croatia) Mate Pavić	(Chinese Taipei) Lee Hsin-han (Chinese Taipei) Peng Hsien-yin	7–5, 6–2
2012	(Chinese Taipei) Lee Hsin-han (Chinese Taipei) Peng Hsien-yin	(South Korea) Lim Yong-kyu (South Korea) Nam Ji-sung	7–6^{(7–3)}, 7–5
2011	(Thailand) Sanchai Ratiwatana (Thailand) Sonchat Ratiwatana	(India) Purav Raja (India) Divij Sharan	6–4, 7–6^{(7–3)}
2010	(Australia) Rameez Junaid (Germany) Frank Moser	(Canada) Vasek Pospisil (Canada) Adil Shamasdin	6–3, 6–4
2009	(South Africa) Rik de Voest (Chinese Taipei) Lu Yen-hsun	(Thailand) Sanchai Ratiwatana (Thailand) Sonchat Ratiwatana	7–6^{(7–5)}, 3–6, [10–6]
2008	(Poland) Łukasz Kubot (Austria) Oliver Marach	(Thailand) Sanchai Ratiwatana (Thailand) Sonchat Ratiwatana	7–5, 4–6, [10–6]
2007	(South Africa) Rik de Voest (Chinese Taipei) Lu Yen-hsun	(Thailand) Sanchai Ratiwatana (Thailand) Sonchat Ratiwatana	6–3, 7–5
2006	(Austria) Alexander Peya (Germany) Björn Phau	(Romania) Florin Mergea (Thailand) Danai Udomchoke	6–4, 6–2
2005	(Austria) Alexander Peya (Germany) Björn Phau	(South Africa) Rik de Voest (Poland) Łukasz Kubot	0–6, 6–4, [10–7]
2004	(Australia) Ashley Fisher (Sweden) Robert Lindstedt	(Sweden) Johan Landsberg (Japan) Thomas Shimada	7–5, 7–6^{(7–0)}
2003	(United States) Alex Kim (South Korea) Lee Hyung-taik	(United States) Alex Bogomolov, Jr. (United States) Jeff Salzenstein	1–6, 6–1, 6–4
2002	(Australia) Jaymon Crabb (New Zealand) Mark Nielsen	(Argentina) Federico Browne (Netherlands) Rogier Wassen	Walkover
2001	(Czech Republic) František Čermák (Czech Republic) Jaroslav Levinský	(Switzerland) Yves Allegro (Switzerland) Marco Chiudinelli	5–7, 7–6^{(10–8)}, 6–3
2000	(Australia) Tim Crichton (Australia) Ashley Fisher	(Czech Republic) František Čermák (Czech Republic) Ota Fukárek	6–4, 6–4

=== Women's doubles ===
Year	Champions	Runners-up	Score
2013	(South Korea) Han Na-lae (South Korea) Yoo Mi	(South Korea) Kim Sun-jung (South Korea) Yu Min-hwa	2–6, 6–3, [10–6]
2012	(Uzbekistan) Nigina Abduraimova (Hong Kong) Venise Chan	(South Korea) Kim Ji-young (South Korea) Yoo Mi	6–4, 2–6, [12–10]
2011	(South Korea) Kang Seo-kyung (South Korea) Kim Na-ri	(South Korea) Kim Ji-young (South Korea) Yoo Mi	5–7, 6–1, [10–7]
