= Kim Hae-sung =

South Korean figure skater

Personal information
- Nationality: South Korean
- Born: 12 February 1966 (age 60)

Sport
- Sport: Figure skating

Kim Hae-sung (born 12 February 1966) is a South Korean figure skater. She competed in the ladies' singles event at the 1984 Winter Olympics.

Kim was noted as the only female figure skater to qualify for the 1984 Olympics.
