= Yu Min-hwa =

South Korean tennis player

Yu Min-hwa 유민화
- Country (sports): South Korea
- Born: 25 March 1988 (age 38)
- Plays: Right (two-handed backhand)
- Prize money: $34,067

Singles
- Career record: 96–88
- Career titles: 1 ITF
- Highest ranking: No. 513 (26 July 2010)

Doubles
- Career record: 104–70
- Career titles: 9 ITF
- Highest ranking: No. 338 (21 June 2010)

Team competitions
- Fed Cup: 2–6

- Yu Min-hwa
- Hangul: 유민화
- RR: Yu Minhwa
- MR: Yu Minhwa

Yu Min-hwa (Korean: 유민화; born 25 March 1988) is a South Korean former tennis player.

Yu has career-high WTA rankings of 513 in singles, achieved on 26 July 2010, and 338 in doubles, reached on 21 June 2010. She won one singles title and nine doubles titles on the ITF Women's Circuit.

Yu has represented South Korea in Fed Cup, where she has a win–loss record of 2–6.

== ITF Circuit finals ==
Legend
$50,000 tournaments
$25,000 tournaments
$10,000 tournaments

=== Singles: 1 (title) ===
Result	No.	Date	Tournament	Surface	Opponent	Score
Win	1.	1 June 2008	ITF Bangkok, Thailand	Hard	(South Korea) Kim Sun-jung	6–4, 5–7, 6–1

=== Doubles: 16 (9 titles, 7 runner-ups) ===
Result	No.	Date	Tournament	Surface	Partner	Opponents	Score
Win	1.	5 May 2008	ITF Thiruvananthapuram, India	Clay	(Japan) Miki Miyamura	(Georgia (country)) Magda Okruashvili (India) Poojashree Venkatesha	7–6^{(6)}, 6–2
Win	2.	28 June 2009	ITF Gimcheon, South Korea	Clay	(South Korea) Kim Kun-hee	(South Korea) Kim Na-ri (South Korea) Lee Cho-won	6–1, 1–6, [13–11]
Loss	3.	5 July 2009	ITF Gimcheon	Clay	(South Korea) Kim Kun-hee	(South Korea) Chang Kyung-mi (South Korea) Lee Jin-a	1–6, 2–6
Win	4.	12 July 2009	ITF Sunchang, South Korea	Hard	(South Korea) Kim Kun-hee	(South Korea) Kim Na-ri (South Korea) Lee Cho-won	6–2, 6–2
Loss	5.	2 May 2010	ITF Gimcheon, South Korea	Clay	(South Korea) Kim Kun-hee	(South Korea) Chang Kyung-mi (South Korea) Lee Jin-a	5–7, 3–6
Win	6.	23 May 2010	ITF Sunchang, South Korea	Hard	(South Korea) Kim Kun-hee	(South Korea) Chang Kyung-mi (South Korea) Lee Ye-ra	6–7^{(5)}, 6–4, [10–4]
Win	7.	30 May 2010	ITF Goyang, South Korea	Hard	(South Korea) Kim Kun-hee	(South Korea) Chang Kyung-mi (South Korea) Lee Jin-a	6–4, 6–4
Loss	8.	6 June 2010	ITF Komoro, Japan	Clay	(South Korea) Kim Kun-hee	(Japan) Shuko Aoyama (Japan) Maya Kato	6–2, 2–6, [9–11]
Loss	9.	28 June 2010	ITF Nonthaburi, Thailand	Hard	(South Korea) Kim Kun-hee	(Chinese Taipei) Chen Yi (Thailand) Varatchaya Wongteanchai	2–6, 2–6
Loss	10.	22 May 2011	ITF Goyang, South Korea	Hard	(South Korea) Kim Kun-hee	(South Korea) Kim Ji-young (South Korea) Yoo Mi	4–6, 2–6
Win	11.	2 September 2012	ITF Yeongwol, South Korea	Hard	(South Korea) Kim Sun-jung	(South Korea) Han Na-lae (South Korea) Jang Su-jeong	6–3, 7–5
Win	12.	1 September 2013	ITF Yeongwol	Hard	(South Korea) Kim Sun-jung	(South Korea) Kang Seo-kyung (South Korea) Kim Ji-young	6-1, 7–5
Loss	13.	3 November 2013	ITF Seoul, South Korea	Hard	(South Korea) Kim Sun-jung	(South Korea) Han Na-lae (South Korea) Yoo Mi	6–2, 3–6, [6–10]
Win	14.	10 September 2016	ITF Yeongwol, South Korea	Hard	(South Korea) Kim Na-ri	(South Korea) Jung So-hee (South Korea) Park Sang-hee	7–6^{(2)}, 6–2
Loss	15.	27 May 2018	ITF Changwon, South Korea	Hard	(South Korea) Kim Da-bin	(South Korea) Kim Na-ri (South Korea) Lee So-ra	1–6, 1–6
Win	16.	12 June 2018	ITF Gyeongs, South Korea	Hard	(South Korea) Kim Mi-ok	(South Korea) Jung So-hee (South Korea) Park Sang-hee	6–2, 1–6, [10–5]
