= Venise Chan =

Hong Kong tennis player

- Full name: Wing-Yau Venise Chan
- Country (sports): Hong Kong
- Born: 30 May 1989 (age 37)
- Coach: Jill Hetherington
- Prize money: $38,293

Singles
- Career record: 160–73
- Career titles: 6 ITF
- Highest ranking: No. 340 (15 October 2012)

Doubles
- Career record: 27–44
- Career titles: 2 ITF
- Highest ranking: No. 516 (15 April 2013)

Team competitions
- Fed Cup: 16–6

Venise Chan (Chinese: 陳詠悠; born 30 May 1989) is a tennis and padel player from Hong Kong. Chan, who reached No. 1 in Hong Kong and No. 340 in WTA rankings, also played college tennis for the University of Washington.

== Early life ==
Chan was born in Hong Kong. Chan is fluent in Cantonese, Mandarin, English, and some Japanese.

== Tennis career ==
At age 12 years 318 days, Chan became the youngest female since Paulette Moreno in 1977 to contest a Ladies' Open singles final in Hong Kong when she reached the title decider at the 2002 Hong Kong National Tennis Championships.

She made her debut for the Hong Kong Fed Cup team in 2006, and has a 16–6 record. She won her sixth career pro circuit title at the $10k Sharm El Sheikh in Egypt. In her career, she won six women's singles and two doubles titles on the ITF Women's Circuit.

She is also the youngest player from Hong Kong (16 years and 5 months) to lift a women's singles title and the only one to do so on her pro circuit debut.

Chan represented Hong Kong at the World University Games (2011), Asian Games (2010), All China Games (2009 and 2013), Asian Championships (2007), and Fed Cup (2006-2007 and 2012-2013).

In 2005 and 2011, Chan was nominated for the Hong Kong Sports Stars Awards, an annual Sports Federation & Olympic Committee of Hong Kong, China annual event.

As a junior, she reached a career-high ranking of No. 24 in the world. She competed in all four Junior Grand Slam championships ‒ Australian Open, Roland Garros, Wimbledon, and US Open. She also captured the Hong Kong National Junior Tennis Championships in the under-12, under-14, under-16, and under-18 age groups.

== ITF Circuit finals ==
=== Singles (6–3) ===
Legend $25,000 tournaments $10,000 tournaments	Finals by surface Hard (6–3) Clay (0–0)

Outcome	No.	Date	Tournament	Surface	Opponent	Score
Winner	1.	13 November 2005	ITF Manila, Philippines	Hard	(Philippines) Czarina Arevalo	6–1, 6–4
Runner-up	1.	20 November 2005	ITF Manila, Philippines	Hard	(United States) Riza Zalameda	3–6, 2–6
Winner	2.	23 July 2006	ITF Bangkok, Thailand	Hard	(Indonesia) Ayu-Fani Damayanti	6–4, 6–4
Runner-up	2.	5 October 2006	ITF Jakarta, Indonesia	Hard	(Indonesia) Sandy Gumulya	3–6, 0–6
Runner-up	3.	23 August 2008	ITF Khon Kaen, Thailand	Hard	(China) Lu Jiajing	3–6, 4–6
Winner	3.	11 September 2011	ITF Yeongwol, South Korea	Hard	(China) Yue Yuan	6–2, 6–3
Winner	4.	12 February 2011	ITF Sharm El Sheikh, Egypt	Hard	(Netherlands) Lynn Schonhage	7–5, 1–6, 6–1
Winner	5.	24 June 2012	ITF Sharm El Sheikh, Egypt	Hard	(Russia) Ekaterina Yashina	6–7^{(5)}, 6–3, 6–4
Winner	6.	6 October 2012	ITF Bidar, India	Hard	(Japan) Yumi Miyazaki	6–2, 6–3

=== Doubles (2–0) ===
Legend $25,000 tournaments $10,000 tournaments	Finals by surface Hard (2–0) Clay (0–0)

Outcome	No.	Date	Tournament	Surface	Partner	Opponents	Score
Winner	1.	8 July 2012	ITF Sharm El Sheikh, Egypt	Hard	(Russia) Anna Morgina	(Egypt) Magy Aziz (Egypt) Mora Eshak	6–1, 6–2
Winner	2.	27 October 2012	ITF Seoul, South Korea	Hard	(Uzbekistan) Nigina Abduraimova	(South Korea) Kim Ji-young (South Korea) Yoo Mi	6–4, 2–6, [12–10]
