= Mai Minokoshi =

Japanese tennis player (born 1992)

Mai Minokoshi (美濃越 舞, Minokoshi Mai; born 16 April 1992) is a professional Japanese tennis player. Her career record is 86 wins against 121 losses.

== Biography ==
Minokoshi was born in Funabashi, Chiba Prefecture on 16 April 1992. She commenced playing tennis at seven years of age at a public tennis court near her family home with her parents and older sister. Her father, who is a school teacher, transferred to a night school so that he could coach Minokishi during the day. During her career Minokishi has also been coached by professional coaches including former player Tasuku Iwami.

Minokoshi attended Funabashi Junior High School and Shumei Yachiyo High School. In 2005 Minokoshi was runner-up in the All-Japan Junior Tennis Tournament, and in both 2009 and 2010 she was runner-up in the singles tournament of the national high school tournament. It was her success at the national tournaments which gave her the confidence to turn professional.

After graduating from high school in March 2011, Minokoshi officially turned professional the following month. She soon garnered attention from the Japanese media and signed a contract with entertainment agency Yoshimoto Kogyo in June 2011.

In February 2019 she signed an employment contract with Japanese investment firm Ando Securities, joining the company's stable of female tennis players that includes Kurumi Nara, Ayumi Morita and Yuki Tanaka.

== Career ==
Minokoshi is known for her strong right-handed, one-handed forehand shot. As of March 16, 2020, Minokoshi holds a singles rating of 717, with a career high of 255; and a 448 doubles ranking (including ITF, WTA, and Fed Cup professional level results), with a career high of 334. Her career doubles record is 86 wins to 121 losses, and has a career total winnings of $110,682.

Her career tournament wins include the 2017 Kashiwa International singles and the 2018 ITF Wuhan doubles.
