= Kang Seo-kyung =

South Korean tennis player

- Country (sports): South Korea
- Born: 29 January 1989 (age 36) Daejeon, South Korea
- Plays: Right-handed (two-handed backhand)
- Prize money: $31,828

Singles
- Career record: 113–79
- Career titles: 1 ITF
- Highest ranking: No. 560 (9 September 2013)

Doubles
- Career record: 96–80
- Career titles: 6 ITF
- Highest ranking: No. 465 (26 June 2017)

- Kang Seo-kyung
- Hangul: 강서경
- RR: Gang Seogyeong
- MR: Kang Sŏgyŏng

Kang Seo-kyung is a South Korean former tennis player.

Kang has a career-high singles ranking of 560, achieved on 9 September 2013. She also has a career-high WTA doubles ranking of 484, reached on 31 October 2011.

Kang made her WTA Tour doubles main-draw debut at the 2014 Korea Open partnering Hong Seung-yeon.

== ITF Circuit finals ==
$50,000 tournaments
$25,000 tournaments
$15,000 tournaments
$10,000 tournaments

=== Singles: 2 (1–1) ===
Outcome	No.	Date	Tournament	Surface	Opponent	Score
Winner	1.	18 May 2009	ITF Mumbai, India	Hard	(China) He Chunyan	6–1, 6–0
Runner-up	1.	25 October 2010	ITF Yeongwol, South Korea	Hard	(South Korea) Kim Ji-young	6–7^{(1)}, 3–6

=== Doubles: 15 (6–9) ===
Outcome	No.	Date	Tournament	Surface	Partner	Opponents	Score
Runner-up	1.	2 November 2009	ITF Kuching, Malaysia	Hard	(South Korea) Han Sung-hee	(Indonesia) Lavinia Tananta (Indonesia) Romana Tedjakusuma	2–6, 5–7
Runner-up	2.	25 October 2010	ITF Yeongwol, South Korea	Hard	(South Korea) Lee Hye-min	(South Korea) Ham Mi-rae (South Korea) Jeong Yoon-young	3–6, 6–2, [4–10]
Winner	1.	17 October 2011	ITF Seoul, South Korea	Hard	(South Korea) Kim Na-ri	(South Korea) Kim Ji-young (South Korea) Yoo Mi	5–7, 6–1, [10–7]
Winner	2.	31 March 2013	ITF Nishitama, Japan	Hard	(South Korea) Han Na-lae	(Japan) Makoto Ninomiya (Japan) Eri Hozumi	6–4, 6–7^{(4)}, [10–6]
Winner	3.	23 June 2013	ITF Gimcheon, South Korea	Hard	(South Korea) Kim Ji-young	(South Korea) Jang Su-jeong (Japan) Riko Sawayanagi	7–5, 6–1
Runner-up	3.	25 August 2013	ITF Yeongwol, South Korea	Hard	(South Korea) Kim Ji-young	(South Korea) Kim Sun-jung (South Korea) Yu Min-hwa	1–6, 5–7
Runner-up	4.	16 December 2013	ITF Hong Kong	Hard	(South Korea) Hong Seung-yeon	(South Korea) Choi Ji-hee (Japan) Akari Inoue	6–4, 1–6, [7–10]
Runner-up	5.	25 August 2014	ITF Yeongwol, South Korea	Hard	(South Korea) Hong Seung-yeon	(South Korea) Kim Na-ri (South Korea) Lee Hye-min	6–4, 4–6, [9–11]
Runner-up	6.	27 December 2014	ITF Hong Kong	Hard	(South Korea) Hong Seung-yeon	(China) Yang Zhaoxuan (China) Ye Qiuyu	4–6, 3–6
Runner-up	7.	18 May 2015	ITF Seoul, South Korea	Hard	(South Korea) Hong Seung-yeon	(Chinese Taipei) Chan Chin-wei (Chinese Taipei) Lee Ya-hsuan	2–6, 1–6
Runner-up	8.	15 July 2016	ITF Gimcheon, South Korea	Hard	(South Korea) Hong Seung-yeon	(Indonesia) Jessy Rompies (Japan) Ayano Shimizu	2–6, 5–7
Winner	4.	12 May 2017	ITF Changwon, South Korea	Hard	(South Korea) Hong Seung-yeon	(South Korea) Kim Na-ri (South Korea) Choi Ji-hee	6–4, 6–3
Winner	5.	3 June 2017	ITF Sangju, South Korea	Hard	(South Korea) Choi Ji-hee	(South Korea) Kim Da-bin (South Korea) Lee So-ra	7–6^{(3)}, 6–3
Winner	6.	17 June 2017	ITF Gimcheon, South Korea	Hard	(South Korea) Choi Ji-hee	(South Korea) Kim Da-bin (South Korea) Lee So-ra	6–4, 6–2
Runner-up	9.	3 September 2017	ITF Yeongwol, South Korea	Hard	(South Korea) Choi Ji-hee	(South Korea) Kim Na-ri (Chinese Taipei) Lee Pei-chi	2–6, 2–6
