= Yoo Mi =

South Korean tennis player

- Country (sports): South Korea
- Residence: Daegu
- Born: 9 May 1986 (age 39); Seoul
- Plays: Right-handed (two-handed backhand)
- Prize money: $81,383

Singles
- Career record: 197–116
- Career titles: 6 ITF
- Highest ranking: No. 299 (8 September 2014)

Doubles
- Career record: 177–82
- Career titles: 18 ITF
- Highest ranking: No. 203 (8 September 2014)

Yoo Mi (born 9 May 1986 in Seoul) is a former South Korean tennis player.

She has a career-high singles ranking of world No. 299, and a best doubles ranking of 203, both achieved on 8 September 2014.

Yoo made her WTA Tour debut at the 2009 Hansol Korea Open, where she had been given a wildcard into the singles main draw. She lost in the first round to Meghann Shaughnessy.

Playing in Fed Cup for South Korea, Yoo has a win–loss ratio of 10–10.

== ITF Circuit finals ==
=== Singles: 11 (6 titles, 5 runner-ups) ===
Legend $100,000 tournaments $75,000 tournaments $50,000 tournaments $25,000 tournaments $10,000 tournaments	Finals by surface Hard (6–4) Clay (0–1) Grass (0–0) Carpet (0–0)

Result	No.	Date	Tournament	Surface	Opponent	Score
Loss	1.	16 November 2003	ITF Manila, Philippines	Clay	(Indonesia) Septi Mende	4–6, 0–6
Loss	2.	19 June 2005	ITF Incheon, South Korea	Hard	(Chinese Taipei) Hsieh Su-wei	1–6, 2–6
Win	1.	17 July 2005	ITF Seogwipo, South Korea	Hard	(South Korea) Kim Mi-ok	6–2, 6–3
Win	2.	28 May 2006	ITF Seogwipo	Hard	(South Korea) Lee Jin-a	7–5, 6–2
Loss	3.	31 August 2009	ITF Nonthaburi, Thailand	Hard	(Russia) Angelina Gabueva	4–6, 3–6
Loss	4.	9 November 2009	ITF Manila, Philippines	Hard	(South Korea) Lee Ye-ra	6–4, 6–6 ret.
Win	3.	5 June 2011	ITF Gimcheon, South Korea	Hard	(Japan) Yurika Sema	6–3, 3–6, 6–1
Win	4.	4 September 2011	ITF Yeongwol, South Korea	Hard	(Chinese Taipei) Lee Hua-chen	6–1, 6–3
Win	5.	25 March 2013	ITF Nishitama, Japan	Hard	(South Korea) Lee Jin-a	1–6, 6–1, 6–2
Loss	5.	17 June 2013	ITF Gimcheon, South Korea	Hard	(South Korea) Lee Ye-ra	2–6, 6–2, 4–6
Win	6.	21 July 2014	ITF Phuket, Thailand	Hard (i)	(Slovakia) Zuzana Zlochová	6–4, 6–2

=== Doubles: 35 (18 titles, 17 runner-ups) ===
Legend $100,000 tournaments $75,000 tournaments $50,000 tournaments $25,000 tournaments $15,000 tournaments $10,000 tournaments	Finals by surface Hard (16–16) Clay (2–0) Grass (0–0) Carpet (0–1)

Outcome	No.	Date	Tournament	Surface	Partner	Opponents	Score
Runner-up	1.	13 December 2004	ITF Jakarta, Indonesia	Hard	(Russia) Julia Efremova	(Indonesia) Ayu Fani Damayanti (Indonesia) Septi Mende	6–4, 0–6, 5–7
Winner	1.	19 December 2004	ITF Jakarta	Hard	(Russia) Julia Efremova	(South Korea) Chang Kyung-mi (South Korea) Lee Ye-ra	6–3, 6–3
Winner	2.	17 July 2005	ITF Seogwipo, South Korea	Hard	(South Korea) Chae Kyung-yee	(South Korea) Chang Kyung-mi (South Korea) Kim Mi-ok	6–2, 6–1
Winner	3.	21 May 2006	ITF Daegu, South Korea	Hard	(South Korea) Lee Jin-a	(South Korea) Chang Kyung-mi (South Korea) Kim Mi-ok	4–6, 6–4, 6–2
Winner	4.	28 May 2006	ITF Seogwipo, South Korea	Hard	(South Korea) Lee Jin-a	(South Korea) Cho Jeong-a (South Korea) Kim Ji-young	6–3, 6–2
Runner-up	2.	18 June 2006	ITF Incheon, South Korea	Hard	(South Korea) Lee Jin-a	(Chinese Taipei) Chuang Chia-jung (Thailand) Napaporn Tongsalee	2–6, 4–6
Runner-up	3.	5 May 2007	ITF Incheon	Hard	(South Korea) Lee Jin-a	(United States) Tetiana Luzhanska (Indonesia) Romana Tedjakusuma	1–6, 4–6
Runner-up	4.	30 May 2007	ITF Gunma, Japan	Carpet	(Chinese Taipei) Chen Yi	(Japan) Kumiko Iijima (Japan) Akiko Yonemura	4–6, 4–6
Runner-up	5.	14 June 2009	ITF Bangkok, Thailand	Hard	(Japan) Tomoko Dokei	(Thailand) Varatchaya Wongteanchai (Thailand) Suchanun Viratprasert	3–6, 1–6
Runner-up	6.	26 June 2009	ITF Bangkok	Hard	(Japan) Tomoko Dokei	(Thailand) Varatchaya Wongteanchai (Thailand) Suchanun Viratprasert	w/o
Runner-up	7.	17 August 2009	ITF Nonthaburi, Thailand	Hard	(Japan) Tomoko Dokei	(Indonesia) Jessy Rompies (Hong Kong) Zhang Ling	2–6, 6–1, [8–10]
Runner-up	8.	9 November 2009	ITF Manila, Philippines	Hard	(South Korea) Han Na-lae	(South Korea) Kim Sun-jung (South Korea) Lee Ye-ra	4–6, 6–4, [6–10]
Winner	5.	9 November 2009	ITF Manila	Hard	(South Korea) Han Na-lae	(Philippines) Czarina Arevalo (Germany) Katharina Lehnert	6–0, 6–3
Runner-up	9.	13 June 2010	ITF Tokyo, Japan	Hard	(South Korea) Chang Kyung-mi	(Japan) Shuko Aoyama (Japan) Akari Inoue	6–7^{(3)}, 0–6
Winner	6.	22 May 2011	ITF Goyang, South Korea	Hard	(South Korea) Kim Ji-young	(South Korea) Kim Kun-hee (South Korea) Yu Min-hwa	6–4, 6–2
Runner-up	10.	4 June 2011	ITF Gimcheon, South Korea	Hard	(South Korea) Kim Ji-young	(Japan) Remi Tezuka (Chinese Taipei) Chan Hao-ching	5–7, 4–6
Winner	7.	4 September 2011	ITF Yeongwol, South Korea	Hard	(South Korea) Kim Ji-young	(South Korea) Kim Hae-sung (South Korea) Kim Ju-eun	6–2, 6–4
Runner-up	11.	23 October 2011	ITF Seoul, South Korea	Hard	(South Korea) Kim Ji-young	(South Korea) Kang Seo-kyung (South Korea) Kim Na-ri	7–5, 1–6, [7–10]
Runner-up	12.	25 June 2012	ITF Incheon, South Korea	Hard	(South Korea) Kim Ji-young	(China) Sun Shengnan (China) Liang Chen	3–6, 2–6
Winner	8.	9 September 2012	ITF Yeongwol, South Korea	Hard	(South Korea) Kim Ji-young	(China) Zhang Nannan (China) Zhang Yuxuan	7–5, 6–4
Runner-up	13.	28 October 2012	ITF Seoul, South Korea	Hard	(South Korea) Kim Ji-young	(Hong Kong) Venise Chan (Uzbekistan) Nigina Abduraimova	4–6, 6–2, [10–12]
Winner	9.	14 January 2013	ITF Antalya, Turkey	Clay	(South Korea) Lee Jin-a	(Belgium) Elyne Boeykens (Netherlands) Kelly Versteeg	6–3, 6–4
Winner	10.	21 January 2013	ITF Antalya	Clay	(South Korea) Lee Jin-a	(Serbia) Natalija Kostić (Italy) Gaia Sanesi	6–3, 6–1
Runner-up	14.	20 May 2013	ITF Goyang, South Korea	Hard	(South Korea) Han Na-lae	(Japan) Nao Hibino (Japan) Akiko Omae	4–6, 4–6
Winner	11.	24 June 2013	ITF Gimcheon, South Korea	Hard	(South Korea) Han Na-lae	(South Korea) Kim Yun-hee (South Korea) Yoo Jin	6–3, 6–3
Winner	12.	28 October 2013	ITF Seoul, South Korea	Hard	(South Korea) Han Na-lae	(South Korea) Kim Sun-jung (South Korea) Yu Min-hwa	2–6, 6–3, [10–6]
Winner	13.	10 March 2014	ITF Shenzhen, China	Hard	(South Korea) Han Na-lae	(Russia) Natela Dzalamidze (Russia) Polina Leykina	6–1, 6–1
Runner-up	15.	28 April 2014	ITF Seoul, South Korea	Hard	(South Korea) Han Na-lae	(China) Liu Chang (China) Tian Ran	4–6, 7–6^{(5)}, [6–10]
Winner	14.	5 May 2014	ITF Incheon, South Korea	Hard	(South Korea) Han Na-lae	(Thailand) Noppawan Lertcheewakarn (Turkey) Melis Sezer	6–1, 6–1
Runner-up	16.	30 June 2014	ITF Gimcheon, South Korea	Hard	(South Korea) Han Na-lae	(Japan) Makoto Ninomiya (South Korea) Choi Ji-hee	3–6, 6–7^{(6)}
Winner	15.	14 July 2014	ITF Phuket, Thailand	Hard (i)	(South Korea) Han Na-lae	(Japan) Akari Inoue (Chinese Taipei) Lee Ya-hsuan	6–4, 6–3
Runner-up	17.	21 July 2014	ITF Phuket	Hard (i)	(South Korea) Han Na-lae	(Thailand) Nicha Lertpitaksinchai (Thailand) Peangtarn Plipuech	3–6, 7–6^{(5)}, [9–11]
Winner	16.	31 May 2015	ITF Changwon, South Korea	Hard	(South Korea) Han Na-lae	(Japan) Mana Ayukawa (Japan) Makoto Ninomiya	6–3, 6–1
Winner	17.	31 May 2015	ITF Goyang, South Korea	Hard	(South Korea) Han Na-lae	(China) Liu Chang (China) Lu Jiajing	6–1, 7–5
Winner	18.	9 April 2016	ITF Changwon, South Korea	Hard	(South Korea) Han Na-lae	(China) Lu Jiajing (Belgium) Elise Mertens	4–6, 6–3, [10–7]
