= Anastasija Sevastova career statistics =

Career finals
Discipline	Type	Won	Lost	Total
Singles	Grand Slam	–	–	0
Singles	WTA Finals	–	–	0
Singles	WTA Elite (Note: Formerly known as WTA Tournament of Champions until 2015.)	–	–	0
Singles	WTA 1000	–	1	1
Singles	WTA 500	–	–	0
Singles	WTA 250	4	3	0
Singles	Total	4	4	8
Doubles	Grand Slam	–	–	0
Doubles	WTA Finals	–	–	0
Doubles	WTA Elite	–	–	0
Doubles	WTA 1000	–	–	0
Doubles	WTA 500	–	1	1
Doubles	WTA 250	–	–	0
Doubles	Total	0	1	1

This is a list of the main career statistics of the professional Latvian tennis player Anastasija Sevastova.

== Performance timelines ==
Key
W	F	SF	QF	#R	RR	Q#	P#	DNQ	A	Z#	PO	G	S	B	NMS	NTI	P	NH

(W) winner; (F) finalist; (SF) semifinalist; (QF) quarterfinalist; (#R) rounds 4, 3, 2, 1; (RR) round-robin stage; (Q#) qualification round; (P#) preliminary round; (DNQ) did not qualify; (A) absent; (Z#) Davis/Fed Cup Zonal Group (with number indication) or (PO) play-off; (G) gold, (S) silver or (B) bronze Olympic/Paralympic medal; (NMS) not a Masters tournament; (NTI) not a Tier I tournament; (P) postponed; (NH) not held; (SR) strike rate (events won / competed); (W–L) win–loss record.
To avoid confusion and double counting, these charts are updated at the conclusion of a tournament or when the player's participation has ended.

Only main-draw results in WTA Tour, Grand Slam tournaments, Billie Jean King Cup, United Cup, Hopman Cup and Olympic Games are included in win–loss records.

=== Singles ===
Tournament	2007	2008	2009	2010	2011	2012	2013	2014	2015	2016	2017	2018	2019	2020	2021	2022	2023	2024	2025	SR	W–L	Win %
Grand Slam tournaments
Australian Open	A	A	Q1	1R	4R	A	Q1	RT	A	2R	3R	2R	4R	1R	1R	1R	A	A	A	0 / 9	10–9	53%
French Open	A	A	1R	1R	1R	A	Retired		A	2R	3R	1R	4R	A	1R	A	A	A	A	0 / 8	6–8	43%
Wimbledon	A	Q1	1R	1R	1R	A	Retired		A	1R	2R	1R	2R	NH	3R	A	A	A	1R	0 / 9	4–9	31%
US Open	A	A	2R	2R	1R	Q3	Retired		Q1	QF	QF	SF	3R	2R	1R	A	A	A	1R	0 / 10	18–10	64%
Win–Loss	0–0	0–0	1–3	1–4	3–4	0–0	0–0	0–0	0–0	6–4	9–4	6–4	9–4	1–2	2–4	0–1	0–0	0–0	0–2	0 / 36	38–36	51%
Year-end championships
WTA Elite Trophy	Did Not Qualify										SF	RR	Alt	Not Held			DNQ	Not Held		0 / 2	3–2	60%
WTA 1000 + former^{†} tournaments
Qatar Open	NTI	A	Not Held		NTI	A	A	RT	NTI	1R	NTI	3R	NTI	1R	NTI	A	NTI	A	A	0 / 3	2–3	53%
Dubai Championships	Not Tier I		A	2R	2R	Not Tier I			A	NTI	SF	NTI	1R	NTI	3R	NTI	A	A	A	0 / 5	7–5	53%
Indian Wells Open	A	A	A	3R	2R	A	Q1	RT	A	Q2	2R	4R	3R	NH	2R	A	A	A	A	0 / 6	7–6	54%
Miami Open	A	A	A	Q2	A	A	Q1	RT	A	Q1	2R	3R	3R	NH	QF	A	A	A	A	0 / 4	5–4	56%
Madrid Open	Not Held		A	A	A	A	Retired		A	A	SF	2R	3R	NH	3R	A	A	A	3R	0 / 5	11–5	69%
Italian Open	A	A	A	A	A	A	Retired		A	A	2R	3R	1R	1R	2R	A	A	A	1R	0 / 6	4–6	40%
Canadian Open	A	A	A	A	Q1	A	Retired		A	A	2R	QF	1R	NH	1R	A	A	A	4R	0 / 5	7–5	58%
Cincinnati Open	Not Tier I		A	A	Q2	A	Retired		A	Q1	3R	1R	1R	1R	Q1	A	A	A	2R	0 / 5	3–5	38%
Wuhan Open	Not Held							RT	A	1R	1R	1R	1R	Not Held				A	A	0 / 4	0–4	0%
China Open	Not Tier I		A	QF	A	A	Retired		A	1R	1R	F	1R	Not Held			A	A	2R	0 / 6	8–6	57%
Pan Pacific Open^{†}	A	A	Q2	Q1	1R	A	RT	Not Tier I						Not Held		Not Tier I				0 / 1	0–1	0%
Career statistics
	2007	2008	2009	2010	2011	2012	2013	2014	2015	2016	2017	2018	2019	2020	2021	2022	2023	2024	2025	SR	W–L	Win %
Tournaments	1	0	9	16	18	1	2	0	3	20	25	23	22	9	18	2	0	2	1	Career total: 174		
Titles	0	0	0	1	0	0	0	0	0	0	1	1	1	0	0	0	0	0	0	Career total: 4		
Finals	0	0	0	1	0	0	0	0	0	2	1	3	1	0	0	0	0	0	0	Career total: 8		
Hard win–loss	0–0	0–0	4–4	10–8	12–13	0–0	2–2	0–0	2–1	9–11	16–15	25–14	12–13	2–8	10–12	1–2	0–0	4–2	0–0	0 / 104	109–105	51%
Clay win–loss	1–1	0–0	1–3	11–6	0–3	0–1	0–0	0–0	3–2	8–6	15–7	13–4	13–7	0–2	4–4	0–0	0–0	0–0	2–1	3 / 52	71–47	60%
Grass win–loss	0–0	0–0	0–2	0–1	0–2	0–0	0–0	0–0	0–0	4–3	6–2	5–3	4–2	0–0	4–2	0–0	0–0	0–0	0–0	1 / 18	23–17	58%
Overall win–loss	1–1	0–0	5–9	21–15	12–18	0–1	2–2	0–0	5–3	21–20	37–24	43–21	29–22	2–10	18–18	1–2	0–0	4–2	2–1	4 / 174	203–169	55%
Win %	50%	–	36%	58%	40%	0%	50%	–	63%	51%	61%	67%	57%	17%	50%	33%	–	67%	67%	Career total: 55%		
Year-end ranking	267	194	83	45	94	181	–	–	110	35	16	12	27	54	70	677	–	372	208	$8,230,671		

== WTA 1000 tournaments ==
=== Singles: 1 (runner-up) ===
Result	Year	Tournament	Surface	Opponent	Score
Loss	2018	China Open	Hard	(Denmark) Caroline Wozniacki	3–6, 3–6

== WTA Tour finals ==
=== Singles: 8 (4 titles, 4 runner-ups) ===
Legend Premier M (0–1) International (4–3)	Finals by surface Hard (0–1) Grass (1–2) Clay (3–1)

Result	W–L	Date	Tournament	Tier	Surface	Opponent	Score
Win	1–0	May 2010	Estoril Open, Portugal	International	Clay	(Spain) Arantxa Parra Santonja	6–2, 7–5
Loss	1–1	Jun 2016	Mallorca Open, Spain	International	Grass	(France) Caroline Garcia	3–6, 4–6
Loss	1–2	Jul 2016	Bucharest Open, Romania	International	Clay	(Romania) Simona Halep	0–6, 0–6
Win	2–2	Jun 2017	Mallorca Open, Spain	International	Grass	(Germany) Julia Görges	6–4, 3–6, 6–3
Loss	2–3	Jun 2018	Mallorca Open, Spain	International	Grass	(Germany) Tatjana Maria	4–6, 5–7
Win	3–3	Jul 2018	Bucharest Open, Romania	International	Clay	(Croatia) Petra Martić	7–6^{(7–4)}, 6–2
Loss	3–4	Oct 2018	China Open, China	Premier M	Hard	(Denmark) Caroline Wozniacki	3–6, 3–6
Win	4–4	Jul 2019	Baltic Open, Latvia	International	Clay	(Poland) Katarzyna Kawa	3–6, 7–5, 6–4

=== Doubles: 1 (runner-up) ===
Legend International (0–1)	Finals by surface Grass (0–1)

Result	Date	Tournament	Tier	Surface	Partner	Opponents	Score
Loss	Jun 2017	Mallorca Open, Spain	International	Grass	(Serbia) Jelena Janković	(Chinese Taipei) Chan Yung-jan (Switzerland) Martina Hingis	w/o

== ITF Circuit finals ==
=== Singles: 23 (13 titles, 10 runner-ups) ===
Legend
100K tournaments (1–1)
75K tournaments (0–1)
50K tournaments (1–2)
25K tournaments (7–5)
10K tournaments (4–1)

Result	W–L	Date	Tournament	Tier	Surface	Opponent	Score
Loss	0–1	Jul 2006	ITF Garching, Germany	10K	Clay	(Bosnia and Herzegovina) Sandra Martinović	7–6^{(7–5)}, 3–6, 2–6
Win	1–1	Aug 2006	ITF Bad Saulgau, Germany	10K	Clay	(Croatia) Josipa Bek	6–1, 6–0
Win	2–1	Aug 2006	ITF Bratislava, Slovakia	10K	Clay	(Slovakia) Klaudia Malenovská	4–6, 6–0, 6–3
Loss	2–2	May 2007	ITF Antalya, Turkey	25K	Hard	(Serbia) Vojislava Lukić	3–6, 6–7^{(3–7)}
Loss	2–3	Jun 2007	ITF Fontanafredda, Italy	25K	Clay	(Poland) Anna Korzeniak	5–7, 0–6
Win	3–3	Mar 2008	ITF Noida, India	25K	Hard	(United States) Sunitha Rao	6–2, 6–1
Win	4–3	Jun 2008	ITF Galatina, Italy	25K	Clay	(Spain) Estrella Cabeza Candela	6–4, 6–4
Win	5–3	Jul 2008	ITF Les Contamines, France	25K	Hard	(Argentina) Agustina Lepore	6–4, 3–6, 6–3
Loss	5–4	Aug 2008	ITF Katowice, Poland	25K	Clay	(Slovakia) Lenka Wienerová	3–6, 2–6
Loss	5–5	Sep 2008	ITF Brno, Czech Republic	25K	Clay	(Czech Republic) Zuzana Ondrášková	4–6, 6–3, 2–6
Win	6–5	Mar 2009	ITF La Palma, Spain	25K	Hard	(Slovakia) Kristína Kučová	4–6, 6–1, 6–1
Win	7–5	May 2009	Soweto Open, South Africa	100K	Hard	(Czech Republic) Eva Hrdinová	6–2, 6–2
Loss	7–6	Jul 2009	Zagreb Ladies Open, Croatia	75K	Clay	(Czech Republic) Sandra Záhlavová	1–6, 6–7^{(4–7)}
Loss	7–7	Jul 2012	Versmold Open, Germany	50K	Clay	(Germany) Annika Beck	3–6, 1–6
Win	8–7	Jul 2012	ITF Zwevegem, Belgium	25K	Hard (i)	(Turkey) Çağla Büyükakçay	6–0, 6–3
Win	9–7	Jul 2012	Empire Slovak Open, Slovakia	50K	Clay	(Croatia) Ana Savić	w/o
Win	10–7	Feb 2015	ITF Sharm El Sheikh, Egypt	10K	Hard	(Japan) Yuuki Tanaka	7–5, 6–3
Win	11–7	Feb 2015	Trnava Indoor, Slovakia	10K	Hard (i)	(Hungary) Réka Luca Jani	6–1, 7–6^{(7–3)}
Win	12–7	Apr 2015	ITF Ahmedabad, India	25K	Hard	(India) Ankita Raina	6–4, 7–6^{(7–5)}
Win	13–7	May 2015	Wiesbaden Open, Germany	25K	Clay	(Czech Republic) Tereza Martincová	6–1, 6–3
Loss	13–8	May 2015	ITF La Marsa, Tunisia	25K	Clay	(Switzerland) Romina Oprandi	3–6, 3–6
Loss	13–9	Jul 2015	Bursa Cup, Turkey	50K	Clay	(Turkey) İpek Soylu	5–7, 6–3, 1–6
Loss	13–10	May 2016	Empire Slovak Open, Slovakia	100K	Clay	(Czech Republic) Kateřina Siniaková	6–7^{(4–7)}, 7–5, 0–6

=== Doubles: 5 (4 titles, 1 runner-up) ===
Legend
100K tournaments (0–1)
50K tournaments (1–0)
25K tournaments (1–0)
10K tournaments (2–0)

Result	W–L	Date	Tournament	Tier	Surface	Partner	Opponents	Score
Win	1–0	Aug 2008	ITF Katowice, Poland	25K	Clay	(Slovakia) Lenka Wienerová	(Poland) Karolina Kosińska (Poland) Aleksandra Rosolska	5–7, 6–3, [10–3]
Loss	1–1	May 2009	Soweto Open, South Africa	100K	Hard	(Slovakia) Kristína Kučová	(United Kingdom) Naomi Cavaday (Ukraine) Lesia Tsurenko	2–6, 6–2, [9–11]
Win	2–1	Jan 2015	ITF Sharm El Sheikh, Egypt	10K	Hard	(Austria) Melanie Klaffner	(Norway) Caroline Rohde-Moe (Japan) Midori Yamamoto	6–4, 6–4
Win	3–1	Feb 2015	Trnava Indoor, Slovakia	10K	Hard (i)	(Austria) Anna Maria Heil	(Slovakia) Michaela Hončová (Slovakia) Lenka Juríková	6–4, 6–3
Win	4–1	Sep 2015	Open de Saint-Malo, France	50K	Clay	(Slovakia) Kristína Kučová	(Russia) Maria Marfutina (Russia) Natalia Vikhlyantseva	6–7^{(1)}, 6–3, [10–5]

== WTA Tour career earnings ==
Current as of 15 November 2021

Year	Grand Slam singles titles	WTA singles titles	Total singles titles	Earnings ($)	Money list rank
2015	0	0	0	68,147	212
2016	0	0	0	770,893	42
2017	0	1	1	1,694,614	18
2018	0	1	1	2,765,414	12
2019	0	1	1	1,222,432	32
2020	0	0	0	255,739	103
2021	0	0	0	613,507	56
Career	0	4	4	8,148,621	71

- Title counts include singles, doubles and mixed doubles titles.

== Career Grand Slam statistics ==
=== Seedings ===
The tournaments won by Sevastova are in boldface, and advanced into finals by Sevastova are in italics.

Year	Australian Open	French Open	Wimbledon	US Open
2008	A	A	DNQ	A
2009	DNQ	Q	Q	–
2010	–	–	–	–
2011	–	–	–	–
2012	A	A	A	DNQ
2013	DNQ	RT		
2014	RT			
2015	A	A	A	DNQ
2016	Q	–	–	–
2017	32nd	17th	18th	16th
2018	14th	20th	21st	19th
2019	13th	12th	12th	12th
2020	31st	A	NH	31st
2021	–	–	–	–

- Key: (A) absent; (Q) qualifier; (DNQ) did not qualify; (RT) retired; (NH) Not Held; (–) unseeded; (LL) lucky looser.

=== Best Grand Slam results details ===
Grand Slam winners are in boldface, and runner–ups are in italics.

**Australian Open**
**2011 Australian Open (not seeded)**
Round	Opponent	Rank	Score
1R	(Slovenia) Polona Hercog	47	6–4, 7–6^{(7–5)}
2R	(Belgium) Yanina Wickmayer (21)	24	6–4, 6–2
3R	(Serbia) Vesna Dolonc (Q)	146	6–1, 6–3
4R	(Denmark) Caroline Wozniacki (1)	**1**	3–6, 4–6
**2019 Australian Open (13th)**
Round	Opponent	Rank	Score
1R	(Germany) Mona Barthel	76	6–3, 6–1
2R	(Canada) Bianca Andreescu (Q)	106	6–3, 3–6, 6–2
3R	(China) Wang Qiang (21)	21	6–3, 6–3
4R	**(Japan) Naomi Osaka (4)**	4	6–4, 3–6, 4–6

**Wimbledon Championships**
**2021 Wimbledon Championships (unseeded)**
Round	Opponent	Rank	Score
1R	(Kazakhstan) Zarina Diyas	101	6–4, 6–1
2R	(Ukraine) Marta Kostyuk	70	1–6, 6–4, 6–3
3R	(Czech Republic) Barbora Krejčíková (14)	17	6–7^{(1)}, 6–3, 5–7

**French Open**
**2019 French Open (12th)**
Round	Opponent	Rank	Score
1R	(Thailand) Luksika Kumkhum	107	6–1, 6–4
2R	(Luxembourg) Mandy Minella	100	6–2, 6–4
3R	(Belgium) Elise Mertens (20)	20	6–7^{(3–7)}, 6–4, 11–9
4R	(Czech Republic) Markéta Vondroušová	38	2–6, 0–6

**US Open**
**2018 US Open (19th)**
Round	Opponent	Rank	Score
1R	(Croatia) Donna Vekić	41	6–2, 2–6, 6–3
2R	(United States) Claire Liu (W)	158	6–3, 6–1
3R	(Russia) Ekaterina Makarova	45	4–6, 6–1, 6–2
4R	(Ukraine) Elina Svitolina (7)	7	6–3, 1–6, 6–0
QF	(United States) Sloane Stephens (3)	3	6–2, 6–3
SF	(United States) Serena Williams (17)	26	3–6, 0–6

== Wins against top 10 players ==
- Sevastova has an 11–30 (27%) record against players who were, at the time the match was played, ranked in the top 10.

	Player	Rk	Event	Surface	Rd	Score	Rk	Years	Ref
1.	(Serbia) Jelena Janković	9	Monterrey Open, Mexico	Hard	1R	5–7, 6–4, 6–4	72	2010	
2.	(Australia) Samantha Stosur	8	China Open, China	Hard	1R	2–6, 7–6^{(7–5)}, 7–5	55	2010	
3.	(Spain) Garbiñe Muguruza	3	US Open, United States	Hard	2R	7–5, 6–4	48	2016	
4.	(United Kingdom) Johanna Konta	7	Stuttgart Open, Germany	Clay (i)	2R	6–3, 7–5	26	2017	
5.	(Czech Republic) Karolína Plíšková	3	Madrid Open, Spain	Clay	2R	6–3, 6–3	22	2017	
6.	(Germany) Julia Görges	10	Canadian Open, Canada	Hard	3R	6–3, 7–6^{(7–2)}	19	2018	
7.	(Ukraine) Elina Svitolina	7	US Open, United States	Hard	4R	6–3, 1–6, 6–0	18	2018	
8.	(United States) Sloane Stephens	3	US Open, United States	Hard	QF	6–2, 6–3	18	2018	
9.	(Japan) Naomi Osaka	6	China Open, China	Hard	SF	6–4, 6–4	20	2018	
10.	(United States) Serena Williams	9	Fed Cup, United States	Hard (i)	QR	7–6^{(7–5)}, 3–6, 7–6^{(7–4)}	41	2020	
11.	(United States) Jessica Pegula	4	Canadian Open, Canada	Hard	3R	3–6, 6–4, 6–1	386	2025	

- Key: (Rk) first use, opponent rank; (Rd) round; (Rk) 2nd use, player rank; (Ref) reference; (F) final; (SF) semifinal; (QF) quarterfinal; (#R) rounds 4, 3, 2, 1; (RR) round-robin stage; (Q#) qualifying rounds or stages (3), 2, 1.
