= 2024 Fifth Third Charleston 125 – Singles =

Singles
- 2024 Fifth Third Charleston 125

Final
- Champion: (Italy) Elisabetta Cocciaretto
- Runner-up: Diana Shnaider
- Score: 6–3, 6–2

Events
Singles	Doubles
← 2021 ·	LTP Charleston Pro Tennis	· 2024 →

Varvara Lepchenko was the reigning champion from when the event was last held in 2021, but did not participate this year.

Elisabetta Cocciaretto won the title, defeating Diana Shnaider in the final, 6–3, 6–2.

== Seeds ==
1. (France) Clara Burel (withdrew)
2. (Netherlands) Arantxa Rus (first round)
3. (Italy) Martina Trevisan (second round)
4. (Italy) Elisabetta Cocciaretto (champion)
5. (China) Zhu Lin (first round)
6. (China) Wang Yafan (semifinals)
7. Diana Shnaider (final)
8. (Germany) Tamara Korpatsch (first round)
9. (Japan) Nao Hibino (second round)

== Draw ==
=== Key ===
- Q = Qualifier
- WC = Wild card
- LL = Lucky loser
- Alt = Alternate
- SE = Special exempt
- PR = Protected ranking
- ITF = ITF entry
- JE = Junior exempt
- w/o = Walkover
- r = Retired
- d = Defaulted
- SR = Special ranking

=== Finals ===
Semifinals
6	(China) Wang Yafan	6	3	3
7	Diana Shnaider	3	6	6
4	(Italy) Elisabetta Cocciaretto	7^{7}	6
(Belgium) Greet Minnen	6^{4}	1

Final
7	Diana Shnaider	3	2
4	(Italy) Elisabetta Cocciaretto	6	6

=== Top half ===
First round
9	(Japan) N Hibino	4	6	6
(United Kingdom) H Dart	6	4	1
Q	E Andreeva	6	6
(Denmark) C Tauson	3	0
(Belgium) Y Wickmayer	3	2
(Italy) S Errani	6	6
LL	(Japan) M Hontama	6^{6}	4
6	(China) Y Wang	7^{8}	6
3	(Italy) M Trevisan	3	6	6
(Mexico) R Zarazúa	6	3	1
WC	(United States) M Sieg	3	2
(France) O Dodin	6	6
(Romania) J Cristian	6	3	6
Q	(Australia) O Gadecki	2	6	3
WC	(United States) D Hewitt	2	4
7	D Shnaider	6	6

Second round
9	(Japan) N Hibino	6	6^{3}	3
Q	E Andreeva	2	7^{7}	6
(Italy) S Errani	4	4
6	(China) Y Wang	6	6
3	(Italy) M Trevisan	5	6	6^{9}
(France) O Dodin	7	4	7^{11}
(Romania) J Cristian	1	5
7	D Shnaider	6	7

Quarterfinals
Q	E Andreeva	2	4
6	(China) Y Wang	6	6
(France) O Dodin	3	2
7	D Shnaider	6	6

Semifinals
6	(China) Y Wang	6	3	3
7	D Shnaider	3	6	6

=== Bottom half ===
First round
5	(China) L Zhu	6	4	5
Q	(United States) M Kessler	3	6	7
K Rakhimova	6	6
WC	(United States) L Chirico	4	4
(France) A Cornet	5	1
Q	(Spain) M Bassols Ribera	7	6
(Australia) Ar Rodionova	3	2
4	(Italy) E Cocciaretto	6	6
8	(Germany) T Korpatsch	2	4
(Belgium) G Minnen	6	6
(United States) K Day	7	5	4
A Sasnovich	5	7	6
WC	(United States) M Mateas	1	6	1
(United States) E Bektas	6	4	6
(Spain) R Masarova	6	4	7
2	(Netherlands) A Rus	3	6	5

Second round
Q	(United States) M Kessler	7	6
K Rakhimova	5	2
Q	(Spain) M Bassols Ribera	0	3
4	(Italy) E Cocciaretto	6	6
(Belgium) G Minnen	6	6
A Sasnovich	1	2
(United States) E Bektas	3	3
(Spain) R Masarova	6	6

Quarterfinals
Q	(United States) M Kessler	5	3
4	(Italy) E Cocciaretto	7	6
(Belgium) G Minnen	7^{7}	3	6
(Spain) R Masarova	6^{2}	6	3

Semifinals
4	(Italy) E Cocciaretto	7^{7}	6
(Belgium) G Minnen	6^{4}	1

== Qualifying ==
=== Seeds ===
1. (United States) Emina Bektas (moved to main draw)
2. (Spain) Rebeka Masarova (moved to main draw)
3. Aliaksandra Sasnovich (moved to main draw)
4. Erika Andreeva (qualified)
5. (Italy) Sara Errani (moved to main draw)
6. (Mexico) Renata Zarazúa (moved to main draw)
7. (France) Alizé Cornet (moved to main draw)
8. (Australia) Arina Rodionova (moved to main draw)

=== Qualifiers ===
1. (Australia) Olivia Gadecki
2. (United States) McCartney Kessler
3. (Spain) Marina Bassols Ribera
4. Erika Andreeva

=== Lucky loser ===
1. (Japan) Mai Hontama

=== Qualifying draw ===
==== First qualifier ====
First round
Alt	(Brazil) Ingrid Martins	5	4
WC	(United States) Usue Maitane Arconada	7	6
(Hungary) Dalma Gálfi	1	6^{1}
Alt	(Australia) Olivia Gadecki	6	7^{7}

Qualifying competition
WC	(United States) Usue Maitane Arconada	2	1
Alt	(Australia) Olivia Gadecki	6	6

==== Second qualifier ====
First round
Alt	(Switzerland) Conny Perrin	2	1
(Japan) Mai Hontama	6	6
(Latvia) Darja Semeņistaja	3	1
Alt	(United States) McCartney Kessler	6	6

Qualifying competition
(Japan) Mai Hontama	1	2
Alt	(United States) McCartney Kessler	6	6

==== Third qualifier ====
First round
Alt	(Australia) Taylah Preston	6	4	6
(United Kingdom) Heather Watson	4	6	2
(Spain) Marina Bassols Ribera	6	6
Alt	(United States) Sophie Chang	1	2

Qualifying competition
Alt	(Australia) Taylah Preston	6	3	5
(Spain) Marina Bassols Ribera	4	6	7

==== Fourth qualifier ====
First round
4	Erika Andreeva	6	6
(Ukraine) Yulia Starodubtseva	4	1
WC	(United States) Raveena Kingsley	6^{6}	6	3
Alt	(Ukraine) Nadiia Kichenok	7^{8}	3	6

Qualifying competition
4	Erika Andreeva	6	6
Alt	(Ukraine) Nadiia Kichenok	1	4
