= 2017 Mallorca Open =

- Date: 19–25 June
- Edition: 2nd
- Category: WTA International tournaments
- Draw: 32S / 16D
- Prize money: $250,000
- Surface: Grass
- Location: Santa Ponsa, Mallorca, Spain
- Venue: Santa Ponsa Tennis Club

Champions

Singles
- (Latvia) Anastasija Sevastova

Doubles
- (Chinese Taipei) Chan Yung-jan / (Switzerland) Martina Hingis
- Mallorca Open

The 2017 Mallorca Open was a women's tennis tournament played on outdoor grass courts. It was the second edition of the Mallorca Open, and part of the International category of the 2017 WTA Tour. It took place at Santa Ponsa Tennis Club in Mallorca, Spain, from 19 June through 25 June 2017. Second-seeded Anastasija Sevastova won the singles title.

== Finals ==
=== Singles ===
(Latvia) Anastasija Sevastova defeated (Germany) Julia Görges, 6–4, 3–6, 6–3

- It was Sevastova's only singles title of the year and the 2nd of her career.

=== Doubles ===
- (Chinese Taipei) Chan Yung-jan / (Switzerland) Martina Hingis defeated (Serbia) Jelena Janković / (Latvia) Anastasija Sevastova, walkover

== Points and prize money ==
=== Point distribution ===
Event	W	F	SF	QF	Round of 16	Round of 32	Q	Q2	Q1
Singles	280	180	110	60	30	1	18	12	1
Doubles	280	180	110	60	1	—N/a	—N/a	—N/a	—N/a

=== Prize money ===
Event	W	F	SF	QF	Round of 16	Round of 32	Q2	Q1
Singles	€34,677	€17,258	€9,274	€4,980	€2,742	€1,694	€823	€884
Doubles	€9,919	€5,161	€2,770	€1,468	€774	—N/a	—N/a	—N/a

== WTA singles main-draw entrants ==
=== Seeds ===
Country	Player	Rank^{1}	Seed
RUS	Anastasia Pavlyuchenkova	18	1
LAT	Anastasija Sevastova	19	2
FRA	Caroline Garcia	21	3
ESP	Carla Suárez Navarro	23	4
NED	Kiki Bertens	27	5
ITA	Roberta Vinci	32	6
CRO	Ana Konjuh	33	7
HUN	Tímea Babos	36	8

- ^{1} Rankings are as of 12 June 2017.

=== Other entrants ===
The following players received wildcards into the main draw:

- (Belarus) Victoria Azarenka
- (Germany) Sabine Lisicki
- (Italy) Francesca Schiavone
- (Spain) Sara Sorribes Tormo

The following players received entry from the qualifying draw:

- (Paraguay) Verónica Cepede Royg
- (Slovakia) Jana Čepelová
- (Belgium) Kirsten Flipkens
- (Brazil) Beatriz Haddad Maia
- (Tunisia) Ons Jabeur
- (Russia) Anna Kalinskaya

The following player received entry as a lucky loser:

- (Italy) Sara Errani

=== Withdrawals ===
Before the tournament

- (Germany) Annika Beck →replaced by (Luxembourg) Mandy Minella
- (Estonia) Anett Kontaveit →replaced by (Italy) Sara Errani
- (Romania) Monica Niculescu →replaced by (Japan) Risa Ozaki
- (Germany) Laura Siegemund →replaced by (United States) Varvara Lepchenko

=== Retirements ===
- (Netherlands) Kiki Bertens

== WTA doubles main-draw entrants ==
=== Seeds ===
Country	Player	Country	Player	Rank^{1}	Seed
TPE	Chan Yung-jan	SUI	Martina Hingis	9	1
HUN	Tímea Babos	CZE	Andrea Hlaváčková	19	2
GER	Anna-Lena Grönefeld	CZE	Květa Peschke	54	3
SLO	Andreja Klepač	ESP	María José Martínez Sánchez	61	4

- ^{1} Rankings are as of 12 June 2017.

=== Other entrants ===
The following pairs received wildcards into the doubles main draw:

- (Canada) Eugenie Bouchard / (Germany) Sabine Lisicki
- (Paraguay) Verónica Cepede Royg / (Spain) Sara Sorribes Tormo

=== Withdrawals ===
During the tournament

- (Germany) Julia Görges (gastrointestinal illness)
- (Latvia) Anastasija Sevastova
