= 2021 LTP Women's Open =

- Date: 26 July – 1 August
- Edition: 1st
- Category: WTA 125K series
- Draw: 32S / 10D
- Prize money: $115,000
- Surface: Green clay
- Location: Charleston, South Carolina, United States
- Venue: LTP Mount Pleasant

Champions

Singles
- (United States) Varvara Lepchenko

Doubles
- (Chinese Taipei) Liang En-shuo / (Canada) Rebecca Marino
LTP Charleston Pro Tennis	· 2024 →

The 2021 LTP Women's Open was a professional tennis tournament played on outdoor green clay courts. It was the 1st edition of the tournament and part of the 2021 WTA 125K series, offering a total of $115,000 in prize money. It took place in Charleston, South Carolina, United States from 26 July to 1 August 2021.

== Singles main-draw entrants ==
=== Seeds ===
Country	Player	Rank^{1}	Seed
USA	Madison Brengle	78	1
USA	Lauren Davis	95	2
AUS	Maddison Inglis	142	3
USA	Varvara Lepchenko	154	4
GER	Tatjana Maria	174	5
BRA	Beatriz Haddad Maia	185	6
USA	Sachia Vickery	197	7
USA	Usue Maitane Arconada	198	8

- ^{1} Rankings as of 19 July 2021.

=== Other entrants ===
The following players received a wildcard into the singles main draw:

- (United States) Louisa Chirico
- (United States) Fiona Crawley
- (United States) Ellie Douglas
- (Serbia) Katarina Jokić

The following players received entry using protected rankings:

- (Canada) Rebecca Marino
- (Thailand) Peangtarn Plipuech
- (Canada) Carol Zhao

=== Withdrawals ===
Before the tournament

- (United States) Hailey Baptiste → replaced by (United States) Emma Navarro
- (Germany) Mona Barthel → replaced by (United States) Robin Anderson
- (Spain) Aliona Bolsova → replaced by (United States) Maria Mateas
- (France) Clara Burel → replaced by (Ukraine) Kateryna Bondarenko
- (Australia) Lizette Cabrera → replaced by (United States) Hanna Chang
- (United Kingdom) Harriet Dart → replaced by (Thailand) Peangtarn Plipuech
- (United States) Francesca Di Lorenzo → replaced by (South Korea) Han Na-lae
- (United States) Caroline Dolehide → replaced by (United States) Usue Maitane Arconada
- (Poland) Magdalena Fręch → replaced by (United States) Catherine Harrison
- (Russia) Anastasia Gasanova → replaced by (United States) Sachia Vickery
- (Italy) Giulia Gatto-Monticone → replaced by (Brazil) Beatriz Haddad Maia
- (Switzerland) Leonie Küng → replaced by (Chinese Taipei) Liang En-shuo
- (United States) Christina McHale → replaced by (United States) Allie Kiick
- (Spain) Nuria Párrizas Díaz → replaced by (United States) Whitney Osuigwe
- (Russia) Natalia Vikhlyantseva → replaced by (Indonesia) Aldila Sutjiadi
- (Mexico) Renata Zarazúa → replaced by (United States) Alexa Glatch

== Doubles entrants ==
=== Seeds ===
Country	Player	Country	Player	Rank^{1}	Seed
NZL	Erin Routliffe	INA	Aldila Sutjiadi	281	1
UKR	Kateryna Bondarenko	GER	Tatjana Maria	298	2
USA	Quinn Gleason	USA	Jamie Loeb	337	3
USA	Catherine Harrison	USA	Maria Sanchez	349	4

- ^{1} Rankings as of 19 July 2021.

=== Other entrants ===
The following pair received a wildcard into the doubles main draw:

- (United States) Sophie Chang / (United States) Emma Navarro

== Champions ==
=== Singles ===
- (United States) Varvara Lepchenko def. (United States) Jamie Loeb 7–6^{(7–4)}, 4–6, 6–4

=== Doubles ===
- (Chinese Taipei) Liang En-shuo / (Canada) Rebecca Marino def. (New Zealand) Erin Routliffe / (Indonesia) Aldila Sutjiadi, 5–7, 7–5, [10–7]
