= 2017 Mallorca Open – Singles =

Singles
- 2017 Mallorca Open

Final
- Champion: (Latvia) Anastasija Sevastova
- Runner-up: (Germany) Julia Görges
- Score: 6–4, 3–6, 6–3

Details
- Draw: 32
- Seeds: 8

Events
Singles	Doubles
- Mallorca Open

Caroline Garcia was the defending champion, but lost in the semifinals to Anastasija Sevastova in a rematch of the previous year's final.

Sevastova went on to win the title, defeating Julia Görges in the final, 6–4, 3–6, 6–3.

The tournament marked the return of Victoria Azarenka from maternity leave. She lost in the second round to Ana Konjuh.

== Seeds ==
1. (Russia) Anastasia Pavlyuchenkova (second round)
2. (Latvia) Anastasija Sevastova (champion)
3. (France) Caroline Garcia (semifinals)
4. (Spain) Carla Suárez Navarro (first round)
5. (Netherlands) Kiki Bertens (first round, retired)
6. (Italy) Roberta Vinci (quarterfinals)
7. (Croatia) Ana Konjuh (quarterfinals)
8. (Hungary) Tímea Babos (first round)

== Draw ==
Key

- Q = Qualifier
- WC = Wild card
- LL = Lucky loser
- Alt = Alternate
- ITF = ITF entry
- PR = Protected ranking
- SR = Special ranking
- SE = Special exempt
- JE = Junior exempt
- JR = Junior Accelerator Programme entrant
- CO = College Accelerator Programme entrant
- NG = Next Gen Accelerator Program entrant
- w/o = Walkover
- r = Retired
- d = Defaulted

=== Finals ===
Semifinals
(Germany) Julia Görges	6	6
(United States) Catherine Bellis	1	1
3	(France) Caroline Garcia	4	2
2	(Latvia) Anastasija Sevastova	6	6

Final
(Germany) Julia Görges	4	6	3
2	(Latvia) Anastasija Sevastova	6	3	6

=== Top half ===
First round
1	(Russia) A Pavlyuchenkova	4	7	6
WC	(Spain) S Sorribes Tormo	6	5	4
(Germany) J Görges	6	6
(Spain) L Arrubarrena	1	2
Q	(Brazil) B Haddad Maia	6^{4}	3
(United States) S Rogers	7^{7}	6
WC	(Germany) S Lisicki	6	3	0
5	(Netherlands) K Bertens	2	6	0^{r}
4	(Spain) C Suárez Navarro	3	5
(United States) C Bellis	6	7
Q	(Russia) A Kalinskaya	6^{6}	4
(Germany) M Barthel	7^{8}	6
WC	(Italy) F Schiavone	6^{5}	6	6
(Canada) E Bouchard	7^{7}	4	3
(Czech Republic) Kr Plíšková	6	3	6
8	(Hungary) T Babos	2	6	3

Second round
1	(Russia) A Pavlyuchenkova	1	2
(Germany) J Görges	6	6
(United States) S Rogers	3	4
WC	(Germany) S Lisicki	6	6
(United States) C Bellis	4	6	6
(Germany) M Barthel	6	4	2
WC	(Italy) F Schiavone	3	6^{7}
(Czech Republic) Kr Plíšková	6	7^{9}

Quarterfinals
(Germany) J Görges	6	6
WC	(Germany) S Lisicki	2	4
(United States) C Bellis	6	6
(Czech Republic) Kr Plíšková	3	2

Semifinals
(Germany) J Görges	6	6
(United States) C Bellis	1	1

=== Bottom half ===
First round
6	(Italy) R Vinci	6	6
LL	(Italy) S Errani	2	1
Q	(Belgium) K Flipkens	3	6	6
(Luxembourg) M Minella	6	3	2
(France) P Parmentier	2	0
Q	(Slovakia) J Čepelová	6	6
(Serbia) J Janković	4	4
3	(France) C Garcia	6	6
7	(Croatia) A Konjuh	7^{7}	4	6
Q	(Tunisia) O Jabeur	6^{1}	6	3
(Japan) R Ozaki	3	6	6^{7}
WC	(Belarus) V Azarenka	6	4	7^{9}
(United States) V Lepchenko	3	6	7^{7}
Q	(Paraguay) V Cepede Royg	6	3	6^{4}
(Belgium) E Mertens	6^{2}	7	1
2	(Latvia) A Sevastova	7^{7}	5	6

Second round
6	(Italy) R Vinci	6	5	6
Q	(Belgium) K Flipkens	4	7	2
Q	(Slovakia) J Čepelová	3	7^{7}	3
3	(France) C Garcia	6	6^{5}	6
7	(Croatia) A Konjuh	6	6
WC	(Belarus) V Azarenka	1	3
(United States) V Lepchenko	7^{7}	1	3
2	(Latvia) A Sevastova	6^{2}	6	6

Quarterfinals
6	(Italy) R Vinci	2	6^{8}
3	(France) C Garcia	6	7^{10}
7	(Croatia) A Konjuh	5	6	6^{5}
2	(Latvia) A Sevastova	7	1	7^{7}

Semifinals
3	(France) C Garcia	4	2
2	(Latvia) A Sevastova	6	6

== Qualifying ==
=== Seeds ===
1. (Germany) Carina Witthöft (qualifying competition)
2. (Italy) Sara Errani (qualifying competition, Lucky loser)
3. (Belgium) Kirsten Flipkens (qualified)
4. (Paraguay) Verónica Cepede Royg (qualified)
5. (Belgium) Yanina Wickmayer (qualifying competition)
6. (Belarus) Aliaksandra Sasnovich (first round)
7. (Brazil) Beatriz Haddad Maia (qualified)
8. (Slovakia) Jana Čepelová (qualified)
9. (Tunisia) Ons Jabeur (qualified)
10. (Colombia) Mariana Duque Mariño (first round)
11. (Russia) Anna Kalinskaya (qualified)
12. (Czech Republic) Tereza Martincová (qualifying competition)

=== Qualifiers ===
1. (Russia) Anna Kalinskaya
2. (Slovakia) Jana Čepelová
3. (Belgium) Kirsten Flipkens
4. (Paraguay) Verónica Cepede Royg
5. (Tunisia) Ons Jabeur
6. (Brazil) Beatriz Haddad Maia

=== Lucky loser ===
1. (Italy) Sara Errani

=== Draw ===
==== First qualifier ====
First round
1	(Germany) Carina Witthöft	6	6
WC	(Spain) Rosa Vicens Mas	1	1
WC	(Ukraine) Marta Kostyuk	2	5
11	(Russia) Anna Kalinskaya	6	7

Qualifying competition
1	(Germany) Carina Witthöft	4	6^{3}
11	(Russia) Anna Kalinskaya	6	7^{7}

==== Second qualifier ====
First round
2	(Italy) Sara Errani	6	6
(Liechtenstein) Kathinka von Deichmann	3	3
(Paraguay) Montserrat González	2	0
8	(Slovakia) Jana Čepelová	6	6

Qualifying competition
2	(Italy) Sara Errani	4	3
8	(Slovakia) Jana Čepelová	6	6

==== Third qualifier ====
First round
3	(Belgium) Kirsten Flipkens	6	6
(Russia) Polina Monova	0	3
(Russia) Veronika Kudermetova	4	6	6
10	(Colombia) Mariana Duque Mariño	6	2	3

Qualifying competition
3	(Belgium) Kirsten Flipkens	4	6	6
(Russia) Veronika Kudermetova	6	0	4

==== Fourth qualifier ====
First round
4	(Paraguay) Verónica Cepede Royg	5	7	6
(United States) Jamie Loeb	7	5	4
WC	(Spain) Yvonne Cavallé Reimers	5	4
12	(Czech Republic) Tereza Martincová	7	6

Qualifying competition
4	(Paraguay) Verónica Cepede Royg	3	6	6
12	(Czech Republic) Tereza Martincová	6	4	3

==== Fifth qualifier ====
First round
5	(Belgium) Yanina Wickmayer	6	6
(Spain) Sílvia Soler Espinosa	3	2
(Germany) Antonia Lottner	6^{6}	6	3
9	(Tunisia) Ons Jabeur	7^{8}	3	6

Qualifying competition
5	(Belgium) Yanina Wickmayer	2	2
9	(Tunisia) Ons Jabeur	6	6

==== Sixth qualifier ====
First round
6	(Belarus) Aliaksandra Sasnovich	3	7^{7}	3
(United States) Sofia Kenin	6	6^{5}	6
WC	(Germany) Katharina Hobgarski	5	6	3
7	(Brazil) Beatriz Haddad Maia	7	4	6

Qualifying competition
(United States) Sofia Kenin	3	4
7	(Brazil) Beatriz Haddad Maia	6	6
