= 2024 Fifth Third Charleston 125 – Doubles =

Doubles
- 2024 Fifth Third Charleston 125

Final
- Champions: (Australia) Olivia Gadecki (United Kingdom) Olivia Nicholls
- Runners-up: (Italy) Sara Errani (Slovakia) Tereza Mihalíková
- Score: 6–2, 6–1

Events
Singles	Doubles
← 2021 ·	LTP Charleston Pro Tennis	· 2024 →

Liang En-shuo and Rebecca Marino were the reigning champions from when the event was last held in 2021, but did not participate this year.

Olivia Gadecki and Olivia Nicholls won the title, defeating Sara Errani and Tereza Mihalíková in the final, 6–2, 6–1.

== Seeds ==
1. Irina Khromacheva / (Romania) Monica Niculescu (semifinals)
2. (Ukraine) Nadiia Kichenok / (Chinese Taipei) Wu Fang-hsien (first round)
3. (Kazakhstan) Anna Danilina / (China) Zhang Shuai (semifinals)
4. (Italy) Sara Errani / (Slovakia) Tereza Mihalíková (final)

== Draw ==
=== Key ===
- Q = Qualifier
- WC = Wild card
- LL = Lucky loser
- Alt = Alternate
- SE = Special exempt
- PR = Protected ranking
- ITF = ITF entry
- JE = Junior exempt
- w/o = Walkover
- r = Retired
- d = Defaulted
- SR = Special ranking

=== Draw ===
First round
1	I Khromacheva (Romania) M Niculescu	6	6
(United States) S Chang (United States) A Kulikov	3	1
(Thailand) L Kumkhum (Thailand) P Plipuech	6	6
(Germany) J Lohoff (Switzerland) C Perrin	0	2
4	(Italy) S Errani (Slovakia) T Mihalíková	w/o
(United States) M Kessler (Ukraine) Y Starodubtseva
(United Kingdom) H Dart (United Kingdom) H Watson	4	6	[11]
(Spain) M Bassols Ribera (Netherlands) A Rus	6	1	[9]
WC	(United States) D Hewitt (United States) M Mateas	7^{7}	7
(Latvia) D Semeņistaja (Mexico) R Zarazúa	6^{2}	5
(Brazil) I Martins; L Marozava	6^{4}	3
3	(Kazakhstan) A Danilina (China) S Zhang	7^{7}	6
(Hungary) D Gálfi (Japan) M Hontama	7	3	[8]
(Australia) O Gadecki (United Kingdom) O Nicholls	5	6	[10]
(United States) C Harrison (United States) S Santamaria	6	3	[10]
2	(Ukraine) N Kichenok (Chinese Taipei) F-h Wu	3	6	[7]

Quarterfinals
1	I Khromacheva (Romania) M Niculescu	6	3	[10]
(Thailand) L Kumkhum (Thailand) P Plipuech	3	6	[6]
4	(Italy) S Errani (Slovakia) T Mihalíková	4	6	[10]
(United Kingdom) H Dart (United Kingdom) H Watson	6	2	[6]
WC	(United States) D Hewitt (United States) M Mateas	1	6	[7]
3	(Kazakhstan) A Danilina (China) S Zhang	6	3	[10]
(Australia) O Gadecki (United Kingdom) O Nicholls	6	6
(United States) C Harrison (United States) S Santamaria	2	1

Semifinals
1	I Khromacheva (Romania) M Niculescu	4	3
4	(Italy) S Errani (Slovakia) T Mihalíková	6	6
3	(Kazakhstan) A Danilina (China) S Zhang	6^{6}	4
(Australia) O Gadecki (United Kingdom) O Nicholls	7^{8}	6

Final
4	(Italy) S Errani (Slovakia) T Mihalíková	2	1
(Australia) O Gadecki (United Kingdom) O Nicholls	6	6
