= 2021 LTP Women's Open – Singles =

Singles
- 2021 LTP Women's Open

Final
- Champion: (United States) Varvara Lepchenko
- Runner-up: (United States) Jamie Loeb
- Score: 7–6^{(7–4)}, 4–6, 6–4

Events
Singles	Doubles
LTP Charleston Pro Tennis	· 2024 →

This was the first edition of the tournament as part of the WTA 125K series.

Varvara Lepchenko won the title, defeating Jamie Loeb in the final, 7–6^{(7–4)}, 4–6, 6–4.

== Seeds ==
1. (United States) Madison Brengle (first round)
2. (United States) Lauren Davis (semifinals)
3. (Australia) Maddison Inglis (second round)
4. (United States) Varvara Lepchenko (champion)
5. (Germany) Tatjana Maria (first round)
6. (Brazil) Beatriz Haddad Maia (first round)
7. (United States) Sachia Vickery (first round, retired)
8. (United States) Usue Maitane Arconada (first round)

== Draw ==
=== Key ===
- Q = Qualifier
- WC = Wild card
- LL = Lucky loser
- Alt = Alternate
- SE = Special exempt
- PR = Protected ranking
- ITF = ITF entry
- JE = Junior exempt
- w/o = Walkover
- r = Retired
- d = Defaulted
- SR = Special ranking

=== Finals ===
Semifinals
(United States) Jamie Loeb	6	6
(Ukraine) Kateryna Bondarenko	4	2
4	(United States) Varvara Lepchenko	7	6
2	(United States) Lauren Davis	5	3

Final
(United States) Jamie Loeb	6^{4}	6	4
4	(United States) Varvara Lepchenko	7^{7}	4	6

=== Top half ===
First round
1	(United States) M Brengle	0	3
(United States) K Scott	6	6
(United States) W Osuigwe	3	6^{3}
(United States) J Loeb	6	7^{7}
WC	(Serbia) K Jokić	2	6	4
(Chinese Taipei) E-s Liang	6	0	6
(United States) A Kiick	6	2
7	(United States) S Vickery	4	1^{r}
3	(Australia) M Inglis	6	6
WC	(United States) F Crawley	1	4
(Ukraine) K Bondarenko	6	6
PR	(Thailand) P Plipuech	0	3
(United States) A Glatch	6	6
(United States) Q Gleason	2	2
(United States) E Navarro	7^{7}	6
6	(Brazil) B Haddad Maia	6^{5}	0

Second round
(United States) K Scott	1	6	3
(United States) J Loeb	6	4	6
(Chinese Taipei) E-s Liang	4	6	6
(United States) A Kiick	6	0	2
3	(Australia) M Inglis	3	2
(Ukraine) K Bondarenko	6	6
(United States) A Glatch	3	3
(United States) E Navarro	6	6

Quarterfinals
(United States) J Loeb	6	6
(Chinese Taipei) E-s Liang	3	3
(Ukraine) K Bondarenko	6	6
(United States) E Navarro	3	3

Semifinals
(United States) J Loeb	6	6
(Ukraine) K Bondarenko	4	2

=== Bottom half ===
First round
5	(Germany) T Maria	2	4
(South Korea) N-l Han	6	6
(United States) H Chang	6	6
WC	(United States) E Douglas	3	4
(United States) W Pate	2	4
(United States) T Kinard	6	6
PR	(Canada) C Zhao	1	5
4	(United States) V Lepchenko	6	7
8	(United States) UM Arconada	5	3
(Indonesia) A Sutjiadi	7	6
WC	(United States) L Chirico	4	3
(United States) M Mateas	6	6
PR	(Canada) R Marino	6	6
(United States) C Harrison	4	4
(United States) S Chang	3	4
2	(United States) L Davis	6	6

Second round
(South Korea) N-l Han	4	3
(United States) H Chang	6	6
(United States) T Kinard	2	3
4	(United States) V Lepchenko	6	6
(Indonesia) A Sutjiadi	6^{5}	4
(United States) M Mateas	7^{7}	6
PR	(Canada) R Marino	4	2
2	(United States) L Davis	6	6

Quarterfinals
(United States) H Chang	1	1
4	(United States) V Lepchenko	6	6
(United States) M Mateas	3	5
2	(United States) L Davis	6	7

Semifinals
4	(United States) V Lepchenko	7	6
2	(United States) L Davis	5	3
