= 2021 LTP Women's Open – Doubles =

Doubles
- 2021 LTP Women's Open

Final
- Champions: (Chinese Taipei) Liang En-shuo (Canada) Rebecca Marino
- Runners-up: (New Zealand) Erin Routliffe (Indonesia) Aldila Sutjiadi
- Score: 5–7, 7–5, [10–7]

Events
Singles	Doubles
LTP Charleston Pro Tennis	· 2024 →

This was the first edition of the tournament as part of the WTA 125K series.

Liang En-shuo and Rebecca Marino won the title, defeating Erin Routliffe and Aldila Sutjiadi in the final, 5–7, 7–5, [10–7].

== Seeds ==
1. (New Zealand) Erin Routliffe / (Indonesia) Aldila Sutjiadi (final)
2. (Ukraine) Kateryna Bondarenko / (Germany) Tatjana Maria (semifinals)
3. (United States) Quinn Gleason / (United States) Jamie Loeb (semifinals)
4. (United States) Catherine Harrison / (United States) Maria Sanchez (quarterfinals)

== Draw ==
=== Key ===
- Q = Qualifier
- WC = Wild card
- LL = Lucky loser
- Alt = Alternate
- SE = Special exempt
- PR = Protected ranking
- ITF = ITF entry
- JE = Junior exempt
- w/o = Walkover
- r = Retired
- d = Defaulted
- SR = Special ranking

=== Draw ===
First round
(United States) M Mateas (United States) W Osuigwe	3	6	[10]
(United States) E Douglas (Serbia) K Jokić	6	1	[4]
(United States) M Brengle (United States) S Vickery	6	2	[4]
WC	(United States) S Chang (United States) E Navarro	2	6	[10]

Quarterfinals
1	(New Zealand) E Routliffe (Indonesia) A Sutjiadi	6	6
(South Korea) N-l Han (Thailand) P Plipuech	1	4
3	(United States) Q Gleason (United States) J Loeb	6	6
(United States) M Mateas (United States) W Osuigwe	1	1
(Chinese Taipei) E-s Liang (Canada) R Marino	4	7	[10]
4	(United States) C Harrison (United States) M Sanchez	6	5	[8]
WC	(United States) S Chang (United States) E Navarro	2	4
2	(Ukraine) K Bondarenko (Germany) T Maria	6	6

Semifinals
1	(New Zealand) E Routliffe (Indonesia) A Sutjiadi	6	6
3	(United States) Q Gleason (United States) J Loeb	4	2
(Chinese Taipei) E-s Liang (Canada) R Marino	7	7
2	(Ukraine) K Bondarenko (Germany) T Maria	5	5

Final
1	(New Zealand) E Routliffe (Indonesia) A Sutjiadi	7	5	[7]
(Chinese Taipei) E-s Liang (Canada) R Marino	5	7	[10]
