= 2024 Fifth Third Charleston 125 =

- Date: 11 – 16 March
- Edition: 2nd
- Category: WTA 125
- Draw: 32S / 16D
- Prize money: $115,000
- Surface: Outdoor hard
- Location: Charleston, South Carolina, United States
- Venue: LTP Mount Pleasant

Champions

Singles
- (Italy) Elisabetta Cocciaretto

Doubles
- (Australia) Olivia Gadecki / (United Kingdom) Olivia Nicholls
← 2021 ·	LTP Charleston Pro Tennis	· 2024 →

The 2024 Fifth Third Charleston 125, sponsored by the Fifth Third Bank, was a professional women's tennis tournament played on outdoor hard courts. It was the 2nd edition of the tournament and part of the 2024 WTA 125 tournaments, offering a total of $115,000 in prize money. The first edition in 2021 was held on green clay but the surface was changed to hard in 2024. It took place at LTP Mount Pleasant in Charleston, South Carolina, United States from 11 to 16 March 2024.

== Singles main-draw entrants ==
=== Seeds ===
Country	Player	Rank^{1}	Seed
~~FRA~~	~~Clara Burel~~	~~47~~	~~1~~
NED	Arantxa Rus	48	2
ITA	Martina Trevisan	59	3
ITA	Elisabetta Cocciaretto	60	4
CHN	Zhu Lin	62	5
CHN	Wang Yafan	66	6
	Diana Shnaider	74	7
GER	Tamara Korpatsch	76	8
JPN	Nao Hibino	80	9

- ^{1} Rankings as of 4 March 2024.

=== Other entrants ===
The following players received a wildcard into the singles main draw:

- (United States) Louisa Chirico
- (United States) Dalayna Hewitt
- (United States) Maria Mateas
- (United States) Madison Sieg

The following players received entry into the singles main draw through qualification:

- Erika Andreeva
- (Spain) Marina Bassols Ribera
- (Australia) Olivia Gadecki
- (United States) McCartney Kessler

The following player received entry as a lucky loser:

- (Japan) Mai Hontama

=== Withdrawals ===
- (France) Clara Burel → replaced by (Japan) Mai Hontama

== Doubles entrants ==
=== Seeds ===
Country	Player	Country	Player	Rank^{1}	Seed
	Irina Khromacheva	ROU	Monica Niculescu	99	1
UKR	Nadiia Kichenok	TPE	Wu Fang-hsien	112	2
KAZ	Anna Danilina	CHN	Zhang Shuai	112	3
ITA	Sara Errani	SVK	Tereza Mihalíková	120	4

- ^{1} Rankings as of 4 March 2024.

=== Other entrants ===
The following pair received a wildcard into the doubles main draw:

- (United States) Dalayna Hewitt / (United States) Maria Mateas

== Champions ==
=== Singles ===
- (Italy) Elisabetta Cocciaretto def. Diana Shnaider 6–3, 6–2

=== Doubles ===
- (Australia) Olivia Gadecki / (United Kingdom) Olivia Nicholls def. (Italy) Sara Errani / (Slovakia) Tereza Mihalíková 6–2, 6–1
