= 2017 Mallorca Open – Doubles =

Doubles
- 2017 Mallorca Open

Final
- Champions: (Chinese Taipei) Chan Yung-jan (Switzerland) Martina Hingis
- Runners-up: (Serbia) Jelena Janković (Latvia) Anastasija Sevastova
- Score: walkover

Details
- Draw: 16
- Seeds: 4

Events
| Singles | Doubles |
| ← 2016 · | Mallorca Open | · 2018 → |

Gabriela Dabrowski and María José Martínez Sánchez were the defending champions, but Dabrowski chose to compete in Birmingham instead. Martínez Sánchez played alongside Andreja Klepač, but lost in the quarterfinals to Jelena Janković and Anastasija Sevastova.

Chan Yung-jan and Martina Hingis won the title by walkover when Janković and Sevastova withdrew from the final.

== Seeds ==
1. (Chinese Taipei) Chan Yung-jan / (Switzerland) Martina Hingis (champions)
2. (Hungary) Tímea Babos / (Czech Republic) Andrea Hlaváčková (first round)
3. (Germany) Anna-Lena Grönefeld / (Czech Republic) Květa Peschke (quarterfinals)
4. (Slovenia) Andreja Klepač / (Spain) María José Martínez Sánchez (quarterfinals)

== Draw ==
Key

- Q = Qualifier
- WC = Wild card
- LL = Lucky loser
- Alt = Alternate
- ITF = ITF entry
- PR = Protected ranking
- SR = Special ranking
- SE = Special exempt
- JE = Junior exempt
- JR = Junior Accelerator Programme entrant
- CO = College Accelerator Programme entrant
- NG = Next Gen Accelerator Program entrant
- w/o = Walkover
- r = Retired
- d = Defaulted

=== Draw ===
First round
1 | (Chinese Taipei) Y-j Chan (Switzerland) M Hingis | 5 | 6 | [10]
WC | (Paraguay) V Cepede Royg (Spain) S Sorribes Tormo | 7 | 2 | [7]
(Romania) R Olaru (Czech Republic) R Voráčová | 3 | 3
(Belgium) E Mertens (Netherlands) D Schuurs | 6 | 6
3 | (Germany) A-L Grönefeld (Czech Republic) K Peschke | 6 | 6
(Spain) A Parra Santonja (Spain) S Soler Espinosa | 2 | 4
(Russia) A Pavlyuchenkova (Belgium) Y Wickmayer | 3 | 7^{8} | [10]
(United States) N Melichar (United Kingdom) A Smith | 6 | 6^{6} | [12]
(Serbia) J Janković (Latvia) A Sevastova | 6 | 7
(Australia) J Moore (Thailand) V Wongteanchai | 2 | 5
(Georgia (country)) O Kalashnikova (Ukraine) L Kichenok | 2 | 2
4 | (Slovenia) A Klepač (Spain) MJ Martínez Sánchez | 6 | 6
WC | (Canada) E Bouchard (Germany) S Lisicki | 4 | 6 | [6]
(Germany) J Görges (Switzerland) X Knoll | 6 | 4 | [10]
(Colombia) M Duque Mariño (Argentina) M Irigoyen | 6 | 7
2 | (Hungary) T Babos (Czech Republic) A Hlaváčková | 3 | 5

Quarterfinals
1 | (Chinese Taipei) Y-j Chan (Switzerland) M Hingis | 2 | 6 | [10]
(Belgium) E Mertens (Netherlands) D Schuurs | 6 | 3 | [7]
3 | (Germany) A-L Grönefeld (Czech Republic) K Peschke | 4 | 4
(United States) N Melichar (United Kingdom) A Smith | 6 | 6
(Serbia) J Janković (Latvia) A Sevastova | 3 | 6 | [10]
4 | (Slovenia) A Klepač (Spain) MJ Martínez Sánchez | 6 | 3 | [3]
(Germany) J Görges (Switzerland) X Knoll | 3 | 6 | [10]
(Colombia) M Duque Mariño (Argentina) M Irigoyen | 6 | 3 | [8]

Semifinals
1 | (Chinese Taipei) Y-j Chan (Switzerland) M Hingis | 6 | 6
(United States) N Melichar (United Kingdom) A Smith | 3 | 3
(Serbia) J Janković (Latvia) A Sevastova | w/o
(Germany) J Görges (Switzerland) X Knoll

Final
1 | (Chinese Taipei) Y-j Chan (Switzerland) M Hingis | w/o
(Serbia) J Janković (Latvia) A Sevastova
