= Varvara Lepchenko =

American tennis player (born 1986)

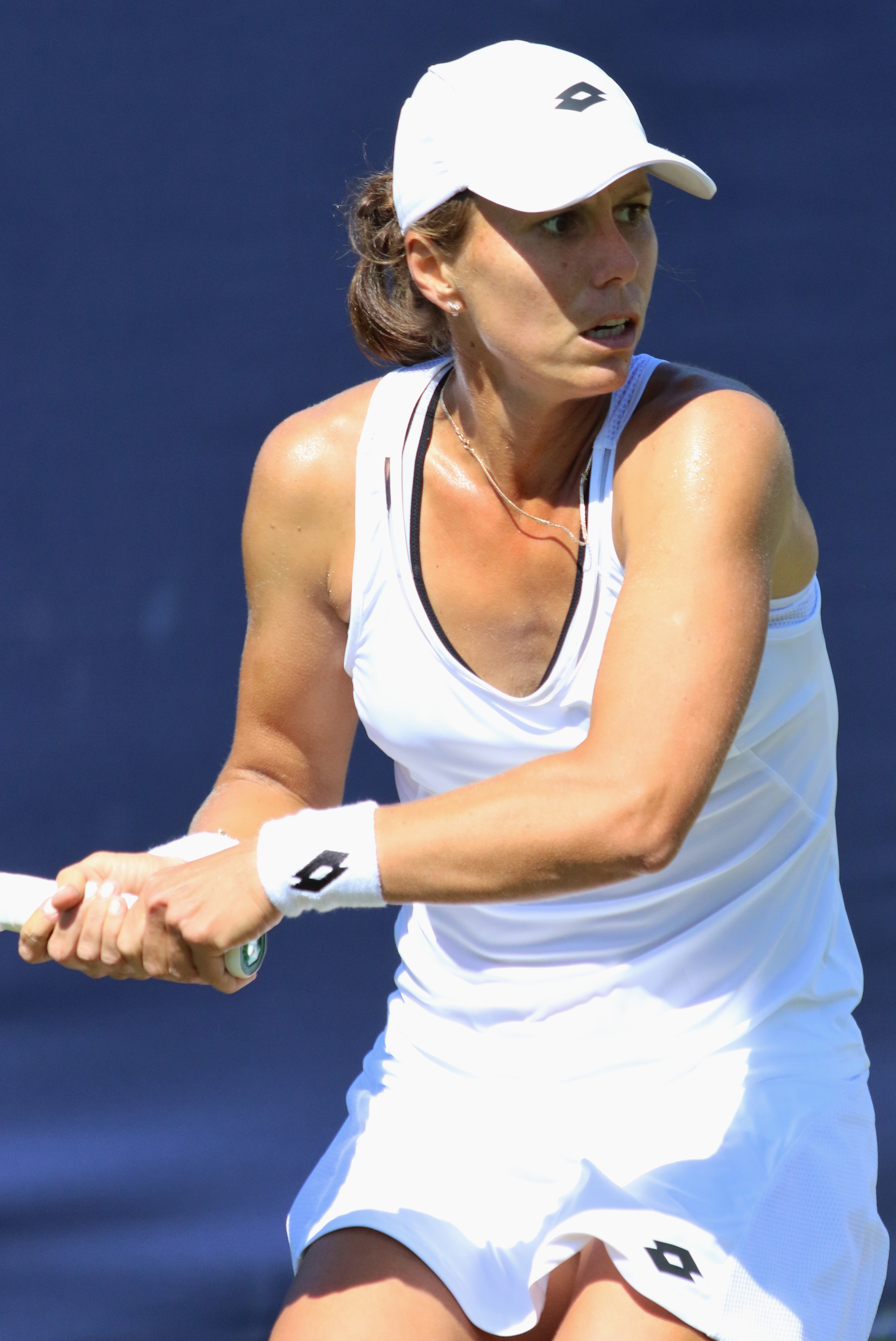
- Lepchenko in 2017
- Full name: Varvara Petrivna Lepchenko
- Native name: Варвара Петрiвна Лепченко
- Country (sports): Uzbekistan (2001–2006); United States (2007–present)
- Residence: Allentown, Pennsylvania, United States
- Born: May 21, 1986 (age 40) Tashkent, Uzbek SSR, Soviet Union
- Height: 1.80 m (5 ft 11 in)
- Turned pro: 2001
- Plays: Left-handed (two-handed backhand)
- Coach: Peter Lepchenko
- Prize money: US$ 5,699,580

Singles
- Career record: 719–544
- Career titles: 1 WTA 125, 13 ITF
- Highest ranking: No. 19 (October 1, 2012)
- Current ranking: No. 162 (May 4, 2026)

Grand Slam singles results
- Australian Open: 3R (2015, 2016)
- French Open: 4R (2012)
- Wimbledon: 3R (2012)
- US Open: 4R (2015)

Other tournaments
- Olympic Games: 2R (2012)

Doubles
- Career record: 124–176
- Career titles: 1 ITF
- Highest ranking: No. 40 (June 17, 2013)
- Current ranking: No. 345 (May 4, 2026)

Grand Slam doubles results
- Australian Open: SF (2013)
- French Open: QF (2013)
- Wimbledon: 2R (2012, 2013)
- US Open: 2R (2013, 2014)

Grand Slam mixed doubles results
- Wimbledon: 1R (2012)
- US Open: 2R (2012)
- Last updated on: 15 May 2026.

Varvara Petrivna Lepchenko (Note: Ukrainian: Варвара Петрiвна Лепченко, romanized: Varvara Petrivna Lepchenko) (born May 21, 1986) is an Uzbekistan-born American professional tennis player. She played for Uzbekistan before relocating to the United States. Lepchenko won a singles title on the WTA Challenger Tour and 13 singles titles and one doubles title on the ITF Women's Circuit, she won all her 14 ITF titles in the United States. Lepchenko has a career-high singles ranking of world No. 19, achieved in October 2012.

She was provisionally suspended from the WTA Tour in 2016 after testing positive for the heart medication meldonium, although she was found to "bear no fault or negligence" by the International Tennis Federation. In 2022, Lepchenko was suspended from tennis for four years (backdated to August 2021), after testing positive for the stimulant adrafinil, and its metabolite, modafinil. In February 2023, her suspension was reduced to 21 months, and she started playing again in May of that year.

== Early life and junior career ==
Lepchenko was born May 21, 1986, in Tashkent in the former Soviet Union in present-day Uzbekistan. She is of Ukrainian descent. She began playing tennis at age seven; her father Petr was her first coach. She turned pro in 2001, and reached a junior career-high of 244 on 5 January 2004.

== Professional ==
=== 2006–2012: Major and Olympics debuts ===
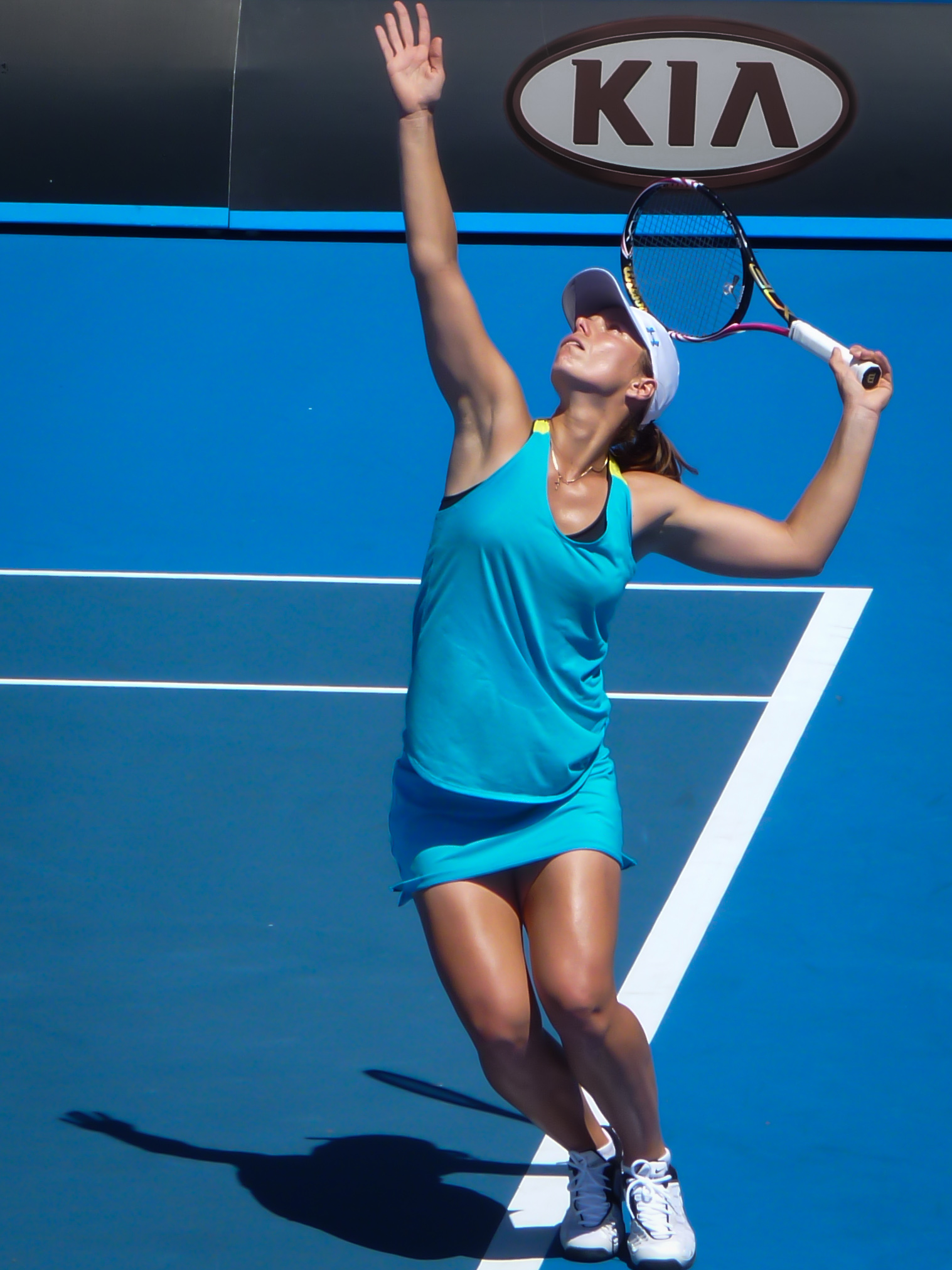
Lepchenko at the Australian Open in January 2012

In 2006 on her Grand Slam debut, Lepchenko reached the second round of the US Open. In October 2006, she was ranked No. 84 in the world.

In the 2009 Amelia Island Championships, as a lucky loser, she upset fourth seed Patty Schnyder in the first round. She also reached the final of an ITF tournament in Cuneo this year.

In 2010, Lepchenko reached the second rounds of the French Open and Wimbledon. She lost to Dominika Cibulková and Alona Bondarenko, respectively. At the 2011 French Open, Lepchenko defeated 18th seed Flavia Pennetta, in the first round.

Lepchenko started the year at the 2012 Auckland Open where she lost in the second round of qualifying to Anne Keothavong. At the Sydney International, she was defeated in the first round of qualifying by Maria Kirilenko. Coming through qualifying at the Australian Open, she lost in the first round to 20th seed Daniela Hantuchová. Seeded No. 7 for qualifying at the Open GdF Suez, Lepchenko lost in the final round of qualifying to top seed Mona Barthel, in straight sets. However, she received entry as a lucky loser into the main draw, but was defeated in the first round by compatriot Christina McHale. At the Qatar Open, Lepchenko advanced to the third round where she lost to world No. 6, Agnieszka Radwańska, after holding set points in the first set. Her next tournament was the Memphis International where she made the quarterfinals and lost to Alberta Brianti, in two sets.

After qualifying for the main draw at the 2012 Madrid Open, she recorded the biggest win of her career by defeating 2010 French Open champion and 11th seed Francesca Schiavone in three sets in the first round. After defeating Shahar Pe'er and Anabel Medina Garrigues, her run was ended in the quarterfinals by Agnieszka Radwańska. Nevertheless, she rose to a career-high No. 59.

She began the French Open with a three-set win over also unseeded Ksenia Pervak, before she upset 19th seed and former world No. 1, Jelena Janković. In round three, she defeated 14th seed 2010 French Open champion and defending finalist Francesca Schiavone, also in three sets. She lost in round four to fourth seed and 2011 Wimbledon Champion Petra Kvitová, 2–6, 1–6. However, it was a breakthrough tournament for Lepchenko as she had never advanced further than the second round of a Grand Slam tournament previously.

Her next tournament was the Wimbledon Championships, where she defeated Austrian Patricia Mayr-Achleitner, and in the second round, 31st seed and former top-15 player, Anastasia Pavlyuchenkova before she lost against defending champion, Petra Kvitová, 1–6, 0–6. She then advanced to the second round of the Carlsbad Open by defeating Nicole Gibbs, 6–3, 6–1. She lost in the quarterfinals to Nadia Petrova, 4–6, 6–2, 6–7.

Lepchenko reached the third round of the US Open, where she was defeated in straight sets by defending champion Samantha Stosur.

=== 2013: Second French Open third round ===
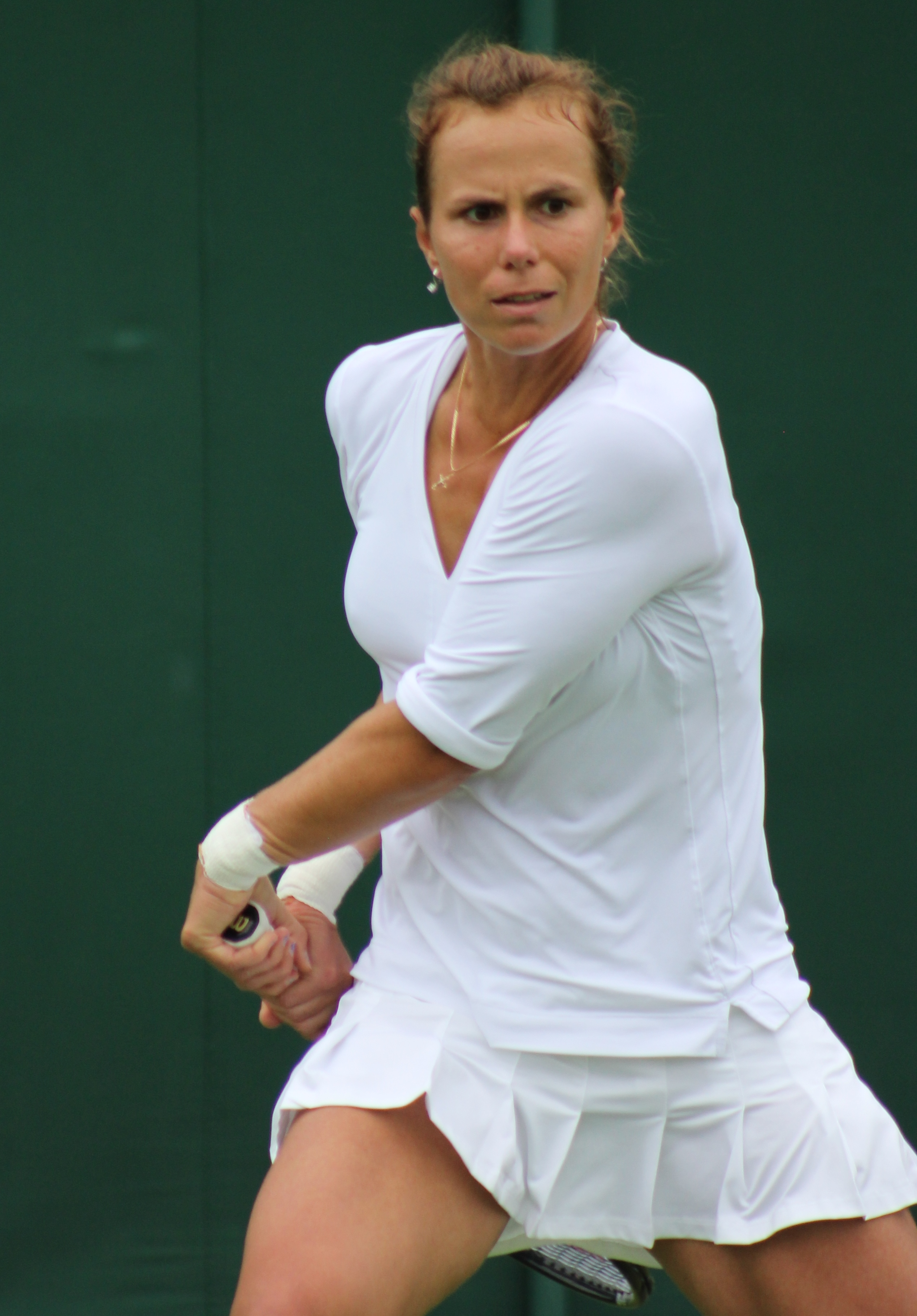
Lepchenko at the 2013 Wimbledon Championships

Lepchenko began the year by playing at the Brisbane International. She lost in the first round to third seed and eventual champion, Serena Williams. At the Sydney International, Lepchenko was defeated in the first round by Ekaterina Makarova. Seeded 21st at the Australian Open, she lost in the second round to Elena Vesnina. However, in doubles, she and her partner, Zheng Saisai, reached the semifinals where they lost to Australian wildcards Ashleigh Barty and Casey Dellacqua.

Playing in the Fed Cup tie against Italy, Lepchenko won both of her matches over Roberta Vinci and Sara Errani. However, Lepchenko's two wins were not enough as the USA fell to Italy 2-3. At the Qatar Open, she retired in her first-round match against Klára Zakopalová due to an upper respiratory illness. In Dubai, Lepchenko lost in the first round to Hsieh Su-wei. Seeded 22nd at Indian Wells, she received a bye into the second round where she was defeated by Lara Arruabarrena. Seeded 25th at the Miami Open, Lepchenko again received a bye to the second round, and defeated Irina-Camelia Begu before losing to fifth seed Li Na.

She began her clay-court season at the Charleston Open. Seeded 12th, she was defeated in the third round by fifth seed Venus Williams. Seeded sixth at the Portugal Open, Lepchenko lost in the first round to Svetlana Kuznetsova. At the Madrid Open, she upset 12th seed Roberta Vinci in the first round. After she was handed a walkover when Julia Görges withdrew due to illness, she was defeated in the third round by seventh seed Sara Errani, in two sets. At the Italian Open, Lepchenko lost in the second round to 12th seed Maria Kirilenko, 3–6, 1–6. Seeded No. 7 at the Brussels Open, Lepchenko advanced to the quarterfinals defeating Bojana Jovanovski and wildcard Elena Baltacha. She was defeated then by eventual champion Kaia Kanepi, in third set tie-breaker. Seeded 29 at the French Open, she reached the third round with wins over Mirjana Lučić-Baroni and Elina Svitolina. She lost there to eighth seed and last year quarterfinalist Angelique Kerber.

Lepchenko played only one grass-court tournament before Wimbledon. At the Eastbourne International, she lost in the first round to Heather Watson, in straight sets. Seeded 26 at Wimbledon, she was defeated by Czech qualifier Eva Birnerová, 6–2, 4–6, 6–4.

Lepchenko began US Open Series at the Stanford Classic. Seeded No. 6, and after beating qualifier Michelle Larcher de Brito and Tamira Paszek, she lost in the quarterfinals to top seed and eventual finalist, Agnieszka Radwańska. At the Carlsbad Open, she was defeated in the first round by fifth seed and eventual champion, Sam Stosur. At the Rogers Cup, Lepchenko lost in the second round to Magdaléna Rybáriková. At her final tournament before the US Open, the Cincinnati Open, she won over Flavia Pennetta, 6–2, 2–6, 6–2, and lost in the second round to fourth seed Agnieszka Radwańska, 4–6, 0–6. Ranked 35 at the US Open, Lepchenko was defeated in the first round by world No. 214, Alexandra Dulgheru in a close three-setter.

Seeded seventh at the Guangzhou International Open, Lepchenko was defeated in the first round by world No. 105, Tímea Babos, 7–6, 7–5. Lepchenko lost her first-round match at the Pan Pacific Open to Japanese wildcard Misaki Doi. She had her first win since Cincinnati at the China Open when she beat wildcard Heather Watson in the first round, 1–6, 6–3, 6–3. In the second round, she lost to ninth seed Petra Kvitová, 6–2, 2–6, 0–6. At the HP Open, Lepchenko lost in the first round to fifth seed and eventual finalist Eugenie Bouchard, 3–6, 0–6. She played her final tournament of the year at the Kremlin Cup where she lost in the first round to wildcard Alisa Kleybanova, in three sets.

Lepchenko ended the year ranked No. 53.

=== 2014: First WTA Tour final ===
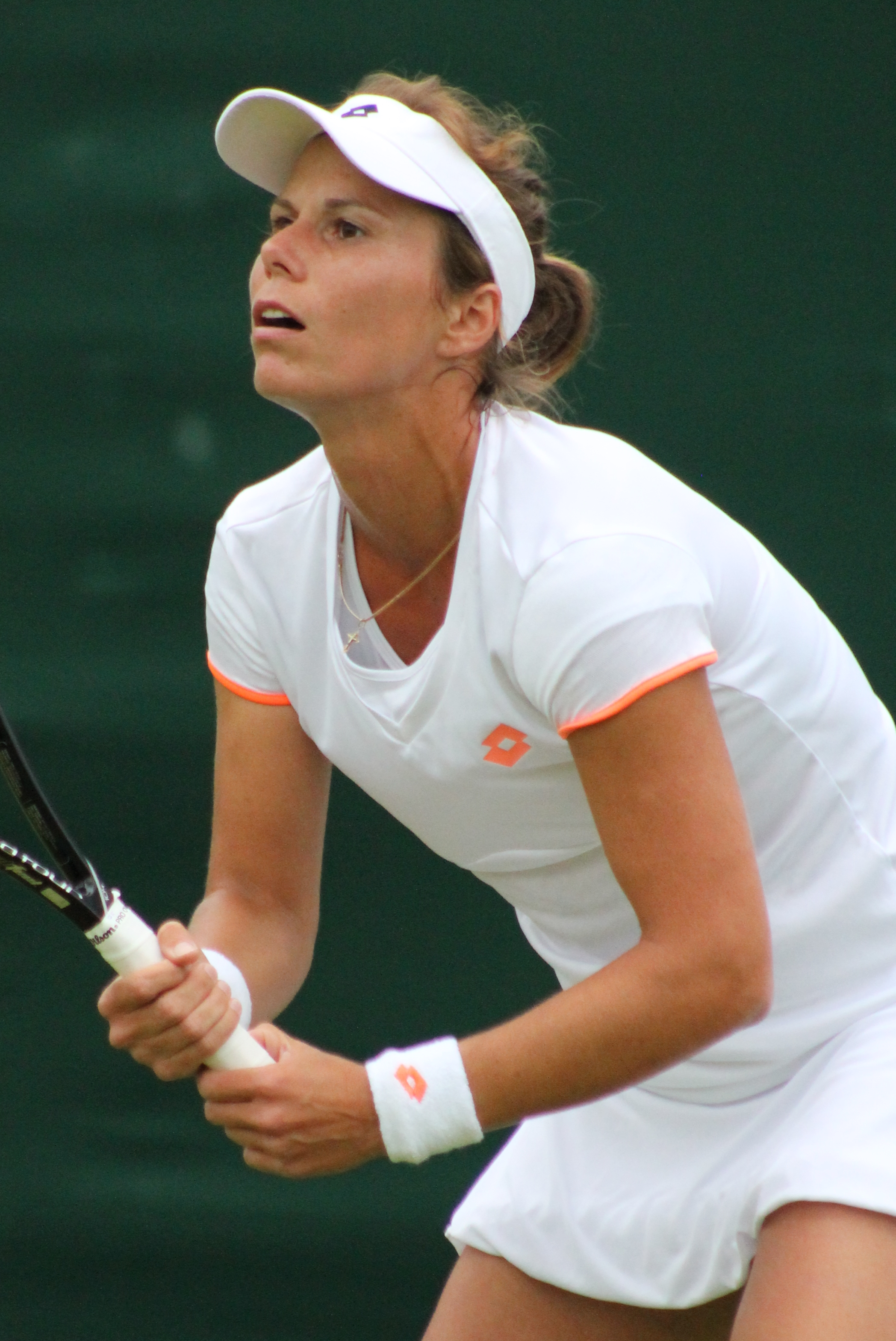
Lepchenko at the 2014 Wimbledon Championships

Lepchenko began new season at the Brisbane International where she lost in the first round to Elina Svitolina. In Sydney, Lepchenko was defeated in the final round of qualifying by compatriot Victoria Duval. However, due to her compatriot, Sloane Stephens, pulling out of the tournament due to a left wrist injury, Lepchenko got herself a lucky loser spot into the main draw. She beat Svetlana Kuznetsova in the first round. She was defeated in the second round by qualifier and eventual champion Tsvetana Pironkova. At the Australian Open, she lost in the second round to 11th seed Simona Halep.

In Doha, Lepchenko was defeated in the first round by Kaia Kanepi. At Dubai, she lost in the first round of qualifying to Maryna Zanevska. Playing in Indian Wells, Lepchenko reached the third round after wins over qualifier Alison Van Uytvanck and 29th seed Daniela Hantuchová. She was defeated in her third-round match by Lauren Davis. At the Miami Open, she stunned seventh seed Jelena Janković in the second round; Janković led 5–1 in the third set before Lepchenko made a comeback to win the match. She lost in the fourth round to 11th seed Caroline Wozniacki.

Lepchenko started her clay-court season at the Charleston Open. She was defeated in the first round by Petra Cetkovská. At Madrid, Lepchenko lost in the second round to fifth seed Petra Kvitová. Playing at the Italian Open, she was defeated in the third round by top seed, defending and eventual champion, Serena Williams. Competing at the French Open, she lost in the second round to eighth seed Angelique Kerber.

Beginning her grass-court season at the Birmingham Classic, Lepchenko was defeated in the second round by 16th seed Casey Dellacqua. At the Eastbourne International, she lost in the second round to second seed Petra Kvitová. At the Wimbledon Championships, Lepchenko beat 2010 Wimbledon semifinalist, Tsvetana Pironkova, in the first round before she was defeated by Caroline Garcia.

Lepchenko got her US Open Series underway at the Stanford Classic. She advanced to the semifinals defeating Caroline Garcia, second seed and last year finalist Agnieszka Radwańska, and qualifier and compatriot Sachia Vickery. She lost her semifinal match to third seed Angelique Kerber. Lepchenko was playing well against Kerber; after winning the first set, she led 5–2 in the second before Kerber came back to not only win the second set but also the match. Coming through qualifying at the Western & Southern Open, Lepchenko was defeated in the first round by Sam Stosur. In Connecticut, she lost in the first round of qualifying to Aleksandra Wozniak. At the US Open, she reached the third round where she was defeated by top seed, two-time defending champion, and eventual champion Serena Williams.

Seeded fifth at the Korea Open, and defeating Olivia Rogowska, Han Na-lae, top seed and defending champion, Agnieszka Radwańska, and Christina McHale, Lepchenko reached her first WTA Tour tournament final. However, she lost to second seed Karolína Plíšková, but after the tournament, her ranking improved from 43 to 35. At the China Open, Lepchenko was defeated in the final round of qualifying by Sílvia Soler Espinosa. Seeded fourth at the first edition of the Tianjin Open, Lepchenko made it to the quarterfinal round where she lost to sixth seed and eventual champion Alison Riske. Lepchenko competed in her final tournament of the year at the Luxembourg Open. Seeded fifth, she advanced to the quarterfinals after beating Julia Görges and Jana Čepelová. She was defeated in her quarterfinal match by qualifier Denisa Allertová.

Lepchenko ended the year ranked 36.

=== 2015 ===
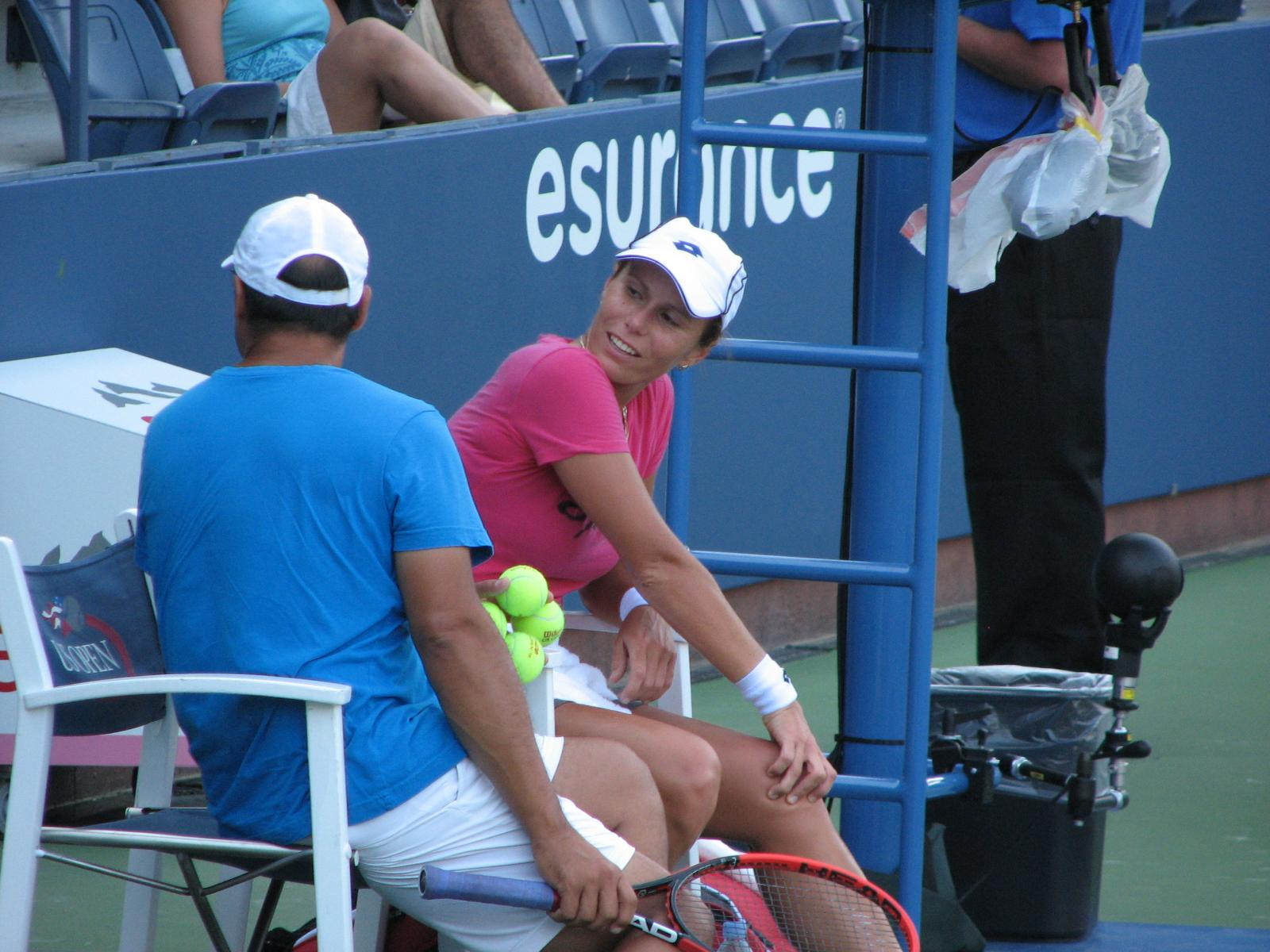
Lepchenko during the 2015 US Open

Lepchenko started new season at the Brisbane International. In the first round, she beat home crowd favorite Samantha Stosur, in three sets, and in the second round, compatriot Madison Keys, 6–4, 6–4. In the quarterfinals, she beat lucky loser Alla Kudryavtseva, 7–5, 7–5. In the semifinals, she lost to second seed Ana Ivanovic, 6–7, 4–6. Lepchenko twice served for the opening set but Ivanovic came back both times to win the first-set tiebreaker and eventually the match. Seeded 30 at the Australian Open, after beating Vitalia Diatchenko and Ajla Tomljanović, Lepchenko was defeated in the third round by sixth seed Agnieszka Radwańska, 6–0, 7–5.

Seeded top for qualifying at the Monterrey Open, Lepchenko lost in the first round of qualifying to Michelle Larcher de Brito 0–6, 1–6. Seeded 26 at Indian Wells, she was given a bye into the second round. She was defeated in the third round by third seed and eventual champion, Simona Halep. Seeded 28 at the Miami Open, after a first-round bye, she lost to Kaia Kanepi, 2–6, 4–6.

Lepchenko began her clay-court season at Charleston. Seeded 10, she retired down 2–6, 1–2 in her first-round match against Andreea Mitu due to a lower back injury. At the Madrid Open, Lepchenko lost in the second round to Barbora Strýcová. After qualifying for the Internationaux de Strasbourg, she lost in the first round to Lesia Tsurenko, 4–6, 6–7. Ranked 34 at the French Open, she was defeated in the first round by 16th seed and compatriot Madison Keys, 7–6, 6–3.

Lepchenko started her preparations for Wimbledon at the first edition of the Nottingham Open. As the third seed, she lost in the first round to eventual finalist Monica Niculescu, 6–4, 3–6, 1–6. At the Birmingham Classic, Lepchenko was defeated in the first round by 12th seed Victoria Azarenka, 7–6, 6–4. Playing at the Eastbourne International, she lost in the first round to Heather Watson, 6–7, 2–6. Ranked 40 at the Wimbledon Championships, Lepchenko was defeated in the first round by 20th seed and eventual finalist Garbiñe Muguruza, 6–4, 6–1.

In the US Open Series, she started the Stanford Classic off by beating Mirjana Lučić-Baroni in the first round, 3–6, 6–2, 7–6. In the second round, she stunned top seed Caroline Wozniacki, 6–4, 6–2. In the quarterfinals, Lepchenko defeated Mona Barthel, 6–7, 6–2, 6–3, to reach the semifinals for the second year in a row. However, she then lost to fourth seed Karolína Plíšková, 2–6, 5–7. At the Rogers Cup, she was defeated in the first round by Barbora Strýcová, 6–2, 6–4. Lepchenko played one more tournament before the US Open, which was at the Western & Southern Open. She reached the third round where she lost to qualifier Anna Karolína Schmiedlová. Ranked 46 at the US Open, Lepchenko advanced to the fourth round defeating Kirsten Flipkens, Lesia Tsurenko, and Mona Barthel. She was defeated in the fourth round by 20th seed Victoria Azarenka, 6–3, 6–4.

Seeded No. 4 at the Korea Open, Lepchenko lost in the second round to Elizaveta Kulichkova, 0–6, 2–6. At the Wuhan Open, she was defeated in the second round by 12th seed Elina Svitolina, 6–4, 6–2. Staying in China to play at Beijing, she lost in the first round to Chinese wildcard Wang Qiang, 2–6, 6–3, 2–6. At the Generali Ladies Linz, Lepchenko lost in the first round to Kirsten Flipkens, 3–6, 6–7. She competed in her final tournament of the year at the Kremlin Cup and was defeated in the first round by Margarita Gasparyan, 7–5, 7–6.

Lepchenko ended the year ranked No. 46.

=== 2016 ===
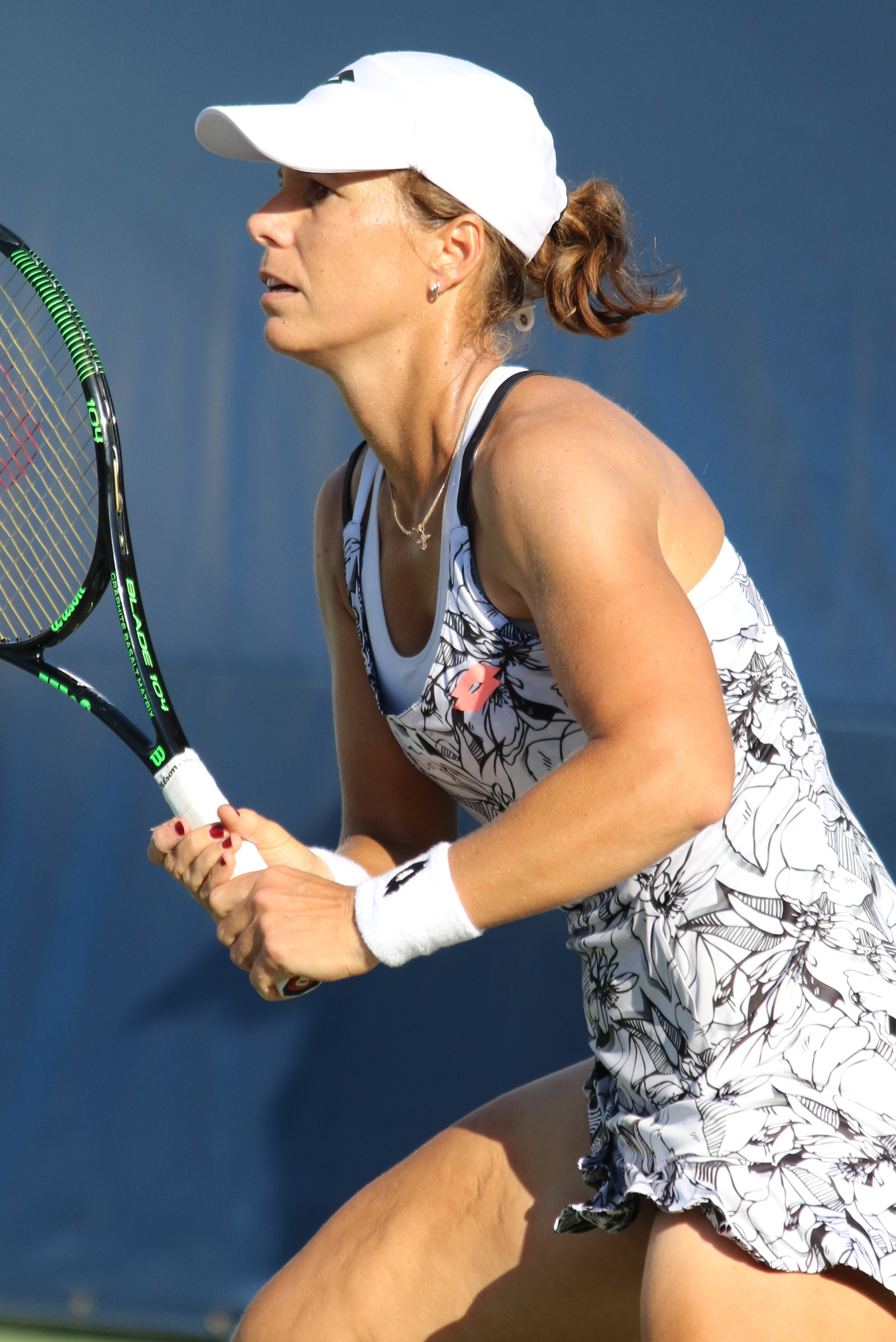
Lepchenko at the 2016 US Open

Lepchenko began 2016 season at the Brisbane International where she reached the quarterfinal round losing to sixth seed, Carla Suárez Navarro. At the Australian Open, Lepchenko won her first two matches over 31st seed Lesia Tsurenko and Lara Arruabarrena. She was defeated in the third round by qualifier Zhang Shuai.

At the Dubai Championships, Lepchenko lost in the final round of qualifying to Zheng Saisai. In Doha at the Qatar Ladies Open, she was defeated in the first round by Zheng Saisai. Lepchenko then missed the next two months from tour citing a knee injury.

Lepchenko returned to action in May at the Italian Open. She lost in the final round of qualifying to Kiki Bertens. Before the French Open, Lepchenko competed at the Nürnberger Versicherungscup. She advanced to the quarterfinal round by beating German wildcard Katharina Hobgarski and fifth seed Sabine Lisicki. She was defeated in her quarterfinal match by eventual finalist, Mariana Duque Mariño. At the French Open, Lepchenko lost in the first round to 27th seed Ekaterina Makarova.

Seeded second at the Bol Open, Lepchenko was defeated in the second round by eventual champion Mandy Minella.

She started her grass-court season at the Rosmalen Open where she lost in the second round to top seed Belinda Bencic. At the Birmingham Classic, Lepchenko was defeated in the first round of qualifying by Laura Robson. Getting past qualifying in Eastbourne, Lepchenko lost in the first round to Eugenie Bouchard. At Wimbledon, Lepchenko was defeated in the second round by fourth seed and eventual finalist, Angelique Kerber.

Lepchenko started her preparation for the US Open at the Silicon Valley Classic. Seeded eighth, she lost in the first round to Alison Riske. At the Canadian Open, Lepchenko fell in the final round of qualifying to Alla Kudryavtseva. However, due to Garbiñe Muguruza pulling out of the tournament due to gastrointestinal illness, Lepchenko not only got a lucky loser spot into the main draw, but she also got a bye to the second round. She beat qualifier Naomi Broady in her second-round match; she was defeated in the third round by 15th seed Johanna Konta. In Cincinnati at the Western & Southern Open, Lepchenko lost in the first round of qualifying to Donna Vekić. At the Connecticut Open, Lepchenko was defeated in the second round of qualifying by Johanna Larsson. Playing in New York at the US Open, Lepchenko reached the third round after beating Peng Shuai and 15th seed Timea Bacsinszky. She lost her third-round match to Ana Konjuh.

Playing in Tokyo at the Japan Women's Open, Lepchenko reached the quarterfinal round where she was defeated by sixth seed Zhang Shuai. She stayed in Tokyo to compete at the Pan Pacific Open where she lost in the first round to Olympic gold medalist Monica Puig. At the Wuhan Open, Lepchenko was defeated in the first round by Lucie Šafářová. In Beijing at the China Open, Lepchenko lost in the final round of qualifying to Kateřina Siniaková. At the Hong Kong Open, she was defeated in the first round by Alizé Cornet. Lepchenko played her final tournament of the season at the Luxembourg Open where she lost in the second round to top seed and eventual finalist Petra Kvitová.

Lepchenko ended the year ranked 87.

=== 2017 ===
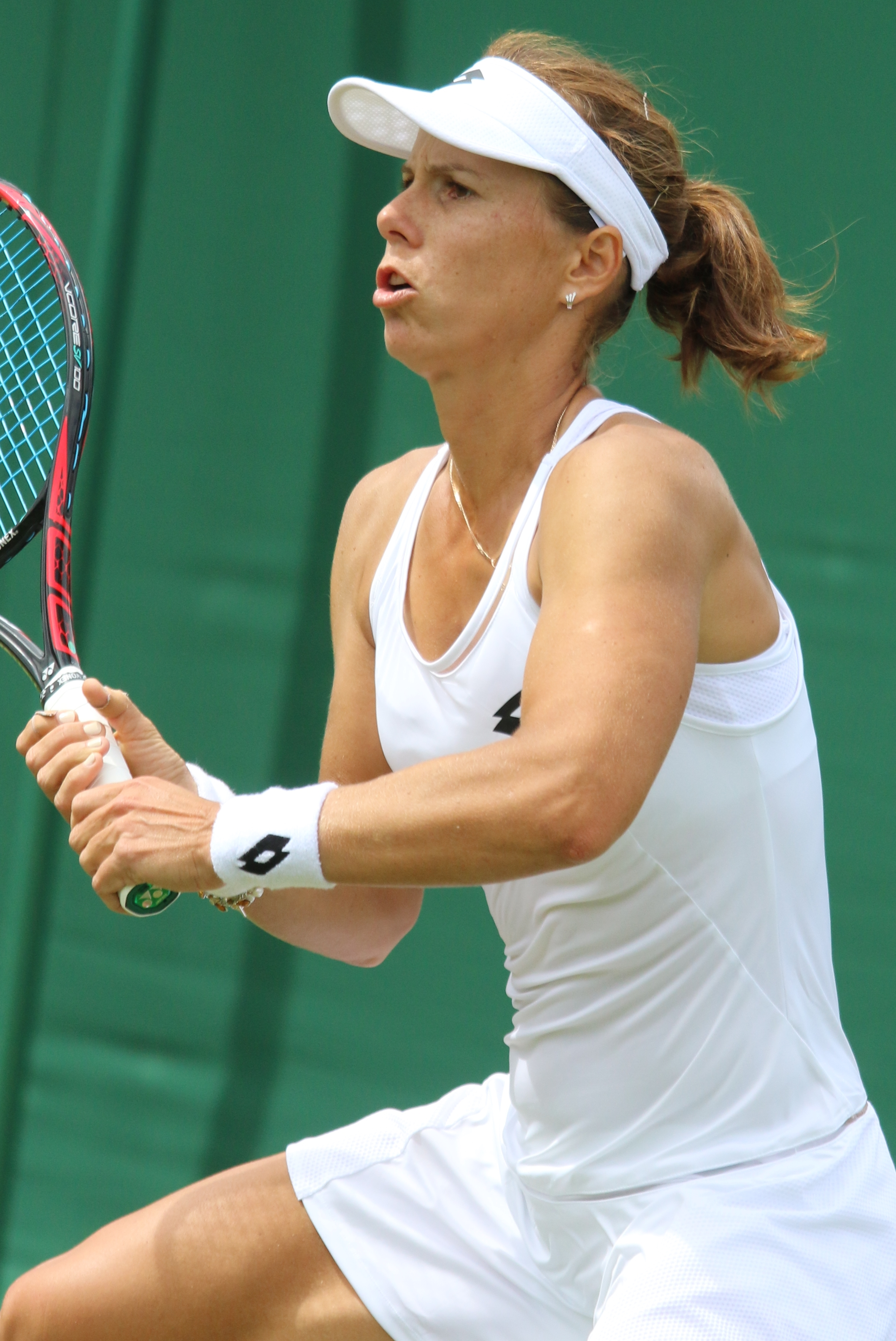
Lepchenko at the 2017 Wimbledon Championships

She commenced her 2017 season at the Auckland Open where she lost in the second round to third seed Caroline Wozniacki. At the Sydney International, Lepchenko was defeated in the first round of qualifying by Duan Yingying. At the Australian Open, she upset 19th seed Kiki Bertens in the first round. In the second round, she lost in a three-set thriller to Duan Yingying.

Seeded second at the Midland Tennis Classic, Lepchenko made it to the quarterfinal round where she was defeated by Canadian qualifier Katherine Sebov. At the Mexican Open, she lost in the first round to second seed and eventual finalist Kristina Mladenovic. Coming through qualifying at the Indian Wells Open, Lepchenko was defeated in the second round by 25th seed Tímea Babos. Getting past qualifying at the Miami Open, she lost in the second round to 12th seed and eventual finalist Caroline Wozniacki.

Beginning her clay-court season at the Charleston Open, Lepchenko was defeated in the first round by 15th seed Lucie Šafářová. In Germany at the Porsche Tennis Grand Prix, she lost in the first round of qualifying to Evgeniya Rodina. Competing in Morocco at Rabat, Lepchenko advanced to the semifinal round where she was defeated by eventual finalist Francesca Schiavone. At the Italian Open, she lost in the final round of qualifying to Mona Barthel. Lepchenko played her final tournament before the French Open at the Nürnberger Versicherungscup where she was defeated in the second round by Sorana Cîrstea. At the French Open, Lepchenko lost in the second round to 14th seed Elena Vesnina.

She began her preparation for Wimbledon at the Rosmalen Open where she was defeated in the first round by Camila Giorgi. Playing in Spain at the Mallorca Open, Lepchenko lost in the second round to second seed and eventual champion Anastasija Sevastova. She played her final tournament before Wimbledon at the Eastbourne International. Making it past qualifying, she was defeated in the first round by Zhang Shuai. At Wimbledon, Lepchenko beat 28th seed Lauren Davis in her first-round match. In the second round, she lost to qualifier Polona Hercog.

Coming through qualifying at the Canadian Open, Lepchenko stunned 12th seed and French Open champion Jeļena Ostapenko in the first round. She was defeated in the second round by Caroline Garcia. Despite qualifying for the Western & Southern Open, Lepchenko lost in the first round to fellow qualifier Ashleigh Barty. At the Connecticut Open, she was defeated in the second round of qualifying by Carina Witthöft. At the US Open, she lost in the first round to third seed and Wimbledon champion Garbiñe Muguruza.

Seeded fifth at the Tournoi de Québec, Lepchenko was defeated in the second round by Canadian Françoise Abanda. Making it past the qualifying rounds at the Wuhan Open, Lepchenko upset tenth seed and US Open finalist Madison Keys in the first round. She lost in the third round to Alizé Cornet. Sliding past qualifying at the China Open in Beijing, Lepchenko was defeated in the second round by 12th seed Petra Kvitová. At the Upper Austria Ladies Linz, Lepchenko lost in the second round to Johanna Larsson. Lepchenko's final tournament of the season was the Luxembourg Open. Seeded eighth, she was defeated there in the first round by eventual champion Carina Witthöft.

Lepchenko ended the year ranked 62.

=== 2019 ===
Lepchenko started new season at the Brisbane International where she lost in the first round of qualifying to Dayana Yastremska. Coming through qualifying at the Australian Open, she was defeated in the first round by fellow qualifier Natalia Vikhlyantseva.

Seeded 15th at the Newport Beach Challenger, Lepchenko lost in the second round to Lauren Davis. At the Qatar Ladies Open, she was defeated in the first round of qualifying by Tereza Mrdeža.

=== 2020 ===
Lepchenko began season at the Auckland Open. Coming through qualifying, she lost in the first round to 2017 champion Lauren Davis. At the Australian Open, she was defeated in the second round of qualifying by Barbora Krejčíková.

Seeded 16th at the Newport Beach Challenger, Lepchenko lost in the second round to Dalma Gálfi. At the Mexican Open, she was defeated in the final round of qualifying by Canadian wildcard Leylah Fernandez. Playing at the Indian Wells Challenger, Lepchenko lost in the first round to qualifier Asia Muhammad.

=== 2021: 21 months provisional doping ban ===
Lepchenko won her first WTA 125 title at the Charleston 125 Open, defeating Jamie Loeb in the final in three sets.

From August 2021 when she lost a second-round match at the Thoreau Tennis Open to Vera Zvonareva, Lepchenko was inactive until May 2023, due to a 21 months provisional doping suspension, after testing positive for a banned stimulant, a couple of months after the 2021 French Open.

=== 2023–2026: Comeback, first WTA Tour quarterfinal in eight years ===
After her suspension had ended, she then started her comeback at a W15 tournament in Spain. At the end of 2023, she had a singles ranking of No. 318.

Ranked No. 199 at the 2024 US Open, she qualified for the main draw and made the second round of a major in more than three years after the retirement of Brenda Fruhvirtová, before losing to Anastasia Potapova. She qualified for the newly upgraded WTA 500 Korea Open, losing to seventh seed Ekaterina Alexandrova in the first round.

In March 2025, Lepchenko qualified for the main-draw at the WTA 1000 tournament in Indian Wells, but was eliminated in the first round by lucky loser Sonay Kartal. She was runner-up at the WTA 125 Argentina Open in November 2025, losing to Panna Udvardy in the final.

At the 2026 Copa Colsanitas, wins over qualifier Lia Karatancheva and second seed Jéssica Bouzas Maneiro saw Lepchenko reach her first WTA Tour quarterfinal in eight years, which she lost to Emiliana Arango in straight sets.

== Personal life ==
In September 2007, Lepchenko became a U.S. citizen. She and her family, whose Russian–Ukrainian heritage allegedly made them a target of persecution in their homeland, were granted political asylum by the United States. They had lived in the U.S. for more than five years when Lepchenko began representing the United States in WTA and ITF tournaments, later also at the 2012 Summer Olympics.

Lepchenko resides in Allentown, Pennsylvania. She is a Christian and a member of the Orthodox Church.

== Performance timelines ==
Key
W	F	SF	QF	#R	RR	Q#	P#	DNQ	A	Z#	PO	G	S	B	NMS	NTI	P	NH

(W) winner; (F) finalist; (SF) semifinalist; (QF) quarterfinalist; (#R) rounds 4, 3, 2, 1; (RR) round-robin stage; (Q#) qualification round; (P#) preliminary round; (DNQ) did not qualify; (A) absent; (Z#) Davis/Fed Cup Zonal Group (with number indication) or (PO) play-off; (G) gold, (S) silver or (B) bronze Olympic/Paralympic medal; (NMS) not a Masters tournament; (NTI) not a Tier I tournament; (P) postponed; (NH) not held; (SR) strike rate (events won / competed); (W–L) win–loss record.
To avoid confusion and double counting, these charts are updated at the conclusion of a tournament or when the player's participation has ended.

=== Singles ===
Tournament	2004	2005	2006	2007	2008	2009	2010	2011	2012	2013	2014	2015	2016	2017	2018	2019	2020	2021	...	2024	SR	W–L
Grand Slam tournaments
Australian Open	A	A	Q2	1R	A	Q3	1R	1R	1R	2R	2R	3R	3R	2R	1R	1R	Q2	Q3		A	0 / 11	7–11
French Open	A	A	A	1R	Q1	1R	2R	2R	4R	3R	2R	1R	1R	2R	1R	1R	1R	2R		A	0 / 14	10–14
Wimbledon	A	A	A	1R	Q1	Q2	2R	1R	3R	1R	2R	1R	2R	2R	1R	Q2	NH	Q3		Q2	0 / 10	6–10
US Open	A	A	2R	Q2	Q2	1R	Q2	1R	3R	1R	3R	4R	3R	1R	A	1R	A	A		2R	0 / 11	11–11
Win–loss	0–0	0–0	1–1	0–3	0–0	0–2	2–3	1–4	7–4	3–4	5–4	5–4	5–4	3–4	0–3	0–3	0–1	1–1		1–1	0 / 46	34–46
National representation
Summer Olympics	A	Not Held			A	Not Held			2R	Not Held			A	Not Held				A			0 / 1	1–1
WTA 1000
Dubai / Qatar Open	Not Tier I				A	A	A	A	3R	1R	1R	A	1R	A	A	A	A	A			0 / 4	2–4
Indian Wells Open	A	A	Q2	Q2	Q1	1R	Q2	1R	2R	2R	3R	3R	A	2R	1R	Q1	NH	A			0 / 8	5–8
Miami Open	Q1	A	1R	1R	A	Q1	1R	2R	Q2	3R	4R	2R	A	2R	2R	A	NH	A			0 / 9	7–9
Madrid Open	Not Held					2R	Q1	Q2	QF	3R	2R	2R	A	A	A	A	NH	A			0 / 5	7–5
Italian Open	A	A	A	A	A	Q1	1R	1R	Q2	2R	3R	1R	Q2	Q2	Q1	A	A	A			0 / 5	3–5
Canadian Open	A	A	1R	1R	1R	A	Q1	A	3R	2R	A	1R	3R	2R	A	Q2	NH	A			0 / 8	5–8
Cincinnati Open	Not Tier I					Q2	Q2	Q1	1R	2R	1R	3R	Q1	1R	1R	A	A	A			0 / 6	3–6
Pan Pacific / Wuhan Open	A	A	A	A	A	A	A	A	A	1R	A	2R	1R	3R	A	A	NH				0 / 4	3–4
China Open	Not Tier I					A	A	A	2R	2R	Q2	1R	Q2	2R	Q1	A	NH				0 / 4	3–4

=== Doubles ===
Tournament	2007	2011	2012	2013	2014	2015	2016	2017	2018	W–L
Australian Open	1R	1R	A	SF	2R	1R	2R	A	2R	7–7
French Open	A	1R	1R	QF	1R	2R	1R	1R	A	4–7
Wimbledon	A	1R	2R	2R	1R	1R	1R	1R	A	2–7
US Open	A	1R	1R	2R	2R	1R	1R	1R	1R	2–8
Win–loss	0–1	0–4	1–3	9–4	2–4	1–4	1−4	0−3	1–2	15–29

== WTA Tour finals ==
=== Singles: 1 (runner-up) ===
Legend Premier International (0–1)	Finals by surface Hard (0–1) Clay (0–0)

Result	Date	Tournament	Tier	Surface	Opponent	Score
Loss	Sep 2014	Korea Open, South Korea	International	Hard	(Czech Republic) Karolína Plíšková	3–6, 7–6^{(7–5)}, 2–6

== WTA 125 finals ==
=== Singles: 2 (1 title, 1 runner-up) ===
Result	W–L	Date	Tournament	Surface	Opponent	Score
Win	1–0	Aug 2021	Charleston Pro, United States	Clay	(United States) Jamie Loeb	7–6^{(7–4)}, 4–6, 6–4
Loss	1–1	Nov 2025	Buenos Aires Open, Argentina	Clay	(Hungary) Panna Udvardy	3–6, 5–7

=== Doubles: 1 (runner-up) ===
Result	W–L	Date	Tournament	Surface	Partner	Opponents	Score
Loss	0–1	Nov 2025	Querétaro Open, Mexico	Clay	(Mexico) Marian Gómez Pezuela	(Spain) Alicia Herrero Liñana (Ukraine) Valeriya Strakhova	5–7, 2–6

== ITF Circuit finals ==
=== Singles: 25 (13 titles, 14 runner-ups) ===
Legend
$100,000 tournaments
$75/80,000 tournaments
$50,000 tournaments
$25,000 tournaments
$10,000 tournaments

Result	W–L	Date	Tournament	Tier	Surface	Opponent	Score
Loss	0–1	Jul 2002	ITF Harrisonburg, United States	10,000	Hard	(Puerto Rico) Vilmarie Castellvi	2–6, 0–6
Loss	0–2	May 2004	ITF Houston, United States	10,000	Hard	Cory Ann Avants	1–6, 4–6
Loss	0–3	Jun 2004	ITF Allentown, United States	25,000	Hard	Diana Ospina	4–6, 2–6
Loss	0–4	Apr 2005	ITF Tunica Resorts, United States	25,000	Hard	(Romania) Edina Gallovits	3–6, 6–4, 3–6
Win	1–4	Apr 2005	ITF Jackson, United States	25,000	Clay	Ahsha Rolle	6–3, 6–2
Loss	1–5	Apr 2005	Dothan Pro Classic, United States	75,000	Clay	(Venezuela) Milagros Sequera	6–2, 2–6, 4–6
Loss	1–6	May 2005	Charlottesville Open, United States	50,000	Clay	Carly Gullickson	6–4, 6–4
Win	2–6	Jun 2005	ITF Allentown, United States	25,000	Hard	Lindsay Lee-Waters	7–6^{(3)}, 6–4
Loss	2–7	Apr 2006	Dothan Pro Classic, United States	75,000	Clay	(Ukraine) Yuliana Fedak	6–4, 4–6, 2–6
Win	3–7	Jun 2006	ITF Allentown, United States	25,000	Hard	Carly Gullickson	6–1, 6–4
Win	4–7	Jul 2006	ITF College Park, United States	75,000	Hard	(France) Camille Pin	6–3, 7–5
Win	5–7	Jul 2007	ITF Boston, United States	50,000	Hard	(Republic of Ireland) Kelly Liggan	6–2, 5–7, 5–0 ret.
Loss	5–8	Sep 2007	Ashland Tennis Classic, United States	50,000	Hard	(Hungary) Melinda Czink	1–6, 6–2, 4–6
Loss	5–9	Apr 2008	Dothan Pro Classic, United States	75,000	Clay	Bethanie Mattek	2–6, 6–7^{(3)}
Win	6–9	Sep 2008	Ashland Tennis Classic, United States	50,000	Hard	Carly Gullickson	5–7, 6–0, 6–2
Loss	6–10	Oct 2008	ITF Pittsburgh, United States	50,000	Hard	(Hungary) Melinda Czink	2–6, 6–3, 1–6
Loss	6–11	Jun 2009	Internazionali di Cuneo, Italy	100.000	Clay	(Slovenia) Polona Hercog	1–6, 2–6
Win	7–11	Nov 2009	ITF Phoenix, United States	50,000	Hard	(New Zealand) Sacha Jones	6–0, 6–0
Win	8–11	Sep 2010	Las Vegas Open, United States	50,000	Hard	(Romania) Sorana Cîrstea	6–2, 6–2
Win	9–11	Nov 2010	Grapevine Classic, United States	50,000	Hard	Jamie Hampton	7–6^{(1)}, 6–4
Win	10–11	Nov 2010	ITF Phoenix, United States	75,000	Hard	Melanie Oudin	6–3, 7–6^{(5)}
Win	11–11	Oct 2011	ITF Kansas City, United States	50,000	Hard	(Italy) Romina Oprandi	6–4, 6–1
Loss	11–12	Oct 2011	Classic of Troy, United States	50,000	Hard	(Italy) Romina Oprandi	1–6, 2–6
Win	12–12	Oct 2018	Tennis Classic of Macon, United States	80,000	Hard	(Paraguay) Verónica Cepede Royg	6–4, 6–4
Win	13–12	Feb 2021	ITF Boca Raton, United States	W25	Hard	(United States) Claire Liu	3–6, 6–4, 6–0
Loss	13–13	Jun 2024	Internazionali di Brescia, Italy	W75	Clay	(Ukraine) Katarina Zavatska	2–6, 3–6
Loss	13–14	Jul 2024	ITF Roma, Italy	W35	Clay	(Italy) Nuria Brancaccio	6–7^{(6)}, 1–6

=== Doubles: 11 (1 title, 10 runner-ups) ===
Result	W–L	Date	Tournament	Tier	Surface	Partner	Opponents	Score
Loss	0–1	Apr 2003	Dothan Pro Classic, United States	75,000	Clay	Julie Ditty	(Venezuela) Milagros Sequera (Australia) Christina Wheeler	7–5, 1–6, 2–6
Win	1–1	May 2004	ITF Hilton Head, United States	10,000	Hard	Cory Ann Avants	Tanner Cochran (Australia) Jaslyn Hewitt	6–2, 3–6, 6–3
Loss	1–2	Jun 2004	ITF Allentown, United States	25,000	Hard	Cory Ann Avants	Angela Haynes (United States) Diana Ospina	0–6, 2–6
Loss	1–3	Apr 2005	ITF Tunica Resorts, United States	25,000	Clay	(Romania) Edina Gallovits	(Belarus) Tatiana Poutchek (Russia) Anastasia Rodionova	2–6, 4–6
Loss	1–4	Apr 2006	Dothan Pro Classic, United States	75,000	Clay	(Romania) Edina Gallovits	(Australia) Monique Adamczak (Argentina) Soledad Esperón	4–6, 6–3, 4–6
Loss	1–5	Jul 2006	Lexington Challenger, United States	50,000	Hard	(Uzbekistan) Akgul Amanmuradova	(Chinese Taipei) Chan Chin-wei; Abigail Spears	1–6, 1–6
Loss	1–6	Jul 2006	ITF Washington, United States	75,000	Hard	(Uzbekistan) Akgul Amanmuradova	(Chinese Taipei) Chan Chin-wei (Ukraine) Tetiana Luzhanska	2–6, 6–1, 0–6
Loss	1–7	Sep 2007	ITF Albuquerque, United States	75,000	Hard	(Latvia) Līga Dekmeijere	(Hungary) Melinda Czink; Angela Haynes	5–7, 4–6
Loss	1–8	Jul 2008	ITF Boston, United States	50,000	Hard	(France) Yulia Fedossova	(Chinese Taipei) Chan Chin-wei (South Africa) Natalie Grandin	4–6, 3–6
Loss	1–9	Sep 2011	Las Vegas Open, United States	50,000	Hard	Melanie Oudin	Alexa Glatch (United States) Mashona Washington	4–6, 2–6
Loss	1–10	Oct 2011	Classic of Troy, United States	50,000	Hard	Mashona Washington	(Russia) Elena Bovina (Russia) Valeria Savinykh	6–7^{(6)}, 3–6
