= 2006 Guangzhou International Women's Open – Doubles =

Tennis event

Doubles
- 2006 Guangzhou International Women's Open

Final
- Champions: (China) Li Ting (China) Sun Tiantian
- Runners-up: (United States) Vania King (Croatia) Jelena Kostanić
- Score: 6–4, 2–6, 7–5

Details
- Draw: 16 (1WC/1Q)
- Seeds: 4

Events
Singles	Doubles
← 2005 ·	Guangzhou International Women's Open	· 2007 →

Maria Elena Camerin and Emmanuelle Gagliardi were the defending champions, but chose to compete in Luxembourg at the same week.

Li Ting and Sun Tiantian won the title by defeating Vania King and Jelena Kostanić 6–4, 2–6, 7–5 in the final.

== Seeds ==
1. (Spain) Anabel Medina Garrigues / (China) Yan Zi (semifinals)
2. (China) Li Ting / (China) Sun Tiantian (champions)
3. (Serbia and Montenegro) Jelena Janković / (China) Li Na (semifinals, withdrew due to a right shoulder injury on Li)
4. (Spain) Lourdes Domínguez Lino / (Spain) María José Martínez Sánchez (first round, withdrew due to a heat illness on Domínguez Lino)

== Draw ==
=== Key ===
- Q = Qualifier
- WC = Wild card
- LL = Lucky loser
- Alt = Alternate
- SE = Special exempt
- PR = Protected ranking
- ITF = ITF entry
- JE = Junior exempt
- w/o = Walkover
- r = Retired
- d = Defaulted
- SR = Special ranking

=== Draw ===
First round
1	(Spain) A Medina Garrigues (China) Z Yan	6	6
(China) J Hao (China) Y Xie	0	3
WC	(China) Dong Nan (China) Shao Shitong	1	3
Q	(China) L Huang (China) Jia Yuan	6	6
4	(Spain) L Domínguez Lino (Spain) MJ Martínez Sánchez
(United States) V King (Croatia) J Kostanić	w	/	o
(China) Y Chen (China) S Song	6	3	6
(Russia) A Chakvetadze (Russia) E Vesnina	2	6	2
(China) C Ji (China) S Sun	6	7^{7}
(Chinese Taipei) C-w Chan (Belarus) A Yakimova	3	6^{1}
(Australia) A Molik (United States) M Shaughnessy	2	3
3	(Serbia and Montenegro) J Janković (China) N Li	6	6
(Russia) A Jidkova (Russia) G Voskoboeva	6	6
(China) J Ren (China) S Zhang	4	3
(Netherlands) K Kilsdonk (Netherlands) E Tamaëla	3	4
2	(China) T Li (China) T Sun	6	6

Quarterfinals
1	(Spain) A Medina Garrigues (China) Z Yan	6	6
Q	(China) L Huang (China) Jia Yuan	0	2
(United States) V King (Croatia) J Kostanić	6	6
(China) Y Chen (China) S Song	4	4
(China) C Ji (China) S Sun
3	(Serbia and Montenegro) J Janković (China) N Li	w	/	o
(Russia) A Jidkova (Russia) G Voskoboeva
2	(China) T Li (China) T Sun	w	/	o

Semifinals
1	(Spain) A Medina Garrigues (China) Z Yan	4	0
(United States) V King (Croatia) J Kostanić	6	6
3	(Serbia and Montenegro) J Janković (China) N Li
2	(China) T Li (China) T Sun	w	/	o

Final
(United States) V King (Croatia) J Kostanić	4	6	5
2	(China) T Li (China) T Sun	6	2	7
