= 2004 Guangzhou International Women's Open – Singles =

Singles
- 2004 Guangzhou International Women's Open

Final
- Champion: (China) Li Na
- Runner-up: (Slovakia) Martina Suchá
- Score: 6–3, 6–4

Details
- Draw: 30 (2WC/4Q)
- Seeds: 8

Events
Singles	Doubles
- Guangzhou International Women's Open

Li Na defeated Martina Suchá in the final, 6–3, 6–4 to win the inaugural singles tennis title at the 2004 Guangzhou International Women's Open. It was her first WTA Tour singles title (won as a qualifier), becoming the first Chinese player to win a WTA Tour singles title.

== Seeds ==
1. (Argentina) Gisela Dulko (second round)
2. (Serbia and Montenegro) Jelena Janković (second round)
3. (Italy) Flavia Pennetta (second round, retired due to a left wrist sprain)
4. (France) Marion Bartoli (second round)
5. (Venezuela) María Vento-Kabchi (first round)
6. (Puerto Rico) Kristina Brandi (quarterfinals)
7. (Australia) Nicole Pratt (second round)
8. (Czech Republic) Klára Koukalová (second round)

== Draw ==
Key

- Q = Qualifier
- WC = Wild card
- LL = Lucky loser
- Alt = Alternate
- ITF = ITF entry
- PR = Protected ranking
- SR = Special ranking
- SE = Special exempt
- JE = Junior exempt
- JR = Junior Accelerator Programme entrant
- CO = College Accelerator Programme entrant
- NG = Next Gen Accelerator Program entrant
- w/o = Walkover
- r = Retired
- d = Defaulted

=== Finals ===
Semifinals
(Czech Republic) Barbora Strýcová	2	5
(Slovakia) Martina Suchá	6	7
WC	(China) Li Ting	3	3
Q	(China) Li Na	6	6

Final
(Slovakia) Martina Suchá	3	4
Q	(China) Li Na	6	6

=== Top half ===
First round
(Argentina) M Díaz Oliva	1	2
(Russia) D Safina	6	6
(Czech Republic) S Kleinová	2	1
(Czech Republic) B Strýcová	6	6
(China) J Zheng	6	6
5	(Venezuela) M Vento-Kabchi	2	0
3	(Italy) F Pennetta	6	2	6
WC	(China) Z Yan	1	6	3
(United States) J Craybas	2	5
(Thailand) T Tanasugarn	6	7
(Slovakia) M Suchá	6	1	6
(Russia) A Jidkova	4	6	3
(China) T Sun	6	6^{5}	1
8	(Czech Republic) K Koukalová	0	7	6

Second round
1	(Argentina) G Dulko	1	4
(Russia) D Safina	6	6
(Czech Republic) B Strýcová	6	7
(China) J Zheng	2	5
3	(Italy) F Pennetta	5	0	r
(Thailand) T Tanasugarn	7	3
(Slovakia) M Suchá	7	6
8	(Czech Republic) K Koukalová	6^{4}	4

Quarterfinals
(Russia) D Safina	4	1
(Czech Republic) B Strýcová	6	6
(Thailand) T Tanasugarn	6^{7}	5
(Slovakia) M Suchá	7	7

Semifinals
(Czech Republic) B Strýcová	2	5
(Slovakia) M Suchá	6	7

=== Bottom half ===
First round
7	(Australia) N Pratt	6	6
(Japan) A Morigami	3	4
(Hungary) A Kapros	1	1
WC	(China) T Li	6	6
(China) S Peng	6	6
Q	(South Africa) N Grandin	0	3
(United States) J Hopkins	0	4
4	(France) M Bartoli	6	6
6	(Puerto Rico) K Brandi	7	6
Q	(China) N Liu	6^{4}	3
Q	(Russia) N Bratchikova	6	0	3
(Russia) T Panova	3	6	6
Q	(China) N Li	6	6
(Russia) V Dushevina	4	1

Second round
7	(Australia) N Pratt	2	0
WC	(China) T Li	6	6
(China) S Peng	6	6
4	(France) M Bartoli	1	0
6	(Puerto Rico) K Brandi	6	6
(Russia) T Panova	0	1
Q	(China) N Li	0	6	7
2	(Serbia and Montenegro) J Janković	6	2	6^{6}

Quarterfinals
WC	(China) T Li	6	6
(China) S Peng	2	2
6	(Puerto Rico) K Brandi	4	0
Q	(China) N Li	6	6

Semifinals
WC	(China) T Li	3	3
Q	(China) N Li	6	6

== Qualifying ==
=== Seeds ===
1. (China) Sun Tiantian (moved to the main draw)
2. (Japan) Aiko Nakamura (qualifying competition)
3. (South Africa) Natalie Grandin (Advanced to the main draw)
4. (China) Liu Nannan (Advanced to the main draw)
5. (Thailand) Suchanun Viratprasert (qualifying competition)
6. (China) Li Na (Advanced to the main draw)
7. (China) Xie Yan-ze (first round)
8. (Germany) Antonia Matic (second round)
9. (Russia) Nina Bratchikova (Advanced to the main draw)

=== Qualifiers ===
1. (Russia) Nina Bratchikova
2. (China) Li Na
3. (South Africa) Natalie Grandin
4. (China) Liu Nannan

=== Qualifying draw ===
==== First qualifier ====
First round
(China) Wu Wen-hao	0	4
(China) Yang Shu-jing	6	6
(China) Sun Shengnan	6	7
(New Zealand) Leanne Baker	4	6^{1}
WC	(China) Huang Chu-xian	1	1
5	(Thailand) Suchanun Viratprasert	6	6

Second round
9	(Russia) Nina Bratchikova	6	6
(China) Yang Shu-jing	3	2
(China) Sun Shengnan	4	5
5	(Thailand) Suchanun Viratprasert	6	7

Qualifying competition
9	(Russia) Nina Bratchikova	6	6
5	(Thailand) Suchanun Viratprasert	4	4

==== Second qualifier ====
First round
(China) Yu Ying	3	2
(Belarus) Iryna Kuryanovich	6	6
(China) Hao Jie	1	3
6	(China) Li Na	6	6

Second round
2	(Japan) Aiko Nakamura	6	6
WC	(China) He Chun-yan	1	4
(Belarus) Iryna Kuryanovich	0	3
6	(China) Li Na	6	6

Qualifying competition
2	(Japan) Aiko Nakamura	2	1
6	(China) Li Na	6	6

==== Third qualifier ====
First round
3	(South Africa) Natalie Grandin	6	6
(China) Huang Lei	4	3
(China) Chen Yan-chong	1	1
(China) Yuan Meng	6	6
(China) Liu Wei-juan	3	3
(Italy) Francesca Lubiani	6	6
(Australia) Tiffany Welford	w/o
7	(China) Xie Yan-ze

Second round
3	(South Africa) Natalie Grandin	6	6
(China) Yuan Meng	2	3
(Italy) Francesca Lubiani	6	5	6
(Australia) Tiffany Welford	3	7	3

Qualifying competition
3	(South Africa) Natalie Grandin	6	7
(Italy) Francesca Lubiani	1	5

==== Fourth qualifier ====
First round
4	(China) Liu Nannan	6	6
(China) Dong Yan-hua	3	2
WC	(China) Lu Cheng-jie	0	0
(Chinese Taipei) Janet Lee	6	6
WC	(China) Zhou Ni	6^{1}	0
WC	(China) Zhang Yao	7	6
WC	(China) Li Hewenfei	3	3
8	(Germany) Antonia Matic	6	6

Second round
4	(China) Liu Nannan	6	6
(Chinese Taipei) Janet Lee	2	0
WC	(China) Zhang Yao	4	7	6
8	(Germany) Antonia Matic	6	6^{3}	4

Qualifying competition
4	(China) Liu Nannan	6	6
WC	(China) Zhang Yao	2	0
