= 2004 Guangzhou International Women's Open – Doubles =

Doubles
- 2004 Guangzhou International Women's Open

Final
- Champions: (China) Li Ting (China) Sun Tiantian
- Runners-up: (China) Yang Shu-jing (China) Yu Ying
- Score: 6–4, 6–1

Details
- Draw: 16
- Seeds: 4

Events
Singles	Doubles
Guangzhou International Women's Open	· 2005 →

Li Ting and Sun Tiantian won the first edition of this tournament in an all-Chinese final.

== Seeds ==
1. (Australia) Nicole Pratt / (Thailand) Tamarine Tanasugarn (quarterfinals)
2. (China) Li Ting / (China) Sun Tiantian (winners)
3. (China) Yan Zi / (China) Zheng Jie (semifinals)
4. (Argentina) Gisela Dulko / (Venezuela) María Vento-Kabchi (quarterfinals)

== Draw ==
=== Key ===
- Q = Qualifier
- WC = Wild card
- LL = Lucky loser
- Alt = Alternate
- ITF = ITF entry
- PR = Protected ranking
- SR = Special ranking
- SE = Special exempt
- JE = Junior exempt
- JR = Junior Accelerator Programme entrant
- CO = College Accelerator Programme entrant
- NG = Next Gen Accelerator Program entrant
- w/o = Walkover
- r = Retired
- d = Defaulted

First round
1	(Australia) N Pratt (Thailand) T Tanasugarn	6	6
(United States) J Craybas (Chinese Taipei) J Lee	0	1
(China) S-j Yang (China) Y Yu	6	6
(China) S Peng (China) Y-z Xie	1	4
4	(Argentina) G Dulko (Venezuela) M Vento-Kabchi	4	6	6
(Russia) N Bratchikova (Argentina) M Díaz-Oliva	6	4	1
(Russia) D Safina (Czech Republic) B Strýcová	6	6
(New Zealand) L Baker (Italy) F Lubiani	3	4
Q	(Japan) A Morigami (Japan) A Nakamura	6	3	3
(United States) J Hopkins (China) N Liu	3	6	6
WC	(China) Y-c Chen (China) W-j Liu	1	0
3	(China) Z Yan (China) J Zheng	6	6
(South Africa) N Grandin (Germany) A Matic	2	6	3
(Russia) A Jidkova (Russia) T Panova	6	3	6
(Puerto Rico) K Brandi (South Africa) K Grant	6^{2}	2
2	(China) T Li (China) T Sun	7	6

Quarterfinals
1	(Australia) N Pratt (Thailand) T Tanasugarn	3	6	4
(China) S-j Yang (China) Y Yu	6	2	6
4	(Argentina) G Dulko (Venezuela) M Vento-Kabchi
(Russia) D Safina (Czech Republic) B Strýcová	w/o
(United States) J Hopkins (China) N Liu	3	2
3	(China) Z Yan (China) J Zheng	6	6
(Russia) A Jidkova (Russia) T Panova	3	1
2	(China) T Li (China) T Sun	6	6

Semifinals
(China) S-j Yang (China) Y Yu	w/o
(Russia) D Safina (Czech Republic) B Strýcová
3	(China) Z Yan (China) J Zheng	5	6^{5}
2	(China) T Li (China) T Sun	7	7

Final
(China) S-j Yang (China) Y Yu	4	1
2	(China) T Li (China) T Sun	6	6
