= 2005 Guangzhou International Women's Open – Singles =

Singles
- 2005 Guangzhou International Women's Open

Final
- Champion: (China) Yan Zi
- Runner-up: (Spain) Nuria Llagostera Vives
- Score: 6–4, 4–0 retired

Details
- Draw: 32 (2WC/4Q)
- Seeds: 8

Events
Singles	Doubles
← 2004 ·	Guangzhou International Women's Open	· 2006 →

Li Na was the defending champion, but lost in the quarterfinals to Yan Zi.

Yan reached the final, where she was leading 6–4, 4–0 when her opponent Nuria Llagostera Vives retired due to a hamstring injury, giving Yan the title.

== Seeds ==
1. (Russia) Vera Zvonareva (first round)
2. (China) Peng Shuai (second round, retired due to heat illness)
3. (China) Li Na (quarterfinals)
4. (Russia) Maria Kirilenko (quarterfinals)
5. (China) Zheng Jie (semifinals)
6. (Spain) Nuria Llagostera Vives (final, retired due to a hamstring injury)
7. (Poland) Marta Domachowska (second round)
8. (Slovakia) Martina Suchá (second round)

== Draw ==
=== Key ===
- Q = Qualifier
- WC = Wild card
- LL = Lucky loser
- Alt = Alternate
- SE = Special exempt
- PR = Protected ranking
- ITF = ITF entry
- JE = Junior exempt
- w/o = Walkover
- r = Retired
- d = Defaulted
- SR = Special ranking

=== Finals ===
Semifinals
6	(Spain) Nuria Llagostera Vives	7	6
5	(China) Zheng Jie	5	4
(China) Yan Zi	6	6
Q	(Belarus) Victoria Azarenka	4	3

Final
6	(Spain) Nuria Llagostera Vives	4	0^{r}
(China) Yan Zi	6	4

=== Top half ===
First round
1	(Russia) V Zvonareva	3	5
(China) T Li	6	7
Q	(China) S Sun	3	2
(Russia) A Jidkova	6	6
(United States) A Harkleroad	7	1	0
(China) T Sun	5	6	6
(Austria) S Bammer	2	7	4
6	(Spain) N Llagostera Vives	6	5	6
4	(Russia) M Kirilenko	6	7^{7}
(Italy) ME Camerin	4	6^{1}
Q	(China) M Yuan	3	4
(Spain) A Parra Santonja	6	6
(Ukraine) V Kutuzova	2	1
(United States) J Jackson	6	6
(United States) C Gullickson	7^{7}	5	5
5	(China) J Zheng	6^{1}	7	7

Second round
(China) T Li	2	6	6
(Russia) A Jidkova	6	1	0
(China) T Sun	3	2^{r}
6	(Spain) N Llagostera Vives	6	4
4	(Russia) M Kirilenko	6	6
(Spain) A Parra Santonja	4	2
(United States) J Jackson	1	5
5	(China) J Zheng	6	7

Quarterfinals
(China) T Li	6	4	6^{5}
6	(Spain) N Llagostera Vives	3	6	7^{7}
4	(Russia) M Kirilenko	3	7^{12}	1
5	(China) J Zheng	6	6^{10}	6

Semifinals
6	(Spain) N Llagostera Vives	7	6
5	(China) J Zheng	5	4

=== Bottom half ===
First round
7	(Poland) M Domachowska	3	6	6
(Italy) A Serra Zanetti	6	3	3
(China) Z Yan	6	6
WC	(China) Y Chen	1	1
LL	(Croatia) I Lisjak	5	6	5
(Switzerland) E Gagliardi	7	4	7
(India) S Uberoi	4	1
3	(China) N Li	6	6
8	(Slovakia) M Suchá	6	6
WC	(China) Y Xie	0	1
(Russia) G Voskoboeva	4	0
Q	(Belarus) V Azarenka	6	6
Q	(Chinese Taipei) J Lee	3	4
(Israel) T Obziler	6	6
(Australia) E Dominikovic	3	4
2	(China) S Peng	6	6

Second round
7	(Poland) M Domachowska	2	1
(China) Z Yan	6	6
(Switzerland) E Gagliardi	3	2
3	(China) N Li	6	6
8	(Slovakia) M Suchá	3	2
Q	(Belarus) V Azarenka	6	6
(Israel) T Obziler	4	4
2	(China) S Peng	6	6

Quarterfinals
(China) Z Yan	6^{5}	7	7^{7}
3	(China) N Li	7^{7}	5	6^{4}
Q	(Belarus) V Azarenka	6	1
2	(China) S Peng	4	0^{r}

Semifinals
(China) Z Yan	6	6
Q	(Belarus) V Azarenka	4	3
