= 2006 Guangzhou International Women's Open =

- Date: September 25 – October 1
- Edition: 3rd
- Category: Tier III event
- Prize money: $175,000
- Surface: Hard / outdoor
- Location: Guangzhou, China

Champions

Singles
- (Russia) Anna Chakvetadze

Doubles
- (China) Li Ting / (China) Sun Tiantian
← 2005 ·	Guangzhou International Women's Open	· 2007 →

The 2006 Guangzhou International Women's Open was a tennis tournament played on outdoor hard courts. It was the 3rd edition of the Guangzhou International Women's Open, and was a Tier III event on the 2006 Sony Ericsson WTA Tour. It was held in Guangzhou, China, from September 25 through October 1, 2006. Total prize money for the tournament was $175,000. Anna Chakvetadze won the singles title.

== Singles main-draw entrants ==
=== Seeds ===
Country	Player	Rank^{1}	Seed
SCG	Jelena Janković	17	1
CHN	Li Na	23	2
RUS	Anna Chakvetadze	27	3
ESP	Anabel Medina Garrigues	31	4
ESP	Lourdes Domínguez Lino	41	5
USA	Meghann Shaughnessy	42	6
RUS	Elena Vesnina	54	7
BLR	Anastasiya Yakimova	56	8

- ^{1} Seeds are based on the rankings of September 18, 2006.

=== Other entrants ===
The following players received wildcards into the singles main draw

- (China) Chen Yanchong
- (China) Li Ting
- (China) Zhang Shuai

The following players received entry from the singles qualifying draw:

- (China) Hao Jie
- (China) Ren Jing
- (China) Sun Shengnan
- (Netherlands) Elise Tamaëla

== Finals ==
=== Singles ===
(Russia) Anna Chakvetadze defeated (Spain) Anabel Medina Garrigues, 6–1, 6–4

- Chakvetadze won the first WTA title of her career.

=== Doubles ===
(China) Li Ting / (China) Sun Tiantian defeated (United States) Vania King / (Croatia) Jelena Kostanić, 6–4, 2–6, 7–5

== Prize money and points breakdown ==
=== Singles ===
Round	Money	Points
Winner	$25,855	140
Finalist	$13,845	100
Semifinalist	$7,300	65
Quarterfinalist	$3,910	35
2nd round	$2,105	20
1st round	$1,240	1

=== Doubles ===
Round	Money	Points
Winner	$7,260	140
Finalist	$4,050	100
Semifinalist	$2,140	65
Quarterfinalist	$1,160	35
1st round	$630	1
