= 2005 Guangzhou International Women's Open – Doubles =

Doubles
- 2005 Guangzhou International Women's Open

Final
- Champions: (Italy) Maria Elena Camerin (Switzerland) Emmanuelle Gagliardi
- Runners-up: (United States) Neha Uberoi (India) Shikha Uberoi
- Score: 7–6^{(7–5)}, 6–3

Events
Singles	Doubles
← 2004 ·	Guangzhou International Women's Open	· 2006 →

Li Ting and Sun Tiantian were the defending champions, but decided not to defend their title together.

Li played alongside Li Na, whereas Sun played alongside Hao Jie.

Li & Li withdrew in the quarterfinals, and Hao & Sun lost in the first round to Julia Vorobieva & Yuan Meng.

Maria Elena Camerin and Emmanuelle Gagliardi, having enjoyed a walkover for both the quarterfinals and the semifinals, then won the final, defeating Neha Uberoi and Shikha Uberoi, 7–6^{(7–5)}, 6–3.

== Seeds ==
1. (China) Yan Zi / (China) Zheng Jie (semifinals, withdrew)
2. (United States) Carly Gullickson / (Russia) Maria Kirilenko (quarterfinals, withdrew)
3. (Italy) Maria Elena Camerin / (Switzerland) Emmanuelle Gagliardi (champions)
4. (Russia) Alina Jidkova / (Chinese Taipei) Janet Lee (first round)

== Draw ==
=== Key ===
- Q = Qualifier
- WC = Wild card
- LL = Lucky loser
- Alt = Alternate
- SE = Special exempt
- PR = Protected ranking
- ITF = ITF entry
- JE = Junior exempt
- w/o = Walkover
- r = Retired
- d = Defaulted
- SR = Special ranking

First round
1	(China) Z Yan (China) J Zheng	6	6
(Australia) E Dominikovic (Russia) G Voskoboeva	2	2
(China) J Hao (China) T Sun	3	3
(Russia) J Vorobieva (China) M Yuan	6	6
3	(Italy) ME Camerin (Switzerland) E Gagliardi	6	6
(Poland) M Domachowska (Spain) N Llagostera Vives	2	4
WC	(China) C Lu (China) W Wu	3	0
Q	(Belarus) V Azarenka (Croatia) I Lisjak	6	6
(United States) N Uberoi (India) S Uberoi	4	6	6
(United States) A Harkleroad (Australia) T Musgrave	6	3	1
WC	(China) N Li (China) T Li	3	6	6
4	(Russia) A Jidkova (Chinese Taipei) J Lee	6	1	0
(China) S Peng (China) Y-z Xie	6	6
(China) Y Chen (China) W Liu	4	2
(United States) J Jackson (Italy) A Serra Zanetti	6	1	4
2	(United States) C Gullickson (Russia) M Kirilenko	1	6	6

Quarterfinals
1	(China) Z Yan (China) J Zheng	0
(Russia) J Vorobieva (China) M Yuan	3	r
3	(Italy) ME Camerin (Switzerland) E Gagliardi	w/o
Q	(Belarus) V Azarenka (Croatia) I Lisjak
(United States) N Uberoi (India) S Uberoi	w/o
WC	(China) N Li (China) T Li
(China) S Peng (China) Y-z Xie	w/o
2	(United States) C Gullickson (Russia) M Kirilenko

Semifinals
1	(China) Z Yan (China) J Zheng
3	(Italy) ME Camerin (Switzerland) E Gagliardi	w/o
(United States) N Uberoi (India) S Uberoi	4	7	6
(China) S Peng (China) Y-z Xie	6	5	3

Final
3	(Italy) ME Camerin (Switzerland) E Gagliardi	7^{7}	6
(United States) N Uberoi (India) S Uberoi	6^{5}	3
