= 2005 Guangzhou International Women's Open =

- Date: September 26 – October 2
- Edition: 2nd

Champions

Singles
- (China) Yan Zi

Doubles
- (Italy) Maria Elena Camerin / (Switzerland) Emmanuelle Gagliardi
← 2004 ·	Guangzhou International Women's Open	· 2006 →

The 2005 Guangzhou International Women's Open was a tennis tournament played on outdoor hard courts. It was the 2nd edition of the Guangzhou International Women's Open, and was a Tier III event on the 2005 WTA Tour. It was held in Guangzhou, China, from September 26 through October 2, 2005. Total prize money for the tournament was $170,000.

== Singles main-draw entrants ==
=== Seeds ===
Country	Player	Rank^{1}	Seed
RUS	Vera Zvonareva	20	1
CHN	Peng Shuai	33	2
CHN	Li Na	35	3
RUS	Maria Kirilenko	45	4
CHN	Zheng Jie	46	5
ESP	Nuria Llagostera Vives	54	6
POL	Marta Domachowska	64	7
SVK	Martina Suchá	65	8

- ^{1} Seeds are based on the rankings of September 15, 2005.

=== Other entrants ===
The following players received wildcards into the singles main draw

- (China) Chen Yan-chong
- (China) Xie Yan-ze

The following players received entry from the singles qualifying draw:

- (Belarus) Victoria Azarenka
- (Chinese Taipei) Janet Lee
- (China) Sun Shengnan
- (China) Yuan Meng

The following player received entry as a Lucky loser from the singles qualifying draw:

- (Croatia) Ivana Lisjak

== Finals results ==
=== Singles ===
(France) Yan Zi def. (Spain) Nuria Llagostera Vives, 6–4, 4–0, ret.

- Yan won the first WTA title of her career.

=== Doubles ===
(Italy) Maria Elena Camerin / (Switzerland) Emmanuelle Gagliardi def. (United States) Neha Uberoi / (India) Shikha Uberoi, 7–6^{(7–5)}, 6–3
