= 2004 Guangzhou International Women's Open =

- Date: September 27 – October 3
- Edition: 1st
- Category: Tier III Series
- Draw: 30S / 16D
- Prize money: $170,000
- Surface: Hard / outdoor
- Location: Guangzhou, China

Champions

Singles
- (China) Li Na

Doubles
- (China) Li Ting / (China) Sun Tiantian
Guangzhou International Women's Open	· 2005 →

The 2004 Guangzhou International Women's Open was a tennis tournament played on outdoor hard courts. It was the inaugural edition of the Guangzhou International Women's Open, and was a Tier III event on the 2004 WTA Tour. It was held in Guangzhou, China, from late September through early October, 2004. Total prize money for the tournament was $170,000. Unseeded Li Na, who entered the main draw as a qualifier, won the singles title.

== Finals ==
=== Singles ===
(China) Li Na defeated (Slovakia) Martina Suchá, 6–3, 6–4

- It was Li's only singles title of the year and the 1st of her career.

=== Doubles ===
(China) Li Ting / (China) Sun Tiantian defeated (China) Yang Shu-jing / (China) Yu Ying, 6–4, 6–1
