= Li Na career statistics =

Career finals
Discipline	Type	Won	Lost	Total	WR (Note: Winning rate)
Singles	Grand Slam	2	2	4	0.50
Singles	Summer Olympics	–	–	–	–
Singles	WTA Finals (Note: Formerly known as: Virginia Slims Championships (until 1995); WTA Tour Championships (until 2014))	–	1	1	0.00
Singles	WTA Elite (Note: Elite tier: WTA Tournament of Champions (2009–14); WTA Elite Trophy (2015–present))	–	–	–	–
Singles	WTA 1000 (Note: Formerly known as: Category 4 & 5 & 6 (until 1990); Tier I (until 2009); WTA Premier Mandatory and 5 (until 2021))	1	3	4	0.25
Singles	WTA 500 (Note: Formerly known as: Category 3 (until 1990); Tier II (until 2009); WTA Premier (until 2021))	1	2	3	0.33
Singles	WTA 250 (Note: Formerly known as: Category 1 & 2 (until 1990); Tier III & IV & V (until 2009); WTA International (until 2021))	5	4	9	0.56
Singles	Total	9	12	21	0.43
Doubles	Grand Slam	–	–	–	–
Doubles	Summer Olympics	–	–	–	–
Doubles	WTA Finals	–	–	–	–
Doubles	WTA Elite	–	–	–	–
Doubles	WTA 1000	–	–	–	–
Doubles	WTA 500	–	–	–	–
Doubles	WTA 250	2	0	2	1.00
Doubles	Total	2	0	2	1.00
Total		11	12	23	0.48

This is a list of the main career statistics of Chinese professional tennis player, Li Na. Over the course of her career, Li won nine WTA singles titles, including two Grand Slam singles titles at the 2011 French Open and 2014 Australian Open and one Premier 5 singles title at the 2012 Western & Southern Open. She also finished in fourth place at the 2008 Beijing Olympics and was the runner-up at the 2011 and 2013 Australian Open and 2013 WTA Tour Championships. Li achieved a career-high singles ranking of world No. 2 on February 17, 2014.

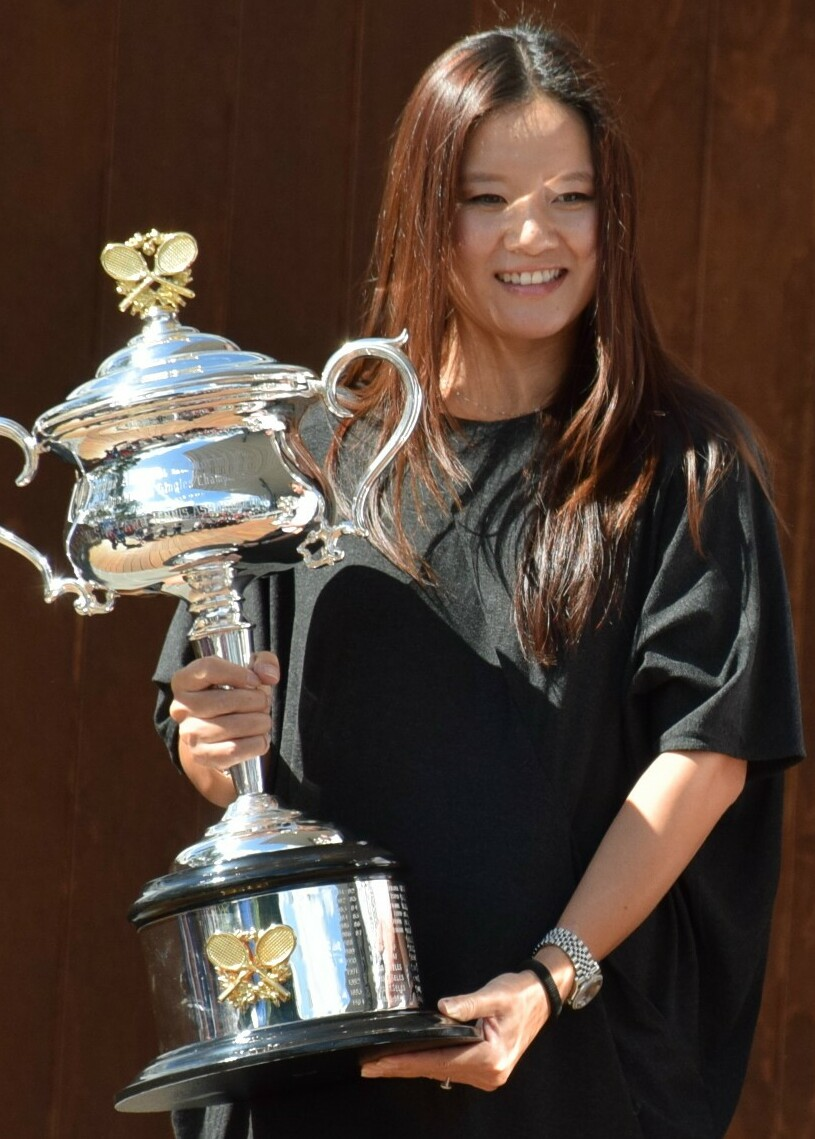
Li with 2014 Australian Open's trophy after she defeated Cibulková

== Performance timeline ==
Key
W	F	SF	QF	#R	RR	Q#	P#	DNQ	A	Z#	PO	G	S	B	NMS	NTI	P	NH

(W) winner; (F) finalist; (SF) semifinalist; (QF) quarterfinalist; (#R) rounds 4, 3, 2, 1; (RR) round-robin stage; (Q#) qualification round; (P#) preliminary round; (DNQ) did not qualify; (A) absent; (Z#) Davis/Fed Cup Zonal Group (with number indication) or (PO) play-off; (G) gold, (S) silver or (B) bronze Olympic/Paralympic medal; (NMS) not a Masters tournament; (NTI) not a Tier I tournament; (P) postponed; (NH) not held; (SR) strike rate (events won / competed); (W–L) win–loss record.

Only main-draw results in WTA Tour, Grand Slam tournaments, Billie Jean King Cup (Fed Cup), Hopman Cup and Olympic Games are included in win–loss records.

=== Singles ===
Tournament	2000	2001	...	2004	2005	2006	2007	2008	2009	2010	2011	2012	2013	2014	SR	W–L	Win %
Grand Slam tournaments
Australian Open	A	Q1		A	3R	1R	4R	3R	A	SF	F	4R	F	W	1 / 9	34–8	81%
French Open	A	A		A	A	3R	3R	A	4R	3R	W	4R	2R	1R	1 / 8	20–7	74%
Wimbledon	A	Q1		A	A	QF	A	2R	3R	QF	2R	2R	QF	3R	0 / 8	19–8	70%
US Open	Q2	A		A	1R	4R	A	4R	QF	1R	1R	3R	SF	A	0 / 8	17–8	68%
Win–loss	0–0	0–0		0–0	2–2	9–4	5–2	6–3	9–3	11–4	14–3	9–4	16–4	9–2	2 / 33	90–31	74%
National representation
Summer Olympics	1R	NH		A	NH			4th	NH			1R	NH		0 / 3	4–4	50%
Year-end championships
WTA Finals	DNQ									Alt	RR	RR	F	A	0 / 3	6–5	55%
WTA Tournament of Champions	NH								DNQ	1R	A	A	A	A	0 / 1	0–1	0%
WTA 1000 + former^{†} tournaments
Dubai / Qatar Open (Note: The first Premier 5 event of the year has switched back and forth between the Dubai Tennis Championships and the Qatar Total Open since 2009. Dubai was classified as a Premier 5 event from 2009 to 2011 before being succeeded by Doha for the 2012–2014 period. In 2015, Dubai regained its Premier 5 status while Doha was demoted to Premier status. The Premier 5 tournaments were reclassified as WTA 1000 tournaments in 2021.)	NH	NMS						SF	1R	QF	2R	A	A	3R	0 / 5	7–5	40%
Indian Wells Open	A	A		A	A	4R	SF	A	4R	2R	2R	QF	A	SF	0 / 7	17–7	71%
Miami Open	A	A		A	A	2R	QF	A	QF	2R	2R	QF	QF	F	0 / 8	19–8	70%
Berlin / Madrid Open (Note: In 2009, the Berlin Open was replaced by the Madrid Open. The Premier Mandatory tournaments were reclassified as WTA 1000 tournaments in 2021.)	A	A		A	A	SF	2R	A	2R	QF	SF	QF	1R	QF	0 / 8	19–8	70%
Italian Open	A	A		A	A	A	A	A	1R	A	SF	F	3R	QF	0 / 4	8–4	67%
Canadian Open	A	A		A	3R	1R	A	A	A	3R	3R	F	SF	A	0 / 6	10–6	63%
Cincinnati Open	NH			NMS					A	3R	3R	W	SF	A	1 / 4	9–3	75%
Pan Pacific / Wuhan Open (Note: In 2014, the Toray Pan Pacific Open was downgraded to a Premier event and replaced by the Wuhan Open. The Premier 5 tournaments were reclassified as WTA 1000 tournaments in 2021.)	A	A		A	A	A	2R	1R	SF	A	A	3R	A	A	0 / 4	6–4	60%
China Open	NMS								3R	SF	1R	SF	QF	A	0 / 5	12–5	70%
Family Circle Cup^{†}	A	A		A	A	A	3R	A	NMS						0 / 1	1–1	50%
Kremlin Cup^{†}	A	A		A	A	1R	A	1R	NMS						0 / 2	0–2	0%
Win–loss										11–7		26–7	12–6				
Career statistics
	2000	2001	...	2004	2005	2006	2007	2008	2009	2010	2011	2012	2013	2014	SR	W–L	Win %
Tournaments	3	1		2	14	22	13	15	17	21	18	16	15	9	Career total: 166		
Titles	0	0		1	0	0	0	1	0	1	2	1	1	2	Career total: 9		
Finals	0	0		1	1	1	0	1	2	1	3	4	4	3	Career total: 21		
Overall win–loss	1–3	0–1		6–1	23–14	40–21	23–13	29–15	35–16	36–20	32–17	42–17	44–14	28–7	9 / 166	503–188	73%
Win (%)	25%	0%		86%	62%	66%	64%	66%	69%	64%	65%	74%	76%	80%	Career total: 73%		
Year-end ranking	134	303		80	57	21	29	23	15	11	5	7	3	9	$16,709,074		

=== Doubles ===
Tournament	2000	2001	2005	2006	2007	2008	SR	W–L
Australian Open	A	1R	A	2R	2R	1R	0 / 4	2–4
French Open	A	A	A	2R	2R	A	0 / 2	2–2
Wimbledon	A	A	A	2R	A	A	0 / 1	1–1
US Open	2R	A	3R	1R	A	A	0 / 3	3–3
Win–loss	1–1	0–1	2–1	3–4	2–2	0–1	0 / 10	8–10

== Significant finals ==
=== Grand Slams ===
==== Singles: 4 (2 titles, 2 runner-ups) ====
Result	Year	Championship	Surface	Opponent	Score
Loss	2011	Australian Open	Hard	(Belgium) Kim Clijsters	6–3, 3–6, 3–6
Win	2011	French Open	Clay	(Italy) Francesca Schiavone	6–4, 7–6^{(7–0)}
Loss	2013	Australian Open	Hard	(Belarus) Victoria Azarenka	6–4, 4–6, 3–6
Win	2014	Australian Open	Hard	(Slovakia) Dominika Cibulková	7–6^{(7–3)}, 6–0

=== Olympics ===
==== Singles: 1 bronze medal match ====
Result	Year	Tournament	Surface	Opponent	Score
4th place	2008	Beijing Summer Olympics	Hard	(Russia) Vera Zvonareva	0–6, 5–7

=== WTA Finals ===
==== Singles: 1 (1 runner-up) ====
Result	Year	Tournament	Surface	Opponent	Score
Loss	2013	WTA Finals, Istanbul	Hard (i)	(United States) Serena Williams	6–2, 3–6, 0–6

=== WTA 1000 ===
==== Singles: 4 (1 title, 3 runner-ups) ====
Result	Year	Tournament	Surface	Opponent	Score
Loss	2012	Italian Open	Clay	(Russia) Maria Sharapova	6–4, 4–6, 6–7^{(5–7)}
Loss	2012	Canadian Open	Hard	(Czech Republic) Petra Kvitová	5–7, 6–2, 3–6
Win	2012	Cincinnati Masters	Hard	(Germany) Angelique Kerber	1–6, 6–3, 6–1
Loss	2014	Miami Masters	Hard	(United States) Serena Williams	5–7, 1–6

== WTA Tour finals ==
=== Singles: 21 (9 titles, 12 runner-ups) ===
Legend Grand Slam tournaments (2–2) WTA Finals (0–1) WTA 1000 (Premier 5 / Premier M) (1–3) WTA 500 (Premier) (1–2) WTA 250 (Tier III / Tier IV / International) (5–4)	Finals by surface Hard (7–7) Grass (1–1) Clay (1–4)

Result	W–L	Date	Tournament	Tier	Surface	Opponent	Score
Win	1–0	Oct 2004	Guangzhou International, China	Tier III	Hard	(Slovakia) Martina Suchá	6–3, 6–4
Loss	1–1	May 2005	Estoril Open, Portugal	Tier IV	Clay	(Czech Republic) Lucie Šafářová	7–6^{(7–4)}, 4–6, 3–6
Loss	1–2	May 2006	Estoril Open, Portugal	Tier IV	Clay	(China) Zheng Jie	7–6^{(7–4)}, 5–7 ret.
Win	2–2	Jan 2008	Gold Coast Championships, Australia	Tier III	Hard	(Belarus) Victoria Azarenka	4–6, 6–3, 6–4
Loss	2–3	Mar 2009	Monterrey Open, Mexico	International	Hard	(France) Marion Bartoli	4–6, 3–6
Loss	2–4	Jun 2009	Birmingham Classic, UK	International	Grass	(Slovakia) Magdaléna Rybáriková	0–6, 6–7^{(2–7)}
Win	3–4	Jun 2010	Birmingham Classic, UK	International	Grass	(Russia) Maria Sharapova	7–5, 6–1
Win	4–4	Jan 2011	Sydney International, Australia	Premier	Hard	(Belgium) Kim Clijsters	7–6^{(7–3)}, 6–3
Loss	4–5	Jan 2011	Australian Open	Grand Slam	Hard	(Belgium) Kim Clijsters	6–3, 3–6, 3–6
Win	5–5	Jun 2011	French Open	Grand Slam	Clay	(Italy) Francesca Schiavone	6–4, 7–6^{(7–0)}
Loss	5–6	Jan 2012	Sydney International, Australia	Premier	Hard	(Belarus) Victoria Azarenka	2–6, 6–1, 3–6
Loss	5–7	May 2012	Italian Open	Premier 5	Clay	(Russia) Maria Sharapova	6–4, 4–6, 6–7^{(5–7)}
Loss	5–8	Aug 2012	Canadian Open	Premier 5	Hard	(Czech Republic) Petra Kvitová	5–7, 6–2, 3–6
Win	6–8	Aug 2012	Cincinnati Open, USA	Premier 5	Hard	(Germany) Angelique Kerber	1–6, 6–3, 6–1
Win	7–8	Jan 2013	Shenzhen Open, China	International	Hard	(Czech Republic) Klára Zakopalová	6–3, 1–6, 7–5
Loss	7–9	Jan 2013	Australian Open	Grand Slam	Hard	(Belarus) Victoria Azarenka	6–4, 4–6, 3–6
Loss	7–10	Apr 2013	Stuttgart Open, Germany	Premier	Clay (i)	(Russia) Maria Sharapova	4–6, 3–6
Loss	7–11	Oct 2013	WTA Championships, Turkey	Finals	Hard (i)	(United States) Serena Williams	6–2, 3–6, 0–6
Win	8–11	Jan 2014	Shenzhen Open, China (2)	International	Hard	(China) Peng Shuai	6–4, 7–5
Win	9–11	Jan 2014	Australian Open	Grand Slam	Hard	(Slovakia) Dominika Cibulková	7–6^{(7–3)}, 6–0
Loss	9–12	Mar 2014	Miami Open, USA	Premier M	Hard	(United States) Serena Williams	5–7, 1–6

=== Doubles: 2 (2 titles) ===
Legend WTA 250 (Tier III / Tier IV) (2–0)	Finals by surface Hard (1–0) Grass (1–0)

Result	W–L	Date	Tournament	Tier	Surface	Partner	Opponents	Score
Win	1–0	Jun 2000	Tashkent Open, Uzbekistan	Tier IV	Hard	(China) Li Ting	(Uzbekistan) Iroda Tulyaganova (Ukraine) Anna Zaporozhanova	3–6, 6–2, 6–4
Win	2–0	Jun 2006	Birmingham Classic, UK	Tier III	Grass	(Serbia) Jelena Janković	(United States) Jill Craybas (South Africa) Liezel Huber	6–2, 6–4

== ITF finals ==
=== Singles: 20 (19 titles, 1 runner–up) ===
Legend
$75,000 tournaments (1–0)
$50,000 tournaments (3–0)
$25,000 tournaments (7–1)
$10,000 tournaments (8–0)

Result	W–L	Date	Tournament	Tier	Surface	Opponent	Score
Win	1–0	Jun 1999	ITF Shenzhen, China	10,000	Hard	(South Korea) Chung Yang-jin	6–2, 6–3
Win	2–0	Jun 1999	ITF Shenzhen, China	10,000	Hard	(South Korea) Chung Yang-jin	6–0, 6–0
Win	3–0	Aug 1999	ITF Westende, Belgium	10,000	Clay	(Belgium) Daphne van de Zande	6–3, 6–1
Win	4–0	Jan 2000	ITF Boca Raton, United States	10,000	Hard	(United States) Sandra Cacic	6–4, 6–3
Win	5–0	Mar 2000	ITF Nanjing, China	10,000	Hard	(Canada) Marie-Ève Pelletier	7–6^{(7–3)}, 6–2
Win	6–0	Apr 2000	ITF Nanjing, China	10,000	Hard	(China) Ding Ding	6–2, 6–2
Win	7–0	Apr 2000	ITF Shenyang, China	10,000	Hard	(China) Sun Tiantian	6–0, 6–4
Win	8–0	Apr 2000	ITF Dalian, China	10,000	Hard	(China) Chen Li-Ling	6–4, 6–4
Win	9–0	May 2000	ITF Seoul, South Korea	50,000	Clay	(South Korea) Kim Eun-ha	6–3, 7–6^{(7–1)}
Win	10–0	May 2000	ITF Ho Chi Minh City, Vietnam	25,000	Hard	(Indonesia) Wynne Prakusya	6–1, 6–2
Win	11–0	Jul 2000	ITF Civitanova Marche, Italy	25,000	Clay	(Switzerland) Emmanuelle Gagliardi	6–3, 4–6, 7–6^{(7–0)}
Win	12–0	Apr 2001	ITF Ho Chi Minh City, Vietnam	25,000	Hard	(Italy) Roberta Vinci	6–4, 7–5
Win	13–0	Jul 2001	ITF Guangzhou, China	25,000	Hard	(China) Liu Nannan	6–1, 6–2
Win	14–0	Feb 2002	ITF Midland, United States	75,000	Hard	(United States) Mashona Washington	6–1, 6–2
Win	15–0	May 2004	ITF Beijing, China	25,000	Hard	(Japan) Seiko Okamoto	6–4, 6–4
Win	16–0	May 2004	ITF Tongliao, China	25,000	Hard	(Morocco) Bahia Mouhtassine	6–4, 2–6, 7–6^{(7–5)}
Win	17–0	Jun 2004	ITF Wulanhaote, China	25,000	Hard	(China) Liu Nannan	6–0, 6–0
Win	18–0	Jun 2004	ITF Beijing, China	50,000	Hard	(Thailand) Suchanan Viratprasert	6–2, 6–4
Loss	18–1	Sep 2004	ITF Beijing, China	25,000	Hard	(China) Zheng Jie	4–6, 4–6
Win	19–1	Oct 2004	ITF Shenzhen, China	50,000	Hard	(China) Sun Tiantian	6–3, 4–6, 6–2

=== Doubles: 21 (16 titles, 5 runner–ups) ===
Legend
$50,000 tournaments (3–1)
$25,000 tournaments (2–2)
$10,000 tournaments (11–2)

Result	W–L	Date	Tournament	Tier	Surface	Partnering	Opponents	Score
Win	1–0	Jun 1999	ITF Shenzhen, China	10,000	Hard	(China) Li Ting	(Indonesia) Liza Andriyani (Indonesia) Irawati Iskandar	6–1, 6–3
Win	2–0	Jun 1999	ITF Shenzhen, China	10,000	Hard	(China) Li Ting	(South Korea) Chung Yang-jin (South Korea) Lee Eun-jeong	6–3, 6–1
Win	3–0	Aug 1999	ITF Rebecq, Belgium	10,000	Clay	(China) Li Ting	(Netherlands) Natasha Galouza (Netherlands) Maaike Koutstaal	6–1, 6–4
Win	4–0	Aug 1999	ITF Koksijde, Belgium	10,000	Clay	(China) Li Ting	(New Zealand) Rewa Hudson (New Zealand) Shelley Stephens	6–3, 6–2
Win	5–0	Aug 1999	ITF Westende, Belgium	10,000	Clay	(China) Li Ting	(Netherlands) Natasha Galouza (Netherlands) Anouk Sterk	7–6^{(5)}, 6–2
Win	6–0	Sep 1999	ITF Ibaraki, Japan	10,000	Clay	(China) Li Ting	(South Africa) Mareze Joubert (United Kingdom) Kate Warne-Holland	7–6^{(4)}, 6–3
Win	7–0	Sep 1999	ITF Tokyo, Japan	10,000	Clay	(China) Li Ting	(Japan) Maki Arai (Japan) Kumiko Iijima	6–2, 6–1
Win	8–0	Dec 1999	ITF Manila, Philippines	25,000	Hard	(China) Li Ting	(Japan) Haruka Inoue (Japan) Maiko Inoue	6–3, 6–2
Loss	8–1	Jan 2000	ITF Boca Raton, United States	10,000	Hard	(China) Li Ting	(United States) Sandra Cacic (United States) Lindsay Lee-Waters	4–6, 5–7
Win	9–1	Jan 2000	ITF Hallandale, United States	10,000	Hard	(China) Li Ting	(United States) Jean Okada (Czech Republic) Hana Šromová	6–3, 7–5
Win	10–1	Feb 2000	ITF Chengdu City, China	25,000	Hard	(China) Li Ting	(Brazil) Joana Cortez (Hungary) Katalin Marosi	6–1, 6–3
Win	11–1	Mar 2000	ITF Nanjing, China	10,000	Hard	(China) Li Ting	(South Korea) Chae Kyung-yee (Japan) Ryoko Takemura	7–6^{(4)}, 6–1
Win	12–1	Apr 2000	ITF Nanjing, China	10,000	Hard	(China) Li Ting	(China) Ding Ding (China) Lin Ya-ming	6–1, 7–6
Win	13–1	Apr 2000	ITF Dalian, China	10,000	Hard	(China) Ding Ding	(South Korea) Chang Kyung-mi (Japan) Satoko Kurioka	7–5, 6–3
Loss	13–2	May 2000	ITF Seoul, South Korea	50,000	Clay	(China) Li Ting	(Japan) Shinobu Asagoe (Japan) Saori Obata	1–6, 3–6
Loss	13–3	May 2000	ITF Ho Chi Minh City, Vietnam	25,000	Hard	(China) Li Ting	(South Korea) Cho Yoon-jeong (Japan) Saori Obata	1–6, 2–6
Loss	13–4	Jun 2000	ITF Shenzhen, China	25,000	Hard	(China) Li Ting	(South Korea) Kim Eun-ha (Japan) Saori Obata	1–6, 3–6
Win	14–4	Jul 2000	ITF Orbetello, Italy	25,000	Clay	(China) Li Ting	(Brazil) Joana Cortez (Brazil) Miriam D'Agostini	6–3, 7–6^{(3)}
Win	15–4	Mar 2001	ITF Hangzhou, China	25,000	Hard	(China) Lui-Li Shen	(Slovakia) Lenka Dlhopolcová (Japan) Remi Tezuka	6–3, 6–3
Loss	15–5	Apr 2002	ITF Cagliari, Italy	10,000	Clay	(China) Li Ting	(China) Yan Zi (China) Zheng Jie	4–6, 0–6
Win	16–5	Aug 2004	ITF Bronx, United States	50,000	Hard	(China) Liu Nannan	(United States) Jessica Lehnhoff (Australia) Christina Wheeler	5–7, 6–3, 6–3

== WTA Tour career earnings ==
Li earned more than 16 million dollars during her career.

Year	Grand Slam singles titles	WTA singles titles	Total singles titles	Earnings ($)	Money list rank
2004	0	1	1	65,950	155
2005	0	0	0	139,798	97
2006	0	0	0	460,982	30
2007	0	0	0	377,940	44
2008	0	1	1	386,568	42
2009	0	0	0	646,085	29
2010	0	1	1	1,158,898	15
2011	1	1	2	3,709,139	4
2012	0	1	1	2,280,646	8
2013	0	1	1	3,982,485	3
2014	1	1	2	3,409,885	5
Career	2	7	9	16,709,074	17

== Career Grand Slam statistics ==
=== Seedings ===
The tournaments won by Li are in boldface, and advanced into finals by Li are in italics.

Year	Australian Open	French Open	Wimbledon	US Open
2006	absent	absent	27th	24th
2007	19th	16th	absent	absent
2008	24th	absent	absent	absent
2009	absent	25th	19th	18th
2010	16th	11th	9th	8th
2011	9th (1)	**6th (1)**	3rd	6th
2012	5th	7th	11th	9th
2013	6th (2)	6th	6th	5th
2014	**4th (2)**	2nd	2nd	absent

=== Best Grand Slam results details ===
Grand Slam winners are in boldface, and runner–ups are in italics.

**Australian Open**
**2014 Australian Open (4th)**
Round	Opponent	Rank	Score
1R	(Croatia) Ana Konjuh (Q)	241	6–2, 6–0
2R	(Switzerland) Belinda Bencic (Q)	187	6–0, 7–6^{(7–5)}
3R	(Czech Republic) Lucie Šafářová (26)	26	1–6, 7–6^{(7–2)}, 6–3
4R	(Russia) Ekaterina Makarova (22)	22	6–2, 6–0
QF	(Italy) Flavia Pennetta (28)	29	6–2, 6–2
SF	(Canada) Eugenie Bouchard (30)	31	6–2, 6–4
**W**	(Slovakia) Dominika Cibulková (20)	24	7–6^{(7–3)}, 6–0

**Wimbledon Championships**
**2006 Wimbledon (27th)**
Round	Opponent	Rank	Score
1R	(France) Virginie Razzano	89	6–2, 6–0
2R	(United States) Meilen Tu (Q)	105	6–2, 6–4
3R	(Russia) Svetlana Kuznetsova (5)	**6**	3–6, 6–2, 6–3
4R	(Czech Republic) Nicole Vaidišová (10)	13	4–6, 6–1, 6–3
QF	(Belgium) Kim Clijsters (2)	**2**	4–6, 5–7
**2010 Wimbledon (9th)**
Round	Opponent	Rank	Score
1R	(South Africa) Chanelle Scheepers (WC)	88	7–6^{(7–5)}, 6–2
2R	(Japan) Kurumi Nara (Q)	149	6–2, 6–4
3R	(Australia) Anastasia Rodionova	74	6–1, 6–3
4R	(Poland) Agnieszka Radwańska (7)	**9**	6–3, 6–2
QF	**(United States) Serena Williams (1)**	**1**	5–7, 3–6
**2013 Wimbledon (6th)**
Round	Opponent	Rank	Score
1R	(Netherlands) Michaëlla Krajicek	575	6–1, 6–1
2R	(Romania) Simona Halep	32	6–2, 1–6, 6–0
3R	(Czech Republic) Klára Zakopalová (32)	43	4–6, 6–0, 8–6
4R	(Italy) Roberta Vinci (11)	11	6–2, 6–0
QF	(Poland) Agnieszka Radwańska (4)	**4**	6–7^{(5–7)}, 6–4, 2–6

**French Open**
**2011 French Open (6th)**
Round	Opponent	Rank	Score
1R	(Czech Republic) Barbora Záhlavová	49	6–3, 6–7^{(6–8)}, 6–3
2R	(Spain) Sílvia Soler Espinosa (Q)	158	6–4, 7–5
3R	(Romania) Sorana Cîrstea	99	6–2, 6–2
4R	(Czech Republic) Petra Kvitová (9)	**9**	2–6, 6–1, 6–3
QF	(Belarus) Victoria Azarenka (4)	**4**	7–5, 6–2
SF	(Russia) Maria Sharapova (7)	**8**	6–4, 7–5
**W**	(Italy) Francesca Schiavone (5)	**5**	6–4, 7–6^{(7–0)}

**US Open**
**2013 US Open (5th)**
Round	Opponent	Rank	Score
1R	(Belarus) Olga Govortsova	88	6–2, 6–2
2R	(Sweden) Sofia Arvidsson	100	6–2, 6–2
3R	(United Kingdom) Laura Robson (30)	32	6–2, 7–5
4R	(Serbia) Jelena Janković (9)	12	6–3, 6–0
QF	(Russia) Ekaterina Makarova (24)	25	6–4, 6–7^{(5–7)}, 6–2
SF	**(United States) Serena Williams (1)**	**1**	0–6, 3–6

== Record against other players ==
=== No. 1 wins ===
#	Player	Event	Surface	Round	Score	Outcome
1.	(United States) Serena Williams	2008 Stuttgart Open	Hard (i)	2R	0–6, 6–1, 6–4	QF
2.	(Denmark) Caroline Wozniacki	2011 Australian Open	Hard	SF	3–6, 7–5, 6–3	F

=== Top 10 wins ===
Season	2006	2007	2008	2009	2010	2011	2012	2013	Total
Wins	2	4	5	3	5	8	7	8	42

#	Player	vsRank	Event	Surface	Round	Score	Rank
2006
1.	(Switzerland) Patty Schnyder	9	Berlin Open, Germany	Clay	QF	2–6, 7–6^{(7–3)}, 7–6^{(7–1)}	61
2.	(Russia) Svetlana Kuznetsova	6	Wimbledon, United Kingdom	Grass	3R	3–6, 6–2, 6–3	30
2007
3.	(Russia) Elena Dementieva	8	Sydney International, Australia	Hard	2R	3–6, 6–1, 7–5	21
4.	(Russia) Dinara Safina	10	Australian Open	Hard	3R	6–2, 6–2	16
5.	(Serbia) Jelena Janković	9	Indian Wells Open, United States	Hard	4R	6–3, 7–6^{(7–1)}	17
6.	(Belgium) Kim Clijsters	5	Miami Open, United States	Hard	4R	4–6, 6–4, 6–2	17
2008
7.	(Russia) Anna Chakvetadze	6	Qatar Open, Qatar	Hard	2R	7–6^{(9–7)}, 6–4	29
8.	(Serbia) Jelena Janković	4	Qatar Open, Qatar	Hard	QF	6–3, 6–4	29
9.	(Russia) Svetlana Kuznetsova	3	Summer Olympics, Beijing, China	Hard	1R	7–6^{(7–5)}, 6–4	42
10.	(United States) Venus Williams	8	Summer Olympics, Beijing, China	Hard	QF	7–5, 7–5	42
11.	(United States) Serena Williams	1	Stuttgart Open, Germany	Hard (i)	2R	0–6, 6–1, 6–4	30
2009
12.	(Poland) Agnieszka Radwańska	10	Monterrey Open, Mexico	Hard	1R	7–6^{(7–5)}, 4–6, 6–0	53
13.	(Russia) Vera Zvonareva	5	Miami Open, United States	Hard	3R	6–4, 3–6, 6–2	40
14.	(Belarus) Victoria Azarenka	9	Pan Pacific Open, Japan	Hard	QF	7–6^{(9–7)}, 4–6, 7–6^{(7–4)}	16
2010
15.	(Denmark) Caroline Wozniacki	4	Sydney International, Australia	Hard	1R	2–6, 6–3, 6–2	17
16.	(Denmark) Caroline Wozniacki	4	Australian Open	Hard	4R	6–4, 6–3	17
17.	(United States) Venus Williams	6	Australian Open	Hard	QF	2–6, 7–6^{(7–4)}, 7–5	17
18.	(Russia) Svetlana Kuznetsova	5	Stuttgart Open, Germany	Clay (i)	2R	6–3, 7–5	16
19.	(Poland) Agnieszka Radwańska	9	Wimbledon, UK	Grass	4R	6–3, 6–2	12
2011
20.	(Belgium) Kim Clijsters	3	Sydney International, Australia	Hard	F	7–6^{(7–3)}, 6–3	11
21.	(Belarus) Victoria Azarenka	9	Australian Open	Hard	4R	6–3, 6–3	11
22.	(Denmark) Caroline Wozniacki	1	Australian Open	Hard	SF	3–6, 7–5, 6–3	11
23.	(Czech Republic) Petra Kvitová	9	French Open	Clay	4R	2–6, 6–1, 6–3	7
24.	(Belarus) Victoria Azarenka	4	French Open	Clay	QF	7–5, 6–2	7
25.	(Russia) Maria Sharapova	8	French Open	Clay	SF	6–4, 7–5	7
26.	(Italy) Francesca Schiavone	5	French Open	Clay	F	6–4, 7–6^{(7–0)}	7
27.	(Russia) Maria Sharapova	2	WTA Tour Championships, Istanbul, Turkey	Hard (i)	RR	7–6^{(7–4)}, 6–4	5
2012
28.	(Czech Republic) Petra Kvitová	2	Sydney International, Australia	Hard	SF	1–6, 7–5, 6–2	5
29.	(Italy) Sara Errani	9	Canadian Open, Canada	Hard	3R	6–4, 6–2	11
30.	(Poland) Agnieszka Radwańska	3	Canadian Open, Canada	Hard	QF	6–2, 6–1	11
31.	(Poland) Agnieszka Radwańska	3	Cincinnati Open, United States	Hard	QF	6–1, 6–1	9
32.	(Germany) Angelique Kerber	7	Cincinnati Open, United States	Hard	F	1–6, 6–3, 6–1	9
33.	(Poland) Agnieszka Radwańska	3	China Open, China	Hard	QF	6–4, 6–2	8
34.	(Germany) Angelique Kerber	5	WTA Tour Championships, Istanbul, Turkey	Hard (i)	RR	6–4, 6–3	8
2013
35.	(Poland) Agnieszka Radwańska	4	Australian Open	Hard	QF	7–5, 6–3	6
36.	(Russia) Maria Sharapova	2	Australian Open	Hard	SF	6–2, 6–2	6
37.	(Czech Republic) Petra Kvitová	8	Stuttgart Open, Germany	Clay (i)	QF	6–3, 7–5	5
38.	(Germany) Angelique Kerber	8	Cincinnati Open, United States	Hard	3R	6–4, 6–4	5
39.	(Italy) Sara Errani	7	WTA Tour Championships, Istanbul, Turkey	Hard (i)	RR	6–3, 7–6^{(7–5)}	5
40.	(Serbia) Jelena Janković	8	WTA Tour Championships, Istanbul, Turkey	Hard (i)	RR	6–3, 2–6, 6–3	5
41.	(Belarus) Victoria Azarenka	2	WTA Tour Championships, Istanbul, Turkey	Hard (i)	RR	6–2, 6–1	5
42.	(Czech Republic) Petra Kvitová	6	WTA Tour Championships, Istanbul, Turkey	Hard (i)	SF	6–4, 6–2	5
