= Neha Uberoi =

American tennis player

- Country (sports): United States
- Residence: Boca Raton, Florida, United States
- Born: 6 February 1986 (age 39) Morristown, New Jersey, U.S.
- Height: 1.70 m (5 ft 7 in)
- Turned pro: October 2003
- Retired: 2010
- Plays: Right-handed, two-handed backhand
- Prize money: US$152,586
- Official website: http://www.nehauberoi.com/ https://www.youtube.com/user/TheNehaUberoi

Singles
- Career record: 135–149
- Career titles: 0
- Highest ranking: No. 196 (29 January 2007)

Grand Slam singles results
- Australian Open: Q2 (2007)
- US Open: Q2 (2005)

Doubles
- Career record: 58–111
- Career titles: 0
- Highest ranking: No. 107 (22 May 2006)

Grand Slam doubles results
- US Open: 2R (2005)
- Last updated on: 20 August 2010.

Neha Uberoi, also known by her married name Neha Uberoi Khangoora (born 6 February 1986), is an American former professional tennis player and a psychotherapist (LCSW) .

On 29 January 2007, she reached her best singles ranking of world number 196. On 22 May 2006, she peaked at world number 107 in the doubles rankings. In doubles, she qualified and reached the second round of the US Open in doubles in 2005, she was a finalist at the 2005 Sunfeast Open and the 2005 Guangzhou International Women's Open. Uberoi retired from tennis in 2008.

== Personal life ==
Neha retired from professional tennis in 2008 and graduated from Princeton with a degree in sociology in 2012. In 2016 she got married. She co-founded a non-profit organization South Asians in Sports.

Neha is one of five sisters (two professional) who all played tennis. Her father, Mahesh, is a serial entrepreneur and managed her tennis career; her mother, Madhu, is a homemaker; and she has two older sisters, Diya and Shikha Uberoi (also a professional tennis player), and two younger sisters, Nikita (also a professional tennis player) and Nimita. She speaks Hindi, English and Spanish. Neha loves to visit relatives in Mumbai, India. She is the niece of actor Suresh Oberoi and first cousin of actors Vivek Oberoi and Akshay Oberoi.

== Tennis career ==
Uberoi began playing at age 5 and at age 9 moved with her sister, Shikha Uberoi to attend Saddlebrook Tennis Academy in Tampa, Florida. At 16 years old, she attended her freshman year at Princeton University, where she was All-Ivy League Rookie of the Year in 2003 and named an All-American in singles and doubles the same year. She took a 6-year leave of absence from Princeton University to play on the World Tennis Association tour.

Neha started playing on the ITF Women's Circuit in the year 2000, and played exclusively in ITF tournaments until 2003, with limited results. She played in her first WTA-level tournament at the Advanta Championships of Philadelphia in October 2003, losing to Sandra Klösel in the first qualifying round. She next participated in (and won her first match at) a WTA tournament in February 2004 at the Hyderabad Open, where she defeated Lauren Breadmore, Darija Jurak and sister Shikha in the qualifying, only to lose to Maria Kirilenko in the main draw. After this, she competed in the Miami Masters, the biggest tournament of her career yet; as a wildcard in the qualifying, she fell to Tara Snyder. She would then lose her qualifying match at the Family Circle Cup to Catalina Castaño. She did manage to win her opening match at the Budapest Grand Prix qualifiers, against Zsuzsanna Fodor, but lost to Stéphanie Foretz in the following match. Uberoi played her first Grand Slam tournament at the 2004 US Open, where she was a wildcard into the qualifying, but was defeated by Cory Ann Avants in three tight sets. She mostly played on ITF Women's Circuit tournaments for the rest of the season. In June 2004, Neha also finished as a runner-up in the ITF $10,000 tournament in Fort Worth, Texas, losing in the final to sister Shikha; this would be the only singles final she reached in her career (across both the ITF and the WTA tours).

Uberoi began her 2005 season at the Gold Coast Open in January, failing to win her first match against Liu Nannan. In February, at the Abierto Mexicano Telcel, she won against Edina Gallovits and Ruxandra Dragomir, but couldn't win in the qualifying competition against Julie Ditty. She participated in the Miami Masters' main draw for the first time as a wildcard, losing to Galina Voskoboeva. She also couldn't qualify for the Bausch & Lomb Championships and the Family Circle Cup, and had mixed results on the rest of the clay court season (in ITF tournaments). After playing in numerous ITF events, she played a handful of tournaments at the North American hard court swing. She managed to reach the qualifying finals of both the Cincinnati Masters and the Bank of the West Classic, but couldn't advance to the main draw. With opening losses at both the JPMorgan Chase Open and Canadian Open, she went into the 2005 US Open. She had a strong win against Shiho Hisamatsu in the qualifying round one, but was defeated by Jennifer Hopkins after that. For the rest of the season, she only won one match across four WTA tournaments, losing early in the Sunfeast Open, the Guangzhou Open, the Tashkent Open, and the Hasselt Open. Neha did have a successful year in doubles, reaching two WTA finals partnering sister Shikha.

The Copa Colsanitas was her first WTA tournament of the 2006 season she played in. She had three wins over Carla Tiene, Estefanía Craciún, and Tina Schiechtl, but fell to Sara Errani in the main draw. Later, in March 2006, she also qualified for the Qatar Open, where she also lost in round one (to Marion Bartoli). She did advance to the second main round of the Family Circle Cup as a wildcard, where she beat Lisa Raymond. Although she fell in the qualifying of the Grand Prix de SAR La Princesse Lalla Meryem during the clay court swing, she entered as a lucky loser, where she managed to win a match against Selima Sfar. After competing in many WTA and ITF tournaments, she would play a WTA main draw at the 2006 Canadian Open, where she was defeated by Cara Black. She would go on to lose at the US Open as well. In doubles, Neha reached two ITF finals (in Troy, Alabama, and Augusta, Georgia) in October 2006, both with Chanelle Scheepers; the pair lost both of the finals.

Neha began 2007 at the Australian Open, where she overcame Viktoria Kutuzova in round one qualifying; next, she would ultimately lose to Sandra Záhlavová. She also failed to qualify for the Pattaya Open, the Sony Ericsson International, the Dubai Tennis Championships, and the Qatar Ladies Open. After playing in a few ITF tournaments, she also couldn't qualify for the Estoril Open and the Prague Open later that year during the clay court season. However, she managed to turn around a season of early losses to win three matches (two in qualifying, one in the main draw – entered as a Lucky Loser) at the Grand Prix de SAR La Princesse Lalla Meryem in May (defeating Kelly Liggan, Leanne Baker, and Sorana Cîrstea). Until the Sunfeast Open, she had mediocre results on both the ITF and WTA tours but managed to make the main draw there, losing to Maria Kirilenko, which would turn out to be her last singles match on the WTA Tour.

Uberoi played her last singles match in late June 2009 at the ITF $10,000 tournament in Wichita, Kansas, losing in the first round to Courtney Dolehide. Her final doubles match was at the same tournament also, losing to Megan Broderick and Anastasia Kharchenko in round one (playing with sister Nikita).

== World Tennis Association Tour Finals ==
=== Doubles (0–2) ===
Winner – Legend (pre/post 2009)
Grand Slam tournaments
WTA Tour Championships
Tier I / Premier Mandatory & Premier 5
Tier II / Premier
Tier III, IV & V / International

Outcome	No.	Date	Tournament	Surface	Partner	Opponents in the final	Score in final
Runner-up	1.	25 September 2005	Sunfeast Open, Kolkata, India	Hard	(India) Shikha Uberoi	(Russia) Elena Likhovtseva (Russia) Anastasia Myskina	1–6, 0–6
Runner-up	2.	2 October 2005	Guangzhou Open, China	Hard	(India) Shikha Uberoi	(Italy) Maria Elena Camerin (Switzerland) Emmanuelle Gagliardi	6–7^{(5–7)}, 3–6

== ITF finals (0-4) ==
=== Singles (0–1) ===
Legend $100,000 tournaments $75,000 tournaments $50,000 tournaments $25,000 tournaments $10,000 tournaments	Finals by surface Hard (0–1) Clay (0–0) Grass (0–0) Carpet (0–0)

Outcome	No.	Date	Tournament	Surface	Opponent	Score
Runner-up	1.	20 June 2004	Fort Worth, United States	Hard	(India) Shikha Uberoi	1–6, 2–6

=== Doubles (0–3) ===
Legend $100,000 tournaments $75,000 tournaments $50,000 tournaments $25,000 tournaments $15,000 tournaments $10,000 tournaments	Finals by surface Hard (0–3) Clay (0–0) Grass (0–0) Carpet (0–0)

Outcome	No.	Date	Tournament	Surface	Partner	Opponents	Score
Runner-up	1.	20 June 2004	Fort Worth, United States	Hard	(India) Shikha Uberoi	(United States) Vania King (Republic of Ireland) Anne Mall	6–2, 3–6, 6–7^{(5–7)}
Runner-up	2.	8 October 2006	Troy, United States	Hard	(South Africa) Chanelle Scheepers	(Australia) Nicole Kriz (New Zealand) Leanne Baker	7–6^{(7–1)}, 5–7, 3–6
Runner-up	3.	29 October 2006	Augusta, United States	Hard	(South Africa) Chanelle Scheepers	(Australia) Nicole Kriz (New Zealand) Leanne Baker	6–7^{(3–7)}, 1–6
