= Sophie Lefèvre =

French tennis player

- Country (sports): France
- Residence: Toulouse, France
- Born: 23 February 1981 (age 44); Toulouse
- Height: 1.70 m (5 ft 7 in)
- Turned pro: 1998
- Retired: 2013
- Plays: Right-handed
- Prize money: $244,824

Singles
- Career record: 196–227
- Career titles: 0
- Highest ranking: No. 216 (15 September 2003)

Grand Slam singles results
- French Open: 1R (1999, 2003)
- US Open: Q1 (2003)

Doubles
- Career record: 142–244
- Career titles: 4 ITF
- Highest ranking: No. 76 (21 February 2011)

Grand Slam doubles results
- Australian Open: 2R (2011)
- French Open: 2R (2007, 2008)
- Wimbledon: 2R (2011)

Sophie Lefèvre (born 23 February 1981 in Toulouse) is a retired French tennis player.

On 15 September 2003, she reached her career-high WTA ranking of 216 in singles. Her highest doubles ranking was 76, reached on 21 February 2011. Lefèvre retired from the WTA Tour in 2013.

She is co-founder and now director, with former Russian professional Maria Kondratieva, of KL Tennis Academy in Florida, United States.

== ITF finals ==
=== Singles (0–1) ===
Legend $100,000 tournaments $75,000 tournaments $50,000 tournaments $25,000 tournaments $10,000 tournaments	Finals by surface Hard (0–1) Clay (0–0) Grass (0–0) Carpet (0–0)

Outcome	No.	Date	Tournament	Surface	Opponent	Score
Runner-up	1.	20 January 2003	Grenoble, France	Hard (i)	(Croatia) Karolina Šprem	5–7, 5–7

=== Doubles (4–7) ===
Legend $100,000 tournaments $75,000 tournaments $50,000 tournaments $25,000 tournaments $10,000 tournaments	Finals by surface Hard (1–4) Clay (3–3) Grass (0–0) Carpet (0–0)

Outcome	No.	Date	Tournament	Surface	Partner	Opponents	Score
Runner-up	1.	3 February 2002	Belfort, France	Hard (i)	(France) Marina Caiazzo	(Germany) Kirstin Freye (Germany) Syna Schmidle	6–7^{(0–7)}, 4–6
Winner	1.	2 February 2003	Belfort, France	Hard (i)	(Netherlands) Kim Kilsdonk	(China) Liu Nannan (China) Xie Yanze	6–3, 6–3
Runner-up	2.	1 February 2004	Belfort, France	Hard (i)	(Netherlands) Kim Kilsdonk	(Czech Republic) Olga Vymetálková (Czech Republic) Gabriela Chmelinová	3–6, 2–6
Winner	2.	16 April 2006	Jackson, United States	Clay	(Russia) Maria Kondratieva	(Japan) Seiko Okamoto (Japan) Ayami Takase	6–0, 6–3
Winner	3.	30 April 2006	Cagnes-sur-Mer, France	Clay	(France) Aurélie Védy	(Austria) Daniela Klemenschits (Austria) Sandra Klemenschits	2–6, 6–4, 7–6^{(7–1)}
Winner	4.	18 August 2007	Penza, Russia	Clay	(Romania) Ágnes Szatmári	(Romania) Mihaela Buzărnescu (Ukraine) Veronika Kapshay	6–1, 6–2
Runner-up	3.	24 August 2007	Moscow, Russia	Clay	(Russia) Nina Bratchikova	(Russia) Maria Kondratieva (Serbia) Vesna Dolonc	2–6, 1–6
Runner-up	4.	1 February 2009	Grenoble, France	Hard (i)	(Russia) Maria Kondratieva	(France) Youlia Fedossova (France) Virginie Pichet	3–6, 3–6
Runner-up	5.	5 July 2009	Mont-de-Marsan, France	Clay	(Russia) Maria Kondratieva	(Argentina) Jorgelina Cravero (Argentina) María Irigoyen	6–2, 4–6, [7–10]
Runner-up	6.	24 July 2010	Pétange, Luxemburg	Clay	(France) Laura Thorpe	(Canada) Sharon Fichman (Romania) Monica Niculescu	4–6, 2–6
Runner-up	7.	30 October 2011	Poitiers, France	Hard (i)	(Russia) Maria Kondratieva	(France) Alizé Cornet (France) Virginie Razzano	3–6, 2–6
