= Liu Weijuan =

Chinese tennis player

- Country (sports): China
- Born: 28 February 1983 (age 43)
- Turned pro: 2000
- Retired: (last pro match 2006)
- Plays: Right-handed (two-handed backhand)
- Prize money: $6,939

Singles
- Career record: 41–27
- Career titles: 0 WTA, 0 ITF
- Highest ranking: 490 (1 November 2004)

Doubles
- Career record: 16–19
- Career titles: 0 WTA, 1 ITF
- Highest ranking: 442 (4 October 2004)

Liu Weijuan (born 28 February 1983) is a Chinese former professional tennis player. She won one doubles titles on the ITF Women's Circuit. Her career-high singles ranking is No. 490, achieved on 1 November 2004. Her career-high doubles ranking is No. 442, achieved on 4 October 2004.

Liu played at the 2005 Guangzhou International doubles event with Chen Yanchong but lost in the first round. She also played on some other WTA and ITF events.

== ITF finals ==
=== Singles (0–2) ===
$25,000 tournaments
$10,000 tournaments

Outcome	No.	Date	Tournament	Surface	Opponent	Score
Runner-up	1.	2 June 2002	Tianjin, China	Hard (i)	(Hong Kong) Tong Ka-po	3–6, 4–6
Runner-up	2.	11 August 2002	Nonthaburi, Thailand	Hard	(Australia) Deanna Roberts	4–6, 4–6

=== Doubles (1–1) ===
Outcome	No.	Date	Tournament	Surface	Partner	Opponents	Score
Runner-up	1.	19 May 2002	Shanghai, China	Hard	(China) He Chunyan	(Hong Kong) Yan Zi (China) Zheng Jie	2–6, 2–6
Winner	1.	28 July 2002	Chifeng, China	Clay	(China) He Chunyan	(China) Liu Jingjing (China) Yu Ying	3–6, 6–2, 7–6^{(7–4)}
