= Ji Chunmei =

Chinese tennis player

Ji Chunmei 季春美
- Country (sports): China
- Born: 14 February 1986 (age 39); Jiangsu, China
- Height: 1.72 m (5 ft 8 in)
- Turned pro: 2002
- Plays: Right-handed
- Prize money: $121,147

Singles
- Career record: 88–83
- Career titles: 0
- Highest ranking: No. 352 (10 May 2010)

Doubles
- Career record: 127–90
- Career titles: 1 WTA, 10 ITF
- Highest ranking: No. 61 (12 May 2008)

Grand Slam doubles results
- Australian Open: 2R (2008)
- French Open: 1R (2008)
- Wimbledon: 1R (2007, 2008)
- US Open: 1R (2007)

Team competitions
- Fed Cup: 1–0

Ji Chunmei (Chinese: 季春美; pinyin: Jì Chūnměi; Mandarin pronunciation: [tɕî ʈʂʰwə́n mèɪ]; born February 14, 1986) is a former professional Chinese tennis player.

Her highest WTA singles ranking is 352, which she reached on 10 May 2010. Her career-high in doubles is 61, which she reached on 12 May 2008.

== WTA career finals ==
=== Doubles: 2 (1 title, 1 runner-up) ===
Legend
Tier I
Tier II
Tier III, IV & V

Finals by surface
Hard (1–0)
Clay (0–1)
Carpet (0–0)

Result	Date	Tournament	Surface	Partner	Opponents	Score
Loss	13 May 2007	Prague Open, Czech Republic	Clay	(China) Sun Shengnan	(Czech Republic) Petra Cetkovská (Czech Republic) Andrea Hlaváčková	6–7^{(7–9)}, 2–6
Win	16 September 2007	Bali Tennis Classic, Indonesia	Hard	(China) Sun Shengnan	(United States) Jill Craybas (South Africa) Natalie Grandin	6–3, 6–2

== ITF Circuit finals ==
$100,000 tournaments
$75,000 tournaments
$50,000 tournaments
$25,000 tournaments
$10,000 tournaments

=== Singles: 2 (2 runner-ups) ===
Outcome	No.	Date	Tournament	Surface	Opponent	Score
Runner-up	1.	13 February 2006	ITF Shenzhen, China	Hard	(China) Zhang Shuai	1–6, 6–2, 1–6
Runner-up	2.	24 June 2006	ITF New Delhi, India	Hard	(China) Ren Jing	0–6, 7–6, 4–6

=== Doubles: 18 (10 titles, 8 runner-ups) ===
Outcome	No.	Date	Tournament	Surface	Partner	Opponents	Score
Winner	1.	4 April 2005	ITF Wuhan, China	Hard	(China) Yu Dan	(Indonesia) Ayu Fani Damayanti (Indonesia) Septi Mende	6–2, 6–4
Winner	2.	20 February 2006	ITF Shenzhen, China	Hard	(China) Chen Yanchong	(China) Hao Jie (China) Liang Chen	6–3, 6–0
Winner	3.	4 June 2006	ITF Tianjin, China	Hard	(China) Sun Shengnan	(Chinese Taipei) Chan Chin-wei (Chinese Taipei) Chen Yi	3–6, 7–6^{(7)}, 6–1
Runner-up	4.	23 July 2006	ITF Chongqing, China	Hard	(China) Sun Shengnan	(China) Ren Jing (China) Zhang Shuai	4–6, 3–6
Runner-up	5.	27 August 2006	ITF Nanjing, China	Hard	(China) Sun Shengnan	(Chinese Taipei) Chuang Chia-jung (China) Xie Yanze	1–6, 6–7^{(11)}
Winner	6.	29 October 2006	Beijing Challenger, China	Hard (i)	(China) Sun Shengnan	(New Zealand) Marina Erakovic (United States) Raquel Kops-Jones	6–2, 6–2
Winner	7.	5 November 2006	ITF Shanghai, China	Hard	(China) Sun Shengnan	(Uzbekistan) Akgul Amanmuradova (Uzbekistan) Iroda Tulyaganova	6–4, 7–5
Winner	8.	14 October 2007	ITF Beijing, China	Hard	(China) Sun Shengnan	(China) Liang Chen (China) Zhao Yijing	6–2, 6–3
Winner	9.	11 November 2007	ITF Taizhou, China	Hard	(China) Sun Shengnan	(China) Huang Lei (China) Zhang Shuai	7–6^{(5)}, 1–6, [13–11]
Runner-up	10.	2 December 2007	ITF Xiamen, China	Hard	(China) Sun Shengnan	(China) Han Xinyun (China) Xu Yifan	4–6, 5–7
Winner	11.	14 March 2008	ITF New Delhi, İndia	Hard	(China) Sun Shengnan	(United States) Sunitha Rao (France) Aurélie Védy	2–6, 6–2, [10–4]
Runner-up	12.	2 February 2009	ITF Mildura, Australia	Grass	(China) Han Xinyun	(China) Lu Jingjing (China) Sun Shengnan	7–6^{(2)}, 7–6^{(4)}
Winner	13.	16 February 2009	ITF Guangzhou, China	Hard	(China) Liang Chen	(China) Han Xinyun (China) Sun Shengnan	6–7^{(7)}, 6–2, [10–3]
Runner-up	14.	2 March 2009	ITF Sydney, Australia	Hard	(China) Han Xinyun	(Australia) Monique Adamczak (South Africa) Lizaan du Plessis	6–3, 7–5
Runner-up	15.	18 May 2009	ITF Incheon, South Korea	Hard	(China) Han Xinyun	(China) Lu Jingjing (China) Sun Shengnan	6–3, 7–5
Runner-up	16.	15 January 2010	ITF Pingguo, China	Hard	(China) Liu Wanting	(China) Xu Yifan (Chinese Taipei) Chan Chin-wei	3–6, 1–6
Winner	17.	21 February 2010	ITF Surprise, United States	Hard	(China) Xu Yifan	(United States) Christina Fusano (United States) Courtney Nagle	5–7, 6–2, [10–5]
Runner-up	18.	2 August 2010	Beijing Challenger, China	Hard	(China) Liu Wanting	(China) Sun Shengnan (China) Zhang Shuai	6–4, 2–6, [5–10]

== See also ==
- Chinese tennis players
- Tennis in China
