= Huang Lei (tennis) =

Chinese tennis player

- Country (sports): China
- Born: 10 March 1986 (age 39)
- Prize money: $32,516

Singles
- Career record: 83–69
- Career titles: 1 ITF
- Highest ranking: No. 382 (6 November 2006)

Doubles
- Career record: 40–39
- Career titles: 2 ITF
- Highest ranking: No. 228 (9 July 2007)

Huang Lei (born 10 March 1986) is a Chinese former professional tennis player.

Huang, while a student in Guangdong, represented China at the 2005 Summer Universiade, held in the Turkish city of İzmir.

On the professional tour, Huang reached a best singles ranking of 382 and won an ITF tournament in Tarakan in 2006.

Her WTA Tour main-draw appearances all came in doubles and included a quarterfinal appearance at the 2006 Guangzhou International Women's Open.

In 2007 she won two ITF doubles titles, one a $25,000 and the other a $50,000 tournament.

== ITF Circuit finals ==
$50,000 tournaments
$25,000 tournaments
$10,000 tournaments

=== Singles: 2 (1–1) ===
Outcome	No.	Date	Tournament	Surface	Opponent	Score
Runner-up	1.	7 September 2005	ITF Kyoto, Japan	Carpet	(Australia) Beti Sekulovski	2–6, 0–3 ret.
Winner	1.	10 May 2006	ITF Tarakan, Indonesia	Hard	(China) Chen Yi	7–5, 6–4

=== Doubles: 5 (2–3) ===
Outcome	No.	Date	Tournament	Surface	Partner	Opponents	Score
Runner-up	1.	2 May 2006	ITF Jakarta, Indonesia	Hard	(China) Xie Yanze	(Indonesia) Septi Mende (Indonesia) Ayu Fani Damayanti	4–6, 4–6
Runner-up	2.	12 May 2007	ITF Chengdu, China	Hard	(China) Xu Yifan	(China) Song Shanshan (China) Xie Yanze	3–6, 5–7
Winner	1.	8 June 2007	ITF Changsha, China	Hard	(China) Xu Yifan	(Chinese Taipei) Chan Chin-wei (Japan) Kumiko Iijima	6–3, 6–4
Winner	2.	16 June 2007	ITF Guangzhou, China	Hard	(China) Xu Yifan	(China) Chen Yanchong (China) Zhou Yimiao	6–2, 7–6^{(7–4)}
Runner-up	3.	11 November 2007	ITF Taizhou, China	Hard	(China) Zhang Shuai	(China) Sun Shengnan (China) Ji Chunmei	6–7^{(5–7)}, 6–1, [11–13]
