= Ren Jing =

Chinese tennis player

- Country (sports): China
- Born: 15 April 1987 (age 38)
- Turned pro: 2003
- Prize money: $26,272

Singles
- Career record: 51–39
- Career titles: 1 ITF
- Highest ranking: No. 256 (14 May 2007)

Doubles
- Career record: 23–18
- Career titles: 3 ITF
- Highest ranking: No. 224 (28 May 2007)

Ren Jing (Chinese: 任靖; pinyin: Rén Jìng) is a Chinese former professional tennis player.

Inher career, Ren won one singles title and three doubles titles on the ITF Women's Circuit. She reached the second round of the WTA Guangzhou event and lost in the first round as a qualifier of the WTA Tashkent tournament.

Her highest WTA singles ranking is 256, which she reached on 14 May 2007. Her career-high in doubles is world No. 224, achieved on 28 May 2007.

== ITF Circuit finals ==
Legend
$50,000 tournaments
$25,000 tournaments
$10,000 tournaments

=== Singles (1–1) ===
Outcome	No.	Date	Tournament	Surface	Opponent	Score
Winner	1.	24 June 2006	New Delhi, India	Hard	(China) Ji Chunmei	6–0, 6–7, 6–4
Runner-up	2.	30 April 2007	Chengdu, China	Hard	(China) Zhang Shuai	2–6, 7–6^{(7–5)}, 0–6

=== Doubles (3–0) ===
Outcome	No.	Date	Tournament	Surface	Partner	Opponents	Score
Winner	1.	16 July 2006	Chongqing, China	Hard	(China) Zhang Shuai	(China) Ji Chunmei (China) Sun Shengnan	6–4, 6–3
Winner	2.	26 July 2006	Chengdu, China	Hard	(China) Zhang Shuai	(China) Xia Huan (China) Xu Yifan	6–4, 6–2
Winner	3.	28 August 2006	Guangzhou, China	Hard	(China) Chen Yanchong	(Japan) Ayami Takase (Thailand) Montinee Tangphong	2–6, 6–4, 7–5
