= Hao Jie =

Chinese tennis player

- Country (sports): China
- Born: 16 October 1984 (age 42)
- Turned pro: 2001
- Plays: Right-handed (two-handed backhand)
- Prize money: $37,198

Singles
- Career record: 107–73
- Career titles: 0
- Highest ranking: No. 329 (21 May 2007)

Doubles
- Career record: 66–66
- Career titles: 2 ITF
- Highest ranking: No. 307 (1 November 2004)

Hao Jie (born 16 October 1984) is a Chinese former professional tennis player.

She won two doubles titles on the ITF Women's Circuit. Her career-high singles ranking is No. 329, achieved on 21 May 2007. Her best doubles ranking was 307 on 1 November 2004. She has been part of the China Fed Cup team.

Hao played at the Guangzhou International Open doubles event with Sun Tiantian, but lost in the first round. She played on many other WTA Tour and ITF events.

== ITF finals ==
$25,000 tournaments
$10,000 tournaments

=== Singles (0–2) ===
Outcome	No.	Date	Tournament	Surface	Opponent	Score
Runner-up	1.	10 April 2004	New Delhi, India	Hard	(Chinese Taipei) Chuang Chia-jung	3–6, 1–6
Runner-up	2.	11 July 2004	Seoul, South Korea	Hard	(South Korea) Lee Eun-jeong	4–6, 1–6

=== Doubles (2–5) ===
Outcome	No.	Date	Tournament	Surface	Partner	Opponents	Score
Runner-up	1.	3 April 2004	Mumbai, India	Hard	(China) Dong Yanhua	(China) Yang Shujing (China) Yu Ying	2–6, 2–6
Runner-up	2.	13 February 2006	Shenzhen, China	Hard	(China) Yang Shujing	(China) Liang Chen (China) Song Shanshan	5–7, 1–6
Runner-up	3.	20 February 2006	Shenzhen, China	Hard	(China) Liang Chen	(China) Chen Yanchong (China) Ji Chunmei	3–6, 0–6
Winner	4.	8 April 2007	Ho Chi Minh City, Vietnam	Hard	(China) Han Xinyun	(Japan) Kumiko Iijima (Japan) Seiko Okamoto	6–2, 1–6, 6–3
Runner-up	5.	12 May 2008	Bulungan, Indonesia	Hard	(Indonesia) Lavinia Tananta	(Indonesia) Lutfiana-Aris Budiharto (Indonesia) Beatrice Gumulya	5–7, 6–4, [9–11]
Winner	6.	9 February 2009	Jiangmen, China	Hard	(Chinese Taipei) Kao Shao-yuan	(China) Zhang Shuai (China) Xie Yanze	6–0, 7–5
Runner-up	7.	10 August 2009	Quanzhou, China	Hard	(China) Sun Tiantian	(China) Han Xinyun (Chinese Taipei) Kao Shao-yuan	6–1, 2–6, [6–10]
