= Yuan Meng =

Chinese tennis player

Yuan Meng 袁梦
- Country (sports): China
- Residence: Hong Kong, China
- Born: 9 May 1986 (age 39) Changsha, Hunan, China
- Height: 1.68 m (5 ft 6 in)
- Turned pro: 2003
- Retired: 2014
- Plays: Right-handed (two-handed backhand)
- Prize money: $398,170

Singles
- Career record: 224–176
- Career titles: 4 ITF
- Highest ranking: No. 86 (10 March 2008)

Grand Slam singles results
- Australian Open: 2R (2006, 2008)
- French Open: 1R (2006, 2008)
- Wimbledon: 1R (2006, 2008)
- US Open: 1R (2006)

Doubles
- Career record: 30–46
- Career titles: 1 ITF
- Highest ranking: No. 181 (28 August 2006)

Grand Slam doubles results
- French Open: 2R (2006)
- US Open: 1R (2006)

Yuan Meng (born 9 May 1986) (simplified Chinese: 袁梦; traditional Chinese: 袁夢; pinyin: Yuán Mèng) is a former Chinese professional tennis player. Yuan has won four singles titles and one doubles title on tournaments of the ITF Circuit.

== Career ==
=== 2001–2004 ===
Yuan began competing on the ITF Circuit at age 15 in May 2001. However, that year she lost in the first round of qualifying in all four events she entered, and ended the year still unranked. In 2002, she won seven matches in qualifying and one in a main draw, and finished the year ranked 984th. The following year, she won 11 matches in qualifying and five in main draws, and after reaching the final qualifying round for a $50k event at Shenzhen she finished the year world-ranked nearly 300 places higher, at 689th.

In March 2004, she reached the final of a $10k grass-court event at Yarrawonga, Australia, only to default to her last opponent. In early June, shortly after her eighteenth birthday, she reached the semifinal of a $25,000 event at Wulanhaote, before losing to more experienced countrywoman Liu Nannan. In December, she reached her first $25k tournament final at Port Pirie, before losing a tight three-set championship decider to a little-known Australian. Overall, she had won thirty-two matches in the year, lifting her world ranking to 387, up another 300 places year-on-year.

=== 2005 ===
Yuan's consistent upward progress through the rankings continued in 2005. In February, she reached the semifinal of a $50k hardcourt tournament at Bendigo, Australia. In March, she finally won her first career ITF singles title at the $10k grass-court event in Benalla, also in Australia. She performed solidly in several successive $25k tournaments over the Spring, reaching the semifinal at Campobasso, Italy in May with an impressive win over emerging Slovak star Jarmila Gajdošová (before losing to Mariya Koryttseva of Ukraine in three sets), and defeating Gajdosova in three once more, as well as the equally promising youngster Kaia Kanepi of Estonia, and the experienced Australian Christina Wheeler, in reaching the final at Grado in June. In August, she nearly qualified for the $50k Bronx Open after a fine three-set victory over Tatiana Poutchek, but lost in the deciding set in an extremely close qualifying-round match against German Angelika Bachmann.

In September, Yuan won her second career singles title and first $50k title at Beijing, defeating the highly competent top-150 player Vilmarie Castellvi 4–6, 6–4, 6–4 in the final. Then she finally qualified for her first WTA event at Guangzhou, but lost in the first round to Arantxa Parra-Santonja of Spain. In October, as a direct entrant to the WTA tournament at Bangkok, she impressed in defeating Aiko Nakamura and Sania Mirza (though the popular Indian starlet retired after losing the first set to Yuan), to win her first ever main-draw matches at a WTA event in reaching the quarter-final, where she took Gisela Dulko to three sets. Two further semifinal performances at $25k contests rounded off the Chinese teenager's best year to date, which saw her ascend another 234 places in the world rankings to 153rd, well within contention for qualifying for more WTA tournaments in the new year.

=== 2006 ===
2006 began well with the much-improved Chinese rising star qualifying for Gold Coast with wins over Cara Black, Kaia Kanepi (again) and Casey Dellacqua. But top 20 player Francesca Schiavone was a challenge too far in the main draw first round, defeating Yuan for the loss of just five games. Not one for being easily discouraged, she proceeded to come through qualifying for her fourth WTA Tour main draw and her first at Grand Slam level, the Australian Open, with straight-sets wins over Yulia Beygelzimer of Ukraine, Elena Baltacha of Great Britain and Bethanie Mattek of the United States. In the main draw, she defeated Melinda Czink 6–4, 6–2, then faced the world No. 2, Kim Clijsters, and took six games from her; but the result in the Belgian's favour was virtually a foregone conclusion. Still, these performances had lifted her dramatically to 108th in the world in just one month.

After a couple of disappointing qualifying losses in early February, to Vania King at Tokyo and Akgul Amanmuradova at Pattaya, Yuan next broke through in Memphis, defeating Christina Wheeler once more to gain the main draw, where she battled past talented Uzbekistan player Varvara Lepchenko in three sets before succumbing to the solid American Jill Craybas in round two. This performance was enough to restore her to a level-best world No. 108 as February came to a close.

Then at Indian Wells in March, she came through qualifying with impressive wins over Angela Haynes and (in three sets) Varvara Lepchenko, then advanced to round three of the main draw with straight-sets wins over Akiko Morigami and Catalina Castaño. Even if she does not win her third-round tie, the estimated 39 ranking points accrued from her performance so far will give her a very strong chance of edging just inside the world top 100 for the first time in her career in the week following the tournament.

=== 2007 ===
Yuan won her first 2007 main-draw match at Indian Wells, where she qualified and beat Frenchwoman Virginie Razzano in three sets. She then lost in two tight sets to Japanese veteran Ai Sugiyama. Two weeks later, she won a $25k tournament in Hammond, Louisiana.

While Yuan struggled during the clay-court- and grass-court season, she won a few main draw matches in the hardcourt season. She defeated Casey Dellacqua of Australia in Cincinnati, eighth-seeded Russian Yaroslava Shvedova in Bali, Marina Erakovic of New Zealand in Seoul, and fourth-seeded Japanese Ai Sugiyama in Tokyo. This win over 37th-ranked Sugiyama was Yuan's best win of the season.

=== 2008 ===
In July, Yuan won three matches to reach the quarterfinals of the East West Bank Classic in Carson, California where she lost to wildcard Bethanie Mattek of the U.S., 2–6, 5–7. As a result, her world singles ranking jumped 24 places, from No. 122 to 98. Later that month, as a qualifier at the Rogers Cup in Montreal, she had to quit in the first round against ninth seed Patty Schnyder because of a left thigh injury, 7–6, 3–2 (ret.).

In August, Yuan was the top seed in the US Open women's singles qualifying tournament, but she lost in the qualifying first round to unseeded Hana Šromová of the Czech Republic, 3–6, 2–6.

=== 2009 ===
In January's Australian Open women's singles, Yuan lost 3–6, 2–6 to No. 2 seed and eventual champion, Serena Williams, in the first round.

In May's French Open women's singles, Yuan lost 0-6, 6-3, 3-6, to Masa Zec-Peskiric.

=== 2014 ===
In 2014, Yuan Meng retired from professional tennis at the age of 27 (see 2014 WTA Tour).

== ITF finals ==
Legend
$50,000 tournaments
$25,000 tournaments
$10,000 tournaments

=== Singles: 7 (4–3) ===
Outcome	No.	Date	Tournament	Surface	Opponent	Score
Runner-up	1.	15 March 2004	Yarrawonga, Australia	Grass	(New Zealand) Paula Marama	w/o
Runner-up	2.	8 November 2004	Port Pirie, Australia	Hard	(Australia) Tiffany Welford	5–7, 6–2, 7–5
Winner	1.	7 March 2005	Benalla, Australia	Grass	(New Zealand) Marina Erakovic	6–4, 6–4
Runner-up	3.	6 June 2005	Grado, Italy	Clay	(Belarus) Tatsiana Uvarova	6–4, 6–4
Winner	2.	5 September 2005	Beijing, China	Carpet	(Puerto Rico) Vilmarie Castellvi	4–6, 6–4, 6–4
Winner	3.	6 November 2006	Shenzhen, China	Hard	(Uzbekistan) Iroda Tulyaganova	4–6, 7–5, 6–1
Winner	4.	27 March 2007	Hammond, United States	Hard	(United States) Madison Brengle	6–2, 6–2

=== Doubles: 2 (1–1) ===
Outcome	No.	Date	Tournament	Surface	Partner	Opponents	Score
Runner-up	1.	19 July 2004	ITF Horb, Germany	Clay	(Czech Republic) Janette Bejlková	(Russia) Maria Arkhipova (Israel) Yevgenia Savransky	6–4, 6–3
Winner	1.	7 March 2005	ITF Benalla, Australia	Grass	(Russia) Julia Efremova	(Australia) Lauren Cheung (Australia) Lisa d'Amelio	6–4, 6–3

== Performance timelines ==
Key
W	F	SF	QF	#R	RR	Q#	DNQ	A	NH

(W) winner; (F) finalist; (SF) semifinalist; (QF) quarterfinalist; (#R) rounds 4, 3, 2, 1; (RR) round-robin stage; (Q#) qualification round; (DNQ) did not qualify; (A) absent; (NH) not held; (SR) strike rate (events won / competed); (W–L) win–loss record.

=== Singles ===
Tournament	2002	2003	2004	2005	2006	2007	2008	2009	Career SR	Career win–loss
Grand Slam tournaments
Australian Open	A	A	A	A	2R	1R	2R	1R	0 / 4	2–4
French Open	A	A	A	A	1R	Q3	1R	Q1	0 / 2	0–2
Wimbledon	A	A	A	A	1R	Q1	1R	Q2	0 / 2	0–2
US Open	A	A	A	Q1	1R	Q1	Q1	–	0 / 1	0–1
SR	0 / 0	0 / 0	0 / 0	0 / 0	0 / 4	0 / 1	0 / 3	0 / 1	0 / 9	
Win–loss	0–0	0–0	0–0	0–0	1–4	0–1	1–3	0–1		2–9

=== Doubles ===
Tournament	2002	2003	2004	2005	2006	2007	2008	Career SR	Career win–loss
Grand Slam tournaments
Australian Open	A	A	A	A	A	A	A	0 / 0	0–0
French Open	A	A	A	A	2R	A	A	0 / 1	1–1
Wimbledon	A	A	A	A	A	A	A	0 / 0	0–0
US Open	A	A	A	A	1R	A	A	0 / 1	0–1
SR	0 / 0	0 / 0	0 / 0	0 / 0	0 / 2	0 / 0	0 / 0	0 / 2	
Win–loss	0–0	0–0	0–0	0–0	1–2	0–0	0–0		1–2

== See also ==
- Chinese tennis players
- Tennis in China
