= Xie Yanze =

Chinese tennis player

- Country (sports): China
- Born: January 11, 1984 (age 42)
- Turned pro: 2003
- Plays: Right (two-handed backhand)
- Prize money: $101,474

Singles
- Career record: 163–99
- Career titles: 6 ITF
- Highest ranking: No. 184 (7 June 2004)

Doubles
- Career record: 97–71
- Career titles: 7 ITF
- Highest ranking: No. 149 (27 September 2004)

Xie Yanze (born 11 January 1984) is a Chinese former professional tennis player.

In her career, she won six singles and seven doubles titles on the ITF Women's Circuit. On 7 June 2004, she reached her best singles ranking of world No. 184. On 27 September 2004, she peaked at No. 149 in the WTA doubles rankings.

In 2005, Xie along with Peng Shuai, reached the semifinals at the Guangzhou International Open, losing to Neha Uberoi and Shikha Uberoi.

== ITF Circuit finals ==
=== Singles: 16 (6 titles, 10 runner-ups) ===
Legend
$75,000 tournaments
$50,000 tournaments
$25,000 tournaments
$10,000 tournaments

Result	No.	Date	Tournament	Surface	Opponent	Score
Loss	1.	26 May 2002	ITF Tianjin, China	Hard (i)	(China) Zheng Jie	1–6, 2–6
Win	2.	4 August 2002	ITF Tongliao, China	Hard	(China) Rui Du	6–3, 6–1
Win	3.	8 June 2003	ITF Seoul, Korea	Hard	(South Korea) Jeon Mi-ra	6–3, 6–4
Loss	4.	2 November 2003	ITF Beijing, China	Hard (i)	(Japan) Yuka Yoshida	1–6, 6–7^{(2)}
Win	5.	9 November 2003	ITF Taizhou, China	Hard	(Slovakia) Lenka Tvarošková	6–1, 6–4
Loss	6.	11 January 2005	ITF Tampa, United States	Hard	(Romania) Anda Perianu	5–7, 7–5, 4–6
Loss	7.	23 January 2005	ITF Miami, United States	Hard	(Argentina) Clarisa Fernández	4–6, 2–6
Win	8.	17 April 2005	ITF Changsha, China	Hard	(China) Yu Ying	6–1, 6–1
Win	9.	5 June 2005	ITF Nanjing, China	Hard	(Austria) Daniela Kix	6–2, 6–2
Loss	10.	28 May 2006	ITF Beijing, China	Hard	(Hungary) Anikó Kapros	4–6, 2–6
Loss	11.	30 May 2006	ITF Tianjin, China	Hard	(China) Zhang Shuai	2–6, 6–3, 0–6
Loss	12.	21 August 2006	ITF Nanjing, China	Hard	(China) Zhang Shuai	3–6, 6–1, 4–6
Loss	13.	27 April 2008	ITF Incheon, Korea	Hard	(Chinese Taipei) Hsieh Su-wei	1–6, 1–6
Win	14.	5 May 2008	ITF Changwon, Korea	Hard	(Russia) Alexandra Panova	6–4, 6–4
Loss	15.	7 September 2008	ITF Tsukuba, Japan	Hard	(Chinese Taipei) Hsieh Su-wei	6–4, 3–6, 0–6
Loss	16.	9 February 2009	ITF Jiangmen, China	Hard	(China) Duan Yingying	2–6, 4–6

=== Doubles: 13 (7 titles, 6 runner-ups) ===
Result	No.	Date	Tournament	Surface	Partner	Opponents	Score
Loss	1.	3 June 2001	ITF Baotou, China	Clay	(China) Ma Enyue	(South Korea) Choi Jin-young (South Korea) Kim Mi-ok	3–6, 3–6
Win	2.	15 July 2001	ITF Tianjin, China	Clay	(China) Ma Enyue	(China) Peng Shuai (China) Liu Nannan	7–5, 5–7, 6–4
Loss	3.	27 February 2003	ITF Belfort, France	Carpet (i)	(China) Liu Nannan	(Netherlands) Kim Kilsdonk (France) Sophie Lefèvre	3–6, 3–6
Win	4.	9 November 2003	ITF Taizhou, China	Hard	(China) Peng Shuai	(China) Yang Shujing (China) Yu Ying	6–3, 4–6, 6–2
Win	5.	25 January 2004	ITF Boca Raton, United States	Hard	(China) Peng Shuai	(United States) Allison Bradshaw (United States) Julie Ditty	6–1, 6–2
Loss	6.	25 April 2004	Dothan Pro Classic, United States	Clay	(China) Peng Shuai	(Australia) Lisa McShea (Venezuela) Milagros Sequera	7–6^{(6)}, 4–6, 2–6
Loss	7.	6 June 2004	ITF Prostejov, Czech Republic	Clay	(China) Peng Shuai	(Czech Republic) Libuše Průšová (Czech Republic) Barbora Záhlavová-Strýcová	1–6, 3–6
Win	8.	5 June 2005	ITF Nanjing, China	Hard	(Chinese Taipei) Chuang Chia-jung	(Argentina) María José Argeri (Brazil) Letícia Sobral	6–3, 6–7^{(5)}, 6–2
Win	9.	21 August 2005	ITF Nanjing, China	Hard	(Russia) Julia Efremova	(Japan) Tomoko Sugano (Japan) Akiko Yonemura	6–4, 6–3
Loss	10.	2 May 2006	ITF Jakarta, Indonesia	Hard	(China) Huang Lei	(Indonesia) Septi Mende (Indonesia) Ayu Fani Damayanti	4–6, 4–6
Win	11.	21 August 2006	ITF Nanjing, China	Hard	(Chinese Taipei) Chuang Chia-jung	(Indonesia) Ji Chunmei (Indonesia) Sun Shengnan	6–1, 7–6^{(11)}
Win	12.	12 May 2007	ITF Chengdu, China	Hard	(China) Song Shanshan	(China) Xu Yifan (China) Huang Lei	6–3, 7–5
Loss	13.	9 February 2009	ITF Jiangmen, China	Hard	(China) Zhang Shuai	(China) Hao Jie (Chinese Taipei) Kao Shao-yuan	0–6, 5–7
