= Guangzhou International Women's Open =

Guangzhou Open
- 2026 Guangzhou Open

WTA Tour
- Founded: 2004; 22 years ago
- Location: Guangzhou; China
- Venue: Nansha International Tennis Center (2023–present); Tianhe Sports Center (2006–2008, 2011–14, 2019); Guangdong Olympic Tennis Centre (2015–2018); Guangzhou International Tennis Center (2009–10); Fangcun Tennis Sports Center (2004–05)
- Category: WTA 250
- Surface: Hard - outdoors
- Draw: 32S / 24Q / 16D
- Prize money: US$283,347 (2026)
- Website: guangzhouopen.org

Current champions (2026)
- Singles: (United Kingdom) Harriet Dart
- Doubles: (Uzbekistan) Polina Kudermetova (Uzbekistan) Maria Timofeeva

The Guangzhou Open (Chinese: 广州国际女子网球公开赛; pinyin: Guǎngzhōu Guójì Nǚzǐ Wǎngqiú Gōngkāi Sài; formerly the Guangzhou International Women's Open) is a tennis tournament held in Guangzhou, People's Republic of China. Held since 2004, the inaugural tournament had Li Na as the first Chinese singles title winner.

== Past finals ==
=== Singles ===
Year	Champion	Runner-up	Score
↓ Tier III ↓
2004	(China) Li Na	(Slovakia) Martina Suchá	6–3, 6–4
2005	(China) Yan Zi	(Spain) Nuria Llagostera Vives	6–4, 4–0 retired
2006	(Russia) Anna Chakvetadze	(Spain) Anabel Medina Garrigues	6–1, 6–4
2007	(France) Virginie Razzano	(Israel) Tzipora Obziler	6–0, 6–3
2008	(Russia) Vera Zvonareva	(China) Peng Shuai	6–7^{(4–7)}, 6–0, 6–2
↓ WTA International ↓
2009	(Israel) Shahar Pe'er	(Italy) Alberta Brianti	6–3, 6–4
2010	(Australia) Jarmila Groth	(Russia) Alla Kudryavtseva	6–1, 6–4
2011	(South Africa) Chanelle Scheepers	(Slovakia) Magdalena Rybáriková	6–2, 6–2
2012	(Chinese Taipei) Hsieh Su-wei	(United Kingdom) Laura Robson	6–3, 5–7, 6–4
2013	(China) Zhang Shuai	(United States) Vania King	7–6^{(7–1)}, 6–1
2014	(Romania) Monica Niculescu	(France) Alizé Cornet	6–4, 6–0
2015	(Serbia) Jelena Janković	(Czech Republic) Denisa Allertová	6–2, 6–0
2016	(Ukraine) Lesia Tsurenko	(Serbia) Jelena Janković	6–4, 3–6, 6–4
2017	(China) Zhang Shuai (2)	(Serbia) Aleksandra Krunić	6–2, 3–6, 6–2
2018	(China) Wang Qiang	(Kazakhstan) Yulia Putintseva	6–1, 6–2
2019	(United States) Sofia Kenin	(Australia) Samantha Stosur	6–7^{(4–7)}, 6–4, 6–2
2020	Initially rescheduled to November, but later cancelled, due to the COVID-19 pandemic		
↓ WTA 250 ↓
2021–2022	cancelled due to the COVID-19 pandemic		
2023	(China) Wang Xiyu	(Poland) Magda Linette	6–0, 6–2
2024	(Serbia) Olga Danilović	(United States) Caroline Dolehide	6–3, 6–1
2025	(United States) Ann Li	(New Zealand) Lulu Sun	7–6^{(8–6)}, 6–2
2026	(United Kingdom) Harriet Dart	(Austria) Lilli Tagger	4–6, 6–3, 6–4

=== Doubles ===
Year	Champions	Runners-up	Score
2004	(China) Li Ting (China) Sun Tiantian	(China) Yang Shujing (China) Yu Ying	6–4, 6–1
2005	(Italy) Maria Elena Camerin (Switzerland) Emmanuelle Gagliardi	(United States) Neha Uberoi (India) Shikha Uberoi	7–6^{(7–5)}, 6–3
2006	(China) Li Ting (2) (China) Sun Tiantian (2)	(United States) Vania King (Croatia) Jelena Kostanić	6–4, 2–6, 7–5
2007	(China) Peng Shuai (China) Yan Zi	(United States) Vania King (China) Sun Tiantian	6–3, 6–4
2008	(Ukraine) Mariya Koryttseva (Belarus) Tatiana Poutchek	(China) Sun Tiantian (China) Yan Zi	6–3, 4–6, [10–8]
2009	(Belarus) Olga Govortsova (Belarus) Tatiana Poutchek (2)	(Japan) Kimiko Date-Krumm (China) Sun Tiantian	3–6, 6–2, [10–8]
2010	(Romania) Edina Gallovits (India) Sania Mirza	(China) Han Xinyun (China) Liu Wanting	7–5, 6–3
2011	(Chinese Taipei) Hsieh Su-wei (China) Zheng Saisai	(Chinese Taipei) Chan Chin-wei (China) Han Xinyun	6–2, 6–1
2012	(Thailand) Tamarine Tanasugarn (China) Zhang Shuai	(Australia) Jarmila Gajdošová (Romania) Monica Niculescu	2–6, 6–2, [10–8]
2013	(Chinese Taipei) Hsieh Su-wei (2) (China) Peng Shuai (2)	(United States) Vania King (Kazakhstan) Galina Voskoboeva	6–3, 4–6, [12–10]
2014	(Chinese Taipei) Chuang Chia-jung (China) Liang Chen	(France) Alizé Cornet (Poland) Magda Linette	2–6, 7–6^{(7–3)}, [10–7]
2015	(Switzerland) Martina Hingis (India) Sania Mirza (2)	(China) Xu Shilin (China) You Xiaodi	6–3, 6–1
2016	(United States) Asia Muhammad (China) Peng Shuai (3)	(Belarus) Olga Govortsova (Belarus) Vera Lapko	6–2, 7–6^{(7–3)}
2017	(Belgium) Elise Mertens (Netherlands) Demi Schuurs	(Australia) Monique Adamczak (Australia) Storm Sanders	6–2, 6–3
2018	(Australia) Monique Adamczak (Australia) Jessica Moore	(Montenegro) Danka Kovinić (Belarus) Vera Lapko	4–6, 7–5, [10–4]
2019	(China) Peng Shuai (4) (Germany) Laura Siegemund	(Chile) Alexa Guarachi (Mexico) Giuliana Olmos	6–2, 6–1
2020	Initially rescheduled to November, but later cancelled, due to the COVID-19 pandemic		
2021-2022	cancelled due to the COVID-19 pandemic		
2023	(China) Guo Hanyu (China) Jiang Xinyu	(Japan) Eri Hozumi (Japan) Makoto Ninomiya	6–3, 7–6^{(7–4)}
2024	(Czech Republic) Kateřina Siniaková (China) Zhang Shuai (2)	(Poland) Katarzyna Piter (Hungary) Fanny Stollár	6–4, 6–1
2025	(Poland) Katarzyna Piter (Indonesia) Janice Tjen	(Hong Kong) Eudice Chong (Chinese Taipei) Liang En-shuo	3–6, 6–3, [10–5]
2026	(Uzbekistan) Polina Kudermetova (Uzbekistan) Maria Timofeeva	(Chinese Taipei) Cho I-hsuan (Chinese Taipei) Cho Yi-tsen	7–5, 7–6^{(7–1)}
