= Liu Nannan =

Chinese tennis player

- Country (sports): China
- Born: 19 June 1983 (age 41)
- Height: 1.76 m (5 ft 9 1/2 in)
- Turned pro: 2001
- Retired: 2011
- Plays: Left-handed
- Prize money: $91,463

Singles
- Career record: 140–64
- Career titles: 5 ITF
- Highest ranking: No. 141 (25 April 2005)

Grand Slam singles results
- Australian Open: 1R (2005)
- French Open: Q1 (2005)
- US Open: 1R (2004)

Doubles
- Career record: 45–41
- Career titles: 2 ITF
- Highest ranking: No. 203 (2 May 2005)

Liu Nannan (simplified Chinese: 刘南楠; traditional Chinese: 劉南楠; pinyin: Liú Nánnán; born June 19, 1983) is a former Chinese tennis player.

== Career ==
Starting in 2001, Nannan has enjoyed considerable success on the ITF Women's Circuit, and occasionally qualified for WTA Tour events. Though her success at the WTA level of the game has so far fallen short of the stellar heights, achieved by some of her Chinese contemporaries such as Peng Shuai, Li Na, Zheng Jie, Sun Tiantian and Yan Zi, she has come close enough at times for future hope of stronger results to justifiably abide.

In March 2001, she came through qualifying to win a $25k tournament at Hangzhou, defeating Akiko Morigami, Zheng Jie and Rika Fujiwara in the last three rounds. In July, she won a $10,000 tournament at Tianjin, defeating Peng Shuai in the semi-final; and later the same month she was the losing finalist to Li Na in the $25,000 tournament at Guangzhou. She ended the year ranked world No. 275.

In January 2002, she won back-to-back $10k tournaments in the UK, at Hull and Tipton, but suffered mixed results for the remainder of the year, losing in numerous quarter-finals and semifinals, and finished it world-ranked slighter lower, at 297.

2003 was a relatively poor year for Liu as a singles player until December, when she reached the quarterfinal of a $50k tournament at Shenzhen with a clean run of five straight sets wins in qualifying and the main draw, only to cede victory to Zheng Jie by default. Not even this run could stop her year-end ranking from falling outside the top 400, at 401.

2004 was Liu's most successful year to date as a singles player. She began it by winning a $10k tournament at Tampa, Florida, the fifth ITF singles title of her career. In June, she was the losing finalist to Li Na at a $25k tournament at Wulanhaote, and losing semi-finalist to Li Na at a $50k tournament at Beijing. In July, she came through qualifying to reach the semifinal at another $50k tournament, at Lexington, Kentucky with wins over Shikha Uberoi, Rika Fujiwara and Aiko Nakamura. In August, she defeated future star Jarmila Gajdošová in the first round of another $50k tournament at Louisville, Kentucky, then came through qualifying to the main draw of her first Grand Slam tournament, the US Open, only to lose to Paola Suárez. In September, she also qualified for the WTA tournament at Guangzhou, but lost in the first round after a close contest with Kristina Brandi. She ended the year ranked 170th, up 231 places year-on-year.

Early in 2005, Liu continued to play some of her best tennis, qualifying for Hobart with wins over Sofia Arvidsson and Maureen Drake (only to lose in the first round to Gisela Dulko) and for the Australian Open with a win over Yuka Yoshida (only to be ousted from the main draw at the first hurdle by Vera Zvonareva). In April, she reached the semifinal of a $75k tournament at Dothan, Alabama, losing to Varvara Lepchenko. This brought up her world ranking to a high point of 145. She was destined to lose her opening match at four of the next five events she entered, the only exception being a $50k tournament at Beijing in June, where she reached the semifinal before conceding a walkover to Li Ting. Since losing to Lepchenko once more in the first round of qualifying for Los Angeles, early in August 2005, Liu has not played another singles match.

== ITF Circuit finals ==
$50,000 tournaments
$25,000 tournaments
$10,000 tournaments

=== Singles (5–4) ===
| Outcome | No. | Date | Tournament | Surface | Opponent | Score |
|---|---|---|---|---|---|---|
| Winner | 1. | 5 March 2001 | Hangzhou, China | Hard | (Japan) Rika Fujiwara | 7–6^{(2)}, 3–6, 7–5 |
| Runner-up | 2. | 15 July 2001 | Tianjin, China | Hard | (China) Peng Shuai | 0–1 ret. |
| Winner | 3. | 22 July 2001 | Tianjin, China | Hard | (China) Yao Lan | 6–4, 6–3 |
| Runner-up | 4. | 29 July 2001 | Guangzhou, China | Hard | (China) Li Na | 1–6, 2–6 |
| Winner | 5. | 27 January 2002 | Hull, United Kingdom | Hard (i) | (China) Yan Zi | 6–1, 6–2 |
| Winner | 6. | 29 January 2002 | Tipton, United Kingdom | Hard (i) | (Russia) Ekaterina Sysoeva | 4–6, 7–5, 6–4 |
| Winner | 7. | 18 January 2004 | Tampa, United States | Hard | (United States) Kristen Schlukebir | 6–3, 6–1 |
| Runner-up | 8. | 18 January 2004 | Boca Raton, United States | Hard | (United States) Kelly McCain | 1–6, 6–3, 0–6 |
| Runner-up | 9. | 6 June 2004 | Wulanhaote, China | Hard | (China) Li Na | 0–6, 0–6 |

=== Doubles (2–4) ===
| Outcome | No. | Date | Tournament | Surface | Partnering | Opponents | Score |
|---|---|---|---|---|---|---|---|
| Runner-up | 1. | 15 July 2001 | Tianjin, China | Clay | (China) Peng Shuai | (China) Ma Enyue (China) Xie Yanze | 5–7, 7–5, 4–6 |
| Winner | 2. | 4 June 2001 | Shenzhen, China | Hard | (China) Peng Shuai | (China) Li Ting (China) Lui-Li Shen | 6–4, 6–1 |
| Runner-up | 3. | 27 February 2003 | Belfort, France | Carpet | (China) Xie Yanze | (Netherlands) Kim Kilsdonk (France) Sophie Lefèvre | 3–6, 3–6 |
| Runner-up | 4. | 23 May 2004 | Beijing, China | Hard | (China) Du Rui | (Latvia) Līga Dekmeijere (Turkey) İpek Şenoğlu | 6–4, 4–6, 6–7^{(1)} |
| Runner-up | 5. | 6 June 2004 | Wulanhaote, China | Hard | (China) Du Rui | (Chinese Taipei) Chuang Chia-jung (Thailand) Napaporn Tongsalee | 6–3, 2–6, 3–6 |
| Winner | 6. | 22 August 2004 | Bronx, United States | Hard | (China) Li Na | (United States) Jessica Lehnhoff (Australia) Christina Wheeler | 5–7, 6–3, 6–3 |

== See also ==
- Tennis in China
