= Chen Yanchong =

Chinese tennis player (born 1987)

- Native name: 陈燕翀
- Country (sports): China
- Residence: Guangzhou, Guangdong
- Born: 10 April 1987 (age 37); Hengyang, Hunan
- Turned pro: 2002
- Plays: Right (two-handed backhand)
- Prize money: $66,332

Singles
- Career record: 104–83
- Career titles: 3 ITF
- Highest ranking: No. 187 (6 November 2006)

Grand Slam singles results
- Australian Open: Q1 (2007)

Doubles
- Career record: 79–69
- Career titles: 4 ITF
- Highest ranking: No. 157 (6 November 2006)

Chen Yanchong (Chinese: 陈燕翀; pinyin: Chén Yànchōng; Mandarin pronunciation: [ʈʂʰə̌n jɛ̂n ʈʂʰʊ́ŋ]; born 10 April 1987) is a former tennis player from the People's Republic of China.

A member of the Chinese Olympic team in 2003, Chen is the best tennis player of the Guangdong team, with a ranking of the 14th best Chinese player overall.

Her highest singles ranking by the WTA is 187, which she reached on 6 November 2006. Her career-high in doubles is 157, achieved on 6 November 2006. In her career, Chen won three singles titles and four doubles titles on the ITF Women's Circuit.

== ITF finals ==
=== Singles (3–2) ===
Legend
$50,000 tournaments
$25,000 tournaments
$10,000 tournaments

Result	No.	Date	Location	Surface	Opponent	Score
Loss	1.	3 March 2004	Mumbai, India	Hard	(United Kingdom) Melanie South	4–6, 4–6
Loss	2.	20 February 2006	Shenzhen, China	Hard	(China) Zhang Shuai	4–6, 2–6
Win	3.	20 June 2006	Changwon, South Korea	Hard	(China) Zhang Shuai	6–3, 6–3
Win	4.	1 August 2006	Changsha, China	Hard	(United Kingdom) Katie O'Brien	6–1, 6–1
Win	5.	23 June 2008	Qianshan, China	Hard	(China) Liang Chen	4–6, 6–4, 6–4

=== Doubles (4–4) ===
Result	No.	Date	Location	Surface	Partner	Opponents	Score
Loss	1.	28 September 2003	Murcia, Spain	Clay	(China) Gao Quan	(France) Delphine de Winne (France) Emilie Trouche	6–7^{(8)}, 2–6
Win	2.	20 February 2006	Shenzhen, China	Hard	(China) Ji Chunmei	(China) Hao Jie (China) Liang Chen	6–3, 6–0
Loss	3.	20 June 2006	Changwon, Korea	Hard	(China) Liu Wanting	(South Korea) Chang Kyung-mi (South Korea) Kim Mi-ok	5–7, 1–6
Win	4.	1 August 2006	Changsha, China	Hard	(China) Liu Wanting	(China) Xia Huan (China) Xu Yifan	6–3, 6–3
Win	5.	28 August 2006	Guangzhou, China	Hard	(China) Ren Jing	(Japan) Ayami Takase (Thailand) Montinee Tangphong	2–6, 6–4, 7–5
Loss	6.	6 May 2007	Chengdu, China	Hard	(China) Liu Wanting	(Japan) Natsumi Hamamura (China) Song Shanshan	5–7, 6–4, 2–6
Loss	7.	11 June 2007	Guangzhou, China	Hard	(China) Zhou Yimiao	(China) Huang Lei (China) Xu Yifan	2–6, 6–7^{(4)}
Win	8.	11 August 2008	Chiang Mai, Thailand	Hard	(Chinese Taipei) Chen Yi	(Thailand) Sophia Mulsap (Thailand) Varatchaya Wongteanchai	7–5, 6–3

== See also ==
- Chinese tennis players
- Tennis in China
