= Li Ting (tennis, born 1980) =

Chinese tennis player

Li Ting 李婷
- Country (sports): China
- Residence: Hubei
- Born: 5 January 1980 (age 46) Wuhan, Hubei
- Height: 1.80 m (5 ft 11 in)
- Turned pro: 1996
- Retired: 2007
- Plays: Right-handed (two-handed backhand)
- Prize money: $383,259

Singles
- Career record: 139–103
- Career titles: 3 ITF
- Highest ranking: No. 136 (28 February 2005)

Grand Slam singles results
- Australian Open: 1R (2005, 2006)
- French Open: Q2 (2006)
- Wimbledon: Q1 (2004, 2006)
- US Open: Q1 (2005, 2006)

Doubles
- Career record: 274–109
- Career titles: 9 WTA, 26 ITF
- Highest ranking: No. 19 (4 October 2004)

Grand Slam doubles results
- Australian Open: 3R (2004, 2005, 2006)
- French Open: QF (2005)
- Wimbledon: 1R (2004, 2006)
- US Open: 3R (2005)
Medal record
Olympic Games
Gold medal – first place	2004 Athens	Doubles

Li Ting (Chinese: 李婷; pinyin: Lǐ Tíng; born 5 January 1980) is a Chinese tennis player. She won a gold medal at the 2004 Summer Olympics in women's doubles alongside Sun Tiantian.

== Education ==
She graduated from the Huazhong University of Science and Technology in 2002.

== Career ==
As a doubles player, Li has enjoyed great success, winning 26 ITF titles and a further nine WTA Tour titles.

She competed at the 2004 Summer Olympics, defeating Spain to win a gold medal in the women's tennis doubles along with her partner Sun Tiantian.

As a singles player, Li enjoyed limited success in ITF events until June 2000, when she qualified for a WTA tournament at Tashkent, then defeated Alina Jidkova of Russia in the first round of the main draw, before bowing out in Round Two. As a wildcard entrant to the WTA event at Shanghai that September, she lost in three sets to Tara Snyder in the first round. Without further success for the rest of the year, she ended world-ranked 325, beating her previous personal best of 347 at the end of 1998.

A year of indifferent results at lowly ITF level followed in 2001, but in September she came through qualifying with three straight wins to reach Shanghai again, beating countrywoman Liu Nannan in the final round, only to lose to Frenchwoman Nathalie Dechy in the main draw. But this achievement was not enough to prevent her world ranking from dropping to 536 by the year's end.

2002 was a poorer year still for Li Ting in singles, as she failed to qualify for Shanghai and won only one match in just four ITF tournaments entered, leading her year-end ranking to slump to 837.

In 2003, she attempted to buck this trend by entering qualifying for several WTA Tour events while shunning the ITF circuit altogether, and managed to win her first round qualifying ties at Hyderabad, Bali and Shanghai, but failed to progress further until the Japan Open in late September, for which she qualified with wins over Ivana Abramović and Yan Zi, before being easily beaten by Shinobu Asagoe of Japan in the main draw first round. Frustrated with her lack of progress at WTA level, she retreated into ITF territory, and met with some success at the $50,000 Paducah tournament in October, where she gained main draw entry as a lucky loser in qualifying, then reached the quarter-final before losing to Zheng Jie in three sets. Following this result, she was awarded wild-cards into two further $50,000 tournaments, but won just one match at the second. Still, she had pulled her world ranking back up inside the top 500, to No. 436.

In 2004, as if from nowhere, Li Ting's WTA career took off. She qualified for Doha with wins over Shikha Uberoi and future stars Mara Santangelo and Maret Ani, then defeated Els Callens in the main draw first round before losing in straight sets to Jennifer Capriati despite forcing a tie-break in the first set. In May, she proved this superb performance was no accident by qualifying for her second successive WTA tournament, this time defeating Martina Müller, Mervana Jugić-Salkić and Michaela Paštiková, all very capable top-150 players, in straight sets, then stunned Iveta Benešová 6–4, 6–1 in the main draw first round before being downed in three sets by Jelena Kostanić in Round 2. She competed little over the summer, but entered qualifying for Beijing in September, beating Martina Suchá in the first round before losing to her on-form countrywoman Li Na. At Guangzhou, she was awarded a wildcard to the main draw, and proved she deserved it by advancing to the semi-final with easy straight-sets victories over Anikó Kapros, Nicole Pratt and Peng Shuai, only to lose again to her former long-time doubles partner (and the eventual tournament champion) Li Na. In October, she entered the first $50k Shenzhen tournament, and reached the quarter-finals after a first-round win over Yan Zi, before losing two matches later to Sun Tiantian. Li Ting ended the year in the top 400 for the first time since 2000, and in the top 300 for the first time in her career, world-ranked 168, after a vastly improved season.

January 2005 saw Li Ting qualify for her first Grand Slam tournament at the Australian Open, with notable wins over Laura Pous Tió and Sandra Kloesel; and she took a set from Marta Domachowska of Poland in the main draw first round but lost the match. In February, she won another three back-to-back matches to qualify for Hyderabad, but then lost to upcoming starlet Jarmila Gajdošová in the first round of the tournament proper. At Doha, she reached the final round of qualifying with wins over Zheng Jie and Anca Barna, then lost to Roberta Vinci. At Dubai, she took Maria Kirilenko to three sets, two of them tie-breaks, in an unfortunate first-round qualifying draw which she ultimately lost. But by the end of February she had improved her world-ranking to a career-best 136.

Li Ting's results at WTA events then took a downward turn for the next six months. Although she battled through to win a $50k event at Beijing in June, defeating Yan Zi surprisingly comfortably in the final, this career-best tournament victory was a blip on the radar of her disappointing summer results at WTA tournaments. In September, however, she came close to qualifying for Beijing, beating Martina Müller before losing to Emma Laine in three sets. Then at Guangzhou, she reached the quarterfinal with excellent wins over Vera Zvonareva and Alina Jidkova, then very nearly reached the semifinal for the second successive year, as she pushed eventual finalist Nuria Llagostera Vives all the way before finally losing their joust 6–3, 4–6, 6–7. But after this, she did not play again for the rest of the year, and ended it ranked 177th, down almost forty places on her peak.

The 2006 season began promisingly for Li Ting, as she qualified for the Australian Open for the second consecutive year, but lost in the first round to Elena Vesnina. In February, she performed well in qualifying for the tournament in Doha, Qatar, recording wins over Yan Zi and Tatiana Poutchek. However, she was defeated in the first round of the main draw by Maria Kirilenko in straight sets. By the end of the month, her ranking had fallen to 209. Despite this, she demonstrated the ability to compete against higher-ranked players.

In 2007, Li stopped partnering with Sun Tiantian, to make room for a new Chinese doubles player. Sun Shengnan was paired with Sun Tiantian, according to the 2007 Australian Open website.

== Olympic finals ==
=== Doubles: 1 (gold medal) ===
Result	Year	Championship	Surface	Partner	Opponents	Score
Gold	2004	Athens	Hard	(China) Sun Tiantian	(Spain) Conchita Martínez (Spain) Virginia Ruano	6–3, 6–3

== WTA career finals ==
=== Doubles: 13 (9 titles, 4 runner-ups) ===
Legend
Grand Slam (0/0)
Tier I (0/0)
Tier II (0/1)
Tier III (4/0)
Tier IV (5/3)

Result	No.	Date	Tournament	Surface	Partner	Opponents	Score
Win	1.	Jun 2000	Tashkent Open, Uzbekistan	Hard	(China) Li Na	(Uzbekistan) Iroda Tulyaganova (Ukraine) Anna Zaporozhanova	3–6, 6–2, 6–4
Win	2.	Jun 2003	Austrian Open, Austria	Clay	(China) Sun Tiantian	(China) Yan Zi (China) Zheng Jie	6–3, 6–4
Loss	1.	Oct 2003	Tashkent Open, Uzbekistan	Hard	(China) Sun Tiantian	(Ukraine) Yuliya Beygelzimer (Belarus) Tatiana Poutchek	3–6, 6–7^{(0)}
Win	3.	Nov 2003	Bell Challenge, Canada	Hard(i)	(China) Sun Tiantian	(Belgium) Els Callens (United States) Meilen Tu	6–3, 6–3
Win	4.	Nov 2003	Pattaya Open, Thailand	Hard	(China) Sun Tiantian	(Indonesia) Wynne Prakusya (Indonesia) Angelique Widjaja	6–4, 6–3
Loss	2.	Feb 2004	Bangalore Open, India	Hard	(China) Sun Tiantian	(South Africa) Liezel Huber (India) Sania Mirza	6–7^{(1)}, 4–6
Win	5.	Oct 2004	Guangzhou Open, China	Hard	(China) Sun Tiantian	(China) Yang Shujing (China) Yu Ying	6–4, 6–1
Loss	3.	Feb 2005	Bangalore Open, India	Hard	(China) Sun Tiantian	(China) Yan Zi (China) Zheng Jie	4–6, 1–6
Win	6.	May 2005	Estoril Open, Portugal	Clay	(China) Sun Tiantian	(Netherlands) Michaëlla Krajicek (Slovakia) Henrieta Nagyová	6–3, 6–1
Win	7.	Feb 2006	Pattaya Open, Thailand	Hard	(China) Sun Tiantian	(China) Yan Zi (China) Zheng Jie	3–6, 6–1, 7–6^{(5)}
Loss	4.	Mar 2006	Doha Open, Qatar	Hard	(China) Sun Tiantian	(Slovakia) Daniela Hantuchová (Japan) Ai Sugiyama	4–6, 4–6
Win	8.	May 2006	Estoril Open, Portugal	Clay	(China) Sun Tiantian	(Argentina) Gisela Dulko (Spain) María Sánchez Lorenzo	6–2, 6–2
Win	9.	Oct 2006	Guangzhou Open, China	Hard	(China) Sun Tiantian	(United States) Vania King (Croatia) Jelena Kostanić Tošić	6–4, 2–6, 7–5

== ITF Circuit finals ==
$50,000 tournaments
$25,000 tournaments
$10,000 tournaments

=== Singles: 3 (3–0) ===
Result	No.	Date	Tournament	Surface	Opponent	Score
Win	1.	19 September 1999	ITF Ibaraki, Japan	Hard	(United Kingdom) Kate Warne-Holland	6–4, 2–6, 6-1
Win	2.	26 September 1999	ITF Tokyo, Japan	Hard	(Thailand) Orawan Wongkamalasai	6–0, 3–6, 6-0
Win	3.	12 June 2005	ITF Beijing, China	Hard	(China) Yan Zi	6–1, 6-3

=== Doubles: 37 (26–11) ===
Result	No.	Date	Tournament	Surface	Partner	Opponents	Score
Win	1.	10 November 1997	ITF Manila, Philippines	Hard	(China) Ding Ding	(Malaysia) Khoo Chin-bee (Chinese Taipei) Weng Tzu-ting	7–5, 6–3
Win	2.	2 March 1998	ITF New Delhi, India	Hard	(China) Ding Ding	(Japan) Motoe Uchida (China) Qin Yang	6–3, 6–2
Loss	3.	10 May 1998	ITF Seoul, South Korea	Clay	(China) Ding Ding	(South Korea) Cho Yoon-jeong (South Korea) Park Sung-hee	1–6, 6–3, 2–6
Loss	4.	7 June 1998	ITF Little Rock, United States	Hard	(China) Li Li	(Japan) Keiko Ishida (Japan) Keiko Nagatomi	5–7, 1–6
Win	5.	13 June 1999	ITF Shenzhen, China	Hard	(China) Li Na	(Indonesia) Liza Andriyani (Indonesia) Irawati Iskandar	6–1, 6–3
Win	6.	21 June 1999	ITF Shenzhen, China	Hard	(China) Li Na	(South Korea) Chung Yang-jin (South Korea) Lee Eun-jeong	6–3, 6–1
Win	7.	15 August 1999	ITF Rebecq, Belgium	Clay	(China) Li Na	(Netherlands) Natasha Galouza (Netherlands) Maaike Koutstaal	6–1, 6–4
Win	8.	22 August 1999	ITF Koksijde, Belgium	Clay	(China) Li Na	(New Zealand) Rewa Hudson (New Zealand) Shelley Stephens	6–3, 6–2
Win	9.	29 August 1999	ITF Westende, Belgium	Clay	(China) Li Na	(Netherlands) Natasha Galouza (Netherlands) Anouk Sterk	7–6^{(5)}, 6–2
Win	10.	19 September 1999	ITF Ibaraki, Japan	Clay	(China) Li Na	(South Africa) Mareze Joubert (United Kingdom) Kate Warne-Holland	7–6^{(4)}, 6–3
Win	11.	26 September 1999	ITF Tokyo, Japan	Clay	(China) Li Na	(Japan) Maki Arai (Japan) Kumiko Iijima	6–2, 6–1
Win	12.	12 December 1999	ITF Manila, Philippines	Hard	(China) Li Na	(Japan) Haruka Inoue (Japan) Maiko Inoue	6–3, 6–2
Win	13.	10 January 2000	ITF Boca Raton, United States	Hard	(Japan) Maiko Inoue	(Czech Republic) Olga Blahotová (Czech Republic) Gabriela Chmelinová	4–6, 6–2, 6–3
Loss	14.	17 January 2000	ITF Boca Raton, United States	Hard	(China) Li Na	(United States) Sandra Cacic (United States) Lindsay Lee-Waters	4–6, 5–7
Win	15.	30 January 2000	ITF Hallandale, United States	Hard	(China) Li Na	(United States) Jean Okada (Czech Republic) Hana Šromová	6–3, 7–5
Win	16.	28 February 2000	ITF Chengdu, China	Hard	(China) Li Na	(Brazil) Joana Cortez (Hungary) Katalin Marosi	6–1, 6–3
Win	17.	26 March 2000	ITF Nanjing, China	Hard	(China) Li Na	(South Korea) Chae Kyung-yee (Japan) Ryoko Takemura	7–6^{(4)}, 6–1
Win	18.	2 April 2000	ITF Nanjing, China	Hard	(China) Li Na	(China) Ding Ding (China) Lin Ya-ming	6–1, 7–6
Win	19.	23 April 2000	ITF Dalian, China	Hard	(China) Li Na	(South Korea) Chang Kyung-mi (Japan) Satoko Kurioka	7–5, 6–3
Loss	20.	14 May 2000	ITF Seoul, South Korea	Clay	(China) Li Na	(Japan) Shinobu Asagoe (Japan) Saori Obata	1–6, 3–6
Loss	21.	28 May 2000	ITF Ho Chi Minh City, Vietnam	Hard	(China) Li Na	(South Korea) Cho Yoon-jeong (Japan) Saori Obata	1–6, 2–6
Loss	22.	4 June 2000	ITF Shenzhen, China	Hard	(China) Li Na	(South Korea) Kim Eun-ha (Japan) Saori Obata	1–6, 3–6
Win	23.	2 July 2000	ITF Orbetello, Italy	Clay	(China) Li Na	(Brazil) Joana Cortez (Brazil) Miriam D'Agostini	6–3, 7–6^{(3)}
Loss	23.	4 June 2001	ITF Shenzhen, China	Hard	(China) Lui-Li Shen	(China) Liu Nannan (China) Peng Shuai	4–6, 1-6
Win	24.	29 July 2001	ITF Guangzhou, China	Hard	(Hong Kong) Tong Ka-po	(China) Chen Yan (China) Sun Tiantian	7–5, 6–3
Loss	25.	21 April 2002	ITF Cagliari, Italy	Clay	(China) Li Na	(China) Yan Zi (China) Zheng Jie	4–6, 0–6
Win	26.	11 August 2002	ITF Beijing, China	Hard	(China) Sun Tiantian	(China) Yan Zi (China) Zheng Jie	7–5, 6-3
Win	27.	23 February 2003	ITF Columbus, United States	Hard (i)	(China) Sun Tiantian	(Brazil) Bruna Colósio (Brazil) Joana Cortez	6–3, 6–1
Win	28.	2 March 2003	ITF Saint Paul, United States	Hard	(China) Sun Tiantian	(United States) Teryn Ashley (United States) Abigail Spears	6–3, 6-1
Win	29.	30 March 2003	ITF Atlanta, United States	Hard	(China) Sun Tiantian	(New Zealand) Leanne Baker (Italy) Francesca Lubiani	4–6, 6–4, 6-4
Loss	30.	16 June 2003	ITF Gorizia, Italy	Clay	(China) Sun Tiantian	(China) Yan Zi (China) Zheng Jie	6-7^{(5)}, 6–1, 4-6
Win	31.	23 June 2003	ITF Fontanafredda, Italy	Clay	(China) Sun Tiantian	(Bulgaria) Maria Geznenge (Serbia and Montenegro) Dragana Zarić	6–4, 6–3
Loss	32.	30 June 2003	ITF Orbetello, Italy	Clay	(China) Sun Tiantian	(China) Yan Zi (China) Zheng Jie	2–6, 5-7
Win	33.	13 July 2003	ITF Modena, Italy	Clay	(China) Sun Tiantian	(Japan) Rika Fujiwara (Australia) Trudi Musgrave	3–6, 7–5, 7–5
Win	34.	30 November 2003	ITF Changsha, China	Hard	(China) Sun Tiantian	(China) Yan Zi (China) Zheng Jie	6–4, 6-2
Win	35.	7 December 2003	ITF Shenzhen, China	Hard	(China) Sun Tiantian	(China) Yan Zi (China) Zheng Jie	6–3, 3–6, 6-4
Loss	36.	6 June 2005	ITF Beijing, China	Hard	(China) Sun Tiantian	(China) Yan Zi (China) Zheng Jie	1–6, 5-7
Win	37.	16 August 2005	Bronx Open, United States	Hard	(China) Sun Tiantian	(Belarus) Tatiana Poutchek (Belarus) Anastasiya Yakimova	2–6, 6–2, 6–4

== See also ==
- Tennis in China
