= 2012 Guangzhou International Women's Open – Singles =

Singles
- 2012 Guangzhou International Women's Open

Final
- Champion: (Chinese Taipei) Hsieh Su-wei
- Runner-up: (United Kingdom) Laura Robson
- Score: 6–3, 5–7, 6–4

Details
- Draw: 32
- Seeds: 8

Events
Singles	Doubles
- Guangzhou International Women's Open

Chanelle Scheepers was the defending champion, but lost to Urszula Radwańska in the quarterfinals.

Hsieh Su-wei won the title, defeating Laura Robson in the final 6–3, 5–7, 6–4. Robson became the first British player to reach the WTA Tour level final since Jo Durie in the 1990 Virginia Slims of Newport.

== Seeds ==
1. (France) Marion Bartoli (first round, retired because of illness)
2. (China) Zheng Jie (second round)
3. (Romania) Sorana Cîrstea (semifinals)
4. (Poland) Urszula Radwańska (semifinals)
5. (South Africa) Chanelle Scheepers (quarterfinals)
6. (Romania) Monica Niculescu (first round)
7. (China) Peng Shuai (quarterfinals)
8. (France) Alizé Cornet (quarterfinals)

== Draw ==
Key

- Q = Qualifier
- WC = Wild card
- LL = Lucky loser
- Alt = Alternate
- ITF = ITF entry
- PR = Protected ranking
- SR = Special ranking
- SE = Special exempt
- JE = Junior exempt
- JR = Junior Accelerator Programme entrant
- CO = College Accelerator Programme entrant
- NG = Next Gen Accelerator Program entrant
- w/o = Walkover
- r = Retired
- d = Defaulted

=== Finals ===
Semifinals
(Chinese Taipei) Hsieh Su-wei	6	3	6
4	(Poland) Urszula Radwańska	1	6	0
3	(Romania) Sorana Cîrstea	4	2
(United Kingdom) Laura Robson	6	6

Final
(Chinese Taipei) Hsieh Su-wei	6	5	6
(United Kingdom) Laura Robson	3	7	4

=== Top half ===
First round
1	(France) M Bartoli	3^{r}
LL	(Chinese Taipei) K-c Chang	4
(Russia) N Bratchikova	5	3
(Chinese Taipei) S-w Hsieh	7	6
(United States) J Cohen	6^{1}	5
WC	(China) S Zheng	7^{7}	7
(France) M Johansson	7	6
6	(Romania) M Niculescu	5	2
4	(Poland) U Radwańska	7^{7}	6
(Hungary) M Czink	6^{1}	2
(France) P Parmentier	5	6	3
(Luxembourg) M Minella	7	3	6
(Hungary) T Babos	1	3
(Serbia) B Jovanovski	6	6
WC	(China) Q Wang	0	3
5	(South Africa) C Scheepers	6	6

Second round
LL	(Chinese Taipei) K-c Chang	0	3
(Chinese Taipei) S-w Hsieh	6	6
WC	(China) S Zheng	2	6	5
(France) M Johansson	6	4	7
4	(Poland) U Radwańska	6	6
(Luxembourg) M Minella	2	3
(Serbia) B Jovanovski	4	1
5	(South Africa) C Scheepers	6	6

Quarterfinals
(Chinese Taipei) S-w Hsieh	6	6
(France) M Johansson	3	0
4	(Poland) U Radwańska	6	7
5	(South Africa) C Scheepers	1	5

Semifinals
(Chinese Taipei) S-w Hsieh	6	3	6
4	(Poland) U Radwańska	1	6	0

=== Bottom half ===
First round
8	(France) A Cornet	6	1
(Russia) A Panova	3	1^{r}
(Belarus) O Govortsova	7	6
Q	(Kazakhstan) Z Diyas	5	2
Q	(Thailand) L Kumkhum	2	1
WC	(China) Y Duan	6	6
Q	(China) Y Hu	2	5
3	(Romania) S Cîrstea	6	7
7	(China) S Peng	7^{7}	6
(Japan) A Morita	6^{3}	0
Q	(Thailand) N Luangnam	6^{5}	6	6
(Australia) J Gajdošová	7^{7}	4	2
(Spain) M-T Torró-Flor	2	1^{r}
(United Kingdom) L Robson	6	3
(Chinese Taipei) Y-j Chan	3^{r}
2	(China) J Zheng	5

Second round
8	(France) A Cornet	6
(Belarus) O Govortsova	4	r
WC	(China) Y Duan	1	6^{0}
3	(Romania) S Cîrstea	6	7^{7}
7	(China) S Peng	6	6
Q	(Thailand) N Luangnam	2	1
(United Kingdom) L Robson	6	6
2	(China) J Zheng	3	3

Quarterfinals
8	(France) A Cornet	4	3
3	(Romania) S Cîrstea	6	6
7	(China) S Peng	5	7	2
(United Kingdom) L Robson	7	5	6

Semifinals
3	(Romania) S Cîrstea	4	2
(United Kingdom) L Robson	6	6

== Qualifying ==
=== Seeds ===
1. (Australia) Casey Dellacqua (second round)
2. (Spain) Lara Arruabarrena Vecino (second round)
3. (Slovakia) Jana Čepelová (first round)
4. (Chinese Taipei) Chang Kai-chen (qualifying competition, lucky loser)
5. (Russia) Valeria Savinykh (qualifying competition)
6. (Japan) Erika Sema (second round)
7. (Italy) Alberta Brianti (first round, retired)
8. (Thailand) Tamarine Tanasugarn (second round, retired)

=== Qualifiers ===
1. (Kazakhstan) Zarina Diyas
2. (China) Hu Yueyue
3. (Thailand) Nudnida Luangnam
4. (Thailand) Luksika Kumkhum

=== Lucky losers ===
1. (Chinese Taipei) Chang Kai-chen

=== Draw ===
==== First qualifier ====
First round
1	(Australia) Casey Dellacqua	6	6
WC	(China) Yan Zhen	1	1
(Russia) Alla Kudryavtseva	3	5
(Kazakhstan) Zarina Diyas	6	7
(United States) Tetiana Luzhanska	6	6
WC	(China) Lu Xiaojing	0	0
(Japan) Yurika Sema	2	0
5	(Russia) Valeria Savinykh	6	6

Second round
1	(Australia) Casey Dellacqua	3	4
(Kazakhstan) Zarina Diyas	6	6
(United States) Tetiana Luzhanska	2	4
5	(Russia) Valeria Savinykh	6	6

Qualifying competition
(Kazakhstan) Zarina Diyas	6	6
5	(Russia) Valeria Savinykh	3	4

==== Second qualifier ====
First round
2	(Spain) Lara Arruabarrena Vecino	6	3	6
WC	(China) Tang Haochen	3	6	2
(China) Zhao Yijing	6	6
(Ukraine) Olga Savchuk	2	3
Alt	(China) Liu Chang	3	3
(China) Hu Yueyue	6	6
(France) Irena Pavlovic	6	1	0^{r}
6	(Japan) Erika Sema	3	6	0

Second round
2	(Spain) Lara Arruabarrena Vecino	3	2
(China) Zhao Yijing	6	6
(China) Hu Yueyue	6	6
6	(Japan) Erika Sema	4	3

Qualifying competition
(China) Zhao Yijing	0	6	2
(China) Hu Yueyue	6	3	6

==== Third qualifier ====
First round
3	(Slovakia) Jana Čepelová	3	4
(Hong Kong) Zhang Ling	6	6
(Thailand) Nudnida Luangnam	6	6
(Chinese Taipei) Chan Chin-wei	2	2
(China) Sun Shengnan	6	6
(China) Han Xinyun	2	1
(Thailand) Varatchaya Wongteanchai	7^{7}	5
7	(Italy) Alberta Brianti	6^{4}	1^{r}

Second round
(Hong Kong) Zhang Ling	6	3	2
(Thailand) Nudnida Luangnam	3	6	6
(China) Sun Shengnan	3	4
(Thailand) Varatchaya Wongteanchai	6	6

Qualifying competition
(Thailand) Nudnida Luangnam	6	6
(Thailand) Varatchaya Wongteanchai	1	4

==== Fourth qualifier ====
First round
4	(Chinese Taipei) Chang Kai-chen	6	6
(Japan) Shuko Aoyama	1	2
(China) Xu Yifan	5	0
(Japan) Kurumi Nara	7	6
(Thailand) Luksika Kumkhum	6	6
(Romania) Mădălina Gojnea	0	2
WC	(China) Yang Zi	0	5
8	(Thailand) Tamarine Tanasugarn	6	7

Second round
4	(Chinese Taipei) Chang Kai-chen	6	6
(Japan) Kurumi Nara	3	2
(Thailand) Luksika Kumkhum	4
8	(Thailand) Tamarine Tanasugarn	1^{r}

Qualifying competition
4	(Chinese Taipei) Chang Kai-chen	2	6	0
(Thailand) Luksika Kumkhum	6	4	6
