= 2011 Guangzhou International Women's Open – Doubles =

Doubles
- 2011 Guangzhou International Women's Open

Final
- Champion: (Chinese Taipei) Hsieh Su-wei (China) Zheng Saisai
- Runner-up: (Chinese Taipei) Chan Chin-wei (China) Han Xinyun
- Score: 6–2, 6–1

Events
Singles	Doubles
← 2010 ·	Guangzhou International Women's Open	· 2012 →

Edina Gallovits-Hall and Sania Mirza were the defending champions, but decided not to participate.

Hsieh Su-wei and Zheng Saisai won the title. They defeated Chan Chin-wei and Han Xinyun 6–2, 6–1 in the final.

== Seeds ==
1. (Australia) Jarmila Gajdošová / (Australia) Anastasia Rodionova (quarterfinals)
2. (Italy) Alberta Brianti / (Croatia) Petra Martić (semifinals)
3. (Chinese Taipei) Chang Kai-chen / (United States) Jill Craybas (quarterfinals)
4. (Russia) Maria Kondratieva / (China) Sun Shengnan (first round)

== Draw ==
=== Key ===
- Q = Qualifier
- WC = Wild card
- LL = Lucky loser
- Alt = Alternate
- SE = Special exempt
- PR = Protected ranking
- ITF = ITF entry
- JE = Junior exempt
- w/o = Walkover
- r = Retired
- d = Defaulted
- SR = Special ranking

First round
1	(Australia) J Gajdošová (Australia) A Rodionova	6	6
WC	(China) Y Pang (China) Z Yang	0	0
(Chinese Taipei) H-c Chan (Chinese Taipei) Y-j Chan	7	6
(Chinese Taipei) Y Chen (Thailand) N Lertcheewakarn	5	3
3	(Chinese Taipei) K-c Chang (United States) J Craybas	w/o
(Russia) K Pervak (Slovakia) M Rybáriková
(Ukraine) T Luzhanska (China) Y Xu	0	3
(Chinese Taipei) C-w Chan (China) X Han	6	6
(France) S Lefèvre (China) W Liu	3	6^{4}
(Indonesia) Y Basuki (China) J Lu	6	7^{7}
(Chinese Taipei) S-w Hsieh (China) S Zheng	6	6
4	(Russia) M Kondratieva (China) S Sun	1	3
WC	(China) C Liang (China) R Tian	4	6	[12]
(Ukraine) A Bondarenko (Ukraine) M Koryttseva	6	3	[10]
(France) I Brémond (Chinese Taipei) W-h Hsu	5	5
2	(Italy) A Brianti (Croatia) P Martić	7	7

Quarterfinals
1	(Australia) J Gajdošová (Australia) A Rodionova	3	6^{1}
(Chinese Taipei) H-c Chan (Chinese Taipei) Y-j Chan	6	7^{7}
3	(Chinese Taipei) K-c Chang (United States) J Craybas	5	4
(Chinese Taipei) C-w Chan (China) X Han	7	6
(Indonesia) Y Basuki (China) J Lu	1	1
(Chinese Taipei) S-w Hsieh (China) S Zheng	6	6
WC	(China) C Liang (China) R Tian	7	2	[8]
2	(Italy) A Brianti (Croatia) P Martić	5	6	[10]

Semifinals
(Chinese Taipei) H-c Chan (Chinese Taipei) Y-j Chan	5	2
(Chinese Taipei) C-w Chan (China) X Han	7	6
(Chinese Taipei) S-w Hsieh (China) S Zheng	6	6
2	(Italy) A Brianti (Croatia) P Martić	3	2

Finals
(Chinese Taipei) C-w Chan (China) X Han	2	1
(Chinese Taipei) S-w Hsieh (China) S Zheng	6	6
