= 2011 Guangzhou International Women's Open – Singles qualifying =

This article displays the qualifying draw of the 2011 Guangzhou International Women's Open.

== Players ==
=== Seeds ===
1. (Thailand) Noppawan Lertcheewakarn (moved to Main Draw)
2. (Romania) Mădălina Gojnea (qualifying competition)
3. (Kazakhstan) Zarina Diyas (qualified)
4. (Hong Kong) Zhang Ling (qualifying competition)
5. (Russia) Alla Kudryavtseva (withdrew)
6. (Chinese Taipei) Hsieh Su-wei (qualified)
7. (China) Wang Qiang (second round)
8. (Chinese Taipei) Hsu Wen-hsin (first round)
9. (Thailand) Nicha Lertpitaksinchai (qualifying competition)
10. (Chinese Taipei) Chan Chin-wei (qualifying competition)

=== Qualifiers ===
1. (China) Xu Yifan
2. (China) Zhao Yijing
3. (Kazakhstan) Zarina Diyas
4. (Chinese Taipei) Hsieh Su-wei

== Qualifying draw ==
=== First qualifier ===
First round
WC	(China) Pang Yang	6	6
WC	(China) Huang Chuxian	2	3
(China) Yang Zi	4	5
(China) Xu Yifan	6	7
(China) Liu Wanting	4	0
7	(China) Wang Qiang	6	6

Second round
10	(Chinese Taipei) Chan Chin-wei	6	6
WC	(China) Pang Yang	1	1
(China) Xu Yifan	7^{7}	6
7	(China) Wang Qiang	6^{4}	3

Qualifying competition
10	(Chinese Taipei) Chan Chin-wei	1	2
(China) Xu Yifan	6	6

=== Second qualifier ===
First round
WC	(China) Zhao Yijing	4	6	7^{7}
8	(Chinese Taipei) Hsu Wen-hsin	6	1	6^{5}

Second round
2	(Romania) Mădălina Gojnea	6	6
WC	(China) Tian Ran	1	3
WC	(Chinese Taipei) Chen Yi	3	3
WC	(China) Zhao Yijing	6	6

Qualifying competition
2	(Romania) Mădălina Gojnea	2	3
WC	(China) Zhao Yijing	6	6

=== Third qualifier ===
First round					Second round					Qualifying competition
					3	(Kazakhstan) Zarina Diyas	3	6	6
	(Denmark) Karen Barbat	1	6	7		(Denmark) Karen Barbat	6	2	1
	(Japan) Chihiro Takayama	6	3	5						3	(Kazakhstan) Zarina Diyas	7	6
	(China) Duan Yingying	6	6							9	(Thailand) Nicha Lertpitaksinchai	5	1
WC	(China) Zhao Di	2	1			(China) Duan Yingying	3	0
					9	(Thailand) Nicha Lertpitaksinchai	6	6

=== Fourth qualifier ===
First round					Second round				Qualifying competition
					4	(Hong Kong) Zhang Ling	6	6
	(China) Hu Yueyue	7	4	6^{3}	WC	(China) Yan Zhen	2	2
WC	(China) Yan Zhen	5	6	7^{7}					4	(Hong Kong) Zhang Ling	6^{0}	6	1
WC	(China) Liang Chen	6	6						6	(Chinese Taipei) Hsieh Su-wei	7^{7}	4	6
WC	(China) Xu Baoyi	0	2		WC	(China) Liang Chen	1	4
					6	(Chinese Taipei) Hsieh Su-wei	6	6
