= 2012 Guangzhou International Women's Open =

- Date: September 17–23
- Edition: 9th
- Category: WTA International
- Surface: Hard / outdoor
- Location: Guangzhou, China

Champions

Singles
- (Chinese Taipei) Hsieh Su-wei

Doubles
- (Thailand) Tamarine Tanasugarn / (China) Zhang Shuai
← 2011 ·	Guangzhou International Women's Open	· 2013 →

The 2012 Guangzhou International Women's Open was a women's tennis tournament played on outdoor hard courts. It was the 9th edition of the Guangzhou International Women's Open, and part of the WTA International tournaments of the 2012 WTA Tour. It took place in Guangzhou, China, from September 17 through September 23, 2012. Unseeded Hsieh Su-wei won the singles title.

== Finals ==
=== Singles ===
- (Chinese Taipei) Hsieh Su-wei defeated (United Kingdom) Laura Robson, 6–3, 5–7, 6–4

It was the second title of the year and the second of her career for Hsieh. It was the first tour level final of her career for Robson.

=== Doubles ===
- (Thailand) Tamarine Tanasugarn / (China) Zhang Shuai defeated (Australia) Jarmila Gajdošová / (Romania) Monica Niculescu, 2–6, 6–2, [10–8]

== Singles main-draw entrants ==
=== Seeds ===
Country	Player	Rank^{1}	Seed
FRA	Marion Bartoli	10	1
CHN	Zheng Jie	23	2
ROU	Sorana Cîrstea	32	3
POL	Urszula Radwańska	40	4
RSA	Chanelle Scheepers	44	5
ROU	Monica Niculescu	47	6
CHN	Peng Shuai	48	7
FRA	Alizé Cornet	49	8

- ^{1} Seeds are based on the rankings of September 10, 2012

=== Other entrants ===
The following players received wildcards into the singles main draw:

- (China) Duan Yingying
- (China) Wang Qiang
- (China) Zheng Saisai

The following players received entry from the qualifying draw:

- (Kazakhstan) Zarina Diyas
- (Thailand) Luksika Kumkhum
- (Thailand) Nudnida Luangnam
- (China) Hu Yueyue

The following player received entry as lucky loser:

- (Chinese Taipei) Kai-Chen Chang

=== Withdrawals ===
- (Czech Republic) Petra Cetkovská

=== Retirements ===
- (France) Marion Bartoli (gastrointestinal illness)
- (Belarus) Olga Govortsova
- (Russia) Alexandra Panova
- (Spain) María-Teresa Torró-Flor
- (Chinese Taipei) Chan Yung-jan (dizziness)

== Doubles main-draw entrants ==
=== Seeds ===
Country	Player	Country	Player	Rank^{1}	Seed
AUS	Jarmila Gajdošová	ROU	Monica Niculescu	74	1
TPE	Chan Hao-ching	TPE	Chan Yung-jan	106	2
THA	Tamarine Tanasugarn	CHN	Zhang Shuai	120	3
RUS	Nina Bratchikova	RUS	Alla Kudryavtseva	143	4

- ^{1} Rankings are as of September 10, 2012

=== Other entrants ===
The following pairs received wildcards into the doubles main draw:

- (China) Liang Chen / (China) Tian Ran
- (China) Yan Zi / (Hong Kong) Zhang Ling

=== Retirements ===
- (Chinese Taipei) Chan Yung-jan (dizziness)
- (France) Pauline Parmentier (gastrointestinal illness)
