= 2010 Hopman Cup =

- Date: 2 January – 9 January 2010
- Edition: XXII
- Surface: Hard (indoor)
- Location: Perth, Western Australia
- Venue: Burswood Entertainment Complex

Champions
- Spain
← 2009 ·	Hopman Cup	· 2011 →

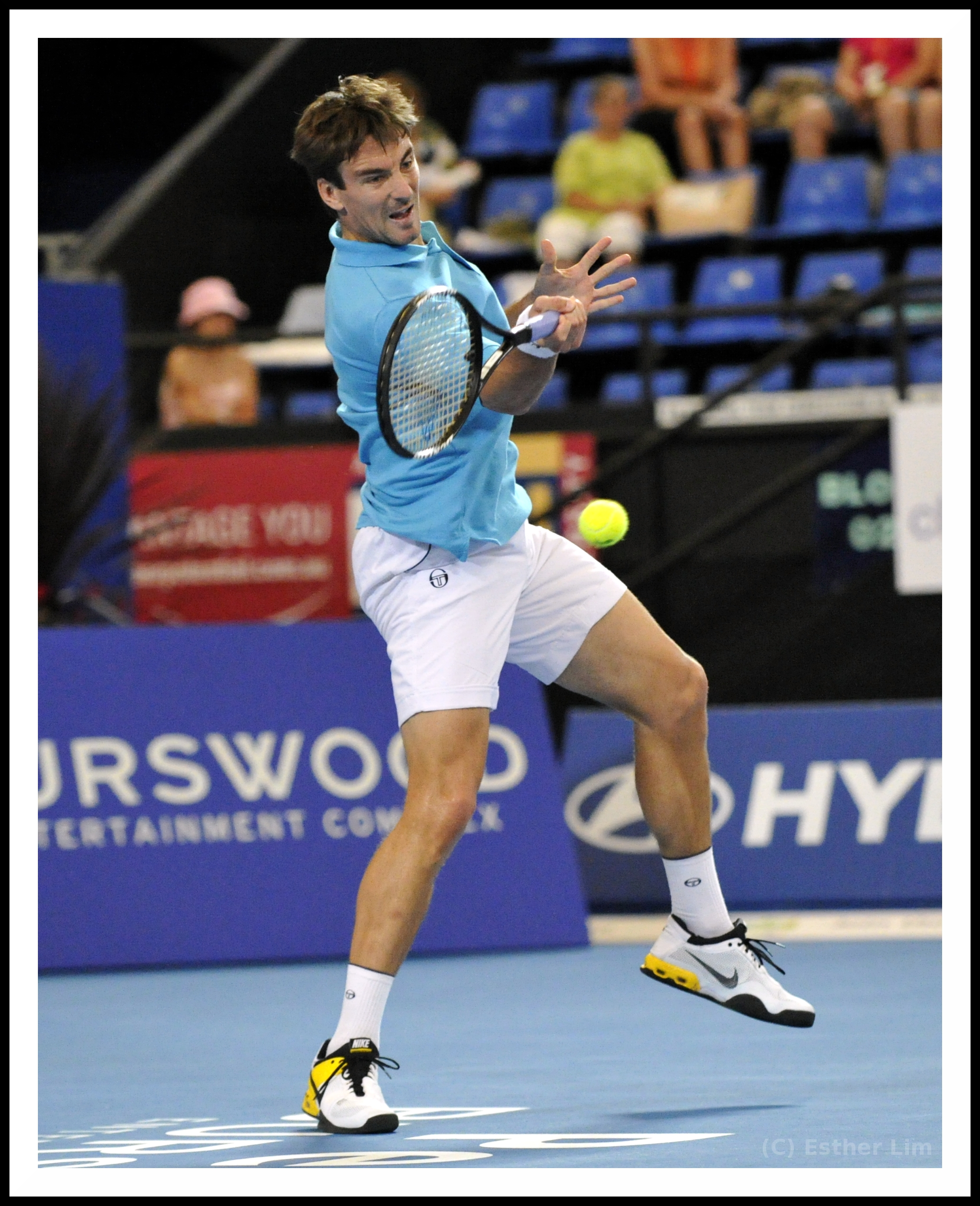
Robredo won the Hopman Cup for a second time in 2010

The Hopman Cup XXII (also known as the Hyundai Hopman Cup for sponsorship reasons) corresponds to the 22nd edition of the Hopman Cup tournament between nations in men's and women's tennis. The tournament started on 2 January 2010 at the Burswood Dome in Perth, Western Australia.

Eight nations competed. They were formed of one man and one woman from the same nation. The nations were split into two pools of four with the group winners contesting the final.

Slovakia were the defending champions but were not invited to participate in 2010, whilst Kazakhstan qualified for the event by winning the Asian Hopman Cup.

Spain won their third title, defeating Great Britain in the final 2–1.

== Seeds ==
1. AUS – Samantha Stosur / Lleyton Hewitt (round robin)
2. RUS – Elena Dementieva / Igor Andreev (round robin)
3. Great Britain – Laura Robson / Andy Murray (finalists)
4. ESP – María José Martínez Sánchez / Tommy Robredo (champions)

== Group A ==
=== Standings ===
Pos.	Country	W	L	Matches	Sets
1	Spain	3	0	9 – 0	18 – 2
2	United States	1	2	4 – 5	9 – 11
3	Australia	1	2	3 – 6	9 – 13
4	Romania	1	2	2 – 7	5 – 15

=== Australia vs. Romania ===
Australia
1
Burswood Entertainment Complex, Perth
2 January 2010, 10:00 AWST (UTC+8)
hard (indoors)

Romania
2

			1	2	3
1	(Australia) (Romania)	Samantha Stosur; Sorana Cîrstea	6; 3	4; 6	3; 6
2	(Australia) (Romania)	Lleyton Hewitt; Victor Hănescu	3; 6	6; 3	7^{7} 6^{2}
3	(Australia) (Romania)	Samantha Stosur / Lleyton Hewitt; Sorana Cîrstea / Victor Hănescu	5; 7	1; 6

=== Spain vs. United States ===
Spain
3
Burswood Entertainment Complex, Perth
3 January 2010, 10:00 AWST (UTC+8)
hard (indoors)

United States
0

			1	2	3
1	(Spain) (United States)	María José Martínez Sánchez; Melanie Oudin	6; 4	6; 4
2	(Spain) (United States)	Tommy Robredo; John Isner	6^{5} 7^{7}	6; 3	7^{7} 6^{4}
3	(Spain) (United States)	María José Martínez Sánchez / Tommy Robredo; Melanie Oudin / John Isner	6; 4	7; 5

=== Australia vs. United States ===
Australia
2
Burswood Entertainment Complex, Perth
5 January 2010, 10.00 AWST (UTC+8)
hard (indoors)

United States
1

			1	2	3
1	(Australia) (United States)	Samantha Stosur; Melanie Oudin	6; 2	6; 4
2	(Australia) (United States)	Lleyton Hewitt; John Isner	6; 1	7; 5
3	(Australia) (United States)	Samantha Stosur / Lleyton Hewitt; Melanie Oudin / John Isner	6; 2	1; 6	[5] [10]

=== Spain vs. Romania ===
Spain
3
Burswood Entertainment Complex, Perth
5 January 2010, 17.30 AWST (UTC+8)
hard (indoors)

Romania
0

			1	2	3
1	(Spain) (Romania)	María José Martínez Sánchez; Sorana Cîrstea	6; 4	6; 3
2	(Spain) (Romania)	Tommy Robredo; Victor Hănescu	6; 3			retired
3	(Spain) (Romania)	María José Martínez Sánchez / Tommy Robredo; Sorana Cîrstea / Victor Hănescu				w/o

- Pat Cash joined Cîrstea to take on the Spanish duo in the doubles over a Pro Set. The Spanish pair won 8–4.

=== Spain vs. Australia ===
Spain
3
Burswood Entertainment Complex, Perth
7 January 2010, 10.00 AWST (UTC+8)
hard (indoors)

Australia
0

			1	2	3
1	(Spain) (Australia)	María José Martínez Sánchez; Samantha Stosur	6; 4	6; 1
2	(Spain) (Australia)	Tommy Robredo; Lleyton Hewitt	6; 2	6; 4
3	(Spain) (Australia)	María José Martínez Sánchez / Tommy Robredo; Samantha Stosur / Lleyton Hewitt	6; 3	3; 6	[10] [7]

=== Romania vs. United States ===
Romania
0
Burswood Entertainment Complex, Perth
7 January 2010, 10.00 AWST (UTC+8)
hard (indoors)

United States
3

			1	2	3
1	(Romania) (United States)	Sorana Cîrstea; Melanie Oudin	2; 6	3; 6
2	(Romania) (United States)	Victor Hănescu; John Isner				w/o
3	(Romania) (United States)	Sorana Cîrstea / Victor Hănescu; Melanie Oudin / John Isner				w/o

== Group B ==
=== Standings ===
Pos.	Country	W	L	Matches	Sets
1	Great Britain	3	0	6 – 3	13 – 8
2	Kazakhstan	2	1	5 – 3	11 – 7
3	Russia	1	2	4 – 5	9 – 11
4	Germany	0	3	2 – 6	5 – 12

=== Russia vs. Germany ===
Russia
2
Burswood Entertainment Complex, Perth
4 January 2010, 10.00 AWST (UTC+8)
hard (indoors)

Germany
1

			1	2	3
1	(Russia) (Germany)	Elena Dementieva; Sabine Lisicki	4; 6	1; 6
2	(Russia) (Germany)	Igor Andreev; Philipp Kohlschreiber	6; 3	6^{2} 7^{7}	6; 3
3	(Russia) (Germany)	Elena Dementieva / Igor Andreev; Sabine Lisicki / Philipp Kohlschreiber	6; 4	7^{9} 6^{7}

=== Great Britain vs. Kazakhstan ===
Great Britain
2
Burswood Entertainment Complex, Perth
4 January 2010, 17.30 AWST (UTC+8)
hard (indoors)

Kazakhstan
1

			1	2	3
1	(United Kingdom) (Kazakhstan)	Laura Robson; Yaroslava Shvedova	6; 4	3; 6	0; 6
2	(United Kingdom) (Kazakhstan)	Andy Murray; Andrey Golubev	6; 2	6; 2
3	(United Kingdom) (Kazakhstan)	Laura Robson / Andy Murray; Yaroslava Shvedova / Andrey Golubev	6; 3	5; 7	[12] [10]

=== Great Britain vs. Germany ===
Great Britain
2
Burswood Entertainment Complex, Perth
6 January 2010, 10.00 AWST (UTC+8)
hard (indoors)

Germany
1

			1	2	3
1	(United Kingdom) (Germany)	Laura Robson; Sabine Lisicki	6^{5} 7^{7}	3; 6
2	(United Kingdom) (Germany)	Andy Murray; Philipp Kohlschreiber	6; 4	6; 1
3	(United Kingdom) (Germany)	Laura Robson / Andy Murray; Sabine Lisicki / Philipp Kohlschreiber	6; 3	6; 2

=== Russia vs. Kazakhstan ===
Russia
1
Burswood Entertainment Complex, Perth
6 January 2010, 17.30 AWST (UTC+8)
hard (indoors)

Kazakhstan
2

			1	2	3
1	(Russia) (Kazakhstan)	Elena Dementieva; Yaroslava Shvedova	6; 3	6; 1
2	(Russia) (Kazakhstan)	Igor Andreev; Andrey Golubev	4; 6	3; 6
3	(Russia) (Kazakhstan)	Elena Dementieva / Igor Andreev; Yaroslava Shvedova / Andrey Golubev	6^{3} 7^{7}	4; 6

=== Russia vs. Great Britain ===
Russia
1
Burswood Entertainment Complex, Perth
8 January 2010, 10.00 AWST (UTC+8)
hard (indoors)

Great Britain
2

			1	2	3
1	(Russia) (United Kingdom)	Elena Dementieva; Laura Robson	6; 4	6; 0
2	(Russia) (United Kingdom)	Igor Andreev; Andy Murray	1; 6	0; 6
3	(Russia) (United Kingdom)	Elena Dementieva / Igor Andreev; Laura Robson / Andy Murray	4; 6	7^{8} 6^{6}	[6] [10]

=== Germany vs. Kazakhstan ===
Germany
0
Burswood Entertainment Complex, Perth
8 January 2010, 10:00 AWST (UTC+8)
hard (indoors)

Kazakhstan
2

			1	2	3
1	(Germany) (Kazakhstan)	Sabine Lisicki; Yaroslava Shvedova	4; 6	6^{3} 7^{7}
2	(Germany) (Kazakhstan)	Philipp Kohlschreiber; Andrey Golubev	2; 6	1; 6
3	(Germany) (Kazakhstan)	Sabine Lisicki / Philipp Kohlschreiber; Yaroslava Shvedova / Andrey Golubev				not played

== Final ==
Spain
2
Burswood Entertainment Complex, Perth
9 January 2010, 09.30 AWST (UTC+8)
hard (indoors)

Great Britain
1

			1	2	3
1	(Spain) (United Kingdom)	María José Martínez Sánchez; Laura Robson	1; 6	6^{6} 7^{8}
2	(Spain) (United Kingdom)	Tommy Robredo; Andy Murray	1; 6	6; 4	6; 3
3	(Spain) (United Kingdom)	María José Martínez Sánchez / Tommy Robredo; Laura Robson / Andy Murray	7^{8} 6^{6}	7; 5

2010 Hopman Cup Champions
(Spain)
Spain
Third title
