= 2012 Guangzhou International Women's Open – Doubles =

Doubles
- 2012 Guangzhou International Women's Open

Final
- Champion: (Thailand) Tamarine Tanasugarn (China) Zhang Shuai
- Runner-up: (Australia) Jarmila Gajdošová (Romania) Monica Niculescu
- Score: 2–6, 6–2, [10–8]

Events
Singles	Doubles
← 2011 ·	Guangzhou International Women's Open	· 2013 →

The 2012 Guangzhou International Women's open doubles was a women's tennis tournament played on outdoor hard courts in Guangzhou, China.

Hsieh Su-wei and Zheng Saisai were the defending champions, but decided not to participate together. Hsieh played alongside Hsieh Shu-ying, but lost in the quarterfinals to Tamarine Tanasugarn and Zhang Shuai. Zheng competed with Tetiana Luzhanska, but lost in the semifinals to Jarmila Gajdošová and Monica Niculescu.
Tamarine Tanasugarn and Zhang Shuai defeated in the final the first seeded Jarmila Gajdošová and Monica Niculescu with the score 2–6, 6–2, [10–8].

== Seeds ==
1. (Australia) Jarmila Gajdošová / (Romania) Monica Niculescu (final)
2. (Chinese Taipei) Chan Hao-ching / (Chinese Taipei) Chan Yung-jan (quarterfinals, retired)
3. (Thailand) Tamarine Tanasugarn / (China) Zhang Shuai (champions)
4. (Russia) Nina Bratchikova / (Russia) Alla Kudryavtseva (first round)

== Draw ==
=== Key ===
- Q = Qualifier
- WC = Wild card
- LL = Lucky loser
- Alt = Alternate
- SE = Special exempt
- PR = Protected ranking
- ITF = ITF entry
- JE = Junior exempt
- w/o = Walkover
- r = Retired
- d = Defaulted
- SR = Special ranking

First round
1	(Australia) J Gajdošová (Romania) M Niculescu	6	7
(Russia) V Savinykh (China) Y Xu	1	5
(Hungary) T Babos (Luxembourg) M Minella	4	1
WC	(China) Z Yan (Hong Kong) L Zhang	6	6
4	(Russia) N Bratchikova (Russia) A Kudryavtseva	1	7^{7}	[1]
(Japan) S Aoyama (Chinese Taipei) K-c Chang	6	6^{5}	[10]
(France) A Cornet (France) P Parmentier
(United States) T Luzhanska (China) S Zheng	w/o
(Chinese Taipei) S-y Hsieh (Chinese Taipei) S-w Hsieh	4	6	[12]
(Thailand) L Kumkhum (Thailand) V Wongteanchai	6	1	[10]
(Japan) E Sema (Japan) Y Sema	1	2
3	(Thailand) T Tanasugarn (China) S Zhang	6	6
WC	(China) C Liang (China) R Tian	2	6	[6]
(China) X Han (China) W Liu	6	2	[10]
(Chinese Taipei) C-w Chan (China) S Sun	6^{4}	3
2	(Chinese Taipei) H-c Chan (Chinese Taipei) Y-j Chan	7^{7}	6

Quarterfinals
1	(Australia) J Gajdošová (Romania) M Niculescu	6	6
WC	(China) Z Yan (Hong Kong) L Zhang	1	4
(Japan) S Aoyama (Chinese Taipei) K-c Chang	6	4	[12]
(United States) T Luzhanska (China) S Zheng	1	6	[14]
(Chinese Taipei) S-y Hsieh (Chinese Taipei) S-w Hsieh	3	6	[11]
3	(Thailand) T Tanasugarn (China) S Zhang	6	3	[13]
(China) X Han (China) W Liu	5
2	(Chinese Taipei) H-c Chan (Chinese Taipei) Y-j Chan	1^{r}

Semifinals
1	(Australia) J Gajdošová (Romania) M Niculescu	7	7^{7}
(United States) T Luzhanska (China) S Zheng	5	6^{3}
3	(Thailand) T Tanasugarn (China) S Zhang	6	6
(China) X Han (China) W Liu	3	3

Finals
1	(Australia) J Gajdošová (Romania) M Niculescu	6	2	[8]
3	(Thailand) T Tanasugarn (China) S Zhang	2	6	[10]
