= Matman =

- Location in Burma
- Coordinates: 21°57′N 98°52′E
- Country: Myanmar
- State: Shan State
- Self-administered Division: Wa
- District: Matman District
- Township: Matman Township
- Elevation: 4,300 ft (1,300 m)

Population
  - Total: 502
  - Ethnicities: Wa
- Time zone: UTC+6.30 (MST)

Matman is the capital town of Matman Township, Wa Self-Administered Division in northeast Shan State, Myanmar. It is the smallest town in Shan State and the fourth smallest town in Myanmar after Hsawlaw, Injangyang, and Kawnglanghpu. It is also the ninth smallest municipality in the country. In November 2025, the capital of the Wa Self-Administered Division changed from Hopong to Matman. According to the State Security and Peace Commission junta, the change would enable efficiency in government operations.
