= Pang Yang =

Pang Yang Pāng-yāng
- Village
- Location in Burma
- Coordinates: 22°7′N 98°47′E
- Country: Burma
- Division: Shan State (Wa Self-Administered Division)
- District: Matman District
- Township: Matman Township
- Elevation: 4,460 ft (1,360 m)

Population
  - Ethnicities: Wa
- Time zone: UTC+6.30 (MST)

Pang Yang is a village in Matman Township, Shan State. It is part of the Wa Self-Administered Division.

== Geography ==
Matman is located on a hillside about 10 km northeast of the Salween.
