= 2011 Guangzhou International Women's Open – Singles =

Singles
- 2011 Guangzhou International Women's Open

Final
- Champion: (South Africa) Chanelle Scheepers
- Runner-up: (Slovakia) Magdaléna Rybáriková
- Score: 6–2, 6–2

Details
- Draw: 32
- Seeds: 8

Events
| Singles | Doubles |
- Guangzhou International Women's Open

Jarmila Gajdošová was the defending champion, but lost to Magdaléna Rybáriková in the quarterfinals.

Chanelle Scheepers won the title, defeating Rybáriková 6–2, 6–2 in the final. It was her first WTA Tour title.

== Seeds ==
1. (Russia) Maria Kirilenko (semifinals)
2. (Australia) Jarmila Gajdošová (quarterfinals)
3. (Russia) Ksenia Pervak (first round, retired due to left shoulder injury)
4. (Croatia) Petra Martić (quarterfinals)
5. (Serbia) Bojana Jovanovski (first round)
6. (Italy) Alberta Brianti (first round)
7. (South Africa) Chanelle Scheepers (champion)
8. (Slovakia) Magdaléna Rybáriková (final)

== Main draw ==
Key

- Q = Qualifier
- WC = Wild card
- LL = Lucky loser
- Alt = Alternate
- ITF = ITF entry
- PR = Protected ranking
- SR = Special ranking
- SE = Special exempt
- JE = Junior exempt
- JR = Junior Accelerator Programme entrant
- CO = College Accelerator Programme entrant
- NG = Next Gen Accelerator Program entrant
- w/o = Walkover
- r = Retired
- d = Defaulted

=== Finals ===
Semifinals
1 | (Russia) Maria Kirilenko | 5 | 7 | 4
7 | (South Africa) Chanelle Scheepers | 7 | 5 | 6
(China) Zheng Jie | 5 | 3
8 | (Slovakia) Magdaléna Rybáriková | 7 | 6

Final
7 | (South Africa) Chanelle Scheepers | 6 | 6
8 | (Slovakia) Magdaléna Rybáriková | 2 | 2

=== Top half ===
First round
1 | (Russia) M Kirilenko | 6 | 6
(Ukraine) A Bondarenko | 4 | 2
(Ukraine) M Koryttseva | 1 | 3
(France) I Brémond | 6 | 6
Q | (China) Y Zhao | 6 | 6
(Japan) M Doi | 4 | 3
(Ukraine) T Luzhanska | 6 | 4 | 7^{7}
5 | (Serbia) B Jovanovski | 3 | 6 | 6^{4}
3 | (Russia) K Pervak | 1 | r
(Chinese Taipei) Y-j Chan | 4
(Australia) A Rodionova | 6^{5} | 4
(Poland) U Radwańska | 7^{7} | 6
Q | (Chinese Taipei) S-w Hsieh | 6 | 6
WC | (China) J Lu | 0 | 2
(Latvia) A Sevastova | 5 | 6 | 3
7 | (South Africa) C Scheepers | 7 | 1 | 6

Second round
1 | (Russia) M Kirilenko | 6 | 6
(France) I Brémond | 3 | 1
Q | (China) Y Zhao | 4 | 6 | 5
(Ukraine) T Luzhanska | 6 | 2 | 7
(Chinese Taipei) Y-j Chan | 6 | 2 | 2
(Poland) U Radwańska | 2 | 6 | 6
Q | (Chinese Taipei) S-w Hsieh | 6 | 6^{1} | 1
7 | (South Africa) C Scheepers | 3 | 7^{7} | 6

Quarterfinals
1 | (Russia) M Kirilenko | 6 | 7
(Ukraine) T Luzhanska | 1 | 5
(Poland) U Radwańska | 6 | 6^{6} | 3
7 | (South Africa) C Scheepers | 4 | 7^{8} | 6

Semifinals
1 | (Russia) M Kirilenko | 5 | 7 | 4
7 | (South Africa) C Scheepers | 7 | 5 | 6

=== Bottom half ===
First round
6 | (Italy) A Brianti | 6^{3} | 4
(China) J Zheng | 7^{7} | 6
WC | (China) S Zheng | 5 | 0
(Thailand) N Lertcheewakarn | 7 | 6
WC | (China) S Sun | 1 | 4
Q | (Kazakhstan) Z Diyas | 6 | 6
(Chinese Taipei) K-c Chang | 4 | 4
4 | (Croatia) P Martić | 6 | 6
8 | (Slovakia) M Rybáriková | 6 | 4 | 6
(United States) J Craybas | 3 | 6 | 2
(China) S Zhang | 2 | 6^{2}
(France) A Rezaï | 6 | 7^{7}
Q | (China) Y Xu | 6 | 6^{5} | 0
(Luxembourg) M Minella | 2 | 7^{7} | 6
(China) X Han | 2 | 1
2 | (Australia) J Gajdošová | 6 | 6

Second round
(China) J Zheng | 6 | 7
(Thailand) N Lertcheewakarn | 3 | 5
Q | (Kazakhstan) Z Diyas | 6 | 2 | 4
4 | (Croatia) P Martić | 4 | 6 | 6
8 | (Slovakia) M Rybáriková | 6 | 6
(France) A Rezaï | 4 | 1
(Luxembourg) M Minella | 6 | 2 | 3
2 | (Australia) J Gajdošová | 4 | 6 | 6

Quarterfinals
(China) J Zheng | 1 | 6 | 6
4 | (Croatia) P Martić | 6 | 4 | 3
8 | (Slovakia) M Rybáriková | 6 | 6
2 | (Australia) J Gajdošová | 4 | 3

Semifinals
(China) J Zheng | 5 | 3
8 | (Slovakia) M Rybáriková | 7 | 6
