= Matman District =

Matman မက်မန်းခရိုင်
- District
- Matman District in Shan State
- Coordinates: 21°57′0″N 98°52′0″E
- Country: Myanmar
- State: Shan State
- Self-Administered Division: Wa
- Capital: Matman
- Elevation: 4,196 ft (1,279 m)
- Time zone: UTC+6:30 (MMT)

Matman District or Metman District is a district of the Wa Self-Administered Division in northeastern Shan State, Myanmar. It was formerly part of Hopang District. Matman District consists of three townships: Matman, Namphan and Pangsang.
