= 2011 Guangzhou International Women's Open =

- Date: September 19–25
- Edition: 8th
- Category: WTA International tournaments
- Surface: Hard / outdoor
- Location: Guangzhou, China

Champions

Singles
- (South Africa) Chanelle Scheepers

Doubles
- (Chinese Taipei) Hsieh Su-wei / (China) Zheng Saisai
← 2010 ·	Guangzhou International Women's Open	· 2012 →

The 2011 Guangzhou International Women's Open (also known as the WANLIMA Guangzhou International Women's Open for sponsorship reasons) was a women's tennis tournament on outdoor hard courts. It was the 8th edition of the Guangzhou International Women's Open, and part of the WTA International tournaments of the 2011 WTA Tour. It took place in Guangzhou, China, from September 19 through September 18, 2014

== Finals ==
=== Singles ===
(South Africa) Chanelle Scheepers defeated (Slovakia) Magdaléna Rybáriková, 6–2, 6–2

- It was Scheeper's 1st career title. She became the first South African woman to win a title since Amanda Coetzer in 2003.

=== Doubles ===
(Chinese Taipei) Hsieh Su-wei / (China) Zheng Saisai defeated (Chinese Taipei) Chan Chin-wei / (China) Han Xinyun, 6–2, 6–1

== Entrants ==
=== Seeds ===
Country	Player	Rank^{1}	Seed
RUS	Maria Kirilenko	28	1
AUS	Jarmila Gajdošová	30	2
RUS	Ksenia Pervak	52	3
CRO	Petra Martić	54	5
SRB	Bojana Jovanovski	56	6
ITA	Alberta Brianti	58	6
RSA	Chanelle Scheepers	69	7
SVK	Magdaléna Rybáriková	72	8

- ^{1} Seeds are based on the rankings of September 12, 2011.

=== Other entrants ===
The following players received wildcards into the singles main draw:

- (China) Lu Jingjing
- (China) Sun Shengnan
- (China) Zheng Saisai

The following players received entry from the qualifying draw:

- (Kazakhstan) Zarina Diyas
- (Chinese Taipei) Hsieh Su-wei
- (China) Xu Yifan
- (China) Zhao Yijing
