= Laura Robson =

British tennis player (born 1994)

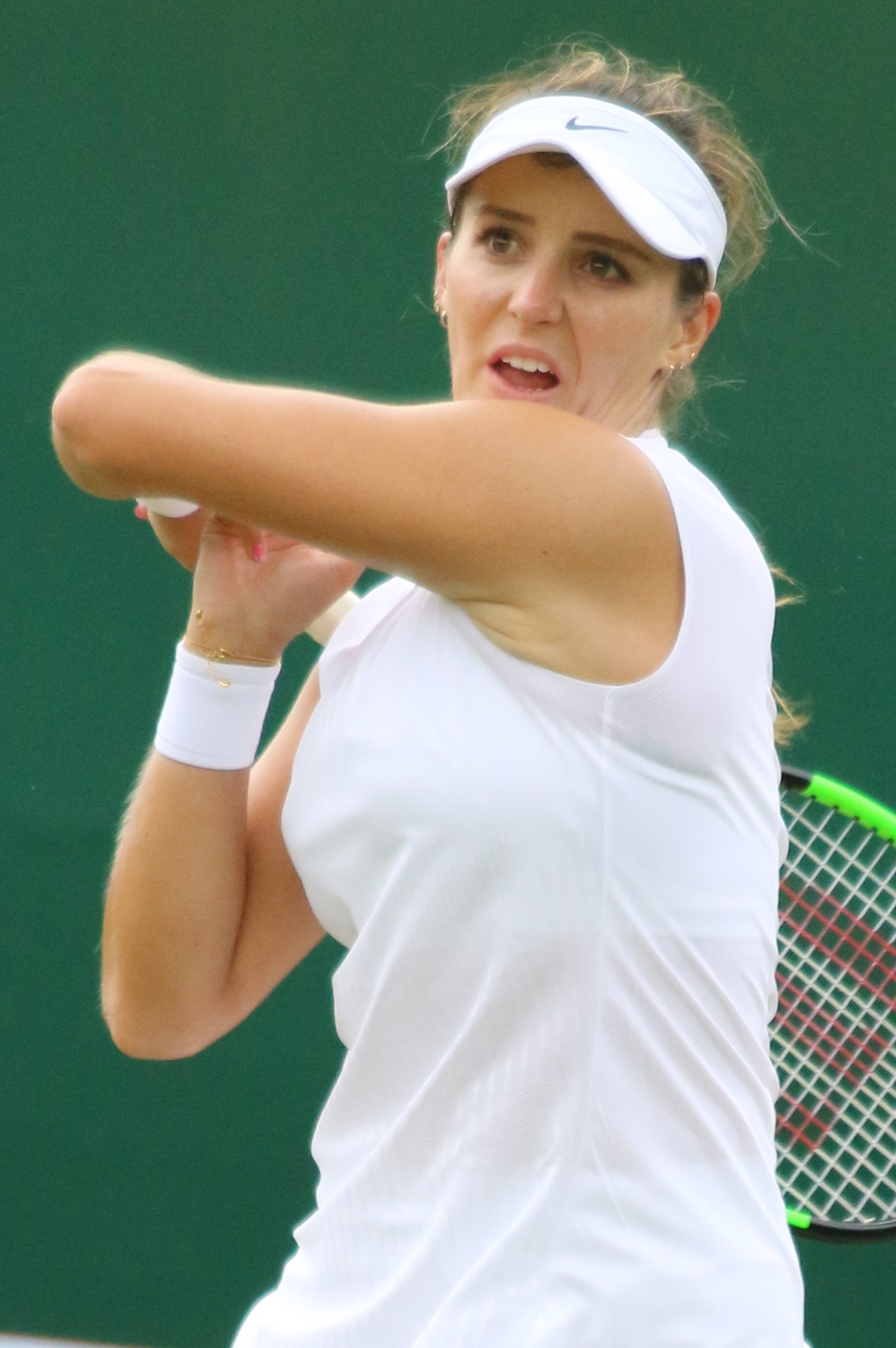
- Laura Robson at the 2017 Wimbledon Championships
- Country (sports): United Kingdom
- Residence: London, UK
- Born: 21 January 1994 (age 32) Melbourne, Australia
- Height: 5 ft 11 in (1.80 m)
- Turned pro: 2008
- Retired: May 2022
- Plays: Left-handed (two-handed backhand)
- Coach: Martijn Bok (2007–2010); Patrick Mouratoglou (2011); Luke Milligan (2011–2012); Željko Krajan (2012–2013); Miles Maclagan (2013); Nick Saviano (2013); Jesse Witten (2013); Mauricio Hadad (2014–2016)
- Prize money: $1,605,607

Singles
- Career record: 176–166
- Career titles: 0
- Highest ranking: No. 27 (8 July 2013)

Grand Slam singles results
- Australian Open: 3R (2013)
- French Open: 1R (2012, 2013, 2016)
- Wimbledon: 4R (2013)
- US Open: 4R (2012)

Other tournaments
- Olympic Games: 2R (2012)

Doubles
- Career record: 75–67
- Career titles: 0
- Highest ranking: No. 82 (17 March 2014)

Grand Slam doubles results
- Australian Open: QF (2010)
- Wimbledon: 2R (2009, 2013, 2017)
- US Open: 2R (2015)

Grand Slam mixed doubles results
- Wimbledon: 3R (2012)

Team competitions
- Fed Cup: 13–3
- Hopman Cup: F (2010)
Medal record
Representing Great Britain
Silver medal – second place	2012 London	Mixed doubles

Laura Robson (born 21 January 1994) is a British former professional tennis player. She debuted on the ITF Junior Circuit in 2007, and a year later won the Junior Wimbledon championships at the age of 14. As a junior, she also twice reached the final of the girls' singles tournament at the Australian Open, in 2009 and 2010. She won her first tournament on the ITF Women's Circuit in November 2008.

In singles tennis, Robson was the first British woman since Samantha Smith at Wimbledon in 1998 to reach the fourth round of a Grand Slam tournament, doing so at the 2012 US Open and the 2013 Wimbledon Championships. At the 2012 Guangzhou International Open, Robson became the first British woman since Jo Durie in 1990 to reach a WTA Tour final, where she lost to Hsieh Su-wei. She was named WTA Newcomer of the Year for 2012 and reached a career-high singles ranking of world No. 27 the following year. In mixed doubles, she won a silver medal at the 2012 London Olympics playing with Andy Murray, with whom she also reached the 2010 Hopman Cup final. She has a career-high doubles ranking of No. 82 (July 2013).

Robson suffered from various injuries throughout the 2014 and 2015 seasons, notably to her left (and dominant) wrist for which she underwent surgery in April 2014, resulting in multiple prolonged absences from the WTA Tour. After returning to full-time tennis in 2016, Robson struggled with form and did not return to the top 150 in singles tennis. In July 2018, she underwent hip surgery, and she did not return to the WTA Tour afterwards. On 16 May 2022, Robson announced her retirement from tennis, aged 28. Since her retirement, Robson was tournament director at the Nottingham Open in 2023 and 2024, before being appointed to the same role at the new women's event at Queen's Club in 2025. She continued in the role for the women's event at Queen's Club in 2026 which was notable for the return of Serena Williams.

She now works as a presenter and pundit.

== Early life and junior career ==
Robson was born on 21 January 1994 in Melbourne, the third child of Australian parents Andrew, an oil executive with Shell, and Kathy Robson, a sports coach and former professional basketball player. Robson and her family moved from Melbourne to Singapore when she was 18 months old, where she attended Tanglin Trust School, and then to the United Kingdom when she was six.

According to her parents, she began playing tennis "as soon as she could hold a tennis racquet", and after being encouraged by them, she entered a junior tennis academy at age seven. She signed with management company Octagon when she was ten, with Adidas at age 11, and also signed a racquet deal with Wilson Sporting Goods.

After working with several coaches, including the head of the Lawn Tennis Association Carl Maes, she chose coach Martijn Bok in 2007. Bok said later that although Robson "had trouble staying emotionally under control", he "saw right away...a lot of potential in Laura." Robson also began training at the National Tennis Centre, under the guidance of Bok, Maes, and the head of women's tennis at the centre, Nigel Sears, while taking school lessons at home.

Robson's first tournament on the Junior ITF Circuit was in 2007. She went from the qualifying draw of the tournament to the quarterfinals, and reached the final of two other tournaments, and won her first title in October. In the first half of 2008, she reached the finals of three tournaments, but was also eliminated before the third round in three straight tournaments.

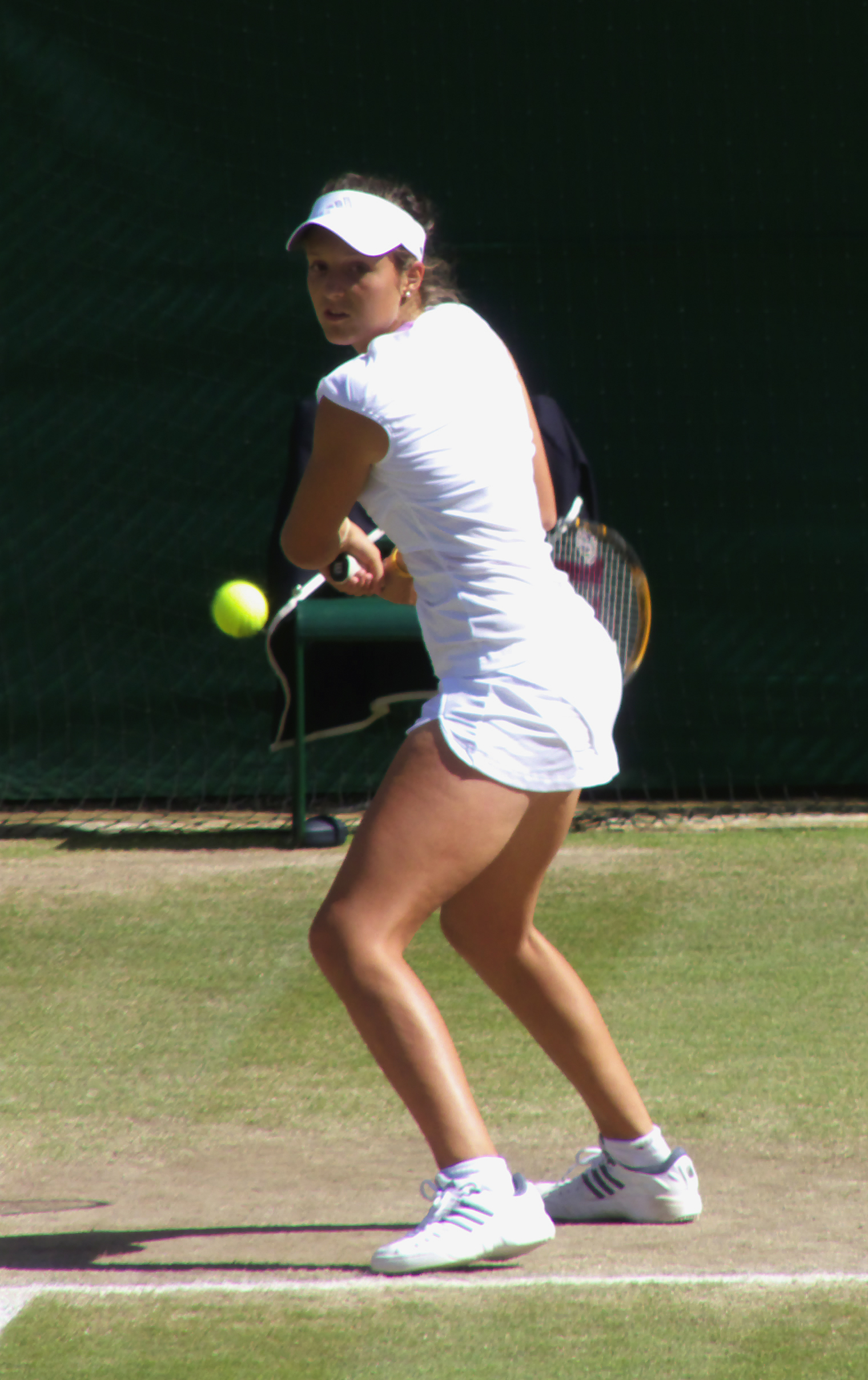
Robson on her way to winning the girls' title at Wimbledon

Robson competed in her first junior Grand Slam at the Wimbledon girls' event, as an unseeded player. As the youngest player in the tournament, she beat top seed Melanie Oudin on her way to the finals where she defeated third seed Noppawan Lertcheewakarn. Her victory made her the first British player to win the girls' event since Annabel Croft in 1984, and the British media described her as the "new darling" of British tennis, and the "Queen of Wimbledon".

After a brief period on the main tour, Robson returned to junior competition but was knocked out in the second round of a tournament in December. In the same month she played her final junior tournament of 2008, the Orange Bowl, where she had to retire in the third round with a stomach strain. At the end of the year, she was shortlisted for the BBC Young Sports Personality of the Year, but lost out to Paralympic swimmer Eleanor Simmonds.

After recovering from her injury, Robson entered the junior tournament of the 2009 Australian Open, where she was seeded fifth. In the semifinals she faced a replay of her Wimbledon final, against top seed Tara Flanagan, whom she beat in straight sets to reach her second Grand Slam junior final. Facing third seed Ksenia Pervak from Russia, Robson was defeated in straight sets. She later attributed her loss to Pervak's greater consistency, and her coach Bok said that "everybody has to be patient". After the tournament, Robson started to train with Gil Reyes, the former trainer of Andre Agassi. She was also named the MCC Young Sportswoman of the Year. She claimed the top ranking of ITF Junior Tour in April, despite not playing for two months because of shin splints.

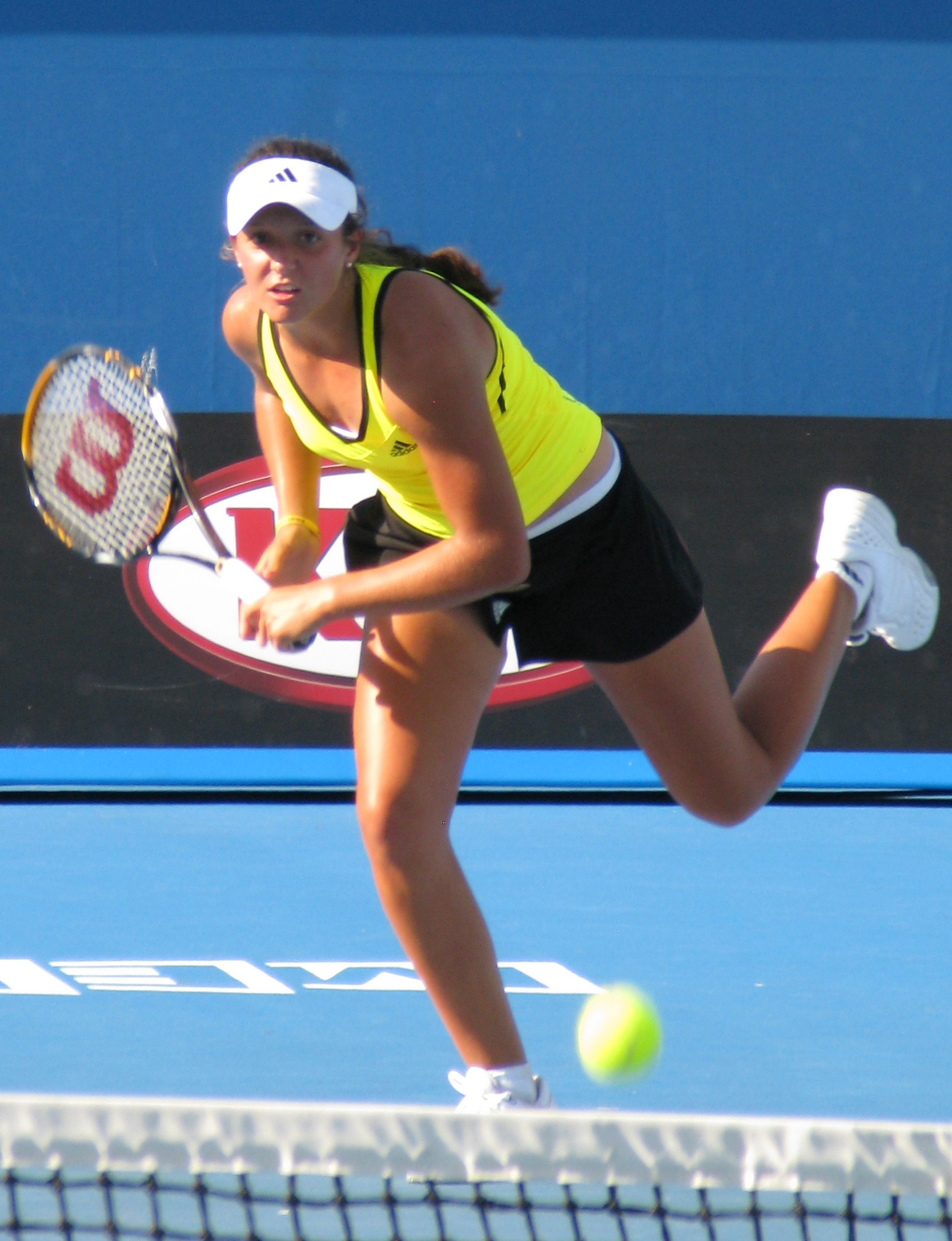
Robson on her way to her second junior Grand Slam final at the 2009 Australian Open; she repeated the trip a year later

At the French Open, Robson was the top seed in the junior's competition, but was defeated in round two by Sandra Zaniewska. Robson was the defending champion at Wimbledon, but she fell in the second round to Quirine Lemoine.

Due to her focusing on her senior career, Robson entered the US Open unseeded. In the first round, she beat Ons Jabeur of Tunisia. She then faced the seventh seed Lauren Embree of the United States and beat her in three sets. She went on to face the 12th seed, Tamaryn Hendler, who she defeated in straight sets. Robson then beat Lauren Davis in the quarterfinals. In her semifinal, she faced Yana Buchina of Russia. Due to rain delay, both quarter- and semifinals were played on the same day. Therefore, the semifinal followed the quarterfinal match. Despite starting strongly, Robson tired, losing the match in three sets.

At the junior singles at the 2010 Australian Open, Robson was unseeded and defeated Belinda Woolcock, Yulia Putintseva, and Cristina Dinu to reach the quarterfinals. In the last eight, she easily overcame American Ester Goldfeld to move through to her fourth junior Grand Slam semifinal where she defeated Kristýna Plíšková of the Czech Republic. She was defeated by Kristýna's twin sister Karolína in the final. In the Wimbledon junior singles she reached the semifinals, losing to Sachie Ishizu of Japan.

== Professional career ==
=== 2008 ===
Following her victory at Wimbledon, Robson made her debut on the ITF Women's Circuit at a $10k tournament in Limoges, France. She won two matches to qualify for the main draw of the tournament, as well as her first-round match, before having to retire with a shoulder injury in the second round against the second seed Marina Melnikova.

Robson was then given a wildcard into the main draw of the $75k event in Shrewsbury. After beating 2007 Wimbledon girls' singles champion Urszula Radwańska and fourth seed Tzipi Obziler, Robson lost to second seed Maret Ani in three sets in the semifinals. She was given another wildcard into the $50k in Barnstaple, but was defeated in three sets in her first round match against the seventh seed Angelique Kerber, who later said that it was "unbelievable how she's playing".

Her first match on the WTA Tour was courtesy of a wildcard into the Luxembourg Open where she lost in the first round against world No. 42, Iveta Benešová. Returning to the ITF Circuit, Robson entered as the fifth seed in a 10k event held in Sunderland, Tyne and Wear. After beating third seed Laura Ioana Andrei in the quarterfinals, she also beat fellow Brits Tara Moore and Samantha Vickers in straight sets to win her first ITF title at the age of 14 years and 9 months.

=== 2009 ===
Robson returned to the junior circuit for the first half of 2009. On 9 June, Wimbledon announced that Robson received a wildcard for the singles event. She faced former world No. 5 and 2002 Wimbledon quarterfinalist, Daniela Hantuchová, in the first round but lost despite being a break up in the second set. With Georgie Stoop she also entered into the doubles tournament, progressing to the second round before losing to 16th seeds, Svetlana Kuznetsova and Amélie Mauresmo.

In August 2009, Robson received also a wildcard into the US Open qualifying. She defeated Stéphanie Foretz in the first round in straight sets, and went on to beat Anikó Kapros of Hungary. In the final round, she lost to Eva Hrdinová, after leading 4–1 in the third set.

On 17 October, Robson entered the qualifying draw at the Luxembourg Open. In the first round, she defeated world No. 180, Zuzana Ondrášková, and in the second Julia Görges, the world No. 79. In the final round of qualifying, she lost to Maria Elena Camerin. On 10 November, Robson beat Yuliya Beygelzimer in the first round of the Minsk ITF event. She defeated Tetyana Arefyeva in the second round but was defeated in the quarterfinals by Vitalia Diatchenko.

=== 2010 ===
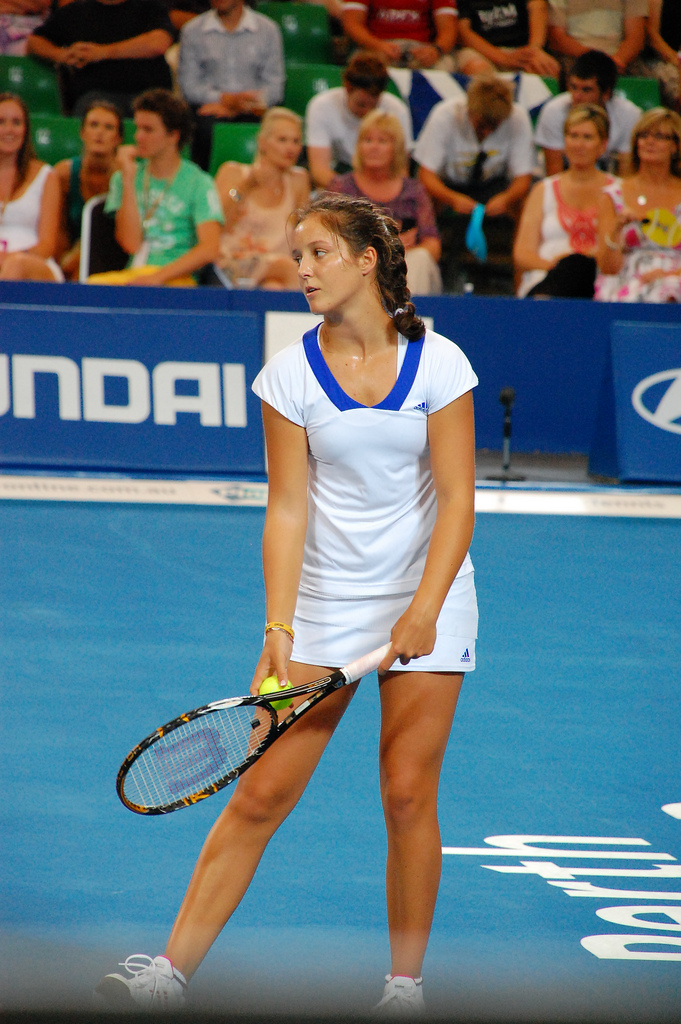
During the 2010 Hopman Cup

Robson began the season playing with Andy Murray in the Hopman Cup, as part of Britain's first team in the tournament since 1992. She lost her opening match to Yaroslava Shvedova of Kazakhstan. Later in the day she won the mixed-doubles match against Kazakhstan, partnering with Murray to secure a win. Robson was defeated by Sabine Lisicki but won the mixed doubles against Germany. Robson and Murray defeated Russia to advance to the finals. Despite her first win of the tournament against world No. 26, María José Martínez Sánchez, Robson and Murray lost to Spain's Martínez Sánchez and Tommy Robredo in a very close match.

Robson was granted a wildcard in the qualifying draw for the women's singles of the Australian Open. In her first match, she defeated Sophie Ferguson of Australia. In her second match, she lost to Michaëlla Krajicek. Robson, however, received a wildcard into the main draw of the doubles, partnering Sally Peers. They defeated Jill Craybas and Abigail Spears to set up a second-round clash with the 12th seeds Chuang Chia-jung and Květa Peschke, who they beat in straight sets. Peers and Robson won their third-round clash with Vera Dushevina and Anastasia Rodionova to advance to the quarterfinals, before falling to the No. 15 seeds, Maria Kirilenko and Agnieszka Radwańska.

After the Australian Open, Robson did not play again until the start of April. In her third tournament back, she made the semifinal losing to Edina Gallovits of the ITF event in Dothan, after having to qualify for the main draw. She also played in the doubles, and after reaching the quarterfinals, she reached a career high of No. 102 for doubles. She followed this up with a quarterfinal appearance in Charlottesville losing to Anastasiya Yakimova.

She then qualified for the main draw of the Aegon Classic in Edgbaston, after receiving a wildcard for the qualifying. She beat Nina Bratchikova and Vitalia Diatchenko. Robson then went on to win her first-ever match on the WTA Tour, after her opponent Stefanie Vögele retired during the second set of their first-round match. She lost to the third seed Yanina Wickmayer in the second round. She also received a wildcard for the Rosmalen Open but was beaten by Dominika Cibulková in the first round.

She received a wildcard for Wimbledon, and faced fourth seed Jelena Janković to whom she lost in two sets. Robson's next senior level competition was a GB Pro-Series event at Woking. Seeded seventh, her first senior seeding, she reached the quarterfinals. Her next competitive match did not come till the end of August 2010, when she entered the qualifying tournament for the US Open. In the first round she shocked second seed Jelena Dokić. She beat Vesna Manasieva, but lost in the third round to Nuria Llagostera Vives.

On 21 September, Robson announced that she was to split with her coach Martijn Bok, as Bok was unwilling to meet her more demanding 2011 tour schedule.

Robson next competed in the Pan Pacific Open. She beat world No. 57, Anastasija Sevastova, in the first round of qualifying and reached the main draw by beating world No. 100, Simona Halep. She was defeated in the first round of the main draw by the experienced 31-year-old player Gréta Arn.

=== 2011 ===
For 2011, Robson hired a new coach, Frenchman Patrick Mouratoglou, and moved her working base to Paris. Her season was disrupted by injury at the Hopman Cup and she did not compete in a tournament until March 2011; her comeback was then delayed for a further month by an injury in her second competition. Returning again at the end of April 2011, Robson's best performance to date came at the 50k tournament at Indian Harbor Beach, Florida, where she reached the semifinals. Robson split from Mouratoglou just before Wimbledon. She then won her first match at a Grand Slam tournament as she defeated Angelique Kerber, but lost to Maria Sharapova in the second round.

At the US Open, Robson won her three qualifying matches to advance into the main draw. In the first round of the main draw, she was leading when her opponent, Ayumi Morita, retired from the match. She was then beaten by Anabel Medina Garrigues.

=== 2012: First WTA Tour final, Olympic mixed doubles silver medalist ===
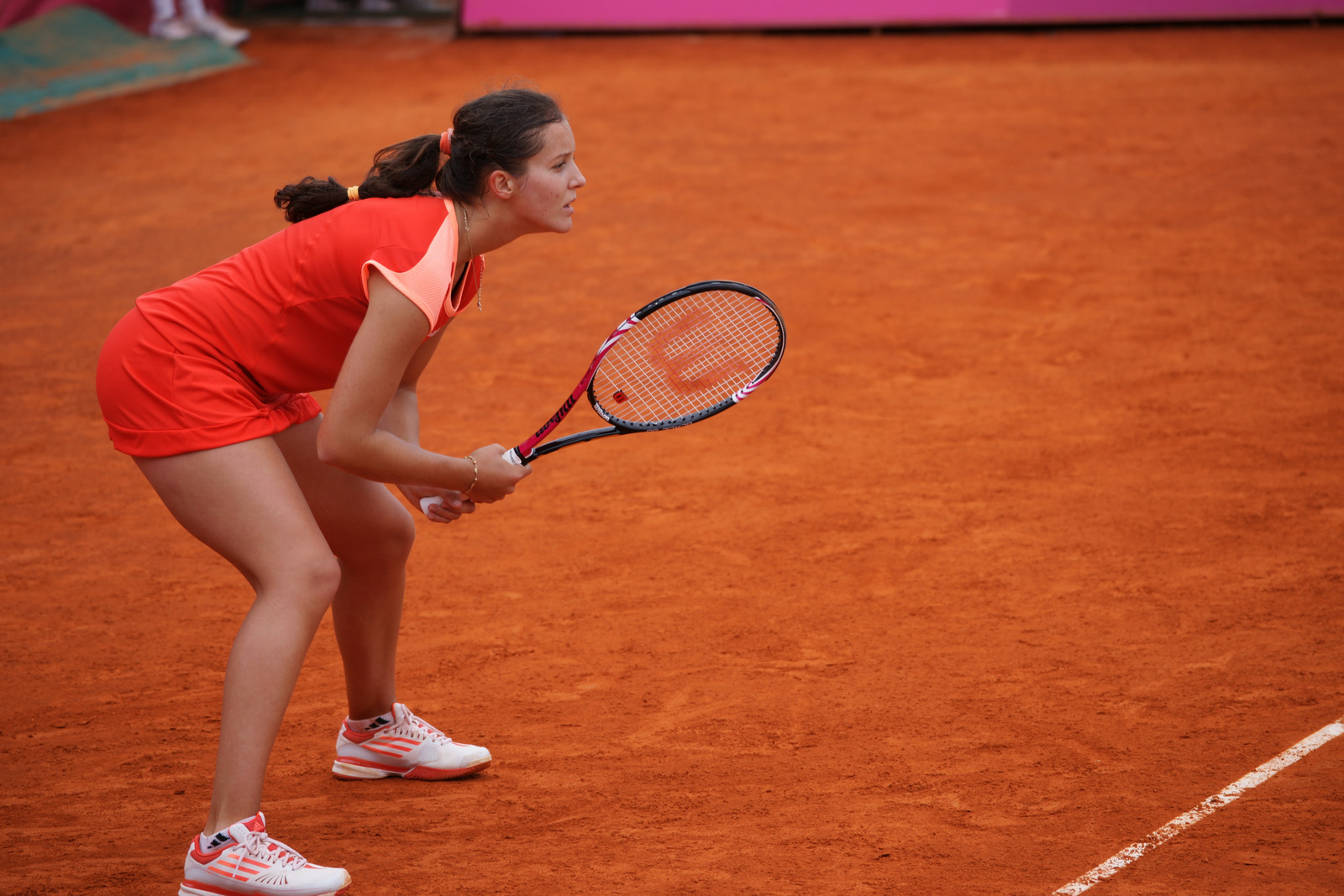
Laura Robson at the 2012 Open de Cagnes-sur-Mer

Robson came through three rounds of qualifying at the Australian Open, beating Melanie Oudin, Anna Floris and Olga Savchuk to advance to the main draw for the first time. She lost to 13th seed Jelena Janković in the first round.

Robson was selected for the first time in her career to be a member of British Fed Cup team to play in the Europe/Africa Group-1 match at Eilat, Israel, on 1–4 February 2012. In the group stages she played doubles with Heather Watson, defeating pairs from Portugal, Netherlands and Israel in the group stages. Robson and Watson did not need to play the play-off match against Austria as Anne Keothavong and Elena Baltacha won their singles rubbers, and the 2–0 lead qualified the team for a place in the World Group-II promotion play-off in April 2012.

Robson lost in the third round of qualifying for the 2012 French Open at Roland Garros. However, she got a place in the first round of the main draw as a lucky loser when Sílvia Soler Espinosa withdrew, but then lost her first-round match to Anabel Medina Garrigues.

After a second round showing at the Birmingham Classic (lost to Marina Erakovic), Robson came through qualifying at the Eastbourne International. She reached the second round before losing to Ekaterina Makarova. However, the result helped Robson break into the top 100 for the first time in her career. In the first round of Wimbledon, Robson lost to Francesca Schiavone in three sets.

Immediately after Wimbledon, Robson entered the Palermo Ladies Open where she reached her first ever WTA Tour semifinal. After beating the world No. 240, Valentyna Ivakhnenko, for the loss of just one game in the first round, she shocked the No. 2 seed and world No. 27, Roberta Vinci, in straight sets to reach her first ever WTA quarterfinal. She continued her good form in the quarterfinal, where she emerged victorious against No. 5 seed, Carla Suárez Navarro, in three sets. However, her run came to an end when she lost in the semifinals to Barbora Záhlavová-Strýcová in three sets. Robson then received a wildcard to enter the main draw of the Swedish Open but lost her first match against Medina Garrigues.

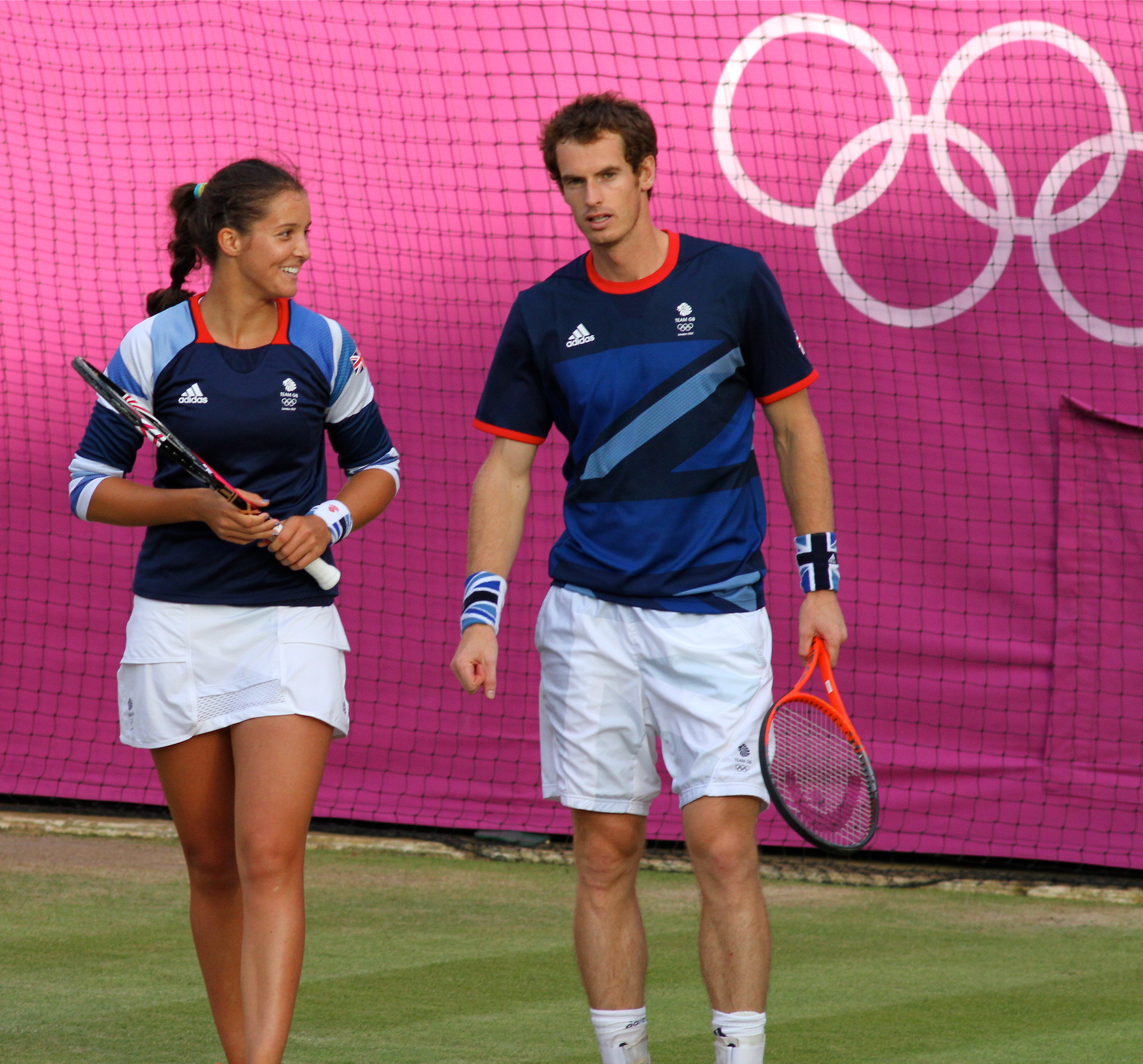
With Andy Murray in the mixed doubles at the 2012 Summer Olympics

She received a late place into the women's singles at the 2012 Olympics due to the withdrawal of Croatian Petra Martić. In her first-round match, she beat the world No. 22, Lucie Šafářová, in straight sets, setting up a second round encounter with Maria Sharapova. She lost to the Russian world No. 3 in a tightly contested match. She also competed in the doubles competition with Heather Watson, losing in the first round to the German pairing of Angelique Kerber and Sabine Lisicki. She then received a wildcard entry into the mixed doubles with Andy Murray. They were drawn against Czech pair Lucie Hradecká/Radek Štěpánek in the first round and won in three sets. In the second round, the pair beat the Australian duo of Lleyton Hewitt and Samantha Stosur, and reached the final by beating Germans Sabine Lisicki and Christopher Kas, where they were beaten by the Belarusian pair Victoria Azarenka and Max Mirnyi.

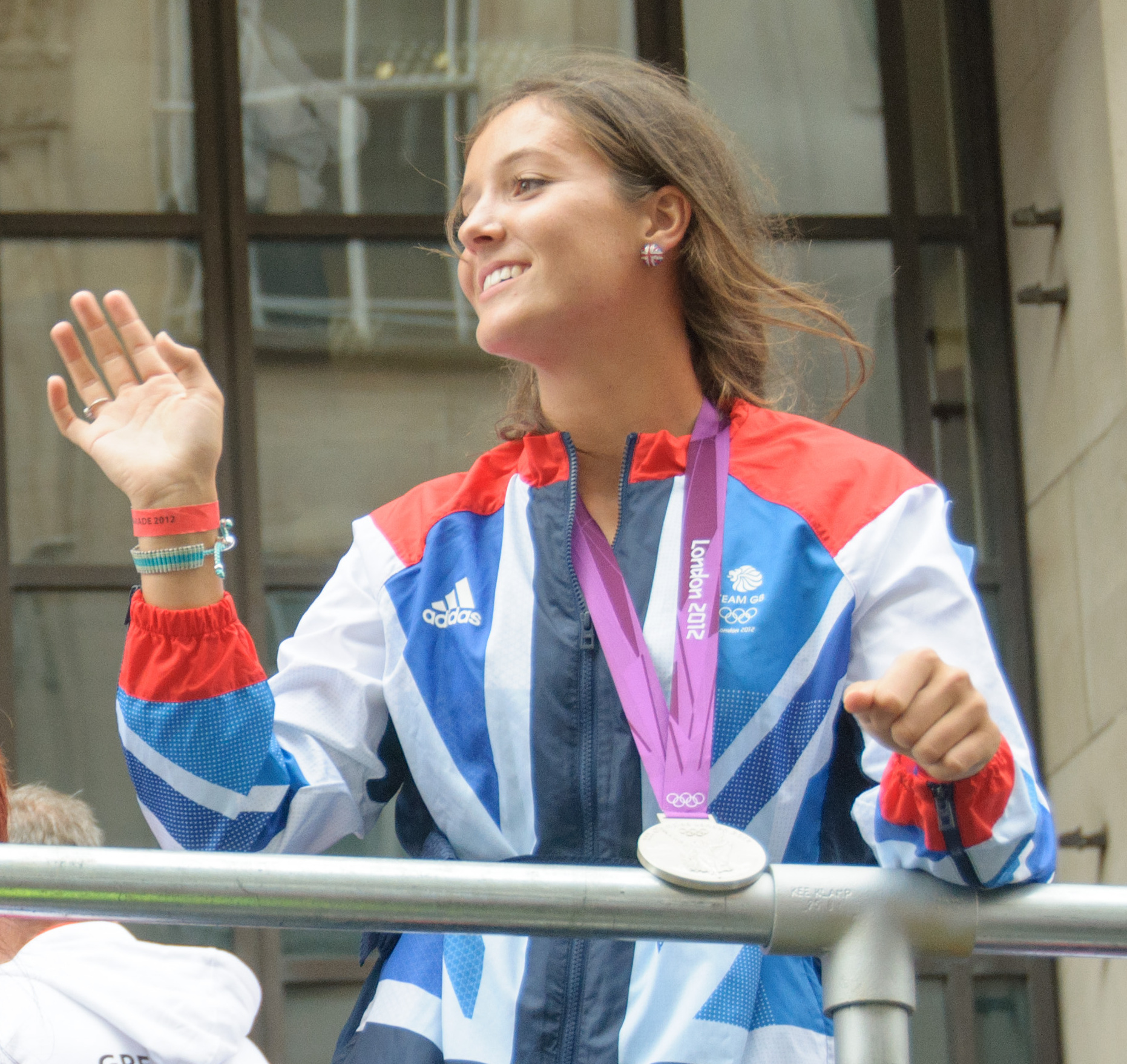
Robson wearing her mixed doubles silver medal

Robson had direct entry to the main draw of the US Open from her WTA ranking, where she defeated Samantha Crawford in the first round. In the second, she defeated former US Open champion Kim Clijsters in Clijsters' final singles match before her retirement. Robson consequently reached the third round of a major tournament for the first time in her career and joined Serena Williams, Lindsay Davenport, Venus Williams, Amélie Mauresmo and Justine Henin as one of the only six people to beat Clijsters at the US Open championships, and the first player to beat her there since 2003. She followed up her performance with her first victory over a top-ten player, beating ninth seed Li Na in the third round, in three sets. Robson became the first female British tennis player to reach this stage of a Grand Slam tournament since Samantha Smith reached the fourth round of Wimbledon 14 years previously, but she was defeated by defending champion Stosur, ending her best run at a Grand Slam tournament to date.

Her next appearance was at the Guangzhou Open where she beat the then world No. 22, Zheng Jie, and the No. 3 seed Sorana Cîrstea on the way to her first WTA Tour final against Hsieh Su-wei. This was the first WTA singles final for any British woman since Jo Durie in 1990. Robson was eventually defeated, having saved five championship points in the second set and despite taking a 3–0 lead in the third set. The result pushed her ranking inside the top 70 for the first time.

Robson qualified for the main draw of the China Open after defeating Garbiñe Muguruza and Johanna Larsson and reached the second round but she lost to Lourdes Domínguez Lino in straight sets. At the Japan Women's Open in Osaka, she was seeded eighth, the first time in her career she had been seeded at a WTA tournament. She reached the quarterfinals before losing to Chang Kai-chen in three sets, but the result ensured that she finished the year with a ranking of 53.

In October, Robson was nominated for the Sports Journalists' Association Sportswoman of the Year. In November, along with Heather Watson, won "Young Sportswoman of the Year" at the 2012 Sunday Times Sportswomen of the Year Awards. Robson was also nominated for "WTA Newcomer of the Year" and William Hill "Sportswoman of the Year" in November, winning the former award.

=== 2013: Career-high ranking ===
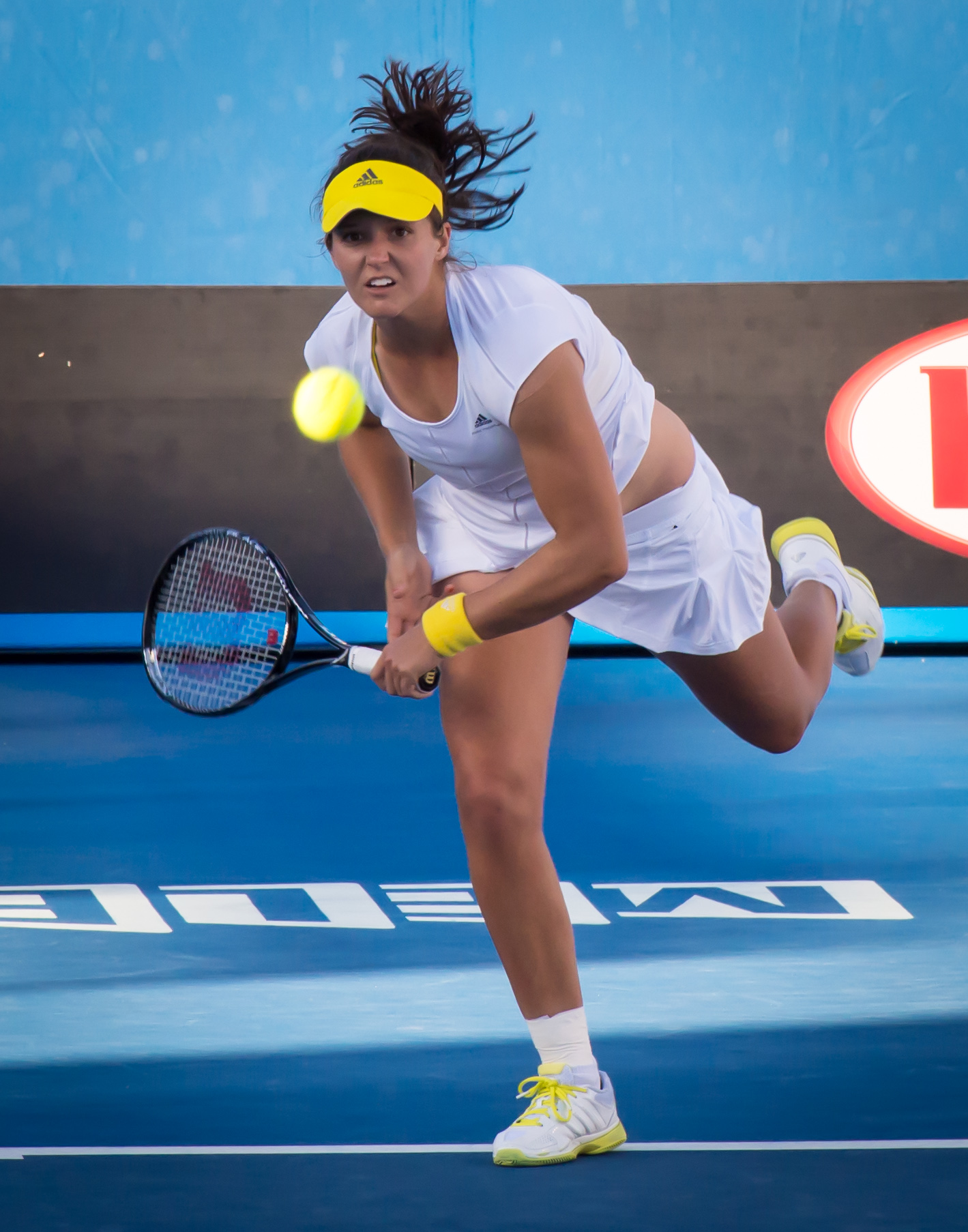
Laura Robson at the 2013 Australian Open

At the start of the year, Robson had reached the top 50 for the first time in her career. She followed this up with her first victory at the Australian Open with a convincing straight sets victory over Melanie Oudin. In the second round she played former Wimbledon champion, and fellow left-hander, Petra Kvitová. Robson came back after losing the first set to beat Kvitová in a three-hour match, to set up a third-round meeting with Sloane Stephens. After stopping for several shoulder treatments, Robson was eventually beaten in two sets. After the Australian Open, Robson played six matches in Fed Cup competition that saw Great Britain earn a World Group II play-off spot against Argentina. Following this success, she went on to lose two successive matches, losing to Daniela Hantuchová in Doha and to wildcard Yulia Putintseva in Dubai.

At Indian Wells, Robson lost her first-round match against Sofia Arvidsson in three sets. Her next tournament was at Miami. In the singles, Robson reached the second round before losing to Alizé Cornet. In the doubles Laura Robson was given a wildcard to play with Lisa Raymond. The pair reached the final, beating the world No. 1 pairing of Sara Errani and Roberta Vinci, in straight sets in the semifinals, before losing to Nadia Petrova and Katarina Srebotnik.

Robson was seeded 16th at Charleston and reached the second round before losing to Eugenie Bouchard in three sets. At the Katowice Open, Robson was seeded eighth, but lost in the first round to Lourdes Domínguez Lino.

Robson represented Great Britain in the Fed Cup World Group II play-off against Argentina. After Johanna Konta lost her opening rubber to Paula Ormaechea, Robson easily won her first match over Florencia Molinero. Robson lost her second match against Paula Ormaechea in three sets.

After several first-round defeats at the start to the European clay-court season, Robson defeated world No. 4, Agnieszka Radwańska, in the second round of the Madrid Open. She subsequently lost to former world No. 1, Ana Ivanovic, in the next round, having led 5–2 in the final set. Robson then made her debut at the Italian Open where she defeated Venus Williams in the first round but subsequently lost to her sister, world No. 1 and eventual champion, Serena Williams, in the second round. At the French Open Robson was beaten in the first round by former world No. 1, Caroline Wozniacki, in straight sets.

To begin the grass-court season, Robson entered the Birmingham Classic where she was seeded seventh. Despite the seeding, she lost in straight sets to the eventual champion Daniela Hantuchová. She then participated in the Eastbourne International. In the first round, she faced Yuliya Beygelzimer in which she won in straight sets. In the second round, she lost to Caroline Wozniacki in straight sets for the second time in a row.

In the first round of Wimbledon, she was drawn against tenth seed Maria Kirilenko, whom she beat in straight sets. She beat world No. 117, Mariana Duque, in the second round on Centre Court. In the third round, she came from a set down to beat Marina Erakovic to progress to the last 16 where she was beaten by Kaia Kanepi. Her performance pushed her up to 27 in the world, the first Briton in the top 30 since Jo Durie in 1987.

Robson started her US Open Series campaign on 30 July 2013 at the Southern California Open in Carlsbad being drawn against Ayumi Morita, whom she beat having come back from a set down in two hours and 40 minutes. Laura moved into the second round faced with the world No. 7 Petra Kvitová from Czech Republic but lost in straight sets putting an end to her Southern California Open.

To start the Canadian Open in Toronto, Robson was due to play Yanina Wickmayer on 5 August 2013 in her opening match, but had to pull out due to a wrist injury. The same injury also led to her pulling out of the tournament in Cincinnati, however her ranking of No. 32 meant that she would be seeded at a Grand Slam tournament for the first time in her career, entering the US Open as the 30th seed.

At the US Open, Robson returned after intensive rehab on her wrist injury and began her campaign against Spain's Lourdes Domínguez Lino, whom she had lost to twice previously. After winning a scrappy first set, Robson powered through the second at love. In the second round, she faced world No. 75 Caroline Garcia, and won in two tight sets. She then fell in straight sets in the next round to Li Na in the same place they had played last year, where Robson had won. The fifth seed Li powered 11 aces to beat her 12-year younger opponent, Robson in straight sets. After a break of around three weeks, Robson returned to action at the Guangzhou Open, a tournament in which she was a finalist the previous year. She started strongly, with straight sets wins over qualifier Jovana Jakšić in the first round, and Zheng Saisai in the second round. She subsequently lost to another Chinese player in Zheng Jie, despite taking the first set 6–1.

In October 2013, it was announced that Miles Maclagan's coaching partnership with Laura had ended and that she would be taking a couple of weeks out and starting the search for a new coach.

=== 2014–15: Wrist injury, extended absence ===
Robson started her 2014 season at the Hobart International, where she had to retire in her first-round match against Yanina Wickmayer due to a left wrist injury. Her wrist continued to affect her at the Australian Open, where Kirsten Flipkens defeated her in straight sets. After taking three-months rest from the tour, Robson underwent surgery on her left wrist in April. The surgery forced her to miss the French Open, Wimbledon and the US Open, and although Robson initially hoped to be playing by the end of the season, she only started training in October, and did not play again in 2014.

Robson did not enter the Australian Open in 2015 and subsequently left the WTA rankings, having not competed for 12 months. Robson planned to return at the 25k tournament at Surprise, Arizona, but delayed her return and did not enter another ITF event in February. She declined a wildcard into the qualifying event of the Miami Open in March. Her agent Eisenbund stated that she had not suffered a setback, and was "closer and closer" to a return.

After an absence of a year and a half, Robson's first competitive match was at the qualifying draw of the Eastbourne International when she lost to top-seed Daria Gavrilova, in straight sets. Robson was granted a wildcard to compete at Wimbledon, but she was defeated in the first round by Evgeniya Rodina.

In July 2015, she played at the 50k event in Granby and won a tough three-set match over second seed Naomi Osaka. However, she lost her next match to American qualifier Ellie Halbauer. Robson also reached the final in doubles partnering Erin Routliffe. In Gatineau, she retired from her first-round match, generating fear that her wrist injury had returned, but Robson said that she had been hampered by a stomach strain she had suffered during practice.

=== 2016: Return to tennis, struggle with form ===
After receiving some further surgery on her wrist at the end of 2015, Robson took some more time off from tennis and subsequently missed the Australian Open. She started off the year playing some American Challenger events, with limited success. She made her return to WTA Tour events by using her protected ranking to enter Indian Wells. Here she made a reasonable effort in her first round but lost to Magdaléna Rybáriková who subsequently went on to reach the quarterfinals of the event. She also received a wildcard entry into the main draw of Miami and used her protected ranking to enter into the qualifying of Charleston but lost in the first round at both events.

Robson later won her first WTA match since her injury in 2013 by beating Klára Koukalová, 6–2, 6–3 in the qualifying of Stuttgart. However, she lost her next match in qualifying to Océane Dodin in straight sets. She also claimed her first WTA Tour main-draw victory since 2013 in Rabat by defeating local wildcard Ghita Benhadi in straight sets. However, she later lost her next match to Tímea Babos.

Robson also used her protected ranking to enter Premier clay events in Madrid and Rome, where she lost her first round matches to Victoria Azarenka and Christina McHale, respectively. She had put on a promising display against Azarenka, but was unable to convert eight out of nine breakpoints, allowing Azarenka to clinch victory in straight sets. Robson was awarded a wildcard into Wimbledon for a second year, but was defeated in 69 minutes by Angelique Kerber in the first round in an error-strewn performance. In August Robson won a second tier ITF tournament in USA. She was then given a wildcard entry to the 2016 US Open qualifying tournament. Straight-set victories over Jang Su-jeong, Isabella Shinikova and Tatjana Maria gained her entry to the main draw of the tournament, losing in the first round to fellow Brit Naomi Broady, 7–6, 3–6, 4–6.

After the US Open, Robson lost in the first round in four out of six ITF tournaments, including a loss to a player ranked 1048.

=== 2017: Continued struggle with form ===
Robson began her 2017 season at the Auckland, but lost in the first round of qualifying to Tereza Martincová. At the Australian Open, she also lost in the first round of qualifying to Amandine Hesse, in straight sets. She then played in the 60k tournament at Andrézieux-Bouthéon and reached the quarterfinals, before losing in straight sets to Amra Sadiković. Between the end of January and the beginning of May, Robson reached three quarterfinals on the ITF Circuit. Robson won the biggest title of her career at a 60k Kurume Cup, defeating fellow Briton Katie Boulter, in straight sets. The tournament win moved her up 80 places in the ranking, causing her to reach the top 200 for the first time since 2014.

At the beginning of her grass-court season, Robson played the 100k event in Surbiton, but lost in the first round to Marina Erakovic. She then played at Nottingham, but fell to Julia Boserup in the first round. She reached the second round of the Ilkley 100k event before falling to Maryna Zanevska in three sets. She received a wildcard for Wimbledon, but lost in the first round to Brazil's Beatriz Haddad Maia.

She continued to struggle with form throughout the latter half of the season post-Wimbledon, losing eleven matches and winning just seven on the ITF Circuit, including a loss in the first round of the qualifying draw at the US Open to world No. 311, Alla Kudryavtseva.

=== 2018: Hip surgery ===
Robson was unable to play in the Australian Open qualifying draw as her ranking – at 230 – remained too low to gain direct entry. She did, however, play in the first round of the women's doubles draw with CoCo Vandeweghe, which they lost in straight sets. The following week, she lost in the first round of the Burnie International to world No. 415, Jennifer Elie, but won the doubles title partnering Vania King.

In March, Robson teamed up with Fanny Stollár to win the doubles at the ITF event in Yokohama. In July 2018, she underwent hip surgery.

=== 2019–2022: Return, further hip problems and retirement ===
After eight months recovering from surgery, Robson returned to tennis on 12 February at the 60k event in Shrewsbury, losing to Kathinka von Deichmann, in three sets. Robson's world ranking at this point was 511. She then entered the Bolton 25k qualifying tournament in April, and reached round two before falling to Tara Moore, in straight sets. The following week, Robson entered the 25k Sunderland qualifying and beat Ellie Tsimbilakis, in straight sets, and Alicia Barnett in the match tiebreaker to qualify for the main draw. This was her first main-draw appearance after her comeback. She won her first-round match in a tight three-setter but eventually fell to fellow Brit and top seed Harriet Dart, after having to retire before the second set. However, this injury was not considered serious, and Robson stated she planned to play some tournaments in about two weeks time.

In spite of this, Robson was not to play again for the rest of the year and announced in December that she had decided to have another operation on her hip.

After missing the entire 2020 and 2021 seasons following continuous injuries and multiple hip surgeries, Robson announced her retirement from the sport shortly before the 2022 French Open.

== Playing style ==
Robson played left-handed, with a two-handed backhand. One of her strengths was her "dominant" serve. She had a strong game from the back of the court and was also noted for having an aggressive forehand return. However, she has been criticised for having "poor lateral movement", as well as an inconsistent second serve, resulting in a considerable number of double faults. She has been praised for showing "extraordinary poise", and having "the attitude and technique required of a leading player". Commentator Simon Reed said that she "has every tool she needs", and former Grand Slam champion Pat Cash called her "a special talent" who "seems to have all the attributes to progress". Former WTA player Ana Ivanovic said that Robson "hits the ball really, really hard", former top British player Samantha Smith said that "she doesn't have any weaknesses at all", and Serena Williams stated that Robson is an "all-around good player". Robson's favourite surface to play on was grass and her favourite shot was her forehand down the line.

== Career statistics ==
=== Olympic Games final ===
==== Mixed doubles: 1 (silver medal) ====
Result	Year	Location	Surface	Partner	Opponents	Score
Silver	2012	London	Grass	(United Kingdom) Andy Murray	(Belarus) Victoria Azarenka (Belarus) Max Mirnyi	6–2, 3–6, [8–10]

=== Grand Slam tournament performance timelines ===
Key
W	F	SF	QF	#R	RR	Q#	DNQ	A	NH

(W) winner; (F) finalist; (SF) semifinalist; (QF) quarterfinalist; (#R) rounds 4, 3, 2, 1; (RR) round-robin stage; (Q#) qualification round; (DNQ) did not qualify; (A) absent; (NH) not held; (SR) strike rate (events won / competed); (W–L) win–loss record.
To avoid confusion and double counting, these charts are updated at the conclusion of a tournament or when the player's participation has ended.

==== Singles ====
Tournament	2009	2010	2011	2012	2013	2014	2015	2016	2017	2018	2019	W–L	Win %
Australian Open	A	Q2	A	1R	3R	1R	A	A	Q1	A	A	2–3	40%
French Open	A	A	A	1R	1R	A	A	1R	A	A	A	0–3	0%
Wimbledon	1R	1R	2R	1R	4R	A	1R	1R	1R	A	A	4–8	33%
US Open	Q3	Q3	2R	4R	3R	A	1R	1R	Q1	A	A	6–5	55%
Win–loss	0–1	0–1	2–2	3–4	7–4	0–1	0–2	0–3	0–1	0–0	0–0	12–19	38%

=== Junior Grand Slam finals ===
==== Singles (1–2) ====
Result	No.	Date	Tournament	Surface	Opponent	Score
Win	1	3 July 2008	Wimbledon	Grass	(Thailand) Noppawan Lertcheewakarn	6–3, 3–6, 6–1
Loss	1	31 January 2009	Australian Open	Hard	(Russia) Ksenia Pervak	3–6, 1–6
Loss	2	30 January 2010	Australian Open	Hard	(Czech Republic) Karolína Plíšková	1–6, 6–7^{(5–7)}

Preceded by Heather Watson	British tennis number one 17 September 2012 – 14 October 2012; 8 April 2013 – 8 June 2014	Succeeded by Heather Watson
Awards
Preceded by (Romania) Irina-Camelia Begu	WTA Newcomer of the Year; 2012	Succeeded by (Canada) Eugenie Bouchard
