= Yang Zi (tennis) =

Chinese tennis player

Yang Zi 杨子
- Country (sports): China
- Residence: Shenzhen, China
- Born: 12 September 1993 (age 31); Shenzhen, China
- Plays: Right-handed (two-handed backhand)
- Prize money: $42,305

Singles
- Career record: 107–107
- Highest ranking: No. 303 (23 September 2013)

Doubles
- Career record: 35–57
- Highest ranking: No. 546 (27 May 2013)

Yang Zi (杨子; born 12 September 1993 in Shenzhen) is a Chinese former tennis player.

Yang reached a career-high singles ranking of 303, achieved on 23 September 2013. Her career-high doubles ranking of 546, she set on 27 May 2013. She reached a total of six finals in tournaments of the ITF Women's Circuit but she could not win one title.

Yang made her WTA Tour debut at the 2011 Guangzhou International Women's Open, in the doubles event partnering Pang Yang, losing in the first round.

== ITF Circuit finals ==
Legend
$25,000 tournaments
$10,000 tournaments

=== Singles (0–4) ===
Outcome	No.	Date	Tournament	Surface	Opponent	Score
Runner-up	1.	10 October 2010	Jakarta, Indonesia	Hard	(Indonesia) Sandy Gumulya	2–7, 2–6
Runner-up	2.	6 May 2012	Jakarta, Indonesia	Hard	(China) Wang Yafan	1–6, 3–6
Runner-up	3.	29 September 2012	Gulbarga, India	Hard	(India) Prerna Bhambri	2–6, 2–6
Runner-up	4.	19 May 2013	Balikpapan, Indonesia	Hard	(Serbia) Jovana Jakšić	3–6, 2–6

=== Doubles (0–2) ===
Outcome	No.	Date	Tournament	Surface	Partner	Opponents	Score
Runner-up	1.	30 April 2011	Bangkok, Thailand	Hard	(Thailand) Napatsakorn Sankaew	(China) Li Ting (Japan) Ai Yamamoto	6–7^{(6–8)}, 4–6
Runner-up	2.	23 March 2013	Kōfu, Japan	Hard	(South Korea) Han Na-lae	(Japan) Akari Inoue (Japan) Hiroko Kuwata	6–3, 5–7, [7–10]
