= Matman Township =

Matman
- Township
- Matman Township in the Wa SAD
- Coordinates: 21°57′0″N 98°52′0″E
- Country: Myanmar
- State: Shan State
- Self-Administered Division: Wa
- Districts of Myanmar: Matman District
- Capital: Matman
- Elevation: 4,196 ft (1,279 m)
- Time zone: UTC+6:30 (MMT)

Matman Township, also known as Metman Township, is a township of the Wa Self-Administered Division of Shan State, formerly and conterminously part of Matman District. The capital of the township is Matman.

== History ==
Historically most of the area had been the mountainous and wooded northwestern end of Kengtung State. Prior to 2011 the Township was carved out from parts of Hopang District and Kengtung District.
