= Chanelle Scheepers =

South African tennis player

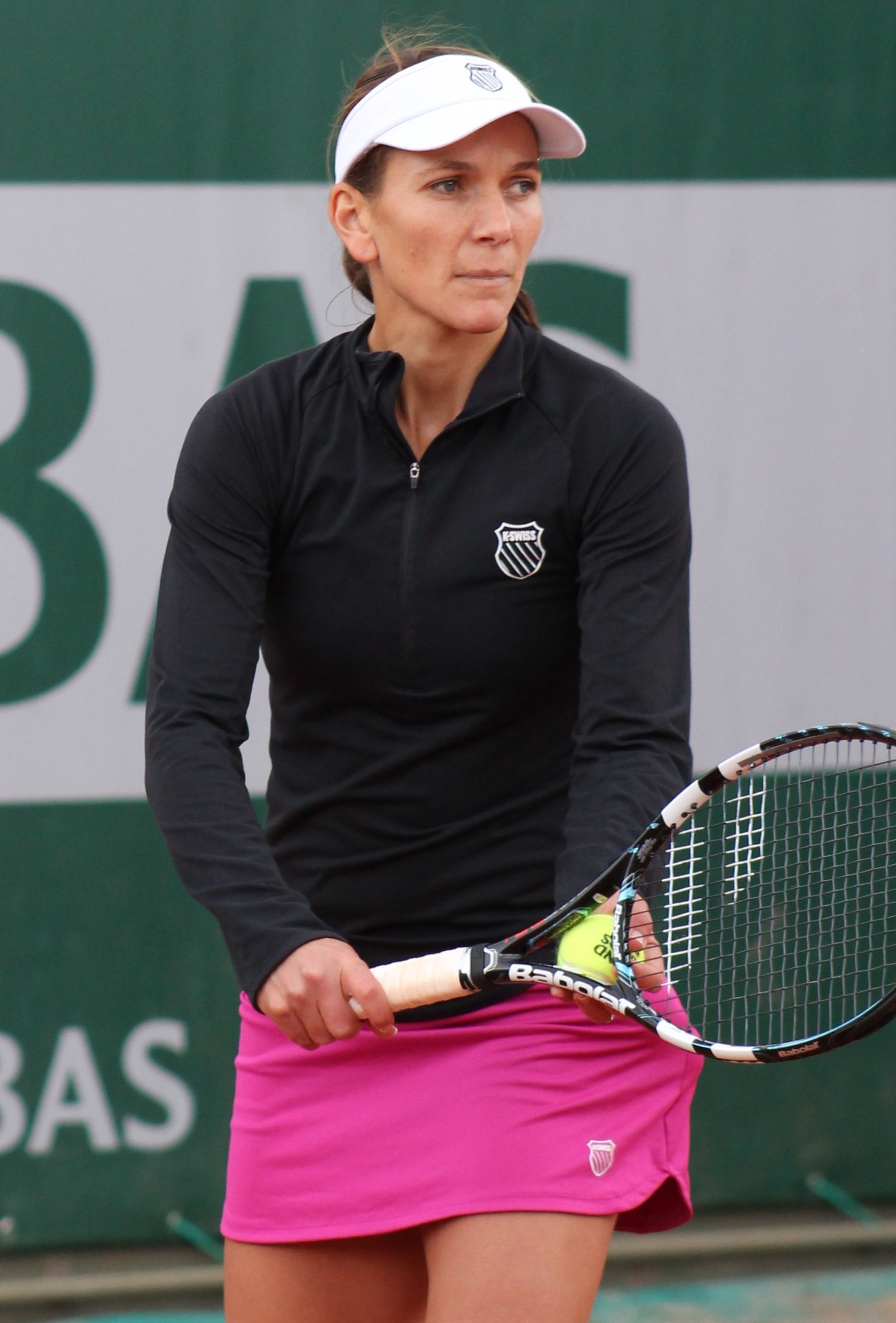
- Scheepers at the 2013 French Open
- Country (sports): South Africa
- Residence: Boca Raton, Florida, U.S.
- Born: 13 March 1984 (age 42) Harrismith, South Africa
- Height: 1.74 m (5 ft 8 1/2 in)
- Turned pro: 2000
- Retired: April 2015
- Plays: Right-handed (two-handed backhand)
- Prize money: US$1,949,415

Singles
- Career record: 436–346
- Career titles: 1
- Highest ranking: No. 37 (10 October 2011)

Grand Slam singles results
- Australian Open: 3R (2011)
- French Open: 4R (2010)
- Wimbledon: 2R (2014)
- US Open: 3R (2011)

Doubles
- Career record: 240–186
- Career titles: 1
- Highest ranking: No. 42 (10 April 2014)

Grand Slam doubles results
- Australian Open: 2R (2013, 2015)
- French Open: 1R (2011)
- Wimbledon: SF (2013)
- US Open: 2R (2012)

Chanelle Scheepers (/ʃəˈnɛl ˈskɛpərz/ shə-NEL SKEP-ərz; born 13 March 1984) is a retired South African tennis player.

She won one singles and one doubles title on the WTA Tour, as well as 12 singles and 20 doubles titles on the ITF Women's Circuit in her career. On 10 October 2011, she reached her best singles ranking of world No. 37. On 10 April 2014, she peaked at No. 42 in the doubles rankings.

== Career ==
Scheepers turned professional in 2000 and played two ITF events. In 2001, she reached four finals at ITF level and won all, with three of them coming from Durban, South Africa a local tournament, and one in the United States.

In 2002, she reached three ITF finals winning one in Mackay, Australia and losing in the other two in Liechtenstein and Switzerland.

In 2003, she played her first tour-level event in the Australian Hard Court Championships and won her first main-draw tour-level match after getting through the qualifying draw over Samantha Stosur but lost to Tathiana Garbin in the next round. She then had a 19 match losing streak in the qualifying draws of tour-level and ITF events and main-draw of ITF events.

Scheepers won four ITF titles in 2004; two in Benin City, Nigeria and two in Pretoria, South Africa. She also reached four other finals in Torre del Greco and Taranto both in Italy, in Pétange, Luxembourg and Lagos, Nigeria.

In 2005, Scheepers once again started playing in the qualifying draw of tour-level events, but she did not produce results, as she only reached one semifinals and one quarterfinals in ITF events.

2006 was not a better year for Scheepers, despite returning to the ITF circuit, as she only reached two semifinals and one quarterfinal.

In 2007, Scheepers won her first ITF titles in three years, as she won two titles in Lagos, Nigeria and Allentown, Pennsylvania, United States.

In 2008, her form went down as she only reached one semifinal and two quarterfinals. Scheepers has a breakthrough year in 2009, as she made her Grand Slam main-draw debut getting through the qualifying draw in the Australian Open and French Open. She also had four main-draw wins and won a title in Irapuato, Mexico.

In 2010, Scheepers continued to play in the tour-level events, and her persistence paid off as she reached her first main-draw quarterfinal in the Malaysian Open, losing to Japanese player Ayumi Morita. She then won in the ITF event of Fort Walton Beach, United States. At the French Open, after coming through the qualifying draw, she won her first Grand Slam main-draw match over Frenchwoman Mathilde Johansson in straight sets. She then continued her form by upsetting both, Gisela Dulko and Akgul Amanmuradova. She lost to world No. 5, Elena Dementieva in the fourth round in straight sets. As a result of this performance, she was awarded a wildcard into the main-draw of Wimbledon, where she lost in the first round to ninth seed and eventual quarter-finalist Li Na.

In 2011, she made the third round of the Australian Open. Following modest results for much of the rest of the year, Scheepers reached the third round of the US Open, where she held match points against Francesca Schiavone, before losing the match in three sets. Following that, she won her first WTA single titles at the Guangzhou International Women's Open as seventh seed, defeating eighth seed Magdaléna Rybáriková in the final. Scheepers achieved her career-high singles ranking of world No. 37 following the tournament.

In July 2012, she reached the second round of Mercury Insurance Open in Carlsbad, California, USA, losing to Varvara Lepchenko.

At the 2013 Wimbledon Championships, she teamed with Shuko Aoyama and reached the semifinals in women's doubles. Scheepers was runner-up at the 2014 Swedish Open, losing to Mona Barthel in the final.

She retired from professional tennis in August 2015, and later started coaching American tennis player Alison Riske.

== Personal life ==
Scheepers married Roger Anderson, her former coach, on 10 November 2012, in the KwaZulu-Natal Midlands.

== Performance timelines ==
Key
W	F	SF	QF	#R	RR	Q#	P#	DNQ	A	Z#	PO	G	S	B	NMS	NTI	P	NH

(W) winner; (F) finalist; (SF) semifinalist; (QF) quarterfinalist; (#R) rounds 4, 3, 2, 1; (RR) round-robin stage; (Q#) qualification round; (P#) preliminary round; (DNQ) did not qualify; (A) absent; (Z#) Davis/Fed Cup Zonal Group (with number indication) or (PO) play-off; (G) gold, (S) silver or (B) bronze Olympic/Paralympic medal; (NMS) not a Masters tournament; (NTI) not a Tier I tournament; (P) postponed; (NH) not held; (SR) strike rate (events won / competed); (W–L) win–loss record.
To avoid confusion and double counting, these charts are updated at the conclusion of a tournament or when the player's participation has ended.

Only main-draw results in WTA Tour, Grand Slam tournaments, Fed Cup and Olympic Games are included in win–loss records.

=== Singles ===
Tournament	2002	2003	2004	2005	2006	2007	2008	2009	2010	2011	2012	2013	2014	2015	SR	W–L	Win%
Grand Slam
Australian Open	A	Q2	A	Q1	A	A	A	1R	Q1	3R	1R	1R	1R	1R	0 / 6	2–6	25%
French Open	A	Q1	A	Q1	A	A	Q2	1R	4R	2R	2R	1R	1R	A	0 / 6	5–6	45%
Wimbledon	A	Q1	A	Q1	A	A	Q2	Q1	1R	1R	1R	1R	2R	A	0 / 5	1–5	17%
US Open	A	Q1	A	Q2	A	Q1	Q2	Q3	1R	3R	1R	2R	1R	A	0 / 5	3–5	38%
Win–loss	0–0	0–0	0–0	0–0	0–0	0–0	0–0	0–2	3–3	5–4	1–4	1–4	1–4	0–1	0 / 22	11–22	33%
WTA Premier Mandatory & 5 + former
Dubai / Qatar Open (Note: The first Premier 5 event of the year has switched back and forth between the Dubai Tennis Championships and the Qatar Total Open since 2009. Dubai was classified as a Premier 5 event from 2009 to 2011 before being succeeded by Doha for the 2012–2014 period. In 2015, Dubai regained its Premier 5 status while Doha was demoted to Premier status. The Premier 5 tournaments were reclassified as WTA 1000 tournaments in 2021.)	A	A	A	A	A	A	A	A	Q1	2R	1R	A	A	A	0 / 2	1–2	33%
Indian Wells Open	A	A	A	A	A	A	A	A	Q1	Q1	3R	2R	1R	1R	0 / 4	3–4	43%
Miami Open	A	A	A	A	A	A	A	A	A	2R	3R	1R	2R	Q2	0 / 4	4–4	50%
Berlin / Madrid Open (Note: In 2009, the Berlin Open was replaced by the Madrid Open. The Premier Mandatory tournaments were reclassified as WTA 1000 tournaments in 2021.)	A	A	A	A	A	A	A	A	A	2R	1R	2R	Q1	A	0 / 3	2–3	40%
Italian Open	A	A	A	A	A	A	A	A	Q2	1R	3R	Q1	1R	A	0 / 3	2–3	40%
Canadian Open	A	A	A	A	A	A	1R	A	Q1	Q1	3R	1R	A	A	0 / 3	2–3	40%
Cincinnati Open	A	A	A	A	A	A	A	A	Q2	2R	2R	Q2	1R	A	0 / 3	2–3	40%
Pan Pacific / Wuhan Open (Note: In 2014, the Toray Pan Pacific Open was downgraded to a Premier event and replaced by the Wuhan Open. The Premier 5 tournaments were reclassified as WTA 1000 tournaments in 2021.)	A	A	A	A	A	A	A	Q1	Q1	A	1R	Q2	Q1	A	0 / 1	0–1	0%
China Open	A	A	A	A	A	A	A	Q2	Q1	2R	1R	1R	Q1	A	0 / 3	1–3	25%
Charleston Open (former)	A	A	A	A	A	A	1R	A	A	A	A	A	A	A	0 / 1	0–1	0%
Win–loss	0–0	0–0	0–0	0–0	0–0	0–0	0–2	0–0	0–0	5–6	9–9	2–5	1–4	0–1	0 / 27	17–27	39%
Career statistics
Tournament	2002	2003	2004	2005	2006	2007	2008	2009	2010	2011	2012	2013	2014	2015	SR	W–L	Win%
Tournament	0 (Note: During the season, she did not play in the main-draw of any WTA Tour-level tournaments. However, she played at the Fed Cup that is not counted as a played tournament but matches counted.)	1	0	0	0	0	2	8	9	20	26	21	17	5	Career total: 109		
Titles	0	0	0	0	0	0	0	0	0	1	0	0	0	0	Career total: 1		
Finals	0	0	0	0	0	0	0	0	0	1	0	0	1	0	Career total: 2		
Hard win–loss	3–0	1–2	0–0	0–0	0–0	0–0	0–1	3–6	4–6	16–11	17–17	5–13	3–8	4–3	1 / 67	56–67	46%
Clay win–loss	0–0	3–1	0–2	2–2	0–0	0–0	0–1	0–1	3–2	4–6	5–6	10–7	11–8	1–2	0 / 33	39–38	51%
Grass win–loss	0–0	0–0	0–0	0–0	0–0	0–0	0–0	1–1	0–1	0–2	1–2	0–1	1–1	0–0	0 / 8	3–8	27%
Carpet win–loss	0–0	0–0	0–0	0–0	0–0	0–0	0–0	0–0	0–0	0–0	1–1	0–0	0–0	0–0	0 / 1	1–1	50%
Overall win–loss	3–0	4–3	0–2	2–2	0–0	0–0	0–2	4–8	7–9	20–19	24–26	15–21	15–17	5–5	1 / 109	99–114	46%
Year-end ranking	226	245	210	234	328	222	172	130	107	38	60	80	77	423	$1,949,415		

=== Doubles ===
Tournament	2002	2003	2004	2005	2006	2007	2008	2009	2010	2011	2012	2013	2014	2015	SR	W–L	Win%
Grand Slam
Australian Open	A	A	A	A	A	A	A	A	A	A	1R	2R	1R	2R	0 / 4	2–4	33%
French Open	A	A	A	A	A	A	A	A	A	1R	A	1R	1R	A	0 / 3	0–3	0%
Wimbledon	A	A	A	A	A	A	A	A	3R	2R	2R	SF	2R	A	0 / 5	9–5	64%
US Open	A	A	A	A	A	A	A	A	1R	1R	2R	1R	1R	A	0 / 5	1–5	17%
Win–loss	0–0	0–0	0–0	0–0	0–0	0–0	0–0	0–0	2–2	1–3	2–3	5–4	0–2	1–1	0 / 17	12–17	41%
WTA Premier Mandatory & 5 + former
Dubai / Qatar Open	NMS						A	A	A	A	1R	A	A	A	0 / 1	0–1	0%
Indian Wells Open	A	A	A	A	A	A	A	A	A	A	A	A	1R	A	0 / 1	0–1	0%
Miami Open	A	A	A	A	A	A	A	A	A	A	A	A	1R	A	0 / 1	0–1	0%
Berlin / Madrid Open	A	A	A	A	A	A	A	A	A	A	A	A	2R	A	0 / 1	0–1	0%
Italian Open	A	A	A	A	A	A	A	A	1R	1R	A	A	1R	A	0 / 3	0–3	0%
Canadian Open	A	A	A	A	A	A	1R	A	A	A	A	1R	A	A	0 / 2	0–2	0%
Cincinnati Open	NMS							A	A	A	A	1R	A	A	0 / 1	0–1	0%
Pan Pacific / Wuhan Open	A	A	A	A	A	A	A	A	A	A	A	A	A	A	0 / 0	0–0	–
China Open	NMS							A	1R	A	A	1R	1R	A	0 / 3	0–3	0%
Charleston Open (former)	A	A	A	A	A	A	2R	NMS							0 / 1	1–1	50%
Win–loss	0–0	0–0	0–0	0–0	0–0	0–0	1–2	0–0	0–2	0–1	0–1	0–3	0–5	0–0	0 / 14	1–14	7%
Career statistics
Tournament	1	0	0	1	0	2	4	6	10	8	8	15	13	1	Career total: 69		
Titles	0	0	0	0	0	0	0	0	0	0	0	1	0	0	Career total: 1		
Finals	0	0	0	0	0	0	0	1	0	0	1	1	2	0	Career total: 5		
Overall win–loss	1–2	1–0	1–0	1–1	0–0	0–2	3–4	6–6	5–9	4–7	5–8	13–14	7–13	1–2	1 / 69	47–68	41%
Year-end ranking	266	312	225	267	150	199	135	142	116	211	143	55	104	371			

== WTA career finals ==
=== Singles: 2 (1 title, 1 runner-up) ===
Legend
Grand Slam
WTA Premier Mandatory & 5
WTA Premier
WTA International (1–1)

Result	W–L	Date	Tournament	Tier	Surface	Opponent	Score
Win	1–0	Sep 2011	Guangzhou Open, China	International	Hard	(Slovakia) Magdaléna Rybáriková	6–2, 6–2
Loss	1–1	Jul 2014	Swedish Open	International	Clay	(Germany) Mona Barthel	3–6, 6–7^{(3–7)}

=== Doubles: 5 (1 title, 4 runner-ups) ===
Legend
Grand Slam
WTA Premier Mandatory & 5
WTA Premier
WTA International (1–4)

Result	W–L	Date	Tournament	Tier	Surface	Partner	Opponents	Score
Loss	0–1	Oct 2009	Japan Open	International	Hard	(United States) Abigail Spears	(United States) Lisa Raymond (Chinese Taipei) Chuang Chia-jung	2–6, 4–6
Loss	0–2	Aug 2012	Citi Open, United States	International	Hard	(United States) Irina Falconi	(Japan) Shuko Aoyama (Chinese Taipei) Chang Kai-chen	5–7, 2–6
Win	1–2	May 2013	Internationaux de Strasbourg, France	International	Clay	(Japan) Kimiko Date-Krumm	(Zimbabwe) Cara Black (New Zealand) Marina Erakovic	6–4, 3–4, [14–12]
Loss	1–3	Feb 2014	Rio Open, Brazil	International	Clay	(Sweden) Johanna Larsson	(Romania) Irina-Camelia Begu (Argentina) María Irigoyen	2–6, 0–6
Loss	1–4	Apr 2014	Copa Colsanitas, Colombia	International	Clay	(United States) Vania King	(Spain) Lara Arruabarrena (France) Caroline Garcia	6–7^{(5–7)}, 4–6

== ITF Circuit finals ==
Legend
$100,000 tournaments
$75,000 tournaments
$50,000 tournaments
$25,000 tournaments
$10,000 tournaments

=== Singles: 19 (12 titles, 7 runner-ups) ===
Result	W–L	Date	Tournament	Tier	Surface	Opponent	Score
Win	1–0	May 2001	ITF Durban, South Africa	10,000	Hard	(South Africa) Lara Van Looyen	7–5, 6–2
Win	2–0	Jun 2001	ITF Durban, South Africa	10,000	Hard	(South Africa) Lara Van Looyen	4–6, 6–3, 7–6^{(7–3)}
Win	3–0	Jul 2001	ITF Evansville, United States	10,000	Hard	(United States) Kristen Schlukebir	6–1, 6–3
Loss	3–1	Jun 2002	ITF Vaduz, Liechtenstein	25,000	Clay	(Switzerland) Myriam Casanova	1–6, 3–6
Loss	3–2	Jun 2002	ITF Lenzerheide, Switzerland	25,000	Clay	(Czech Republic) Eva Birnerová	5–7, 4–6
Win	4–2	Oct 2002	ITF Mackay, Australia	25,000	Hard	(Australia) Amanda Grahame	7–6^{(8–6)}, 7–5
Win	5–2	Feb 2004	ITF Benin City, Nigeria	10,000	Hard	(India) Meghha Vakaria	6–1, 6–3
Win	6–2	Feb 2004	ITF Benin City, Nigeria	10,000	Hard	(Austria) Susanne Aigner	6–1, 4–6, 6–4
Loss	6–3	Apr 2004	ITF Torre del Greco, Italy	10,000	Clay	(Finland) Emma Laine	6–3, 4–6, 0–6
Loss	6–4	Jun 2004	ITF Pétange, Luxembourg	25,000	Clay	(Slovakia) Stanislava Hrozenská	7–6^{(14–12)}, 1–6, 4–6
Loss	6–5	Oct 2004	ITF Lagos, Nigeria	25,000	Hard	(India) Sania Mirza	6–4, 6–7, 5–7
Win	7–5	Nov 2004	ITF Pretoria, South Africa	10,000	Hard	(South Africa) Lizaan du Plessis	6–1, 6–3
Win	8–5	Nov 2004	ITF Pretoria, South Africa	10,000	Hard	(Norway) Karoline Borgersen	6–1, 6–3
Loss	8–6	Jun 2007	ITF Hilton Head, United States	10,000	Hard	(United States) Angela Haynes	6–3, 2–6, 4–6
Win	9–6	Jun 2007	ITF Allentown, United States	25,000	Hard	(United States) Angela Haynes	6–2, 2–6, 6–1
Win	10–6	Dec 2007	ITF Lagos, Nigeria	25,000	Hard	(Slovakia) Zuzana Kučová	6–2, 6–0
Loss	10–7	Jan 2009	ITF Laguna Niguel, United States	25,000	Hard	(United States) Alexa Glatch	1–6, 0–6
Win	11–7	Mar 2009	ITF Irapuato, Mexico	25,000	Hard	(Russia) Natalia Rizhonkova	6–1, 7–5
Win	12–7	Mar 2010	ITF Fort Walton Beach, United States	25,000	Hard	(Australia) Sophie Ferguson	7–5, 7–5

=== Doubles: 36 (20 titles, 16 runner-ups) ===
Result	W–L	Date	Tournament	Tier	Surface	Partner	Opponents	Score
Loss	0–1	Jun 2000	ITF Pretoria, South Africa	10,000	Hard	(South Africa) Carien Venter	(South Africa) Natalie Grandin (South Africa) Nicole Rencken	6–7^{(4–7)}, 2–6
Win	1–1	Jun 2001	ITF Durban, South Africa	10,000	Hard	(South Africa) Lara Van Rooyen	(South Africa) Maretha van Niekerk (South Africa) Karin Vermeulen	7–6^{(7–2)}, 6–0
Win	2–1	Jun 2001	ITF Durban, South Africa	10,000	Hard	(South Africa) Lara Van Rooyen	(Brazil) Marcela Evangelista (Brazil) Letícia Sobral	6–2, 6–2
Win	3–1	Jun 2001	ITF Algiers, Algeria	10,000	Clay	(South Africa) Karin Vermeulen	(Moldova) Evghenia Ablovatchi (Slovakia) Lenka Tvarošková	7–6^{(7–2)}, 6–4
Win	4–1	Jul 2001	ITF Algiers, Algeria	10,000	Clay	(South Africa) Karin Vermeulen	(Germany) Isabel Collischonn (Germany) Marnie Mahler	7–5, 6–2
Loss	4–2	Nov 2002	ITF Mount Gambier, Australia	25,000	Hard	(United Kingdom) Jane O'Donoghue	(Australia) Daniella Dominikovic (Australia) Evie Dominikovic	walkover
Win	5–2	Mar 2003	ITF Rabat, Morocco	10,000	Clay	(Austria) Daniela Klemenschits	(Sweden) Helena Ejeson (Sweden) Helena Norfeldt	6–3, 6–2
Loss	5–3	Feb 2004	ITF Benin City, Nigeria	10,000	Hard	(Austria) Jennifer Schmidt	(Czech Republic) Zuzana Černá (Germany) Franziska Etzel	0–6, 7–5, 3–6
Win	6–3	Mar 2004	ITF Benin City, Nigeria	10,000	Hard	(Jamaica) Alanna Broderick	(Czech Republic) Zuzana Černá (Germany) Franziska Etzel	6–2, 6–2
Win	7–3	Apr 2004	ITF Torre del Greco, Italy	10,000	Clay	(Netherlands) Jolanda Mens	(Netherlands) Michelle Gerards (Netherlands) Marielle Hoogland	6–3, 6–0
Loss	7–4	Oct 2004	ITF Lagos, Nigeria	25,000	Hard	(South Africa) Surina De Beer	(New Zealand) Shelley Stephens (India) Sania Mirza	1–6, 4–6
Win	8–4	Oct 2004	ITF Lagos, Nigeria	25,000	Hard	(South Africa) Surina De Beer	(New Zealand) Shelley Stephens (India) Sania Mirza	6–0, 6–0
Win	9–4	Dec 2004	ITF Pretoria, South Africa	10,000	Hard	(United Kingdom) Melissa Berry	(Norway) Karoline Borgersen (Netherlands) Leonie Mekel	6–2, 3–6, 7–5
Win	10–4	Jan 2006	ITF Tampa, United States	25,000	Hard	(United States) Aleke Tsoubanos	(Chinese Taipei) Chan Chin-Wei (Chinese Taipei) Hsu Wen-hsin	3–6, 7–6^{(7–4)}, 6–3
Loss	10–5	Jan 2006	ITF Fort Walton Beach, United States	25,000	Hard	(Slovakia) Zuzana Kučová	(Canada) Maureen Drake (Czech Republic) Vladimíra Uhlířová	6–2, 4–6, 5–7
Loss	10–6	Mar 2006	ITF Clearwater, United States	25,000	Hard	(South Africa) Natalie Grandin	(Republic of Ireland) Kelly Liggan (Lithuania) Lina Stančiūtė	3–6, 1–6
Loss	10–7	Apr 2006	ITF Pelham, United States	25,000	Clay	(United States) Tiffany Dabek	(United States) Tetiana Luzhanska (Indonesia) Romana Tedjakusuma	4–6, 1–6
Win	11–7	May 2006	ITF Grado, Italy	25,000	Clay	(United States) Tiffany Dabek	(France) Mailyne Andrieux (Croatia) Nika Ožegović	6–4, 4–6, 7–6
Win	12–7	Jun 2006	ITF Gorizia, Italy	25,000	Clay	(Argentina) Soledad Esperón	(Spain) Matilde Muñoz Gonzalves (Spain) Sílvia Soler Espinosa	6–4, 6–3
Loss	12–8	Oct 2006	ITF Troy, United States	50,000	Hard	(United States) Neha Uberoi	(Australia) Nicole Kriz (New Zealand) Leanne Baker	7–6^{(7–1)}, 5–7, 3–6
Loss	12–9	Oct 2006	ITF Augusta, United States	25,000	Hard	(United States) Neha Uberoi	(Australia) Nicole Kriz (New Zealand) Leanne Baker	6–7^{(3–7)}, 1–6
Loss	12–10	Oct 2006	ITF Mexico City, Mexico	25,000	Hard	(Brazil) Maria Fernanda Alves	(Argentina) María José Argeri (Brazil) Letícia Sobral	3–6, 5–7
Win	13–10	Mar 2007	ITF Toluca, Mexico	10,000	Hard	(United States) Courtney Nagle	(Argentina) María Irigoyen (Argentina) Andrea Benítez	6–2, 1–6, 6–2
Loss	13–11	Mar 2007	ITF Mérida, Mexico	10,000	Hard	(United States) Robin Stephenson	(Brazil) Maria Fernanda Alves (Argentina) Vanina García Sokol	3–6, 2–6
Win	14–11	Mar 2007	ITF Coatzacoalcos, Mexico	25,000	Hard	(United States) Robin Stephenson	(Latvia) Līga Dekmeijere (United States) Story Tweedie-Yates	6–2, 6–2
Loss	14–12	Apr 2007	ITF Sea Island, United States	50,000	Clay	(Romania) Anda Perianu	(United States) Raquel Kops-Jones (United States) Lilia Osterloh	5–7, 3–6
Win	15–12	Oct 2007	ITF Saltillo, Mexico	25,000	Hard	(Argentina) Soledad Esperón	(Belgium) Debbrich Feys (Netherlands) Leonie Mekel	6–0, 6–4
Win	16–12	Oct 2007	ITF San Luis Potosí, Mexico	25,000	Hard	(Belgium) Debbrich Feys	(Uruguay) Estefanía Craciún (Argentina) Betina Jozami	6–1, 6–4
Win	17–12	Dec 2007	ITF Lagos, Nigeria	25,000	Hard	(South Africa) Kelly Anderson	(France) Iryna Brémond (Romania) Ágnes Szatmári	0–6, 6–3, [10–8]
Win	18–12	Dec 2007	ITF Lagos, Nigeria	25,000	Hard	(South Africa) Kelly Anderson	(France) Iryna Brémond (Romania) Ágnes Szatmári	1–6, 6–3, [10–6]
Loss	18–13	Mar 2008	ITF Noida, India	25,000	Hard	(South Africa) Kelly Anderson	(Serbia) Teodora Mirčić (Slovakia) Lenka Tvarošková	2–6, 7–6 ^{(9–7)}, [6–10]
Loss	18–14	May 2008	ITF Saint-Gaudens, France	50,000	Clay	(France) Aurélie Védy	(Chinese Taipei) Hsieh Su-wei (Canada) Marie-Ève Pelletier	4–6, 0–6
Loss	18–15	Mar 2009	ITF Irapuato, Mexico	25,000	Hard	(Argentina) Soledad Esperón	(Argentina) Jorgelina Cravero (Argentina) Veronica Spiegel	1–6, 0–6
Win	19–15	May 2009	ITF Saint-Gaudens, France	50,000	Clay	(Japan) Rika Fujiwara	(Japan) Kimiko Date-Krumm (China) Sun Tiantian	7–5, 6–4
Win	20–15	Mar 2010	ITF Fort Walton Beach, United States	25,000	Hard	(Sweden) Johanna Larsson	(United States) Christina Fusano (United States) Courtney Nagle	2–6, 7–6, [10–7]
Loss	20–16	Nov 2010	ITF Grapevine, United States	50,000	Hard	(United States) Julie Ditty	(United States) Ahsha Rolle (United States) Mashona Washington	7–5, 2–6, 2–6
