= 2007 Guangzhou International Women's Open – Singles =

Singles
- 2007 Guangzhou International Women's Open

Final
- Champion: (France) Virginie Razzano
- Runner-up: (Israel) Tzipora Obziler
- Score: 6–3, 6–0

Details
- Draw: 32
- Seeds: 8

Events
Singles	Doubles
← 2006 ·	Guangzhou International Women's Open	· 2008 →

Anna Chakvetadze was the defending champion, but chose not to participate that year.

Virginie Razzano won her first WTA tour title, defeating Tzipora Obziler in the final 6–3, 6–0.

== Seeds ==
1. (Spain) Anabel Medina Garrigues (quarterfinals)
2. (France) Virginie Razzano (champion)
3. (China) Peng Shuai (second round)
4. (Slovakia) Dominika Cibulková (semifinals)
5. (Russia) Olga Puchkova (first round)
6. (Belarus) Olga Govortsova (second round)
7. (Spain) Lourdes Domínguez Lino (first round)
8. (Russia) Alla Kudryavtseva (first round)

== Draw ==
=== Key ===
- Q = Qualifier
- WC = Wild card
- LL = Lucky loser
- Alt = Alternate
- SE = Special exempt
- PR = Protected ranking
- ITF = ITF entry
- JE = Junior exempt
- w/o = Walkover
- r = Retired
- d = Defaulted
- SR = Special ranking

=== Finals ===
Semifinals
(Russia) Anastasia Rodionova	1	1^{r}
(Israel) Tzipora Obziler	6	3
4	(Slovakia) Dominika Cibulková	6	1	1
2	(France) Virginie Razzano	3	6	6

Final
(Israel) Tzipora Obziler	0	3
2	(France) Virginie Razzano	6	6

=== Top half ===
First round
1	(Spain) A Medina Garrigues	7	6
WC	(China) S Sun	6^{5}	1
(China) S Zhang	2	4
(Croatia) J Kostanić Tošić	6	6
(Canada) A Wozniak	4	2
(Russia) A Rodionova	6	6
(France) C Pin	6	4
8	(Russia) A Kudryavtseva	1	1^{r}
3	(China) S Peng	6	7
(Argentina) ME Salerni	3	6^{5}
(Israel) T Obziler	6	6
Q	(Netherlands) E Tamaëla	1	3
(United States) V King	4	6^{5}
WC	(China) Z Yan	6	7
(Romania) IR Olaru	6	6
7	(Spain) L Domínguez Lino	2	4

Second round
1	(Spain) A Medina Garrigues	6	6
(Croatia) J Kostanić Tošić	2	2
(Russia) A Rodionova	3	6	6
(France) C Pin	6	3	4
3	(China) S Peng	6	4	6^{5}
(Israel) T Obziler	4	6	7
WC	(China) Z Yan	1	4
(Romania) IR Olaru	6	6

Quarterfinals
1	(Spain) A Medina Garrigues	7	5	3
(Russia) A Rodionova	6^{5}	7	6
(Israel) T Obziler	2	6	7
(Romania) IR Olaru	6	1	5

Semifinals
(Russia) A Rodionova	1	1^{r}
(Israel) T Obziler	6	3

=== Bottom half ===
First round
5	(Russia) O Puchkova	4	6	4
Q	(United States) J Ditty	6	2	6
(Czech Republic) H Šromová	5	2
(Australia) A Molik	7	6
Q	(China) S Song	6	6
WC	(China) C Ji	3	2
(Belarus) T Poutchek	0	3
4	(Slovakia) D Cibulková	6	6
6	(Belarus) O Govortsova	6	6
(Slovakia) J Gajdošová	1	3
(Spain) V Ruano Pascual	6	6
(Ukraine) K Antoniychuk	1	0
Q	(United States) R Kops-Jones	6	6^{5}	5
(China) T Sun	3	7	7
(United States) J Craybas	3	6	1
2	(France) V Razzano	6	1	6

Second round
Q	(United States) J Ditty	3	2
(Australia) A Molik	6	6
Q	(China) S Song	1	2
4	(Slovakia) D Cibulková	6	6
6	(Belarus) O Govortsova	2	1
(Spain) V Ruano Pascual	6	6
(China) T Sun	0	0
2	(France) V Razzano	6	6

Quarterfinals
(Australia) A Molik	7	1	4
4	(Slovakia) D Cibulková	6^{7}	6	6
(Spain) V Ruano Pascual	3	1
2	(France) V Razzano	6	6

Semifinals
4	(Slovakia) D Cibulková	6	1	1
2	(France) V Razzano	3	6	6
