= 2009 Guangzhou International Women's Open =

- Date: September 14–20
- Edition: 6th
- Category: WTA International
- Surface: Hard / outdoor
- Location: Guangzhou, China

Champions

Singles
- (Israel) Shahar Pe'er

Doubles
- (Belarus) Olga Govortsova / (Belarus) Tatiana Poutchek
← 2008 ·	Guangzhou International Women's Open	· 2010 →

The 2009 Guangzhou International Women's Open (also known as the TOE Life Ceramics Guangzhou International Women's Open for sponsorship reasons) was a women's tennis tournament on outdoor hard courts. It was the 6th edition of the Guangzhou International Women's Open, and was part of the WTA International tournaments of the 2009 WTA Tour. It was held in Guangzhou, China, from September 14 through September 20, 2009.

== Finals ==
=== Singles ===
(Israel) Shahar Pe'er defeated (Italy) Alberta Brianti 6–3, 6–4

- It was Pe'er first title in over 3 years, and her 4th title overall.
- It was Brianti's first final appearance at the WTA Tour.

=== Doubles ===
(Belarus) Olga Govortsova / (Belarus) Tatiana Poutchek defeated (Japan) Kimiko Date-Krumm / (China) Sun Tiantian 3–6, 6–2, [10–8]

== Entrants ==
=== Seeds ===
Country	Player	Rank^{1}	Seed
ESP	Anabel Medina Garrigues	21	1
CHN	Zheng Jie	22	2
CHN	Peng Shuai	44	3
SLO	Katarina Srebotnik	56	4
ISR	Shahar Pe'er	64	5
BLR	Olga Govortsova	65	6
JPN	Ayumi Morita	69	7
ITA	Alberta Brianti	85	8
ITA	Maria Elena Camerin	86	9

- ^{1} Seeds are based on the rankings of August 31, 2009
- Jie Zheng was forced to withdraw due to a left wrist injury, so Maria Elena Camerin became the no. 9 seed.

=== Other entrants ===
The following players received wildcards into the singles main draw

- (China) Lu Jingjing
- (China) Yan Zi
- (China) Han Xinyun

The following players received entry from the qualifying draw:

- (China) Chen Yanchong
- (Hong Kong) Zhang Ling
- (Chinese Taipei) Chang Kai-Chen
- (Belarus) Tatiana Poutchek

The following players received lucky loser spot in the Main Draw:

- (United States) Abigail Spears
