= 2009 Guangzhou International Women's Open – Doubles =

Doubles
- 2009 Guangzhou International Women's Open

Final
- Champion: (Belarus) Olga Govortsova (Belarus) Tatiana Poutchek
- Runner-up: (Japan) Kimiko Date-Krumm (China) Sun Tiantian
- Score: 3–6, 6–2, [10–8]

Details
- Draw: 16
- Seeds: 4

Events
Singles	Doubles
← 2008 ·	Guangzhou International Women's Open	· 2010 →

Mariya Koryttseva and Tatiana Poutchek were the defending champions, but Koryttseva chose not to participate that year.
Poutchek partnered with Olga Govortsova, and they won in the final 3–6, 6–2, [10–8], against Kimiko Date-Krumm and Sun Tiantian.

== Seeds ==
1. (Spain) Anabel Medina Garrigues / (Spain) Arantxa Parra Santonja (first round)
2. (Chinese Taipei) Yung-jan Chan / (Slovenia) Katarina Srebotnik (first round)
3. (China) Peng Shuai / (China) Xu Yifan (quarterfinals)
4. (Uzbekistan) Akgul Amanmuradova / (Japan) Ayumi Morita (first round)

== Draw ==
=== Key ===
- Q = Qualifier
- WC = Wild card
- LL = Lucky loser
- Alt = Alternate
- ITF = ITF entry
- PR = Protected ranking
- SR = Special ranking
- SE = Special exempt
- JE = Junior exempt
- JR = Junior Accelerator Programme entrant
- CO = College Accelerator Programme entrant
- NG = Next Gen Accelerator Program entrant
- w/o = Walkover
- r = Retired
- d = Defaulted

First round
1	(Spain) A Medina Garrigues (Spain) A Parra Santonja	1	6	[10]
(Italy) A Brianti (Italy) ME Camerin	6	3	[12]
(Ukraine) O Savchuk (Germany) K Wörle	6^{4}	6	[12]
(United States) A Haynes (United States) A Rolle	7	4	[10]
4	(Uzbekistan) A Amanmuradova (Japan) A Morita	3	1
(Chinese Taipei) C-W Chan (Japan) R Fujiwara	6	6
(Chinese Taipei) K-C Chang (Chinese Taipei) Y Chen	2	4
(Japan) K Date-Krumm (China) T Sun	6	6
(Kyrgyzstan) K Palkina (China) S Zhang	1	3
(Belarus) O Govortsova (Belarus) T Poutchek	6	6
WC	(China) C Liang (China) Y-M Zhou	6^{4}	1
3	(China) S Peng (China) Y-F Xu	7	6
(South Africa) C Scheepers (United States) A Spears	6	6
(China) X Han (China) C-M Ji	2	3
(China) J Lu (China) S Sun	6	2	[10]
2	(Chinese Taipei) Y-J Chan (Slovenia) K Srebotnik	4	6	[3]

Quarterfinals
(Italy) A Brianti (Italy) ME Camerin	7	1	[6]
(Ukraine) O Savchuk (Germany) K Wörle	5	6	[10]
(Chinese Taipei) C-W Chan (Japan) R Fujiwara	2	2
(Japan) K Date-Krumm (China) T Sun	6	6
(Belarus) O Govortsova (Belarus) T Poutchek	6	6
3	(China) S Peng (China) Y-F Xu	2	2
(South Africa) C Scheepers (United States) A Spears	6	3	[10]
(China) J Lu (China) S Sun	2	6	[4]

Semifinals
(Ukraine) O Savchuk (Germany) K Wörle	3	2
(Japan) K Date-Krumm (China) T Sun	6	6
(Belarus) O Govortsova (Belarus) T Poutchek	6	6
(South Africa) C Scheepers (United States) A Spears	4	4

Finals
(Japan) K Date-Krumm (China) T Sun	6	2	[8]
(Belarus) O Govortsova (Belarus) T Poutchek	3	6	[10]
