= 2010 Guangzhou International Women's Open =

- Date: September 13–19
- Edition: 7th
- Category: WTA International
- Draw: 32S / 16D
- Prize money: $220,000
- Surface: Hard / outdoor
- Location: Guangzhou, China

Champions

Singles
- (Australia) Jarmila Groth

Doubles
- (Romania) Edina Gallovits / (India) Sania Mirza
← 2009 ·	Guangzhou International Women's Open	· 2011 →

The 2010 Guangzhou International Women's Open (also known as the Landsky Lighting Guangzhou International Women's Open for sponsorship reasons) was a women's tennis tournament on outdoor hard courts. It was the seventh edition of the Guangzhou International Women's Open, and part of the WTA International tournaments of the 2010 WTA Tour. It took place in Guangzhou, China, from September 13 through September 19, 2010. first-seeded Jarmila Groth won the singles title.

== Finals ==
=== Singles ===
(Australia) Jarmila Groth defeated (Russia) Alla Kudryavtseva 6–1, 6–4

- It was Jarmila's first title on the WTA Tour.

=== Doubles ===
(Romania) Edina Gallovits / (India) Sania Mirza defeated (China) Han Xinyun / (China) Liu Wanting, 7–5, 6–3

== WTA entrants ==
=== Seeds ===
Country	Player	Rank^{1}	Seed
AUS	Jarmila Groth	60	1
TPE	Chan Yung-jan	77	2
UZB	Akgul Amanmuradova	78	3
JPN	Ayumi Morita	83	4
TPE	Chang Kai-chen	84	5
SRB	Bojana Jovanovski	87	6
ITA	Alberta Brianti	89	7
RSA	Chanelle Scheepers	92	8

- ^{1} Seeds are based on the rankings of August 30, 2010.

=== Other entrants ===
The following players received wildcards into the singles main draw:

- (China) Han Xinyun
- (China) Lu Jing-jing
- (China) Xu Yifan

The following players received entry from the qualifying draw:

- (Chinese Taipei) Hsieh Su-wei
- (South Korea) Kim So-jung
- (Japan) Junri Namigata
- (China) Sun Shengnan
