= 2007 Guangzhou International Women's Open – Doubles =

Doubles
- 2007 Guangzhou International Women's Open

Final
- Champions: (China) Peng Shuai (China) Yan Zi
- Runners-up: (United States) Vania King (China) Sun Tiantian
- Score: 6–3, 6–4

Events
Singles	Doubles
← 2006 ·	Guangzhou International Women's Open	· 2008 →

The doubles Tournament at the 2007 Guangzhou International Women's Open took place between 24 and 30 September on outdoor hard courts in Guangzhou, China. Peng Shuai and Yan Zi won the title, defeating Vania King and Sun Tiantian in the final.

== Seeds ==
1. (United States) Vania King / (China) Sun Tiantian (final)
2. (Spain) Anabel Medina Garrigues / (Spain) Virginia Ruano Pascual (semifinals)
3. (China) Peng Shuai / (China) Yan Zi (champions)
4. (United States) Jill Craybas / (Croatia) Jelena Kostanić Tošić (semifinals)

== Draw ==
=== Key ===
- Q = Qualifier
- WC = Wild card
- LL = Lucky loser
- Alt = Alternate
- SE = Special exempt
- PR = Protected ranking
- ITF = ITF entry
- JE = Junior exempt
- w/o = Walkover
- r = Retired
- d = Defaulted
- SR = Special ranking

First round
1	(United States) V King (China) T Sun	6	7
(Spain) L Domínguez Lino (Argentina) ME Salerni	3	6^{1}
Alt	(China) W Liu (China) J Lu	4	6	[10]
(China) L Huang (Russia) M Kondratieva	6	2	[6]
4	(United States) J Craybas (Croatia) J Kostanić Tošić	6	2
(France) C Pin (Turkey) İ Şenoğlu	1	0^{r}
WC	(China) X Han (China) Y Xu	6	6
(South Africa) N Grandin (Romania) A Perianu	3	4
(United States) J Ditty (United States) R Kops-Jones	4	6^{0}
(Belarus) T Poutchek (Russia) A Rodionova	6	7
(China) C Ji (China) S Sun	2	0
3	(China) S Peng (China) Z Yan	6	6
(Netherlands) K Kilsdonk (France) S Lefèvre	7	5	[10]
Alt	(China) Y Chen (China) S Song	6^{2}	7	[7]
(Czech Republic) H Šromová (Netherlands) E Tamaëla	2	6^{3}
2	(Spain) A Medina Garrigues (Spain) V Ruano Pascual	6	7

Quarterfinals
1	(United States) V King (China) T Sun	3	6	[10]
Alt	(China) W Liu (China) J Lu	6	1	[6]
4	(United States) J Craybas (Croatia) J Kostanić Tošić	6	6
WC	(China) X Han (China) Y Xu	4	2
(Belarus) T Poutchek (Russia) A Rodionova	1	4
3	(China) S Peng (China) Z Yan	6	6
(Netherlands) K Kilsdonk (France) S Lefèvre	2	1
2	(Spain) A Medina Garrigues (Spain) V Ruano Pascual	6	6

Semifinals
1	(United States) V King (China) T Sun	7	6
4	(United States) J Craybas (Croatia) J Kostanić Tošić	6^{8}	2
3	(China) S Peng (China) Z Yan	6	6
2	(Spain) A Medina Garrigues (Spain) V Ruano Pascual	2	1

Final
1	(United States) V King (China) T Sun	3	4
3	(China) S Peng (China) Z Yan	6	6
