= 2010 Guangzhou International Women's Open – Doubles =

Doubles
- 2010 Guangzhou International Women's Open

Final
- Champion: (Romania) Edina Gallovits (India) Sania Mirza
- Runner-up: (China) Han Xinyun (China) Liu Wan-ting
- Score: 7–5, 6–3

Events
Singles	Doubles
- Guangzhou International Women's Open

Olga Govortsova and Tatiana Poutchek were the defending champions, but they chose to not compete this year.

Edina Gallovits and Sania Mirza won this tournament. They defeated Han Xinyun and Liu Wan-ting 7–5, 6–3 in the final.

== Seeds ==
1. (Uzbekistan) Akgul Amanmuradova / (Russia) Alla Kudryavtseva (quarterfinals)
2. (South Africa) Natalie Grandin / (Czech Republic) Vladimíra Uhlířová (first round)
3. (Chinese Taipei) Hsieh Su-wei / (South Africa) Chanelle Scheepers (quarterfinals)
4. (United Kingdom) Anna Smith / (China) Yan Zi (quarterfinals)

== Draw ==
Key

- Q = Qualifier
- WC = Wild card
- LL = Lucky loser
- Alt = Alternate
- ITF = ITF entry
- PR = Protected ranking
- SR = Special ranking
- SE = Special exempt
- JE = Junior exempt
- JR = Junior Accelerator Programme entrant
- CO = College Accelerator Programme entrant
- NG = Next Gen Accelerator Program entrant
- w/o = Walkover
- r = Retired
- d = Defaulted

First round
1	(Uzbekistan) A Amanmuradova (Russia) A Kudryavtseva	6	6
(Russia) A Panova (Russia) K Pervak	4	1
WC	(Chinese Taipei) Y Chen (China) S Liu	6	4	[9]
(Ukraine) O Savchuk (Thailand) T Tanasugarn	3	6	[11]
4	(United Kingdom) A Smith (China) Z Yan	6	6^{3}	[10]
(China) S Sun (China) S Zhang	3	7	[5]
(Australia) J Groth (Australia) S Peers	4	3
(Romania) E Gallovits (India) S Mirza	6	6
(China) J-j Lu (China) Y-F Xu	2	6	[10]
(Chinese Taipei) C-w Chan (Kyrgyzstan) K Palkina	6	2	[8]
(Russia) N Bratchikova (Russia) E Ivanova	3	3
3	(Chinese Taipei) S-w Hsieh (South Africa) C Scheepers	6	6
(Italy) A Brianti (Chinese Taipei) K-c Chang	6	6
WC	(China) C Liang (China) Y-M Zhou	4	1
(China) X Han (China) W-t Liu	6	6
2	(South Africa) N Grandin (Czech Republic) V Uhlířová	3	4

Quarterfinals
1	(Uzbekistan) A Amanmuradova (Russia) A Kudryavtseva	3	3
(Ukraine) O Savchuk (Thailand) T Tanasugarn	6	6
4	(United Kingdom) A Smith (China) Z Yan	2	4
(Romania) E Gallovits (India) S Mirza	6	6
(China) J-j Lu (China) Y-F Xu	6	6
3	(Chinese Taipei) S-w Hsieh (South Africa) C Scheepers	4	2
(Italy) A Brianti (Chinese Taipei) K-c Chang	1	5
(China) X Han (China) W-t Liu	6	7

Semifinals
(Ukraine) O Savchuk (Thailand) T Tanasugarn	3	0
(Romania) E Gallovits (India) S Mirza	6	6
(China) J-j Lu (China) Y-F Xu	3	3
(China) X Han (China) W-t Liu	6	6

Finals
(Romania) E Gallovits (India) S Mirza	7	6
(China) X Han (China) W-t Liu	5	3
