= 2007 Guangzhou International Women's Open =

- Date: September 24 – September 30
- Edition: 4th

Champions

Singles
- (France) Virginie Razzano

Doubles
- (China) Peng Shuai / (China) Yan Zi
← 2006 ·	Guangzhou International Women's Open	· 2008 →

The 2007 Guangzhou International Women's Open was a tennis tournament played on outdoor hard courts. It was the 4th edition of the Guangzhou International Women's Open, and was a Tier III event on the 2007 Sony Ericsson WTA Tour. It was held in Guangzhou, People's Republic of China, from September 24 through September 30, 2009. Total prize money for the tournament was $175,000.

== WTA entrants ==
=== Seeds ===
==== Singles ====
Country	Player	Rank^{1}	Seed
ESP	Anabel Medina Garrigues	31	1
FRA	Virginie Razzano	40	2
CHN	Peng Shuai	49	3
SVK	Dominika Cibulková	57	4
RUS	Olga Puchkova	59	5
BLR	Olga Govortsova	60	6
ESP	Lourdes Domínguez Lino	65	7
RUS	Alla Kudryavtseva	67	8

- ^{1} Seeds are based on the rankings of September 17, 2007.

==== Doubles ====
Countries	Team	Rank^{1}	Seed
USA / CHN	Vania King & Sun Tiantian	46	1
ESP / ESP	Anabel Medina Garrigues & Virginia Ruano Pascual	47	2
CHN / CHN	Peng Shuai & Yan Zi	52	3
USA / CRO	Jill Craybas & Jelena Kostanić Tošić	57	4

- ^{1} Seeds are based on the rankings of September 17, 2007.

=== Other entrants ===
The following players received wildcards into the singles main draw

- (China) Sun Shengnan
- (China) Yan Zi
- (China) Ji Chunmei

The following players received entry from the singles qualifying draw:

- (Netherlands) Elise Tamaëla
- (United States) Julie Ditty
- (China) Song Shanshan
- (United States) Raquel Kops-Jones

== Champions ==
=== Singles ===
(France) Virginie Razzano def. (Israel) Tzipora Obziler, 6–3, 6–0

- Razzano won the first WTA title of her career, while Obziler reached her first WTA final at the age of 34 years.

=== Doubles ===
(China) Peng Shuai / (China) Yan Zi def. (United States) Vania King / (China) Sun Tiantian, 6–3, 6–4

== Prize money and points breakdown ==
=== Singles ===
Round	Money	Points
Winner	$25,855	140
Finalist	$13,845	100
Semifinalist	$7,300	65
Quarterfinalist	$3,910	35
2nd round	$2,105	20
1st round	$1,240	1

=== Doubles ===
Round	Money	Points
Winner	$7,260	140
Finalist	$4,050	100
Semifinalist	$2,140	65
Quarterfinalist	$1,160	35
1st round	$630	1
