= 2009 Guangzhou International Women's Open – Singles =

Singles
- 2009 Guangzhou International Women's Open

Final
- Champion: (Israel) Shahar Pe'er
- Runner-up: (Italy) Alberta Brianti
- Score: 6–3, 6–4

Details
- Draw: 32
- Seeds: 8

Events
Singles	Doubles
← 2008 ·	Guangzhou International Women's Open	· 2010 →

Vera Zvonareva was the 2009 defending champion, but chose not to participate that year.

Shahar Pe'er won the title, defeating Alberta Brianti in the final 6–3, 6–4.

== Seeds ==
1. (Spain) Anabel Medina Garrigues (second round)
2. (China) Zheng Jie (withdrew due to left wrist injury)
3. (China) Peng Shuai (semifinals, retired)
4. (Slovenia) Katarina Srebotnik (first round)
5. (Israel) Shahar Pe'er (champion)
6. (Belarus) Olga Govortsova (second round)
7. (Japan) Ayumi Morita (semifinals)
8. (Italy) Alberta Brianti (finals)
9. (Italy) Maria Elena Camerin (second round)

== Draw ==
=== Key ===
- Q = Qualifier
- WC = Wild card
- LL = Lucky loser
- Alt = Alternate
- ITF = ITF entry
- PR = Protected ranking
- SR = Special ranking
- SE = Special exempt
- JE = Junior exempt
- JR = Junior Accelerator Programme entrant
- CO = College Accelerator Programme entrant
- NG = Next Gen Accelerator Program entrant
- w/o = Walkover
- r = Retired
- d = Defaulted

=== Finals ===
Semifinals
8	(Italy) Alberta Brianti	6	7
7	(Japan) Ayumi Morita	3	5
3	(China) Peng Shuai	4	0^{r}
5	(Israel) Shahar Pe'er	6	1

Final
8	(Italy) Alberta Brianti	3	4
5	(Israel) Shahar Pe'er	6	6

=== Top half ===
First round
1	(Spain) A Medina Garrigues	6	4	6
(Japan) K Date-Krumm	1	6	4
WC	(China) J Lu	4	2
(Latvia) A Sevastova	6	6
(Slovakia) L Wienerová	7	4	6
Q	(Hong Kong) L Zhang	6^{5}	6	4
(Australia) S Ferguson	6^{1}	4
8	(Italy) A Brianti	7	6
4	(Slovenia) K Srebotnik	6	5	2
(Ukraine) O Savchuk	3	7	6
(Chinese Taipei) S-W Hsieh	6	7
WC	(China) Z Yan	3	5
LL	(United States) A Spears	6	7
Q	(Chinese Taipei) K-C Chang	3	6^{3}
Q	(Belarus) T Poutchek	3	3
7	(Japan) A Morita	6	6

Second round
1	(Spain) A Medina Garrigues	6	3	1
(Latvia) A Sevastova	3	6	6
(Slovakia) L Wienerová	3	1
8	(Italy) A Brianti	6	6
(Ukraine) O Savchuk	6	6
(Chinese Taipei) S-W Hsieh	4	4
LL	(United States) A Spears	6	1	0
7	(Japan) A Morita	1	6	6

Quarterfinals
(Latvia) A Sevastova	4	2
8	(Italy) A Brianti	6	6
(Ukraine) O Savchuk	3	4
7	(Japan) A Morita	6	6

Semifinals
8	(Italy) A Brianti	6	7
7	(Japan) A Morita	3	5

=== Bottom half ===
First round
6	(Belarus) O Govortsova	3	6	7
WC	(China) X Han	6	4	5
(Japan) Y Sema	2	6	6^{7}
(Russia) A Panova	6	3	7
(South Africa) C Scheepers	7	5	6
(Spain) A Parra Santonja	6^{12}	7	3
(United States) A Haynes	2	5
3	(China) S Peng	6	7
5	(Israel) S Pe'er	6	6
(Germany) K Wörle	1	4
(Japan) R Fujiwara	3	2
(Uzbekistan) A Amanmuradova	6	6
(France) M Johansson	1	1
(Chinese Taipei) Y-J Chan	6	6
Q	(China) Y Chen	2	2
9	(Italy) ME Camerin	6	6

Second round
6	(Belarus) O Govortsova	5	4
(Russia) A Panova	7	6
(South Africa) C Scheepers	3	2
3	(China) S Peng	6	6
5	(Israel) S Pe'er	6	6
(Uzbekistan) A Amanmuradova	3	3
(Chinese Taipei) Y-J Chan	6	3	7
9	(Italy) ME Camerin	3	6	6^{2}

Quarterfinals
(Russia) A Panova	2	3
3	(China) S Peng	6	6
5	(Israel) S Pe'er	6	6
(Chinese Taipei) Y-J Chan	3	1

Semifinals
3	(China) S Peng	4	0^{r}
5	(Israel) S Pe'er	6	1
