= 2008 Guangzhou International Women's Open – Singles =

Singles
- 2008 Guangzhou International Women's Open

Final
- Champion: (Russia) Vera Zvonareva
- Runner-up: (China) Peng Shuai
- Score: 6–7^{(4–7)}, 6–0, 6–2

Details
- Draw: 32
- Seeds: 8

Events
Singles	Doubles
← 2007 ·	Guangzhou International Women's Open	· 2009 →

Virginie Razzano was the defending champion, but chose not to participate that year.

Vera Zvonareva won the title, defeating Peng Shuai in the final 6–7^{(4–7)}, 6–0, 6–2.

== Seeds ==
1. (Russia) Vera Zvonareva (champion)
2. (Switzerland) Patty Schnyder (withdrew due to a back injury)
3. (China) Zheng Jie (semifinals)
4. (China) Peng Shuai (final)
5. (Argentina) Gisela Dulko (second round)
6. (Belarus) Olga Govortsova (second round)
7. (France) Pauline Parmentier (second round)
8. (Ukraine) Mariya Koryttseva (second round)
9. (Poland) Marta Domachowska (withdrew due to a viral illness)

== Draw ==
=== Key ===
- Q = Qualifier
- WC = Wild card
- LL = Lucky loser
- Alt = Alternate
- SE = Special exempt
- PR = Protected ranking
- ITF = ITF entry
- JE = Junior exempt
- w/o = Walkover
- r = Retired
- d = Defaulted
- SR = Special ranking

=== Finals ===
Semifinals
1	(Russia) Vera Zvonareva	6	7
3	(China) Zheng Jie	3	5
4	(China) Peng Shuai	6	6
(France) Camille Pin	2	1

Final
1	(Russia) Vera Zvonareva	6^{4}	6	6
4	(China) Peng Shuai	7	0	2

=== Top half ===
First round
1	(Russia) V Zvonareva	6	6
(Russia) A Rodionova	1	2
(Canada) S Dubois	3	1
LL	(China) Y-f Xu	6	6
(Italy) K Knapp	7	1	6
WC	(China) S Zhang	6^{6}	6	1
(Uzbekistan) A Amanmuradova	4	4
8	(Ukraine) M Koryttseva	6	6
3	(China) J Zheng	6	6
WC	(China) T Sun	0	1
(Hungary) A Kapros	7	4	1
(Romania) IR Olaru	6^{5}	6	6
(Austria) T Paszek	6	6
Q	(South Korea) Y-r Lee	0	4
LL	(China) X Han	1	5
7	(France) P Parmentier	6	7

Second round
1	(Russia) V Zvonareva	6	7
LL	(China) Y-f Xu	1	6^{4}
(Italy) K Knapp	6	6
8	(Ukraine) M Koryttseva	4	4
3	(China) J Zheng	6	6
(Romania) IR Olaru	4	0
(Austria) T Paszek	6	2	6
7	(France) P Parmentier	2	6	3

Quarterfinals
1	(Russia) V Zvonareva	6	6
(Italy) K Knapp	1	0
3	(China) J Zheng	6	6
(Austria) T Paszek	2	1

Semifinals
1	(Russia) V Zvonareva	6	7
3	(China) J Zheng	3	5

=== Bottom half ===
First round
6	(Belarus) O Govortsova	6	6
(China) Z Yan	3	2
Q	(Russia) A Pivovarova	2	4
(United States) J Craybas	6	6
(Belarus) E Dzehalevich	6^{4}	2
WC	(China) J Lu	7	6
(Italy) M Santangelo	4	2
4	(China) S Peng	6	6
5	(Argentina) G Dulko	7	3	6
Q	(Belarus) T Poutchek	6^{3}	6	4
(Belgium) Y Wickmayer	7	2	4
Q	(Netherlands) A Rus	6^{2}	6	6
(Russia) A Pavlyuchenkova	4	6	3
(Russia) A Kudryavtseva	6	4	6
(France) C Pin	6	6
LL	(China) Y Chen	2	3

Second round
6	(Belarus) O Govortsova	2	5
(United States) J Craybas	6	7
WC	(China) J Lu	3	4
4	(China) S Peng	6	6
5	(Argentina) G Dulko	4	4
Q	(Netherlands) A Rus	6	6
(Russia) A Kudryavtseva	6	0	2
(France) C Pin	2	6	6

Quarterfinals
(United States) J Craybas	4	1
4	(China) S Peng	6	6
Q	(Netherlands) A Rus	3	3
(France) C Pin	6	6

Semifinals
4	(China) S Peng	6	6
(France) C Pin	2	1
