= 2008 Guangzhou International Women's Open – Doubles =

Doubles
- 2008 Guangzhou International Women's Open

Final
- Champions: (Ukraine) Mariya Koryttseva (Belarus) Tatiana Poutchek
- Runners-up: (China) Sun Tiantian (China) Yan Zi
- Score: 6–3, 4–6, [10–8]

Details
- Draw: 16
- Seeds: 4

Events
Singles	Doubles
← 2007 ·	Guangzhou International Women's Open	· 2009 →

Peng Shuai and Yan Zi were the defending champions. They were both present but did not compete together.
Peng partnered with Yanina Wickmayer, but lost in the first round to Mariya Koryttseva and Tatiana Poutchek.
Yan partnered with Sun Tiantian, but Mariya Koryttseva and Tatiana Poutchek defeated them 6–3, 4–6, [10–8] in the final.

== Seeds ==
1. (China) Sun Tiantian / (China) Yan Zi (final)
2. (Ukraine) Mariya Koryttseva / (Belarus) Tatiana Poutchek (champions)
3. (United States) Jill Craybas / (Belarus) Olga Govortsova (quarterfinals)
4. (Uzbekistan) Akgul Amanmuradova / (Russia) Anastasia Rodionova (semifinals, withdrew)

== Draw ==
=== Key ===
- Q = Qualifier
- WC = Wild card
- LL = Lucky loser
- Alt = Alternate
- SE = Special exempt
- PR = Protected ranking
- ITF = ITF entry
- JE = Junior exempt
- w/o = Walkover
- r = Retired
- d = Defaulted
- SR = Special ranking

=== Draw ===
First round
1	(China) T Sun (China) Z Yan	6	3	[11]
(Russia) A Kudryavtseva (Russia) A Pavlyuchenkova	4	6	[9]
(China) C Ji (China) S Zhang	6	7
WC	(China) S Qiu (China) S Shao	3	5
4	(Uzbekistan) A Amanmuradova (Russia) A Rodionova	6	6
(China) C Liang (China) Y Zhao	2	0
(Chinese Taipei) C-w Chan (Romania) IR Olaru	6	6
(France) P Parmentier (France) C Pin	2	4
(Belarus) E Dzehalevich (Russia) A Pivovarova	7	4	[10]
(Italy) M Santangelo (Turkey) İ Şenoğlu	6^{5}	6	[7]
(Poland) M Domachowska (Argentina) G Dulko
3	(United States) J Craybas (Belarus) O Govortsova	w/o
(China) X Han (China) Y-f Xu	6	7
(China) Y Chen (China) J Lu	1	6^{3}
(China) S Peng (Belgium) Y Wickmayer	6	4	[5]
2	(Ukraine) M Koryttseva (Belarus) T Poutchek	1	6	[10]

Quarterfinals
1	(China) T Sun (China) Z Yan	6	6
(China) C Ji (China) S Zhang	0	3
4	(Uzbekistan) A Amanmuradova (Russia) A Rodionova	6	6
(Chinese Taipei) C-w Chan (Romania) IR Olaru	4	3
(Belarus) E Dzehalevich (Russia) A Pivovarova	6	7
3	(United States) J Craybas (Belarus) O Govortsova	4	5
(China) X Han (China) Y-f Xu	2	4
2	(Ukraine) M Koryttseva (Belarus) T Poutchek	6	6

Semifinals
1	(China) T Sun (China) Z Yan	w/o
4	(Uzbekistan) A Amanmuradova (Russia) A Rodionova
(Belarus) E Dzehalevich (Russia) A Pivovarova	4	6	[2]
2	(Ukraine) M Koryttseva (Belarus) T Poutchek	6	4	[10]

Final
1	(China) T Sun (China) Z Yan	3	6	[8]
2	(Ukraine) M Koryttseva (Belarus) T Poutchek	6	4	[10]
