= 2006 Guangzhou International Women's Open – Singles =

Tennis event

Singles
- 2006 Guangzhou International Women's Open

Final
- Champion: (Russia) Anna Chakvetadze
- Runner-up: (Spain) Anabel Medina Garrigues
- Score: 6–1, 6–4

Details
- Draw: 32 (3WC/4Q)
- Seeds: 8

Events
Singles	Doubles
← 2005 ·	Guangzhou International Women's Open	· 2007 →

Yan Zi was the defending champion, but lost in first round to Olga Puchkova.

Anna Chakvetadze won the title, defeating Anabel Medina Garrigues in the final 6–1, 6–4.

== Seeds ==
1. (Serbia and Montenegro) Jelena Janković (semifinals, retired due to a heat illness)
2. (China) Li Na (quarterfinals)
3. (Russia) Anna Chakvetadze (champion)
4. (Spain) Anabel Medina Garrigues (final)
5. (Spain) Lourdes Domínguez Lino (second round)
6. (United States) Meghann Shaughnessy (first round)
7. (Russia) Elena Vesnina (second round)
8. (Belarus) Anastasiya Yakimova (second round)

== Draw ==
=== Key ===
- Q = Qualifier
- WC = Wild card
- LL = Lucky loser
- Alt = Alternate
- SE = Special exempt
- PR = Protected ranking
- ITF = ITF entry
- JE = Junior exempt
- w/o = Walkover
- r = Retired
- d = Defaulted
- SR = Special ranking

=== Finals ===
Semifinals
1	(Serbia and Montenegro) Jelena Janković	5	0^{r}
3	(Russia) Anna Chakvetadze	7	2
4	(Spain) Anabel Medina Garrigues	7	2	6
(Israel) Tzipora Obziler	5	6	4

Final
3	(Russia) Anna Chakvetadze	6	6
4	(Spain) Anabel Medina Garrigues	1	4

=== Top half ===
First round
1	(Serbia and Montenegro) J Janković	6	6
(China) M Yuan	0	2
(China) S Peng	6	6
(Ukraine) Y Beygelzimer	4	4
(United States) V King	7^{7}	3	5
(Australia) A Molik	6^{5}	6	7
(United Kingdom) A Keothavong	3	4
5	(Spain) L Domínguez Lino	6	6
3	(Russia) A Chakvetadze	3	7	6
WC	(China) S Zhang	6	5	0
Q	(Netherlands) E Tamaëla	6	7
Q	(China) J Hao	2	5
(Russia) O Puchkova	2	6	6
(China) Z Yan	6	3	3
(Croatia) J Kostanić	6	6
6	(United States) M Shaughnessy	4	4

Second round
1	(Serbia and Montenegro) J Janković	6	6
(China) S Peng	2	3
(Australia) A Molik	7^{7}	6
5	(Spain) L Domínguez Lino	6^{3}	1
3	(Russia) A Chakvetadze	6	6^{6}	6
Q	(Netherlands) E Tamaëla	2	7^{8}	3
(Russia) O Puchkova	6	6
(Croatia) J Kostanić	1	1

Quarterfinals
1	(Serbia and Montenegro) J Janković	6	7
(Australia) A Molik	3	5
3	(Russia) A Chakvetadze	7^{7}	3	6
(Russia) O Puchkova	6^{3}	6	1

Semifinals
1	(Serbia and Montenegro) J Janković	5	0^{r}
3	(Russia) A Chakvetadze	7	2

=== Bottom half ===
First round
8	(Belarus) A Yakimova	6	6
Q	(China) S Sun	2	1
(Hungary) M Czink	1	2
WC	(China) Y Chen	6	6
Q	(China) J Ren	6	6
(Spain) MJ Martínez Sánchez	3	4
(Russia) A Jidkova	1	3
4	(Spain) A Medina Garrigues	6	6
7	(Russia) E Vesnina	6	3	6
(Estonia) K Kanepi	1	6	1
(Israel) T Obziler	6	6
(Hungary) A Kapros	2	0
(China) T Sun	6	6
WC	(China) T Li	0	3
(Russia) G Voskoboeva	3	4
2	(China) N Li	6	6

Second round
8	(Belarus) A Yakimova	1	4
WC	(China) Y Chen	6	6
Q	(China) J Ren	0	1
4	(Spain) A Medina Garrigues	6	6
7	(Russia) E Vesnina	6	3	3
(Israel) T Obziler	4	6	6
(China) T Sun	2	1
2	(China) N Li	6	6

Quarterfinals
WC	(China) Y Chen	6	0	2
4	(Spain) A Medina Garrigues	1	6	6
(Israel) T Obziler	6	6
2	(China) N Li	3	2

Semifinals
4	(Spain) A Medina Garrigues	7	2	6
(Israel) T Obziler	5	6	4
