= 2010 Guangzhou International Women's Open – Singles =

Singles
- 2010 Guangzhou International Women's Open

Final
- Champion: (Australia) Jarmila Groth
- Runner-up: (Russia) Alla Kudryavtseva
- Score: 6–1, 6–4

Details
- Draw: 32
- Seeds: 8

Events
Singles	Doubles
- Guangzhou International Women's Open

Shahar Pe'er was the defending champion, but chose not to participate that year.

Jarmila Groth won her first WTA tour title, defeating Alla Kudryavtseva in the final 6–1, 6–4. Groth won the tournament without dropping a single set.

== Seeds ==
1. (Australia) Jarmila Groth (champion)
2. (Chinese Taipei) Chan Yung-jan (first round)
3. (Uzbekistan) Akgul Amanmuradova (second round)
4. (Japan) Ayumi Morita (second round)
5. (Chinese Taipei) Chang Kai-chen (second round)
6. (Serbia) Bojana Jovanovski (first round)
7. (Italy) Alberta Brianti (second round)
8. (South Africa) Chanelle Scheepers (second round)

== Main draw ==
Key

- Q = Qualifier
- WC = Wild card
- LL = Lucky loser
- Alt = Alternate
- ITF = ITF entry
- PR = Protected ranking
- SR = Special ranking
- SE = Special exempt
- JE = Junior exempt
- JR = Junior Accelerator Programme entrant
- CO = College Accelerator Programme entrant
- NG = Next Gen Accelerator Program entrant
- w/o = Walkover
- r = Retired
- d = Defaulted

=== Finals ===
Semifinals
1	(Australia) Jarmila Groth	6	6
(Romania) Edina Gallovits	0	1
(China) Zhang Shuai	0	4
(Russia) Alla Kudryavtseva	6	6

Final
1	(Australia) Jarmila Groth	6	6
(Russia) Alla Kudryavtseva	1	4

=== Top half ===
First round
1	(Australia) J Groth	6	6
(Russia) N Bratchikova	2	0
(Romania) S Halep	6^{4}	2
(Thailand) T Tanasugarn	7	6
(Italy) ME Camerin	3	6	7
WC	(China) J-j Lu	6	1	5
(France) P Parmentier	3	1
7	(Italy) A Brianti	6	6
4	(Japan) A Morita	6	6
Q	(Japan) J Namigata	2	2
(Romania) E Gallovits	6^{4}	6	6
Q	(South Korea) S-j Kim	7	1	3
Q	(Chinese Taipei) S-w Hsieh	6^{2}	6	1
WC	(China) X Han	7	1	6
(Japan) K Nara	1	2
5	(Chinese Taipei) K-c Chang	6	6

Second round
1	(Australia) J Groth	6	6
(Thailand) T Tanasugarn	1	4
(Italy) ME Camerin	6	3	6
7	(Italy) A Brianti	4	6	4
4	(Japan) A Morita	2	6	4
(Romania) E Gallovits	6	4	6
WC	(China) X Han	1	6	6
5	(Chinese Taipei) K-c Chang	6	2	4

Quarterfinals
1	(Australia) J Groth	6	6
(Italy) ME Camerin	0	2
(Romania) E Gallovits	3	6	6
WC	(China) X Han	6	2	4

Semifinals
1	(Australia) J Groth	6	6
(Romania) E Gallovits	0	1

=== Bottom half ===
First round
8	(South Africa) C Scheepers	6	6
WC	(China) Y-F Xu	4	0
(Australia) S Ferguson	6	6^{5}	2
(China) S Zhang	3	7	6
(India) S Mirza	6	1	6
(United Kingdom) K O'Brien	3	6	2
(Ukraine) O Savchuk	5	2
3	(Uzbekistan) A Amanmuradova	7	6
6	(Serbia) B Jovanovski	1	5
(Russia) A Kudryavtseva	6	7
(Switzerland) S Vögele	3	6^{6}
(Russia) E Ivanova	6	7
Q	(China) S Sun	6	4	2
(Russia) A Panova	1	6	6
(Russia) K Pervak	3	6	6
2	(Chinese Taipei) Y-j Chan	6	0	2

Second round
8	(South Africa) C Scheepers	1	0
(China) S Zhang	6	6
(India) S Mirza	6	6
3	(Uzbekistan) A Amanmuradova	4	3
(Russia) A Kudryavtseva	6	3	6
(Russia) E Ivanova	4	6	2
(Russia) A Panova	5	6	0
(Russia) K Pervak	7	2	6

Quarterfinals
(China) S Zhang	6	1	6
(India) S Mirza	4	6	4
(Russia) A Kudryavtseva	6	6
(Russia) K Pervak	3	1

Semifinals
(China) S Zhang	0	4
(Russia) A Kudryavtseva	6	6
