= Jarmila Wolfe =

Australian female tennis player, born in Slovakia (born 1987)

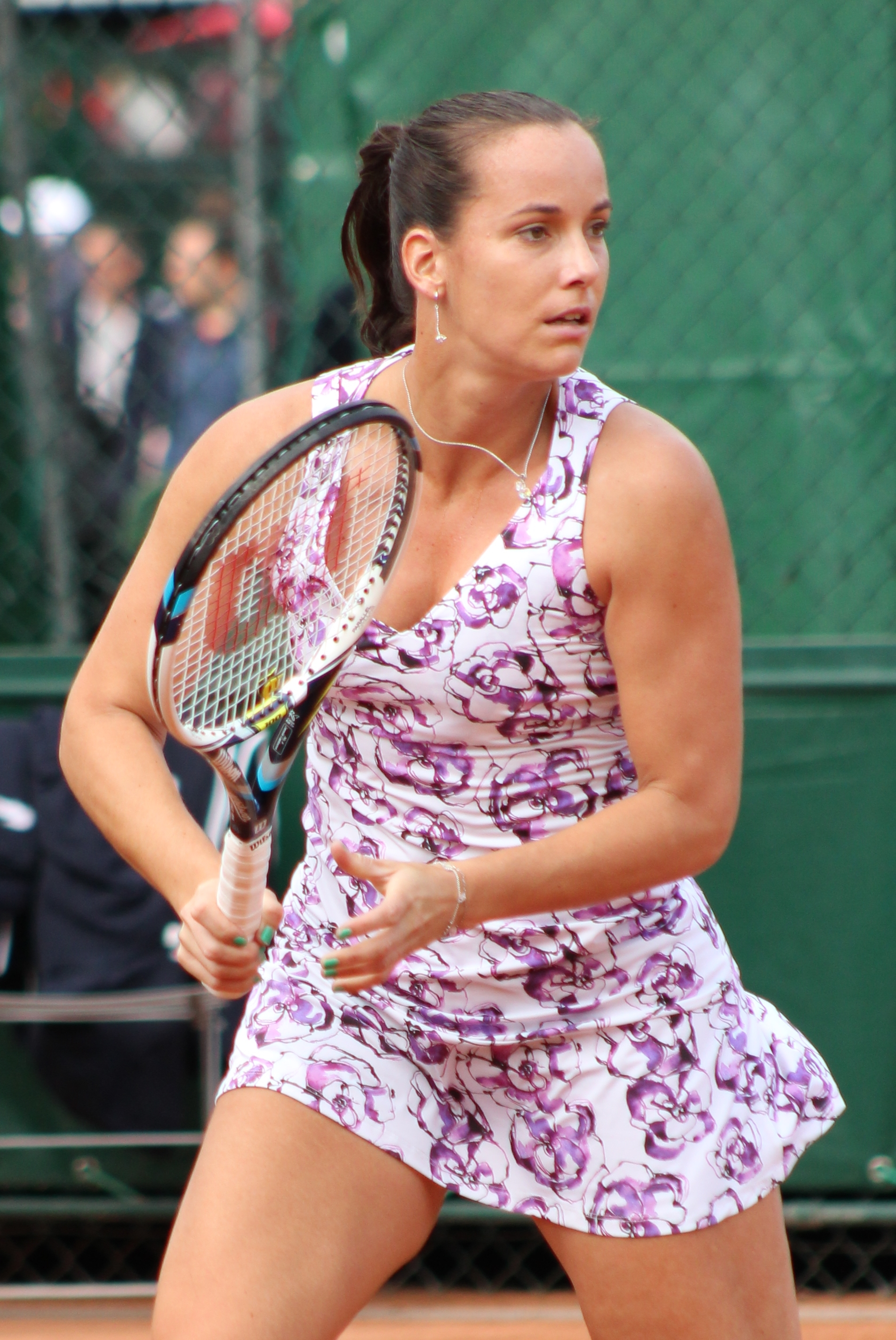
- Wolfe at the 2015 French Open
- Country (sports): Slovakia (2005–2009); Australia (2009–2017)
- Residence: Fort Lauderdale, Florida, US
- Born: 26 April 1987 (age 39) Bratislava, Czechoslovakia
- Height: 1.74 m (5 ft 9 in)
- Turned pro: May 2005
- Retired: 11 January 2017
- Plays: Right-handed (two-handed backhand)
- Prize money: $2,732,099
- Official website: Official website

Singles
- Career record: 404–276
- Career titles: 2
- Highest ranking: No. 25 (16 May 2011)

Grand Slam singles results
- Australian Open: 2R (2015)
- French Open: 4R (2010)
- Wimbledon: 4R (2010)
- US Open: 3R (2006)

Doubles
- Career record: 186–148
- Career titles: 1
- Highest ranking: No. 31 (27 August 2012)

Grand Slam doubles results
- Australian Open: QF (2014)
- French Open: QF (2012)
- Wimbledon: 3R (2006, 2015)
- US Open: 3R (2011, 2014)

Mixed doubles
- Career titles: 1

Grand Slam mixed doubles results
- Australian Open: W (2013)
- French Open: SF (2011)
- Wimbledon: 3R (2015)
- US Open: QF (2011)

Team competitions
- Fed Cup: 6–10

Jarmila Wolfe (née Gajdošová, formerly Groth; born 26 April 1987) is a Slovak-Australian former tennis player.

In her career, she won two singles titles and one doubles title on the WTA Tour, as well as 14 singles and ten doubles titles on the ITF Women's Circuit. She won her first WTA Tour title in 2006, emerging as the Nordic Light Open doubles champion, her first singles title came in 2010 at the Guangzhou International Open, and the following year she won the Hobart International. In May 2011, she reached her best singles ranking of world No. 25. In August 2012, she peaked at No. 31 in the doubles rankings. Her greatest achievement came at the 2013 Australian Open, where she won the mixed-doubles title with countryman Matthew Ebden.

== Personal life ==
Wolfe's father Ján Gajdoš is an engineer, as was her mother who died in September 2012; her older brother Ján Gajdoš Jr. was a professional skier. She married Australian tennis player Sam Groth in February 2009 and competed as Jarmila Groth from 2009 to 2011. When the couple divorced in 2011, Wolfe reverted to her birth name. Following her marriage on 1 November 2015 to Adam Wolfe, from January 2016 on she was competing as Jarmila Wolfe. In November 2017, Wolfe gave birth to their first child, Natalia Jarmila Wolfe.

== Juniors ==
Although she had already been playing in senior events for some years by the time, the highlights of her junior career came as she reached the semifinals at two junior Grand Slam tournaments. In the 2003 Wimbledon junior competition she lost in semifinal to the eventual winner Kirsten Flipkens. In the Australian Open junior competition, 2004, she reached semifinals in both singles and doubles (with Shahar Pe'er). Both times she lost to Nicole Vaidišová. Another success came in winning doubles at the Italian Open junior tournament in 2003 with Andrea Hlaváčková.

== Professional ==
=== 2001–2003 ===
Wolfe began competing as Jarmila Gajdošová on the ITF Women's Circuit just days after her 14th birthday in 2001, and that year entered three ITF tournaments, winning two matches and losing three. In 2002, she again entered only three tournaments, but this time won four matches and lost three.

Early in 2003, still aged 15, she stepped up her schedule, and that February she reached the semifinal of a $25k tournament at Redbridge, defeating Séverine Beltrame, Sandra Klösel, and Roberta Vinci before losing to Olga Barabanschikova. She won the next tournament she entered, her third of the year and only the ninth of her career. It was the $10k event at Rabat in March; and in the semifinal she defeated Ekaterina Bychkova. On the strength of this result, she found herself wildcarded into qualifying for her first WTA Tour event, a clay-court tournament at Budapest in April, and justified the wildcard by defeating all three of her opponents in the qualifying draw, including Melinda Czink, in straight sets, then Virginie Razzano in the second round of the main draw, before losing 4–6, 3–6 to Alicia Molik.

On her 16th birthday she entered qualifying for a $50k event on grass at Gifu, Japan. Again, she qualified defeating Aiko Nakamura in the qualifying round; and she reached the second round of the main draw before losing to another top Japanese player, Akiko Morigami. The next week, she came through three straight matches in qualifying at her third successive event, another Japanese $50k grass-court tournament at Fukuoka, defeating Sanda Mamić of Croatia in the qualifying round, before advancing to the quarterfinal of the main draw after a second-round victory over Zheng Jie, only to lose to Saori Obata.

At the US Open in August, she reached the final round of qualifying with upset of Anabel Medina Garrigues, but ultimately lost to Anikó Kapros of Hungary. Her season ended with two more losses in the later stages of qualifying draws at WTA events to higher ranked players. The 16-year-old Slovak ended the year ranked No. 197.

=== 2004–2005 ===
In 2004, she suffered six successive losses between August and October. Earlier in the season she scored wins over Lilia Osterloh and Tzipora Obziler in qualifying for Memphis, Akiko Morigami and Tiffany Dabek at Fukuoka, Zuzana Ondrášková in Wimbledon qualifying, and Elena Baltacha in a $50k event at Lexington, while her performance in reaching the final of the $50k event at Fukuoka was her career-best in a tournament of its class. Her year-end ranking was world No. 217.

In February 2005, she qualified for the annual WTA Tour event at Hyderabad, and beat Li Ting in the first round of the main draw, before losing to Anna-Lena Grönefeld of Germany. She did not play in March or April, but returned in May to win her first $25k event and her second career tournament on the clay of Catania, Italy beating Ivana Abramović of Croatia in the final. The following week, she reached the quarterfinal of another $50k event at Saint-Gaudens, France beating Argentine María Emilia Salerni and French player Pauline Parmentier to this end. She entered qualifying at the French Open, and defeated Shikha Uberoi but lost to Sofia Arvidsson in the second leg.

Over May and June, the 18-year-old suffered two consecutive losses in $25k tournaments to Yuan Meng. She was able to win her second $25k tournament of the year and third career title on the grass courts of Felixstowe in July, beating Katie O'Brien in the semifinal and Alla Kudryavtseva in the final. The following week, she reached the semifinals of the $50k event at Vittel, France with wins over German player Jana Kandarr and her countrywoman Sandra Klösel.

For the second successive summer, she experienced several consecutive early defeats. But in late September she defeated Alona Bondarenko, Kateryna Bondarenko, and María Emilia Salerni to qualify for the WTA Tour event at Luxembourg, in the first round of which she defeated Katarina Srebotnik in two close sets before losing to Dinara Safina. She had improved her year-end ranking to No. 147.

=== 2006: Top 100 breakthrough and WTA Tour doubles titles ===
The 18-year-old Gajdošová came through the qualifying draw to gain entry to her first Grand Slam tournament main draw at the Australian Open. She then lost a close three set first-round match to Martina Müller. But the ranking points accrued were sufficient to lift her to world No. 117 on 6 February 2006.

Staying in Australia for the rest of the month, she retreated temporarily to the ITF Circuit, winning two $25k tournaments in consecutive weeks, at Gosford and Sydney, the fourth and fifth ITF singles titles of her career. These two minor tournament victories resulted in her ranking rising to No. 106.

In mid-March, she followed up these two tournament victories by entering another $25k event at Canberra, and again came through as the victor, defeating world No. 178, Hanna Nooni, in the semifinals and Australian Monique Adamczak in the final.

The next week, she extended her winning streak to seventeen matches in reaching the quarterfinals of a $25k event in Melbourne, but then lost to Australian world No. 260 Sophie Ferguson, 1–6, 4–6. She had succeeded in breaking through into the WTA top 100 for the first time in her career.

In April, staying at the $25k tournament level that had recently brought her so much success, she reached another semifinal at Patras, Greece (losing in three sets to Estonian world No. 240, Margit Rüütel), but only reached the second-round at Bari, Italy, before retiring when trailing upcoming French player Alizé Cornet 6–0, 4–1.

In early May she decided to return to the WTA Tour, entering qualifying for the Tier I German Open in Berlin while ranked world No. 94. However, she lost in three sets in the second round of the qualifying draw to Ukrainian world No. 147, Julia Vakulenko. The next week, she lost in the first round of qualifying for the Tier I Italian Open in Rome to world No. 115, Victoria Azarenka, in straight sets.

At the end of the month, entering a major tournament as a direct entrant for the first time at the French Open, as world No. 100, she defeated lower-ranked wildcard Stéphanie Cohen-Aloro, before losing in straight sets to world No. 9, Patty Schnyder, in round two.

The following week, in early June, she entered a $75k event at Prostějov in the Czech Republic and defeated two Czech players in succession, world No. 31, Lucie Šafářová, and world No. 239, Renata Voráčová, before losing in the quarterfinals to in-form Italian Romina Oprandi, in straight sets.

Buoyed by her career-best ranking of world No. 86, she reached the second round of the Tier III tournament at Birmingham with a straight-sets win over Yuan Meng, before losing to Japanese veteran Ai Sugiyama. She then came through three rounds of qualifying in straight sets at Eastbourne, a Tier II tournament, with wins over Stéphanie Foretz, Galina Voskoboeva and Samantha Stosur but lost in the first round of the main draw to Russian former world No. 2, Anastasia Myskina. A week later, as a direct entrant at Wimbledon, she lost to Australian Nicole Pratt in the first round.

At the $50k event in Vittel, France she won the event, beating Frenchwoman Olivia Sanchez. Her ranking rose to No. 86. However, in the Tier IV tournament in Budapest the following week, she lost in the first round to fellow Slovak Martina Suchá.

As a direct entrant to the main draw of the US Open, she reached the third round with straight-sets victories over Alexa Glatch and the Viktoriya Kutuzova, before succumbing to Dinara Safina, 3–6, 0–6. As a result, her ranking leapt to No. 65.

Despite an uninspired finish to 2006, she finished the year ranked world No. 71.

=== 2007 ===
She began the new season, still in Australia, at the end of December 2006, by narrowly failing to qualify for Gold Coast. Then in qualifying for Hobart in January, she fell at the first hurdle to Klára Zakopalová in straight sets. And as a direct entrant to the Australian Open, she lost in round one to Venezuelan Milagros Sequera, also in straight sets.

In February, she managed to pull together a string of back-to-back victories in a $75k tournament at Las Vegas, with wins over Kristina Barrois, Ahsha Rolle and Tatiana Poutchek, before bowing out to Akiko Morigami in the semifinals.

In March, as a direct entrant to the Tier I Indian Wells Open, ranked world No. 90, she lost in the first round to Caroline Wozniacki. Then she came through qualifying for Miami with a straight-sets wins over Kristina Barrois and Anne Kremer, before losing a close two-setter in the first round of the main draw to Catalina Castaño of Colombia. And in the first round of the main draw of the Tier II fixture at Amelia Island, her ranking having slipped back to world No. 99, she was defeated by American Alexa Glatch, also in straight sets.

In May, ranked No. 95, she reached the quarterfinals of the Tier IV WTA Prague Open with straight-sets victories over Anastasia Rodionova and Sandra Klösel, before losing to Marion Bartoli. At the end of the month, in the first round, she lost to Andrea Petkovic at the French Open.

In June at Wimbledon, she defeated Meghann Shaughnessy, before losing to Jelena Janković in round two, 1–6, 1–6. She returned to action in mid-August in Canada, again ranked No. 105, and attempted to qualify for the Tier I Canadian Open, but lost to Flavia Pennetta. Her only other tournament that month was the US Open, where she again faced Jelena Janković, this time losing 2–6, 6–7.

The Slovak would play only four more tournaments that season, recording her sole victory in the first round of the Tier III event at Kolkata, India against Youlia Fedossova of France in mid-September. Her ranking was No. 142 by the end of the year.

=== 2008 ===
Gajdošová received a wildcard into the main draw of the Australian Women's Hardcourts in Gold Coast, Australia where she lost in the first round to world No. 15, Dinara Safina, 6–4, 1–6, 2–6. She then lost in the second round of the qualifying competition for the Sydney International to world No. 100, Jill Craybas. Gajdošová then received a wildcard into the main draw of the Australian Open where she lost in the first round to then-world No. 7, Serena Williams.

She then played two tournaments in the United States, and lost in the first round of the qualifying competition for the Tier I Indian Wells Open to world No. 101, Alla Kudryavtseva, 2–6, 0–6, and in the first round of the ITF event in Redding, California to world No. 199, Margalita Chakhnashvili by retirement.

She then played three ITF Circuit tournaments in South Korea. In Incheon, she lost in the first round to world No. 374, Lee Jin-a. The following week, Gajdošová won the tournament in Gimcheon, defeating No. 295 Lu Jingjing in the final. She then lost in the second round of the tournament in Changwon to world No. 432, Zhang Ling, in straight sets. As of 26 May 2008, her ranking had dropped to No. 195.

=== 2009: First major appearance ===
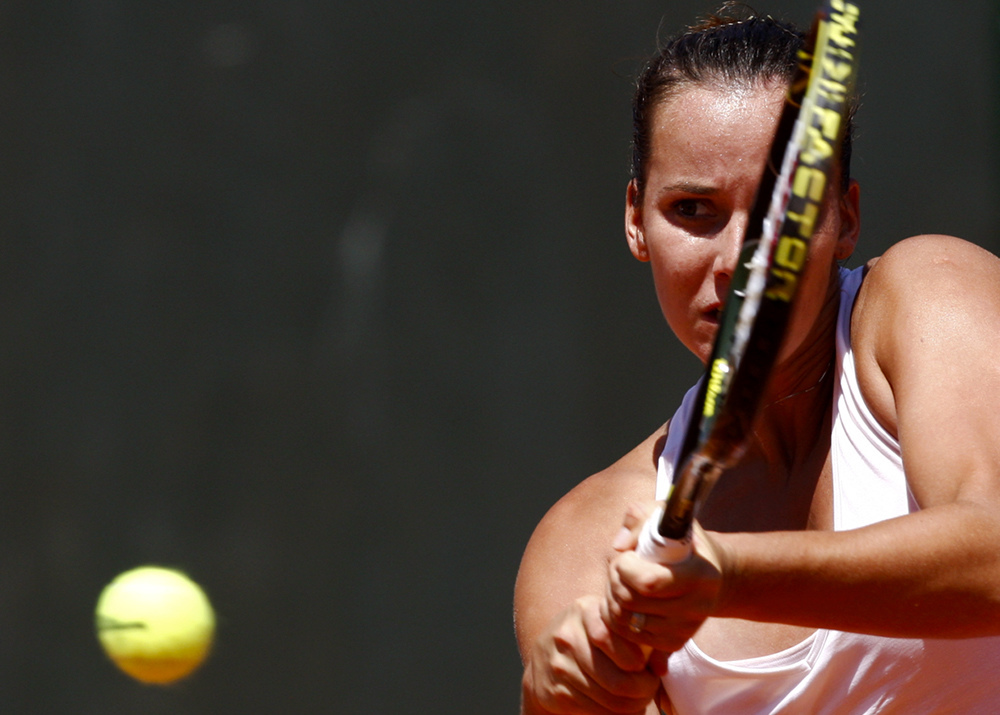
Wolfe (then known as Groth) at 2009 Estoril Open

Gajdošová started the year at the Brisbane International losing in a tight second round to eventual champion Victoria Azarenka. In the Sydney International, she again lost in the second round to eventual champion Elena Dementieva. At the Australian Open, Gajdošová lost a tight three-setter to Virginie Razzano making it her fourth straight first-round loss at the first major of the year. She then married Sam Groth, taking his name from February onwards.

At the 2009 Indian Wells tournament, she played in the qualifying winning her first and losing her final qualifying match, resulting in a slight rise in the rankings. At Roland Garros, Groth defeated French wildcard Kinnie Laisné and Mariana Duque Marino. She then lost to fifth seed Jelena Janković in the third round, 1–6, 1–6.

At Wimbledon, Groth defeated Lucie Šafářová in the first round and then lost to second seed Serena Williams 2–6, 1–6. After solid performances at both Roland Garros and Wimbledon, Groth booked a career-high singles ranking of No. 57.

She was then out of action with an ankle injury until returning to the tour in 2010 as a fully fledged Australian player available for Fed Cup Team selection, after being granted Australian citizenship on 23 November 2009.

=== 2010: Top 50 breakthrough and first singles WTA Tour title ===
Starting 2010 with the task to re-enter the top 100 she started the year at Brisbane and Sydney falling in second round of qualifying. Then lost another tough three-set first round at Australia Open to Sofia Arvidsson. Groth remained in Australia to gain ranking points and was very successful winning the $25k Sydney, finalist at the $25k Burnie and a quarterfinalist at the Mildura ITF event. She also had success in doubles with a semifinal and final showings at the Burnie and Mildura ITF events. She received a wildcard entry into the French Open and played Chan Yung-jan in the first round. Groth moved into the second round winning 6–2, 6–3. She then played Kimiko Date-Krumm from Japan and beat Date-Krumm who had knocked out Safina the round before, 6–0, 6–3. Groth then faced fellow Australian player Anastasia Rodionova. They played a long three-setter but Groth prevailed. In the fourth round, she lost to Kazakh Yaroslava Shvedova. Her French Open performance was her best in Grand Slam tournaments whereafter she was ranked No. 88.

At Wimbledon, she progressed to the fourth round where she was beaten by Venus Williams. On 23 August, she reached a new career high ranking of 56 and became the second highest ranked Australian behind No. 6, Samantha Stosur.

At the US Open, she lost to Maria Sharapova in the first round in three sets. In doubles, partnering Klára Zakopalová, she defeated Angelique Kerber and Līga Dekmeijere.

After the US Open, Groth participated in the Guangzhou International Open as top seed and made it in the semifinals stunning Edina Gallovits, 6–0, 6–1 in 38 minutes. In her first WTA Tour final, Groth defeated Alla Kudryavtseva 6–1, 6–4 to win her maiden title. Groth's ranking rose to a career-high of 41, as a result of her performance.

Her next tournament was the Korea Open where she lost to top seed Nadia Petrova in the first round.

=== 2011: Career best ranking ===
Groth started off the year at the Brisbane International where she reached the quarterfinals by beating No. 1 seed Sam Stosur in the previous round. It was Groth's first win against a top-10 player. However, she lost to German Andrea Petkovic. She then competed at the Hobart International where she defeated Johanna Larsson, Tamira Paszek, fourth seed Roberta Vinci and Klára Zakopalová all in straight sets to reach the final. Groth defeated Bethanie Mattek-Sands in the final to gain her second WTA title. In doubles, Groth and her partner Zakopalová won their first-round match in straight sets and then against fourth seeds Natalie Grandin and Vladimíra Uhlířová in the quarterfinals. They lost to Kateryna Bondarenko and Līga Dekmeijere in the semifinals. At the Australian Open, she lost in the first round to 2009 US Open semifinalist Yanina Wickmayer in a close three-set match.

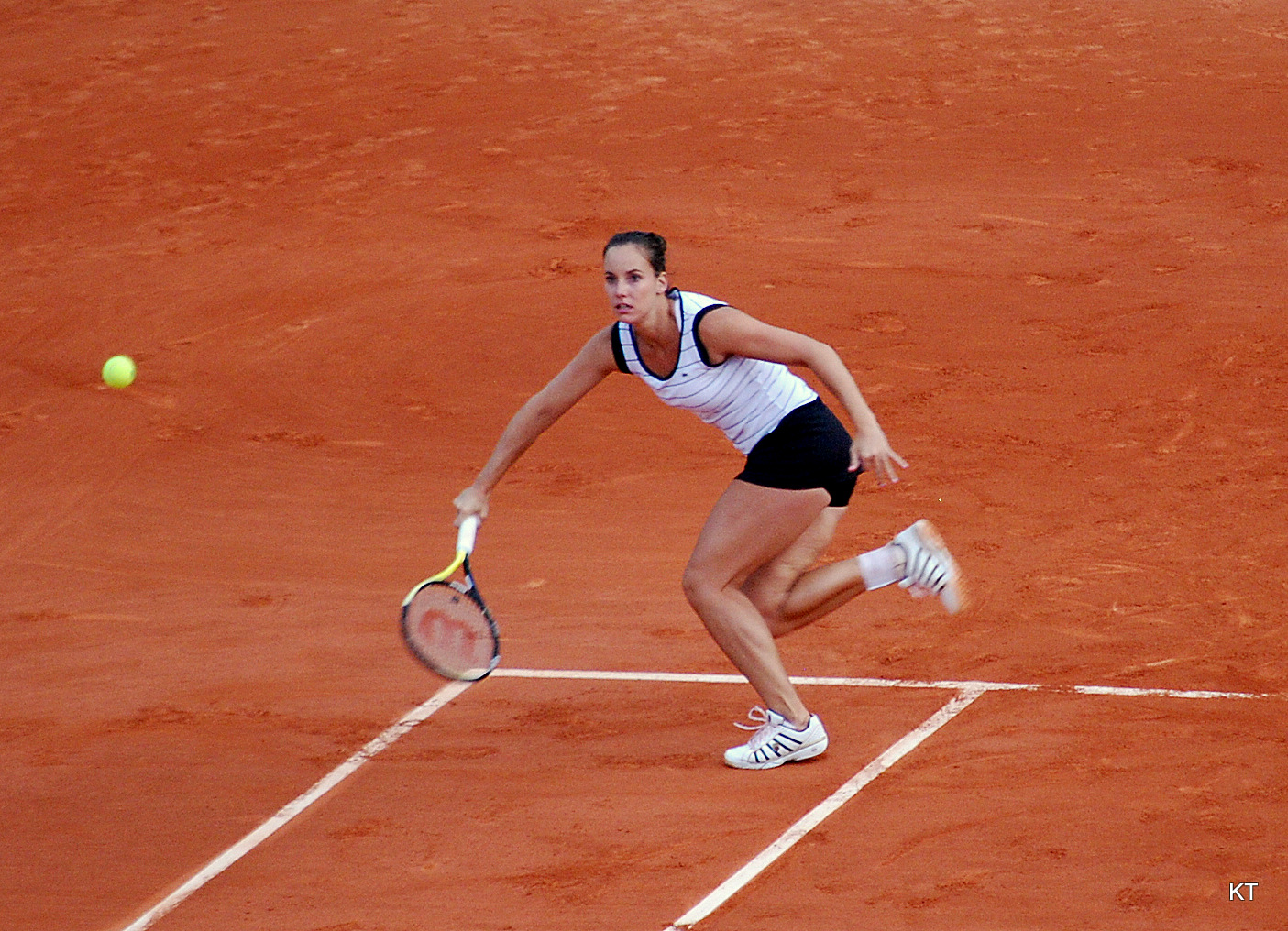
Wolfe at French Open 2011

Groth then became part of the Australia Fed Cup team for the first time. Despite Australia losing the tie, she managed to win against world No. 4, Francesca Schiavone, after dropping the first set. Groth then played at the Dubai Championships where she defeated Dominika Cibulková in the first round. However, she lost to 15th seed Alisa Kleybanova. She then took part in the Qatar Ladies Open where she had to qualify to reach the main draw. As the top seed in qualifying, she eliminated wildcard player Selima Sfar in the first round, fellow Australian Jelena Dokić in the second and sixth seed Timea Bacsinszky. In the main draw, she faced Dominika Cibulková in the first round, and lost 8–10 in the third set tiebreak. Groth's next tournament was the Malaysian Open. Having received a wildcard into the main draw, she was seeded fourth and won against qualifier Sun Shengnan and followed that up with a win against Misaki Doi. She then defeated the sixth seed Ayumi Morita in three close sets to advance to the semifinals where she met her doubles partner and ended up losing to fifth seed Šafářová, in straight sets.

Groth was the 29th seed at the Indian Wells Open, received a first-round bye, and was defeated in the second by Sara Errani. At the Miami Open, Groth was seeded No. 28 and had again a first-round bye. In the second round, she defeated Yaroslava Shvedova. Groth was up by a set and break but was defeated in the next round by world No. 3, Vera Zvonareva.

Groth travelled to Melbourne to partake with Anastasia Rodionova in the Fed Cup World Group play-offs. Although she won both of her singles matches against Olga Savchuk and Lesia Tsurenko, Rodionova lost both of her singles matches. As such, it came down to the doubles, where despite easily taking the first set 6–0, Groth and Rodionova ended up losing to Savchuk and Tsurenko. Australia, as a result, was relegated to the 2012 Fed Cup World Group II.

At the Estoril Open, Wolfe, who from that point changed her name to Gajdošová, was seeded second. She defeated Renata Voráčová and compatriot Casey Dellacqua to successfully defend her quarterfinal appearance. However, she advanced no further as she lost to Monica Niculescu. Gajdošová competed at the Madrid Open where she defeated Maria Kirilenko in the first round in a third set tiebreak. She then upset tenth seed Agnieszka Radwańska in three sets before losing to Lucie Šafářová.

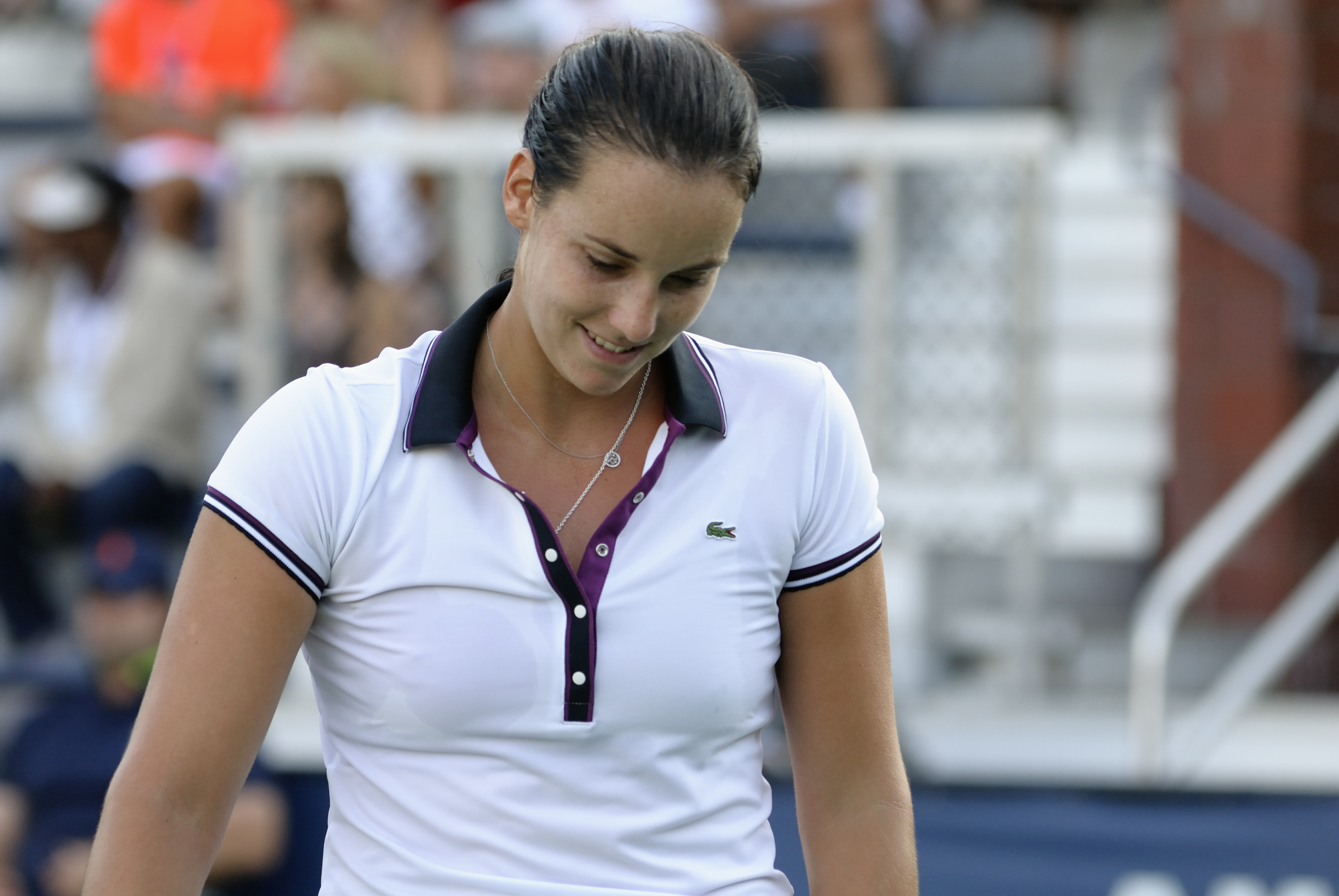
Wolfe at the 2011 US Open

Her next tournament was the Italian Open, where she opened up by defeating wildcard Corinna Dentoni and followed that up with a win against Bethanie Mattek-Sands. Her next opponent was world No. 6 and fourth seed, Li Na, and she lost in straight sets. In doubles, Groth partnered with Romanian Alexandra Dulgheru as an alternate. Their run ended in the semifinals against Chinese pair of Peng Shuai and Zheng Jie. However, their best victory was in the quarterfinals when they upset top seed and world No. 1 doubles players, Gisela Dulko and Flavia Pennetta, in straight sets.

Gajdošová beat Virginie Razzano and Anabel Medina Garrigues in the French Open, where she was seeded 24th, but lost in three sets in the third round to Andrea Petkovic, the 15th seed. At the Wimbledon Championships, she defeated former top-20 player Alona Bondarenko. As the last Australian standing in the women's singles draw, she then beat Andrea Hlaváčková to reach the third round, but lost against world No. 1, Caroline Wozniacki. She then went on a five-match losing streak: losing in first rounds at the Gastein Ladies Open, Mercury Insurance Open in Carlsbad, Canadian Open in Toronto, the Western & Southern Open in Cincinnati, and at the Texas Tennis Open. She broke her losing streak at the US Open; although hitting 57 unforced errors, she did hit 29 winners, and it was enough to defeat Iveta Benešová. However, in the second round she was defeated by Vania King.

Gajdošová's first tournament of the Asian swing was at the Guangzhou International Open where she was the defending champion. She reached the quarterfinals by defeating Han Xinyun and Mandy Minella. In the quarterfinal however, she lost to world No. 72, Magdaléna Rybáriková. Gajdosova then played in the Pan Pacific Open where in the first round she played world No. 55, Rebecca Marino, and won in three sets. She then played world No. 1, Caroline Wozniacki, going down in three sets. The next week she played at the China Open where she defeated world No. 29, Medina Garrigues, but again lost to Wozniacki, this time in straight sets. Her last tournament of the year was at the Japan Open where she lost in the second round. Gajdošová ended the year ranked world No. 33 in singles and No. 41 in doubles.

=== 2012: Wrist injury and loss of form ===
She started her year at the 2012 Hopman Cup partnering Lleyton Hewitt. In the first tie against Spain, Gajdošová put Australia up by beating Medina Garrigues in three sets. They eventually lost the tie by losing the deciding mixed doubles, 9–11 in the final set tiebreak despite leading 5–1. In the second tie against France, Gajdošová left the court in tears after losing to Marion Bartoli, 0–6, 0–6. In the final tie against China, Gajdošová lost to Li Na, however Australia won the tie in the mixed doubles. She then played at the Hobart International, where she was the defending champion. In the first round, she defeated Ayumi Morita in straight sets and then defeated Anastasia Rodionova in a very tough second-round match. Although she started well against qualifier Mona Barthel, she lost in three sets to the eventual champion.

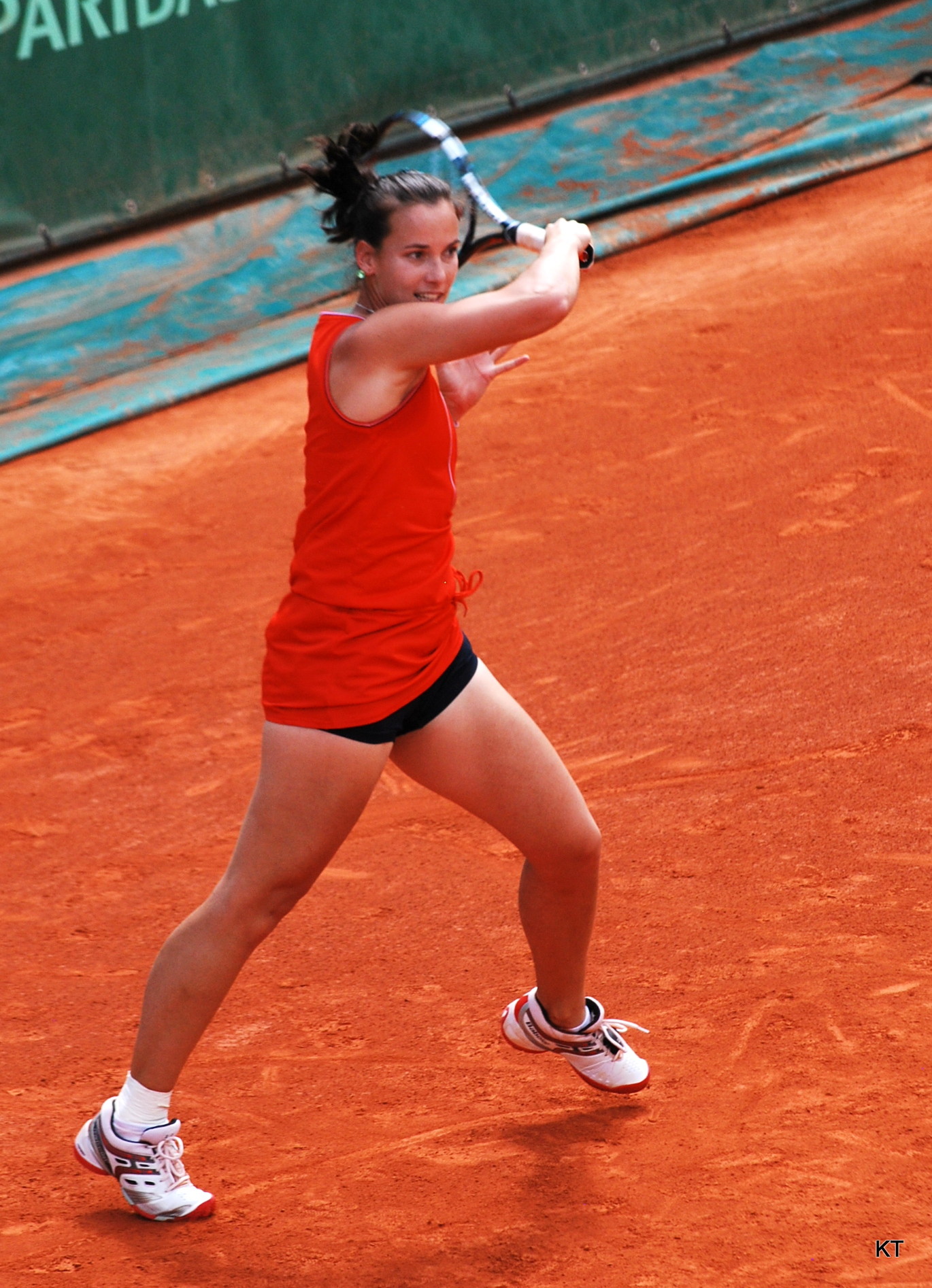
At Roland Garros, 2012

Gajdošová then played in the Australian Open, where she faced Maria Kirilenko. She was trying to get past the first round for the first time in seven attempts, but lost the match. Gajdošová left that disappointing result behind and headed to Fribourg, Switzerland to take on the Swiss in the Fed Cup. She competed in the second singles rubber, but had a loss to Stefanie Vögele. She then played in the fourth rubber and confirmed a victory for Australia with a three-sets win over Amra Sadiković.

Gajdošová then competed at the Open GdF Suez, where she again lost her opening round in three sets to Monica Niculescu. She then lost in the first round of the Qatar Ladies Open to Sorana Cîrstea. She was the fourth seed at the Malaysian Open where she won her first round over Kathrin Wörle, after losing the first set. She lost her second-round match against Eleni Daniilidou.

At Indian Wells, she defeated American wildcard CoCo Vandeweghe. In the second round she defeated Yanina Wickmayer after another first-set loss. She lost in the third round to American Jamie Hampton. Gajdošová was down 2–5 in the second-set but came back to win it in a tie-break, but eventually lost the match. At the Miami Open, she was dealt a tough first-round match against four-time Grand Slam winner Kim Clijsters, who had not played since the Australian Open semifinal. Gajdošová started well and won the opening set, before Clijsters came storming back to win with just the loss of one more game.

Her next tournament was the Family Circle Cup, where she played Stefanie Vögele in the first round and lost in three sets. Gajdošová then competed in the 2012 Fed Cup World Group play-offs against Germany in Stuttgart, enjoying a return to good form where she beat top 20 player Julia Görges. At the 2012 Summer Olympics, she partnered Anastasia Rodionova in the women's doubles.

She finished the year as world No. 183.

=== 2013 ===
Gajdošová began her season at the Brisbane International as a wildcard. She came back from a set down to defeat world No. 16 Roberta Vinci in the first round and thus ended her nine-match losing streak from the previous season. She lost in the second round to Lesia Tsurenko despite winning the first set. After receiving a wildcard into the Hobart International, Gajdošová reached the quarterfinals for the third consecutive year, after defeating Romina Oprandi and Olga Govortsova but lost to the eventual champion Elena Vesnina, in straight sets. At the Australian Open, Gajdošová failed to progress beyond the first round of the event for the eighth consecutive year, losing to 20th seed Yanina Wickmayer in straight sets. However, she won the mixed doubles title with compatriot Matthew Ebden and in doing so, won her first Grand Slam and first mixed-doubles title. This win made Gajdošová and Ebden the third all Australian pairing to win the Australian Open mixed doubles title and the first since 2005 when Samantha Stosur and Scott Draper won that title.

In April, Gajdošová was diagnosed with mononucleosis which left her out of the game for six months. She made her comeback at the Nanjing Ladies Open where she advanced to the semifinals, before losing to Ayumi Morita. At the Wildcard Playoff for the Australian Open, Gajdošová opened with a straight-sets win over Jelena Dokic. However, she lost in the quarterfinals against Tammi Patterson. Gajdošová ended 2013 ranked No. 232 in the world.

=== 2014: Comeback to top 100 ===
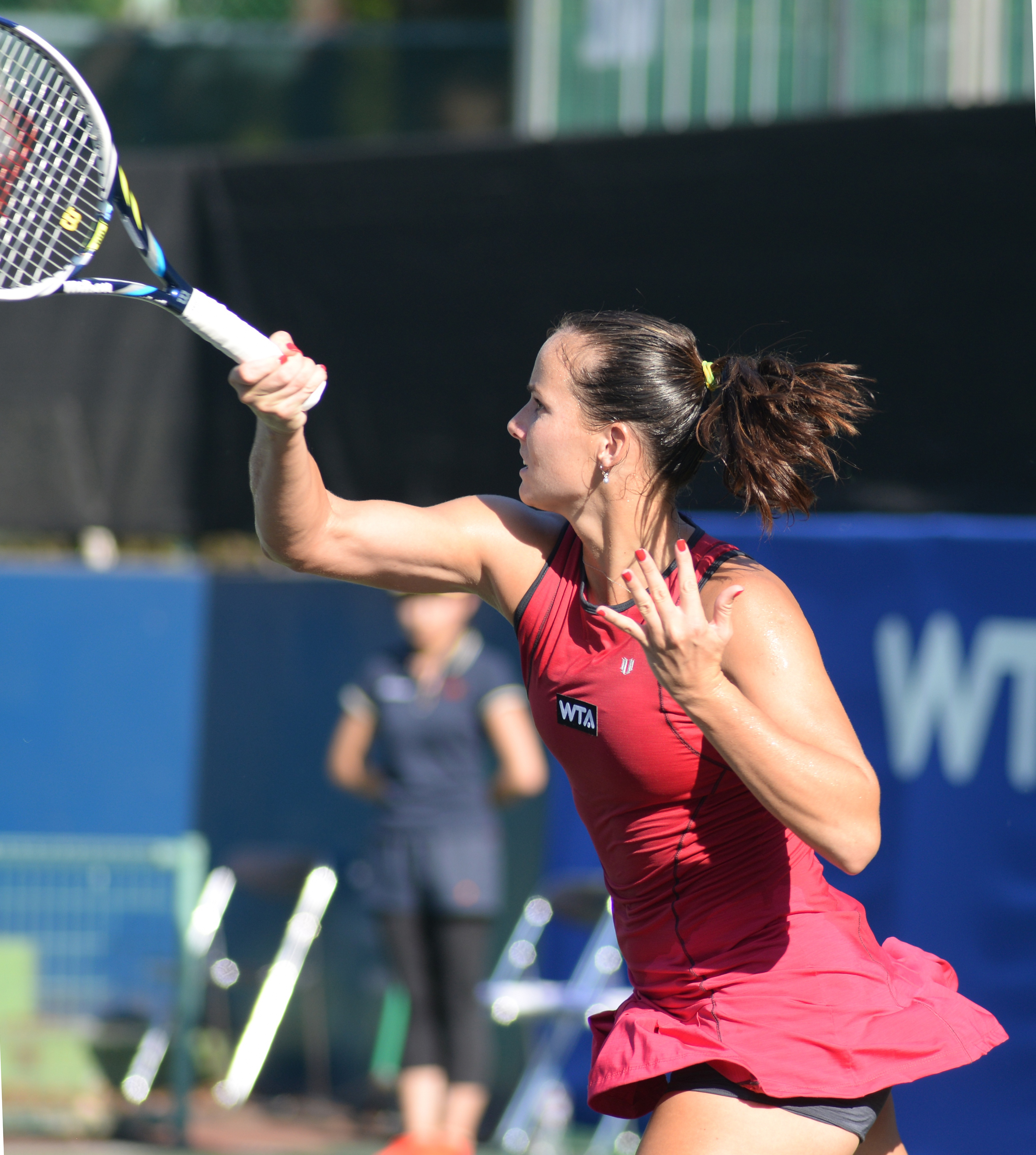
At the 2014 Pan Pacific Open

Gajdošová received a wildcard for the Sydney International but lost in the opening round against Lauren Davis. She was also awarded a wildcard for the Australian Open but lost in the first round to Angelique Kerber. In mixed doubles, teaming up again with Matthew Ebden, she reached the semifinals.

In June, Gajdošová won the Nottingham Challenge defeating Timea Bacsinszky 6–2, 6–2 in the singles final. This earned a wildcard into Wimbledon Championships and was her first title in over three years. Gajdošová also won the doubles draw, pairing with Arina Rodionova.

=== 2015: Returning form then fading ===
Gajdošová started her 2015 season at the Brisbane International as a wildcard entrant. In the first round, she defeated Zhang Shuai to set up a second-round match against second seed and world No. 7, Ana Ivanovic, to whom she eventually lost in straight sets.

Gajdošová then played at the Sydney International defeating world No. 13, Andrea Petkovic, and No. 11, Dominika Cibulková, before losing to eventual champion Petra Kvitová in the quarterfinal, 6–4, 3–6, 4–6. She next played at the Australian Open, where she had never won a main-draw match, but she was able to break her duck there (on her tenth attempt) defeating Alexandra Dulgheru, in straight sets, before losing to world No. 3, Simona Halep, in straight sets.

Gajdošová then played in the Fed Cup World Group where she defeated world No. 10, Angelique Kerber, in three sets. She then lost to Andrea Petkovic in another three set match. Jarmila then played at the Thailand Open as the sixth seed where she lost to eventual finalist Ajla Tomljanović in the second round. Gajdošová then contested the Dubai Championships where she qualified for the main draw but lost in three sets to eventual semifinalist, Garbiñe Muguruza. The following week, she failed to qualify for the Qatar Ladies Open losing to Alexandra Dulgheru. Gajdošová then had a great run at the Malaysian Open where she was the fourth seed. She reached the semifinals, before again losing to Dulgheru. Following this, she played at the Indian Wells Open where she lost in the first round to Roberta Vinci.

Gajdošová started her clay-court season at the 2015 Fed Cup World Group play-offs where she lost to lower ranked players Kiki Bertens and Arantxa Rus, and as a result, Australia was relegated to the Fed Cup World Group II in 2016. She then contested the Premier Mandatory Madrid Open where she lost to world No. 5, Caroline Wozniacki. The following week she played at the Italian Open, where she defeated Elena Vesnina in a thrilling third set tiebreak which she won 16–14. She then retired against world No. 3, Maria Sharapova, after trailing 6–2, 3–1. She lost in the first round of the French Open to the lower ranked Amandine Hesse.

Gajdošová then qualified at Nottingham before being defeated in the first round by Christina McHale. She lost in the first round at Birmingham to Johanna Konta, before qualifying at Eastbourne, winning the first round against Lauren Davis, before losing in the second to Caroline Wozniacki.

Gajdošová lost in the first round at Wimbledon to Sabine Lisicki, lost in the first round in Washington, D.C. to Naomi Broady and in the first round of the US Open to the eventual winner Flavia Pennetta.

Gajdošová reached the second round in Tokyo, defeating qualifier Alexandra Panova, before losing to Kateryna Bondarenko. She ended the year with a poor run of failures in qualifying, and then losing in the first round in Hong Kong to Yaroslava Shvedova.

In December, Gajdošová competed for the Philippine Mavericks in the International Premier Tennis League losing to Agnieszka Radwańska and Kurumi Nara, before defeating Kristina Mladenovic.

=== 2016 ===
Under her married name, Wolfe partnered Lleyton Hewitt in the Australia Gold Team for the Hopman Cup in Perth in January. In the tie against the United States, Wolfe defeated world No. 1, Serena Williams, albeit the American retired due to a knee injury. She was beaten by Karolína Plíšková and Elina Svitolina in the respective ties against the Czech Republic and Ukraine.

At the Australian Open, Wolfe was forced to retire, a set and 2–4 down in the second, in her first-round match against Anastasija Sevastova, after sustaining a back injury during the warm-up.

=== 2017 ===
In January 2017, Wolfe announced her retirement from the tour.

== Performance timelines ==
Key
W	F	SF	QF	#R	RR	Q#	P#	DNQ	A	Z#	PO	G	S	B	NMS	NTI	P	NH

(W) winner; (F) finalist; (SF) semifinalist; (QF) quarterfinalist; (#R) rounds 4, 3, 2, 1; (RR) round-robin stage; (Q#) qualification round; (P#) preliminary round; (DNQ) did not qualify; (A) absent; (Z#) Davis/Fed Cup Zonal Group (with number indication) or (PO) play-off; (G) gold, (S) silver or (B) bronze Olympic/Paralympic medal; (NMS) not a Masters tournament; (NTI) not a Tier I tournament; (P) postponed; (NH) not held; (SR) strike rate (events won / competed); (W–L) win–loss record.
To avoid confusion and double counting, these charts are updated at the conclusion of a tournament or when the player's participation has ended.

Only main-draw results in WTA Tour, Grand Slam tournaments, Fed Cup and Olympic Games are included in win–loss records.

Note: Wolfe played under Slovak flag until 2009.

=== Singles ===
Tournament	2003	2004	2005	2006	2007	2008	2009	2010	2011	2012	2013	2014	2015	2016	SR	W–L	Win%
Grand Slam tournaments
Australian Open	A	Q2	Q1	1R	1R	1R	1R	1R	1R	1R	1R	1R	2R	1R	0 / 11	1–11	8%
French Open	A	Q1	Q2	2R	1R	1R	3R	4R	3R	2R	A	Q2	1R	A	0 / 8	9–8	53%
Wimbledon	A	Q3	A	1R	2R	Q3	2R	4R	3R	1R	A	2R	1R	A	0 / 8	8–8	50%
US Open	Q3	Q1	Q1	3R	1R	Q2	1R	1R	2R	1R	A	1R	1R	A	0 / 8	3–8	27%
Win–loss	0–0	0–0	0–0	3–4	1–4	0–2	3–4	6–4	5–4	1–4	0–1	1–3	1–4	0–1	0 / 35	21–35	38%
WTA Premier Mandatory & 5 + former
Dubai / Qatar Open (Note: The first Premier 5 event of the year has switched back and forth between the Dubai Tennis Championships and the Qatar Ladies Open since 2009. Dubai was classified as a Premier 5 event from 2009 to 2011 before being succeeded by Doha for the 2012–2014 period. In 2015, Dubai regained its Premier 5 status while Doha was demoted to Premier status. The Premier 5 tournaments were reclassified as WTA 1000 tournaments in 2021.)	NMS						A	A	2R	1R	A	A	1R	A	0 / 3	1–3	25%
Indian Wells Open	A	Q1	A	A	1R	Q1	Q2	A	2R	3R	A	A	1R	Q1	0 / 4	2–4	33%
Miami Open	A	A	A	A	1R	A	Q2	A	3R	1R	Q1	A	A	A	0 / 3	1–3	25%
Berlin / Madrid Open (Note: In 2009, the German Open was replaced by the Madrid Open. The Premier Mandatory tournaments were reclassified as WTA 1000 tournaments in 2021.)	A	A	A	Q2	A	A	A	A	3R	1R	A	A	1R	A	0 / 3	2–3	40%
Italian Open	A	A	A	Q1	A	A	A	A	3R	2R	A	A	2R	A	0 / 3	3–3	50%
Canadian Open	A	A	A	A	Q2	A	A	2R	1R	A	A	A	Q2	A	0 / 2	1–2	33%
Cincinnati Open	NH/NMS						Q1	A	1R	Q1	A	A	Q1	A	0 / 1	0–1	0%
Pan Pacific / Wuhan Open (Note: In 2014, the Pan Pacific Open was downgraded to a Premier event and replaced by the Wuhan Open. The Premier 5 tournaments were reclassified as WTA 1000 tournaments in 2021.)	A	A	A	A	A	A	A	Q2	2R	A	A	2R	Q1	A	0 / 2	2–2	50%
China Open	NMS						A	A	2R	A	A	Q1	Q1	A	0 / 1	1–1	50%
Charleston Open (former)	A	A	A	A	2R		NMS								0 / 1	1–1	50%
Zurich Open (former)	A	A	A	1R	A	NH/NMS									0 / 1	0–1	0%
Win–loss	0–0	0–0	0–0	0–1	1–3	0–0	0–0	1–1	8–9	2–5	0–0	1–1	1–4	0–0	0 / 24	14–24	37%
Career statistics
Tournaments	1	1	2	12	14	6	14	13	24	19	4	10	18	2	Career total: 140		
Titles	0	0	0	0	0	0	0	1	1	0	0	0	0	0	Career total: 1		
Finals	0	0	0	0	0	0	0	1	1	0	0	0	0	0	Career total: 1		
Overall win–loss	2–1	0–1	2–2	8–12	6–14	3–6	9–14	19–12	31–24	9–20	6–6	6–10	12–21	0–2	1 / 140	113–145	44%
Year-end ranking	197	217	145	71	145	98	112	42	33	180	232	71	102	621	$2,732,099		

=== Doubles ===
Tournament	2006	2007	2008	2009	2010	2011	2012	2013	2014	2015	SR	W–L	Win%
Grand Slam tournaments
Australian Open	A	2R	1R	1R	1R	2R	3R	1R	QF	2R	0 / 9	8–9	47%
French Open	A	3R	A	1R	A	2R	QF	A	A	1R	0 / 5	6–5	55%
Wimbledon	3R	2R	A	1R	Q1	2R	A	A	A	3R	0 / 5	6–5	55%
US Open	1R	2R	A	1R	2R	3R	A	A	3R	1R	0 / 7	6–7	46%
Win–loss	2–2	5–4	0–1	0–4	1–2	5–4	5–2	0–1	5–2	3–4	0 / 26	26–26	50%
National representation
Summer Olympics	NH		A	NH			1R	NH			0 / 1	0–1	0%
Premier Mandatory & 5 + former
Dubai / Qatar Open	NMS		A	A	A	2R	A	A	A	1R	0 / 2	1–2	33%
Indian Wells Open	A	1R	1R	A	A	A	QF	A	A	1R	0 / 4	2–4	33%
Miami Open	A	1R	A	A	A	A	1R	2R	A	A	0 / 3	1–3	25%
Berlin / Madrid Open	Q2	A	A	A	A	A	1R	A	A	1R	0 / 2	0–2	0%
Italian Open	A	A	A	A	A	SF	1R	A	A	A	0 / 2	3–2	60%
Canadian Open	A	1R	A	A	A	1R	A	A	A	A	0 / 2	0–2	0%
Cincinnati Open	NMS			A	A	A	1R	A	A	1R	0 / 2	0–2	0%
Pan Pacific / Wuhan Open	A	A	A	A	A	A	A	A	2R	A	0 / 1	1–1	50%
China Open	NMS			A	A	2R	A	A	QF	A	0 / 2	3–2	60%
Charleston Open (former)	A	1R	A	NMS							0 / 1	0–1	0%
Zurich Open (former)	1R	A	NMS/NH								0 / 1	0–1	0%
Win–loss	0–1	0–4	0–1	0–0	0–0	5–4	2–5	1–1	3–2	0–4	0 / 22	11–22	33%

== Grand Slam tournament finals ==
=== Mixed doubles: 1 (title) ===
Result	Year	Championship	Surface	Partner	Opponents	Score
Win	2013	Australian Open	Hard	(Australia) Matthew Ebden	(Czech Republic) Lucie Hradecká (Czech Republic) František Čermák	6–3, 7–5

== WTA Tour finals ==
=== Singles: 2 (2 titles) ===
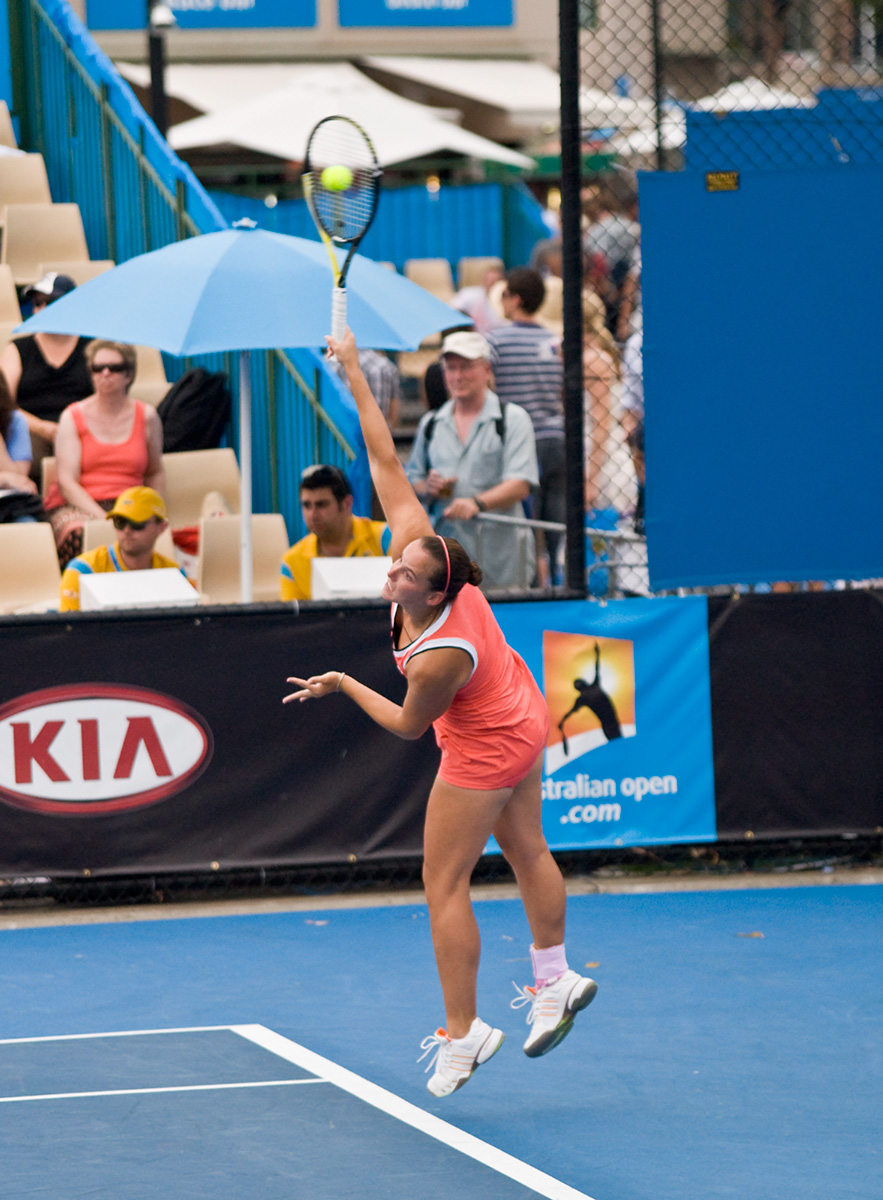
Wolfe in Melbourne

Legend International (2–0)	Finals by surface Hard (2–0)

Result	W–L	Date	Tournament	Tier	Surface	Opponent	Score
Win	1–0	Sep 2010	Guangzhou International, China	International	Hard	(Russia) Alla Kudryavtseva	6–1, 6–4
Win	2–0	Jan 2011	Hobart International, Australia	International	Hard	(United States) Bethanie Mattek-Sands	6–4, 6–3

=== Doubles: 6 (1 title, 5 runner-ups) ===
Legend Premier (0–1) International (1–4)	Finals by surface Hard (1–4) Clay (0–1)

Result	W–L	Date	Tournament	Tier	Surface	Partner	Opponents	Score
Win	1–0	Aug 2006	Nordic Light Open, Sweden	Tier IV (Note: In 2009, the WTA Tier II tournaments were reclassified as WTA Premier tournaments, while the WTA Tier III tournaments, WTA Tier IV tournaments and WTA Tier V tournaments were reclassified as WTA International tournaments.)	Hard	(Czech Republic) Eva Birnerová	(China) Yan Zi (China) Zheng Jie	0–6, 6–4, 6–2
Loss	1–1	Feb 2007	Cellular South Cup, United States	Tier III	Hard	(Japan) Akiko Morigami	(Australia) Nicole Pratt (Australia) Bryanne Stewart	5–7, 6–4, [5–10]
Loss	1–2	Jul 2011	Gastein Ladies, Austria	International	Clay	(Germany) Julia Görges	(Czech Republic) Eva Birnerová (Czech Republic) Lucie Hradecká	6–4, 2–6, [10–12]
Loss	1–3	Jul 2012	Silicon Valley Classic, United States	Premier	Hard	(United States) Vania King	(New Zealand) Marina Erakovic (United Kingdom) Heather Watson	5–7, 6–7^{(7–9)}
Loss	1–4	Sep 2012	Guangzhou International, China	International	Hard	(Romania) Monica Niculescu	(Thailand) Tamarine Tanasugarn (China) Zhang Shuai	6–2, 2–6, [8–10]
Loss	1–5	Jan 2016	Hobart International, Australia	International	Hard	(Australia) Kimberly Birrell	(China) Han Xinyun (United States) Christina McHale	3–6, 0–6

== ITF Circuit finals ==
Legend
$100,000 tournaments
$75,000 tournaments
$50,000 tournaments
$25,000 tournaments
$10,000 tournaments

=== Singles: 18 (14 titles, 4 runner-ups) ===
Result	W–L	Date	Tournament	Tier	Surface	Opponent	Score
Win	1–0	Feb 2003	ITF Rabat, Morocco	10,000	Clay	(Spain) Astrid Waernes-Garcia	6–3, 6–0
Loss	1–1	May 2004	Fukuoka International, Japan	50,000	Grass	(Serbia) Ana Ivanovic	2–6, 7–6^{(4)}, 6–7^{(4)}
Win	2–1	May 2005	ITF Catania, Italy	25,000	Clay	(Croatia) Ivana Abramović	6–3, 7–5
Win	3–1	Jul 2005	ITF Felixstowe, England	25,000	Grass	(Russia) Alla Kudryavtseva	7–5, 6–1
Win	4–1	Feb 2006	ITF Sydney, Australia	25,000	Hard	(Australia) Sophie Ferguson	6–4, 3–6, 7–6^{(3)}
Win	5–1	Feb 2006	ITF Gosford, Australia	25,000	Hard	(Chinese Taipei) Chan Yung-jan	6–3, 3–0 ret.
Win	6–1	Mar 2006	ITF Canberra, Australia	25,000	Clay	(Australia) Monique Adamczak	7–6^{(5)}, 6–2
Win	7–1	Jul 2006	ITF Vittel, France	50,000	Clay	(France) Olivia Sanchez	6–4, 6–0
Win	8–1	May 2008	ITF Gimcheon, South Korea	25,000	Hard	(China) Lu Jingjing	6–3, 6–2
Loss	8–2	Sep 2008	ITF Rockhampton, Australia	25,000	Hard	(Australia) Monique Adamczak	6–4, 2–6, 6–7^{(4)}
Win	9–2	Sep 2008	ITF Kawana, Australia	25,000	Hard	(Australia) Isabella Holland	7–5, 6–4
Win	10–2	Oct 2008	ITF Traralgon, Australia	25,000	Hard	(United Kingdom) Melanie South	6–3, 3–6, 6–1
Win	11–2	Oct 2008	Taipei Open, Taiwan	100,000	Carpet	(Italy) Corinna Dentoni	4–6, 6–4, 6–1
Loss	11–3	Nov 2008	ITF Tokyo, Japan	50,000	Hard	(Japan) Ayumi Morita	2–6, 6–2, 3–6
Loss	11–4	Feb 2010	Burnie International, Australia	25,000	Hard	(Russia) Arina Rodionova	1–6, 0–6
Win	12–4	Mar 2010	ITF Sydney, Australia	25,000	Hard	(Japan) Yurika Sema	6–3, 6–3
Win	13–4	Jun 2014	Nottingham Challenge, UK	50,000	Grass	(Switzerland) Timea Bacsinszky	6–2, 6–2
Win	14–4	Aug 2014	Vancouver Open, Canada	100,000	Hard	(Ukraine) Lesia Tsurenko	3–6, 6–2, 7–6^{(3)}

=== Doubles: 19 (10 titles, 9 runner-ups) ===
Result	W–L	Date	Tournament	Tier	Surface	Partner	Opponents	Score
Loss	0–1	Jul 2005	ITF Felixstowe, England	25,000	Grass	(Russia) Alla Kudryavtseva	(New Zealand) Leanne Baker (Italy) Francesca Lubiani	1–6, 6–4, 2–3 ret.
Loss	0–2	Jul 2005	ITF Galatina, Italy	25,000	Clay	(Belarus) Tatiana Poutchek	(Australia) Casey Dellacqua (Australia) Lucia Gonzalez	4–6, 3–6
Win	1–2	Apr 2006	ITF Patras, Greece	25,000	Hard	(Australia) Christina Horiatopoulos	(Bosnia and Herzegovina) Mervana Jugić-Salkić (Ukraine) Yana Levchenko	6–1, 6–4
Win	2–2	Jun 2006	ITF Prostějov, Czech Republic	75,000	Clay	(Japan) Akiko Morigami	(Latvia) Līga Dekmeijere (Poland) Alicja Rosolska	6–3, 7–6^{(3)}
Win	3–2	Aug 2006	ITF Baden-Baden, Germany	50,000	Clay	(Portugal) Frederica Piedade	(Czech Republic) Libuše Průšová (Czech Republic) Barbora Záhlavová-Strýcová	7–5, 4–6, 7–6^{(6)}
Win	4–2	Apr 2008	ITF Incheon, South Korea	25,000	Hard	(Chinese Taipei) Chan Chin-wei	(South Korea) Chang Kyung-mi (South Korea) Lee Jin-a	6–2, 6–0
Win	5–2	May 2008	ITF Gimcheon, South Korea	25,000	Hard	(Chinese Taipei) Chan Chin-wei	(South Korea) Cho Yoon-jeong (South Korea) Kim Jin-hee	6–2, 6–0
Loss	5–3	Sep 2008	ITF Rockhampton, Australia	25,000	Hard	(Sweden) Michaela Johansson	(Japan) Remi Tezuka (China) Zhou Yimiao	6–7^{(2)}, 4–6
Loss	5–4	Oct 2008	ITF Traralgon, Australia	25,000	Hard	(Australia) Jessica Moore	(South Africa) Natalie Grandin (United States) Robin Stephenson	4–6, 2–6
Loss	5–5	Oct 2008	ITF Mildura, Australia	25,000	Grass	(Australia) Jade Hopper	(Australia) Casey Dellacqua (Australia) Jessica Moore	2–6, 6–7^{(3)}
Loss	5–6	Mar 2010	ITF Jersey, England	25,000	Hard	(United Kingdom) Melanie South	(Estonia) Maret Ani (United Kingdom) Anna Smith	5–7, 4–6
Loss	5–7	Nov 2010	ITF Wellington, New Zealand	25,000	Hard	(Australia) Jade Hopper	(Hungary) Tímea Babos (Australia) Tammi Patterson	3–6, 2–6
Loss	5–8	Nov 2010	ITF Traralgon, Australia	25,000	Hard	(Australia) Jade Hopper	(Hungary) Tímea Babos (United Kingdom) Melanie South	3–6, 2–6
Loss	5–9	Nov 2010	Bendigo International, Australia	25,000	Hard	(Australia) Jade Hopper	(Hungary) Tímea Babos (United Kingdom) Melanie South	3–6, 2–6
Win	6–9	Jan 2014	Burnie International, Australia	50,000	Hard	(Australia) Storm Sanders	(Japan) Eri Hozumi (Japan) Miki Miyamura	6–4, 6–4
Win	7–9	Apr 2014	Kangaroo Cup, Japan	75,000	Hard	(Australia) Arina Rodionova	(Japan) Misaki Doi (Chinese Taipei) Hsieh Shu-ying	6–3, 6–3
Win	8–9	May 2014	Kurume Cup, Japan	50,000	Grass	(Australia) Arina Rodionova	(Japan) Junri Namigata (Japan) Akiko Yonemura	6–4, 6–2
Win	9–9	Jun 2014	Nottingham Challenge, UK	50,000	Grass	(Australia) Arina Rodionova	(Croatia) Verónica Cepede Royg (Liechtenstein) Stephanie Vogt	7–6^{(0)}, 6–1
Win	10–9	Apr 2016	ITF Jackson, United States	25,000	Clay	(Canada) Sharon Fichman	(United States) Yuki Kristina Chiang (United States) Lauren Herring	6–2, 6–3

== Top 10 wins ==
Season	2011	...	2015	Total
Wins	2		1	3

#	Player	Rank	Event	Surface	Rd	Score	JWR
2011
1.	(Australia) Samantha Stosur	No. 6	Brisbane International, Australia	Hard	2R	6–2, 6–4	No. 42
2.	(Italy) Francesca Schiavone	No. 4	Fed Cup	Hard	RR	6–7^{(4–7)}, 6–3, 6–3	No. 31
2015
3.	(Germany) Angelique Kerber	No. 10	Fed Cup	Hard	RR	4–6, 6–2, 6–4	No. 54
