= 2008 Guangzhou International Women's Open =

- Date: September 15–21
- Edition: 5th
- Category: Tier III Series
- Draw: 32S / 16D
- Prize money: $175,000
- Surface: Hard - outdoor
- Location: Guangzhou, China

Champions

Singles
- (Russia) Vera Zvonareva

Doubles
- (Ukraine) Mariya Koryttseva / (Belarus) Tatiana Poutchek
- Guangzhou International Women's Open

The 2008 Guangzhou International Women's Open (also known as the TOE Life Ceramics Guangzhou International Women's Open for sponsorship reasons) was a tennis tournament played on outdoor hard courts. It was the 5th edition of the Guangzhou International Women's Open, and was part of the Tier III Series of the 2008 WTA Tour. It took place in Guangzhou, China, from September 15 through September 21, 2008. First-seeded Vera Zvonareva won the singles title.

== Finals ==
=== Singles ===
(Russia) Vera Zvonareva defeated (China) Peng Shuai, 6–7^{(4–7)}, 6–0, 6–2

- It was Zvonareva's 2nd and last singles title of the year and the 7th of her career.

=== Doubles ===
(Ukraine) Mariya Koryttseva / (Belarus) Tatiana Poutchek defeated (China) Sun Tiantian / (China) Yan Zi, 6–3, 4–6, [10–8]
