= Song Shanshan =

Chinese tennis player

- Country (sports): China
- Born: 25 March 1987 (age 39)
- Prize money: $34,038

Singles
- Career record: 59–58
- Career titles: 0
- Highest ranking: No. 278 (1 October 2007)

Doubles
- Career record: 45–39
- Career titles: 6 ITF
- Highest ranking: No. 220 (30 July 2007)

Song Shanshan (born 25 March 1987) is a former professional Chinese tennis player. She won six titles at ITF tournaments, all in doubles.

Song made her WTA Tour main-draw debut at the 2006 Guangzhou International Open where she and Chen Yanchong made the quarterfinals, with a win over future world No. 1 doubles player, Elena Vesnina, and her partner Anna Chakvetadze.

At the 2007 Guangzhou International Open, she qualified for the singles main draw and defeated Chinese wildcard entrant Ji Chunmei in the first round, before being eliminated by fourth seed Dominika Cibulková.

== ITF Circuit finals ==
Legend
$25,000 tournaments
$10,000 tournaments

=== Singles (0–1) ===
Result	No.	Date	Tournament	Surface	Opponent	Score
Loss	1.	20 May 2006	ITF New Delhi, India	Hard	(China) Zhao Yijing	2–6, 2–6

=== Doubles (6–2) ===
Result	No.	Date	Tournament	Surface	Partner	Opponents	Score
Win	1.	13 February 2006	ITF Shenzhen, China	Hard	(China) Liang Chen	(China) Hao Jie (China) Yang Shujing	7–5, 6–1
Win	2.	12 May 2006	ITF New Delhi 3, India	Hard	(China) Zhao Yijing	(India) Rushmi Chakravarthi (India) Archana Venkataraman	6–3, 6–4
Loss	1.	19 May 2006	ITF New Delhi 4, India	Hard	(China) Zhao Yijing	(India) Rushmi Chakravarthi (India) Archana Venkataraman	7–6^{(5)}, 2–6, 4–6
Win	3.	27 February 2007	ITF Wellington, New Zealand	Hard	(Japan) Mari Tanaka	(Japan) Tomoko Dokei (Japan) Etsuko Kitazaki	6–2, 6–0
Win	4.	6 May 2007	ITF Chengdu 1, China	Hard	(Japan) Natsumi Hamamura	(China) Chen Yanchong (China) Liu Wanting	7–5, 4–6, 6–2
Win	5.	12 May 2007	ITF Chengdu 2, China	Hard	(China) Xie Yanze	(China) Xu Yifan (China) Huang Lei	6–3, 7–5
Loss	2.	22 July 2007	Kurume Cup, Japan	Grass	(China) Liu Wanting	(Japan) Ayumi Oka (Japan) Tomoko Sugano	4–6, 1–6
Win	6.	19 August 2007	ITF Tokyo, Japan	Carpet	(China) Zhao Yijing	(Japan) Maiko Inoue (Japan) Mari Inoue	6–3, 6–1
