= Alberta Brianti =

Italian tennis player (born 1980)

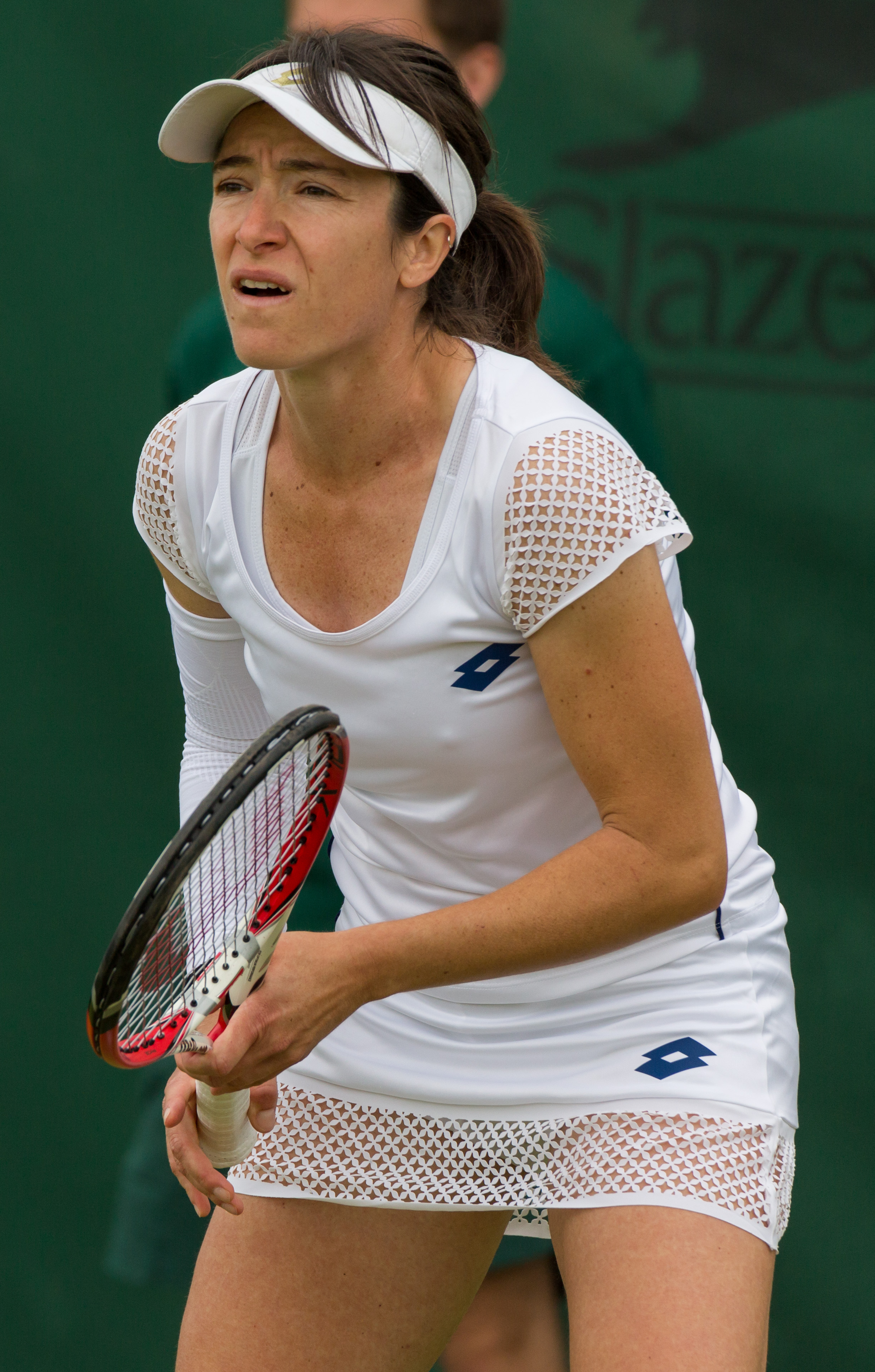
- Brianti in Wimbledon, 2015
- Country (sports): Italy
- Born: 5 April 1980 (age 46) San Secondo Parmense
- Height: 1.65 m (5 ft 5 in)
- Turned pro: 2000
- Retired: 2017
- Plays: Right (one-handed backhand)
- Prize money: $1,263,830

Singles
- Career record: 538–467
- Career titles: 1 WTA, 9 ITF
- Highest ranking: No. 55 (13 June 2011)

Grand Slam singles results
- Australian Open: 3R (2010)
- French Open: 1R (2006, 2007, 2010–2012)
- Wimbledon: 2R (2010)
- US Open: 1R (2007, 2009–2011)

Doubles
- Career record: 155–188
- Career titles: 2 WTA, 11 ITF
- Highest ranking: No. 68 (13 February 2012)

Grand Slam doubles results
- Australian Open: 2R (2012)
- French Open: 2R (2010)
- Wimbledon: 1R (2009, 2010, 2011)
- US Open: 1R (2010, 2011, 2012)

Alberta Brianti (born 5 April 1980) is a former professional tennis player from Italy. On 13 June 2011, Brianti achieved her career-high singles ranking of 55. On 13 February 2012, she peaked at No. 68 in the doubles rankings. She won one singles title on the WTA Tour, defeating Simona Halep in the final at Fes, Morocco, in 2011. Brianti reached one other WTA Tour final at the 2009 Guangzhou Open, which she lost to Shahar Pe'er. Her best performance at a Grand Slam tournament was making it through to the third round at the 2010 Australian Open.

== WTA Tour finals ==
=== Singles: 2 (1–1) ===
Legend Premier International (1–1)	Finals by surface Hard (0–1) Clay (1–0)

Result	W-L	Date	Tournament	Surface	Opponent	Score
Loss	0–1	Sep 2009	Guangzhou Open, China	Hard	(Israel) Shahar Pe'er	6–3, 6–4
Win	1–1	Apr 2011	Morocco Open	Clay	(Romania) Simona Halep	6–4, 6–3

=== Doubles: 4 (2–2) ===
Legend: Before 2009	Legend: Starting in 2009
Tier I	Premier Mandatory
Tier II	Premier 5
Tier III (0–1)	Premier (0–0)
Tier IV & V (0–0)	International (2–1)

Finals by surface
Hard (1–1)
Clay (1–0)

Result	W-L	Date	Tournament	Surface	Partner	Opponents	Score
Loss	0–1	Oct 2007	Kolkata Open, India	Hard	(Ukraine) Mariya Koryttseva	(Russia) Alla Kudryavtseva (United States) Vania King	6–1, 6–4
Win	1–1	Apr 2010	Palermo Ladies Open, Italy	Clay	(Italy) Sara Errani	(United States) Jill Craybas (Germany) Julia Görges	6–4, 6–1
Win	2–1	Aug 2011	Dallas Open, US	Hard	(Romania) Sorana Cîrstea	(France) Alizé Cornet (France) Pauline Parmentier	7–5, 6–3
Loss	2–2	Jul 2012	Baku Cup, Azerbaijan	Hard	(Czech Republic) Eva Birnerová	(Ukraine) Irina Buryachok (Russia) Valeria Solovieva	3–6, 2–6

== ITF Circuit finals ==
Legend
$100,000 tournaments
$75,000 tournaments
$50,000 tournaments
$25,000 tournaments
$10,000 tournaments

=== Singles: 27 (9–18) ===
Result	No.	Date	Tournament	Surface	Opponent	Score
Loss	1.	6 February 2000	Istanbul, Turkey	Hard (i)	(Germany) Caroline Raba	4–6, 4–6
Loss	2.	18 February 2001	Faro, Portugal	Hard	(Japan) Miho Saeki	3–6, 1–6
Win	3.	21 May 2001	Guimarães, Portugal	Clay	(Germany) Sabine Klaschka	6–2, 6–4
Win	4.	20 July 2002	Frinton, UK	Grass	(United Kingdom) Hannah Collin	6–2, 6–4
Win	5.	4 August 2002	Pontevedra, Spain	Hard	(Portugal) Frederica Piedade	6–4, 3–6, 6–0
Win	6.	11 August 2002	Vigo, Spain	Hard	(Portugal) Frederica Piedade	6–2, 7–5
Loss	7.	9 February 2003	Bergamo, Italy	Hard (i)	(Hungary) Virág Németh	5–7, 7–5, 6–7^{(4–7)}
Win	8.	14 March 2004	Rome, Italy	Clay	(Czech Republic) Tereza Veverková	6–4, 4–6, 6–2
Loss	9.	9 October 2005	Nantes, France	Hard (i)	(Germany) Kristina Barrois	4–6, 2–6
Win	10.	26 February 2006	Saint-Georges, Canada	Hard (i)	(Slovakia) Dominika Cibulková	6–4, 6–2
Loss	11.	5 March 2006	Clearwater, United States	Hard	(Argentina) Clarisa Fernández	5–7, 2–6
Win	12.	25 March 2006	Saint Petersburg, Russia	Hard (i)	(Russia) Alla Kudryavtseva	6–1, 6–4
Loss	13.	9 April 2006	Putignano, Italy	Hard	(Switzerland) Romina Oprandi	1–6, 6–1, 4–6
Loss	14.	19 November 2006	Deauville, France	Clay	(Ukraine) Viktoriya Kutuzova	1–6, 2–6
Loss	15.	4 February 2007	Ortisei, Italy	Carpet (i)	(Denmark) Caroline Wozniacki	6–4, 5–7, 3–6
Win	16.	21 October 2007	Saint-Raphaël, France	Hard (i)	(France) Stéphanie Foretz	6–4, 6–4
Loss	17.	19 April 2008	Bari, Italy	Clay	(Netherlands) Arantxa Rus	6–2, 5–7, 3–6
Loss	18.	7 October 2008	Barnstaple, UK	Hard (i)	(United Kingdom) Anne Keothavong	4–6, 2–6
Loss	19.	26 October 2008	Saguenay, Canada	Hard (i)	(United States) Alexa Glatch	3–6, 1–6
Win	20	28 September 2010	Ningbo, China	Hard	(Slovakia) Magdaléna Rybáriková	6–4, 6–4
Loss	21.	7 July 2013	Denain, France	Clay	(Brazil) Teliana Pereira	4–6, 5–7
Loss	22.	18 August 2013	Craiova, Romania	Clay	(Slovakia) Kristína Kučová	5–7, 6–3, 4–6
Loss	23.	30 September 2013	Budapest, Hungary	Clay	(Czech Republic) Kateřina Siniaková	6–3, 2–6, 1–6
Loss	24.	13 October 2013	Sant Cugat, Spain	Clay	(Netherlands) Arantxa Rus	4–6, 6–2, 2–6
Loss	25.	8 September 2014	Saint-Malo, France	Clay	(Germany) Carina Witthöft	0–6, 1–6
Loss	26.	9 November 2014	Bath, UK	Hard (i)	(Liechtenstein) Stephanie Vogt	3–6, 6–7^{(3–7)}
Loss	27.	27 August 2017	Caslano, Switzerland	Clay	(Switzerland) Karin Kennel	3–6, 0–6

=== Doubles: 17 (11–6) ===
Result	No.	Date	Tournament	Surface	Partner	Opponents	Score
Win	1.	27 July 1998	Catania, Italy	Clay	(Italy) Chiara Dalbon	(Austria) Sandra Mantler (New Zealand) Shelley Stephens	6–3, 6–4
Win	2.	9 August 1998	Catania, Italy	Clay	(Italy) Chiara Dalbon	(Argentina) Bettina Fulco (Argentina) Jorgelina Torti	7–5, 6–4
Loss	3.	24 July 2000	Camaiore, Italy	Clay	(Italy) Giulia Meruzzi	(Argentina) Eugenia Chialvo (Argentina) Jorgelina Cravero	2–6, 1–6
Loss	4.	23 June 2002	Montemor-o-Novo, Portugal	Hard	(Portugal) Frederica Piedade	(Portugal) Carlota Santos (Portugal) Neuza Silva	4–6, 2–6
Win	5.	20 July 2002	Frinton, UK	Grass	(Australia) Michelle Summerside	(Russia) Irina Bulykina (Israel) Evgenia Linetskaya	6–3, 6–4
Loss	6.	4 August 2002	Pontevedra, Spain	Hard	(Turkey) İpek Şenoğlu	(Portugal) Neuza Silva (Portugal) Frederica Piedade	2–6, 6–4, 2–6
Win	7.	25 January 2004	Bergamo, Italy	Carpet (i)	(France) Kildine Chevalier	(Croatia) Iva Majoli (Croatia) Sanda Mamić	6–4, 6–4
Win	8.	13 March 2005	Naples, Italy	Clay	(Austria) Stefanie Haidner	(Italy) Anna Floris (Italy) Giulia Meruzzi	6–4, 6–3
Win	9.	7 May 2005	Catania, Italy	Clay	(Italy) Giulia Casoni	(Italy) Giulia Gabba (Italy) Valentina Sulpizio	6–3, 6–3
Win	10.	19 February 2006	Saguenay, Canada	Hard (i)	(Italy) Giulia Casoni	(United States) Raquel Atawo (United States) Aleke Tsoubanos	6–4, 7–6^{(4)}
Win	11.	26 February 2006	Saint-Georges, Canada	Hard (i)	(Italy) Giulia Casoni	(Czech Republic) Veronika Chvojková (Slovakia) Dominika Cibulková	6–2, 3–6, 6–1
Loss	12.	4 March 2007	Las Vegas, United States	Hard	(Estonia) Maret Ani	(Belarus) Victoria Azarenka (Belarus) Tatiana Poutchek	2–6, 4–6
Win	13.	19 April 2008	Bari, Italy	Clay	(Italy) Anna Floris	(Liechtenstein) Stephanie Vogt (Slovenia) Polona Hercog	6–3, 6–3
Win	14.	8 September 2008	Sarajevo, Bosnia and Herzegovina	Clay	(Slovenia) Polona Hercog	(Turkey) Çağla Büyükakçay (Israel) Julia Glushko	6–4, 7–5
Win	15.	5 April 2009	Latina, Italy	Clay	(Germany) Julia Schruff	(Russia) Marina Shamayko (Italy) Emily Stellato	6–1, 6–4
Loss	16.	6 April 2009	Monzón, Spain	Hard	(Georgia (country)) Margalita Chakhnashvili	(Chinese Taipei) Chen Yi (Russia) Vesna Manasieva	6–2, 4–6, [8–10]
Loss	17.	19 October 2014	Joué-lès-Tours, France	Hard (i)	(Italy) Maria Elena Camerin	(France) Stéphanie Foretz (France) Amandine Hesse	def.

== Grand Slam performance timelines ==
Key
W	F	SF	QF	#R	RR	Q#	DNQ	A	NH

(W) winner; (F) finalist; (SF) semifinalist; (QF) quarterfinalist; (#R) rounds 4, 3, 2, 1; (RR) round-robin stage; (Q#) qualification round; (DNQ) did not qualify; (A) absent; (NH) not held; (SR) strike rate (events won / competed); (W–L) win–loss record.

=== Singles ===
Tournament	2006	2007	2008	2009	2010	2011	2012	2013	2014	2015	2016	W–L
Australian Open	A	1R	Q1	2R	3R	2R	2R	A	Q1	Q2	A	5–5
French Open	1R	1R	A	Q2	1R	1R	1R	A	Q2	Q2	A	0–5
Wimbledon	Q1	1R	Q1	1R	2R	1R	1R	A	Q2	Q1	A	1–5
US Open	Q2	1R	Q2	1R	1R	1R	Q1	A	Q2	Q1	A	0–4
Win–loss	0–1	0–4	0–0	1–3	3–4	1–4	1–3	0–0	0–0	0–0	0–0	6–19

=== Doubles ===
Tournament	2007	2010	2011	2012	W–L
Australian Open	A	1R	1R	2R	1–3
French Open	1R	2R	1R	1R	1–4
Wimbledon	A	1R	1R	A	0–2
US Open	A	1R	1R	A	0–2
Win–loss	0–1	1–3	0–4	1–3	2–11
