= 2023 Guangzhou Open =

- Date: September 18–23
- Edition: 17th
- Category: WTA 250
- Draw: 32S / 16D
- Prize money: $259,303
- Surface: Hard
- Location: Guangzhou, China
- Venue: Nansha International Tennis Center

Champions

Singles
- (China) Wang Xiyu

Doubles
- (China) Guo Hanyu / (China) Jiang Xinyu
| ← 2019 · | Guangzhou Open | · 2024 → |

The 2023 Guangzhou Open (also known as the Galaxy Holding Group Guangzhou Open for sponsorship reasons) was a professional women's tennis tournament played on outdoor hard courts. It was the 17th edition of the Guangzhou Open (the first since 2019), and part of the WTA 250 tournaments of the 2023 WTA Tour. It took place at the Nansha International Tennis Center in Guangzhou, China, from 18 September through 23 September, 2023. Unseeded Wang Xiyu won the singles title.

== Finals ==
=== Singles ===
- (China) Wang Xiyu defeated (Poland) Magda Linette 6–0, 6–2

=== Doubles ===
- (China) Guo Hanyu / (China) Jiang Xinyu defeated (Japan) Eri Hozumi / (Japan) Makoto Ninomiya 6–3, 7–6^{(7–4)}

== Singles main-draw entrants ==
=== Seeds ===
| Country | Player | Rank^{1} | Seed |
|---|---|---|---|
| POL | Magda Linette | 24 | 1 |
| ~~CHN~~ | ~~Zhu Lin~~ | ~~35~~ | ~~2~~ |
| GER | Tatjana Maria | 48 | 3 |
| ITA | Lucia Bronzetti | 60 | 4 |
| ESP | Rebeka Masarova | 65 | 5 |
| CZE | Linda Fruhvirtová | 68 | 6 |
| BEL | Greet Minnen | 69 | 7 |
| USA | Claire Liu | 70 | 8 |

- ^{1} Rankings are as of 11 September 2023

=== Other entrants ===
The following players received wildcards into the singles main draw:

- (China) Bai Zhuoxuan
- (China) You Xiaodi
- (China) Yuan Yue

The following player received entry using a protected ranking:

- (Australia) Daria Saville

The following players received entry from the qualifying draw:

- (United Kingdom) Harriet Dart
- (Philippines) Alexandra Eala
- (Switzerland) Viktorija Golubic
- (Greece) Despina Papamichail
- (Japan) Moyuka Uchijima
- (Chinese Taipei) Yang Ya-yi

The following players received entry as lucky losers:

- (Slovakia) Viktória Hrunčáková
- (France) Jessika Ponchet

=== Withdrawals ===
- (United Kingdom) Katie Boulter → replaced by (Denmark) Clara Tauson
- (Romania) Sorana Cîrstea → replaced by (United Kingdom) Jodie Burrage
- (China) Wang Xinyu → replaced by (France) Jessika Ponchet
- (China) Zhu Lin → replaced by (Slovakia) Viktória Hrunčáková

== Doubles main-draw entrants ==
=== Seeds ===
| Country | Player | Country | Player | Rank^{1} | Seed |
|---|---|---|---|---|---|
| USA | Sabrina Santamaria | | Yana Sizikova | 118 | 1 |
| JPN | Eri Hozumi | JPN | Makoto Ninomiya | 139 | 2 |
| CZE | Anastasia Dețiuc | POL | Katarzyna Piter | 152 | 3 |
| POL | Magda Linette | JPN | Moyuka Uchijima | 194 | 4 |

- ^{1} Rankings are as of 11 September 2023

=== Other entrants ===
The following pairs received wildcards into the doubles main draw:

- (China) Feng Shuo / (China) Tang Qianhui
- (China) Guo Hanyu / (China) Jiang Xinyu
