= 2024 Guangzhou Open – Doubles =

Doubles
- 2024 Guangzhou Open

Final
- Champions: (Czech Republic) Kateřina Siniaková (China) Zhang Shuai
- Runners-up: (Poland) Katarzyna Piter (Hungary) Fanny Stollár
- Score: 6–4, 6–1

Details
- Draw: 16
- Seeds: 4

Events
| Singles | Doubles |
| ← 2023 · | Guangzhou Open | · 2025 → |

Kateřina Siniaková and Zhang Shuai defeated Katarzyna Piter and Fanny Stollár in the final, 6–4, 6–1 to win the doubles tennis title at the 2024 Guangzhou Open. They did not lose a set en route to the title.

Guo Hanyu and Jiang Xinyu were the reigning champions, but Guo chose not to participate this year and Jiang chose to compete in Tokyo instead.

== Seeds ==
1. (Czech Republic) Kateřina Siniaková / (China) Zhang Shuai (champions)
2. (Indonesia) Aldila Sutjiadi / (China) Xu Yifan (withdrew)
3. (Norway) Ulrikke Eikeri / (Japan) Makoto Ninomiya (quarterfinals)
4. (Hungary) Tímea Babos / (United Kingdom) Harriet Dart (first round)

== Draw ==
=== Key ===
- Q = Qualifier
- WC = Wild card
- LL = Lucky loser
- Alt = Alternate
- ITF = ITF entry
- PR = Protected ranking
- SR = Special ranking
- SE = Special exempt
- JE = Junior exempt
- JR = Junior Accelerator Programme entrant
- CO = College Accelerator Programme entrant
- NG = Next Gen Accelerator Program entrant
- w/o = Walkover
- r = Retired
- d = Defaulted

=== Draw ===
First round
1 | (Czech Republic) K Siniaková (China) S Zhang | 6 | 6
WC | (China) L Liu (China) Z Ni Ma | 0 | 1
WC | (China) S Feng (China) Z Yang | 6 | 6
Alt | M Betova; E Pridankina | 0 | 4
4 | (Hungary) T Babos (United Kingdom) H Dart | 3 | 7^{7} | [5]
(Hungary) A Bondár (Belgium) K Zimmermann | 6 | 6^{5} | [10]
(Italy) A Moratelli (Czech Republic) A Sisková | 6 | 7^{7}
(United Kingdom) S Murray Sharan (United Kingdom) E Silva | 1 | 6^{3}
(Italy) L Bronzetti (Switzerland) V Golubic | 4 | 4
(United Kingdom) E Appleton (China) Q Tang | 6 | 6
(Spain) Y Cavallé Reimers (Netherlands) A Rus | 3 | 6^{4}
3 | (Norway) U Eikeri (Japan) M Ninomiya | 6 | 7^{7}
Alt | (Croatia) J Fett (France) J Ponchet | 7 | 6
(Czech Republic) A Dețiuc (United States) S Santamaria | 5 | 4
(Poland) K Piter (Hungary) F Stollár | 6 | 3 | [10]
Alt | (Germany) E Seidel (Liechtenstein) K von Deichmann | 2 | 6 | [5]

Quarterfinals
1 | (Czech Republic) K Siniaková (China) S Zhang | 6 | 6
WC | (China) S Feng (China) Z Yang | 1 | 2
(Hungary) A Bondár (Belgium) K Zimmermann | 6 | 5 | [11]
(Italy) A Moratelli (Czech Republic) A Sisková | 3 | 7 | [9]
(United Kingdom) E Appleton (China) Q Tang | 1 | 6 | [10]
3 | (Norway) U Eikeri (Japan) M Ninomiya | 6 | 3 | [4]
Alt | (Croatia) J Fett (France) J Ponchet | 6^{3} | 2
(Poland) K Piter (Hungary) F Stollár | 7^{7} | 6

Semifinals
1 | (Czech Republic) K Siniaková (China) S Zhang | 6 | 6
(Hungary) A Bondár (Belgium) K Zimmermann | 3 | 1
(United Kingdom) E Appleton (China) Q Tang | 5 | 3
(Poland) K Piter (Hungary) F Stollár | 7 | 6

Final
1 | (Czech Republic) K Siniaková (China) S Zhang | 6 | 6
(Poland) K Piter (Hungary) F Stollár | 4 | 1
