= 2024 Guangzhou Open =

- Date: October 21–27
- Edition: 18th
- Category: WTA 250
- Draw: 32S / 16D
- Surface: Hard / outdoor
- Location: Guangzhou, China
- Venue: Nansha International Tennis Center

Champions

Singles
- (Serbia) Olga Danilović

Doubles
- (Czech Republic) Kateřina Siniaková / (China) Zhang Shuai
← 2023 ·	Guangzhou Open	· 2025 →

The 2024 Guangzhou Open (known as the Guangzhou Open presented by AVATR for sponsorship reasons) was a professional women's tennis tournament played on outdoor hardcourts. It was the 18th edition of the Guangzhou Open, and part of the WTA 250 tournaments of the 2024 WTA Tour. It took place at the Nansha International Tennis Center in Guangzhou, China, from 21 October through 27 October, 2024. Unseeded Olga Danilović won the singles title.

== Finals ==
=== Singles ===
- (Serbia) Olga Danilović defeated (United States) Caroline Dolehide 6–3, 6–1

=== Doubles ===
- (Czech Republic) Kateřina Siniaková / (China) Zhang Shuai defeated (Poland) Katarzyna Piter / (Hungary) Fanny Stollár 6–4, 6–1

== Singles main-draw entrants ==
=== Seeds ===
Country	Player	Rank^{1}	Seed
CZE	Kateřina Siniaková	41	1
CZE	Marie Bouzková	43	2
CHN	Yuan Yue	46	3
ARM	Elina Avanesyan	48	4
FRA	Diane Parry	52	5
SVK	Rebecca Šramková	53	6
ESP	Jéssica Bouzas Maneiro	62	7
	Kamilla Rakhimova	65	8

- ^{1} Rankings are as of 14 October 2024

=== Other entrants ===
The following players received wildcards into the singles main draw:

- (China) Shi Han
- (China) Wei Sijia
- (China) Zhang Shuai

The following player received entry into the singles main draw as a special exempt:

- (Netherlands) Suzan Lamens

The following players received entry from the qualifying draw:

- (United States) Caroline Dolehide
- (Philippines) Alexandra Eala
- (Croatia) Jana Fett
- (Croatia) Petra Martić
- (France) Jessika Ponchet
- (Thailand) Mananchaya Sawangkaew

The following players received entry as lucky losers:

- (United States) Emina Bektas
- (United States) Alycia Parks
- Elena Pridankina
- (Germany) Ella Seidel

=== Withdrawals ===
- (United Kingdom) Harriet Dart → replaced by Elena Pridankina
- (Ukraine) Anhelina Kalinina → replaced by (Germany) Ella Seidel
- (Poland) Magda Linette → replaced by (United States) Emina Bektas
- Anastasia Potapova → replaced by (Belgium) Greet Minnen
- (Kazakhstan) Yulia Putintseva → replaced by (United States) Bernarda Pera
- (United Kingdom) Emma Raducanu → replaced by (Hungary) Anna Bondár
- (United States) Sloane Stephens → replaced by (Switzerland) Viktorija Golubic
- (United States) Katie Volynets → replaced by (United States) Alycia Parks
- (China) Wang Yafan → replaced by (China) Wang Xiyu
- (Ukraine) Dayana Yastremska → replaced by (Netherlands) Arantxa Rus

== Doubles main-draw entrants ==
=== Seeds ===
Country	Player	Country	Player	Rank^{1}	Seed
CZE	Kateřina Siniaková	CHN	Zhang Shuai	31	1
~~INA~~	~~Aldila Sutjiadi~~	~~CHN~~	~~Xu Yifan~~	~~81~~	~~2~~
NOR	Ulrikke Eikeri	JPN	Makoto Ninomiya	99	3
HUN	Tímea Babos	GBR	Harriet Dart	111	4

- ^{1} Rankings are as of 14 October 2024

=== Other entrants ===
The following pairs received wildcards into the doubles main draw:

- (China) Liu Leyi / (China) Ni Ma Zhuoma
- (China) Feng Shuo / (China) Yang Zhaoxuan

The following pairs received entry as alternates:

- Margarita Betova / Elena Pridankina
- (Croatia) Jana Fett / (France) Jessika Ponchet
- (Germany) Ella Seidel / (Liechtenstein) Kathinka von Deichmann

=== Withdrawals ===
- (Spain) Jéssica Bouzas Maneiro / (Serbia) Olga Danilović → replaced by Margarita Betova / Elena Pridankina
- (Australia) Olivia Gadecki / Kamilla Rakhimova → replaced by (Croatia) Jana Fett / (France) Jessika Ponchet
- (Indonesia) Aldila Sutjiadi / (China) Xu Yifan → replaced by (Germany) Ella Seidel / (Liechtenstein) Kathinka von Deichmann
