= 2025 Guangzhou Open =

- Date: October 20–26
- Edition: 19th
- Category: WTA 250
- Draw: 32S / 16D
- Prize money: $275,094
- Surface: Hard / outdoor
- Location: Guangzhou, China
- Venue: Nansha International Tennis Center

Champions

Singles
- (United States) Ann Li

Doubles
- (Poland) Katarzyna Piter / (Indonesia) Janice Tjen
← 2024 ·	Guangzhou Open	· 2026 →

The 2025 Guangzhou Open was a professional women's tennis tournament played on outdoor hardcourts. It was the 19th edition of the Guangzhou Open, and part of the WTA 250 tournaments of the 2025 WTA Tour. It took place at the Nansha International Tennis Center in Guangzhou, China, from 20 October through 26 October, 2025.

== Finals ==
=== Singles ===
- (United States) Ann Li def. (New Zealand) Lulu Sun 7–6^{(8–6)}, 6–2

=== Doubles ===
- (Poland) Katarzyna Piter / (Indonesia) Janice Tjen def. (Hong Kong) Eudice Chong / (Chinese Taipei) Liang En-shuo 3–6, 6–3, [10–5]

== Singles main-draw entrants ==
=== Seeds ===
Country	Player	Rank^{1}	Seed
ESP	Jéssica Bouzas Maneiro	40	1
USA	Ann Li	42	2
GER	Tatjana Maria	43	3
PHI	Alexandra Eala	54	4
USA	Alycia Parks	66	5
KAZ	Yulia Putintseva	69	6
GBR	Francesca Jones	74	7
	Polina Kudermetova	75	8

- ^{1} Rankings are as of 13 October 2025

=== Other entrants ===
The following players received wildcards into the singles main draw:

- (China) Guo Hanyu
- (China) Wang Xiyu
- (China) Wang Yafan
- (China) Zhang Shuai

The following player received entry using a protected ranking:

- ~~(China) Zhu Lin~~

The following players received entry from the qualifying draw:

- (Slovenia) Kaja Juvan
- (Poland) Katarzyna Kawa
- Alina Korneeva
- (United States) Claire Liu
- (New Zealand) Lulu Sun
- (United States) Katie Volynets

The following players received entry as lucky losers:

- (Andorra) Victoria Jiménez Kasintseva
- (France) Tiantsoa Rakotomanga Rajaonah

=== Withdrawals ===
- (United Kingdom) Sonay Kartal → replaced by (France) Léolia Jeanjean
- (Czech Republic) Tereza Valentová → replaced by (Andorra) Victoria Jiménez Kasintseva
- (Croatia) Donna Vekić → replaced by (Australia) Ajla Tomljanović
- (China) Zhu Lin → replaced by (France) Tiantsoa Rakotomanga Rajaonah

== Doubles main-draw entrants ==
=== Seeds ===
Country	Player	Country	Player	Rank^{1}	Seed
USA	Quinn Gleason		Elena Pridankina	147	1
NED	Isabelle Haverlag	GBR	Maia Lumsden	156	2
ROU	Monica Niculescu	USA	Sabrina Santamaria	157	3
GBR	Emily Appleton	CHN	Tang Qianhui	158	4

- ^{1} Rankings are as of 13 October 2025

=== Other entrants ===
The following pairs received wildcards into the doubles main draw:

- (China) Fanshi Song / (China) Qu Shutong
- (France) Léolia Jeanjean / (France) Kristina Mladenovic

The following pairs received entry as alternates:

- (Italy) Lucia Bronzetti / (Italy) Elisabetta Cocciaretto
- (Czech Republic) Dominika Šalková / (Germany) Ella Seidel

=== Withdrawals ===
- (Hungary) Anna Bondár / (Slovenia) Veronika Erjavec → replaced by (Czech Republic) Dominika Šalková / (Germany) Ella Seidel
- (China) Feng Shuo / (China) Yang Zhaoxuan → replaced by (Italy) Lucia Bronzetti / (Italy) Elisabetta Cocciaretto
