= 2025 Guangzhou Open – Singles =

Singles
- 2025 Guangzhou Open

Final
- Champion: (United States) Ann Li
- Runner-up: (New Zealand) Lulu Sun
- Score: 7–6^{(8–6)}, 6–2

Details
- Draw: 32 (6 Q / 4 WC)
- Seeds: 8

Events
Singles	Doubles
- Guangzhou Open

Ann Li defeated Lulu Sun in the final, 7–6^{(8–6)}, 6–2 to win the singles tennis title at the 2025 Guangzhou Open. She did not drop a set en route to her second WTA Tour title, and first since 2021.

Olga Danilović was the reigning champion, but did not participate this year.

== Seeds ==
1. (Spain) Jéssica Bouzas Maneiro (first round)
2. (United States) Ann Li (champion)
3. (Germany) Tatjana Maria (first round)
4. (Philippines) Alexandra Eala (first round)
5. (United States) Alycia Parks (first round)
6. (Kazakhstan) Yulia Putintseva (second round)
7. (United Kingdom) Francesca Jones (first round)
8. Polina Kudermetova (first round)

== Draw ==
Key

- Q = Qualifier
- WC = Wild card
- LL = Lucky loser
- Alt = Alternate
- ITF = ITF entry
- PR = Protected ranking
- SR = Special ranking
- SE = Special exempt
- JE = Junior exempt
- JR = Junior Accelerator Programme entrant
- CO = College Accelerator Programme entrant
- NG = Next Gen Accelerator Program entrant
- w/o = Walkover
- r = Retired
- d = Defaulted

=== Finals ===
Semifinals
Q	(New Zealand) Lulu Sun	6	7^{7}
Q	(United States) Claire Liu	0	6^{3}
WC	(China) Zhang Shuai	2^{r}
2	(United States) Ann Li	5

Final
Q	(New Zealand) Lulu Sun	6^{6}	2
2	(United States) Ann Li	7^{8}	6

=== Top half ===
First round
1	(Spain) J Bouzas Maneiro	6^{3}	6^{2}
Q	(New Zealand) L Sun	7^{7}	7^{7}
WC	(China) Y Wang	6	6
K Rakhimova	2	4
Q	(Slovenia) K Juvan	3	6	3
(United States) C McNally	6	1	6
(Australia) A Tomljanović	7	7
5	(United States) A Parks	5	5
4	(Philippines) A Eala	6	4	4
Q	(United States) C Liu	2	6	6
(Hungary) A Bondár	6	3	7^{7}
WC	(China) H Guo	3	6	6^{4}
(Germany) E Seidel	6	6
(France) L Jeanjean	2	2
Q	A Korneeva	6^{2}	6	4
6	(Kazakhstan) Y Putintseva	7^{7}	4	6

Second round
Q	(New Zealand) L Sun	6	6
WC	(China) Y Wang	3	1
(United States) C McNally	6	4	6
(Australia) A Tomljanović	4	6	3
Q	(United States) C Liu	6	6
(Hungary) A Bondár	3	4
(Germany) E Seidel	6	6
6	(Kazakhstan) Y Putintseva	3	2

Quarterfinals
Q	(New Zealand) L Sun	3	6	6
(United States) C McNally	6	3	4
Q	(United States) C Liu	4	6	6
(Germany) E Seidel	6	0	4

Semifinals
Q	(New Zealand) L Sun	6	7^{7}
Q	(United States) C Liu	0	6^{3}

=== Bottom half ===
First round
8	P Kudermetova	6	1	2
LL	(France) T Rakotomanga Rajaonah	1	6	6
Q	(Poland) K Kawa	6	2	2
Q	(United States) K Volynets	4	6	6
WC	(China) S Zhang	6	6
A Zakharova	4	1
(Slovenia) V Erjavec	6	6^{7}	6
3	(Germany) T Maria	4	7^{9}	2
7	(United Kingdom) F Jones	4	4
WC	(China) Xiy Wang	6	6
(Italy) E Cocciaretto	6	6^{7}	6
(France) D Parry	4	7^{9}	2
(Colombia) C Osorio	6	6
(Italy) L Bronzetti	1	2
LL	(Andorra) V Jiménez Kasintseva	4	6^{4}
2	(United States) A Li	6	7^{7}

Second round
LL	(France) T Rakotomanga Rajaonah	3	3
Q	(United States) K Volynets	6	6
WC	(China) S Zhang	3	6	6
(Slovenia) V Erjavec	6	3	2
WC	(China) Xiy Wang	3	6	3
(Italy) E Cocciaretto	6	2	6
(Colombia) C Osorio	5	2
2	(United States) A Li	7	6

Quarterfinals
Q	(United States) K Volynets	6^{5}	7	5
WC	(China) S Zhang	7^{7}	5	7
(Italy) E Cocciaretto	3	4
2	(United States) A Li	6	6

Semifinals
WC	(China) S Zhang	2^{r}
2	(United States) A Li	5

== Qualifying ==
=== Seeds ===
1. (United States) Katie Volynets (qualified)
2. (Indonesia) Janice Tjen (first round)
3. (Slovenia) Kaja Juvan (qualified)
4. (Andorra) Victoria Jiménez Kasintseva (qualifying competition, lucky loser)
5. (Poland) Katarzyna Kawa (qualified)
6. (New Zealand) Lulu Sun (qualified)
7. (France) Tiantsoa Rakotomanga Rajaonah (qualifying competition, lucky loser)
8. (Australia) Talia Gibson (first round)
9. (Chinese Taipei) Joanna Garland (first round)
10. (Czech Republic) Linda Fruhvirtová (first round)
11. (United States) Whitney Osuigwe (first round)
12. (Germany) Tamara Korpatsch (qualifying competition)

=== Qualifiers ===
1. (United States) Katie Volynets
2. Alina Korneeva
3. (Slovenia) Kaja Juvan
4. (United States) Claire Liu
5. (Poland) Katarzyna Kawa
6. (New Zealand) Lulu Sun

=== Lucky losers ===
1. (France) Tiantsoa Rakotomanga Rajaonah
2. (Andorra) Victoria Jiménez Kasintseva

=== Qualifying draw ===
==== First qualifier ====
First round
1	(United States) Katie Volynets	6	7
(Czech Republic) Dominika Šalková	2	5
(Thailand) Lanlana Tararudee	7	6
9	(Chinese Taipei) Joanna Garland	5	4

Qualifying competition
1	(United States) Katie Volynets	6	4	6
(Thailand) Lanlana Tararudee	2	6	4

==== Second qualifier ====
First round
2	(Indonesia) Janice Tjen	7^{7}	4	6^{4}
Tatiana Prozorova	6^{4}	6	7^{7}
Alina Korneeva	5	6	7
8	(Australia) Talia Gibson	7	3	5

Qualifying competition
Tatiana Prozorova	1	3
Alina Korneeva	6	6

==== Third qualifier ====
First round
3	(Slovenia) Kaja Juvan	7	6
WC	(China) Anna Yang	5	2
(China) Wei Sijia	7^{7}	0	0^{r}
12	(Germany) Tamara Korpatsch	6^{5}	6	2

Qualifying competition
3	(Slovenia) Kaja Juvan	6	3	7
12	(Germany) Tamara Korpatsch	2	6	5

==== Fourth qualifier ====
First round
4	(Andorra) Victoria Jiménez Kasintseva	6	6
WC	(China) Shi Han	2	1
(United States) Claire Liu	7^{7}	6
10	(Czech Republic) Linda Fruhvirtová	6^{5}	4

Qualifying competition
4	(Andorra) Victoria Jiménez Kasintseva	7	3	4
(United States) Claire Liu	5	6	6

==== Fifth qualifier ====
First round
5	(Poland) Katarzyna Kawa	0	6	7
(China) Gao Xinyu	6	4	5
WC	(Hong Kong) Cody Wong	3	6	7
11	(United States) Whitney Osuigwe	6	3	5

Qualifying competition
5	(Poland) Katarzyna Kawa	5	7^{7}	6
WC	(Hong Kong) Cody Wong	7	6^{5}	4

==== Sixth qualifier ====
First round
6	(New Zealand) Lulu Sun	6	6
WC	(China) Li Yuyao	4	0
(Australia) Astra Sharma	5^{r}
7	(France) Tiantsoa Rakotomanga Rajaonah	6

Qualifying competition
6	(New Zealand) Lulu Sun	6	6
7	(France) Tiantsoa Rakotomanga Rajaonah	2	2
