= 2024 Guangzhou Open – Singles =

Singles
- 2024 Guangzhou Open

Final
- Champion: (Serbia) Olga Danilović
- Runner-up: (United States) Caroline Dolehide
- Score: 6–3, 6–1

Details
- Draw: 32 (6 Q / 3 WC )
- Seeds: 8

Events
Singles	Doubles
- Guangzhou Open

Olga Danilović defeated Caroline Dolehide in the final, 6–3, 6–1 to win the singles title at the 2024 Guangzhou Open. It was her second WTA Tour singles title and first since 2018.

Wang Xiyu was the defending champion, but lost to Lucia Bronzetti in the quarterfinals.

== Seeds ==
1. (Czech Republic) Kateřina Siniaková (semifinals, retired)
2. (Czech Republic) Marie Bouzková (second round)
3. (China) Yuan Yue (second round)
4. (Armenia) Elina Avanesyan (first round)
5. (France) Diane Parry (second round)
6. (Slovakia) Rebecca Šramková (first round)
7. (Spain) Jéssica Bouzas Maneiro (quarterfinals)
8. Kamilla Rakhimova (first round)

== Draw ==
Key

- Q = Qualifier
- WC = Wild card
- LL = Lucky loser
- Alt = Alternate
- ITF = ITF entry
- PR = Protected ranking
- SR = Special ranking
- SE = Special exempt
- JE = Junior exempt
- JR = Junior Accelerator Programme entrant
- CO = College Accelerator Programme entrant
- NG = Next Gen Accelerator Program entrant
- w/o = Walkover
- r = Retired
- d = Defaulted

=== Finals ===
Semifinals
1	(Czech Republic) Kateřina Siniaková	6	4	3^{r}
(Serbia) Olga Danilović	4	6	4
(Italy) Lucia Bronzetti	3	6	6^{9}
Q	(United States) Caroline Dolehide	6	3	7^{11}

Final
(Serbia) Olga Danilović	6	6
Q	(United States) Caroline Dolehide	3	1

=== Top half ===
First round
1	(Czech Republic) K Siniaková	6	6
Q	(Croatia) P Martić	2	1
(Hungary) A Bondár	3	3
LL	(United States) A Parks	6	6
Q	(Philippines) A Eala	0	3
(United States) B Pera	6	6
WC	(China) S Zhang	6	6
8	K Rakhimova	2	1
3	(China) Y Yuan	7^{7}	6
(Belgium) G Minnen	6^{2}	1
LL	(Germany) E Seidel	1	6	2
Q	(Thailand) M Sawangkaew	6	2	6
(Serbia) O Danilović	6	6
E Andreeva	4	4
LL	(United States) E Bektas	3	2
5	(France) D Parry	6	6

Second round
1	(Czech Republic) K Siniaková	6	6
LL	(United States) A Parks	1	4
(United States) B Pera	6	6
WC	(China) S Zhang	2	2
3	(China) Y Yuan	2	3
Q	(Thailand) M Sawangkaew	6	6
(Serbia) O Danilović	6	6
5	(France) D Parry	1	0

Quarterfinals
1	(Czech Republic) K Siniaková	6	7
(United States) B Pera	4	5
Q	(Thailand) M Sawangkaew	4	4
(Serbia) O Danilović	6	6

Semifinals
1	(Czech Republic) K Siniaková	6	4	3^{r}
(Serbia) O Danilović	4	6	4

=== Bottom half ===
First round
6	(Slovakia) R Šramková	1	4
WC	(China) S Wei	6	6
(China) Xiy Wang	6	6
(Netherlands) A Rus	2	4
(Switzerland) V Golubic	4	6	1
(Romania) J Cristian	6	2	6
(Italy) L Bronzetti	6	6
4	(Armenia) E Avanesyan	1	4
7	(Spain) J Bouzas Maneiro	6	6
Q	(Croatia) J Fett	4	3
WC	(China) H Shi	6	6^{4}	6
Q	(France) J Ponchet	1	7^{7}	3
LL	E Pridankina	2	1
Q	(United States) C Dolehide	6	6
SE	(Netherlands) S Lamens	3	1
2	(Czech Republic) M Bouzková	6	6

Second round
WC	(China) S Wei	6	0	5
(China) Xiy Wang	3	6	7
(Romania) J Cristian	6^{5}	4
(Italy) L Bronzetti	7^{7}	6
7	(Spain) J Bouzas Maneiro	6	6
WC	(China) H Shi	3	4
Q	(United States) C Dolehide	6^{3}	6	7^{8}
2	(Czech Republic) M Bouzková	7^{7}	4	6^{6}

Quarterfinals
(China) Xiy Wang	4	1
(Italy) L Bronzetti	6	6
7	(Spain) J Bouzas Maneiro	4	6	0
Q	(United States) C Dolehide	6	4	6

Semifinals
(Italy) L Bronzetti	3	6	6^{9}
Q	(United States) C Dolehide	6	3	7^{11}

== Qualifying ==
=== Seeds ===
1. (Ukraine) Yuliia Starodubtseva (first round)
2. (United States) Caroline Dolehide (qualified)
3. (Croatia) Jana Fett (qualified)
4. (France) Jessika Ponchet (qualified)
5. (United States) Alycia Parks (qualifying competition, lucky loser)
6. (Germany) Ella Seidel (qualifying competition, lucky loser)
7. (Croatia) Petra Martić (qualified)
8. (Germany) Tamara Korpatsch (first round)
9. (Italy) Martina Trevisan (first round)
10. (United States) Emina Bektas (qualifying competition, lucky loser)
11. (Philippines) Alexandra Eala (qualified)
12. (Netherlands) Arianne Hartono (qualifying competition)

=== Qualifiers ===
1. (Philippines) Alexandra Eala
2. (United States) Caroline Dolehide
3. (Croatia) Jana Fett
4. (France) Jessika Ponchet
5. (Croatia) Petra Martić
6. (Thailand) Mananchaya Sawangkaew

=== Lucky losers ===
1. (United States) Alycia Parks
2. (United States) Emina Bektas
3. (Germany) Ella Seidel
4. Elena Pridankina

=== Qualifying draw ===
==== First qualifier ====
First round
1	(Ukraine) Yuliia Starodubtseva	3	1
Elena Pridankina	6	6
(China) Gao Xinyu	2	7^{7}	2
11	(Philippines) Alexandra Eala	6	6^{3}	6

Qualifying competition
Elena Pridankina	2	2
11	(Philippines) Alexandra Eala	6	6

==== Second qualifier ====
First round
2	(United States) Caroline Dolehide	6	6
WC	(China) You Xiaodi	1	2
PR	Margarita Betova	1	6^{2}
10	(United States) Emina Bektas	6	7^{7}

Qualifying competition
2	(United States) Caroline Dolehide	6	7^{8}
10	(United States) Emina Bektas	4	6^{6}

==== Third qualifier ====
First round
3	(Croatia) Jana Fett	6	6
WC	(China) Liu Leyi	1	1
(China) Ma Yexin	1	7^{7}	6
9	(Italy) Martina Trevisan	6	6^{2}	4

Qualifying competition
3	(Croatia) Jana Fett	6	6
(China) Ma Yexin	0	3

==== Fourth qualifier ====
First round
4	(France) Jessika Ponchet	6	6
(Canada) Carol Zhao	1	2
(China) Ren Yufei	1	6	3
12	(Netherlands) Arianne Hartono	6	4	6

Qualifying competition
4	(France) Jessika Ponchet	6	7^{9}
12	(Netherlands) Arianne Hartono	4	6^{7}

==== Fifth qualifier ====
First round
5	(United States) Alycia Parks	3	7^{7}	6
(Liechtenstein) Kathinka von Deichmann	6	6^{5}	3
WC	(China) Wang Jiaqi	2	6	4
7	(Croatia) Petra Martić	6	3	6

Qualifying competition
5	(United States) Alycia Parks	4	4
7	(Croatia) Petra Martić	6	6

==== Sixth qualifier ====
First round
6	(Germany) Ella Seidel	7	6
(Czech Republic) Linda Fruhvirtová	5	3
(Thailand) Mananchaya Sawangkaew	0	6	6
8	(Germany) Tamara Korpatsch	6	3	2

Qualifying competition
6	(Germany) Ella Seidel	1	3
(Thailand) Mananchaya Sawangkaew	6	6
