= 2023 Guangzhou Open – Doubles =

Doubles
- 2023 Guangzhou Open

Final
- Champions: (China) Guo Hanyu (China) Jiang Xinyu
- Runners-up: (Japan) Eri Hozumi (Japan) Makoto Ninomiya
- Score: 6–3, 7–6^{(7–4)}

Details
- Draw: 16
- Seeds: 4

Events
Singles	Doubles
- Guangzhou Open

Guo Hanyu and Jiang Xinyu defeated Eri Hozumi and Makoto Ninomiya in the final, 6–3, 7–6^{(7–4)} to win the doubles title at the 2023 Guangzhou Open. It was Guo's first WTA Tour title.

Peng Shuai and Laura Siegemund were the reigning champions from 2019, when the tournament was last held, but Peng had since retired from professional tennis and Siegemund chose not to participate.

== Seeds ==
1. (United States) Sabrina Santamaria / Yana Sizikova (quarterfinals)
2. (Japan) Eri Hozumi / (Japan) Makoto Ninomiya (final)
3. (Czech Republic) Anastasia Dețiuc / (Poland) Katarzyna Piter (semifinals)
4. (Poland) Magda Linette / (Japan) Moyuka Uchijima (quarterfinals)

== Draw ==
Key

- Q = Qualifier
- WC = Wild card
- LL = Lucky loser
- Alt = Alternate
- ITF = ITF entry
- PR = Protected ranking
- SR = Special ranking
- SE = Special exempt
- JE = Junior exempt
- JR = Junior Accelerator Programme entrant
- CO = College Accelerator Programme entrant
- NG = Next Gen Accelerator Program entrant
- w/o = Walkover
- r = Retired
- d = Defaulted

=== Draw ===
First round
1	(United States) S Santamaria; Y Sizikova	6	6
(Georgia (country)) N Dzalamidze (United States) Q Gleason	2	1
(Germany) A-L Friedsam (Ukraine) N Kichenok	1	6	[10]
(France) D Parry (Argentina) N Podoroska	6	1	[2]
4	(Poland) M Linette (Japan) M Uchijima	6	6
(Germany) T Korpatsch (Greece) D Papamichail	4	3
WC	(China) H Guo (China) X Jiang	6	7
(France) J Ponchet (Netherlands) B Schoofs	2	5
(United Kingdom) J Burrage (Spain) R Masarova	6	6^{2}	[10]
(Chinese Taipei) E-s Liang (China) Y Yuan	4	7^{7}	[7]
(Italy) L Bronzetti (China) Xiy Wang	4	3
3	(Czech Republic) A Dețiuc (Poland) K Piter	6	6
(Czech Republic) L Fruhvirtová (United Kingdom) M Lumsden	4	4
L Marozava; D Shnaider	6	6
WC	(China) S Feng (China) Q Tang	2	2
2	(Japan) E Hozumi (Japan) M Ninomiya	6	6

Quarterfinals
1	(United States) S Santamaria; Y Sizikova	3	5
(Germany) A-L Friedsam (Ukraine) N Kichenok	6	7
4	(Poland) M Linette (Japan) M Uchijima	5	3
WC	(China) H Guo (China) X Jiang	7	6
(United Kingdom) J Burrage (Spain) R Masarova	6^{3}	6	[5]
3	(Czech Republic) A Dețiuc (Poland) K Piter	7^{7}	2	[10]
L Marozava; D Shnaider	4	6	[5]
2	(Japan) E Hozumi (Japan) M Ninomiya	6	4	[10]

Semifinals
(Germany) A-L Friedsam (Ukraine) N Kichenok	4	6	[13]
WC	(China) H Guo (China) X Jiang	6	4	[15]
3	(Czech Republic) A Dețiuc (Poland) K Piter	2	6	[7]
2	(Japan) E Hozumi (Japan) M Ninomiya	6	4	[10]

Final
WC	(China) H Guo (China) X Jiang	6	7^{7}
2	(Japan) E Hozumi (Japan) M Ninomiya	3	6^{4}
