= 2023 Guangzhou Open – Singles =

Singles
- 2023 Guangzhou Open

Final
- Champion: (China) Wang Xiyu
- Runner-up: (Poland) Magda Linette
- Score: 6–0, 6–2

Details
- Draw: 32 (6 Q / 3 WC )
- Seeds: 8

Events
| Singles | Doubles |
- Guangzhou Open

Wang Xiyu defeated Magda Linette in the final, 6–0, 6–2 to win the singles title at the 2023 Guangzhou Open. It was her first WTA Tour title.

Sofia Kenin was the reigning champion from 2019, when the tournament was last held, but chose to compete in Guadalajara instead.

== Seeds ==
1. (Poland) Magda Linette (final)
2. (China) Zhu Lin (withdrew)
3. (Germany) Tatjana Maria (quarterfinals)
4. (Italy) Lucia Bronzetti (quarterfinals)
5. (Spain) Rebeka Masarova (quarterfinals)
6. (Czech Republic) Linda Fruhvirtová (first round)
7. (Belgium) Greet Minnen (semifinals)
8. (United States) Claire Liu (first round)

== Draw ==
Key

- Q = Qualifier
- WC = Wild card
- LL = Lucky loser
- Alt = Alternate
- ITF = ITF entry
- PR = Protected ranking
- SR = Special ranking
- SE = Special exempt
- JE = Junior exempt
- JR = Junior Accelerator Programme entrant
- CO = College Accelerator Programme entrant
- NG = Next Gen Accelerator Program entrant
- w/o = Walkover
- r = Retired
- d = Defaulted

=== Finals ===
Semifinals
1 | (Poland) Magda Linette | 6 | 6
(Kazakhstan) Yulia Putintseva | 2 | 3
7 | (Belgium) Greet Minnen | 3 | 4
(China) Wang Xiyu | 6 | 6

Final
1 | (Poland) Magda Linette | 0 | 2
(China) Wang Xiyu | 6 | 6

=== Top half ===
First round
1 | (Poland) M Linette | 6^{3} | 6 | 6
(United Kingdom) J Burrage | 7^{7} | 0 | 2
PR | (Australia) D Saville | 3 | 6 | 6
(Germany) A-L Friedsam | 6 | 3 | 1
(Canada) R Marino | 4 | 3
Q | (Switzerland) V Golubic | 6 | 6
(Ukraine) K Baindl | 5 | 2
5 | (Spain) R Masarova | 7 | 6
3 | (Germany) T Maria | 6 | 6
Q | (Philippines) A Eala | 3 | 0
Q | (Greece) D Papamichail | 3 | 5
WC | (China) Z Bai | 6 | 7
WC | (China) X You | 4 | 0
(Kazakhstan) Y Putintseva | 6 | 6
(Denmark) C Tauson | 6 | 7^{8}
6 | (Czech Republic) L Fruhvirtová | 2 | 6^{6}

Second round
1 | (Poland) M Linette | 6 | 7^{7}
PR | (Australia) D Saville | 0 | 6^{0}
Q | (Switzerland) V Golubic | 1 | 6 | 6^{7}
5 | (Spain) R Masarova | 6 | 3 | 7^{9}
3 | (Germany) T Maria | 6 | 6
WC | (China) Z Bai | 1 | 2
(Kazakhstan) Y Putintseva | 3 | 7^{7} | 0
(Denmark) C Tauson | 6 | 6^{5} | 0^{r}

Quarterfinals
1 | (Poland) M Linette | 7 | 7^{8}
5 | (Spain) R Masarova | 5 | 6^{6}
3 | (Germany) T Maria | 4 | 7^{8} | 0
(Kazakhstan) Y Putintseva | 6 | 6^{6} | 6

Semifinals
1 | (Poland) M Linette | 6 | 6
(Kazakhstan) Y Putintseva | 2 | 3

=== Bottom half ===
First round
7 | (Belgium) G Minnen | 6 | 6
(France) D Parry | 2 | 2
Q | (United Kingdom) H Dart | 6 | 6
(Germany) J Niemeier | 3 | 2
Q | (Japan) M Uchijima | 7 | 3 | 6
LL | (France) J Ponchet | 5 | 6 | 3
Q | (Chinese Taipei) Y-y Yang | 1 | 0
4 | (Italy) L Bronzetti | 6 | 6
8 | (United States) C Liu | 1 | 3
D Shnaider | 6 | 6
(Argentina) N Podoroska | 3 | 3
(China) Xiy Wang | 6 | 6
WC | (China) Y Yuan | 6 | 7^{7}
(Germany) T Korpatsch | 3 | 6^{5}
A Kalinskaya | 6^{4} | 6 | 3
LL | (Slovakia) V Hrunčáková | 7^{7} | 3 | 6

Second round
7 | (Belgium) G Minnen | 7^{9} | 6^{5} | 6
Q | (United Kingdom) H Dart | 6^{7} | 7^{7} | 4
Q | (Japan) M Uchijima | 3 | 3
4 | (Italy) L Bronzetti | 6 | 6
D Shnaider | 4 | 5
(China) Xiy Wang | 6 | 7
WC | (China) Y Yuan | 6^{5} | 7 | 4
LL | (Slovakia) V Hrunčáková | 7^{7} | 5 | 6

Quarterfinals
7 | (Belgium) G Minnen | 6^{8} | 6 | 6
4 | (Italy) L Bronzetti | 7^{10} | 4 | 1
(China) Xiy Wang | 6 | 4 | 6
LL | (Slovakia) V Hrunčáková | 4 | 6 | 3

Semifinals
7 | (Belgium) G Minnen | 3 | 4
(China) Xiy Wang | 6 | 6

== Qualifying ==
=== Seeds ===
1. (Switzerland) Viktorija Golubic (qualified)
2. (Slovakia) Viktória Hrunčáková (qualifying competition, lucky loser)
3. (Switzerland) Jil Teichmann (first round)
4. (France) Jessika Ponchet (qualifying competition, retired, lucky loser)
5. (United Kingdom) Harriet Dart (qualified)
6. (United States) Elizabeth Mandlik (qualifying competition)
7. Valeria Savinykh (qualifying competition)
8. (Japan) Moyuka Uchijima (qualified)
9. (Greece) Despina Papamichail (qualified)
10. (Philippines) Alexandra Eala (qualified)
11. Jana Kolodynska (qualifying competition)
12. (Chinese Taipei) Yang Ya-yi (qualified)

=== Qualifiers ===
1. (Switzerland) Viktorija Golubic
2. (Japan) Moyuka Uchijima
3. (Greece) Despina Papamichail
4. (Chinese Taipei) Yang Ya-yi
5. (United Kingdom) Harriet Dart
6. (Philippines) Alexandra Eala

=== Lucky losers ===
1. (France) Jessika Ponchet
2. (Slovakia) Viktória Hrunčáková

=== Qualifying draw ===
==== First qualifier ====
First round
1 | (Switzerland) Viktorija Golubic | 6 | 7
(Ukraine) Kateryna Volodko | 4 | 5
WC | (China) Liu Leyi | 4 | 0
11 | Jana Kolodynska | 6 | 6

Qualifying competition
1 | (Switzerland) Viktorija Golubic | 6 | 4 | 6
11 | Jana Kolodynska | 2 | 6 | 4

==== Second qualifier ====
First round
2 | (Slovakia) Viktória Hrunčáková | 7^{8} | 7^{8}
(China) Lu Jiajing | 6^{6} | 6^{6}
WC | (China) Dang Yiming | 1 | 2
8 | (Japan) Moyuka Uchijima | 6 | 6

Qualifying competition
2 | (Slovakia) Viktória Hrunčáková | 6^{3} | 3
8 | (Japan) Moyuka Uchijima | 7^{7} | 6

==== Third qualifier ====
First round
3 | (Switzerland) Jil Teichmann | 2 | 6 | 2
(China) Ma Yexin | 6 | 4 | 6
(United Kingdom) Maia Lumsden | 6^{4} | 1
9 | (Greece) Despina Papamichail | 7^{7} | 6

Qualifying competition
(China) Ma Yexin | 3 | 3
9 | (Greece) Despina Papamichail | 6 | 6

==== Fourth qualifier ====
First round
4 | (France) Jessika Ponchet | 6 | 6
WC | (China) Yang Yidi | 3 | 0
WC | (China) Shan Yu | 1 | 3
12 | (Chinese Taipei) Yang Ya-yi | 6 | 6

Qualifying competition
4 | (France) Jessika Ponchet | 6^{4} | 0^{r}
12 | (Chinese Taipei) Yang Ya-yi | 7^{7} | 1

==== Fifth qualifier ====
First round
5 | (United Kingdom) Harriet Dart | 6 | 6
WC | (China) Xun Fangying | 4 | 2
(China) Gao Xinyu | 5 | 2^{r}
7 | Valeria Savinykh | 7 | 4

Qualifying competition
5 | (United Kingdom) Harriet Dart | 6 | 6
7 | Valeria Savinykh | 3 | 4

==== Sixth qualifier ====
First round
6 | (United States) Elizabeth Mandlik | 6 | 6
(China) Wei Sijia | 0 | 2
(Chinese Taipei) Liang En-shuo | 7 | 1 | 5
10 | (Philippines) Alexandra Eala | 5 | 6 | 7

Qualifying competition
6 | (United States) Elizabeth Mandlik | 5 | 6^{3}
10 | (Philippines) Alexandra Eala | 7 | 7^{7}
