= 2025 Guangzhou Open – Doubles =

Doubles
- 2025 Guangzhou Open

Final
- Champions: (Poland) Katarzyna Piter (Indonesia) Janice Tjen
- Runners-up: (Hong Kong) Eudice Chong (Chinese Taipei) Liang En-shuo
- Score: 3–6, 6–3, [10–5]

Details
- Draw: 16
- Seeds: 4

Events
Singles	Doubles
- Guangzhou Open

Katarzyna Piter and Janice Tjen defeated Eudice Chong and Liang En-shuo in the final, 3–6, 6–3, [10–5] to win the doubles title at the 2025 Guangzhou Open.

Kateřina Siniaková and Zhang Shuai were the reigning champions, but did not participate this year.

== Seeds ==
1. (United States) Quinn Gleason / Elena Pridankina (quarterfinals)
2. (Netherlands) Isabelle Haverlag / (United Kingdom) Maia Lumsden (semifinals)
3. (Romania) Monica Niculescu / (United States) Sabrina Santamaria (quarterfinals)
4. (United Kingdom) Emily Appleton / (China) Tang Qianhui (first round)

== Draw ==
Key

- Q = Qualifier
- WC = Wild card
- LL = Lucky loser
- Alt = Alternate
- ITF = ITF entry
- PR = Protected ranking
- SR = Special ranking
- SE = Special exempt
- JE = Junior exempt
- JR = Junior Accelerator Programme entrant
- CO = College Accelerator Programme entrant
- NG = Next Gen Accelerator Program entrant
- w/o = Walkover
- r = Retired
- d = Defaulted

=== Draw ===
First round
1	(United States) Q Gleason; E Pridankina	7	6
(Colombia) C Osorio (China) Y Wang	5	4
WC	(France) L Jeanjean (France) K Mladenovic	7	4	[6]
(Poland) K Piter (Indonesia) J Tjen	5	6	[10]
4	(United Kingdom) E Appleton (China) Q Tang	4	2
(Philippines) A Eala (Ukraine) N Kichenok	6	6
P Kudermetova; K Rakhimova	2	6	[10]
(Thailand) P Plipuech (China) W Zheng	6	2	[3]
WC	(China) S Fanshi (China) S Qu	0	1
(Hong Kong) E Chong (Chinese Taipei) E-s Liang	6	6
Alt	(Czech Republic) D Šalková (Germany) E Seidel	6	0	[6]
3	(Romania) M Niculescu (United States) S Santamaria	3	6	[10]
(Chinese Taipei) I-h Cho (Chinese Taipei) Y-t Cho	4	6^{3}
(United Kingdom) A Barnett (France) E Lechemia	6	7^{7}
Alt	(Italy) L Bronzetti (Italy) E Cocciaretto	4	3
2	(Netherlands) I Haverlag (United Kingdom) M Lumsden	6	6

Quarterfinals
1	(United States) Q Gleason; E Pridankina	6	3	[8]
(Poland) K Piter (Indonesia) J Tjen	3	6	[10]
(Philippines) A Eala (Ukraine) N Kichenok	6	7
P Kudermetova; K Rakhimova	3	5
(Hong Kong) E Chong (Chinese Taipei) E-s Liang	7	6
3	(Romania) M Niculescu (United States) S Santamaria	5	4
(United Kingdom) A Barnett (France) E Lechemia	2	2
2	(Netherlands) I Haverlag (United Kingdom) M Lumsden	6	6

Semifinals
(Poland) K Piter (Indonesia) J Tjen	6^{4}	6	[10]
(Philippines) A Eala (Ukraine) N Kichenok	7^{7}	3	[5]
(Hong Kong) E Chong (Chinese Taipei) E-s Liang	7	6
2	(Netherlands) I Haverlag (United Kingdom) M Lumsden	5	4

Final
(Poland) K Piter (Indonesia) J Tjen	3	6	[10]
(Hong Kong) E Chong (Chinese Taipei) E-s Liang	6	3	[5]
