= Katarzyna Piter =

Polish tennis player (born 1991)

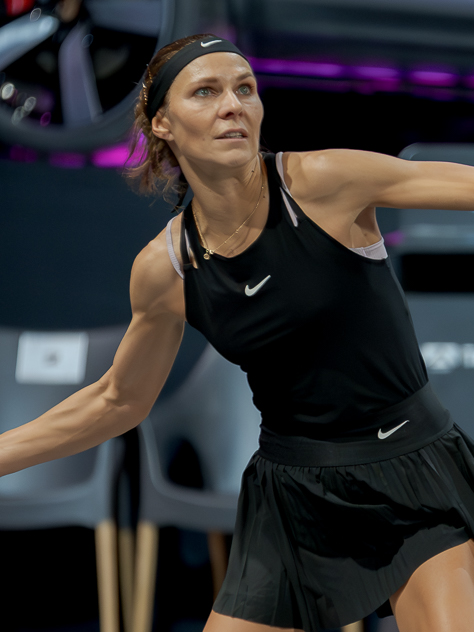
- Piter at the 2025 Transylvania Open
- Country (sports): Poland
- Residence: Ceradz Kościelny, Poland
- Born: 16 February 1991 (age 35) Poznań, Poland
- Height: 1.73 m (5 ft 8 in)
- Turned pro: 2006
- Plays: Right-handed (two-handed backhand)
- Coach: Andres Decock
- Prize money: US$ 1,147,257

Singles
- Career record: 410–324
- Career titles: 0 WTA, 8 ITF
- Highest ranking: No. 95 (12 May 2014)
- Current ranking: No. 1086 (18 May 2026)

Grand Slam singles results
- Australian Open: 1R (2014)
- French Open: 1R (2014)
- Wimbledon: 1R (2014)
- US Open: 1R (2014)

Doubles
- Career record: 407–290
- Career titles: 6
- Highest ranking: No. 49 (9 June 2025)
- Current ranking: No. 65 (18 May 2026)

Grand Slam doubles results
- Australian Open: 2R (2014)
- French Open: 2R (2014, 2023)
- Wimbledon: QF (2026)
- US Open: 2R (2014)

Team competitions
- Fed Cup: 7–6
- Last updated on: 20 May 2026.

Katarzyna Piter (Polish pronunciation: [kataˈʐɨna ˈpitɛr]; born 16 February 1991) is a Polish professional tennis player who specializes in doubles.

On 12 May 2014, she reached her career-high ranking of No. 95 in singles and on 9 June 2025, she achieved her best doubles ranking of No. 49. Piter has won six doubles titles on the WTA Tour and two on WTA 125 tournaments, as well as eight singles and 26 doubles titles on the ITF Women's Circuit.

== Career ==
In July 2013, at the Palermo Ladies Open, Piter won her first title on the WTA Tour. She and partner Kristina Mladenovic upset Karolína and Kristýna Plíšková in the final, in a super-tiebreak. Partnered with Fanny Stollár, she also won the doubles title at the 2023 Budapest Grand Prix, defeating Jessie Aney and Anna Sisková inna champions tiebreak in the final. The pair defended their title in Budapest the following year, beating Anna Danilina and Irina Khromacheva in the final which again went to a deciding champions tiebreak. Piter and Stollár were runners-up in the doubles at the 2024 Guangzhou Open, losing to top seeds Kateřina Siniaková and Zhang Shuai in the final. They also lost in the final at the 2024 Jiangxi Open, this time to Guo Hanyu and Moyuka Uchijima.

Teaming with Mayar Sherif, she won the 2025 Mérida Open, defeating Anna Danilina and Irina Khromacheva in the final. Piter combined with Janice Tjen to claim the 2025 Guangzhou Open, overcoming Eudice Chong and Liang En-shuo in the final which went to a deciding champions tiebreak. At the 2026 Hobart International, she once more teamed with Janice Tjen to win the title, defeating Magali Kempen and Anna Sisková in the final.

== Fed Cup ==
Piter played 2009 for Poland in the Europe/Africa Zone I of the Fed Cup and helped them qualify for the World Group II Play-offs against Japan. In the round-robin stage, she lost her match against Monica Niculescu of Romania, won against Johanna Larsson of Sweden, beat Dijana Stojić of Bosnia and Herzegovina and paired up with Klaudia Jans to beat the Bosnian pairing. In the first play-off against Great Britain, she lost the first singles match to Elena Baltacha, 4–6, 1–6. Poland, however, won that tie.

== Performance timelines ==
Key
| W | F | SF | QF | #R | RR | Q# | DNQ | A | NH |

(W) winner; (F) finalist; (SF) semifinalist; (QF) quarterfinalist; (#R) rounds 4, 3, 2, 1; (RR) round-robin stage; (Q#) qualification round; (DNQ) did not qualify; (A) absent; (NH) not held; (SR) strike rate (events won / competed); (W–L) win–loss record.
To avoid confusion and double counting, these charts are updated at the conclusion of a tournament or when the player's participation has ended.

Only main-draw results in WTA Tour, Grand Slam tournaments, Billie Jean King Cup, United Cup, Hopman Cup and Olympic Games are included in win–loss records.

=== Singles ===
| Tournament | 2007 | 2008 | 2009 | 2010 | 2011 | 2012 | 2013 | 2014 | 2015 | 2016 | 2017 | 2018 | ... | 2021 | W–L |
|---|---|---|---|---|---|---|---|---|---|---|---|---|---|---|---|
Grand Slam tournaments
| Australian Open | A | A | A | A | A | A | A | 1R | Q3 | A | A | A | | A | 0–1 |
| French Open | A | A | A | A | A | A | A | 1R | A | A | A | A | | A | 0–1 |
| Wimbledon | A | A | A | A | A | A | A | 1R | A | A | A | A | | A | 0–1 |
| US Open | A | A | A | A | A | A | Q2 | 1R | Q2 | A | Q1 | A | | A | 0–1 |
| Win–loss | 0–0 | 0–0 | 0–0 | 0–0 | 0–0 | 0–0 | 0–0 | 0–4 | 0–0 | 0–0 | 0–0 | 0–0 | | 0–0 | 0–4 |
National representation
| Billie Jean King Cup (Note: Formerly known as Fed Cup until 2020.) | A | A | PO2 | A | A | A | PO2 | WG2 | A | A | Z1 | A | | A (Note: Edition is split into the two years due to COVID-19.) | 4–5 |
WTA 1000
| Indian Wells Open | A | A | A | A | A | A | A | Q1 | A | A | A | A | | A | 0–0 |
| Miami Open | A | A | A | A | A | A | A | 1R | A | A | A | A | | A | 0–1 |
| Madrid Open | A | A | A | A | A | A | A | Q2 | A | A | A | A | | A | 0–0 |
| Italian Open | A | A | A | A | A | A | A | Q1 | A | A | A | A | | A | 0–0 |
| Win–loss | 0–0 | 0–0 | 0–0 | 0–0 | 0–0 | 0–0 | 0–0 | 0–1 | 0–0 | 0–0 | 0–0 | 0–0 | | 0–0 | 0–1 |
Career statistics
| Tournaments | 1 | 0 | 1 | 1 | 0 | 0 | 2 | 12 | 0 | 1 | 0 | 1 | | 1 | Career total: 20 |
| Overall win–loss | 0–1 | 0–0 | 2–3 | 1–1 | 0–0 | 0–0 | 3–2 | 4–14 | 0–0 | 0–1 | 2–1 | 0–1 | | 0–1 | 12–25 |
| Year-end ranking (Note: 2006: WTA ranking–1340, ... 2019: WTA ranking–357, 2020: WTA ranking–366, ... 2022–23: WTA ranking–n/a.) | 675 | 466 | 330 | 242 | 324 | 376 | 122 | 162 | 218 | 239 | 345 | 297 | | 493 | |

=== Doubles ===
Current through the 2025 Madrid Open

| Tournament | 2009 | 2010 | 2011 | 2012 | 2013 | 2014 | 2015 | 2016 | 2017 | 2018 | 2019 | 2020 | 2021 | 2022 | 2023 | 2024 | 2025 | SR | W–L | Win% |
|---|---|---|---|---|---|---|---|---|---|---|---|---|---|---|---|---|---|---|---|---|
Grand Slam tournaments
| Australian Open | A | A | A | A | A | 2R | 1R | A | A | A | A | A | A | 1R | A | 1R | 1R | 0 / 5 | 1–5 | 17% |
| French Open | A | A | A | A | A | 2R | A | A | A | A | A | A | A | 1R | 2R | 1R | 1R | 0 / 5 | 2–5 | 29% |
| Wimbledon | A | A | A | A | A | 1R | A | A | A | A | A | NH | A | 1R | 1R | 1R | 1R | 0 / 5 | 0–5 | 0% |
| US Open | A | A | A | A | A | 2R | A | A | A | A | A | A | A | 1R | 1R | 1R | 1R | 0 / 5 | 1–5 | 17% |
| Win–loss | 0–0 | 0–0 | 0–0 | 0–0 | 0–0 | 3–4 | 0–1 | 0–0 | 0–0 | 0–0 | 0–0 | 0–0 | 0–0 | 0–4 | 1–3 | 0–4 | 0–4 | 0 / 20 | 4–20 | 17% |
WTA 1000
| Madrid Open | A | A | A | A | A | A | A | A | A | A | A | A | 1R | 1R | A | 2R | 1R | 0 / 4 | 1–4 | 20% |
| Italian Open | A | A | A | A | A | 1R | A | A | A | A | A | A | A | A | A | A | 1R | 0 / 2 | 0–2 | 0% |
| Win–loss | 0–0 | 0–0 | 0–0 | 0–0 | 0–0 | 0–1 | 0–0 | 0–0 | 0–0 | 0–0 | 0–0 | 0–0 | 0–1 | 0–1 | 0–0 | | | 0 / 3 | 0–3 | 0% |
Career statistics
| Tournaments | 0 | 0 | 3 | 0 | 10 | 18 | 6 | 6 | 2 | 2 | 1 | 0 | 17 | 15 | 5 | | | Career total: 85 | | |
| Titles | 0 | 0 | 0 | 0 | 1 | 0 | 0 | 0 | 0 | 0 | 0 | 0 | 0 | 0 | 1 | | | Career total: 2 | | |
| Finals | 0 | 0 | 1 | 0 | 1 | 1 | 0 | 1 | 0 | 0 | 0 | 0 | 2 | 1 | 2 | | | Career total: 9 | | |
| Overall win–loss | 1–0 | 0–0 | 4–3 | 0–0 | 13–9 | 12–18 | 5–6 | 6–6 | 4–3 | 1–2 | 0–1 | 0–0 | 11–17 | 8–15 | 8–4 | | | 2 / 85 | 73–84 | 46% |
| Year-end ranking (Note: 2008: WTA ranking–585.) | 322 | 385 | 129 | 183 | 81 | 78 | 146 | 116 | 247 | 213 | 248 | 134 | 93 | 114 | 67 | 63 | 59 | | | |

== WTA Tour finals ==
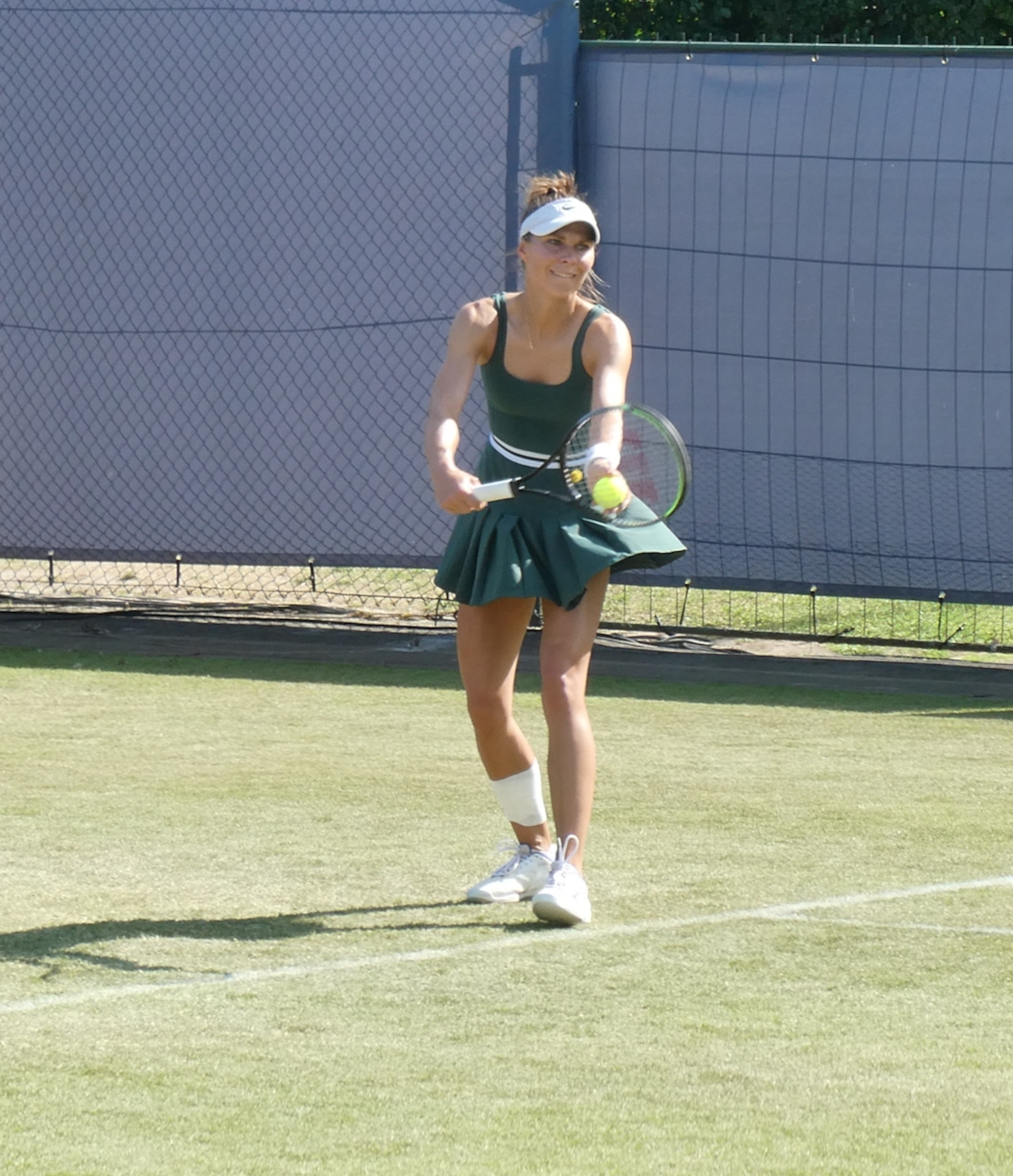
Piter at the 2025 Rosmalen Open

=== Doubles: 15 (6 titles, 10 runner-ups) ===
| Legend Grand Slam (–) WTA 1000 (–) WTA 500 (1–0) WTA 250 (5–10) | Finals by surface Hard (3–4) Clay (3–6) |

| Result | W–L | Date | Tournament | Tier | Surface | Partner | Opponents | Score |
|---|---|---|---|---|---|---|---|---|
| Loss | 0–1 | Jun 2011 | Danish Open, Denmark | International (Note: The WTA International tournaments were reclassified as WTA 250 tournaments in 2021.) | Hard | (France) Kristina Mladenovic | (Sweden) Johanna Larsson (Germany) Jasmin Wöhr | 3–6, 3–6 |
| Win | 1–1 | Jul 2013 | Palermo Ladies Open, Italy | International | Clay | (France) Kristina Mladenovic | (Czech Republic) Karolína Plíšková (Czech Republic) Kristýna Plíšková | 6–1, 5–7, [10–8] |
| Loss | 1–2 | Apr 2014 | Marrakesh Grand Prix, Morocco | International | Clay | (Belgium) Maryna Zanevska | (Spain) Garbiñe Muguruza (Switzerland) Romina Oprandi | 6–4, 2–6, [9–11] |
| Loss | 1–3 | Jul 2016 | Bucharest Open, Romania | International | Clay | (Romania) Alexandra Cadanțu | (Australia) Jessica Moore (Thailand) Varatchaya Wongteanchai | 3–6, 6–7^{(5–7)} |
| Loss | 1–4 | Jul 2021 | Poland Open, Poland | WTA 250 | Clay | (Ukraine) Kateryna Bondarenko | (Kazakhstan) Anna Danilina (Belarus) Lidziya Marozava | 3–6, 2–6 |
| Loss | 1–5 | Aug 2021 | Cluj-Napoca Open, Romania | WTA 250 | Clay | (Egypt) Mayar Sherif | (Georgia (country)) Natela Dzalamidze (Slovenia) Kaja Juvan | 3–6, 4–6 |
| Loss | 1–6 | Jul 2022 | Budapest Grand Prix, Hungary | WTA 250 | Clay | (Belgium) Kimberley Zimmermann | (Georgia (country)) Ekaterine Gorgodze (Georgia (country)) Oksana Kalashnikova | 6–1, 4–6, [6–10] |
| Loss | 1–7 | Apr 2023 | Copa Colsanitas, Colombia | WTA 250 | Clay | (Georgia (country)) Oksana Kalashnikova | (Russia) Irina Khromacheva (Belarus) Iryna Shymanovich | 1–6, 6–3, [6–10] |
| Win | 2–7 | Jul 2023 | Budapest Grand Prix, Hungary | WTA 250 | Clay | (Hungary) Fanny Stollár | (United States) Jessie Aney (Czech Republic) Anna Sisková | 6–2, 4–6, [10–4] |
| Loss | 2–8 | Jul 2023 | Poland Open, Poland | WTA 250 | Hard | (Poland) Weronika Falkowska | (United Kingdom) Heather Watson (Belgium) Yanina Wickmayer | 4–6, 4–6 |
| Win | 3–8 | Jul 2024 | Budapest Grand Prix, Hungary (2) | WTA 250 | Clay | (Hungary) Fanny Stollár | (Kazakhstan) Anna Danilina (Russia) Irina Khromacheva | 6–3, 3–6, [10–3] |
| Loss | 3–9 | Oct 2024 | Guangzhou Open, China | WTA 250 | Hard | (Hungary) Fanny Stollár | (Czech Republic) Kateřina Siniaková (China) Zhang Shuai | 4–6, 1–6 |
| Loss | 3–10 | Oct 2024 | Jiangxi Open, China | WTA 250 | Hard | (Hungary) Fanny Stollár | (China) Guo Hanyu (Japan) Moyuka Uchijima | 6–7^{(5–7)}, 5–7 |
| Win | 4–10 | Mar 2025 | Mérida Open, Mexico | WTA 500 | Hard | (Egypt) Mayar Sherif | (Kazakhstan) Anna Danilina (Russia) Irina Khromacheva | 7–6^{(7–2)}, 7–5 |
| Win | 5–10 | Oct 2025 | Guangzhou Open, China | WTA 250 | Hard | (Indonesia) Janice Tjen | (Hong Kong) Eudice Chong (Chinese Taipei) Liang En-shuo | 3–6, 6–3, [10–5] |
| Win | 6–10 | Jan 2026 | Hobart International, Australia | WTA 250 | Hard | (Indonesia) Janice Tjen | (Belgium) Magali Kempen (Czech Republic) Anna Sisková | 6–2, 6–2 |

== WTA 125 finals ==
=== Doubles: 7 (2 titles, 5 runner-ups) ===
| Result | W–L | Date | Tournament | Surface | Partner | Opponents | Score |
|---|---|---|---|---|---|---|---|
| Loss | 0–1 | Sep 2021 | Karlsruhe Open, Germany | Clay | (Egypt) Mayar Sherif | (Romania) Irina Bara (Georgia (country)) Ekaterine Gorgodze | 3–6, 6–2, [7–10] |
| Loss | 0–2 | Apr 2023 | San Luis Open, Mexico | Clay | (Georgia (country)) Oksana Kalashnikova | (Spain) Aliona Bolsova (Venezuela) Andrea Gámiz | 6–7^{(5–7)}, 4–6 |
| Loss | 0–3 | Jun 2023 | Veneto Open, Italy | Grass | (Poland) Weronika Falkowska | (South Korea) Han Na-lae (South Korea) Jang Su-jeong | 3–6, 6–3, [6–10] |
| Loss | 0–4 | Mar 2024 | San Luis Open, Mexico | Clay | (Brazil) Laura Pigossi | (Hungary) Anna Bondár (Slovenia) Tamara Zidanšek | w/o |
| Loss | 0–5 | May 2024 | Catalonia Open, Spain | Clay | (Egypt) Mayar Sherif | (United States) Nicole Melichar-Martinez (Australia) Ellen Perez | 5–7, 2–6 |
| Win | 1–5 | Jun 2024 | Internacional de Valencia, Spain | Clay | (Hungary) Fanny Stollár | (Italy) Angelica Moratelli (Mexico) Renata Zarazúa | 6–1, 4–6, [10–8] |
| Win | 2–5 | Sep 2024 | Guadalajara Open, Mexico | Hard | (Hungary) Fanny Stollár | (Italy) Angelica Moratelli (United States) Sabrina Santamaria | 6–4, 7–5 |

== ITF Circuit finals ==
=== Singles: 20 (8 titles, 12 runner-ups) ===
| Legend $100,000 tournaments (0–1) $25,000 tournaments (3–7) $10,000 tournaments (5–4) | Finals by surface Hard (2–3) Clay (6–8) Carpet (0–1) |

| Result | W–L | Date | Tournament | Tier | Surface | Opponent | Score |
|---|---|---|---|---|---|---|---|
| Loss | 0–1 | May 2007 | ITF Michalovce, Slovakia | 10,000 | Clay | (Slovakia) Kristína Kučová | 6–2, 3–6, 4–6 |
| Win | 1–1 | Aug 2007 | ITF Bielefeld, Germany | 10,000 | Clay | (Germany) Dominice Ripoll | 3–6, 6–3, 6–4 |
| Win | 2–1 | Mar 2008 | ITF Ain Sukhna, Egypt | 10,000 | Clay | (Romania) Irina-Camelia Begu | 7–6^{(9–7)}, 6–4 |
| Win | 3–1 | Mar 2008 | ITF Cairo, Egypt | 10,000 | Clay | (Netherlands) Bibiane Schoofs | 6–1, 6–3 |
| Win | 4–1 | Nov 2008 | ITF Jersey, United Kingdom | 10,000 | Hard (i) | (Switzerland) Stefania Boffa | 6–2, 6–2 |
| Loss | 4–2 | Jul 2009 | ITF Brussels, Belgium | 10,000 | Clay | (Ukraine) Maryna Zanevska | 6–0, 5–7, 5–7 |
| Win | 5–2 | Mar 2010 | GB Pro-Series Bath, UK | 10,000 | Hard (i) | (Slovakia) Lenka Juríková | 6–2, 7–6^{(8–6)} |
| Win | 6–2 | Aug 2010 | ITF Koksijde, Belgium | 25,000 | Clay | (Netherlands) Kiki Bertens | 6–4, 6–4 |
| Loss | 6–3 | Sep 2011 | ITF Alphen aan den Rijn, Netherlands | 25,000 | Clay | (Liechtenstein) Stephanie Vogt | 2–6, 4–6 |
| Loss | 6–4 | Feb 2012 | ITF Tallinn, Estonia | 10,000 | Hard (i) | (Estonia) Anett Kontaveit | 5–7, 4–6 |
| Loss | 6–5 | Mar 2012 | GB Pro-Series Bath, UK | 10,000 | Hard (i) | (Czech Republic) Tereza Smitková | 6–4, 2–6, 1–6 |
| Loss | 6–6 | Jun 2013 | Grado Tennis Cup, Italy | 25,000 | Clay | (Austria) Yvonne Meusburger | 2–6, 7–6^{(7–2)}, 3–6 |
| Loss | 6–7 | Jul 2013 | Bella Cup Toruñ, Poland | 25,000 | Clay | (Poland) Paula Kania | 4–6, 4–6 |
| Loss | 6–8 | Jul 2013 | ITS Cup Olomouc, Czech Republic | 100,000 | Clay | (Slovenia) Polona Hercog | 0–6, 3–6 |
| Loss | 6–9 | Aug 2013 | ITF Izmir, Turkey | 25,000 | Hard | (Croatia) Ana Vrljić | 1–6, 3–6 |
| Win | 7–9 | May 2015 | Grado Tennis Cup, Italy | 25,000 | Clay | (Slovakia) Kristina Schmiedlová | 6–3, 6–0 |
| Loss | 7–10 | Aug 2016 | ITF Bagnatica, Italy | 25,000 | Clay | (Italy) Martina Trevisan | 1–6, 7–5, 5–7 |
| Win | 8–10 | Jan 2017 | ITF Orlando, United States | 25,000 | Clay | (United States) Sofia Kenin | 6–7^{(4–7)}, 6–2, 6–4 |
| Loss | 8–11 | Nov 2017 | ITF Zawada, Poland | 25,000 | Carpet (i) | (Italy) Deborah Chiesa | 2–6, 6–4, 4–6 |
| Loss | 8–12 | Jul 2018 | ITF Horb, Germany | 25,000 | Clay | (Germany) Katharina Gerlach | 6–4, 3–6, 6–7^{(4–7)} |

=== Doubles: 50 (26 titles, 24 runner-ups) ===
| Legend $100,000 tournaments (2–1) $75/80,000 tournaments (1–2) $50/60,000 tournaments (2–0) $25,000 tournaments (18–20) $10,000 tournaments (3–1) | Finals by surface Hard (8–9) Clay (16–13) Carpet (2–2) |

| Result | W–L | Date | Tournament | Tier | Surface | Partner | Opponents | Score |
|---|---|---|---|---|---|---|---|---|
| Win | 1–0 | May 2008 | ITF Michalovce, Slovakia | 10,000 | Clay | (Slovakia) Lenka Juríková | (Slovakia) Romana Tabak (Slovakia) Nikola Vajdová | 6–1, 6–1 |
| Win | 2–0 | Oct 2008 | ITF Les Franqueses del Vallès, Spain | 10,000 | Hard | (North Macedonia) Aleksandra Josifoska | (Serbia and Montenegro) Bojana Borovnica (Spain) Cristina Sánchez-Quintanar | 6–3, 2–6, [10–3] |
| Loss | 2–1 | Nov 2008 | ITF Opole, Poland | 25,000 | Carpet (i) | (Netherlands) Arantxa Rus | (Poland) Karolina Kosińska (Poland) Aleksandra Rosolska | 6–2, 6–7^{(6)}, [7–10] |
| Win | 3–1 | Mar 2010 | GB Pro-Series Bath, United Kingdom | 10,000 | Hard (i) | (Denmark) Malou Ejdesgaard | (United Kingdom) Jade Curtis (United Kingdom) Anna Fitzpatrick | 6–3, 6–2 |
| Loss | 3–2 | Jul 2010 | Bella Cup Toruñ, Poland | 25,000 | Clay | (Poland) Barbara Sobaszkiewicz | (Serbia) Teodora Mirčić (Australia) Marija Mirkovic | 6–4, 2–6, [5–10] |
| Loss | 3–3 | Sep 2010 | ITF Katowice, Poland | 25,000 | Clay | (Poland) Barbara Sobaszkiewicz | (Poland) Olga Brózda (Poland) Natalia Kołat | 3–6, 3–6 |
| Loss | 3–4 | Nov 2010 | ITF Minsk, Belarus | 25,000 | Hard (i) | (Poland) Paula Kania | (Russia) Elena Bovina (Russia) Ekaterina Bychkova | 4–6, 0–6 |
| Loss | 3–5 | Mar 2011 | GB Pro-Series Bath, UK | 25,000 | Hard (i) | (Poland) Marta Domachowska | (Hungary) Tímea Babos (Luxembourg) Anne Kremer | 6–7^{(5)}, 2–6 |
| Loss | 3–6 | Apr 2011 | ITF Casablanca, Morocco | 25,000 | Clay | (Poland) Magda Linette | (Austria) Sandra Klemenschits (France) Kristina Mladenovic | 3–6, 6–3, [8–10] |
| Win | 4–6 | Jun 2011 | ITF Padova, Italy | 25,000 | Clay | (France) Kristina Mladenovic | (Ukraine) Irina Buryachok (Hungary) Réka Luca Jani | 6–4, 6–3 |
| Loss | 4–7 | Aug 2011 | ITF Prague-Neride, Czech Republic | 25,000 | Clay | (Slovakia) Jana Čepelová | (Czech Republic) Iveta Gerlová (Czech Republic) Lucie Kriegsmannová | 7–6^{(8)}, 1–6, [8–10] |
| Loss | 4–8 | Sep 2011 | ITF Alphen aan den Rijn, Netherlands | 25,000 | Clay | (Poland) Barbara Sobaszkiewicz | (Romania) Diana Enache (Netherlands) Daniëlle Harmsen | 2–6, 7–6^{(4)}, [9–11] |
| Win | 5–8 | Oct 2011 | ITF Sant Cugat, Spain | 25,000 | Clay | (Slovakia) Jana Čepelová | (Spain) Leticia Costas-Moreira (Spain) Inés Ferrer Suárez | 6–3, 2–6, [10–6] |
| Loss | 5–9 | Mar 2012 | GB Pro-Series Bath, UK | 10,000 | Hard (i) | (Slovakia) Lenka Juríková | (United Kingdom) Samantha Murray (United Kingdom) Emily Webley-Smith | 6–4, 4–6, [5–10] |
| Win | 6–9 | May 2012 | ITF Caserta, Italy | 25,000 | Clay | (Slovakia) Romana Tabak | (Switzerland) Viktorija Golubic (Serbia) Aleksandra Krunić | 6–2, 6–4 |
| Win | 7–9 | Jun 2012 | ITF Ystad, Sweden | 25,000 | Clay | (Poland) Magda Linette | (Georgia (country)) Oksana Kalashnikova (Slovakia) Lenka Wienerová | 6–3, 6–3 |
| Loss | 7–10 | Jul 2012 | Bella Cup Toruñ, Poland | 25,000 | Clay | (Poland) Barbara Sobaszkiewicz | (Czech Republic) Kateřina Kramperová (Czech Republic) Martina Kubicikova | 6–1, 3–6, [4–10] |
| Win | 8–10 | Sep 2012 | ITF Sofia, Bulgaria | 25,000 | Clay | (Poland) Barbara Sobaszkiewicz | (Russia) Marina Melnikova (Romania) Raluca Olaru | 7–5, 6–1 |
| Win | 9–10 | Sep 2012 | ITF Dobrich, Bulgaria | 25,000 | Clay | (Poland) Barbara Sobaszkiewicz | (Switzerland) Lisa Sabino (Germany) Anne Schäfer | 6–2, 7–5 |
| Win | 10–10 | Oct 2012 | ITF Seville, Spain | 25,000 | Clay | (Poland) Paula Kania | (Bulgaria) Aleksandrina Naydenova (Brazil) Teliana Pereira | 5–7, 6–4, [10–6] |
| Win | 11–10 | Nov 2012 | ITF Équeurdreville, France | 25,000 | Hard (i) | (Poland) Magda Linette | (Switzerland) Amra Sadiković (Croatia) Ana Vrljić | 6–4, 7–6^{(4)} |
| Win | 12–10 | Dec 2012 | Ankara Cup, Turkey | 50,000 | Hard (i) | (Poland) Magda Linette | (Ukraine) Irina Buryachok (Russia) Valeria Solovieva | 6–2, 6–2 |
| Win | 13–10 | Apr 2013 | Nana Trophy Tunis, Tunisia | 25,000 | Clay | (Serbia) Aleksandra Krunić | (Hungary) Réka Luca Jani (Russia) Eugeniya Pashkova | 6–2, 3–6, [10–7] |
| Loss | 13–11 | Jun 2013 | ITF Zlín, Czech Republic | 25,000 | Clay | (Poland) Paula Kania | (Czech Republic) Martina Borecká (Czech Republic) Tereza Smitková | 1–6, 7–5, [8–10] |
| Win | 14–11 | Aug 2013 | ITF Izmir, Turkey | 25,000 | Hard | (Serbia) Aleksandra Krunić | (United States) Kristi Boxx (New Zealand) Abigail Guthrie | 6–2, 6–2 |
| Loss | 14–12 | Oct 2014 | Internationaux de Poitiers, France | 100,000 | Hard (i) | (Ukraine) Maryna Zanevska | (Czech Republic) Andrea Hlaváčková (Czech Republic) Lucie Hradecká | 1–6, 5–7 |
| Loss | 14–13 | May 2015 | Grado Tennis Cup, Italy | 25,000 | Clay | (Canada) Sharon Fichman | (Switzerland) Viktorija Golubic (Brazil) Beatriz Haddad Maia | 3–6, 2–6 |
| Win | 15–13 | Feb 2016 | ITF Perth, Australia | 25,000 | Hard | (Australia) Tammi Patterson | (South Korea) Han Na-lae (South Korea) Jang Su-jeong | 4–6, 6–2, [10–3] |
| Win | 16–13 | Jun 2016 | ITF Padua, Italy | 25,000 | Clay | (Italy) Alice Matteucci | (Romania) Cristina Dinu (North Macedonia) Lina Gjorcheska | 2–6, 7–6^{(1)}, [10–8] |
| Win | 17–13 | Jun 2016 | ITF Rome, Italy | 25,000 | Clay | (Italy) Claudia Giovine | (Venezuela) Andrea Gámiz (Hungary) Réka Luca Jani | 6–3, 3–6, [10–7] |
| Loss | 17–14 | Jan 2017 | ITF Daytona Beach, United States | 25,000 | Clay | (Poland) Paula Kania | (United States) Robin Anderson (Ukraine) Anhelina Kalinina | 4–6, 1–6 |
| Loss | 17–15 | Jan 2017 | ITF Orlando, US | 25,000 | Clay | (Poland) Paula Kania | (United States) Sophie Chang (United States) Madeleine Kobelt | 3–6, 6–3, [6–10] |
| Loss | 17–16 | Jun 2017 | ITF Warsaw, Poland | 25,000 | Clay | (Poland) Katarzyna Kawa | (Australia) Priscilla Hon (Belarus) Vera Lapko | 6–7^{(3)}, 4–6 |
| Loss | 17–17 | Feb 2018 | GB Pro-Series Glasgow, UK | 25,000 | Hard (i) | (Hungary) Dalma Gálfi | (Belgium) Ysaline Bonaventure (Greece) Valentini Grammatikopoulou | 5–7, 4–6 |
| Win | 18–17 | Feb 2018 | AK Ladies Open, Germany | 25,000 | Carpet (i) | (Latvia) Diāna Marcinkēviča | (Greece) Valentini Grammatikopoulou (Belgium) Maryna Zanevska | w/o |
| Win | 19–17 | Sep 2018 | ITF Óbidos, Portugal | 25,000 | Carpet | (Russia) Valeria Savinykh | (Georgia (country)) Mariam Bolkvadze (Portugal) Ines Murta | 6–3, 6–2 |
| Win | 20–17 | Oct 2018 | ITF Cherbourg-en-Cotentin, France | 25,000 | Hard (i) | (Czech Republic) Barbora Štefková | (United Kingdom) Alicia Barnett (United Kingdom) Eden Silva | 6–2, 6–1 |
| Loss | 20–18 | Nov 2018 | ITF Pétange, Luxembourg | 25,000 | Hard (i) | (Slovakia) Chantal Škamlová | (Russia) Anastasia Pribylova (Serbia) Nina Stojanović | 6–2, 2–6, [8–10] |
| Loss | 20–19 | Feb 2019 | AK Ladies Open, Germany | 25,000 | Carpet (i) | (Belgium) Marie Benoît | (Spain) Cristina Bucșa (Netherlands) Rosalie van der Hoek | 7–5, 3–6, [10–12] |
| Win | 21–19 | Apr 2019 | ITF Jackson, US | 25,000 | Clay | (Poland) Katarzyna Kawa | (United States) Hanna Chang (United States) Caitlin Whoriskey | 7–5, 6–1 |
| Win | 22–19 | Jul 2019 | ITF Bytom, Poland | 25,000 | Clay | (Hungary) Dalma Gálfi | (Ukraine) Maryna Chernyshova (Russia) Daria Lodikova | 6–4, 6–0 |
| Loss | 22–20 | Sep 2019 | ITF Prague, Czech Republic | 25,000 | Clay | (Ukraine) Anastasiya Shoshyna | (Netherlands) Suzan Lamens (Russia) Marina Melnikova | 2–6, 7–5, [8–10] |
| Loss | 22–21 | Oct 2019 | ITF İstanbul, Turkey | 25,000 | Hard (i) | (Switzerland) Susan Bandecchi | (Netherlands) Richèl Hogenkamp (Netherlands) Lesley Pattinama Kerkhove | 2–6, 6–2, [6–10] |
| Loss | 22–22 | Nov 2019 | ITF Pétange, Luxemburg | 25,000 | Hard (i) | (Netherlands) Arantxa Rus | (Romania) Laura Ioana Paar (Germany) Julia Wachaczyk | 6–7^{(11)}, 6–1, [9–11] |
| Win | 23–22 | Feb 2020 | Cairo Open, Egypt | 100,000 | Hard | (Serbia) Aleksandra Krunić | (Netherlands) Arantxa Rus (Egypt) Mayar Sherif | 6–4, 6–2 |
| Win | 24–22 | Sep 2020 | Open de Saint-Malo, France | 60,000 | Clay | (Poland) Paula Kania | (Poland) Magdalena Fręch (Switzerland) Viktorija Golubic | 6–2, 6–4 |
| Loss | 24–23 | Sep 2020 | Open de Cagnes-sur-Mer, France | 80,000 | Clay | (Poland) Paula Kania | (United Kingdom) Samantha Murray Sharan (Germany) Julia Wachaczyk | 5–7, 2–6 |
| Loss | 24–24 | Nov 2020 | Tyler Pro Challenge, US | 80,000 | Hard | (Poland) Paula Kania | (United States) Allura Zamarripa (United States) Maribella Zamarripa | 3–6, 7–5, [9–11] |
| Win | 25–24 | Apr 2022 | Oeiras Ladies Open, Portugal | 80,000 | Clay | (Belgium) Kimberley Zimmermann | (Serbia) Natalija Stevanović (Germany) Katharina Gerlach | 6–1, 6–1 |
| Win | 26–24 | Aug 2024 | ITF Maspalomas, Spain | W100 | Clay | (Hungary) Fanny Stollár | (Italy) Angelica Moratelli (United States) Sabrina Santamaria | 6–4, 6–2 |

== Head-to-head records ==
=== Record against top 10 players ===
| Result | W–L | Opponent | Rank | Event | Surface | Round | Score | Rank | H2H |
|---|---|---|---|---|---|---|---|---|---|
2007
| Loss | 0–1 | (Russia) Nadia Petrova | No. 9 | Warsaw Open, Poland | Clay | 1R | 3–6, 5–7 | n/a | |
2014
| Loss | 0–2 | (Germany) Angelique Kerber | No. 9 | French Open, France | Clay | 1R | 3–6, 1–6 | No. 95 | |

== See also ==
- Poland Fed Cup team
