= Wang Xiyu =

Chinese tennis player (born 2001)

Wang Xiyu 王曦雨
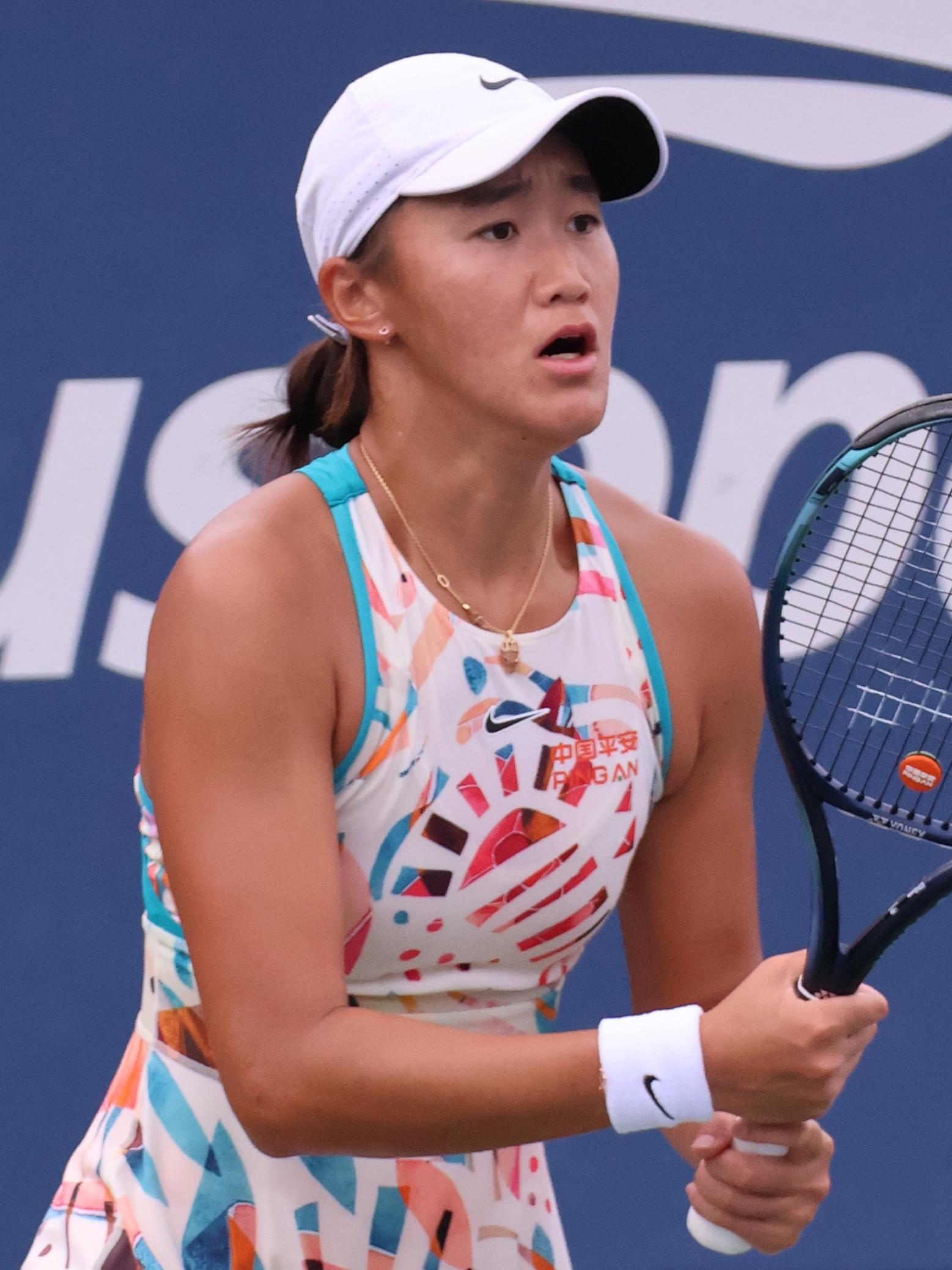
- Wang at the 2023 US Open
- Country (sports): China
- Born: 28 March 2001 (age 25) Taixing, China
- Height: 1.82 m (6 ft 0 in)
- Turned pro: 2018
- Plays: Left-handed (two-handed backhand)
- Prize money: $3,552,737

Singles
- Career record: 271–183
- Career titles: 1 WTA, 7 ITF
- Highest ranking: No. 49 (9 January 2023)
- Current ranking: No. 85 (28 September 2026)

Grand Slam singles results
- Australian Open: 2R (2022, 2025)
- French Open: 4R (2026)
- Wimbledon: 1R (2022, 2023, 2024)
- US Open: 3R (2022)

Other tournaments
- Olympic Games: 3R (2024)

Doubles
- Career record: 64–64
- Career titles: 0 WTA, 3 ITF
- Highest ranking: No. 87 (14 October 2024)
- Current ranking: No. 370 (28 September 2026)

Grand Slam doubles results
- Australian Open: 2R (2024)
- French Open: 2R (2024)
- Wimbledon: 1R (2022, 2023, 2024)
- US Open: 2R (2026)
Medal record
Women's tennis
Representing China
Asian Games
Gold medal – first place	2026 Aichi-Nagoya	Singles
Girl's tennis
Representing China
Youth Olympics Games
Bronze medal – third place	2018 Buenos Aires	Doubles
- Last updated on: 2 October 2026.

Wang Xiyu (Chinese: 王曦雨; pinyin: Wáng Xīyǔ; Mandarin pronunciation: [wǎŋ ɕí ỳ]; born 28 March 2001) is a Chinese professional tennis player. She reached a career-high WTA singles ranking of No. 49 on 9 January 2023, and a best doubles ranking of No. 87 on 14 October 2024.

Wang became junior world No. 1 on 10 September 2018, right after winning her only singles major title at the 2018 US Open, defeating Clara Burel in the final. The same year, she finished as quarterfinalist in the Australian Open and French Open and then as semifinalist in Wimbledon, all in singles. In doubles, she also won one major title, at the 2018 Wimbledon Championships, partnering with Wang Xinyu, and finished runner-up at the 2017 US Open alongside Lea Bošković. She also reached semifinals at the 2017 French Open and 2018 Australian Open.

== Career ==
=== Juniors ===
On the ITF Junior Circuit, Wang won six singles and eight doubles titles.

==== Grand Slam performance ====
Singles:

- Australian Open: QF (2018)
- French Open: QF (2018)
- Wimbledon: SF (2018)
- US Open: W (2018)

Doubles:

- Australian Open: SF (2018)
- French Open: SF (2017)
- Wimbledon: W (2018)
- US Open: F (2017)

=== 2016–17: Professional debut ===
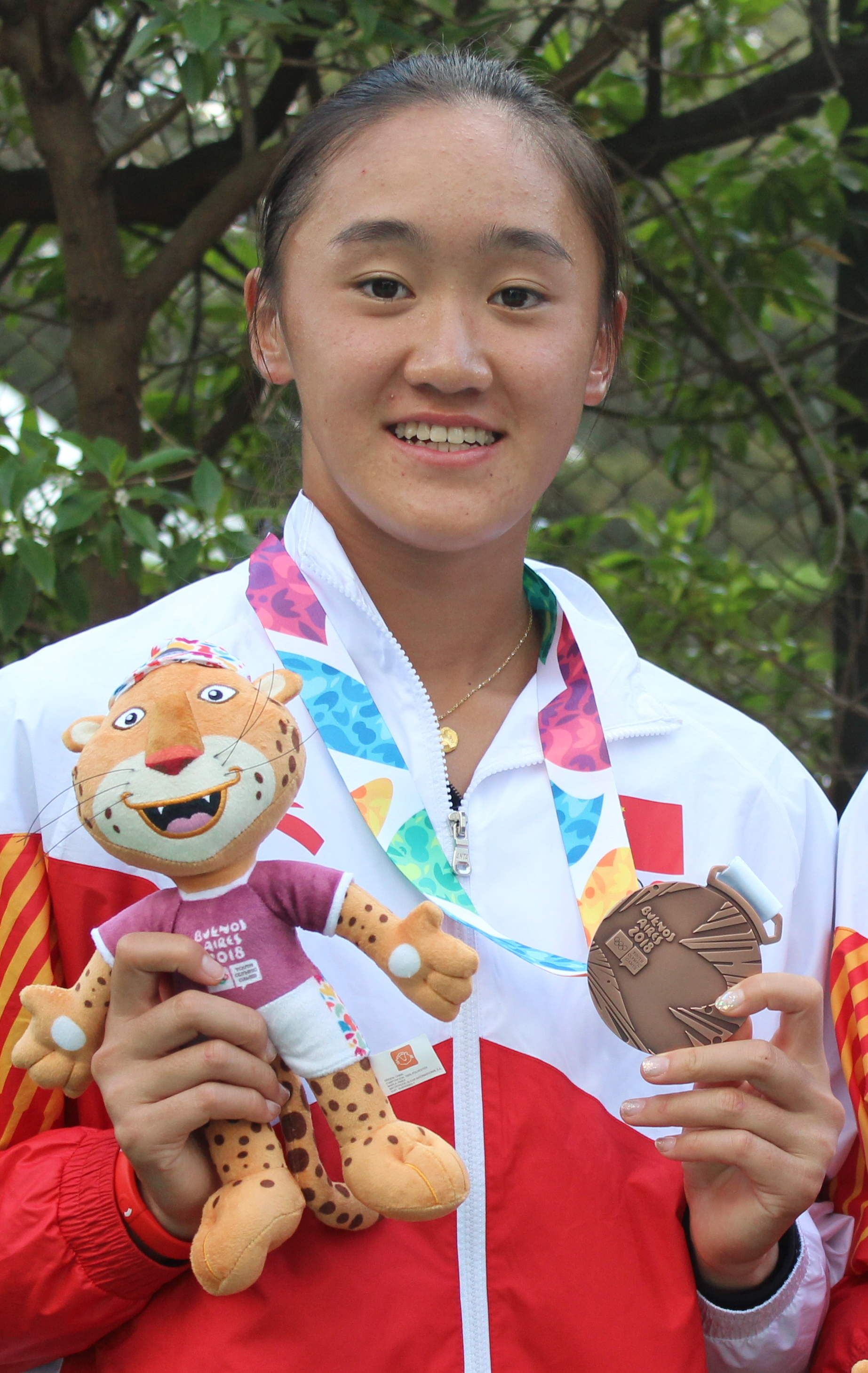
Wang Xiyu at the 2018 Summer Youth Olympics

Wang made her ITF Women's Circuit debut in 2016 at Anning as a wildcard player. Despite the loss in her first match, the following week she reached semifinal at another $10k event in the same city. In October 2017, she made her WTA Tour main-draw debut at the 2017 Tianjin Open and recorded her first win, over Danka Kovinić.

=== 2018: Breakthrough season ===
She had her breakthrough in 2018. In the early season, she reached quarterfinals at the $60k Burnie International, and soon after, she competed at the Premier Mandatory Miami Open but failed to qualify. In April, she recorded her first win on the WTA Challenger Tour, defeating Naomi Broady in order to reach the second round of the Zhengzhou Women's Open. In August, she won her first singles title, defeating Barbora Štefková in the final of a $25k event in Nonthaburi. She then finished runner-up at another $25k event in Nonthaburi and won the title at the $25k event in Tsukuba. Her last tournament of the season was the Wuhan Open, where she made her debut at Premier 5-level tournaments. There, she recorded a win over wildcard player Bernarda Pera, before losing in a tense match against Daria Kasatkina.

=== 2019: Major and WTA Premier debuts ===
Wang reached another quarterfinal at the Burnie International. In March, she made her debut at the Premier Mandatory level tournaments as a wildcard, reaching the second round of the Miami Open. There, she also recorded her first win on that level, defeating Monica Puig in the first round. In April, she reached final at the $25k event in Osaka and one month later won her first bigger title at the $60k event in La Bisbal d'Emporda, defeating Dalma Gálfi in the final. In June, she reached quarterfinals at the $100k Manchester Trophy. Unlike the first three majors of the year, Wang reached the main draw at the US Open, but lost to Kirsten Flipkens in the first round. Later, she had first-round losses at the Wuhan Open and China Open, but ended one round further at the Tianjin Open.

=== 2020-22: First WTA Tour semifinal & major match win, top 50 ===
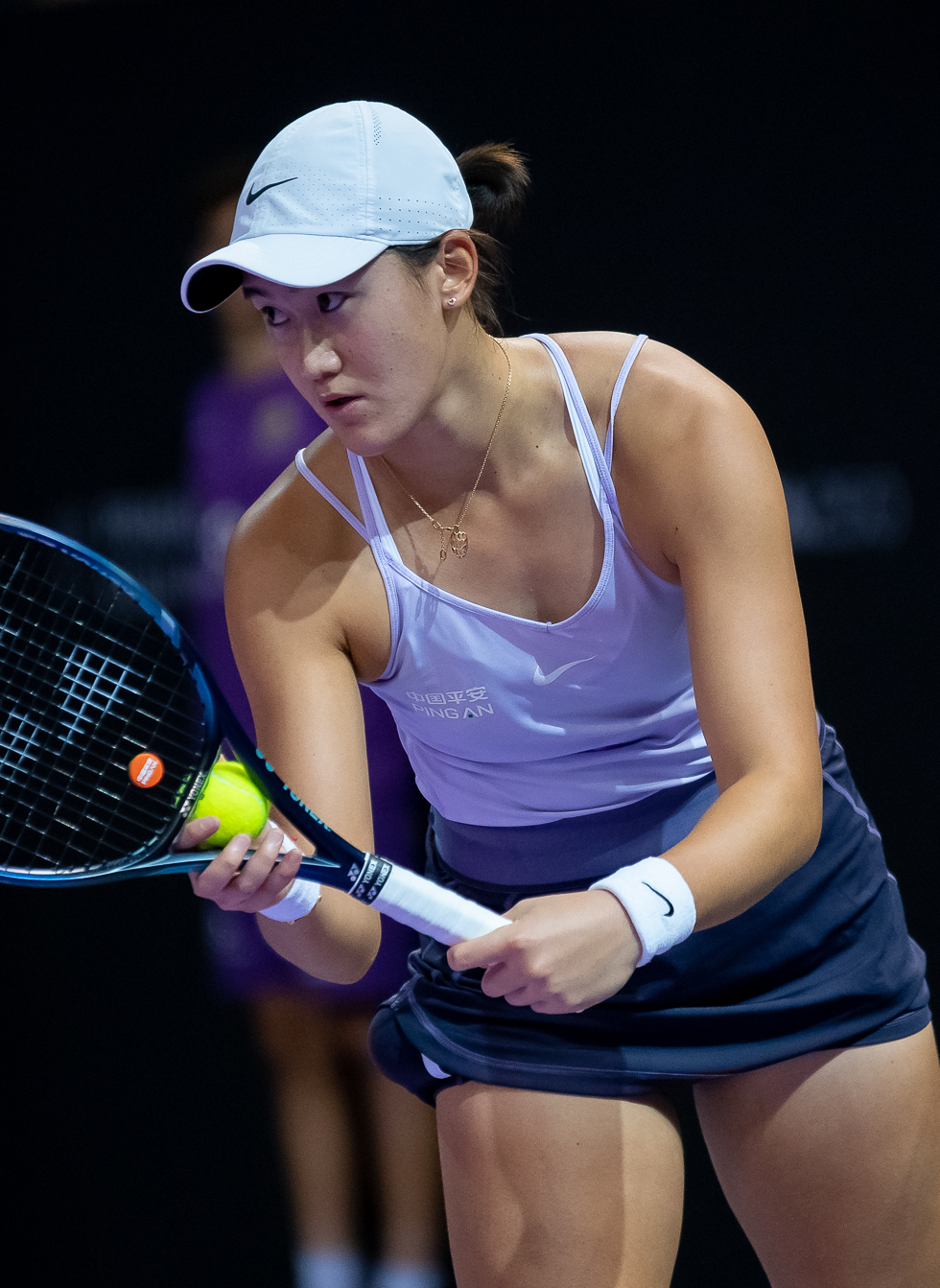
Wang at the 2022 Transylvania Open.

Wang started the year with a win over Sorana Cîrstea at the Shenzhen Open, but then lost to third seed Elise Mertens. However, she failed to reach the main draw of the Australian Open, Wang reached quarterfinals of the Hua Hin Championships, where she defeated world No. 15, Petra Martić. She followed this up with a semifinal at the Mexican Open; after three wins, she lost to Heather Watson.

At the Australian Open, she recorded her first major match win as a wildcard entrance against qualifier Viktória Kužmová, before losing to fourth seed Barbora Krejčíková in the second round.

She reached a new career-high singles ranking of 103, on 9 May 2022, and made her top 100 debut a month later on 13 June 2022, after reaching her first WTA 125 final at the Open Internacional de Valencia.

She made her debut at Wimbledon where she lost in the first round to another debutante at this major, Jule Niemeier.

At the Budapest Grand Prix, she defeated top seed Barbora Krejčíková in the first round and overcame Ana Bogdan in the longest straight-sets match of the year, in two hours and 45 minutes in the second round to move to the quarterfinals, where she was eliminated by Aleksandra Krunić.

In August, Wang defeated third seed Maria Sakkari to reach the third round of the US Open, before losing to Alison Riske-Amritraj, in three sets.

She ended the year ranked in the top 50 on 7 November 2022.

=== 2023: WTA 1000 fourth round, maiden WTA Tour title ===
At the Madrid, Wang defeated 23rd seed Bianca Andreescu in the second round, but lost her next match to 11th seed Barbora Krejčíková. She reached the fourth round of a WTA 1000 event for the first time at the Italian Open, before losing to countrywoman and 22nd seed Zheng Qinwen.

Wang won her maiden WTA Tour title in Guangzhou, defeating top seed Magda Linette in the final.

=== 2024–25: WTA Tour final, back to top 150 ===
She reached the final at the ATX Open, defeating top seed Anhelina Kalinina in the last four, but lost to fellow Chinese player Yuan Yue.

She won the W75 2025 Lexington Open, her first title in two years. As a result, she re-entered the top 150 in the rankings on 11 August 2025.

=== 2026: Major fourth round, Gold at Asian Games ===
Wang qualified for the main draw at the French Open and went on to make it through to the second week of a major event for the first time, at which point she lost to 18th seed Sorana Cîrstea. As a result, she returned to the top 100 on 8 June 2026, climbing 48 places.

At the Asian Games in Nagoya, Japan, Wang defeated top seed and world No. 18 Alexandra Eala in the semifinals, and then compatriot Zhang Shuai in the final to win the gold medal, also securing qualification for the 2028 Summer Olympics.

== Performance timelines ==
Key
W	F	SF	QF	#R	RR	Q#	P#	DNQ	A	Z#	PO	G	S	B	NMS	NTI	P	NH

(W) winner; (F) finalist; (SF) semifinalist; (QF) quarterfinalist; (#R) rounds 4, 3, 2, 1; (RR) round-robin stage; (Q#) qualification round; (P#) preliminary round; (DNQ) did not qualify; (A) absent; (Z#) Davis/Fed Cup Zonal Group (with number indication) or (PO) play-off; (G) gold, (S) silver or (B) bronze Olympic/Paralympic medal; (NMS) not a Masters tournament; (NTI) not a Tier I tournament; (P) postponed; (NH) not held; (SR) strike rate (events won / competed); (W–L) win–loss record.
To avoid confusion and double counting, these charts are updated at the conclusion of a tournament or when the player's participation has ended.

Only main-draw results in WTA Tour, Grand Slam tournaments, Billie Jean King Cup, Hopman Cup and Olympic Games are included in win–loss records.

=== Singles ===
Current through the 2026 Wuhan Open.

Tournament	2017	2018	2019	2020	2021	2022	2023	2024	2025	2026	SR	W–L	Win %
Grand Slam tournaments
Australian Open	A	A	Q2	Q3	A	2R	1R	1R	2R	A	0 / 4	2–4	33%
French Open	A	A	Q2	A	1R	Q2	1R	2R	Q3	4R	0 / 4	4–4	50%
Wimbledon	A	A	Q2	NH	Q2	1R	1R	1R	Q2	Q2	0 / 3	0–3	0%
US Open	A	A	1R	A	A	3R	2R	1R	1R	1R	0 / 6	3–6	33%
Win–loss	0–0	0–0	0–1	0–0	0–1	3–3	1–4	1–4	1–2	3–2	0 / 17	9–17	35%
National representation
Summer Olympics	NH				A	NH		3R	NH		0 / 1	2–1	67%
Billie Jean King Cup (Note: Formerly known as Fed Cup until 2020.)	A	A	A	PO (Note: Edition is split into the two years due to COVID-19.)		PO	A	PO	QF	QF	0 / 0	4–3	57%
WTA 1000 tournaments
Qatar Open	NTI	A	NTI	A	NTI	A	NTI	Q1	A	A	0 / 0	0–0	–
Dubai Championships	A	NTI	A	NTI	A	NTI	A	1R	A	A	0 / 1	0–1	0%
Indian Wells Open	A	A	Q1	NH	A	A	2R	1R	A	A	0 / 2	1–2	33%
Miami Open	A	Q1	2R	NH	1R	Q2	2R	2R	A	A	0 / 4	3–4	43%
Madrid Open	A	A	A	NH	Q2	A	3R	2R	A	A	0 / 2	3–2	60%
Italian Open	A	A	A	A	A	A	4R	1R	A	A	0 / 2	3–2	60%
Canadian Open	A	A	1R	NH	A	A	A	A	A	1R	0 / 2	0–2	0%
Cincinnati Open	A	A	A	A	A	A	1R	Q1	A	4R	0 / 2	2–2	50%
China Open	A	2R	1R	NH			1R	1R	2R	A	0 / 5	2–5	29%
Wuhan Open	A	A	A	NH				1R	2R	2R	0 / 3	2–3	40%
Win–loss	0–0	1–1	1–3	0–0	0–1	0–0	7–6	2–7	2–2	2–2	0 / 22	15–22	41%
Career statistics
	2017	2018	2019	2020	2021	2022	2023	2024	2025	2026	SR	W–L	Win %
Tournaments	1	3	7	3	7	10	25	23	9	6	Career total: 93		
Titles	0	0	0	0	0	0	1	0	0	0	Career total: 1		
Finals	0	0	0	0	0	0	1	1	0	0	Career total: 2		
Overall win–loss	1–1	1–3	2–7	6–3	4–7	13–11	16–24	21–23	3–9	6–6	1 / 94	73–93	44%
Year-end ranking	592	200	143	123	128	50	72	102	174		$3,552,737		

=== Doubles ===
Tournament	2022	2023	2024	SR	W–L	Win %
Australian Open	A	1R	2R	0 / 2	1–2	33%
French Open	A	A	2R	0 / 1	1–1	50%
Wimbledon	1R	1R	1R	0 / 3	0–3	0%
US Open	A	1R	1R	0 / 2	0–2	0%
Win–loss	0–1	0–3	2–4	0 / 8	2–8	20%

== WTA Tour finals ==
=== Singles: 2 (1 title, 1 runner-up) ===
Legend WTA 250 (1–1)	Finals by surface Hard (1–1)	Finals by setting Outdoor (1–1)

Result	W–L	Date	Tournament	Tier	Surface	Opponent	Score
Win	1–0	Sep 2023	Guangzhou Open, China	WTA 250	Hard	(Poland) Magda Linette	6–0, 6–2
Loss	1–1	Mar 2024	ATX Open, United States	WTA 250	Hard	(China) Yuan Yue	4–6, 6–7^{(4–7)}

== WTA 125 finals ==
=== Singles: 2 (runner-ups) ===
Result	W–L	Date	Tournament	Surface	Opponent	Score
Loss	0–1	Jun 2022	Internacional de Valencia, Spain	Clay	(China) Zheng Qinwen	4–6, 6–4, 3–6
Loss	0–2	Jun 2026	Internazionali di Brescia, Italy	Clay	(Egypt) Mayar Sherif	4–6, 3–6

== ITF Circuit finals ==
=== Singles: 14 (7 titles, 7 runner-ups) ===
Legend W100 tournaments (0–3) W60/75 tournaments (2–1) W50 tournaments (2–0) W25 tournaments (3–3)	Finals by surface Hard (5–4) Clay (2–3)

Result	W–L	Date	Tournament	Tier	Surface	Opponent	Score
Win	1–0	Aug 2018	ITF Nonthaburi, Thailand	W25	Hard	(Czech Republic) Barbora Štefková	6–3, 7–5
Loss	1–1	Aug 2018	ITF Nonthaburi, Thailand	W25	Hard	(China) Wang Xinyu	1–6, 6–4, 1–6
Win	2–1	Aug 2018	ITF Tsukuba, Japan	W25	Hard	(China) Zhang Kailin	3–6, 7–5, 7–5
Loss	2–2	Apr 2019	ITF Osaka, Japan	W25	Hard	(South Korea) Han Na-lae	5–7, 6–3, 3–6
Win	3–2	May 2019	Solgironès Open, Spain	W60	Clay	(Hungary) Dalma Gálfi	4–6, 6–3, 6–2
Loss	3–3	Oct 2021	ITF Florence, United States	W25	Hard	(Colombia) Emiliana Arango	3–6, 6–0, 6–7^{(0)}
Loss	3–4	Apr 2022	Clay Court Championships, United States	W100	Clay	(United States) Katie Volynets	4–6, 3–6
Loss	3–5	Apr 2022	Charlottesville Open, United States	W60	Clay	(United States) Louisa Chirico	4–6, 3–6
Loss	3–6	May 2022	ITF Charleston Pro, United States	W100	Clay	(United States) Taylor Townsend	3–6, 2–6
Loss	3–7	Sep 2023	Tokyo Open, Japan	W100	Hard	(Switzerland) Viktorija Golubic	4–6, 6–3, 4–6
Win	4–7	Jul 2025	Lexington Open, United States	W75	Hard	(Indonesia) Janice Tjen	3–6, 6–2, 6–4
Win	5–7	Mar 2026	ITF Maanshan, China	W35	Hard	Kristiana Sidorova	6–4, 7–5
Win	6–7	Mar 2026	ITF Maanshan, China	W50	Hard	(China) Guo Hanyu	6–2, 7–6^{(3)}
Win	7–7	Apr 2026	ITF Baotou, China	W50	Clay (i)	(Russia) Anastasia Zolotareva	6–2, 6–3

=== Doubles: 6 (3 titles, 3 runner-ups) ===
Legend $25,000 tournaments (3–1) $15,000 tournaments (0–2)	Finals by surface Hard (1–2) Clay (2–1)

Result	W–L	Date	Tournament	Tier	Surface	Partner	Opponents	Score
Loss	0–1	Sep 2017	ITF Hua Hin, Thailand	15,000	Hard	(Serbia) Natalija Kostić	(China) Zhuoma Ni Ma (China) Zhuoma You Mi	4–6, 3–6
Loss	0–2	Dec 2017	ITF Castellón, Spain	15,000	Clay	(China) Ren Jiaqi	(Spain) Yvonne Cavallé Reimers (Brazil) Luisa Stefani	3–6, 1–6
Win	1–2	Jun 2018	ITF Barcelona, Spain	25,000	Clay	(United States) Jessica Ho	(Brazil) Carolina Alves (France) Jade Suvrijn	6–3, 6–1
Win	2–2	Jun 2018	ITF Madrid, Spain	25,000	Clay (i)	(Paraguay) Montserrat González	(Russia) Anastasia Pribylova (Romania) Raluca Șerban	6–4, 7–6^{(4)}
Win	3–2	Aug 2018	ITF Nonthaburi, Thailand	25,000	Hard	(China) Wang Xinyu	(Australia) Destanee Aiava (Australia) Naiktha Bains	7–5, 5–7, [10–4]
Loss	3–3	Apr 2019	ITF Osaka, Japan	25,000	Hard	(Chinese Taipei) Hsu Ching-wen	(South Korea) Choi Ji-hee (South Korea) Han Na-lae	4–6, 7–5, [8–10]

== Junior Grand Slam tournament finals ==
=== Singles: 1 (title) ===
Result	Year	Tournament	Surface	Opponent	Score
Win	2018	US Open	Hard	(France) Clara Burel	7–6^{(4)}, 6–2

=== Doubles: 2 (1 title, 1 runner-up) ===
Result	Year	Tournament	Surface	Partner	Opponents	Score
Loss	2017	US Open	Hard	(Croatia) Lea Bošković	(Serbia) Olga Danilović (Ukraine) Marta Kostyuk	1–6, 5–7
Win	2018	Wimbledon	Grass	(China) Wang Xinyu	(United States) Caty McNally (United States) Whitney Osuigwe	6–2, 6–1

== Best Grand Slam results ==
=== Singles ===
Australian Open
2022 Australian Open (wildcard)
Round	Opponent	Rank	Score	WXR
1R	(Slovakia) Viktória Kužmová (Q)	No. 160	7–5, 6–3	No. 139
2R	(Czech Republic) Barbora Krejčíková (4)	No. 4	2–6, 3–6	No. 139
2025 Australian Open
Round	Opponent	Rank	Score	WXR
1R	(Austria) Julia Grabher (PR)	No. 415	6–1, 7–5	No. 108
2R	(United States) Emma Navarro (8)	No. 8	3–6, 6–3, 4–6	No. 108

Wimbledon Championships
2022 Wimbledon
Round	Opponent	Rank	Score	WXR
1R	(Germany) Jule Niemeier	No. 97	1–6, 4–6	No. 105
2023 Wimbledon
Round	Opponent	Rank	Score	WXR
1R	Mirra Andreeva (Q)	No. 102	4–6, 6–3, 5–7	No. 65
2024 Wimbledon
Round	Opponent	Rank	Score	WXR
1R	(Croatia) Donna Vekić	No. 37	6–3, 3–6, 4–6	No. 54

French Open
2026 French Open (qualifier)
Round	Opponent	Rank	Score	WXR
Q1	(France) Kristina Mladenovic (WC)	No. 860	6–3, 6–1	No. 148
Q2	(Australia) Storm Hunter	No. 193	6–2, 7–5	No. 148
Q3	(Uzbekistan) Polina Kudermetova (16)	No. 125	6–3, 6–3	No. 148
1R	(Montenegro) Danka Kovinić (PR)	N/R	6–3, 6–1	No. 148
2R	(United States) Hailey Baptiste (26)	No. 26	5–4 ret.	No. 148
3R	(Ukraine) Yuliia Starodubtseva	No. 55	6–3, 7–5	No. 148
4R	(Romania) Sorana Cîrstea (18)	No. 18	3–6, 6–7^{(4)}	No. 148

US Open
2022 US Open
Round	Opponent	Rank	Score	WXR
1R	(France) Diane Parry	No. 74	5–7, 6–3, 6–3	No. 75
2R	(Greece) Maria Sakkari (3)	No. 3	3–6, 7–5, 7–5	No. 75
3R	(United States) Alison Riske-Amritraj (29)	No. 29	4–6, 6–3, 4–6	No. 75

== Wins against top 10 players ==
Season	2022	Total
Wins	1	1

No.	Player	Rk	Event	Surface	Rd	Score	Rk	Years	Ref
1.	(Greece) Maria Sakkari	3	US Open, United States	Hard	2R	3–6, 7–5, 7–5	75	2022	

- Key: (Rk) first use, opponent rank; (Rd) round; (Rk) 2nd use, player rank; (Ref) reference; (F) final; (SF) semifinal; (QF) quarterfinal; (#R) rounds 4, 3, 2, 1; (RR) round-robin stage; (Q#) qualifying rounds or stages (3), 2, 1.
