= 2012 Blossom Cup – Singles =

Singles
- 2012 Blossom Cup

Final
- Champion: (Japan) Kimiko Date-Krumm
- Runner-up: (Hungary) Tímea Babos
- Score: 6–3, 6–3

Events
Singles	Doubles
← 2011 ·	Blossom Cup	· 2013 →

Lu Jingjing was the defending champion, but lost to the 3rd seeded Tetiana Luzhanska in the first round.

Japanese veteran Kimiko Date-Krumm won the title beating sixth seeded Tímea Babos 6–3, 6–3 in the final.

== Seeds ==
1. (Japan) Kimiko Date-Krumm (champion)
2. (China) Zhang Shuai (quarterfinals)
3. (United States) Tetiana Luzhanska (second round)
4. (France) Caroline Garcia (semifinals)
5. (Germany) Kathrin Wörle (second round)
6. (Hungary) Tímea Babos (final)
7. (Russia) Ekaterina Ivanova (quarterfinals)
8. (Japan) Yurika Sema (second round)

== Main draw ==
=== Key ===
- Q = Qualifier
- WC = Wild card
- LL = Lucky loser
- Alt = Alternate
- SE = Special exempt
- PR = Protected ranking
- ITF = ITF entry
- JE = Junior exempt
- w/o = Walkover
- r = Retired
- d = Defaulted
- SR = Special ranking

=== Finals ===
Semifinals
1	(Japan) Kimiko Date-Krumm	6	6
4	(France) Caroline Garcia	4	4
WC	(China) Zhou Yimiao	4	2
6	(Hungary) Tímea Babos	6	6

Final
1	(Japan) Kimiko Date-Krumm	6	6
6	(Hungary) Tímea Babos	3	3

=== Top half ===
First round
1	(Japan) K Date-Krumm	6^{7}	6	6
Q	(Montenegro) D Kovinić	7^{9}	2	2
(Japan) R Fujiwara	3	6	3
(Russia) O Puchkova	6	1	6
Q	(China) Y Duan	6	6
Q	(China) K Zhang	1	2
(Hong Kong) L Zhang	1	1
7	(Russia) E Ivanova	6	6
4	(France) C Garcia	7	6
(Japan) J Namigata	5	2
(Romania) M Gojnea	6	6
(United Kingdom) E Webley-Smith	0	2
(China) Q Wang	6	7
WC	(China) Y Xu	2	5
(Chinese Taipei) W-h Hsu	2	0
5	(Germany) K Wörle	6	6

Second round
1	(Japan) K Date-Krumm	6	6
(Russia) O Puchkova	4	3
Q	(China) Y Duan	5	3
7	(Russia) E Ivanova	7	6
4	(France) C Garcia	3	6	7
(Romania) M Gojnea	6	1	5
(China) Q Wang	7	2	6
5	(Germany) K Wörle	5	6	3

Quarterfinals
1	(Japan) K Date-Krumm	6	6
7	(Russia) E Ivanova	3	0
4	(France) C Garcia	6	6^{3}	6
(China) Q Wang	1	7^{7}	2

Semifinals
1	(Japan) K Date-Krumm	6	6
4	(France) C Garcia	4	4

=== Bottom half ===
First round
8	(Japan) Y Sema	1	6	7
(Israel) J Glushko	6	3	5
Q	(China) S Sun	2	7^{7}	6
(Slovakia) R Tabak	6	6^{3}	1
WC	(China) Y Zhou	7^{7}	6
WC	(China) Y Zhao	6^{5}	3
(China) J Lu	6^{1}	7^{7}	2
3	(United States) T Luzhanska	7^{7}	6^{1}	6
6	(Hungary) T Babos	6	6
WC	(China) X Han	1	4
(Japan) M Eguchi	5	6	4
(South Korea) S-j Kim	7	1	6
(Japan) A Omae	4	6	4
(Italy) A Floris	6	2	6
(Thailand) N Luangnam	2	3
2	(China) S Zhang	6	6

Second round
8	(Japan) Y Sema	6^{3}	6	4
Q	(China) S Sun	7^{7}	2	6
WC	(China) Y Zhou	6	6
3	(United States) T Luzhanska	1	2
6	(Hungary) T Babos	6	6
(South Korea) S-j Kim	2	1
(Italy) A Floris	1	2
2	(China) S Zhang	6	6

Quarterfinals
Q	(China) S Sun	4	1
WC	(China) Y Zhou	6	6
6	(Hungary) T Babos	6	6
2	(China) S Zhang	3	3

Semifinals
WC	(China) Y Zhou	4	2
6	(Hungary) T Babos	6	6

== Qualifying ==
=== Seeds ===
1. (Thailand) Luksika Kumkhum (qualifying competition)
2. (China) Yue-Yue Hu (first round)
3. (Georgia (country)) Oksana Kalashnikova (second round)
4. (China) Sun Shengnan (qualified)
5. (Montenegro) Danka Kovinic (qualified)
6. (China) Duan Yingying (qualified)
7. (Chinese Taipei) Chin-Wei Chan (qualifying competition)
8. (Japan) Chihiro Takayama (first round)

=== Qualifiers ===
1. (Montenegro) Danka Kovinic
2. (China) Kai-Lin Zhang
3. (China) Duan Yingying
4. (China) Sun Shengna.n

=== Draw ===
==== First qualifier ====
First round
1	(Thailand) Luksika Kumkhum	6	6
(Hong Kong) Wing-Yau Chan	3	0
(China) Chen Liang	6	6
(China) Chang Liu	1	2
(China) Wan-Ting Liu	6	0	0
(China) Xiao Zhou	3	6	6
(China) Ran Tian	2	0
5	(Montenegro) Danka Kovinic	6	6

Second round
1	(Thailand) Luksika Kumkhum	6	6
(China) Chen Liang	0	4
(China) Xiao Zhou	2	0
5	(Montenegro) Danka Kovinic	6	6

Qualifying competition
1	(Thailand) Luksika Kumkhum	2	4
5	(Montenegro) Danka Kovinic	6	6

==== Second qualifier ====
First round
2	(China) Yue-Yue Hu	5	6
(Serbia) Tamara Curovic	7	7
(China) Nan-Nan Zhang	4	3
(China) Kai-Lin Zhang	6	6
(China) Jia-Jing Lu	6	6
(China) Lin Zhu	2	2
(South Korea) So-Ra Lee	6	6
8	(Japan) Chihiro Takayama	4	4

Second round
(Serbia) Tamara Curovic	3	1
(China) Kai-Lin Zhang	6	6
(China) Jia-Jing Lu	7	1	6
(South Korea) So-Ra Lee	5	6	3

Qualifying competition
(China) Kai-Lin Zhang	6	6
(China) Jia-Jing Lu	1	1

==== Third qualifier ====
First round
3	(Georgia (country)) Oksana Kalashnikova	6	6
(China) Zhaoxuan Yang	4	3
(South Korea) Na-Lae Han	1	5
(China) Di Zhao	6	7
3	(China) Boyan Wang	3	2
(China) Jia Xiang Lu	6	6
(China) Yuxuan Zhang	5	2
6	(China) Duan Yingying	7	6

Second round
3	(Georgia (country)) Oksana Kalashnikova	3	3
(China) Di Zhao	6	6
(China) Jia Xiang Lu	3	1
6	(China) Duan Yingying	6	6

Qualifying competition
(China) Di Zhao	2	4
6	(China) Duan Yingying	6	6

==== Fourth qualifier ====
First round
4	(China) Sun Shengnan	7	7
(China) Lu Guo	5	5
(China) Zi Yang	6	6
(South Korea) Su Jeong Jang	3	4
(Thailand) Nungnadda Wannasuk	6	6
(Chinese Taipei) Shao-Yuan Kao	4	2
(China) Yi Zhong	2	4
7	(Chinese Taipei) Chin-Wei Chan	6	6

Second round
4	(China) Sun Shengnan	6	7
(China) Zi Yang	4	5
(Thailand) Nungnadda Wannasuk	6	4	2
6	(Chinese Taipei) Chin-Wei Chan	4	6	6

Qualifying competition
(China) Sun Shengnan	6	6
(Chinese Taipei) Chin-Wei Chan	1	3
