= 2015 Blossom Cup =

- Date: 23–29 March
- Edition: 7th
- Category: ITF Women's Circuit
- Prize money: $50,000
- Surface: Hard
- Location: Quanzhou, China
- Venue: Blossom Garden Tennis Center

Champions

Singles
- (Russia) Elizaveta Kulichkova

Doubles
- (Japan) Eri Hozumi / (Japan) Makoto Ninomiya
← 2014 ·	Blossom Cup	· 2016 →

The 2015 Blossom Cup is a professional tennis tournament played on outdoor hard courts. It is the seventh edition of the tournament which is part of the 2015 ITF Women's Circuit, offering a total of $50,000 in prize money. It takes place in Quanzhou, China, on 23–29 March 2015.

== Women's singles entrants ==
=== Seeds ===
Country	Player	Rank^{1}	Seed
CHN	Wang Qiang	91	1
POL	Magda Linette	108	2
CHN	Duan Yingying	112	3
THA	Luksika Kumkhum	124	4
JPN	Misa Eguchi	129	5
RUS	Elizaveta Kulichkova	147	6
CHN	Xu Yifan	157	7
CHN	Wang Yafan	158	8

- ^{1} Rankings as of 9 March 2015

=== Other entrants ===
The following players received wildcards into the singles main draw:

- (China) Liang Chen
- (China) Liu Chang
- (China) Zhang Yuxuan
- (China) Zhao Di

The following players received entry from the qualifying draw:

- (Chinese Taipei) Hsu Chieh-yu
- (Slovenia) Dalila Jakupović
- (Japan) Ayumi Morita
- (Switzerland) Jil Teichmann

The following player received entry by a junior exempt:

- (China) Xu Shilin

== Champions ==
=== Singles ===
- (Russia) Elizaveta Kulichkova def. (Latvia) Jeļena Ostapenko, 6–1, 5–7, 7–5

=== Doubles ===
- (Japan) Eri Hozumi / (Japan) Makoto Ninomiya def. (Japan) Hiroko Kuwata / (Japan) Junri Namigata, 6–3, 6–7^{(2–7)}, [10–2]
