= 2016 Blossom Cup – Singles =

Singles
- 2016 Blossom Cup

Final
- Champion: (China) Wang Qiang
- Runner-up: (China) Liu Fangzhou
- Score: 6–2, 6–2

Events
Singles	Doubles
← 2015 ·	Blossom Cup	· 2017 →

Elizaveta Kulichkova was the defending champion, but chose not to participate.

The top seed Wang Qiang won the title, defeating Liu Fangzhou in an all-Chinese final, 6–2, 6–2.

== Seeds ==
1. (China) Wang Qiang (champion)
2. (China) Wang Yafan (first round)
3. (China) Zhang Kailin (second round)
4. (Thailand) Luksika Kumkhum (semifinals)
5. (China) Zhu Lin (quarterfinals)
6. (China) Yang Zhaoxuan (second round)
7. (Belgium) Elise Mertens (quarterfinals)
8. (China) Zhang Yuxuan (second round)

== Main draw ==
=== Key ===
- Q = Qualifier
- WC = Wild card
- LL = Lucky loser
- Alt = Alternate
- SE = Special exempt
- PR = Protected ranking
- ITF = ITF entry
- JE = Junior exempt
- w/o = Walkover
- r = Retired
- d = Defaulted
- SR = Special ranking

=== Finals ===
Semifinals
1	(China) Wang Qiang	6	6
4	(Thailand) Luksika Kumkhum	3	0
(South Korea) Jang Su-jeong	2	0
(China) Liu Fangzhou	6	6

Final
1	(China) Wang Qiang	6	6
(China) Liu Fangzhou	2	2

=== Top half ===
First round
1	(China) Q Wang	6	6
(Japan) S Aoyama	2	0
(Japan) H Kuwata	6	6
(Uzbekistan) S Sharipova	2	3
WC	(China) Y Yuan	2	3
(India) A Raina	6	6
Q	(Thailand) P Plipuech	3	1
7	(Belgium) E Mertens	6	6
4	(Thailand) L Kumkhum	6	6
WC	(China) D Zhao	4	4
(Slovenia) D Jakupović	6	6
(France) I Ramialison	1	1
(China) J Lu	6	5	2
(China) C Liu	4	7	6
(Slovenia) T Majerič	1	1
6	(China) Z Yang	6	6

Second round
1	(China) Q Wang	6	7^{7}
(Japan) H Kuwata	0	6^{5}
(India) A Raina	4	5
7	(Belgium) E Mertens	6	7
4	(Thailand) L Kumkhum	4	7	6
(Slovenia) D Jakupović	6	5	4
(China) C Liu	6	6
6	(China) Z Yang	3	2

Quarterfinals
1	(China) Q Wang	4	6	6
7	(Belgium) E Mertens	6	3	3
4	(Thailand) L Kumkhum	7	6
(China) C Liu	5	0

Semifinals
1	(China) Q Wang	6	6
4	(Thailand) L Kumkhum	3	0

=== Bottom half ===
First round
5	(China) L Zhu	2	6	7
WC	(China) X You	6	1	5
Q	(China) S Guo	6	4	6
WC	(China) Q Ye	2	6	1
(South Korea) S-j Jang	7	6
(Japan) M Inoue	5	4
Q	(China) R Tian	4	4
3	(China) K Zhang	6	6
8	(China) Y Zhang	6	6
(Japan) R Sawayanagi	3	2
(Japan) M Ninomiya	1	6^{7}
Q	(China) X Gao	6	7^{9}
(China) F Liu	6	6
(Hong Kong) L Zhang	2	2
(Japan) M Eguchi	2	6	6
2	(China) Y Wang	6	4	4

Second round
5	(China) L Zhu	6	6
Q	(China) S Guo	3	1
(South Korea) S-j Jang	6	4	6
3	(China) K Zhang	3	6	2
8	(China) Y Zhang	6	2	5
Q	(China) X Gao	4	6	7
(China) F Liu	6	6
(Japan) M Eguchi	2	1

Quarterfinals
5	(China) L Zhu	6	4	3
(South Korea) S-j Jang	3	6	6
Q	(China) X Gao	2	3
(China) F Liu	6	6

Semifinals
(South Korea) S-j Jang	2	0
(China) F Liu	6	6
