= 2013 Blossom Cup =

- Date: 7–13 January
- Edition: 5th
- Category: ITF Women's Circuit
- Prize money: $50,000
- Surface: Hard
- Location: Quanzhou, China

Champions

Singles
- (Thailand) Varatchaya Wongteanchai

Doubles
- (Ukraine) Irina Buryachok / (Ukraine) Nadiya Kichenok
← 2012 ·	Blossom Cup	· 2014 →

The 2013 Blossom Cup was a professional tennis tournament played on outdoor hard courts. It was the fourth edition of the tournament which was part of the 2013 ITF Women's Circuit, offering a total of $50,000 in prize money. It took place in Quanzhou, China, on 7–13 January 2013.

== Singles main draw entrants ==
=== Seeds ===
Country	Player	Rank^{1}	Seed
UKR	Nadiya Kichenok	249	1
CHN	Xu Yifan	251	2
CHN	Sun Shengnan	254	3
TPE	Chan Chin-wei	267	4
JPN	Akiko Omae	277	5
THA	Noppawan Lertcheewakarn	280	6
CHN	Han Xinyun	288	7
JPN	Shuko Aoyama	295	8

- ^{1} Rankings as of 31 December 2012

=== Other entrants ===
The following players received wildcards into the singles main draw:

- (China) Lu Jingjing
- (China) Tian Ran
- (China) Yang Yi
- (China) Yang Zhaoxuan

The following players received entry from the qualifying draw:

- (China) Liu Fangzhou
- (Japan) Miki Miyamura
- (China) Tang Haochen
- (China) Wang Yafan

== Champions ==
=== Singles ===
- (Thailand) Varatchaya Wongteanchai def. (Ukraine) Nadiya Kichenok 6–2, 6–7^{(5–7)}, 7–6^{(7–5)}

=== Doubles ===
- (Ukraine) Irina Buryachok / (Ukraine) Nadiya Kichenok def. (China) Liang Chen / (China) Sun Shengnan 3–6, 6–3, [12–10]
