= 2016 Blossom Cup =

- Date: 21–27 March
- Edition: 8th
- Category: ITF Women's Circuit
- Prize money: $50,000
- Surface: Hard
- Location: Quanzhou, China

Champions

Singles
- (China) Wang Qiang

Doubles
- (Japan) Shuko Aoyama / (Japan) Makoto Ninomiya
← 2015 ·	Blossom Cup	· 2017 →

The 2016 Blossom Cup was a professional tennis tournament played on outdoor hard courts. It was the eighth edition of the tournament and part of the 2016 ITF Women's Circuit, offering a total of $50,000 in prize money. It took place in Quanzhou, China, on 21–27 March 2016.

== Singles main draw entrants ==
=== Seeds ===
Country	Player	Rank^{1}	Seed
CHN	Wang Qiang	96	1
CHN	Wang Yafan	135	2
CHN	Zhang Kailin	143	3
THA	Luksika Kumkhum	153	4
CHN	Zhu Lin	155	5
CHN	Yang Zhaoxuan	162	6
BEL	Elise Mertens	169	7
CHN	Zhang Yuxuan	182	8

- ^{1} Rankings as of 7 March 2016.

=== Other entrants ===
The following players received wildcards into the singles main draw:

- (China) Ye Qiuyu
- (China) You Xiaodi
- (China) Yuan Yue
- (China) Zhao Di

The following players received entry from the qualifying draw:

- (China) Gao Xinyu
- (China) Guo Shanshan
- (Thailand) Peangtarn Plipuech
- (China) Tian Ran

== Champions ==
=== Singles ===
- (China) Wang Qiang def. (China) Liu Fangzhou, 6–2, 6–2

=== Doubles ===
- (Japan) Shuko Aoyama / (Japan) Makoto Ninomiya def. (China) Lu Jingjing / (China) Zhang Yuxuan, 6–3, 6–0
