= 2014 Blossom Cup – Doubles =

Doubles
- 2014 Blossom Cup

Final
- Champions: (Chinese Taipei) Chan Chin-wei (China) Xu Yifan
- Runners-up: (China) Sun Ziyue (China) Xu Shilin
- Score: 7–6^{(7–4)}, 6–1

Events
Singles	Doubles
← 2013 ·	Blossom Cup	· 2015 →

Irina Buryachok and Nadiia Kichenok were the defending champions, but both players decided not to participate.

Chan Chin-wei and Xu Yifan won the title, defeating Sun Ziyue and Xu Shilin in the final, 7–6^{(7–4)}, 6–1.

== Seeds ==
1. (Chinese Taipei) Chan Chin-wei / (China) Xu Yifan (champions)
2. (Thailand) Nicha Lertpitaksinchai / (Thailand) Peangtarn Plipuech (first round)
3. (Thailand) Noppawan Lertcheewakarn / (Thailand) Varatchaya Wongteanchai (quarterfinals)
4. (Japan) Rika Fujiwara / (Japan) Eri Hozumi (quarterfinals)

== Draw ==
=== Key ===
- Q = Qualifier
- WC = Wild card
- LL = Lucky loser
- Alt = Alternate
- SE = Special exempt
- PR = Protected ranking
- ITF = ITF entry
- JE = Junior exempt
- w/o = Walkover
- r = Retired
- d = Defaulted
- SR = Special ranking

First round
1	(Chinese Taipei) C-w Chan (China) Y Xu	6	6
(Japan) J Namigata (Japan) M Tanaka	2	1
Alt	(Kazakhstan) K Kerimbayeva (Uzbekistan) S Sharipova	6	1	[13]
WC	(China) R Du (China) Y Hu	2	6	[11]
4	(Japan) R Fujiwara (China) E Hozumi	w/o
(Belgium) Y Bonaventure (China) Z Yang
(China) X Han (China) K Zhang	5	6	[3]
(China) R Tian (China) Y Wang	7	3	[10]
(China) C Liang (China) C Liu	2	3
WC	(China) Z Sun (China) S Xu	6	6
(Russia) N Dzalamidze (Russia) P Leykina	4	5
3	(Thailand) N Lertcheewakarn (Thailand) Vara Wongteanchai	6	7
(Serbia) B Bonić (Slovenia) D Jakupović	3	1
(Chinese Taipei) S-y Kao (Chinese Taipei) H-c Lee	6	6
WC	(China) J Chen (China) A Zhu	4	6	[10]
2	(Thailand) N Lertpitaksinchai (Thailand) Pe Plipuech	6	2	[8]

Quarterfinals
1	(Chinese Taipei) C-w Chan (China) Y Xu	6	6
Alt	(Kazakhstan) K Kerimbayeva (Uzbekistan) S Sharipova	3	2
4	(Japan) R Fujiwara (China) E Hozumi	1	5
(China) R Tian (China) Y Wang	6	7
WC	(China) Z Sun (China) S Xu	3	6	[10]
3	(Thailand) N Lertcheewakarn (Thailand) Vara Wongteanchai	6	3	[8]
(Chinese Taipei) S-y Kao (Chinese Taipei) H-c Lee	3	5
WC	(China) J Chen (China) A Zhu	6	7

Semifinals
1	(Chinese Taipei) C-w Chan (China) Y Xu	6	6
(China) R Tian (China) Y Wang	4	3
WC	(China) Z Sun (China) S Xu	7^{7}	6
WC	(China) J Chen (China) A Zhu	6^{4}	4

Final
1	(Chinese Taipei) C-w Chan (China) Y Xu	7^{7}	6
WC	(China) Z Sun (China) S Xu	6^{4}	1
