= 2015 Blossom Cup – Doubles =

Doubles
- 2015 Blossom Cup

Final
- Champions: (Japan) Eri Hozumi (Japan) Makoto Ninomiya
- Runners-up: (Japan) Hiroko Kuwata (Japan) Junri Namigata
- Score: 6–3, 6–7^{(2–7)}, [10–2]

Events
Singles	Doubles
← 2014 ·	Blossom Cup	· 2016 →

Chan Chin-wei and Xu Yifan were the defending champions, however they lost to the third seeds Hiroko Kuwata and Junri Namigata in the semifinals.

The fourth seeds Eri Hozumi and Makoto Ninomiya won the title, defeating Kuwata and Namigata in an all-Japanese final, 6–3, 6–7^{(2–7)}, [10–2].

== Seeds ==
1. (Chinese Taipei) Chuang Chia-jung / (China) Liang Chen (quarterfinals)
2. (Chinese Taipei) Chan Chin-wei / (China) Xu Yifan (semifinals)
3. (Japan) Hiroko Kuwata / (Japan) Junri Namigata (final)
4. (Japan) Eri Hozumi / (Japan) Makoto Ninomiya (champions)

== Draw ==
=== Key ===
- Q = Qualifier
- WC = Wild card
- LL = Lucky loser
- Alt = Alternate
- SE = Special exempt
- PR = Protected ranking
- ITF = ITF entry
- JE = Junior exempt
- w/o = Walkover
- r = Retired
- d = Defaulted
- SR = Special ranking

First round
1	(Chinese Taipei) C-j Chuang (China) C Liang	6	7^{8}
(United Kingdom) N Broady (Latvia) J Ostapenko	4	6^{6}
(China) Q Ye (Hong Kong) L Zhang	6	6
WC	(China) Yan Wang (China) X You	3	4
4	(Japan) E Hozumi (Japan) M Ninomiya	6	6
(Chinese Taipei) C-y Hsu (Serbia) N Stojanović	3	4
(China) C Liu (China) K Zhang	3	7^{7}	[11]
(Thailand) N Lertcheewakarn (Thailand) V Wongteanchai	6	6^{2}	[13]
(South Korea) N-l Han (Chinese Taipei) Y-h Lee	4	6	[10]
(Japan) R Fujiwara (Poland) M Linette	6	0	[5]
(China) R Tian (China) Z Yang	4	5
3	(Japan) H Kuwata (Japan) J Namigata	6	7
WC	(China) X Gao (China) Y Xin	2	6	[5]
WC	(China) J Chen (China) A Zhu	6	1	[10]
(Slovenia) D Jakupović (India) A Raina	2	3
2	(Chinese Taipei) C-w Chan (China) Y Xu	6	6

Quarterfinals
1	(Chinese Taipei) C-j Chuang (China) C Liang	3	2
(China) Q Ye (Hong Kong) L Zhang	6	6
4	(Japan) E Hozumi (Japan) M Ninomiya	6	6
(Thailand) N Lertcheewakarn (Thailand) V Wongteanchai	1	1
(South Korea) N-l Han (Chinese Taipei) Y-h Lee	3	6	[14]
3	(Japan) H Kuwata (Japan) J Namigata	6	3	[16]
WC	(China) J Chen (China) A Zhu	5	2
2	(Chinese Taipei) C-w Chan (China) Y Xu	7	6

Semifinals
(China) Q Ye (Hong Kong) L Zhang	7^{7}	3	[9]
4	(Japan) E Hozumi (Japan) M Ninomiya	6^{5}	6	[11]
3	(Japan) H Kuwata (Japan) J Namigata	4	7	[10]
2	(Chinese Taipei) C-w Chan (China) Y Xu	6	5	[7]

Final
4	(Japan) E Hozumi (Japan) M Ninomiya	6	6^{2}	[10]
3	(Japan) H Kuwata (Japan) J Namigata	3	7^{7}	[2]
