= 2013 Blossom Cup – Singles =

Singles
- 2013 Blossom Cup

Final
- Champion: (Thailand) Varatchaya Wongteanchai
- Runner-up: (Ukraine) Nadiia Kichenok
- Score: 6–2, 6–7^{(5–7)}, 7–6^{(7–5)}

Events
Singles	Doubles
← 2012 ·	Blossom Cup	· 2014 →

Kimiko Date-Krumm was the defending champion, but chose to compete at the 2013 Apia International Sydney instead.

Varatchaya Wongteanchai won the tournament, defeating Nadiia Kichenok in the final, 6–2, 6–7^{(5–7)}, 7–6^{(7–5)}.

== Seeds ==
1. (Ukraine) Nadiia Kichenok (final)
2. (China) Xu Yifan (second round)
3. (China) Sun Shengnan (first round)
4. (Chinese Taipei) Chan Chin-wei (semifinals)
5. (Japan) Akiko Omae (first round)
6. (Thailand) Noppawan Lertcheewakarn (second round)
7. (China) Han Xinyun (second round)
8. (Japan) Shuko Aoyama (first round)

== Main draw ==
=== Key ===
- Q = Qualifier
- WC = Wild card
- LL = Lucky loser
- Alt = Alternate
- SE = Special exempt
- PR = Protected ranking
- ITF = ITF entry
- JE = Junior exempt
- w/o = Walkover
- r = Retired
- d = Defaulted
- SR = Special ranking

=== Finals ===
Semifinals
1	(Ukraine) Nadiia Kichenok	6	4	6
4	(Chinese Taipei) Chan Chin-wei	2	6	2
(Thailand) Varatchaya Wongteanchai	7	7
WC	(China) Tian Ran	5	5

Final
1	(Ukraine) Nadiia Kichenok	2	7^{7}	6^{5}
(Thailand) Varatchaya Wongteanchai	6	6^{5}	7^{7}

=== Top half ===
First round
1	(Ukraine) N Kichenok	7^{7}	6
Q	(China) F Liu	6^{0}	3
(China) C Liang	3	7^{7}	1
Q	(Japan) M Miyamura	6	6^{3}	6
WC	(China) Y Yang	2	7	3
(China) Jia Lu	6	5	6
(China) C Liu	3	6	7
5	(Japan) A Omae	6	3	5
4	(Chinese Taipei) C-w Chan	6	6
(Chinese Taipei) H-c Lee	2	3
WC	(China) Jin Lu	2	6	6
(Chinese Taipei) W-h Hsu	6	2	1
(China) Zi Yang	7	6
(Russia) M Melnikova	5	3
(Japan) M Imanishi	7	4	0
7	(China) X Han	5	6	6

Second round
1	(Ukraine) N Kichenok	7	7
Q	(Japan) M Miyamura	5	5
(China) Jia Lu	6	6
(China) C Liu	2	4
4	(Chinese Taipei) C-w Chan	6	6
WC	(China) Jin Lu	1	1
(China) Zi Yang	6	6
7	(China) X Han	2	1

Quarterfinals
1	(Ukraine) N Kichenok	6	3	6
(China) Jia Lu	1	6	2
4	(Chinese Taipei) C-w Chan	7	6
(China) Zi Yang	5	4

Semifinals
1	(Ukraine) N Kichenok	6	4	6
4	(Chinese Taipei) C-w Chan	2	6	2

=== Bottom half ===
First round
8	(Japan) S Aoyama	5	1
(Thailand) V Wongteanchai	7	6
(Uzbekistan) N Abduraimova	6	6
(Japan) Y Higuchi	2	1
WC	(China) Zh Yang	1	4
Q	(China) Y Wang	6	6
(China) Y Zhao	7^{7}	6
3	(China) S Sun	6^{4}	3
6	(Thailand) N Lertcheewakarn	2	6	6
(Japan) M Inoue	6	2	2
WC	(China) R Tian	6	7^{7}
(Japan) R Ozaki	4	6^{5}
(Georgia (country)) O Kalashnikova	3	6	5
Q	(China) H Tang	6	3	7
(Ukraine) I Buryachok	7	5	3
2	(China) Y Xu	5	7	6

Second round
(Thailand) V Wongteanchai	6	6
(Uzbekistan) N Abduraimova	3	3
Q	(China) Y Wang	3	6	6
(China) Y Zhao	6	3	3
6	(Thailand) N Lertcheewakarn	5	7^{7}	4
WC	(China) R Tian	7	6^{5}	6
Q	(China) H Tang	6	6
2	(China) Y Xu	1	2

Quarterfinals
(Thailand) V Wongteanchai	4	6	6
Q	(China) Y Wang	6	4	2
WC	(China) R Tian	6	6
Q	(China) H Tang	1	1

Semifinals
(Thailand) V Wongteanchai	7	7
WC	(China) R Tian	5	5
