= 2013 Blossom Cup – Doubles =

Doubles
- 2013 Blossom Cup

Final
- Champions: (Ukraine) Irina Buryachok (Ukraine) Nadiya Kichenok
- Runners-up: (China) Liang Chen (China) Sun Shengnan
- Score: 3–6, 6–3, [12–10]

Events
Singles	Doubles
← 2012 ·	Blossom Cup	· 2014 →

Chan Hao-ching and Rika Fujiwara were the defending champions, but both players chose not to participate.

Irina Buryachok and Nadiya Kichenok won the tournament, defeating Liang Chen and Sun Shengnan in the final, 3–6, 6–3, [12–10].

== Seeds ==
1. (Japan) Shuko Aoyama / (China) Xu Yifan (first round)
2. (Georgia (country)) Oksana Kalashnikova / (Thailand) Noppawan Lertcheewakarn (semifinals)
3. (Ukraine) Irina Buryachok / (Ukraine) Nadiya Kichenok (champions)
4. (China) Han Xinyun / (Thailand) Varatchaya Wongteanchai (first round)

== Draw ==
=== Key ===
- Q = Qualifier
- WC = Wild card
- LL = Lucky loser
- Alt = Alternate
- SE = Special exempt
- PR = Protected ranking
- ITF = ITF entry
- JE = Junior exempt
- w/o = Walkover
- r = Retired
- d = Defaulted
- SR = Special ranking

First round
1	(Japan) S Aoyama (China) Y Xu	4	6	[7]
(Japan) A Inoue (Japan) M Miyamura	6	2	[10]
(China) W Liu (China) Z Yang	6	6
WC	(China) Y Wang (China) Y Zhao	2	0
3	(Ukraine) I Buryachok (Ukraine) N Kichenok	6	6
(China) H Tang (China) R Tian	4	1
(Uzbekistan) N Abduraimova (Russia) M Melnikova	6	6
WC	(China) J Mei (China) K Zhang	1	3
(Chinese Taipei) C-w Chan (China) C Liu	5	6	[10]
(Chinese Taipei) S-y Kao (Chinese Taipei) H-c Lee	7	1	[6]
(China) C Liang (China) S Sun	5	6	[10]
4	(China) X Han (Thailand) V Wongteanchai	7	4	[6]
WC	(China) T Li (China) Jin Lu	7^{7}	6
Alt	(Japan) Y Higuchi (Japan) M Inoue	6^{4}	1
(China) Jiaj Lu (China) Jiax Lu	4	1
2	(Georgia (country)) O Kalashnikova (Thailand) N Lertcheewakarn	6	6

Quarterfinals
(Japan) A Inoue (Japan) M Miyamura	2	7^{7}	[13]
(China) W Liu (China) Z Yang	6	6^{3}	[11]
3	(Ukraine) I Buryachok (Ukraine) N Kichenok	6	6
(Uzbekistan) N Abduraimova (Russia) M Melnikova	3	4
(Chinese Taipei) C-w Chan (China) C Liu	3	1
(China) C Liang (China) S Sun	6	6
WC	(China) T Li (China) Jin Lu	1	1
2	(Georgia (country)) O Kalashnikova (Thailand) N Lertcheewakarn	6	6

Semifinals
(Japan) A Inoue (Japan) M Miyamura	2	6	[6]
3	(Ukraine) I Buryachok (Ukraine) N Kichenok	6	2	[10]
(China) C Liang (China) S Sun	4	6	[10]
2	(Georgia (country)) O Kalashnikova (Thailand) N Lertcheewakarn	6	1	[6]

Final
3	(Ukraine) I Buryachok (Ukraine) N Kichenok	3	6	[12]
(China) C Liang (China) S Sun	6	3	[10]
