= 2015 Blossom Cup – Singles =

Singles
- 2015 Blossom Cup

Final
- Champion: (Russia) Elizaveta Kulichkova
- Runner-up: (Latvia) Jeļena Ostapenko
- Score: 6–1, 5–7, 7–5

Events
Singles	Doubles
← 2014 ·	Blossom Cup	· 2016 →

Zarina Diyas was the defending champion, however she chose to participate at the 2015 Miami Open instead.

Elizaveta Kulichkova won the title, defeating Jeļena Ostapenko in the final, 6–1, 5–7, 7–5.

== Seeds ==
1. (China) Wang Qiang (second round)
2. (Poland) Magda Linette (semifinals)
3. (China) Duan Yingying (second round)
4. (Thailand) Luksika Kumkhum (first round)
5. (Japan) Misa Eguchi (first round)
6. (Russia) Elizaveta Kulichkova (champion)
7. (China) Xu Yifan (second round)
8. (China) Wang Yafan (first round)

== Main draw ==
=== Key ===
- Q = Qualifier
- WC = Wild card
- LL = Lucky loser
- Alt = Alternate
- SE = Special exempt
- PR = Protected ranking
- ITF = ITF entry
- JE = Junior exempt
- w/o = Walkover
- r = Retired
- d = Defaulted
- SR = Special ranking

=== Finals ===
Semifinals
(Latvia) Jeļena Ostapenko	6	7
(China) Liu Fangzhou	2	5
6	(Russia) Elizaveta Kulichkova	6	6
2	(Poland) Magda Linette	1	0

Final
(Latvia) Jeļena Ostapenko	1	7	5
6	(Russia) Elizaveta Kulichkova	6	5	7

=== Top half ===
First round
1	(China) Q Wang	6	7
JE	(China) S Xu	1	5
(Latvia) J Ostapenko	6	6
(Thailand) V Wongteanchai	4	1
(China) Z Yang	6	6
Q	(Slovenia) D Jakupović	0	4
WC	(China) C Liu	2	6	6
5	(Japan) M Eguchi	6	1	2
4	(Thailand) L Kumkhum	3	5
(Thailand) T Tanasugarn	6	7
Q	(Japan) A Morita	1	1
(Japan) E Hozumi	6	6
(Switzerland) V Golubic	5	6	3
(Japan) H Kuwata	7	2	6
(China) F Liu	7^{7}	6
8	(China) Y Wang	6^{4}	3

Second round
1	(China) Q Wang	6	3	1
(Latvia) J Ostapenko	0	6	6
(China) Z Yang	6	6
WC	(China) C Liu	1	3
(Thailand) T Tanasugarn	4	2
(Japan) E Hozumi	6	6
(Japan) H Kuwata	6^{6}	6	4
(China) F Liu	7^{8}	2	6

Quarterfinals
(Latvia) J Ostapenko	5	6	6
(China) Z Yang	7	4	2
(Japan) E Hozumi	1	0
(China) F Liu	6	6

Semifinals
(Latvia) J Ostapenko	6	7
(China) F Liu	2	5

=== Bottom half ===
First round
6	(Russia) E Kulichkova	6	6
WC	(China) Y Zhang	3	3
(Japan) J Namigata	5	6	2
(Japan) R Ozaki	7	3	6
WC	(China) C Liang	3	3
(China) K Zhang	6	6
(United Kingdom) N Broady	6^{5}	6	4
3	(China) Y Duan	7^{7}	3	6
7	(China) Y Xu	6	7
(Japan) M Imanishi	0	5
(Hong Kong) L Zhang	6	7
Q	(Switzerland) J Teichmann	3	5
(Slovenia) T Majerič	6	1	6^{5}
WC	(China) D Zhao	3	6	7^{7}
Q	(Chinese Taipei) C-y Hsu	1	0
2	(Poland) M Linette	6	6

Second round
6	(Russia) E Kulichkova	6	6
(Japan) R Ozaki	4	2
(China) K Zhang	6	6
3	(China) Y Duan	4	2
7	(China) Y Xu	3	5
(Hong Kong) L Zhang	6	7
WC	(China) D Zhao	2	1
2	(Poland) M Linette	6	6

Quarterfinals
6	(Russia) E Kulichkova	6	6
(China) K Zhang	0	3
(Hong Kong) L Zhang	1	3
2	(Poland) M Linette	6	6

Semifinals
6	(Russia) E Kulichkova	6	6
2	(Poland) M Linette	1	0

== Sources ==
- Main draw
