= 2016 Blossom Cup – Doubles =

Doubles
- 2016 Blossom Cup

Final
- Champions: (Japan) Shuko Aoyama (Japan) Makoto Ninomiya
- Runners-up: (China) Lu Jingjing (China) Zhang Yuxuan
- Score: 6–3, 6–0

Events
Singles	Doubles
← 2015 ·	Blossom Cup	· 2017 →

Eri Hozumi and Makoto Ninomiya were the defending champions, but Hozumi chose to participate in Canberra instead. Ninomiya partnered Shuko Aoyama and successfully defended her title, they defeated Chinese wildcards Lu Jingjing and Zhang Yuxuan in the final, 6–3, 6–0.

== Seeds ==
1. (Japan) Shuko Aoyama / (Japan) Makoto Ninomiya (champions)
2. (Belgium) Elise Mertens / (United Kingdom) Emily Webley-Smith (first round)
3. (Chinese Taipei) Chan Chin-wei / (China) Liu Chang (quarterfinals)
4. (Japan) Hiroko Kuwata / (Japan) Kotomi Takahata (semifinals)

== Draw ==
=== Key ===
- Q = Qualifier
- WC = Wild card
- LL = Lucky loser
- Alt = Alternate
- SE = Special exempt
- PR = Protected ranking
- ITF = ITF entry
- JE = Junior exempt
- w/o = Walkover
- r = Retired
- d = Defaulted
- SR = Special ranking

First round
1	(Japan) S Aoyama (Japan) M Ninomiya	6	6
(South Korea) J-h Choi (South Korea) S-j Jang	0	1
(Japan) M Eguchi (Japan) R Sawayanagi	6	6
(Thailand) N Lertpitaksinchai (Thailand) P Plipuech	4	3
4	(Japan) H Kuwata (Japan) K Takahata	6	6
(Japan) M Ayukawa (Japan) M Inoue	2	2
(China) Q Ye (Hong Kong) L Zhang	6	6^{6}	[5]
WC	(China) X Gao (China) F Xun	3	7^{8}	[10]
WC	(China) R Tian (China) Yan Wang	6	2	[8]
WC	(China) J Lu (China) Y Zhang	4	6	[10]
(Thailand) L Kumkhum (Belarus) L Marozava	2	5
3	(Chinese Taipei) C-w Chan (China) C Liu	6	7
(China) W Liu (China) Z Yang	6	6
(Slovenia) T Majerič (India) A Raina	3	2
(China) X You (China) L Zhu	6	2	[10]
2	(Belgium) E Mertens (United Kingdom) E Webley-Smith	1	6	[3]

Quarterfinals
1	(Japan) S Aoyama (Japan) M Ninomiya	6	6
(Japan) M Eguchi (Japan) R Sawayanagi	4	3
4	(Japan) H Kuwata (Japan) K Takahata	6	7
WC	(China) X Gao (China) F Xun	1	5
WC	(China) J Lu (China) Y Zhang	6	7^{8}
3	(Chinese Taipei) C-w Chan (China) C Liu	3	6^{6}
(China) W Liu (China) Z Yang	6^{4}	6	[6]
(China) X You (China) L Zhu	7^{7}	4	[10]

Semifinals
1	(Japan) S Aoyama (Japan) M Ninomiya	6	6
4	(Japan) H Kuwata (Japan) K Takahata	2	2
WC	(China) J Lu (China) Y Zhang	4	6	[10]
(China) X You (China) L Zhu	6	4	[8]

Final
1	(Japan) S Aoyama (Japan) M Ninomiya	6	6
WC	(China) J Lu (China) Y Zhang	3	0
