= 2014 Blossom Cup =

- Date: 3–9 March
- Edition: 6th
- Category: ITF Women's Circuit
- Prize money: $50,000
- Surface: Hard
- Location: Quanzhou, China

Champions

Singles
- (Kazakhstan) Zarina Diyas

Doubles
- (Chinese Taipei) Chan Chin-wei / (China) Xu Yifan
← 2013 ·	Blossom Cup	· 2015 →

The 2014 Blossom Cup was a professional tennis tournament played on outdoor hard courts. It was the sixth edition of the tournament and part of the 2014 ITF Women's Circuit, offering a total of $50,000 in prize money. It took place in Quanzhou, China, on 3–9 March 2014.

== Singles main draw entrants ==
=== Seeds ===
Country	Player	Rank^{1}	Seed
KAZ	Zarina Diyas	113	1
CHN	Zheng Saisai	144	2
JPN	Eri Hozumi	174	3
RUS	Ksenia Pervak	176	4
CHN	Duan Yingying	189	5
THA	Noppawan Lertcheewakarn	221	6
CHN	Wang Qiang	248	7
JPN	Junri Namigata	259	8

- ^{1} Rankings as of 24 February 2014

=== Other entrants ===
The following players received wildcards into the singles main draw:

- (China) Sun Ziyue
- (China) Tang Haochen
- (China) Tian Ran
- (China) Xu Shilin

The following players received entry from the qualifying draw:

- (China) Liu Chang
- (Japan) Michika Ozeki
- (Thailand) Varatchaya Wongteanchai
- (China) Xu Yifan

The following player received entry into the singles main draw as a lucky loser:

- (Russia) Polina Leykina

== Champions ==
=== Singles ===
- (Kazakhstan) Zarina Diyas def. (Thailand) Noppawan Lertcheewakarn 6–1, 6–1

=== Doubles ===
- (Chinese Taipei) Chan Chin-wei / (China) Xu Yifan def. (China) Sun Ziyue / (China) Xu Shilin 7–6^{(7–4)}, 6–1
