= 2013 Australian Open – Main draw wildcard entries =

- Date: December - January
- Edition: 101st
- Category: Grand Slam (ITF)
- Location: Nanjing, Jiangsu Province, China; Melbourne, Victoria, Australia; Atlanta, Georgia, United States
← 2012 ·	Australian Open – Main draw wildcard entries	· 2014 →

The 2013 Australian Open wildcard playoffs and entries were a group of events and internal selections to choose the eight men and women wildcard entries for the 2013 Australian Open. Tennis Australia awarded eight wildcards for the men's and women's professional singles and doubles competitions. In an agreement with the United States Tennis Association and the French Tennis Federation, Tennis Australia gave one man and one woman from the United States and France each a wildcard into the Australian Open. A wildcard was awarded to the winner of the Australian Open wildcard playoff, a tournament between Australian players, who do not receive direct entry into the draw. The Australian Open were promoted as "the Grand Slam of Asia/Pacific"; one male and one female player from this geographical area were awarded a wildcard. This was decided through the Asia Pacific Australian Open Wildcard Playoff.

== Wildcard entries ==
These are the wildcard qualifiers, from both internal selections and playoffs.

=== Men's singles ===
Country	Name	Method of Qualification
CHN	Wu Di	Asia-Pacific Wildcard - Playoff
AUS	Benjamin Mitchell	Australian Wildcard - Playoff
USA	Rhyne Williams	USA Wildcard - Playoff
FRA	Josselin Ouanna	French Wildcard - Internal Selection
AUS	John Millman	Australian Wildcard - Internal Selection
AUS	Luke Saville	Australian Wildcard - Internal Selection
AUS	James Duckworth	Australian Wildcard - Internal Selection
AUS	John-Patrick Smith	Australian Wildcard - Internal Selection

=== Women's singles ===
Country	Name	Method of Qualification
CHN	Zhang Yuxuan	Asia-Pacific Wildcard - Playoff
AUS	Bojana Bobusic	Australian Wildcard - Playoff
USA	Madison Keys	USA Wildcard - Playoff
FRA	Caroline Garcia	French Wildcard - Internal Selection
AUS	Ashleigh Barty	Australian Wildcard - Internal Selection
AUS	Olivia Rogowska	Australian Wildcard - Internal Selection
AUS	Jarmila Gajdošová	Australian Wildcard - Internal Selection
AUS	Sacha Jones	Australian Wildcard - Internal Selection

=== Men's doubles ===
Country	Name	Method of Qualification
THA; TPE	Danai Udomchoke; Jimmy Wang	Asia-Pacific Wildcard - Playoff

=== Women's doubles ===
Country	Name	Method of Qualification
CHN; CHN	Han Xinyun; Zhou Yimiao	Asia-Pacific Wildcard - Playoff

== Asia-Pacific Wildcard Playoff ==
=== Men's singles ===
Quarterfinals
1	(Japan) Yuichi Sugita	6
(China) Li Zhe	3^{r}
4	(China) Zhang Ze	6^{5}	2
(China) Wu Di	7^{7}	6
(India) Vishnu Vardhan
3	(Thailand) Danai Udomchoke	w/o
(India) Yuki Bhambri	2	3
2	(Chinese Taipei) Jimmy Wang	6	6

Semifinals
1	(Japan) Yuichi Sugita	1	1
(China) Wu Di	6	6
3	(Thailand) Danai Udomchoke	6	6
2	(Chinese Taipei) Jimmy Wang	2	2

Final
(China) Wu Di	7^{7}	6
3	(Thailand) Danai Udomchoke	6^{1}	4

=== Women's singles ===
Quarterfinals
1	(Chinese Taipei) Chang Kai-chen	6	4	1
Q	(China) Zhang Yuxuan	2	6	6
(Chinese Taipei) Chan Chin-wei	6	3	6
4	(China) Han Xinyun	1	6	2
(China) Xu Yifan	0	3
3	(Thailand) Luksika Kumkhum	6	6
(China) Liang Chen	2	4
2	(China) Wang Qiang	6	6

Semifinals
Q	(China) Zhang Yuxuan	7	6
(Chinese Taipei) Chan Chin-wei	5	0
3	(Thailand) Luksika Kumkhum	4	2
2	(China) Wang Qiang	6	6

Final
Q	(China) Zhang Yuxuan	6	6
2	(China) Wang Qiang	4	2

=== Men's doubles ===
Quarterfinals
1	(India) Yuki Bhambri (India) Divij Sharan	6^{1}	4
(China) Gong Maoxin (China) Zhang Ze	7^{7}	6
4	(Thailand) Danai Udomchoke (Chinese Taipei) Jimmy Wang	6	6
(India) N. Sriram Balaji (India) Sanam Singh	4	1
(China) Wu Di (China) Zhang Zhizhen	6	7
3	(India) Purav Raja (India) Vishnu Vardhan	4	5
(China) Li Yifeng (China) Xue Feng	3	4
2	(Chinese Taipei) Lee Hsin-han (Chinese Taipei) Peng Hsien-yin	6	6

Semifinals
(China) Gong Maoxin (China) Zhang Ze	5	5
4	(Thailand) Danai Udomchoke (Chinese Taipei) Jimmy Wang	7	7
(China) Wu Di (China) Zhang Zhizhen	3	2
2	(Chinese Taipei) Lee Hsin-han (Chinese Taipei) Peng Hsien-yin	6	6

Final
4	(Thailand) Danai Udomchoke (Chinese Taipei) Jimmy Wang	6	6
2	(Chinese Taipei) Lee Hsin-han (Chinese Taipei) Peng Hsien-yin	4	3

=== Women's doubles ===
Quarterfinals
1	(China) Liu Wanting (China) Sun Shengnan	6	6
(China) Chen Jiahui (China) Huang Jialu	1	2
4	(China) Han Xinyun (China) Zhou Yimiao	6	6
(China) Wang Yafan (China) Zhu Aiwen	1	2
(China) Li Ting (China) Wang Qiang	2	4
3	(Thailand) Luksika Kumkhum (Thailand) Varatchaya Wongteanchai	6	6
(China) Deng Mengning (China) Zhao Qianqian	0	2
2	(China) Liang Chen (China) Xu Yifan	6	6

Semifinals
1	(China) Liu Wanting (China) Sun Shengnan	5	3
4	(China) Han Xinyun (China) Zhou Yimiao	7	6
3	(Thailand) Luksika Kumkhum (Thailand) Varatchaya Wongteanchai	5	4
2	(China) Liang Chen (China) Xu Yifan	7	6

Final
4	(China) Han Xinyun (China) Zhou Yimiao	7	6
2	(China) Liang Chen (China) Xu Yifan	5	4

== Australian Wildcard Playoff ==
=== Men's singles ===
First round
1	(Australia) Samuel Groth	4	2	6	3
(Australia) Nicholas Kyrgios	6	6	3	6
(Australia) Thanasi Kokkinakis	1	3	7	6^{7}
8	(Australia) Matthew Barton	6	6	5	7^{9}
4	(Australia) Adam Feeney	6	7	6
(Australia) John Peers	3	5	4
(Australia) Bradley Mousley	3	0	2
5	(Australia) Benjamin Mitchell	6	6	6
6	(Australia) Luke Saville	6	6	7^{16}
(Australia) Andrew Whittington	4	2	6^{14}
(Australia) Jacob Grills	6	6	2	2	1
3	(Australia) Matt Reid	3	3	6	6	6
7	(Australia) Greg Jones	2	4	7	6	6
(Australia) Michael Look	6	6	5	4	4
(Australia) Jay Andrijic	2	5	1
2	(Australia) John-Patrick Smith	6	7	6

Quarterfinals
(Australia) Nicholas Kyrgios	6^{3}	6	3	7^{7}	4^{r}
8	(Australia) Matthew Barton	7^{7}	3	6	6^{5}	3
4	(Australia) Adam Feeney	6	2	5	0
5	(Australia) Benjamin Mitchell	3	6	7	6
6	(Australia) Luke Saville	6^{4}	2	3
3	(Australia) Matt Reid	7^{7}	6	6
7	(Australia) Greg Jones	4	6	6^{6}	4
2	(Australia) John-Patrick Smith	6	3	7^{8}	6

Semifinals
8	(Australia) Matthew Barton	3	6^{0}	7^{7}	6	7
5	(Australia) Benjamin Mitchell	6	7^{7}	6^{5}	3	9
3	(Australia) Matt Reid	6	6	4	6
2	(Australia) John-Patrick Smith	4	3	6	3

Finals
5	(Australia) Benjamin Mitchell	6	7^{7}	3	6
3	(Australia) Matt Reid	3	6^{5}	6	4

Draw

=== Women's singles ===
First round
1	(Australia) Olivia Rogowska	6^{3}	3
(Australia) Tammi Patterson	7^{7}	6
(Australia) Priscilla Hon	4	7^{7}	6
6	(Australia) Sally Peers	6	6^{2}	3
3	(Australia) Monique Adamczak	6	6
(Australia) Abbie Myers	2	4
(Australia) Lizette Cabrera	1	3
7	(Australia) Viktorija Rajicic	6	6
8	(Australia) Jessica Moore	6	6
(Australia) Naiktha Bains	1	4
(Australia) Azra Hadzic	2	0
4	(Australia) Arina Rodionova	6	6
5	(Australia) Bojana Bobusic	6	6
(Australia) Storm Sanders	2	3
(Australia) Ashley Keir	1	2
2	(Australia) Ashleigh Barty	6	6

Quarterfinals
(Australia) Tammi Patterson	3	7^{7}	6
(Australia) Priscilla Hon	6	6^{5}	4
3	(Australia) Monique Adamczak	6	6
7	(Australia) Viktorija Rajicic	2	4
8	(Australia) Jessica Moore	5	3
4	(Australia) Arina Rodionova	7	6
5	(Australia) Bojana Bobusic	3	6	6
2	(Australia) Ashleigh Barty	6	3	4

Semifinals
(Australia) Tammi Patterson	1	3
3	(Australia) Monique Adamczak	6	6
4	(Australia) Arina Rodionova	4	2
5	(Australia) Bojana Bobusic	6	6

Final
3	(Australia) Monique Adamczak	1	3
5	(Australia) Bojana Bobusic	6	6

Draw

== US Wildcard Playoff ==
=== Men's singles ===
Quarterfinals
1	(United States) Tim Smyczek	7^{7}	6
(United States) Christian Harrison	6^{3}	1
(United States) Bradley Klahn	3	3
4	(United States) Tennys Sandgren	6	6
3	(United States) Rhyne Williams	6	6
(United States) Daniel Kosakowski	1	4
(United States) Chase Buchanan	3	6^{4}
2	(United States) Denis Kudla	6	7^{7}

Semifinals
1	(United States) Tim Smyczek	6	6
4	(United States) Tennys Sandgren	2	2
3	(United States) Rhyne Williams	5	7^{7}	6
2	(United States) Denis Kudla	7	6^{4}	1

Finals
1	(United States) Tim Smyczek	6^{4}	7	3	3
3	(United States) Rhyne Williams	7^{7}	5	6	6

=== Women's singles ===
Quarterfinals
1	(United States) Julia Cohen	3	4
(United States) Grace Min	6	6
(United States) Irina Falconi	2	5
4	(United States) Mallory Burdette	6	7
3	(United States) Madison Keys	6	6
(United States) Bethanie Mattek-Sands	2	4
(United States) Alison Riske	1	2
2	(United States) Alexa Glatch	6	6

Semifinals
(United States) Grace Min	2	6^{7}
4	(United States) Mallory Burdette	6	7^{9}
3	(United States) Madison Keys	6	6
2	(United States) Alexa Glatch	0	1

Finals
4	(United States) Mallory Burdette	5	3
3	(United States) Madison Keys	7	6
