= 2014 Blossom Cup – Singles =

Singles
- 2014 Blossom Cup

Final
- Champion: (Kazakhstan) Zarina Diyas
- Runner-up: (Thailand) Noppawan Lertcheewakarn
- Score: 6–1, 6–1

Events
Singles	Doubles
← 2013 ·	Blossom Cup	· 2015 →

Varatchaya Wongteanchai was the defending champion, having won the event in 2013, but lost in the first round to Dalila Jakupović.

Zarina Diyas won the tournament, defeating Noppawan Lertcheewakarn in the final, 6–1, 6–1.

== Seeds ==
1. (Kazakhstan) Zarina Diyas (champion)
2. (China) Zheng Saisai (first round)
3. (Japan) Eri Hozumi (quarterfinals)
4. (Russia) Ksenia Pervak (semifinals; retired)
5. (China) Duan Yingying (semifinals; retired)
6. (Thailand) Noppawan Lertcheewakarn (final)
7. (China) Wang Qiang (quarterfinals)
8. (Japan) Junri Namigata (first round)

== Main draw ==
=== Key ===
- Q = Qualifier
- WC = Wild card
- LL = Lucky loser
- Alt = Alternate
- SE = Special exempt
- PR = Protected ranking
- ITF = ITF entry
- JE = Junior exempt
- w/o = Walkover
- r = Retired
- d = Defaulted
- SR = Special ranking

=== Finals ===
Semifinals
1	(Kazakhstan) Zarina Diyas	6	3
4	(Russia) Ksenia Pervak	1	1^{r}
5	(China) Duan Yingying	1	1^{r}
6	(Thailand) Noppawan Lertcheewakarn	6	4

Final
1	(Kazakhstan) Zarina Diyas	6	6
6	(Thailand) Noppawan Lertcheewakarn	1	1

=== Top half ===
First round
1	(Kazakhstan) Z Diyas	6	6
(China) Y Wang	3	3
(Serbia) B Bonić	5	1
WC	(China) S Xu	7	6
(Thailand) P Plipuech	2	2
(Chinese Taipei) C-w Chan	6	6
WC	(China) H Tang	2	2
7	(China) Q Wang	6	6
4	(Russia) K Pervak	6	6
Q	(China) C Liu	1	1
(Uzbekistan) S Sharipova	6	7
(Belgium) Y Bonaventure	2	5
(China) F Liu	3	3
(China) Z Yang	6	6
Q	(China) Y Xu	6	6
8	(Japan) J Namigata	1	1

Second round
1	(Kazakhstan) Z Diyas	6	6
WC	(China) S Xu	1	2
(Chinese Taipei) C-w Chan	2	3
7	(China) Q Wang	6	6
4	(Russia) K Pervak	6	6
(Uzbekistan) S Sharipova	3	2
(China) Z Yang	0	2
Q	(China) Y Xu	6	6

Quarterfinals
1	(Kazakhstan) Z Diyas	6	1	6
7	(China) Q Wang	4	6	1
4	(Russia) K Pervak	6	6
Q	(China) Y Xu	2	3

Semifinals
1	(Kazakhstan) Z Diyas	6	3
4	(Russia) K Pervak	1	1^{r}

=== Bottom half ===
First round
5	(China) Y Duan	6	6
(Hong Kong) L Zhang	2	0
(Bosnia and Herzegovina) J Tinjić	6^{5}	6	6
WC	(China) R Tian	7^{7}	3	4
WC	(China) Z Sun	6	6
(Kazakhstan) K Kerimbayeva	4	3
(Thailand) N Lertpitaksinchai	3	6	0
3	(Japan) E Hozumi	6	3	6
6	(Thailand) N Lertcheewakarn	6	6
(Japan) R Fujiwara	3	1
(Japan) M Tanaka	7	3	1
LL	(Russia) P Leykina	5	6	6
Q	(Thailand) V Wongteanchai	2	6	3
(Slovenia) D Jakupović	6	3	6
Q	(Japan) M Ozeki	6	6
2	(China) S Zheng	2	4

Second round
5	(China) Y Duan	6	6
(Bosnia and Herzegovina) J Tinjić	3	4
WC	(China) Z Sun	4	6	2
3	(Japan) E Hozumi	6	3	6
6	(Thailand) N Lertcheewakarn	6	7
LL	(Russia) P Leykina	2	5
(Slovenia) D Jakupović	3	7^{7}	6
Q	(Japan) M Ozeki	6	6^{1}	1

Quarterfinals
5	(China) Y Duan	7^{7}	7
3	(Japan) E Hozumi	6^{1}	5
6	(Thailand) N Lertcheewakarn	6	6
(Slovenia) D Jakupović	4	3

Semifinals
5	(China) Y Duan	1	1^{r}
6	(Thailand) N Lertcheewakarn	6	4
