= 2012 Blossom Cup =

- Date: 3–8 January
- Edition: 3rd
- Location: Quanzhou, China

Champions

Singles
- (Japan) Kimiko Date-Krumm

Doubles
- (Chinese Taipei) Chan Hao-ching / (Japan) Rika Fujiwara
- Blossom Cup

The 2012 Blossom Cup was a professional tennis tournament played on hard courts. It was the third edition of the tournament which was part of the 2012 ITF Women's Circuit. It took place in Quanzhou, China between 3 and 8 January 2012. It offered the prize of US$50,000.

== WTA entrants ==
=== Seeds ===
Country	Player	Rank^{1}	Seed
JPN	Kimiko Date-Krumm	87	1
CHN	Zhang Shuai	126	2
USA	Tetiana Luzhanska	135	3
FRA	Caroline Garcia	142	4
GER	Kathrin Wörle	152	5
HUN	Tímea Babos	154	6
RUS	Ekaterina Ivanova	156	7
JPN	Yurika Sema	169	8

- ^{1} Rankings are as of December 26, 2011.

=== Other entrants ===
The following players received wildcards into the singles main draw:

- (China) Han Xinyun
- (China) Xu Yifan
- (China) Zhao Yijing
- (China) Zhou Yimiao

The following players received entry from the qualifying draw:

- (China) Duan Yingying
- (Montenegro) Danka Kovinić
- (China) Sun Shengnan
- (China) Zhang Kailin

== Champions ==
=== Singles ===
(Japan) Kimiko Date-Krumm def. (Hungary) Tímea Babos, 6–3, 6–3.

=== Doubles ===
(Chinese Taipei) Chan Hao-ching / (Japan) Rika Fujiwara def. (Japan) Kimiko Date-Krumm / (China) Zhang Shuai, 4–6, 6–4, [10–7]
