= Hu Yueyue =

Chinese tennis player

- Full name: Hu Yueyue
- Country (sports): China
- Born: 13 March 1990 (age 36)
- Plays: Right (two-handed backhand)
- Prize money: $55,077

Singles
- Career record: 100–88
- Career titles: 0
- Highest ranking: No. 249 (6 August 2012)

Doubles
- Career record: 24–34
- Career titles: 1 ITF
- Highest ranking: No. 429 (31 December 2012)

Hu Yueyue (Chinese: 胡悦悦; pinyin: Hú Yuèyuè, born 13 March 1990) is a Chinese former tennis player.

Hu has a career-high WTA singles ranking of 249, achieved on 6 August 2012, and a career-high WTA doubles ranking of 429, reached on 31 December 2012. She won one doubles title on the ITF Women's Circuit.

Hu made her WTA Tour main-draw debut at the 2011 China Open, where she played South African Chanelle Scheepers, and lost 0–6, 7–5, 0–6.

At the 2012 Guangzhou International Women's Open, Hu qualified for the main draw, defeating Liu Chang, Erika Sema and Zhao Yijing en route. She drew the third seed, Sorana Cîrstea, and lost 2–6, 5–7.

== ITF Circuit finals ==
Legend
$25,000 tournaments
$10,000 tournaments

=== Singles: 1 (runner-up) ===
Result	Date	Tournament	Surface	Opponent	Score
Loss	9 May 2010	ITF Tarakan, Indonesia	Hard (i)	(Hong Kong) Zhang Ling	3–6, 4–6

=== Doubles: 2 (1 title, 1 runner-up) ===
Result	Date	Tournament	Surface	Partner	Opponent	Score
Loss	6 July 2009	ITF Shenzhen, China	Hard	(China) Yuan Yue	(China) Lu Jiajing (China) Ou Xuanshuo	1–6, 1–6
Win	21 May 2012	ITF Gimcheon, South Korea	Hard	(China) Xu Yifan	(China) Liang Chen (China) Sun Shengnan	6–0, 3–6, [10–7]
