= Makoto Ninomiya =

Japanese tennis player (born 1994)

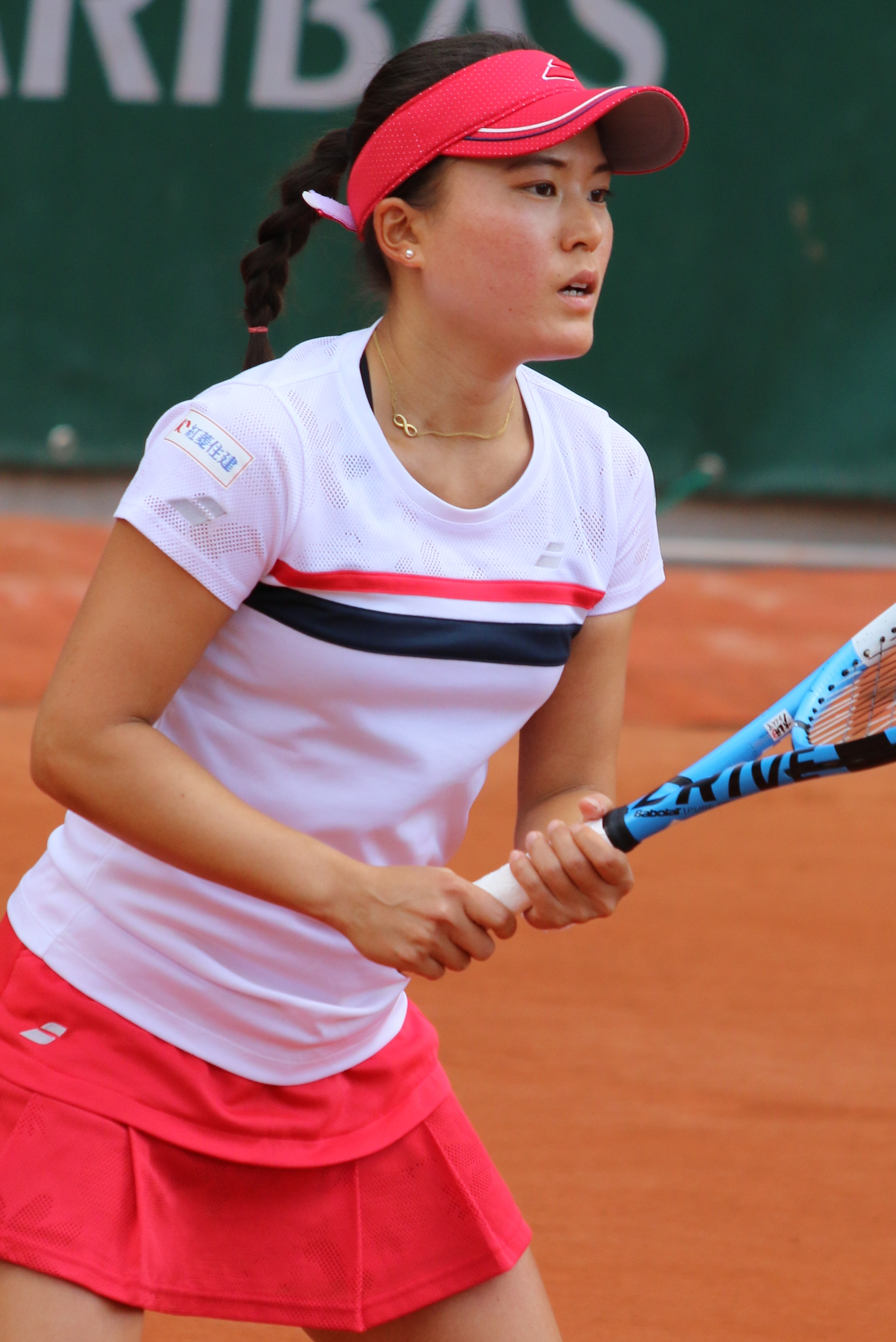
- Ninomiya at the 2019 French Open
- Country (sports): Japan
- Born: 28 May 1994 (age 32) Hiroshima, Japan
- Height: 1.57 m (5 ft 2 in)
- Plays: Right (two-handed backhand)
- Prize money: $1,673,201

Singles
- Career record: 167–149
- Career titles: 0 WTA, 1 ITF
- Highest ranking: No. 280 (22 February 2016)

Doubles
- Career record: 415–334
- Career titles: 9 WTA, 2 WTA 125
- Highest ranking: No. 20 (22 October 2018)
- Current ranking: No. 69 (19 October 2026)

Grand Slam doubles results
- Australian Open: 2R (2020, 2022, 2023, 2024, 2025, 2026)
- French Open: F (2018)
- Wimbledon: SF (2017)
- US Open: 2R (2024)

Grand Slam mixed doubles results
- Australian Open: QF (2022)
- French Open: 1R (2018, 2019)
- Wimbledon: 2R (2017, 2019)
- US Open: 1R (2018)
Medal record
Representing Japan
Women's Tennis
Asian Games
Bronze medal – third place	2018 Jakarta	Doubles
- Last updated on: 23 October 2026.

Makoto Ninomiya (二宮 真琴, Ninomiya Makoto; born 28 May 1994) is a Japanese professional tennis player. She achieved a career-high doubles ranking of world No. 20 on 22 October 2018, and peaked at No. 280 in singles on 22 February 2016. Partnered with Eri Hozumi, she reached the final of the 2018 French Open.

In doubles, she has won nine titles on the WTA Tour, two titles on the WTA Challenger Tour as well as 21 ITF Circuit titles. In singles, there is only one ITF title.

Playing for Japan Fed Cup team, she has a win–loss record of 5–1 (as of October 2026).

== Career ==
Ninomiya began playing tennis on ITF events in 2009.

She reached her biggest final at the 2018 French Open with partner Eri Hozumi, losing to sixth seeds Barbora Krejčíková and Kateřina Siniaková. The pair also reached the final of the 2023 Jiangxi Open where they lost to second seeds Laura Siegemund and Vera Zvonareva.

Alongside Nao Hibino, she was runner-up in the doubles at the 2024 Hong Kong 125 Open, losing to Monica Niculescu and Elena-Gabriela Ruse in the final.

Partnering Ulrikke Eikeri, she won the doubles title at the 2024 Hong Kong Open, defeating Shuko Aoyama and Eri Hozumi in the final which went to a deciding champions tiebreak.

Alongside Maia Lumsden, Ninomiya won the doubles title at the 2025 WTA 125 Saint-Malo Open, defeating Oksana Kalashnikova and Angelica Moratelli in the final.

== Doubles performance timeline ==
Key
W	F	SF	QF	#R	RR	Q#	DNQ	A	NH

(W) winner; (F) finalist; (SF) semifinalist; (QF) quarterfinalist; (#R) rounds 4, 3, 2, 1; (RR) round-robin stage; (Q#) qualification round; (DNQ) did not qualify; (A) absent; (NH) not held; (SR) strike rate (events won / competed); (W–L) win–loss record.
To avoid confusion and double counting, these charts are updated at the conclusion of a tournament or when the player's participation has ended.

Only main-draw results in WTA Tour, Grand Slam tournaments, Fed Cup/Billie Jean King Cup and Olympic Games are included in win–loss records and career statistics.

Tournament	2016	2017	2018	2019	2020	2021	2022	2023	2024	2025	2026	W–L
Grand Slam tournaments
Australian Open	1R	1R	1R	1R	2R	1R	2R	2R	2R	2R	2R	6–11
French Open	A	A	F	1R	1R	2R	1R	1R	2R	2R	3R	10–9
Wimbledon	2R	SF	1R	2R	NH	2R	A	1R	1R	1R	1R	7–9
US Open	1R	1R	1R	1R	1R	1R	1R	1R	2R	1R	1R	1–11
Win–Loss	1–3	4–3	5–4	1–4	1–3	2–4	1–3	1–4	3–4	2–4	3–4	24–40
Year-end championships
WTA Elite Trophy			RR		NH			DNQ	NH			0–2
WTA 1000
Dubai / Qatar Open (Note: The first Premier 5 event of the year has switched back and forth between the Dubai Tennis Championships and the Qatar Ladies Open since 2009. Dubai was classified as a Premier 5 event from 2009 to 2011 before being succeeded by Doha for the 2012–2014 period. In 2015, Dubai regained its Premier 5 status while Doha was demoted to Premier status. The Premier 5 tournaments were reclassified as WTA 1000 tournaments in 2021.)	A	A	QF	2R	2R	1R	1R	2R	2R	A	A	6–7
Indian Wells Open	A	A	A	1R	NH	QF	2R	1R	2R	1R	A	4–6
Miami Open	A	A	A	1R	NH	A	2R	A	1R	A	A	1–3
Madrid Open	A	A	A	1R	NH	1R	1R	QF	1R	A	1R	2–6
Italian Open	A	A	A	1R	2R	1R	2R	2R	1R	1R	A	3–7
Canadian Open	A	A	2R	2R	NH	1R	1R	1R	2R	A	A	3–6
Cincinnati Open	A	A	A	A	1R	1R	1R	A	1R	A	A	0–4
Wuhan Open	A	2R	1R	SF	NH				1R	A	A	4–4
China Open	1R	1R	1R	1R	NH				1R	A	A	0–5
Career statistics
Titles	1	0	1	0	0	1	3	0	0	0	Total: 6	
Year-end ranking (Note: 2013 WTA ranking– 226, 2014 WTA ranking– 187, 2015 WTA ranking– 100.)	62	46	20	64	66	47	39	49	53	60		$1,015,939

== Grand Slam tournament finals ==
=== Doubles: 1 (runner-up) ===
Result	Year	Tournament	Surface	Partner	Opponents	Score
Loss	2018	French Open	Clay	(Japan) Eri Hozumi	(Czech Republic) Barbora Krejčíková (Czech Republic) Kateřina Siniaková	3–6, 3–6

== WTA Tour finals ==
=== Doubles: 19 (9 titles, 10 runner-ups) ===
Legend Grand Slam (0–1) WTA 500 (1–0) WTA 250 (8–9)	Finals by surface Hard (5–7) Grass (2–0) Clay (2–3)

Result	W–L	Date	Tournament	Tier	Surface	Partner	Opponents	Score
Loss	0–1	Aug 2016	Jiangxi International, China	International (Note: The WTA International tournaments were reclassified as WTA 250 tournaments in 2021.)	Hard	(Japan) Shuko Aoyama	(China) Liang Chen (China) Lu Jingjing	6–3, 6–7^{(2)}, [11–13]
Win	1–1	Sep 2016	Japan Women's Open, Japan	International	Hard	(Japan) Shuko Aoyama	(United Kingdom) Jocelyn Rae (United Kingdom) Anna Smith	6–3, 6–3
Loss	1–2	Mar 2017	Malaysian Open, Malaysia	International	Hard	(United States) Nicole Melichar	(Australia) Ashleigh Barty (Australia) Casey Dellacqua	6–7^{(5)}, 3–6
Loss	1–3	Jan 2018	Hobart International, Australia	International	Hard	(Ukraine) Lyudmyla Kichenok	(Belgium) Elise Mertens (Netherlands) Demi Schuurs	2–6, 2–6
Loss	1–4	Jun 2018	French Open, France	Grand Slam	Clay	(Japan) Eri Hozumi	(Czech Republic) Barbora Krejčíková (Czech Republic) Kateřina Siniaková	3–6, 3–6
Loss	1–5	Sep 2018	Japan Women's Open, Japan	International	Hard	(Japan) Miyu Kato	(Japan) Eri Hozumi (China) Zhang Shuai	2–6, 4–6
Win	2–5	Sep 2018	Pan Pacific Open, Japan	Premier (Note: The WTA Premier tournaments were reclassified as WTA 500 tournaments in 2021.)	Hard (i)	(Japan) Miyu Kato	(Czech Republic) Andrea Sestini Hlaváčková (Czech Republic) Barbora Strýcová	6–4, 6–4
Loss	2–6	Apr 2021	İstanbul Cup, Turkey	WTA 250	Clay	(Japan) Nao Hibino	(Russia) Veronika Kudermetova (Belgium) Elise Mertens	1–6, 1–6
Loss	2–7	May 2021	Internationaux de Strasbourg, France	WTA 250	Clay	(China) Yang Zhaoxuan	(Chile) Alexa Guarachi (United States) Desirae Krawczyk	2–6, 3–6
Win	3–7	Jun 2021	Nottingham Open, UK	WTA 250	Grass	(Ukraine) Lyudmyla Kichenok	(United States) Caroline Dolehide (Australia) Storm Sanders	6–4, 6–7^{(3)}, [10–8]
Loss	3–8	Aug 2021	Chicago Open, US	WTA 250	Hard	(Ukraine) Lyudmyla Kichenok	(Ukraine) Nadiia Kichenok (Romania) Raluca Olaru	6–7^{(6)}, 7–5, [8–10]
Win	4–8	Jan 2022	Adelaide International, Australia	WTA 250	Hard	(Japan) Eri Hozumi	(Czech Republic) Tereza Martincová (Czech Republic) Markéta Vondroušová	1–6, 7–6^{(4)}, [10–7]
Win	5–8	May 2022	Rabat Grand Prix, Morocco	WTA 250	Clay	(Japan) Eri Hozumi	(Romania) Monica Niculescu (Russia) Alexandra Panova	6–7^{(7)}, 6–3, [10–8]
Win	6–8	Jun 2022	Bad Homburg Open, Germany	WTA 250	Grass	(Japan) Eri Hozumi	(Poland) Alicja Rosolska (New Zealand) Erin Routliffe	6–4, 6–7^{(5)}, [10–5]
Loss	6–9	Sep 2023	Guangzhou Open, China	WTA 250	Hard	(Japan) Eri Hozumi	(China) Guo Hanyu (China) Jiang Xinyu	3–6, 6–7^{(4)}
Loss	6–10	Oct 2023	Jiangxi Open, China	WTA 250	Hard	(Japan) Eri Hozumi	(Germany) Laura Siegemund; Vera Zvonareva	4–6, 2–6
Win	7–10	Oct 2024	Hong Kong Open, China SAR	WTA 250	Hard	(Norway) Ulrikke Eikeri	(Japan) Shuko Aoyama (Japan) Eri Hozumi	6–4, 4–6, [11–9]
Win	8–10	Jul 2025	Hamburg Open, Germany	WTA 250	Clay	(Ukraine) Nadiia Kichenok	(Hungary) Anna Bondár (Netherlands) Arantxa Rus	6–4, 3–6, [11–9]
Win	9–10	Jul 2025	Prague Open, Czech Republic	WTA 250	Hard	(Ukraine) Nadiia Kichenok	(Czech Republic) Laura Samson (Czech Republic) Lucie Havlíčková	1–6, 6–4, [10–7]

== WTA 125 finals ==
=== Doubles: 6 (2 titles, 4 runner-ups) ===
Result	W–L	Date	Tournament	Surface	Partner	Opponents	Score
Win	1–0	May 2022	Open de Saint-Malo, France	Clay	(Japan) Eri Hozumi	(France) Estelle Cascino (France) Jessika Ponchet	7–6^{(1)}, 6–1
Loss	1–1	Oct 2024	Hong Kong 125 Open, China SAR	Clay	(Japan) Nao Hibino	(Romania) Monica Niculescu (Romania) Elena-Gabriela Ruse	3–6, 7–5, [5–10]
Win	2–1	May 2025	Open de Saint-Malo, France (2)	Clay	(United Kingdom) Maia Lumsden	(Georgia (country)) Oksana Kalashnikova (Italy) Angelica Moratelli	7–5, 6–2
Loss	2–2	Oct 2025	Suzhou Ladies Open, China	Hard	(Poland) Katarzyna Kawa	(Indonesia) Aldila Sutjiadi (Indonesia) Janice Tjen	4–6, 3–6
Loss	2–3	Feb 2026	Oeiras Indoors, Portugal	Hard (i)	(United Kingdom) Emily Appleton	(United States) Carmen Corley (United States) Ivana Corley	6–2, 0–6, [4–10]
Loss	2–4	May 2026	İstanbul Open, Turkiye	Clay	(Czech Republic) Anastasia Dețiuc	Maria Kozyreva (Brazil) Laura Pigossi	4–6, 6–4, [7–10]

== ITF Circuit finals ==
=== Singles: 3 (1 title, 2 runner-ups) ===
Legend $25,000 tournaments (0–1) $10,000 tournaments (1–1)	Finals by surface Hard (0–1) Grass (1–1)

Result	W–L	Date	Tournament	Tier	Surface	Opponent	Score
Win	1–0	Mar 2012	ITF Miyazaki, Japan	10,000	Grass	(Japan) Yumi Miyazaki	6–0, 6–7^{(5)}, 6–0
Loss	1–1	May 2015	ITF Karuizawa, Japan	25,000	Grass	(Japan) Miyu Kato	6–7^{(5)}, 7–5, 1–6
Loss	1–2	Aug 2015	ITF Gimcheon, South Korea	10,000	Hard	(South Korea) Lee So-ra	2–6, 3–6

=== Doubles: 33 (21 titles, 12 runner-ups) ===
Legend $100k tournaments (2–0) $75k tournaments (2–1) $50/60k tournaments (6–2) $25k tournaments (6–5) $10k tournaments (5–4)	Finals by surface Hard (15–7) Clay (0–1) Grass (4–2) Carpet (2–2)

Result	W–L	Date	Tournament	Tier	Surface	Partner	Opponents	Score
Win	1–0	Nov 2011	Toyota World Challenge, Japan	75k	Carpet (i)	(Japan) Riko Sawayanagi	(France) Caroline Garcia (Netherlands) Michaëlla Krajicek	w/o
Loss	1–1	Mar 2013	ITF Nishitama, Japan	10k	Hard	(Japan) Eri Hozumi	(South Korea) Han Na-lae (South Korea) Kang Seo-kyung	4–6, 7–6^{(4)}, [6–10]
Win	2–1	Jun 2013	ITF Bukhara, Uzbekistan	25k	Hard	(Japan) Eri Hozumi	(Russia) Angelina Gabueva (Ukraine) Veronika Kapshay	3–6, 7–5, [10–8]
Win	3–1	Jun 2013	ITF Tokyo, Japan	10k	Hard	(Japan) Yuka Mori	(Japan) Kumiko Iijima (Japan) Akiko Yonemura	6–4, 6–3
Win	4–1	Sep 2013	ITF Noto, Japan	25k	Grass	(Japan) Eri Hozumi	(Japan) Kazusa Ito (Japan) Yuka Mori	6–4, 6–4
Win	5–1	Oct 2013	ITF Makinohara, Japan	25k	Grass	(Japan) Eri Hozumi	(Thailand) Nicha Lertpitaksinchai (Thailand) Peangtarn Plipuech	6–1, 6–2
Loss	5–2	Nov 2013	Toyota World Challenge, Japan	75k	Carpet (i)	(Japan) Eri Hozumi	(Japan) Shuko Aoyama (Japan) Misaki Doi	6–7^{(1)}, 6–2, [9–11]
Win	6–2	Jun 2014	ITF Tokyo, Japan	10k	Hard	(Japan) Mana Ayukawa	(Japan) Yurina Koshino (Japan) Akiko Omae	3–6, 6–4, [10–4]
Loss	6–3	Jun 2014	ITF Kashiwa, Japan	10k	Hard	(Japan) Yuuki Tanaka	(United States) Yuki Chiang (Japan) Aki Yamasoto	7–5, 1–6, [5–10]
Loss	6–4	Jun 2014	ITF Gimcheon, Korea	10k	Hard	(South Korea) Choi Ji-hee	(South Korea) Kim So-jung (South Korea) Lee Ye-ra	5–7, 6–2, [9–11]
Win	7–4	Jun 2014	ITF Gimcheon, Korea	10k	Hard	(South Korea) Choi Ji-hee	(South Korea) Han Na-lae (South Korea) Yoo Mi	6–3, 7–6^{(6)}
Loss	7–5	Jul 2014	ITF Wuhan, China	50k	Hard	(Japan) Miyu Kato	(China) Han Xinyun (China) Zhang Kailin	4–6, 2–6
Win	8–5	Sep 2014	ITF Kyoto, Japan	10k	Hard (i)	(Japan) Kyōka Okamura	(Japan) Ayaka Okuno (Japan) Michika Ozeki	6–3, 6–3
Loss	8–6	Oct 2014	ITF Makinohara, Japan	25k	Grass	(Japan) Mari Tanaka	(Germany) Tatjana Maria (Japan) Miki Miyamura	3–6, 1–6
Loss	8–7	Oct 2014	ITF Hamamatsu, Japan	25k	Carpet	(Japan) Mari Tanaka	(Germany) Tatjana Maria (Japan) Miki Miyamura	7–5, 2–6, [5–10]
Win	9–7	Nov 2014	Toyota World Challenge, Japan	75k	Carpet (i)	(Japan) Eri Hozumi	(Japan) Shuko Aoyama (Japan) Junri Namigata	6–3, 7–5
Win	10–7	Jan 2015	ITF Hong Kong, China SAR	10k	Hard	(Japan) Mana Ayukawa	(China) Tang Haochen (China) Ye Qiuyu	7–6, 2–6, [10–7]
Win	11–7	Mar 2015	Blossom Cup, China	50k	Hard	(Japan) Eri Hozumi	(Japan) Hiroko Kuwata (Japan) Junri Namigata	6–3, 6–7^{(2)}, [10–2]
Win	12–7	May 2015	Kurume Cup, Japan	50k	Grass	(Japan) Riko Sawayanagi	(Japan) Eri Hozumi (Japan) Junri Namigata	7–6^{(10)}, 6–3
Loss	12–8	May 2015	ITF Karuizawa, Japan	25k	Grass	(Japan) Mana Ayukawa	(Japan) Rika Fujiwara (Japan) Miyu Kato	2–6, 0–6
Loss	12–9	May 2015	ITF Changwon, South Korea	25k	Hard (i)	(Japan) Mana Ayukawa	(South Korea) Han Na-lae (South Korea) Yoo Mi	3–6, 1–6
Loss	12–10	Jun 2015	ITF Kashiwa, Japan	25k	Hard	(Japan) Mana Ayukawa	(Japan) Miyu Kato (Japan) Akiko Omae	2–6, 7–5, [8–10]
Loss	12–11	Aug 2015	ITF Gimcheon, South Korea	10k	Hard	(South Korea) Han Sung-hee	(China) Cao Siqi (China) Xun Fangying	6–7^{(2)}, 4–6
Win	13–11	Aug 2015	ITF Tsukuba, Japan	25k	Hard	(Chinese Taipei) Lee Ya-hsuan	(Thailand) Nicha Lertpitaksinchai (Thailand) Peangtarn Plipuech	7–6^{(4)}, 6–7^{(2)}, [6–10]
Win	14–11	Oct 2015	ITF Hamamatsu, Japan	25k	Grass	(Japan) Mana Ayukawa	(Japan) Kanae Hisami (Japan) Kotomi Takahata	0–6, 6–3, [10–4]
Win	15–11	Nov 2015	Tokyo Open, Japan	100k	Hard	(Japan) Shuko Aoyama	(Japan) Eri Hozumi (Japan) Kurumi Nara	3–6, 6–2, [10–7]
Win	16–11	Mar 2016	Blossom Cup, China	50k	Hard	(Japan) Shuko Aoyama	(China) Lu Jingjing (China) Zhang Yuxuan	6–3, 6–0
Win	17–11	Apr 2016	Pingshan Open, China	50k	Hard	(Japan) Shuko Aoyama	(China) Liang Chen (China) Wang Yafan	7–6^{(5)}, 6–4
Win	18–11	May 2016	ITF Incheon, South Korea	25k	Hard	(South Korea) Han Sung-hee	(Thailand) Kamonwan Buayam (Chinese Taipei) Lee Pei-chi	6–3, 6–1
Win	19–11	Jul 2016	ITF Wuhan, China	50k	Hard	(Japan) Shuko Aoyama	(Chinese Taipei) Chang Kai-chen (China) Duan Yingying	6–4, 6–4
Win	20–11	Oct 2017	Liuzhou Open China	60k	Hard	(China) Han Xinyun	(United States) Jacqueline Cako (United Kingdom) Laura Robson	6–2, 7–6^{(3)}
Loss	20–12	Mar 2018	Clay Court International, Australia	60k	Clay	(Japan) Miyu Kato	(Australia) Priscilla Hon (Slovenia) Dalila Jakupović	4–6, 6–4, [7–10]
Win	21–12	Nov 2019	Shenzhen Longhua Open, China	W100	Hard	(Japan) Nao Hibino	(Georgia (country)) Sofia Shapatava (United Kingdom) Emily Webley-Smith	6–4, 6–0
