= Zhou Yimiao =

Chinese tennis player

- Country (sports): China
- Residence: Shanghai, China
- Born: February 7, 1991 (age 35) Hubei, China
- Plays: Right (two-handed backhand)
- Prize money: $171,874

Singles
- Career record: 144–79
- Career titles: 6 ITF
- Highest ranking: No. 127 (19 August 2013)

Doubles
- Career record: 83–56
- Career titles: 8 ITF
- Highest ranking: No. 134 (16 September 2013)

Grand Slam doubles results
- Australian Open: 2R (2013)

Zhou Yimiao, also spelled as Zhou Yi-Miao, (Chinese: 周奕妙; pinyin: Zhōu Yìmiào; Mandarin pronunciation: [ʈʂóʊ î mjâʊ]; born 7 February 1991) is a former professional Chinese tennis player.

Zhou was born in Hubei. Her highest WTA singles ranking is 127, which she reached on 19 August 2013. Her career-high in doubles is 134, which she reached on 16 September 2013.

In her career, she won six singles and eight doubles titles on the ITF Circuit.

== ITF finals ==
=== Singles (6–3) ===
Legend $75,000 tournaments $50,000 tournaments $25,000 tournaments $15,000 tournaments $10,000 tournaments	Finals by surface Hard (6–3)

Outcome	No.	Date	Tournament	Surface	Opponent	Score
Winner	1.	14 October 2007	Beijing, China	Hard	(Japan) Kumiko Iijima	6–1, 6–2
Winner	2.	16 March 2008	Kalgoorlie, Australia	Hard	(New Zealand) Ellen Barry	7–5, 6–2
Winner	3.	16 February 2009	Guangzhou, China	Hard	(China) Liang Chen	6–3, 4–6, 6–0
Winner	4.	8 March 2009	Sydney, Australia	Hard	(Japan) Yurika Sema	6–3, 6–4
Runner-up	5.	17 August 2009	Pingguo, China	Hard	(China) Sun Shengnan	4–6, 4–6
Runner-up	6.	10 January 2010	Industrial Bank Cup, China	Hard	(Serbia) Aleksandra Krunić	3–6, 5–7
Winner	7.	17 January 2010	Pingguo, China	Hard	(Greece) Anna Gerasimou	6–3, 6–0
Winner	8.	6 May 2013	Seoul, South Korea	Hard	(South Korea) Han Na-lae	6–2, 6–1
Runner-up	9.	14 July 2013	Beijing Challenger, China	Hard	(China) Zhang Shuai	2–6, 1–6

=== Doubles (8–7) ===
Legend $100,000 tournaments $75,000 tournaments $50,000 tournaments $25,000 tournaments $10,000 tournaments	Finals by surface Hard (7–5) Clay (1–2)

Outcome	No.	Date	Tournament	Surface	Partner	Opponents	Score
Runner-up	1.	Aug 2006	Vlaardingen, Netherlands	Clay	(China) Guo Xuanyu	(Netherlands) Eva Pera (Netherlands) Daniëlle Harmsen	2–6, 6–7^{(2–7)}
Runner-up	2.	Sep 2006	Enschede, Netherlands	Clay	(China) Guo Xuanyu	(Netherlands) Marlot Meddens (Netherlands) Pauline Wong	6–7^{(6–8)}, 2–6
Runner-up	3.	Jun 2007	Guangzhou, China	Hard	(China) Chen Yanchong	(China) Huang Lei (China) Xu Yifan	2–6, 6–7^{(4–7)}
Winner	4.	Mar 2008	Pingguo, China	Hard	(China) Li Ting	(Japan) Natsumi Hamamura (Japan) Remi Tezuka	6–1, 4–6, [10–8]
Winner	5.	Sep 2008	Rockhampton, Australia	Hard	(Japan) Remi Tezuka	(Sweden) Michaela Johansson (Australia) Jarmila Gajdošová	7–6^{(7–2)}, 6–4
Runner-up	6.	Feb 2009	Burnie International, Australia	Hard	(China) Xu Yifan	(Australia) Monique Adamczak (United States) Abigail Spears	2–6, 4–6
Winner	7.	Jun 2009	Qianshan, China	Hard	(China) Sun Shengnan	(China) Han Xinyun (China) Ying Qian	6–2, 6–4
Winner	8.	Jan 2010	Industrial Bank Cup, China	Hard	(China) Liu Wanting	(Ukraine) Yuliya Beygelzimer (China) Yan Zi	6–1, 6–2
Winner	9.	Mar 2010	Hammond, United States	Hard	(China) Xu Yifan	(United States) Christina Fusano (United States) Courtney Nagle	6–2, 6–2
Winner	10.	Mar 2010	Clearwater, United States	Hard	(China) Xu Yifan	(Russia) Alina Jidkova (Germany) Laura Siegemund	6–4, 6–4
Runner-up	11.	Mar 2012	Sanya, China	Hard	(China) Liang Chen	(Japan) Erika Sema (China) Zheng Saisai	2–6, 2–6
Runner-up	12.	Jul 2012	Yakima, United States	Hard	(China) Xu Yifan	(United States) Samantha Crawford (United States) Madison Keys	3–6, 6–2, 3–6
Winner	13.	May 2013	Grado Tennis Cup, Italy	Clay	(Japan) Yurika Sema	(Switzerland) Viktorija Golubic (Latvia) Diāna Marcinkēviča	1–6, 7–5, [10–7]
Runner-up	14.	Jun 2013	Huzhu, China	Hard	(China) Liu Chang	(China) Sun Shengnan (Chinese Taipei) Chan Chin-wei	4–6, 3–6
Winner	15.	Jul 2013	Beijing Challenger, China	Hard	(China) Liu Chang	(Japan) Misaki Doi (Japan) Miki Miyamura	7–6^{(7–1)}, 6–4
