= Industrial Bank Cup =

- 2018 Industrial Bank Cup

ITF Women's Tour
- Event name: Industrial Bank Cup (current); Blossom Cup (former)
- Location: Quanzhou, China
- Venue: Blossom Garden Tennis Center
- Category: ITF Women's Circuit
- Surface: Hard
- Draw: 32S/32Q/16D
- Prize money: $60,000

The Industrial Bank Cup (Chinese: 兴业银行杯; pinyin: Xìngyè yínháng bēi) is a tournament for professional female tennis players played on outdoor hardcourts. The event is classified as a $60,000 ITF Women's Circuit tournament and has been held annually in Quanzhou, China since 2009.

== Past finals ==
=== Singles ===
Year	Champion	Runner-up	Score
2009	(Australia) Sophie Ferguson	(Chinese Taipei) Chan Yung-jan	6–3, 6–1
2010	(Serbia) Aleksandra Krunić	(China) Zhou Yimiao	6−3, 7−5
2011	(China) Lu Jingjing	(France) Stéphanie Foretz Gacon	3–6, 7–6^{(7–2)}, 6–3
2012	(Japan) Kimiko Date-Krumm	(Hungary) Tímea Babos	6–3, 6–3
2013	(Thailand) Varatchaya Wongteanchai	(Ukraine) Nadiia Kichenok	6–2, 6–7^{(5–7)}, 7–6^{(7–5)}
2014	(Kazakhstan) Zarina Diyas	(Thailand) Noppawan Lertcheewakarn	6–1, 6–1
2015	(Russia) Elizaveta Kulichkova	(Latvia) Jeļena Ostapenko	6–1, 5–7, 7–5
2016	(China) Wang Qiang	(China) Liu Fangzhou	6–2, 6–2
2017	(China) Zheng Saisai	(China) Liu Fangzhou	6–2, 6–3
2018	(China) Zheng Saisai (2)	(China) Liu Fangzhou	6–3, 6–1

=== Doubles ===
Year	Champions	Runners-up	Score
2009	(China) Han Xinyun (Chinese Taipei) Kao Shao-yuan	(China) Hao Jie (China) Sun Tiantian	1–6, 6–2, [10–6]
2010	(China) Liu Wanting (China) Zhou Yimiao	(Ukraine) Yuliya Beygelzimer (China) Yan Zi	6–1, 6–2
2011	(China) Liu Wanting (2) (China) Sun Shengnan	(Ukraine) Yuliya Beygelzimer (Georgia (country)) Oksana Kalashnikova	6–3, 6–2
2012	(Chinese Taipei) Chan Hao-ching (Japan) Rika Fujiwara	(Japan) Kimiko Date-Krumm (China) Zhang Shuai	4–6, 6–4, [10–7]
2013	(Ukraine) Irina Buryachok (Ukraine) Nadiia Kichenok	(China) Liang Chen (China) Sun Shengnan	3–6, 6–3, [12–10]
2014	(Chinese Taipei) Chan Chin-wei (China) Xu Yifan	(China) Sun Ziyue (China) Xu Shilin	7–6^{(7–4)}, 6–1
2015	(Japan) Eri Hozumi (Japan) Makoto Ninomiya	(Japan) Hiroko Kuwata (Japan) Junri Namigata	6–3, 6–7^{(2–7)}, [10–2]
2016	(Japan) Shuko Aoyama (Japan) Makoto Ninomiya (2)	(China) Lu Jingjing (China) Zhang Yuxuan	6–3, 6–0
2017	(China) Han Xinyun (2) (China) Ye Qiuyu	(Japan) Hiroko Kuwata (China) Zhu Lin	6–3, 6–3
2018	(China) Han Xinyun (3) (China) Ye Qiuyu (2)	(China) Guo Hanyu (China) Wang Xinyu	7–6^{(7–3)}, 7–6^{(8–6)}
