= Zhang Yuxuan =

Chinese tennis player

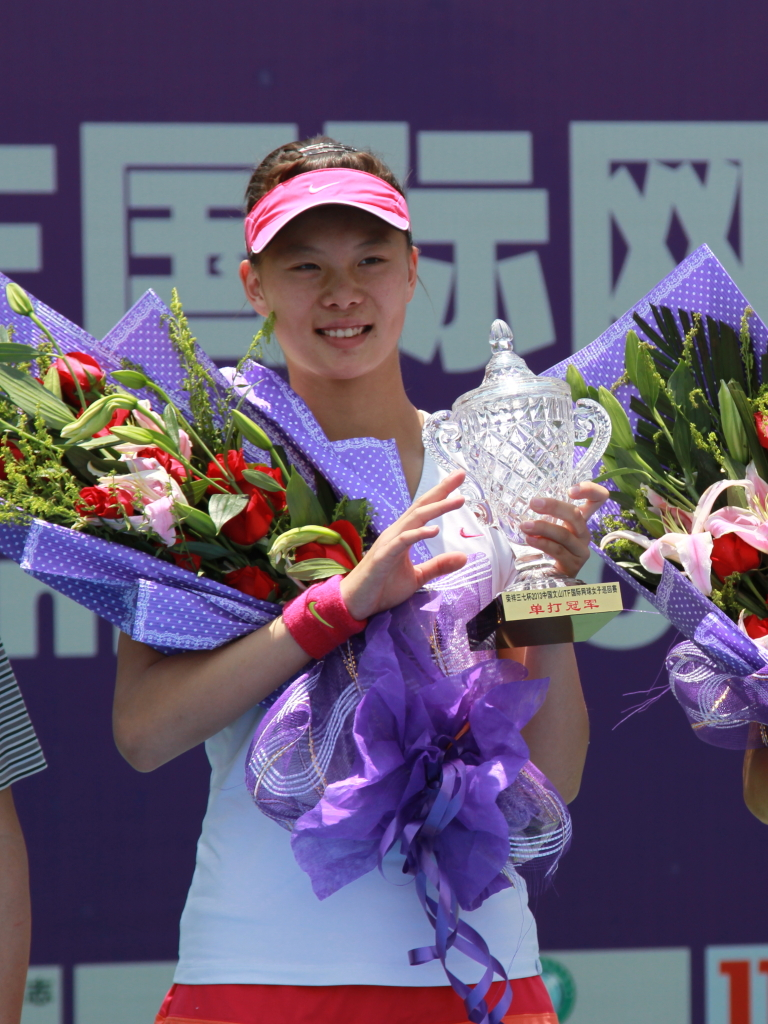
- Zhang Yuxuan after winning in Wenshan
- Country (sports): China
- Residence: Tianjin, China
- Born: 19 August 1994 (age 32) Tianjin
- Height: 1.79 m (5 ft 10 in)
- Plays: Right-handed (two-handed backhand)
- Prize money: $245,141

Singles
- Career record: 196–175
- Career titles: 5 ITF
- Highest ranking: No. 166 (18 April 2016)

Grand Slam singles results
- Australian Open: 1R (2013)
- Wimbledon: Q1 (2019)
- US Open: Q1 (2018)

Doubles
- Career record: 33–34
- Career titles: 1 ITF
- Highest ranking: No. 299 (2 November 2015)

Zhang Yuxuan (Chinese: 张宇璇; pinyin: Zhāngyǔxuān; Mandarin pronunciation: [ʈʂáŋ ỳ ɕɥɛ́n]; born 19 August 1994) is a former professional tennis player from China.

In her career, she won five singles titles and one doubles title on the ITF Circuit. On 18 April 2016, she reached her highest WTA singles ranking of 166. On 2 November 2015, she peaked at No. 299 in the doubles rankings.

== Biography ==
Zhang began playing tennis at the age of four. She gained a wildcard to the 2013 Australian Open, winning the Asia Pacific Wildcard Playoff.

She competed at her latest ITF event in February 2020.

== ITF Circuit finals ==
=== Singles: 8 (5 titles, 3 runner-ups) ===
Legend $50,000 tournaments $25,000 tournaments $10,000 tournaments	Finals by surface Hard (5–3)

Result	W–L	Date	Tournament	Tier	Surface	Opponent	Score
Win	1–0	Sep 2012	ITF Yeongwol, South Korea	10,000	Hard	(China) Wen Xin	7–6^{(2)}, 3–6, 6–3
Win	2–0	Apr 2013	ITF Wenshan, China	50,000	Hard	(China) Wang Qiang	1–6, 7–6^{(4)}, 6–2
Loss	2–1	Jun 2013	ITF Changwon, South Korea	25,000	Hard	(Japan) Risa Ozaki	4–6, 4–6
Loss	2–2	Aug 2014	ITF Yeongwol, South Korea	10,000	Hard	(South Korea) Choi Ji-hee	3–6, 4–6
Win	3–2	May 2015	ITF Wuhan, China	50,000	Hard	(China) Liu Chang	6–4, 6–0
Loss	3–3	Oct 2015	Zhuhai Open, China	50,000	Hard	(Chinese Taipei) Chang Kai-chen	6–4, 1–6, 6–7^{(0)}
Win	4–3	Jun 2018	ITF Luzhou, China	25,000	Hard	(China) Gai Ao	6–2, 6–0
Win	5–3	Jul 2018	ITF Naiman, China	25,000	Hard	(China) Xun Fangying	6–3, 6–2

=== Doubles: 3 (1 title, 2 runner-ups) ===
Legend $50,000 tournaments $10,000 tournaments	Finals by surface Hard (1–2)

Result	W–L	Date	Tournament	Tier	Surface	Partner	Opponents	Score
Loss	0–1	Sep 2012	ITF Yeongwol, South Korea	10,000	Hard	(China) Zhang Nannan	(South Korea) Kim Ji-young (South Korea) Yoo Mi	5–7, 4–6
Win	1–1	Oct 2015	Suzhou Ladies Open, China	50,000	Hard	(China) Yang Zhaoxuan	(China) Tian Ran (China) Zhang Kailin	7–6^{(4)}, 6–2
Loss	1–2	Mar 2016	Blossom Cup, China	50,000	Hard	(China) Lu Jingjing	(Japan) Shuko Aoyama (Japan) Makoto Ninomiya	3–6, 0–6
