= Sun Shengnan =

Chinese tennis player

Sun Shengnan 孙胜男
- Country (sports): China
- Residence: Beijing
- Born: 21 January 1987 (age 38); Beijing
- Height: 1.70 m (5 ft 7 in)
- Turned pro: 2002
- Plays: Left-handed (two-handed backhand)
- Prize money: $289,473

Singles
- Career record: 205–166
- Career titles: 6 ITF
- Highest ranking: No. 216 (4 April 2011)

Grand Slam singles results
- US Open: Q2 (2007)

Doubles
- Career record: 256–158
- Career titles: 1 WTA, 26 ITF
- Highest ranking: No. 50 (17 September 2007)

Grand Slam doubles results
- Australian Open: QF (2007)
- French Open: 2R (2007)
- Wimbledon: 1R (2007, 2008)
- US Open: 1R (2007)

Sun Shengnan (Chinese: 孙胜男; pinyin: Sūn Shèngnán; Mandarin pronunciation: [swə́n ʂə̂ŋ nǎn]; born 21 January 1987) is a Chinese former tennis player. Her highest WTA singles ranking is 216th, which she reached on 4 April 2011. Her career-high in doubles is 50th, which she reached on 17 September 2007.

By March 2006, Sun had won two ITF singles titles and risen to No. 320 in the WTA rankings, and had earned herself a reputation as 'one to watch', having shown plenty of recent promise of further improvement in the preceding year.

== Career ==
Sun Shengnan began competing on the ITF Women's Circuit at the age of 15, in May 2002. Over the next few months, she won seven matches (mostly in qualifying draws) and lost just five. However, she did not compete again for a whole year after the beginning of August, and thus gained for herself only a lowly end-of-year foothold on the world ranking list at No. 1031.

When August finally came around again in 2003, she returned to competition as a 16-year-old at ITF events; and that October she reached the quarterfinal of a $25k tournament at Beijing after being awarded a wildcard entry into the main draw, before losing to Yuka Yoshida. She finished the year with a 5–5 win–loss record after just a few events played. The record of her year-end ranking seems to have been lost by the WTA, but it was undoubtedly an improvement on her 2002 outcome thanks to the quarterfinal finish at Beijing.

2004 was another moderate year for Sun, as she won six matches and lost seven, her best finish again coming at October's $25k tournament at Beijing, where she repeated her previous year's performance in reaching the quarterfinal, this time losing to high-ranked countrywoman Zheng Jie. She finished the year world-ranked 588, which logically should have been similar to her previous year's finish.

But it was to be in 2005 that the Chinese teenager would first break through to greater results, including two tournament wins. In February, she reached her career-first semifinal in the $10k tournament at Melilla. In April, she won the $10k event at Wuhan. Then in May, she won another $10k title at Ahmedabad. In August, she reached the final of a $25k fixture at Wuxi, losing to Miho Saeki of Japan. Then in September, she qualified for her first WTA Tour event at Guangzhou International Open with an impressive three-set victory over the young Croat prospect Ivana Lisjak, but lost in the first round of the main draw to Alina Jidkova of Russia. At the end of the year, her world ranking had leapt up to 336.

In January 2006, she suffered a few early losses, but picked up enough points in qualifying rounds to improve to a career-best ranking of 311 early in February. Then she defended but did not improve upon her previous year's semifinal performance at Melilla.

With youth still very much on her side, the 19-year-old appeared to be one of China's hottest next-generation prospects for advancement into the world's top 150. But after rising to a career high of No. 233 in May 2007, a dismal run of early losses over the summer and Autumn that year caused her ranking to slip back to No. 400 by the beginning of December the same year before a quarterfinal result at a $75k tournament that month revived it to around 350 at the close of the year.

She then started the year off in 2011, making the semifinals in the $50k event at Quanzhou moving her rankings up to world No. 248.

== WTA Tour finals ==
=== Doubles: 3 (1 title, 2 runner-ups) ===
Legend (pre/post 2009)
Grand Slam tournaments
Tier I / Premier M & Premier 5
Tier II / Premier
Tier III, IV & V / International (1–2)

Finals by surface
Hard (1–1)
Grass (0–0)
Clay (0–1)
Carpet (0–0)

Outcome	No.	Date	Tournament	Surface	Partner	Opponents	Score
Runner-up	1.	13 May 2007	Prague Open, Czech Republic	Clay	(China) Ji Chunmei	(Czech Republic) Petra Cetkovská (Czech Republic) Andrea Hlaváčková	6–7^{(7–9)}, 2–6
Winner	1.	16 September 2007	Bali Tennis Classic, Indonesia	Hard	(China) Ji Chunmei	(United States) Jill Craybas (South Africa) Natalie Grandin	6–3, 6–2
Runner-up	2.	13 February 2011	Pattaya Open, Thailand	Hard	(China) Zheng Jie	(Italy) Sara Errani (Italy) Roberta Vinci	6–3, 3–6, [5–10]

== ITF Circuit finals ==
Legend
$100,000 tournaments
$75,000 tournaments
$50,000 tournaments
$25,000 tournaments
$10,000 tournaments

=== Singles: 8 (6–2) ===
Outcome	No.	Date	Tournament	Surface	Opponent	Score
Winner	1.	Apr 2005	ITF Wuhan, China	Hard	(China) Liang Chen	6–3, 4–6, 6–3
Winner	2.	May 2005	ITF Ahmedabad, India	Hard	(India) Ankita Bhambri	6–2, 6–2
Runner–up	1.	Aug 2005	ITF Wuxi, China	Hard	(Japan) Miho Saeki	2–6, 6–7^{(1)}
Winner	3.	Sep 2006	ITF Guangzhou, China	Hard	(Japan) Yurika Sema	6–2, 6–4
Winner	4.	Jun 2009	ITF Qianshan, China	Hard	(China) Han Xinyun	6–1, 6–4
Winner	5.	Aug 2009	ITF Pingguo, China	Hard	(China) Zhou Yimiao	6–4, 6–4
Winner	6.	Aug 2009	ITF Qianshan, China	Hard	(China) Liang Chen	6–3, 6–3
Runner–up	2.	May 2010	Kangaroo Cup, Japan	Hard	(Czech Republic) Karolína Plíšková	3–6, 6–3, 3–6

=== Doubles: 43 (26–17) ===
Outcome	No.	Date	Tournament	Surface	Partner	Opponents	Score
Runner–up	1.	27 February 2005	ITF Melilla, Spain	Hard	(China) Yang Shujing	(Italy) Sara Errani (Spain) María José Martínez Sánchez	7–6^{(2)}, 0–6, 5–7
Runner–up	2.	29 May 2005	ITF Shanghai, China	Hard	(China) Liu Wanting	(Chinese Taipei) Chuang Chia-jung (Japan) Remi Tezuka	6–4, 4–6, 1–6
Winner	3.	26 February 2006	ITF Melilla, Spain	Hard	(China) Liu Wanting	(Spain) Sara del Barrio Aragón (Spain) Sabrina Méndez Domínguez	6–4, 6–0
Winner	4.	4 June 2006	ITF Tianjin, China	Hard	(China) Ji Chunmei	(Chinese Taipei) Chan Chin-wei (Chinese Taipei) Chen Yi	3–6, 7–6^{(7)}, 6–1
Runner–up	5.	23 July 2006	ITF Chongqing, China	Hard	(China) Ji Chunmei	(China) Ren Jing (China) Zhang Shuai	4–6, 3–6
Runner–up	6.	27 August 2006	ITF Nanjing, China	Hard	(China) Ji Chunmei	(Chinese Taipei) Chuang Chia-jung (China) Xie Yanze	1–6, 6–7^{(11)}
Winner	7.	29 October 2006	Beijing Challenger, China	Hard (i)	(China) Ji Chunmei	(New Zealand) Marina Erakovic (United States) Raquel Kops-Jones	6–2, 6–2
Winner	8.	5 November 2006	ITF Shanghai, China	Hard	(China) Ji Chunmei	(Uzbekistan) Akgul Amanmuradova (Uzbekistan) Iroda Tulyaganova	6–4, 7–5
Winner	9.	14 October 2007	ITF Beijing, China	Hard	(China) Ji Chunmei	(China) Liang Chen (China) Zhao Yijing	6–2, 6–3
Winner	10.	11 November 2007	ITF Taizhou, China	Hard	(China) Ji Chunmei	(China) Huang Lei (China) Zhang Shuai	7–6^{(5)}, 1–6, [13–11]
Runner-up	11.	2 December 2007	ITF Xiamen, China	Hard	(China) Ji Chunmei	(China) Han Xinyun (China) Xu Yifan	4–6, 5–7
Winner	12.	14 March 2008	ITF New Delhi, İndia	Hard	(China) Ji Chunmei	(United States) Sunitha Rao (France) Aurélie Védy	2–6, 6–2, [10–4]
Runner-up	13.	21 November 2008	ITF Kolkata, İndia	Hard	(China) Lu Jingjing	(Germany) Laura Siegemund (Romania) Ágnes Szatmári	5–7, 3–6
Winner	14.	13 February 2009	ITF Mildura, Australia	Grass	(China) Lu Jingjing	(China) Han Xinyun (China) Ji Chunmei	7–6^{(2)}, 7–6^{(4)}
Runner-up	15.	21 February 2009	ITF Guangzhou, China	Hard	(China) Han Xinyun	(China) Ji Chunmei (China) Liang Chen	7–6^{(7)}, 2–6, [3–10]
Winner	16.	8 March 2009	ITF Lyon, France	Hard (i)	(China) Lu Jingjing	(Turkey) Pemra Özgen (China) Zhang Shuai	6–4, 7–5
Winner	17.	14 March 2009	ITF Las Palmas, Spain	Hard	(China) Lu Jingjing	(Russia) Yana Buchina (Slovenia) Taja Mohorcic	6–3, 7–6^{(1)}
Winner	18.	21 March 2009	ITF Tenerife, Spain	Hard	(China) Zhang Shuai	(Spain) Paula Fondevila Castro (France) Laura Thorpe	6–1, 6–2
Winner	19.	27 March 2009	ITF La Palma, Spain	Hard	(China) Lu Jingjing	(Greece) Eleni Daniilidou (Germany) Jasmin Wöhr	6–2, 5–7, [10–5]
Winner	20.	17 May 2009	Kurume Cup, Japan	Grass	(China) Lu Jingjing	(Chinese Taipei) Chang Kai-chen (Japan) Ayaka Maekawa	6–3, 6–2
Winner	21.	24 May 2009	Incheon Open, Korea	Hard	(China) Lu Jingjing	(China) Han Xinyun (China) Ji Chunmei	6–3, 6–3
Runner-up	22.	31 May 2009	ITF Goyang, Korea	Hard	(China) Lu Jingjing	(Indonesia) Yayuk Basuki (Indonesia) Romana Tedjakusuma	6–7^{(5)}, 3–6 [8–10]
Runner-up	23.	7 June 2009	ITF Gimhae, Korea	Hard	(China) Liang Chen	(Indonesia) Yayuk Basuki (Indonesia) Romana Tedjakusuma	5–7, 1–6
Winner	24.	27 June 2009	ITF Qianshan, China	Hard	(China) Zhou Yimiao	(China) Han Xinyun (China) Ying Qian	6–2, 6–4
Winner	25.	3 July 2009	ITF Xiamen, China	Hard	(China) Lu Jingjing	(China) Han Xinyun (Chinese Taipei) Kao Shao-yuan	6–2, 6–4
Runner-up	26.	21 August 2009	ITF Pingguo, China	Hard	(China) Lu Jingjing	(Chinese Taipei) Chan Chin-wei (Chinese Taipei) Hwang I-hsuan	6–3, 5–7, [7–10]
Winner	27.	28 August 2009	ITF Qianshan, China	Hard	(China) Liang Chen	(Australia) Alison Bai (Australia) Sacha Jones	6–2, 6–4
Winner	28.	10 May 2010	Kurume Cup, Japan	Grass	(China) Xu Yifan	(Czech Republic) Karolína Plíšková (Czech Republic) Kristýna Plíšková	6–0, 6–3
Runner-up	29.	17 May 2010	ITF Karuizawa, Japan	Carpet	(China) Xu Yifan	(Japan) Ayumi Oka (Japan) Akiko Yonemura	6–7^{(1)}, 3–6
Winner	30.	2 August 2010	Beijing Challenger, China	Hard	(China) Zhang Shuai	(China) Ji Chunmei (China) Liu Wanting	4–6, 6–2, [10–5]
Runner–up	31.	14 August 2010	ITF Tallinn, Estonia	Hard	(China) Lu Jingjing	(Finland) Emma Laine (United Kingdom) Melanie South	3–6, 4–6
Winner	32.	3 January 2011	Blossom Cup, China	Hard	(China) Liu Wanting	(Ukraine) Yuliya Beygelzimer (Georgia (country)) Oksana Kalashnikova	6–3, 6–2
Runner-up	33.	10 January 2011	ITF Pingguo, China	Hard	(China) Liu Wanting	(Japan) Shuko Aoyama (Japan) Rika Fujiwara	4–6, 3–6
Runner-up	34.	23 May 2011	Grado Tennis Cup, Italy	Clay	(China) Liu Wanting	(Argentina) María Irigoyen (Russia) Ekaterina Lopes	3–6, 0–6
Winner	35.	16 July 2011	Challenger de Granby, Canada	Hard	(Canada) Sharon Fichman	(Belarus) Viktoriya Kisialeva (Brazil) Nathalia Rossi	6–4, 6–2
Runner-up	36.	26 March 2012	ITF Phuket, Thailand	Hard	(China) Han Xinyun	(Thailand) Noppawan Lertcheewakarn (China) Zheng Saisai	3–6, 3–6
Winner	37.	14 May 2012	Kurume Cup, Japan	Grass	(China) Han Xinyun	(Russia) Ksenia Lykina (United Kingdom) Melanie South	6–1, 6–0
Runner-up	38.	28 May 2012	ITF Gimcheon, Korea	Hard	(China) Liang Chen	(China) Hu Yueyue (China) Xu Yifan	0–6, 6–3, [7–10]
Winner	39.	18 June 2012	ITF Goyang, Korea	Hard	(China) Liu Wanting	(Thailand) Nicha Lertpitaksinchai (Thailand) Peangtarn Plipuech	6–7^{(1)}, 6–3, [10–7]
Winner	40.	30 June 2012	Incheon Open, Korea	Hard	(China) Liang Chen	(South Korea) Kim Ji-young (South Korea) Yoo Mi	6–3, 6–2
Winner	41.	5 August 2012	Beijing Challenger, China	Hard	(China) Liu Wanting	(Chinese Taipei) Chan Chin-wei (China) Han Xinyun	5–7, 6–0, [10–7]
Runner-up	42.	3 January 2013	Blossom Cup, China	Hard	(China) Liang Chen	(Ukraine) Irina Buryachok (Ukraine) Nadiia Kichenok	6–3, 3–6, [10–12]
Winner	43.	24 June 2013	ITF Huzhu, China	Clay	(Chinese Taipei) Chan Chin-wei	(China) Liu Chang (China) Zhou Yimiao	6–4, 6–3

== See also ==
- Tennis in China
