= Zhang Ling (tennis) =

Hong Kong tennis player

Zhang Ling 張玲
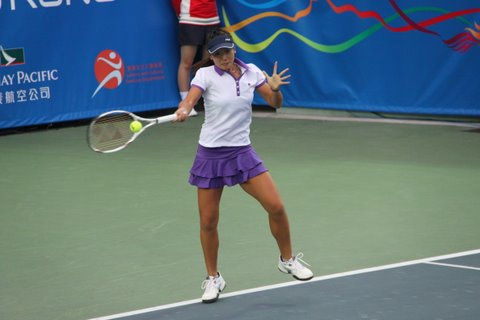
- Country (sports): Hong Kong
- Residence: Hong Kong
- Born: 28 October 1989 (age 36) Hunan, China
- Height: 1.78 m (5 ft 10 in)
- Retired: September 2020
- Plays: Right (two-handed backhand)
- Prize money: $264,514

Singles
- Career record: 380–278
- Career titles: 14 ITF
- Highest ranking: No. 184 (12 September 2011)

Grand Slam singles results
- Australian Open: Q1 (2012, 2015)
- French Open: Q2 (2011)
- US Open: Q3 (2011)

Doubles
- Career record: 150–176
- Career titles: 7 ITF
- Highest ranking: No. 219 (22 June 2009)

Team competitions
- Fed Cup: 37–26

Zhang Ling
- Traditional Chinese: 張玲
- Simplified Chinese: 张玲
Transcriptions
Standard Mandarin
- Hanyu Pinyin: Zhāng Líng
- IPA: [ʈʂáŋ lǐŋ]
Yue: Cantonese
- Jyutping: Zoeng1 Ling4
- IPA: [tsœŋ˥ lɪŋ˩]

Zhang Ling (simplified Chinese: 张玲; traditional Chinese: 張玲; born October 28, 1989), stylized as Lynn Zhang after retirement, is a former Chinese tennis player competing for Hong Kong.

== Career highlights ==
On 12 September 2011, she reached her highest singles ranking by the Women's Tennis Association (WTA) of 184. On 22 June 2009, she also reached her highest WTA doubles ranking of 219. She won 14 singles titles and seven doubles titles on the ITF Women's Circuit.

In 2014, she had her first main-draw match win on the WTA Tour in Kuala Lumpur. She defeated Olga Savchuk, and become the first Hong Kongese player to achieve this, after Patricia Hy-Boulais done it in the 1980s.

Playing for Hong Kong at the Fed Cup, Ling has a win–loss record of 37–26. She is the Hong Kong player with most ties (44) and years (11) played, together with most singles, doubles and total wins, leading Hong Kong to play in Asia Group I for four times (2007, 2008, 2015, 2018).

Zhang announced her retirement from professional tennis in September 2020, after 16 years on the tour.

== ITF Circuit finals ==
Legend
$50,000 tournaments
$25,000 tournaments
$15,000 tournaments
$10,000 tournaments

=== Singles: 26 (14 titles, 12 runner-ups) ===
Result	No.	Date	Tournament	Surface	Opponent	Score
Win	1.	Mar 2007	ITF Wellington, New Zealand	Hard	(New Zealand) Kairangi Vano	6–1, 6–1
Win	2.	Aug 2007	ITF Tokyo, Japan	Hard	(Japan) Mari Tanaka	4–6, 7–5, 6–2
Win	3.	Mar 2009	ITF North Shore City, New Zealand	Hard	(Chinese Taipei) Hwang I-hsuan	6–1, 6–0
Win	4.	Aug 2009	ITF Nonthaburi, Thailand	Hard	(Japan) Sachie Ishizu	6–4, 7–5
Win	5.	Aug 2009	ITF Nonthaburi, Thailand	Hard	(Indonesia) Lavinia Tananta	6–2, 6–2
Win	6.	May 2010	ITF Tarakan, Indonesia	Hard (i)	(China) Hu Yueyue	6–3, 6–4
Loss	1.	May 2010	ITF Tanjung Selor, Indonesia	Hard	(Austria) Melanie Klaffner	6–3, 7–6^{(1)}
Loss	2.	Jul 2010	ITF Valladolid, Spain	Hard	(Turkey) Çağla Büyükakçay	7–6^{(2)}, 6–3
Win	7.	Jul 2010	ITF Cáceres, Spain	Hard	(Spain) Rocío de la Torre-Sánchez	6–3, 6–0
Loss	3.	Oct 2010	ITF Taipei, Taiwan	Hard	(China) Zheng Saisai	6–3, 6–3
Win	8.	Mar 2011	ITF Sanya, China	Hard	(France) Iryna Brémond	3–6, 7–6^{(4)}, 6–2
Loss	4.	Jul 2011	Challenger de Granby, Canada	Hard	(Canada) Stéphanie Dubois	6–2, 2–6, 6–1
Loss	5.	May 2012	ITF Changwon, Korea	Hard	(China) Duan Yingying	6–4, 6–3
Loss	6.	Jun 2012	ITF Goyang, Korea	Hard	(China) Duan Yingying	6–3, 6–3
Loss	7.	Jul 2012	ITF Incheon, Korea	Hard	(Chinese Taipei) Chan Chin-wei	3–6, 6–2, 6–1
Loss	8.	Sep 2012	ITF Cairns, Australia	Hard	(Australia) Sacha Jones	6–0, 6–2
Loss	9.	Jun 2013	ITF Gimcheon, Korea	Hard	(China) Zhao Di	4–6, 6–2, 6–3
Loss	10.	Jul 2013	ITF Bangkok, Thailand	Hard	(China) Lu Jiajing	7–6^{(6)},7–5
Win	9.	Nov 2013	ITF Phuket, Thailand	Hard (i)	(Thailand) Nicha Lertpitaksinchai	6–2, 7–6^{(7)}
Win	10.	Nov 2013	ITF Phuket, Thailand	Hard (i)	(China) Lu Jiajing	0–6, 7–6^{(2)}, 6–3
Win	11.	Jan 2014	ITF Sharm El Sheikh, Egypt	Hard	(Russia) Polina Leykina	6–1, 7–5
Win	12.	Feb 2014	ITF Nonthaburi, Thailand	Hard	(China) Liu Fangzhou	6–3, 6–3
Loss	11.	Apr 2017	ITF Hua Hin, Thailand	Hard	(Thailand) Patcharin Cheapchandej	1–6, 5–7
Loss	12.	Jul 2017	ITF Anning, China	Clay	(Hong Kong) Eudice Chong	4–6, 6–4, 3–6
Win	13.	Jul 2017	ITF Hong Kong, China	Hard	(Japan) Kumi So	6–1, 6–3
Win	14.	Aug 2017	ITF Tsukuba, Japan	Hard	(Canada) Carol Zhao	7–5, 7–6^{(4)}

=== Doubles: 15 (7 titles, 8 runner-ups) ===
Result	No.	Date	Tournament	Surface	Partner	Opponents	Score
Win	1.	Oct 2006	ITF Jakarta, Indonesia	Hard	(Switzerland) Stefania Boffa	(Indonesia) Sandy Gumulya (Indonesia) Lavinia Tananta	6–4, 6–4
Win	2.	Nov 2007	ITF Pune, India	Hard	(Thailand) Varatchaya Wongteanchai	(Indonesia) Wynne Prakusya (Indonesia) Angelique Widjaja	1–6, 7–5, [10–5]
Loss	1.	Jun 2008	ITF Båstad, Sweden	Clay	(Germany) Anne Schäfer	(Slovakia) Klaudia Boczová (Netherlands) Nicole Thyssen	2–6, 1–6
Loss	2.	Dec 2008	ITF Sorrento, Italy	Hard	(United Kingdom) Jade Curtis	(Australia) Tyra Calderwood (Australia) Shannon Golds	4–6, 6–3, [8–10]
Win	3.	Dec 2008	ITF Delhi, India	Hard	(Chinese Taipei) Hwang I-hsuan	(United Kingdom) Emily Webley-Smith (United States) Megan Moulton-Levy	6–3, 7–6^{(4)}
Loss	3.	Apr 2009	ITF Balikpapan, Indonesia	Hard	(United Kingdom) Emily Webley-Smith	(Indonesia) Yayuk Basuki (Indonesia) Romana Tedjakusuma	3–6, 3–6
Win	4.	Aug 2009	ITF Nonthaburi, Thailand	Hard	(Indonesia) Jessy Rompies	(Japan) Tomoko Dokei (South Korea) Yoo Mi	6–2, 1–6, [10–8]
Win	5.	Aug 2009	ITF Nonthaburi, Thailand	Hard	(China) Yang Zijun	(Indonesia) Beatrice Gumulya (Indonesia) Lavinia Tananta	6–4, 6–3
Win	6.	May 2010	ITF Tanjung Selor, Indonesia	Hard	(China) Liu Wanting	(Indonesia) Jessy Rompies (Thailand) Noppawan Lertcheewakarn	7–6^{(5)}, 6–3
Loss	4.	Jan 2014	ITF Hong Kong, China	Hard	(Kazakhstan) Zarina Diyas	(Japan) Misa Eguchi (Japan) Eri Hozumi	4–6, 2–6
Win	7.	Feb 2014	ITF Nonthaburi, Thailand	Hard	(Thailand) Varatchaya Wongteanchai	(China) Tian Ran (China) Tang Haochen	2–6, 6–2, [12–10]
Loss	5.	Apr 2014	ITF Nanning, China	Hard	(China) Zheng Saisai	(China) Zhang Kailin (China) Han Xinyun	6–7^{(8)}, 6–7^{(3)}
Loss	6.	Apr 2014	Anning Open, China	Clay	(Thailand) Varatchaya Wongteanchai	(China) Zhang Kailin (China) Han Xinyun	4–6, 2–6
Loss	7.	Jul 2015	ITF Zhengzhou, China	Hard	(China) Liu Chang	(South Korea) Han Na-lae (South Korea) Jang Su-jeong	3–6, 0–6
Loss	8.	Nov 2016	ITF Hua Hin, Thailand	Hard	(Thailand) Kamonwan Buayam	(Malaysia) Jawairiah Noordin (Indonesia) Jessy Rompies	4–6, 3–6
