= Liang Chen =

Chinese tennis player (born 1989)

Liang Chen 梁晨
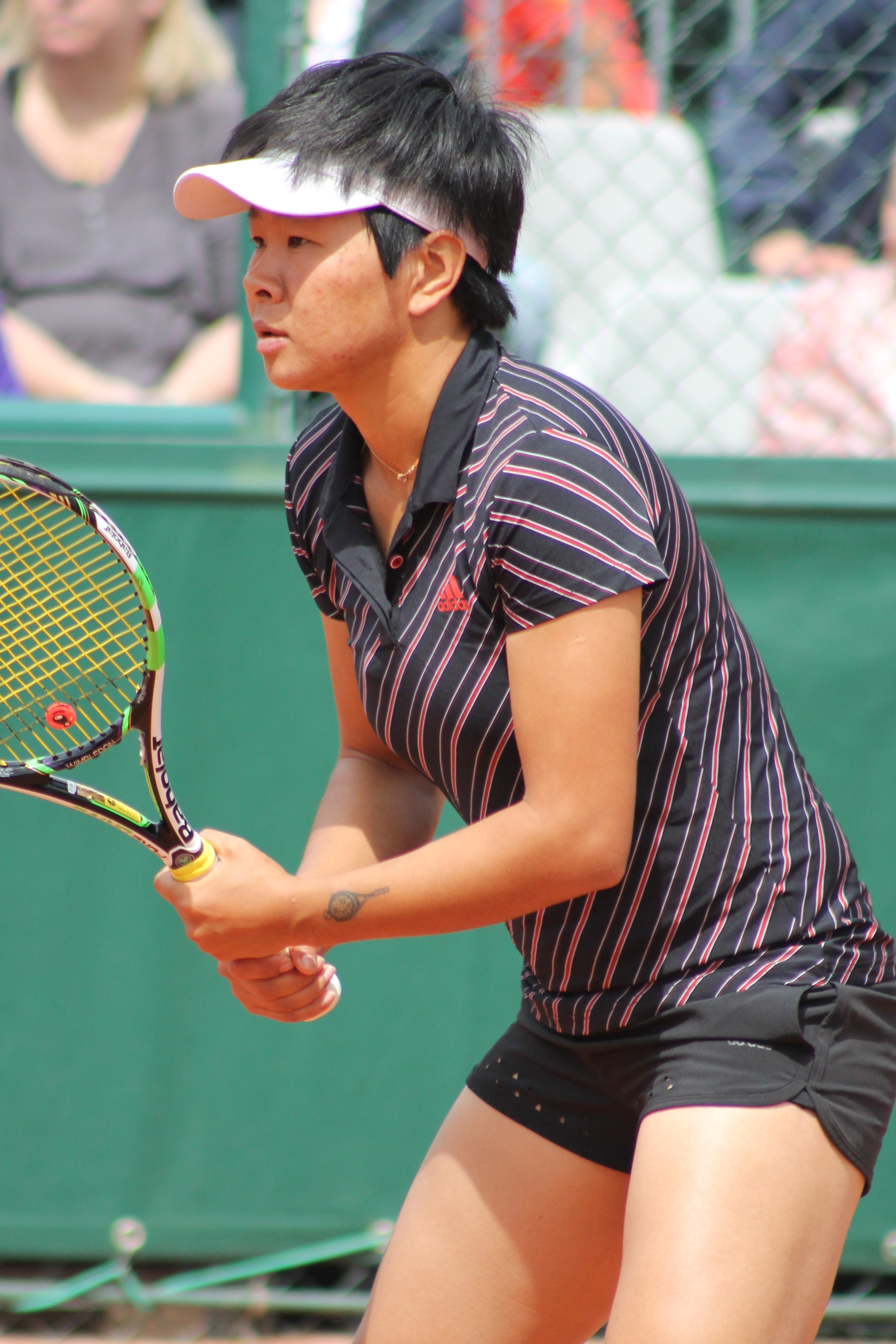
- Country (sports): China
- Residence: Beijing, China
- Born: 25 February 1989 (age 37) Xuzhou, China
- Plays: Right-handed (two-handed backhand)
- Prize money: $508,338

Singles
- Career record: 182–132
- Career titles: 4 ITF
- Highest ranking: No. 342 (21 September 2009)

Doubles
- Career record: 239–189
- Career titles: 6 WTA, 1 WTA 125
- Highest ranking: No. 35 (26 October 2015)

Grand Slam doubles results
- Australian Open: 3R (2017)
- French Open: 2R (2016, 2017)
- Wimbledon: 1R (2015, 2016)
- US Open: 1R (2015, 2016)

Liang Chen (Chinese: 梁辰; pinyin: Liáng Chén; born 25 February 1989) is a former professional Chinese tennis player.

Liang has a career-high singles ranking of 342, achieved on 21 September 2009. Her career-high WTA doubles ranking of 35, she reached on 26 October 2015.

Liang made her WTA Tour main-draw doubles debut, partnering Zhou Yimiao at the 2009 Guangzhou International Women's Open. They lost in the first round to Peng Shuai and Xu Yifan.

At the 2011 Guangzhou International Women's Open, partnering Tian Ran, they defeated Alona Bondarenko and Mariya Koryttseva 4–6, 6–3, [12–10] in the first round before losing to the second seeds Alberta Brianti and Petra Martić in the quarterfinals.

Playing for China Fed Cup team, she has a win-loss record of 3–2.

== WTA career finals ==
=== Doubles: 11 (6 titles, 5 runner-ups) ===
Legend
Grand Slam tournaments
WTA Elite Trophy (1–0)
Premier M & Premier 5
Premier (0–2)
International (5–3)

Result	W–L	Date	Tournament	Tier	Surface	Partner	Opponents	Score
Win	1–0	Sep 2014	Guangzhou Open, China	International	Hard	(Chinese Taipei) Chuang Chia-jung	(France) Alizé Cornet (Poland) Magda Linette	2–6, 7–6^{(7–3)}, [10–7]
Loss	1–1	Jan 2015	Shenzhen Open, China	International	Hard	(China) Wang Yafan	(Ukraine) Lyudmyla Kichenok (Ukraine) Nadiia Kichenok	4–6, 6–7^{(6–8)}
Win	2–1	Mar 2015	Malaysian Open	International	Hard	(China) Wang Yafan	(Ukraine) Yuliya Beygelzimer (Ukraine) Olga Savchuk	4–6, 6–3, [10–4]
Win	3–1	May 2015	Internationaux de Strasbourg, France	International	Clay	(Chinese Taipei) Chuang Chia-jung	(Ukraine) Nadiia Kichenok (China) Zheng Saisai	4–6, 6–4, [12–10]
Loss	3–2	Aug 2015	Connecticut Open, United States	Premier	Hard	(Chinese Taipei) Chuang Chia-jung	(Germany) Julia Görges (Czech Republic) Lucie Hradecká	3–6, 1–6
Win	4–2	Nov 2015	WTA Elite Trophy, China	Elite	Hard (i)	(China) Wang Yafan	(Spain) Anabel Medina Garrigues (Spain) Arantxa Parra Santonja	6–4, 6–3
Loss	4–3	Mar 2016	Malaysian Open	International	Hard	(China) Wang Yafan	(Thailand) Varatchaya Wongteanchai (China) Yang Zhaoxuan	6–4, 4–6, [7–10]
Loss	4–4	May 2016	Internationaux de Strasbourg, France	International	Clay	(Argentina) María Irigoyen	(Spain) Anabel Medina Garrigues (Spain) Arantxa Parra Santonja	2–6, 0–6
Win	5–4	Aug 2016	Jiangxi Open, China	International	Hard	(China) Lu Jingjing	(Japan) Shuko Aoyama (Japan) Makoto Ninomiya	3–6, 7–6^{(7–2)}, [13–11]
Loss	5–5	Sep 2016	Pan Pacific Open, Japan	Premier	Hard	(China) Yang Zhaoxuan	(India) Sania Mirza (Czech Republic) Barbora Strýcová	1–6, 1–6
Win	6–5	Apr 2018	İstanbul Cup, Turkey	International	Clay	(China) Zhang Shuai	(Switzerland) Xenia Knoll (United Kingdom) Anna Smith	6–4, 6–4

== WTA 125 tournament finals ==
=== Doubles: 1 (title) ===
Result	W–L	Date	Tournament	Surface	Partner	Opponents	Score
Win	1–0	Nov 2015	Hua Hin Challenger, Thailand	Hard	(China) Wang Yafan	(Thailand) Varatchaya Wongteanchai (China) Yang Zhaoxuan	6–3, 6–4

== ITF Circuit finals ==
Legend
$50,000 tournaments
$25,000 tournaments
$10/15,000 tournaments

=== Singles: 11 (4 titles, 7 runner–ups) ===
Result	W–L	Date	Tournament	Tier	Surface	Opponent	Score
Loss	0–1	5 April 2005	ITF Wuhan, China	10,000	Hard	(China) Sun Shengnan	3–6, 6–4, 3–6
Win	1–1	5 May 2008	ITF Tarakan, Indonesia	10,000	Hard	(Indonesia) Lavinia Tananta	6–7^{(1–7)}, 6–2, 6–3
Win	2–1	12 May 2008	ITF Bulungan, Indonesia	10,000	Hard	(Indonesia) Lavinia Tananta	6–7^{(5–7)}, 6–2, 6–2
Loss	2–2	23 June 2008	ITF Qianshan, China	25,000	Hard	(China) Chen Yanchong	6–4, 4–6, 4–6
Loss	2–3	16 February 2009	ITF Guangzhou, China	10,000	Hard	(China) Zhou Yimiao	3–6, 6–4, 0–6
Loss	2–4	18 May 2009	ITF Incheon, South Korea	25,000	Hard	(China) Han Xinyun	2–6, 2–6
Loss	2–5	24 August 2009	ITF Qianshan	10,000	Hard	(China) Sun Shengnan	3–6, 3–6
Loss	2–6	18 June 2011	ITF Pattaya, Thailand	10,000	Hard	(Thailand) Luksika Kumkhum	3–6, 4–6
Win	3–6	2 July 2011	ITF Pattaya	10,000	Hard	(Thailand) Luksika Kumkhum	2–6, 7–6^{(8–6)}, 7–5
Loss	3–7	31 December 2012	ITF Hong Kong	10,000	Hard	(China) Tian Ran	6–7^{(9–11)}, 6–2, 3–6
Win	4–7	20 December 2014	ITF Hong Kong	10,000	Hard	(China) Sun Xuliu	6–3, 7–5

=== Doubles: 25 (13 titles, 12 runner–ups) ===
Result	W–L	Date	Tournament	Tier	Surface	Partner	Opponents	Score
Win		13 February 2006	ITF Shenzhen, China	10,000	Hard	(China) Song Shanshan	(China) Hao Jie (China) Yang Shujing	7–5, 6–1
Loss		20 February 2006	ITF Shenzhen, China	10,000	Hard	(China) Hao Jie	(China) Chen Yanchong (China) Ji Chunmei	3–6, 0–6
Loss		8 October 2007	ITF Beijing, China	25,000	Hard	(China) Zhao Yijing	(China) Ji Chunmei (China) Sun Shengnan	2–6, 3–6
Win		21 February 2009	ITF Guangzhou, China	10,000	Hard	(China) Ji Chun-Mei	(China) Han Xinyun (China) Sun Shengnan	6–7, 6–2, [10–3]
Loss		7 June 2009	ITF Gimhae, Korea	25,000	Hard	(China) Sun Shengnan	(Indonesia) Yayuk Basuki (Indonesia) Romana Tedjakusuma	5–7, 1–6
Win		28 August 2009	ITF Qianshan, China	10,000	Hard	(China) Sun Shengnan	(Australia) Alison Bai (Australia) Sacha Jones	6–2, 6–4
Win		21 February 2011	ITF Antalya, Turkey	10,000	Hard	(China) Tian Ran	(Russia) Olga Panova (Russia) Marina Shamayko	6–7, 7–5, 6–4
Win		28 February 2011	ITF Antalya, Turkey	10,000	Hard	(China) Tian Ran	(Croatia) Darija Jurak (Poland) Katarzyna Kawa	4–6, 6–2, 6–4
Loss		3 April 2011	ITF Wenshan, China	50,000	Hard	(China) Tian Ran	(Japan) Shuko Aoyama (Japan) Rika Fujiwara	4–6, 0–6
Win		8 May 2011	ITF Bukhara, Uzbekistan	25,000	Hard	(South Korea) Han Sung-hee	(Russia) Nina Bratchikova (Kyrgyzstan) Ksenia Palkina	4–6, 7–6^{(5)}, [10–5]
Win		18 June 2011	ITF Pattaya, Thailand	10,000	Hard	(China) Zhao Yijing	(Thailand) Luksika Kumkhum (Thailand) Napatsakorn Sankaew	1–6, 6–1, [10–7]
Loss		25 June 2011	ITF Pattaya, Thailand	10,000	Hard	(China) Zhao Yijing	(Japan) Emi Mutaguchi (Japan) Kotomi Takahata	4–6, 7–5, [5–10]
Win		2 July 2011	ITF Pattaya, Thailand	10,000	Hard	(China) Zhao Yijing	(Japan) Misa Eguchi (Japan) Akiko Omae	6–3, 6–4
Win		9 July 2011	ITF Pattaya, Thailand	25,000	Hard	(China) Zhao Yijing	(Japan) Yurina Koshino (Thailand) Varatchaya Wongteanchai	6–1, 6–4
Win		28 August 2011	ITF Saitama, Japan	10,000	Hard	(China) Liu Wanting	(Japan) Akari Inoue (Japan) Ayumi Oka	6–3, 5–7, [11–9]
Loss		9 January 2012	ITF Pingguo, China	25,000	Hard	(China) Tian Ran	(Chinese Taipei) Kao Shao-yuan (China) Zhao Yijing	6–3, 6–7, [7–10]
Loss		12 March 2012	ITF Sanya, China	25,000	Hard	(China) Zhou Yimiao	(Japan) Erika Sema (China) Zheng Saisai	2–6, 2–6
Loss		28 May 2012	ITF Gimcheon, Korea	25,000	Hard	(China) Sun Shengnan	(China) Hu Yue-Yue (China) Xu Yifan	0–6, 6–3, [7–10]
Win		25 June 2012	ITF Incheon, Korea	25,000	Hard	(China) Sun Shengnan	(South Korea) Kim Ji-young (South Korea) Yoo Mi	6–3, 6–2
Win		9 July 2012	ITF Huzhu, China	15,000	Clay	(China) Li Ting	(China) Li Yihong (China) Tian Ran	7–5, 3–6, [10–6]
Loss		3 January 2013	Blossom Cup, China	50,000	Hard	(China) Sun Shengnan	(Ukraine) Irina Buryachok (Ukraine) Nadiia Kichenok	6–3, 3–6, [10–12]
Win		26 May 2014	ITF Zhengzhou, China	25,000	Hard	(Chinese Taipei) Chan Chin-wei	(China) Han Xinyun (China) Zhang Kailin	6–3, 6–3
Loss		23 June 2014	ITF Xi'an, China	50,000	Hard	(China) Yang Zhaoxuan	(China) Lu Jiajing (China) Wang Yafan	3–6, 6–7^{(2)}
Loss		6 September 2014	ITF Yeongwol, South Korea	10,000	Hard	(China) Liu Chang	(South Korea) Choi Ji-hee (South Korea) Lee So-ra	2–6, 5–7
Loss		16 April 2016	Pingshan Open, China	50,000	Hard	(China) Wang Yafan	(Japan) Shuko Aoyama (Japan) Makoto Ninomiya	6–7^{(5)}, 4–6
