= Tian Ran =

Chinese tennis player

Tian Ran 田然
- Full name: Tian Ran
- Country (sports): China
- Residence: Zhengzhou, China
- Born: 8 January 1994 (age 32) Henan, China
- Plays: Right-handed (two-handed backhand)
- Prize money: $87,567

Singles
- Career record: 126–126
- Career titles: 3 ITF
- Highest ranking: No. 297 (24 October 2016)

Doubles
- Career record: 106–98
- Career titles: 7 ITF
- Highest ranking: No. 212 (10 June 2013)

Tian Ran (Chinese: 田然; pinyin: Tián Rán; Mandarin pronunciation: [tʰjɛ̌n ɻǎn]; born 8 January 1994) is a China former tennis player.

Tian has a career-high singles ranking of world No. 297, achieved on 24 October 2016. She also has a highest WTA doubles ranking of 212, achieved on 10 June 2013.

Tian made her WTA Tour main-draw debut at the 2011 Guangzhou International Women's Open partnering Liang Chen. In the first round, they defeated Alona Bondarenko and Mariya Koryttseva 4–6, 6–3, [12–10] before losing to the second seeds Alberta Brianti and Petra Martić in the quarterfinals.

== ITF finals ==
=== Singles (3–2) ===
Legend $100,000 tournaments $75,000 tournaments $50,000 tournaments $25,000 tournaments $10,000 tournaments	Finals by surface Hard (3–2) Clay (0–0) Grass (0–0) Carpet (0–0)

Outcome	No.	Date	Tournament	Surface	Opponent	Score
Winner	1.	5 April 2010	ITF Ningbo, China	Hard	(China) Zheng Saisai	6–2, 6–3
Winner	2.	31 December 2012	ITF Hong Kong, China	Hard	(China) Liang Chen	7–6, 2–6, 6–3
Runner-up	1.	10 March 2014	ITF Shenzhen, China	Hard	(China) Zhang Kailin	0–6, 7–5, 1–6
Winner	3.	13 December 2015	ITF Hong Kong, China	Hard	(Finland) Emma Laine	6–2, 6–3
Runner-up	2.	13 March 2016	ITF Nanjing, China	Hard	(China) Liu Fangzhou	3–6, 2–6

=== Doubles (7–9) ===
Legend $100,000 tournaments $75,000 tournaments $50,000 tournaments $25,000 tournaments $15,000 tournaments $10,000 tournaments	Finals by surface Hard (6–6) Clay (1–2) Grass (0–1) Carpet (0–0)

Outcome	No.	Date	Tournament	Surface	Partner	Opponents	Score
Winner	1.	28 June 2010	ITF Hefei, China	Hard	(China) Zheng Saisai	(China) Bai Xi (China) Zhang Kailin	6–0, 6–4
Winner	2.	21 February 2011	Antalya, Turkey	Hard	(China) Liang Chen	(Russia) Olga Panova (Russia) Marina Shamayko	6–7, 7–5, 6–4
Winner	3.	28 February 2011	Antalya, Turkey	Hard	(China) Liang Chen	(Croatia) Darija Jurak (Poland) Katarzyna Kawa	4–6, 6–2, 6–4
Runner-up	1.	3 April 2011	Wenshan, China	Hard	(China) Liang Chen	(Japan) Shuko Aoyama (Japan) Rika Fujiwara	4–6, 0–6
Runner-up	2.	9 January 2012	Pingguo, China	Hard	(China) Liang Chen	(Chinese Taipei) Kao Shao-yuan (China) Zhao Yijing	6–3, 6–7, [7–10]
Runner-up	3.	2 July 2012	Huzhu, China	Clay	(China) Wang Yafan	(China) Li Yihong (China) Zhang Kailin	6–3, 4–6, [6–10]
Runner-up	4.	9 July 2012	Huzhu, China	Clay	(China) Li Yihong	(China) Li Ting (China) Liang Chen	5–7, 6–3, 6–10
Winner	4.	31 December 2012	Hong Kong, China	Hard	(China) Tang Haochen	(Japan) Eri Hozumi (Japan) Miyu Kato	6–2, 6–1
Runner-up	5.	20 May 2013	Tarakan, Indonesia	Hard	(China) Tang Haochen	(United Kingdom) Naomi Broady (Serbia) Teodora Mirčić	2–6, 6–1, [5–10]
Runner-up	6.	10 February 2014	Nonthaburi, Thailand	Hard	(China) Tang Haochen	(Thailand) Varatchaya Wongteanchai (Hong Kong) Zhang Ling	6–2, 2–6, [10–12]
Winner	5.	28 April 2014	Seoul, Korea	Hard	(China) Liu Chang	(South Korea) Han Na-lae (South Korea) Yoo Mi	6–4, 6–7, [10–6]
Winner	6.	25 May 2014	Tianjin, China	Hard	(China) Liu Chang	(Oman) Fatma Al-Nabhani (India) Ankita Raina	6–1, 7–5
Runner-up	7.	6 March 2015	Port Pirie, Australia	Hard	(China) Liu Chang	(Australia) Jessica Moore (Australia) Abbie Myers	0–6, 3–6
Runner-up	8.	15 March 2015	Mildura, Australia	Grass	(China) Wang Yan	(Japan) Hiroko Kuwata (Japan) Yuuki Tanaka	2–6, 0–6
Runner-up	9.	25 October 2015	ITF Suzhou, China	Hard	(China) Zhang Kailin	(China) Yang Zhaoxuan (China) Zhang Yuxuan	6–7^{(4–7)}, 2–6
Win	7.	3 July 2016	ITF Helsingborg, Sweden	Clay	(China) You Xiaodi	(Sweden) Cornelia Lister (Russia) Anna Morgina	6–4, 6–3
