= Liu Chang (tennis) =

Chinese tennis player

Liu Chang 刘畅
- Country (sports): China
- Born: 1 August 1990 (age 36)
- Plays: Right (two-handed backhand)
- Prize money: $145,839

Singles
- Career record: 240–179
- Career titles: 3 ITF
- Highest ranking: No. 171 (16 May 2016)

Doubles
- Career record: 124–108
- Career titles: 8 ITF
- Highest ranking: No. 153 (27 February 2017)

Liu Chang (Chinese: 刘畅; pinyin: Liú Chàng; Mandarin pronunciation: [ljǒʊ ʈʂʰâŋ]; born 1 August 1990) is a former professional Chinese tennis player.

On 16 May 2016, she reached her highest WTA singles ranking of 171. On 27 February 2017, she peaked at No. 153 in the WTA doubles rankings. In her career, Chang won three singles and eight doubles titles on the ITF Women's Circuit.

She won the biggest title in her career at the 2013 Beijing International Challenger, winning the doubles event with Zhou Yimiao.

== ITF Circuit finals ==
=== Singles: 5 (3 titles, 2 runner-ups) ===
Legend $50,000 tournaments $25,000 tournaments $15,000 tournaments $10,000 tournaments	Finals by surface Hard (2–2) Clay (1–0)

Result	W–L	Date	Tournament	Tier	Surface	Opponent	Score
Win	1–0	Jul 2012	ITF Huzhu, China	15,000	Clay	(China) Zhang Kailin	6–3, 6–4
Win	2–0	Mar 2015	ITF Jiangmen, China	10,000	Hard	(United Kingdom) Harriet Dart	6–3, 6–0
Loss	2–1	May 2015	ITF Wuhan, China	50,000	Hard	(China) Zhang Yuxuan	4–6, 0–6
Loss	2–2	Jun 2015	ITF Incheon, South Korea	25,000	Hard	(Japan) Risa Ozaki	7–5, 6–7^{(4)}, 3–6
Win	3–2	Mar 2016	ITF Nanjing, China	10,000	Hard	(China) You Xiaodi	4–6, 7–6^{(6)}, 6–1

=== Doubles: 17 (8 titles, 9 runner-ups) ===
Legend $75,000 tournaments $50,000 tournaments $25,000 tournaments $15,000 tournaments $10,000 tournaments	Finals by surface Hard (8–7) Clay (0–2)

Result	No.	Date	Tournament	Surface	Partner	Opponents	Score
Loss	1.	20 May 2012	ITF İstanbul, Turkey	Clay	(China) Zhang Nannan	(Turkey) Başak Eraydın (Turkey) İpek Soylu	6–3, 2–6, [5–10]
Win	1.	2 June 2013	ITF Changwon, South Korea	Hard	(Chinese Taipei) Chan Chin-wei	(South Korea) Kim Ju-eun (South Korea) Han Sung-hee	6–0, 6–2
Loss	2.	29 June 2013	ITF Huzhu, China	Clay	(China) Zhou Yimiao	(China) Sun Shengnan (Chinese Taipei) Chan Chin-wei	4–6, 3–6
Win	2.	14 July 2013	Beijing Challenger, China	Hard	(China) Zhou Yimiao	(Japan) Misaki Doi (Japan) Miki Miyamura	7–6^{(1)}, 6–4
Loss	3.	23 March 2014	ITF Shenzhen, China	Hard	(Chinese Taipei) Chan Chin-wei	(China) Zhang Kailin (China) Han Xinyun	3–6, 6–2, [11–13]
Win	3.	3 May 2014	ITF Seoul, Korea	Hard	(China) Tian Ran	(South Korea) Han Na-lae (South Korea) Yoo Mi	6–4, 6–7^{(5)}, [10–6]
Win	4.	23 May 2014	ITF Tianjin, China	Hard	(China) Tian Ran	(Oman) Fatma Al-Nabhani (India) Ankita Raina	6–1, 7–5
Loss	4.	6 September 2014	ITF Yeongwol, South Korea	Hard	(China) Liang Chen	(South Korea) Choi Ji-hee (South Korea) Lee So-ra	2–6, 5–7
Win	5.	10 October 2014	ITF Bangkok, Thailand	Hard	(China) Lu Jiajing	(Russia) Daria Gavrilova (Russia) Irina Khromacheva	6–4, 6–3
Win	6.	21 November 2014	ITF New Delhi, India	Hard	(China) Lu Jiajing	(Russia) Marina Melnikova (Belgium) Elise Mertens	6–3, 6–0
Loss	5.	6 March 2015	ITF Port Pirie, Australia	Hard	(China) Tian Ran	(Australia) Jessica Moore (Australia) Abbie Myers	0–6, 3–6
Win	7.	1 May 2015	ITF Nanning, China	Hard	(China) Lu Jiajing	(China) Yang Zhaoxuan (China) Ye Qiuyu	1–6, 6–1, [10–8]
Loss	6.	22 May 2015	ITF Wuhan, China	Hard	(China) Lu Jiajing	(Chinese Taipei) Chang Kai-chen (China) Han Xinyun	0–6, 3–6
Loss	7.	13 June 2015	ITF Goyang, South Korea	Hard	(China) Lu Jiajing	(South Korea) Han Na-lae (South Korea) Yoo Mi	1–6, 5–7
Loss	8.	24 July 2015	ITF Zhengzhou, China	Hard	(Hong Kong) Zhang Ling	(South Korea) Han Na-lae (South Korea) Jang Su-jeong	0–6, 3–6
Win	8.	23 April 2016	ITF Nanning, China	Hard	(Thailand) Varatchaya Wongteanchai	(Russia) Ksenia Lykina (United Kingdom) Emily Webley-Smith	6–1, 6–4
Loss	9.	21 July 2017	ITF Tianjin, China	Hard	(China) Lu Jiajing	(China) Jiang Xinyu (China) Tang Qianhui	4–6, 1–6
