= 2015 ITF Women's Circuit – Wuhan – Singles =

Wuhan – Singles
- 2015 ITF Women's Circuit – Wuhan

Final
- Champion: (China) Zhang Yuxuan
- Runner-up: (China) Liu Chang
- Score: 6–4, 6–0

Events
Singles	Doubles
← 2014 ·	ITF Women's Circuit – Wuhan	· 2016 →

Wang Qiang was the defending champion, but she chose to participate at the 2015 Internationaux de Strasbourg.

Zhang Yuxuan won the title, defeating Liu Chang in an all-Chinese final, 6–4, 6–0.

== Seeds ==
1. (Thailand) Luksika Kumkhum (first round)
2. (China) Yang Zhaoxuan (second round)
3. (China) Han Xinyun (second round)
4. (Uzbekistan) Sabina Sharipova (quarterfinals)
5. (India) Ankita Raina (second round)
6. (Hong Kong) Zhang Ling (semifinals)
7. (Chinese Taipei) Chang Kai-chen (quarterfinals)
8. (United States) Lauren Embree (first round)

== Main draw ==
=== Key ===
- Q = Qualifier
- WC = Wild card
- LL = Lucky loser
- Alt = Alternate
- SE = Special exempt
- PR = Protected ranking
- ITF = ITF entry
- JE = Junior exempt
- w/o = Walkover
- r = Retired
- d = Defaulted
- SR = Special ranking

=== Finals ===
Semifinals
(China) Liu Chang	6	6
WC	(China) Lu Jingjing	0	4
6	(Hong Kong) Zhang Ling	1	4
(China) Zhang Yuxuan	6	6

Final
(China) Liu Chang	4	0
(China) Zhang Yuxuan	6	6

=== Top half ===
First round
1	(Thailand) L Kumkhum	6^{5}	2
(China) C Liu	7^{7}	6
(Bulgaria) A Naydenova	6	1	6
Q	(China) J Kang	3	6	4
(Czech Republic) M Bouzková	5	1
(United States) A Guarachi	7	6
(Australia) A Bai	5	1
5	(India) A Raina	7	6
3	(China) X Han	6	6
Q	(China) X You	2	2
(Thailand) N Lertcheewakarn	6	3	4
(Russia) A Pivovarova	4	6	6
(China) Jia Lu	5	4
(United States) D Lao	7	6
WC	(China) Jin Lu	6	6
8	(United States) L Embree	1	1

Second round
(China) C Liu	6	6
(Bulgaria) A Naydenova	4	2
(United States) A Guarachi	7	6
5	(India) A Raina	5	2
3	(China) X Han	2	6	6^{4}
(Russia) A Pivovarova	6	4	7^{7}
(United States) D Lao	5	6	5
WC	(China) Jin Lu	7	3	7

Quarterfinals
(China) C Liu	4	7^{7}	6
(United States) A Guarachi	6	6^{4}	2
(Russia) A Pivovarova	2	1
WC	(China) Jin Lu	6	6

Semifinals
(China) C Liu	6	6
WC	(China) Jin Lu	0	4

=== Bottom half ===
First round
6	(Hong Kong) L Zhang	7^{7}	6
WC	(China) A Gai	6^{2}	4
(China) F Xun	3	6	4
(Japan) K Okamura	6	4	6
(China) Q Ye	7	6
(India) N Palha	5	4
Q	(China) D Zhao	4	4
4	(Uzbekistan) S Sharipova	6	6
7	(Chinese Taipei) K-c Chang	6	6
Q	(South Korea) N-r Kim	3	4
(Serbia) N Stojanović	6	6
WC	(China) S Liu	1	3
(China) Y Zhang	6	6
(India) N Chilumula	4	1
(China) R Tian	2	3
2	(China) Z Yang	6	6

Second round
6	(Hong Kong) L Zhang	7^{7}	7
(Japan) K Okamura	6^{4}	5
(China) Q Ye	2	1
4	(Uzbekistan) S Sharipova	6	6
7	(Chinese Taipei) K-c Chang	6	6
(Serbia) N Stojanović	2	4
(China) Y Zhang	6	2	6
2	(China) Z Yang	2	6	2

Quarterfinals
6	(Hong Kong) L Zhang	7	6
4	(Uzbekistan) S Sharipova	5	4
7	(Chinese Taipei) K-c Chang	3	4
(China) Y Zhang	6	6

Semifinals
6	(Hong Kong) L Zhang	1	4
(China) Y Zhang	6	6
