= 2015 ITF Women's Circuit – Wuhan – Doubles =

Wuhan – Doubles
- 2015 ITF Women's Circuit – Wuhan

Final
- Champions: (Chinese Taipei) Chang Kai-chen (China) Han Xinyun
- Runners-up: (China) Liu Chang (China) Lu Jiajing
- Score: 6–0, 6–3

Events
Singles	Doubles
← 2014 ·	ITF Women's Circuit – Wuhan	· 2016 →

Han Xinyun and Zhang Kailin were the defending champions, but Zhang chose not to participate. Han partnered Chang Kai-chen and successfully defended her title, defeating Liu Chang and Lu Jiajing in the final, 6–0, 6–3.

== Seeds ==
1. (China) Liu Chang / (China) Lu Jiajing (final)
2. (Chinese Taipei) Chang Kai-chen / (China) Han Xinyun (champions)
3. (China) Yang Zhaoxuan / (China) Ye Qiuyu (semifinals)
4. (United States) Danielle Lao / (Thailand) Noppawan Lertcheewakarn (quarterfinals)

== Draw ==
=== Key ===
- Q = Qualifier
- WC = Wild card
- LL = Lucky loser
- Alt = Alternate
- SE = Special exempt
- PR = Protected ranking
- ITF = ITF entry
- JE = Junior exempt
- w/o = Walkover
- r = Retired
- d = Defaulted
- SR = Special ranking

First round
1	(China) C Liu (China) J Lu	6	6
(South Korea) N-r Kim (China) Y Li	2	2
(United States) L Embree (United States) A Guarachi	4	3
(India) N Palha (China) R Tian	6	6
3	(China) Z Yang (China) Q Ye	7	6
(India) N Chilumula (Germany) J Jebawy	5	2
WC	(China) A Gai (China) S Guo	2	3
(Australia) A Bai (Japan) K Okamura	6	6
(China) X You (China) A Zhu	6	2	[7]
(Uzbekistan) S Sharipova (Serbia) N Stojanović	4	6	[10]
(Bulgaria) A Naydenova (India) A Raina	4	5
4	(United States) D Lao (Thailand) N Lertcheewakarn	6	7
(Thailand) L Kumkhum (Hong Kong) L Zhang	7^{8}	3	[2]
(China) X Gao (China) D Zhao	6^{6}	6	[10]
(China) J Chen (China) F Xun	2	0
2	(Chinese Taipei) K-c Chang (China) X Han	6	6

Quarterfinals
1	(China) C Liu (China) J Lu	6	7
(India) N Palha (China) R Tian	1	5
3	(China) Z Yang (China) Q Ye	6	6
(Australia) A Bai (Japan) K Okamura	3	3
(Uzbekistan) S Sharipova (Serbia) N Stojanović	6	4	[10]
4	(United States) D Lao (Thailand) N Lertcheewakarn	4	6	[6]
(China) X Gao (China) D Zhao	2	3
2	(Chinese Taipei) K-c Chang (China) X Han	6	6

Semifinals
1	(China) C Liu (China) J Lu	6	6
3	(China) Z Yang (China) Q Ye	4	2
(Uzbekistan) S Sharipova (Serbia) N Stojanović	1	5
2	(Chinese Taipei) K-c Chang (China) X Han	6	7

Final
1	(China) C Liu (China) J Lu	0	3
2	(Chinese Taipei) K-c Chang (China) X Han	6	6
