= 2014 ITF Women's Circuit – Wuhan – Doubles =

Wuhan – Doubles
- 2014 ITF Women's Circuit – Wuhan

Final
- Champions: (China) Han Xinyun (China) Zhang Kailin
- Runners-up: (Japan) Miyu Kato (Japan) Makoto Ninomiya
- Score: 6–4, 6–2

Events
Singles	Doubles
← 2013 ·	ITF Women's Circuit – Wuhan	· 2015 →

The tournament in Wuhan was a new edition to ITF Women's Circuit.

Han Xinyun and Zhang Kailin won the inaugural event, defeating Miyu Kato and Makoto Ninomiya in the final, 6–4, 6–2.

== Seeds ==
1. (Belarus) Ilona Kremen / (Thailand) Noppawan Lertcheewakarn (first round)
2. (Chinese Taipei) Chan Chin-wei / (Chinese Taipei) Chuang Chia-jung (quarterfinals)
3. (Japan) Miki Miyamura / (Japan) Mari Tanaka (quarterfinals)
4. (Thailand) Luksika Kumkhum / (Thailand) Tamarine Tanasugarn (first round)

== Draw ==
=== Key ===
- Q = Qualifier
- WC = Wild card
- LL = Lucky loser
- Alt = Alternate
- SE = Special exempt
- PR = Protected ranking
- ITF = ITF entry
- JE = Junior exempt
- w/o = Walkover
- r = Retired
- d = Defaulted
- SR = Special ranking

First round
1	(Belarus) I Kremen (Thailand) N Lertcheewakarn	6^{7}	3
(Japan) J Namigata (China) Y Wang	7^{9}	6
WC	(China) A Gai (China) S Guo	4	6^{4}
(Slovenia) D Jakupović (Slovenia) N Kolar	6	7^{7}
4	(Thailand) L Kumkhum (Thailand) T Tanasugarn	6	4	[8]
(Japan) E Sema (Japan) Y Sema	3	6	[10]
(Japan) M Kato (Japan) M Ninomiya	7^{7}	6
WC	(China) H Tang (China) A Zhu	6^{3}	2
(Chinese Taipei) S-y Hsieh (China) J Lu	4	3
(China) X Han (China) K Zhang	6	6
(Serbia) T Čurović (India) A Raina	2	2
3	(Japan) M Miyamura (Japan) M Tanaka	6	6
(Australia) M Adamczak (Australia) A Bai	5	3
WC	(China) R Tian (China) L Zhu	7	6
Alt	(China) S Liu (China) Y Xin	2	0
2	(Chinese Taipei) C-w Chan (Chinese Taipei) C-j Chuang	6	6

Quarterfinals
(Japan) J Namigata (China) Y Wang	w/o
(Slovenia) D Jakupović (Slovenia) N Kolar
(Japan) E Sema (Japan) Y Sema	1	3
(Japan) M Kato (Japan) M Ninomiya	6	6
(China) X Han (China) K Zhang	6	6
3	(Japan) M Miyamura (Japan) M Tanaka	3	4
WC	(China) R Tian (China) L Zhu	6	4	[10]
2	(Chinese Taipei) C-w Chan (Chinese Taipei) C-j Chuang	2	6	[6]

Semifinals
(Japan) J Namigata (China) Y Wang	4	4
(Japan) M Kato (Japan) M Ninomiya	6	6
(China) X Han (China) K Zhang	6	6
WC	(China) R Tian (China) L Zhu	3	3

Final
(Japan) M Kato (Japan) M Ninomiya	4	2
(China) X Han (China) K Zhang	6	6
