= 2016 ITF Women's Circuit – Wuhan – Doubles =

Wuhan – Doubles
- 2016 ITF Women's Circuit – Wuhan

Final
- Champions: (Japan) Shuko Aoyama (Japan) Makoto Ninomiya
- Runners-up: (Chinese Taipei) Chang Kai-chen (China) Duan Yingying
- Score: 6–4, 6–4

Events
Singles	Doubles
← 2015 ·	ITF Women's Circuit – Wuhan	· 2017 →

Chang Kai-chen and Han Xinyun were the defending champions, but chose not to partner each other. Chang partnered Duan Yingying, while Han partnered Zhang Kailin. The two teams faced in the quarterfinals with Chang and Duan prevailing.

Shuko Aoyama and Makoto Ninomiya won the title, defeating Chang and Duan in the final, 6–4, 6–4.

== Seeds ==
1. (Japan) Shuko Aoyama / (Japan) Makoto Ninomiya (champions)
2. (China) Han Xinyun / (China) Zhang Kailin (quarterfinals)
3. (Russia) Valentyna Ivakhnenko / (Russia) Marina Melnikova (semifinals)
4. (Japan) Akiko Omae / (Thailand) Peangtarn Plipuech (semifinals)

== Draw ==
=== Key ===
- Q = Qualifier
- WC = Wild card
- LL = Lucky loser
- Alt = Alternate
- SE = Special exempt
- PR = Protected ranking
- ITF = ITF entry
- JE = Junior exempt
- w/o = Walkover
- r = Retired
- d = Defaulted
- SR = Special ranking

First round
1	(Japan) S Aoyama (Japan) M Ninomiya	6^{7}	6	[10]
WC	(China) Z Wei (China) Q Zhao	7^{9}	2	[6]
(Chinese Taipei) C-w Hsu (Chinese Taipei) Y-h Lee	3	4
(Thailand) L Kumkhum (China) Jia Lu	6	6
4	(Japan) A Omae (Thailand) Pe Plipuech	6	6
(Japan) J Namigata (Japan) E Sema	4	4
(Chinese Taipei) P-c Lee (China) Y Li	5	5
(China) F Xun (China) X You	7	7
(China) Jin Lu (Japan) A Okuno	6	6
WC	(China) A Gai (China) S Guo	4	4
(Thailand) N Lertpitaksinchai (Japan) M Ozeki	3	6	[4]
3	(Russia) V Ivakhnenko (Russia) M Melnikova	6	3	[10]
WC	(Chinese Taipei) K-c Chang (China) Y Duan	6	6
(China) Q Ye (Hong Kong) L Zhang	4	4
(Japan) M Inoue (Japan) Y Tanaka	4	4
2	(China) X Han (China) K Zhang	6	6

Quarterfinals
1	(Japan) S Aoyama (Japan) M Ninomiya	6	7
(Thailand) L Kumkhum (China) Jia Lu	1	5
4	(Japan) A Omae (Thailand) Pe Plipuech	4	7	[10]
(China) F Xun (China) X You	6	5	[2]
(China) Jin Lu (Japan) A Okuno	3	4
3	(Russia) V Ivakhnenko (Russia) M Melnikova	6	6
WC	(Chinese Taipei) K-c Chang (China) Y Duan	6	6
2	(China) X Han (China) K Zhang	3	3

Semifinals
1	(Japan) S Aoyama (Japan) M Ninomiya	6	6
4	(Japan) A Omae (Thailand) Pe Plipuech	1	4
(Russia) V Ivakhnenko (Russia) M Melnikova	6	6^{5}	[11]
WC	(Chinese Taipei) K-c Chang (China) Y Duan	4	7^{7}	[13]

Final
1	(Japan) S Aoyama (Japan) M Ninomiya	6	6
WC	(Chinese Taipei) K-c Chang (China) Y Duan	4	4
