= 2015 ITF Women's Circuit – Xuzhou =

- Date: 25–31 May
- Edition: 1st
- Category: ITF Women's Circuit
- Prize money: $50,000
- Surface: Hard
- Location: Xuzhou, China

Champions

Singles
- (Thailand) Luksika Kumkhum

Doubles
- (Chinese Taipei) Chang Kai-chen / (China) Han Xinyun
ITF Women's Circuit – Xuzhou	· 2016 →

The 2015 ITF Women's Circuit – Xuzhou was a professional tennis tournament played on outdoor hard courts. It was the first edition of the tournament and part of the 2015 ITF Women's Circuit, offering a total of $50,000 in prize money. It took place in Xuzhou, China, on 25–31 May 2015.

== Singles main draw entrants ==
=== Seeds ===
Country	Player	Rank^{1}	Seed
THA	Luksika Kumkhum	143	1
CHN	Liu Fangzhou	153	2
CHN	Han Xinyun	226	3
IND	Ankita Raina	227	4
HKG	Zhang Ling	228	5
TPE	Chang Kai-chen	257	6
SRB	Nina Stojanović	290	7
RUS	Anastasia Pivovarova	306	8

- ^{1} Rankings as of 18 May 2015

=== Other entrants ===
The following players received wildcards into the singles main draw:

- (China) Cao Siqi
- (China) Li Yixuan
- (China) Zhu Aiwen

The following players received entry from the qualifying draw:

- (China) Gai Ao
- (China) Kang Jiaqi
- (China) Yang Shangqing
- (China) Zhao Qianqian

The following players received a lucky loser spot into the main draw:

- (China) Chen Jiahui
- (China) Zhou Mingjun

== Champions ==
=== Singles ===
- (Thailand) Luksika Kumkhum def. (Chinese Taipei) Chang Kai-chen, 1–6, 7–5, 6–1

=== Doubles ===
- (Chinese Taipei) Chang Kai-chen / (China) Han Xinyun def. (China) Cao Siqi / (China) Zhou Mingjun, 6–3, 6–2
