= 2015 ITF Women's Circuit – Xuzhou – Doubles =

Xuzhou – Doubles
- 2015 ITF Women's Circuit – Xuzhou

Final
- Champions: (Chinese Taipei) Chang Kai-chen (China) Han Xinyun
- Runners-up: (China) Cao Siqi (China) Zhou Mingjun
- Score: 6–3, 6–2

Events
Singles	Doubles
← 2014 ·	ITF Women's Circuit – Xuzhou	· 2016 →

This was a new event in the 2015 ITF Women's Circuit.

The top seeds Chang Kai-chen and Han Xinyun won the inaugural event, defeating wildcards Cao Siqi and Zhou Mingjun in the final, 6–3, 6–2.

== Seeds ==
1. (Chinese Taipei) Chang Kai-chen / (China) Han Xinyun (champions)
2. (China) Ye Qiuyu / (Hong Kong) Zhang Ling (semifinals)
3. (China) Liu Chang / (China) Tian Ran (first round; retired)
4. (United States) Danielle Lao / (Thailand) Noppawan Lertcheewakarn (quarterfinals; withdrew)

== Draw ==
=== Key ===
- Q = Qualifier
- WC = Wild card
- LL = Lucky loser
- Alt = Alternate
- SE = Special exempt
- PR = Protected ranking
- ITF = ITF entry
- JE = Junior exempt
- w/o = Walkover
- r = Retired
- d = Defaulted
- SR = Special ranking

First round
1	(Chinese Taipei) K-c Chang (China) X Han	6	6
(Australia) A Bai (Thailand) L Kumkhum	0	0
(China) C Chen (China) S Liu	4	1
(China) J Chen (China) A Zhu	6	6
3	(China) C Liu (China) R Tian	4	0^{r}
(China) J Kang (China) Yix Li	6	0
(Russia) A Pivovarova (Serbia) N Stojanović	3	6	[10]
(Germany) J Jebawy (India) A Raina	6	1	[4]
(South Korea) N-r Kim (China) Yih Li	3	6	[7]
WC	(China) S Cao (China) M Zhou	6	2	[10]
(China) X Gao (China) D Zhao	3	3
4	(United States) D Lao (Thailand) N Lertcheewakarn	6	6
(China) S Chen (China) Y Xin	3	0
(China) X Sun (China) Q Zhao	6	6
(China) F Xun (China) X You	4	2
2	(China) Q Ye (Hong Kong) L Zhang	6	6

Quarterfinals
1	(Chinese Taipei) K-c Chang (China) X Han	6	6
(China) J Chen (China) A Zhu	4	0
(China) J Kang (China) Yix Li	4	1
(Russia) A Pivovarova (Serbia) N Stojanović	6	6
WC	(China) S Cao (China) M Zhou	w/o
4	(United States) D Lao (Thailand) N Lertcheewakarn
(China) X Sun (China) Q Zhao	7	3	[6]
2	(China) Q Ye (Hong Kong) L Zhang	5	6	[10]

Semifinals
1	(Chinese Taipei) K-c Chang (China) X Han	6	6
(Russia) A Pivovarova (Serbia) N Stojanović	4	2
WC	(China) S Cao (China) M Zhou	6	2	[10]
2	(China) Q Ye (Hong Kong) L Zhang	2	6	[6]

Final
1	(Chinese Taipei) K-c Chang (China) X Han	6	6
WC	(China) S Cao (China) M Zhou	3	2
