= 2014 ITF Women's Circuit – Wuhan =

- Date: 28 July–3 August
- Edition: 1st
- Category: ITF Women's Circuit
- Prize money: $50,000
- Surface: Hard
- Location: Wuhan, China

Champions

Singles
- (China) Wang Qiang

Doubles
- (China) Han Xinyun / (China) Zhang Kailin
ITF Women's Circuit – Wuhan	· 2015 →

The 2014 ITF Women's Circuit – Wuhan was a professional tennis tournament played on outdoor hard courts. It was the first edition of the tournament which was part of the 2014 ITF Women's Circuit, offering a total of $50,000 in prize money. It took place in Wuhan, China, on 28 July–3 August 2014.

== Singles main draw entrants ==
=== Seeds ===
Country	Player	Rank^{1}	Seed
THA	Luksika Kumkhum	110	1
CHN	Zheng Saisai	132	2
CHN	Duan Yingying	169	3
CHN	Wang Qiang	181	4
SLO	Nastja Kolar	197	5
JPN	Erika Sema	202	6
THA	Noppawan Lertcheewakarn	213	7
CHN	Zhu Lin	248	8

- ^{1} Rankings as of 21 July 2014

=== Other entrants ===
The following players received wildcards into the singles main draw:

- (China) Tang Haochen
- (China) Wang Yafan
- (China) Zhang Kailin
- (China) Zhang Yuxuan

The following players received entry from the qualifying draw:

- (Japan) Kyoka Okamura
- (Thailand) Tamarine Tanasugarn
- (China) Tian Ran
- (China) Yang Zhaoxuan

The following player received entry into the singles main draw as a lucky loser:

- (China) Hu Yueyue

== Champions ==
=== Singles ===
- (China) Wang Qiang def. (Thailand) Luksika Kumkhum 6–2, 6–2

=== Doubles ===
- (China) Han Xinyun / (China) Zhang Kailin def. (Japan) Miyu Kato / (Japan) Makoto Ninomiya 6–4, 6–2
