= 2016 ITF Women's Circuit – Wuhan – Singles =

Wuhan – Singles
- 2016 ITF Women's Circuit – Wuhan

Final
- Champion: (China) Wang Qiang
- Runner-up: (Thailand) Luksika Kumkhum
- Score: 7–5, 6–2

Events
Singles	Doubles
← 2015 ·	ITF Women's Circuit – Wuhan	· 2017 →

Zhang Yuxuan was the defending champion, but lost in the first round to Shuko Aoyama.

Wang Qiang won the title, defeating Luksika Kumkhum in the final, 7–5, 6–2.

== Seeds ==
1. (China) Wang Qiang (champion)
2. (Japan) Kurumi Nara (quarterfinals)
3. (China) Zhang Kailin (first round)
4. (China) Han Xinyun (second round)
5. (China) Duan Yingying (second round)
6. (Serbia) Ivana Jorović (first round)
7. (China) Wang Yafan (quarterfinals, retired)
8. (Poland) Urszula Radwańska (quarterfinals)

== Main draw ==
=== Key ===
- Q = Qualifier
- WC = Wild card
- LL = Lucky loser
- Alt = Alternate
- SE = Special exempt
- PR = Protected ranking
- ITF = ITF entry
- JE = Junior exempt
- w/o = Walkover
- r = Retired
- d = Defaulted
- SR = Special ranking

=== Finals ===
Semifinals
1	(China) Wang Qiang	6	6
(Japan) Shuko Aoyama	1	1
(Uzbekistan) Nigina Abduraimova	2	1
(Thailand) Luksika Kumkhum	6	6

Final
1	(China) Wang Qiang	7	6
(Thailand) Luksika Kumkhum	5	2

=== Top half ===
First round
1	(China) Q Wang	7^{7}	6
Q	(Japan) J Namigata	6^{0}	3
(Russia) V Ivakhnenko	6	6
WC	(China) S Cao	2	2
WC	(China) A Gai	6	6
(Croatia) T Mrdeža	2	3
(China) Jia Lu	4	1
7	(China) Y Wang	6	6
3	(China) K Zhang	4	4
(Italy) M Caregaro	6	6
(Japan) S Aoyama	6	6
(China) Y Zhang	1	4
Q	(Japan) A Omae	6	6
(Chinese Taipei) Y-h Lee	4	2
(South Korea) S-j Jang	6	6
6	(Serbia) I Jorović	2	4

Second round
1	(China) Q Wang	6	6
(Russia) V Ivakhnenko	3	1
WC	(China) A Gai	4	5
7	(China) Y Wang	6	7
(Italy) M Caregaro	6	5	4
(Japan) S Aoyama	0	7	6
Q	(Japan) A Omae	7^{7}	5	6
(South Korea) S-j Jang	6^{4}	7	2

Quarterfinals
1	(China) Q Wang	6	3
7	(China) Y Wang	3	0^{r}
(Japan) S Aoyama	2	6	6
Q	(Japan) A Omae	6	3	2

Semifinals
1	(China) Q Wang	6	6
(Japan) S Aoyama	1	1

=== Bottom half ===
First round
8	(Poland) U Radwańska	6	6
(Japan) A Okuno	4	1
(South Korea) N-l Han	7	1	6
Q	(Chinese Taipei) C-w Hsu	5	6	3
Q	(China) Z Sun	2	4
(Uzbekistan) N Abduraimova	6	6
WC	(China) S Guo	0	5
4	(China) X Han	6	7
5	(China) Y Duan	7^{7}	6
(China) Jin Lu	6^{1}	1
WC	(China) Y Sheng	0	3
(Thailand) L Kumkhum	6	6
(Australia) S Sanders	3	2
(Chinese Taipei) K-c Chang	6	6
(Russia) M Melnikova	1	0
2	(Japan) K Nara	6	6

Second round
8	(Poland) U Radwańska	3	6	6
(South Korea) N-l Han	6	3	2
(Uzbekistan) N Abduraimova	5	6	6
4	(China) X Han	7	2	0
5	(China) Y Duan	3	4
(Thailand) L Kumkhum	6	6
(Chinese Taipei) K-c Chang	4	4
2	(Japan) K Nara	6	6

Quarterfinals
8	(Poland) U Radwańska	0	6	6^{1}
(Uzbekistan) N Abduraimova	6	2	7^{7}
(Thailand) L Kumkhum	7	2	6
2	(Japan) K Nara	5	6	0

Semifinals
(Uzbekistan) N Abduraimova	2	1
(Thailand) L Kumkhum	6	6
