= Anthony Iluobe =

Nigerian politician (born 1945)

Chief Anthony Iluobe (JP) was born in 1945 to the family of Chief and Mrs Joseph Agimhelen Iluobe (JP) of Ivue-Uromi of the Uromi Kingdom in Edo State. He is the owner, managing director and chief executive officer of Iluobe Oil and Gas Marketing Co. Ltd. He studied engineering in Japan.

He was previously the Chairman of Edo State Water Board, the Chairman of Independent Petroleum Marketers of Nigeria (IPMAN) Edo state Chapter, and the leader of the legislative arm of the Etsako Central Local Government Council.

He is the father of Patrick Eromosele Iluobe, the minority leader of the Edo State House of Assembly. He is also the eldest brother of the jeweller Chris Aire. He lives in Edo State where he presides over his various business investments including Antilu Oil and Gas Ltd.

He is married to Magistrate Martina U. Iluobe, the chief Magistrate II of Edo State and the presiding Magistrate of the Customary Court in Ekpoma, Edo State.
