= 2016 ITF Women's Circuit – Wuhan =

- Date: 25–31 July
- Edition: 3rd
- Category: ITF Women's Circuit
- Prize money: $50,000
- Surface: Hard
- Location: Wuhan, China

Champions

Singles
- (China) Wang Qiang

Doubles
- (Japan) Shuko Aoyama / (Japan) Makoto Ninomiya
| ← 2015 · | ITF Women's Circuit – Wuhan | · 2017 → |

The 2016 ITF Women's Circuit – Wuhan was a professional tennis tournament played on outdoor hard courts. It was the 3rd edition of the tournament and part of the 2016 ITF Women's Circuit, offering a total of $50,000 in prize money. It took place in Wuhan, China, on 25–31 July 2016.

== Singles main draw entrants ==
=== Seeds ===
| Country | Player | Rank^{1} | Seed |
|---|---|---|---|
| CHN | Wang Qiang | 68 | 1 |
| JPN | Kurumi Nara | 90 | 2 |
| CHN | Zhang Kailin | 112 | 3 |
| CHN | Han Xinyun | 125 | 4 |
| CHN | Duan Yingying | 128 | 5 |
| SRB | Ivana Jorović | 141 | 6 |
| CHN | Wang Yafan | 147 | 7 |
| POL | Urszula Radwańska | 156 | 8 |

- ^{1} Rankings as of 18 July 2016.

=== Other entrants ===
The following player received a wildcard into the singles main draw:

- (China) Cao Siqi
- (China) Gai Ao
- (China) Guo Shanshan
- (China) Sheng Yuqi

The following players received entry from the qualifying draw:

- (Chinese Taipei) Hsu Ching-wen
- (Japan) Junri Namigata
- (Japan) Akiko Omae
- (China) Sun Ziyue

== Champions ==
=== Singles ===
- (China) Wang Qiang def. (Thailand) Luksika Kumkhum, 7–5, 6–2

=== Doubles ===
- (Japan) Shuko Aoyama / (Japan) Makoto Ninomiya def. (Chinese Taipei) Chang Kai-chen / (China) Duan Yingying, 6–4, 6–4
