= 2014 ITF Women's Circuit – Wuhan – Singles =

Wuhan – Singles
- 2014 ITF Women's Circuit – Wuhan

Final
- Champion: (China) Wang Qiang
- Runner-up: (Thailand) Luksika Kumkhum
- Score: 6–2, 6–2

Events
Singles	Doubles
← 2013 ·	ITF Women's Circuit – Wuhan	· 2015 →

The tournament in Wuhan was a new edition to the ITF Women's Circuit.

Wang Qiang won the inaugural event, defeating Luksika Kumkhum in the final, 6–2, 6–2.

== Seeds ==
1. (Thailand) Luksika Kumkhum (final)
2. (China) Zheng Saisai (first round)
3. (China) Duan Yingying (second round; retired)
4. (China) Wang Qiang (champion)
5. (Slovenia) Nastja Kolar (second round)
6. (Japan) Erika Sema (first round)
7. (Thailand) Noppawan Lertcheewakarn (second round)
8. (China) Zhu Lin (first round)

== Draw ==
=== Key ===
- Q = Qualifier
- WC = Wild card
- LL = Lucky loser
- Alt = Alternate
- SE = Special exempt
- PR = Protected ranking
- ITF = ITF entry
- JE = Junior exempt
- w/o = Walkover
- r = Retired
- d = Defaulted
- SR = Special ranking

=== Finals ===
Semifinals
1	(Thailand) Luksika Kumkhum	6	4	6
WC	(China) Wang Yafan	0	6	3
4	(China) Wang Qiang	6	6
(Japan) Miyu Kato	3	1

Final
1	(Thailand) Luksika Kumkhum	2	2
4	(China) Wang Qiang	6	6

=== Top half ===
First round
1	(Thailand) L Kumkhum	6	6
(India) A Raina	2	0
(Slovakia) M Hončová	0	3^{r}
(Uzbekistan) S Sharipova	6	5
WC	(China) Y Zhang	2	2
(Hong Kong) L Zhang	6	6
Q	(Japan) K Okamura	4	0
5	(Slovenia) N Kolar	6	6
3	(China) Y Duan	7	7^{7}
(Belarus) I Kremen	5	6^{2}
(Belgium) E Mertens	2	1
WC	(China) Y Wang	6	6
(Japan) Y Sema	0	2
(Japan) M Tanaka	6	6
WC	(China) K Zhang	6	6
8	(China) L Zhu	3	0

Second round
1	(Thailand) L Kumkhum	6	6
(Uzbekistan) S Sharipova	3	0
(Hong Kong) L Zhang	6	4	6
5	(Slovenia) N Kolar	4	6	4
3	(China) Y Duan	5	0^{r}
WC	(China) Y Wang	7	0
(Japan) M Tanaka	4	3
WC	(China) K Zhang	6	6

Quarterfinals
1	(Thailand) L Kumkhum	6	3	6
(Hong Kong) L Zhang	2	6	3
WC	(China) Y Wang	5	6	6
WC	(China) K Zhang	7	4	3

Semifinals
1	(Thailand) L Kumkhum	6	4	6
WC	(China) Y Wang	0	6	3

=== Bottom half ===
First round
7	(Thailand) N Lertcheewakarn	6	0	6
(Japan) J Namigata	1	6	4
WC	(China) H Tang	6	6^{5}	0
Q	(China) R Tian	1	7^{7}	6
(Slovenia) D Jakupović	3	1^{r}
(Australia) M Adamczak	6	0
Q	(Thailand) T Tanasugarn	7^{7}	4	0^{r}
4	(China) Q Wang	6^{2}	6	4
6	(Japan) E Sema	7	2	2
(China) F Liu	5	6	6
Q	(China) Z Yang	2^{r}
(China) X Han	5
LL	(China) Y Hu	6	3	6
(China) J Lu	4	6	4
(Japan) M Kato	7^{7}	6
2	(China) S Zheng	6^{3}	0

Second round
7	(Thailand) N Lertcheewakarn	0	6^{3}
Q	(China) R Tian	6	7^{7}
(Australia) M Adamczak	4	6^{2}
4	(China) Q Wang	6	7^{7}
(China) F Liu	7^{8}	5	0
(China) X Han	6^{6}	7	6
LL	(China) Y Hu	3	2
(Japan) M Kato	6	6

Quarterfinals
Q	(China) R Tian	6	4	2
4	(China) Q Wang	4	6	6
(China) X Han	7^{8}	4	3
(Japan) M Kato	6^{6}	6	6

Semifinals
4	(China) Q Wang	6	6
(Japan) M Kato	3	1
