= Mao Anying =

Chinese military officer and son of Mao Zedong

- 毛岸英
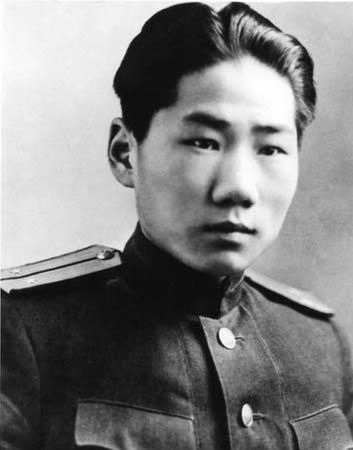
- Mao Anying in a Soviet officer's uniform
- Born: 24 October 1922; Changsha, Hunan, China
- Died: 25 November 1950 (aged 28); Tongchang, North Pyongan, Korea
- Burial place: Hoechang Chinese People's Volunteer Army Martyrs' Cemetery, Hoechang, South Pyongan, North Korea
- Spouse: Liu Siqi (m. 1949)
- Relatives: Mao Zedong (father); Yang Kaihui (mother)
- Military career
- Allegiance: Soviet Union; China People's Liberation Army; China People's Volunteer Army
- Rank: (Soviet Union) Lieutenant (Soviet Red Army)
- Conflicts: World War II; Chinese Civil War; Korean War †

Mao Anying
- Chinese: 毛岸英
Transcriptions
Standard Mandarin
- Hanyu Pinyin: Máo Ànyīng
- Wade–Giles: Mao2 An4-ying1

Mao Anying (Chinese: 毛岸英; pinyin: Máo Ànyīng; 24 October 1922 – 25 November 1950) was the eldest son of Mao Zedong and Yang Kaihui. After his mother's execution in 1930, he lived for several years in Shanghai before being sent to the Soviet Union, where he was educated and trained as an officer during the Second World War. He returned to China after the war and later joined the Chinese People's Volunteers in the Korean War as a Russian translator and secretary to its commander Peng Dehuai. He was killed when American aircraft bombed the Volunteers' headquarters with napalm on 25 November 1950, and he is buried in North Korea.

== Early life ==
Mao Anying was born on 24 October 1922, the eldest son of Mao Zedong and Yang Kaihui. In 1930, at the age of eight, he was jailed with his mother after her arrest, and she was executed on 14 November 1930 on the orders of the Hunan warlord He Jian. The underground Chinese Communist Party then took Mao Anying and his younger brothers Mao Anqing and Mao Anlong to Shanghai, where they were placed in a kindergarten run by the party's underground organization. Mao Anlong later died of illness, and the two older brothers were taken in by the pastor and underground party member Dong Jianwu. After the party's Shanghai network was broken up, the brothers lived rough, working as apprentices, collecting scrap, selling newspapers and pulling rickshaws.

== Soviet Union ==
In 1936, Dong Jianwu asked the warlord Zhang Xueliang to pay for the brothers and Dong's own son to study in the Soviet Union, and Zhang agreed to cover the cost. They left Shanghai in early July 1936 on a French liner with Li Du, an anti-Japanese commander, and reached Marseille in August. After the Soviet consulate at first refused them visas, the group spent several months in Paris, and the consulate eventually admitted only the two Mao brothers. Early in 1937, they entered the Second International Children's Home in the western suburbs of Moscow, where Mao Anying took the name Sergei. He became secretary of the children's home's Komsomol branch and a member of a Komsomol district committee in Ivanovo. At the Interdom school in Ivanovo, he was known as Sergei Yun Fu. According to the CPPCC Daily, he rejected suggestions that he take Soviet citizenship, saying that he was Chinese and loved his country.

During World War II, Mao Anying completed a six-month course at a Soviet school for non-commissioned officers. In January 1943, he entered the Lenin Military-Political Academy in Moscow and joined the Communist Party of the Soviet Union. Accounts of his wartime service differ. Official Chinese accounts say that he fought on the European front, and The National Interest reported that he attended the Frunze Military Academy and served in an artillery regiment of the 1st Belorussian Front. A 2015 article in the CPPCC Daily drawing on Russian archival records stated instead that the Soviet authorities refused his repeated requests to fight and only let him visit the front as a trainee with the 2nd Belorussian Front from August to November 1944, which he later described to classmates as a lasting regret. The same article said that Joseph Stalin received him in Moscow in May 1945 and presented him with a pistol.

== Return to China ==
Mao Anying flew back to Yan'an on a Soviet aircraft. The party's official website dates his return to 7 January 1946, while the CPPCC Daily placed the flight in early December 1945. He joined the Chinese Communist Party in 1946. Mao Zedong told his son that his Soviet education had given him only half of the knowledge he needed and sent him to a "university of labour" in the countryside, where he worked for several months under the model farmer Wu Manyou. He later worked on land reform, in propaganda work and as a secretary, and he served as a secretary and translator in the party's Central Propaganda Department.

After the founding of the People's Republic of China in 1949, Mao Zedong sent him to Hunan to visit his mother's grave. Working under the alias Mao Yuanren, he became deputy secretary of the party branch at the Beijing General Machinery Factory and edited the factory's workers' newspaper. BBC News reported that, according to some former pupils of the Ivanovo children's home, he clashed with his father after his return over what he saw as a cult of personality.

== Korean War and death ==
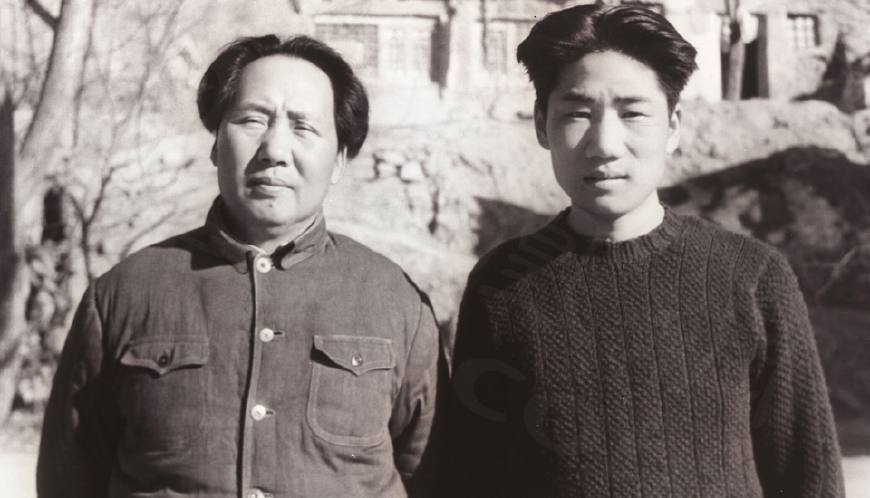
Mao Zedong and Mao Anying

Shortly after his wedding, Mao Anying asked Peng Dehuai to let him go to the front with the Chinese People's Volunteers in the Korean War. He crossed the Yalu River into Korea on 23 October 1950 with the headquarters of the 13th Army Group. The National Interest reported that he had wanted to serve as an infantryman, but Peng made him a Russian translator at the headquarters under the name "Secretary Liu". He worked as Peng's secretary and interpreter at the headquarters at Taeyu-dong in Tongchang County, and only Peng, Deng Hua, Hong Xuezhi and a few office staff knew who he was. On 7 November 1950, he interpreted at a meeting between Peng, Kim Il Sung and the Soviet ambassador Terentii Shtykov.

On the evening of 24 November 1950, an American reconnaissance aircraft flew over the headquarters, which had been set up in a gold mine near the Chinese border. The next morning, American bombers dropped napalm on the headquarters while Mao Anying was sorting Russian-language telegrams in the operations room, and he and the staff officer Gao Ruixin were killed. The National Interest identified the aircraft as four B-26 Invaders and said that the attack came at about 10 am. According to an eyewitness account published by the PLA Daily in 2015, his remains could be identified only by what was left of his watch. At the time, the only American units flying the B-26 in Korea were the 3rd Bomb Group and the 452nd Bomb Group. The National Interest also noted a claim that two South African Air Force pilots flying P-51 Mustangs were responsible, but it considered this unlikely because the single-engine P-51 could hardly be mistaken for the twin-engine B-26.

The National Interest reported that Peng delayed informing Mao Zedong of his son's death until January 1951. According to Xinhua, Mao Zedong said on hearing the news that war always cost lives and that his son had been an ordinary soldier whose death should not be treated as a major matter. Liu Siqi was not told until nearly three years later.

=== Fried rice story ===
A widely repeated account holds that Mao Anying gave away the headquarters' position by cooking egg fried rice on a stove, and The National Interest attributed the version it recounted to the memoir of General Yang Di, published by the People's Liberation Army. In November 2020, the Chinese Academy of History rejected the story, saying that linking Mao Anying with egg fried rice belittled his sacrifice and was spread by people with malicious intent. The academy also said that the Americans had located the headquarters by intercepting its radio communications, and the Wall Street Journal described its statement as part of an effort to rewrite history in support of Xi Jinping's national vision.

== Personal life ==
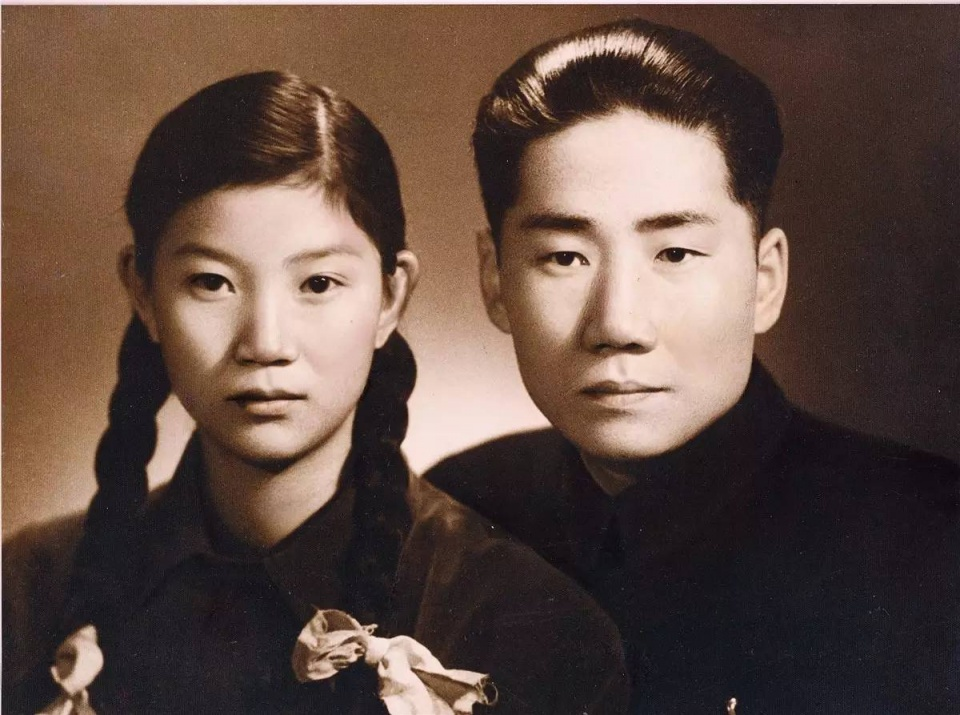
Mao Anying (right) and his wife Liu Siqi

Mao Anying first met Liu Siqi, a goddaughter of Mao Zedong, in Yan'an in July 1946. They grew close at Xibaipo in 1948, and they became engaged in September 1948, but Mao Zedong at first withheld his consent because Liu was a few months short of the minimum marriage age of 18. The couple married on 15 October 1949 at Zhongnanhai, and Mao Zedong gave them as a wedding present the overcoat he had worn during the Chongqing Negotiations of 1945.

== Burial and commemoration ==
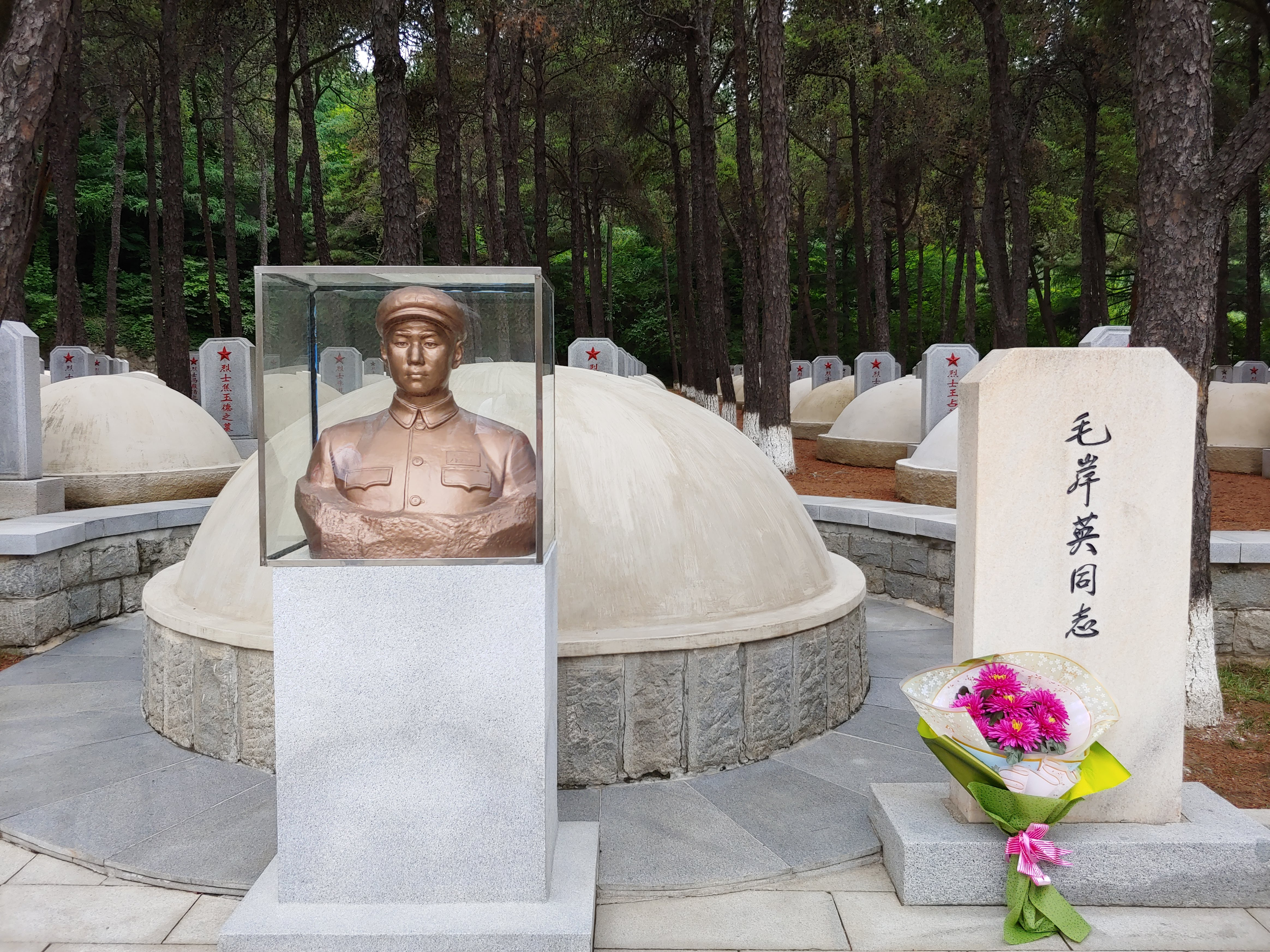
Mao Anying's tomb in Hoechang

Mao Anying was buried with other Chinese soldiers at the Chinese People's Volunteers Martyrs' Cemetery in Hoechang County, South Pyongan. Mao Zedong later paid from his own royalties for Liu Siqi and her younger sister to visit the grave. In October 2020, on the 70th anniversary of the Volunteers' entry into the war, the North Korean leader Kim Jong Un visited the cemetery and had a floral basket laid at Mao Anying's grave. A cenotaph for Mao Anying was later built at Bancang in Hunan, on the hillside to the north of his mother's tomb.
