= Transfer of People's Volunteer Army soldiers' remains from South Korea to China =

Post-Korean War process

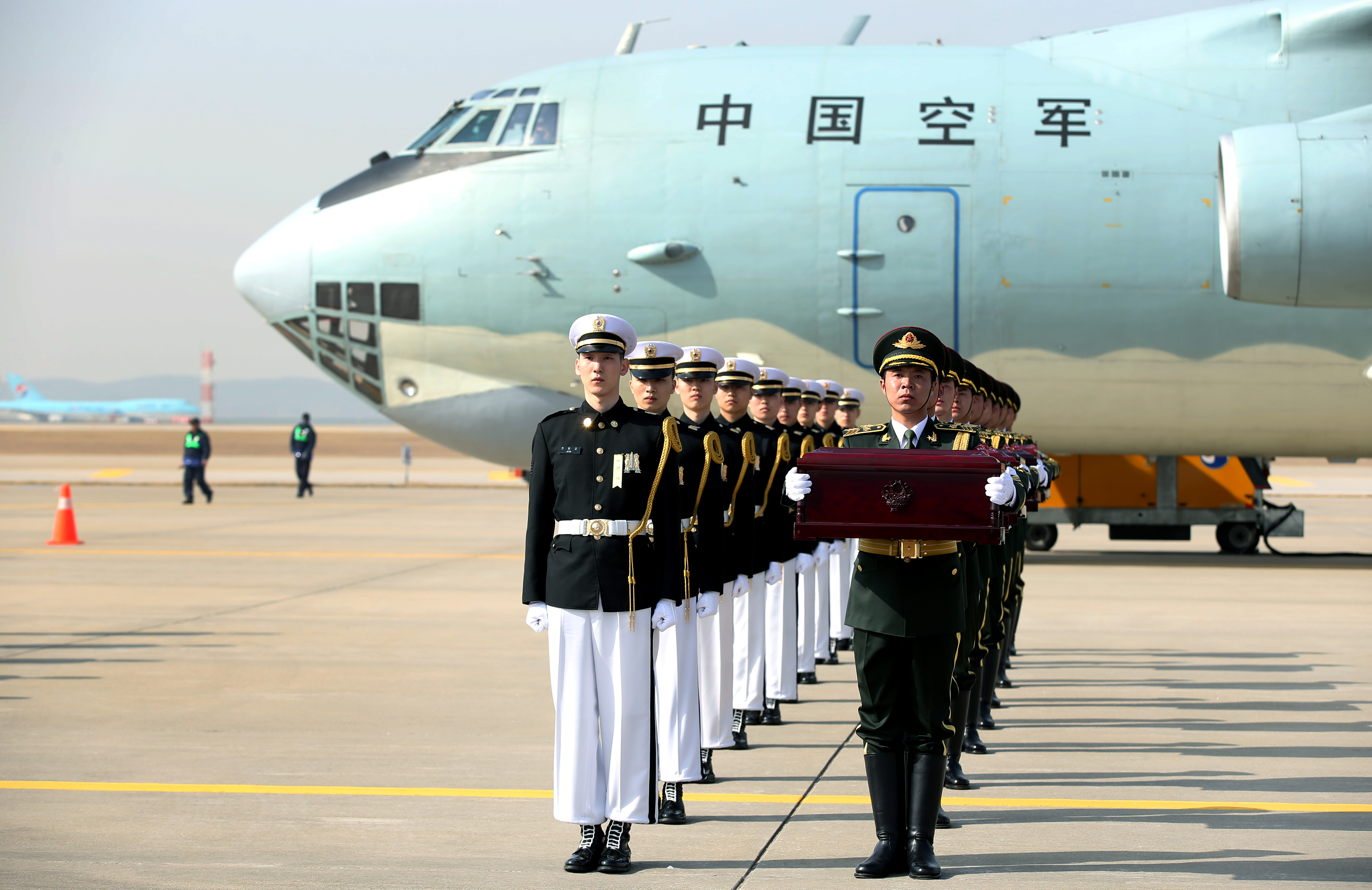
Chinese soldiers returning remains

The Transfer of People's Volunteer Army soldiers' remains from South Korea to China (Chinese: 在韩中国人民志愿军烈士遗骸回国; Korean: 중국군 유해 송환/中國軍遺骸送還) is the ongoing handover of remains of personnel of the Chinese People's Volunteer Army after the ceasefire of the Korean War. Following an agreement between South Korea and China, the remains of Chinese People's Volunteer Army personnel buried in South Korea are regularly exhumed and handed over. So far, the remains of 913 personnel have been handed over on nine occasions.

== Background ==
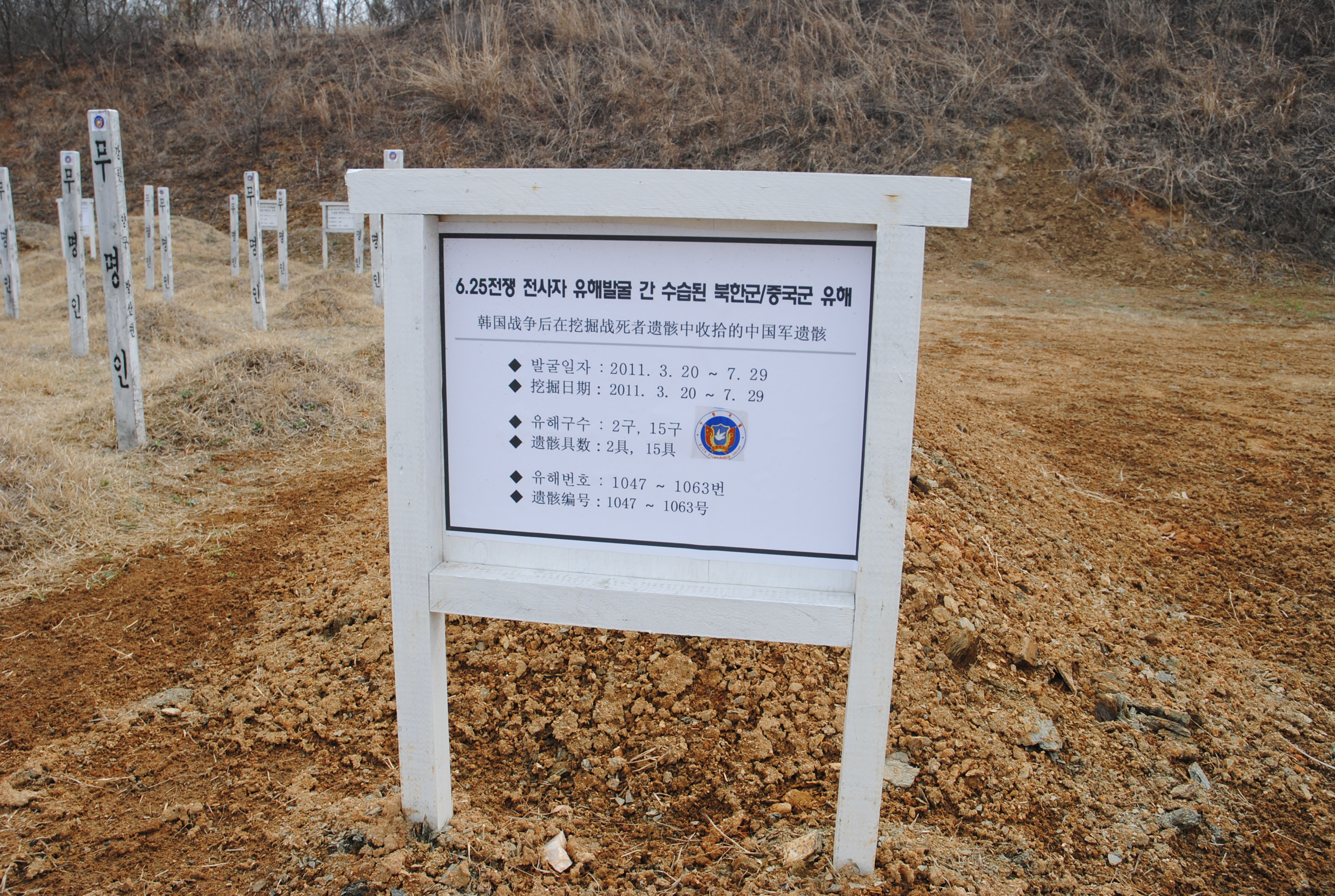
North Korean Army, Chinese Army cemetery Paju, Gyeonggi Province, South Korea

In 1954, after the Korean War ceasefire, the United Nations Command Military Armistice Commission (UNCMAC) established a temporary department called The Committee of Registration of Cemetery. China received over 10,000 remains from the Army over a monthlong period that began in September 1954. The Chinese transferred the remains to North Korea, where they were buried. In 1973, the Supreme Leader of North Korea Kim Il Sung built eight cemeteries for the Chinese People's Volunteer Army in Hoechang County, South Pyongan Province. Between 1981 and 1989, South Korea transferred 42 corpses through the North Korean government.

In 1991, North Korea and China withdrew their representation in UNCMAC, and the search for remains of was discontinued. In 1997, South Korea handed over the remains of one member of the Army. After that, North Korea rejected South Korea's requests to make handovers. Any remains found later were buried in a Chinese army cemetery at Paju, Gyeonggi Province, South Korea.

During the Two Sessions in China in 2011, Liu Changle, the deputy director of Education, Science, Health and Sports Committee of the National Committee of the Chinese People's Political Consultative Conference, proposed to take the remains of the Chinese People's Volunteer Army home; in the meantime, the Chinese Government's Ministry of Civil Affairs and Ministry of Foreign Affairs promoted taking the remains of the Chinese army home. It is calculated that around 115,217 Chinese army personnel are buried overseas; 99% of these personnel are buried in the Korean Peninsula.

== Negotiation ==
Chinese and South Korean leaders discussed the remains of Chinese Volunteer Army personnel in Korea when South Korean President Park Geun-hye visited China in June 2013. Further discussions took place in Seoul on 5 December. On 19 December, both parties began to excavate the remains, and on 22 January 2014, they met again in Beijing.

== Handover Collections ==
Dates of the Handovers of Remains
Collection	Time	Number of Remains
1	March 2014	437
2	March 2015	68
3	March 2016	36
4	March 2017	28
5	March 2018	20
6	April 2019	10 (remains & relics)
7	September 2020	117 (1368 corresponding relics)
8	September 2021	109 (1226 corresponding relics)
9	September 2022	88 (837 corresponding relics)

=== The First Collection ===
The first handover ceremony took place in March 2014.

The first collection consisted of remains found through excavation in multiple regions such as Gangwon Province and Gyeonggi Province. Many of the remains were unidentifiable. The first collection was initially estimated to contain the remains of 425 soldiers, but that estimate was later increased to 437.

At 6:30 a.m. on 28 March 2014, China and South Korea held a handover ceremony for these remains in Korea at Incheon International Airport. Chinese and Korean representatives signed the handover letter there. The Korean side sent twenty-two vehicles to transfer the remains. After the Chinese Air Force's special planes entered China's airspace, two J-11s came to escort. The welcome ceremony was held at the Shenyang Taoxian International Airport, China at 11:30 a.m.

At 12:00 a.m., under escort of honor guards, the remains of the volunteers were buried in the Shenyang Martyrs Cemetery. The cemetery was chosen because of its size and because most of the volunteer soldiers came from northeast China.

=== The Second Collection ===
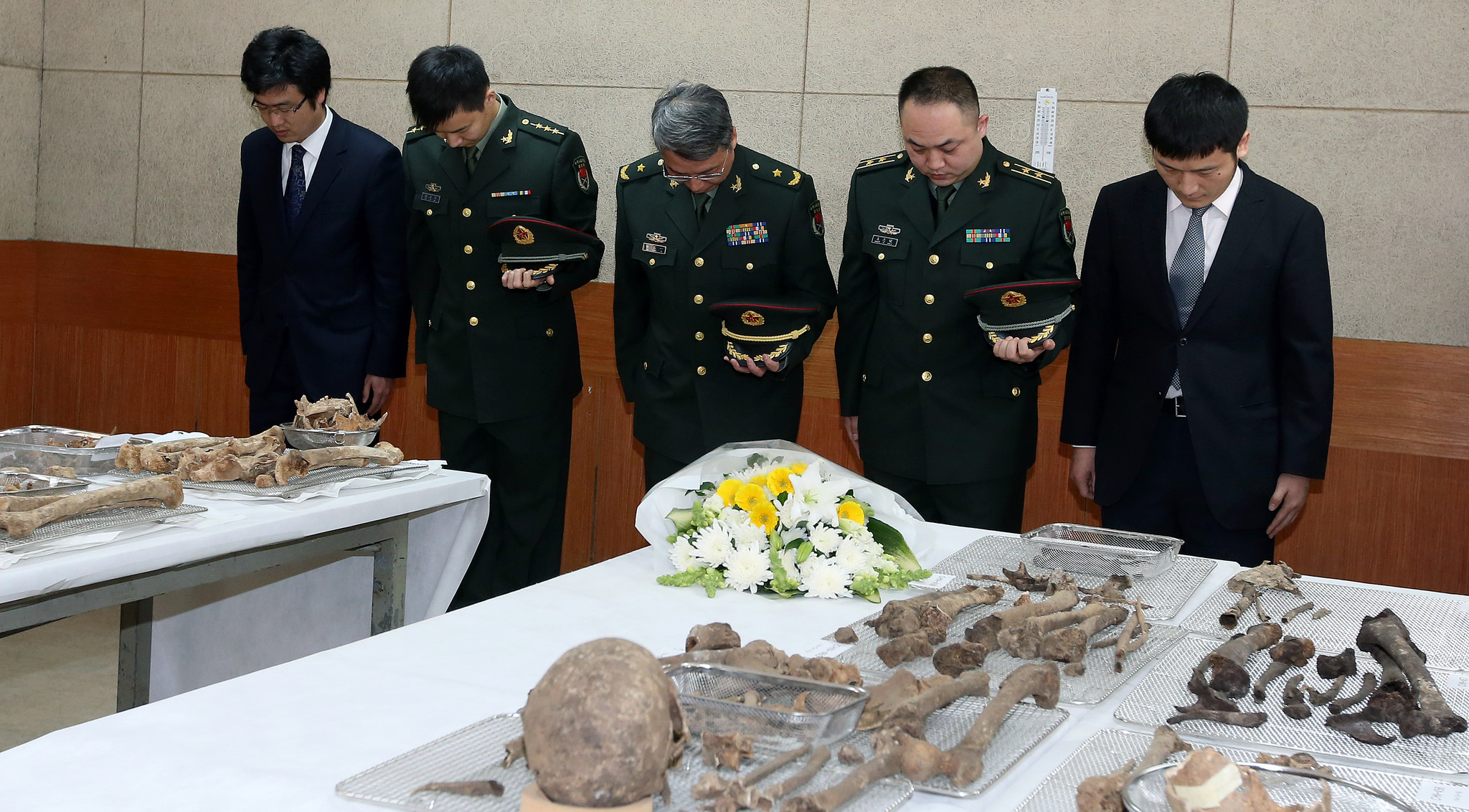
2015年3月16日，中韩双方对志愿军遗骸举行确认及默哀

External image
- "第二批在韩志愿军烈士遗骸迎接回国仪式在沈阳举行". 中央军事委员会. 20 March 2015.

On 20 March 2015, China and South Korea held a handover ceremony at Incheon Airport. Sixty-eight remains were repatriated. More than 260 officers and soldiers from an electronic countermeasures regiment and a mechanized infantry regiment (Chinese: 团; pinyin: tuan) participated in the repatriation ceremony. On 21 March, a burial ceremony was held in Shenyang Martyrs Cemetery.

=== The Third Collection ===
The remains were exhumed between March 2015 and November 2015 in Yeoncheon and Tiewon, Gyeonggi Province, South Korea. On 31 March, a Chinese Il76 transport aircraft, escorted by two J-11 fighter jets, arrived at Shenyang, carrying coffins that contained thirty-six remains of soldiers. The Ministry of Civil Affairs, the Political Work Department of the CMC, the Civil Affairs Department of Liaoning Province, and the Army Organs of the Northern Theater Command attended the receiving ceremony.

=== The Fourth Collection ===
External images
- "清明前 接他们回家". 央视新闻. 25 January 2019.
- "中韩28具志愿军遗骸交接仪式举行 起程回国". Yonhap News Agency. 22 March 2017.

On 27 February 2017, South Korean and Chinese working groups completed talks about the transfer of a fourth set of remains.

China and the Republic of Korea had held a joint burial ceremony for these remains in Incheon, South Korea on 20 March 2014. These remains were exhumed between March and November 2016.

On 22 March 2017, the remains were handed over at Incheon Airport; Chinese Vice Minister of Civil Affairs Sun Shaocheng attended the handover ceremony. He was the first high-level Chinese official to visit the Republic of Korea since the THAAD deployment.

=== The Fifth Collection ===
External image
- "清明前 接他们回家". 央视新闻. 25 January 2019.

On 28 March 2018, China and South Korea held a handover ceremony for the fifth collection of remains. The plane carried the remains and relics of 20 volunteers to Shenyang Taoxian Airport. On 29 March, the remains of the returning volunteers were buried in the Shenyang Martyrs Cemetery. Cui Fenglin, Vice Governor of Liaoning Province, presided over the ceremony.

=== The Sixth Collection ===
On 3 April 2019, the sixth collection of the remains of Chinese People's Volunteers in Korea arrived in Shenyang

On 23 January 2019, the Ministry of Veterans Affairs of China and the Ministry of National Defense of South Korea discussed the handover of the sixth collection of Volunteer Corps remains. On 6 March, the work team of the Ministry of National Defense of South Korea confirmed that ten of the fifteen remains of Korean War victims excavated in Inje, Hoengseong, Hongcheon, Yeoncheon and other places from 2017 to 2018 belonged to Chinese soldiers. The remains were handed over on 3 April. The remains arrived at Shenyang Airport, where a reception ceremony was held. Director Qin Zhe of the Veterans Affairs Office of Liaoning Province presided.

=== The Seventh Collection ===
On 25 September 2020, in the seventh collection, name seals left by the soldiers of the Korean Volunteer Army were discovered

On 27 September 2020, South Korea handed over 117 remains at Incheon Airport. Cui Jonggeon, the first official of the Ministry of Foreign Affairs of South Korea, and Chang Zhengguo, Vice Minister of Veterans Affairs of China attended the ceremony. The remains had been excavated in Arrow Hill (the battle area of the Battle of White Horse) in the North Korean Demilitarized Zone in 2019.

A Yun-20 plane carried the remains. After they had arrived in China, three of the remains were identified using relics.

=== The Eight Collection ===
On 2 September 2021, South Korea handed over 109 remains at Incheon Airport. The transfer ceremony was overseen by Xing Haiming.

=== The Ninth Collection ===
On 16 September 2022, South Korea handed over 88 remains at Incheon Airport.

=== The Tenth Collection ===
On 23 November 2023, South Korea handed over 25 remains at Incheon Airport. The remains were buried at a martyrs' cemetery in Shenyang on the following day.
