= 2015 ITF Women's Circuit – Xuzhou – Singles =

Xuzhou – Singles
- 2015 ITF Women's Circuit – Xuzhou

Final
- Champion: (Thailand) Luksika Kumkhum
- Runner-up: (Chinese Taipei) Chang Kai-chen
- Score: 1–6, 7–5, 6–1

Events
Singles	Doubles
← 2014 ·	ITF Women's Circuit – Xuzhou	· 2016 →

This was a new event to the 2015 ITF Women's Circuit.

The top seed Luksika Kumkhum won the inaugural event, defeating sixth-seeded Chang Kai-chen in the final, 1–6, 7–5, 6–1.

== Seeds ==
1. (Thailand) Luksika Kumkhum (champion)
2. (China) Liu Fangzhou (first round)
3. (China) Han Xinyun (semifinals)
4. (India) Ankita Raina (semifinals)
5. (Hong Kong) Zhang Ling (first round)
6. (Chinese Taipei) Chang Kai-chen (final)
7. (Serbia) Nina Stojanović (second round)
8. (Russia) Anastasia Pivovarova (first round)

== Main draw ==
=== Key ===
- Q = Qualifier
- WC = Wild card
- LL = Lucky loser
- Alt = Alternate
- SE = Special exempt
- PR = Protected ranking
- ITF = ITF entry
- JE = Junior exempt
- w/o = Walkover
- r = Retired
- d = Defaulted
- SR = Special ranking

=== Finals ===
Semifinals
1	(Thailand) Luksika Kumkhum	4	6	6
4	(India) Ankita Raina	6	3	2
3	(China) Han Xinyun	1	2
6	(Chinese Taipei) Chang Kai-chen	6	6

Final
1	(Thailand) Luksika Kumkhum	1	7	6
6	(Chinese Taipei) Chang Kai-chen	6	5	1

=== Top half ===
First round
1	(Thailand) L Kumkhum	6	7
WC	(China) Y Li	0	5
(China) X Sun	7^{7}	5	6
Q	(China) Q Zhao	6^{5}	7	3
(China) X Gao	6	6
(China) Q Ye	3	0
(China) F Xun	7	6
5	(Hong Kong) L Zhang	5	2
4	(India) A Raina	6	6
Q	(China) S Yang	1	3
(United States) D Lao	6	6
(Czech Republic) M Bouzková	1	3
(China) D Zhao	0	2
(Thailand) N Lertcheewakarn	6	6
WC	(China) S Cao	6	6
8	(Russia) A Pivovarova	4	4

Second round
1	(Thailand) L Kumkhum	6	6
(China) X Sun	0	0
(China) X Gao	6	6
(China) F Xun	0	1
4	(India) A Raina	6	6
(United States) D Lao	2	2
(Thailand) N Lertcheewakarn	0	0^{r}
WC	(China) S Cao	6	3

Quarterfinals
1	(Thailand) L Kumkhum	6	3
(China) X Gao	2	1^{r}
4	(India) A Raina	6	7
WC	(China) S Cao	4	5

Semifinals
1	(Thailand) L Kumkhum	4	6	6
4	(India) A Raina	6	3	2

=== Bottom half ===
First round
7	(Serbia) N Stojanović	6	6
(Japan) M Kijima	4	4
(Germany) J Jebawy	3	0
Q	(China) A Gai	6	6
LL	(China) J Chen	6	6
(China) X You	2	4
(Australia) A Bai	1	2
3	(China) X Han	6	6
6	(Chinese Taipei) K-c Chang	6	6
LL	(China) M Zhou	2	2
WC	(China) A Zhu	4	6	3
(South Korea) N-r Kim	6	3	6
(China) R Tian	0	4
Q	(China) J Kang	6	6
(China) Jin Lu	6	6
2	(China) F Liu	1	3

Second round
7	(Serbia) N Stojanović	6	2	5
Q	(China) A Gai	1	6	7
LL	(China) J Chen	3	2
3	(China) X Han	6	6
6	(Chinese Taipei) K-c Chang	6	6
(South Korea) N-r Kim	3	0
Q	(China) J Kang	4	4
(China) Jin Lu	6	6

Quarterfinals
Q	(China) A Gai	7^{7}	0	4
3	(China) X Han	6^{4}	6	6
6	(Chinese Taipei) K-c Chang	6	6
(China) Jin Lu	2	3

Semifinals
3	(China) X Han	1	2
6	(Chinese Taipei) K-c Chang	6	6
