= ITF Women's Circuit – Xuzhou =

ITF Women's Tour
- Event name: Xuzhou
- Location: Xuzhou, China
- Venue: Xuzhou Zhuben Tennis Center
- Category: ITF Women's Circuit
- Surface: Hard
- Draw: 32S/32Q/16D
- Prize money: $50,000

The ITF Women's Circuit – Xuzhou was a tournament for professional female tennis players played on outdoor hard courts. The event was classified as a $50,000 ITF Women's Circuit tournament and was held in Xuzhou, China, in 2015.

== Past finals ==
=== Singles ===
Year	Champion	Runner-up	Score
2015	(Thailand) Luksika Kumkhum	(Chinese Taipei) Chang Kai-chen	1–6, 7–5, 6–1

=== Doubles ===
Year	Champions	Runners-up	Score
2015	(Chinese Taipei) Chang Kai-chen (China) Han Xinyun	(China) Cao Siqi (China) Zhou Mingjun	6–3, 6–2
