= 2015 ITF Women's Circuit – Wuhan =

- Date: 18–24 May
- Edition: 2nd
- Category: ITF Women's Circuit
- Prize money: $50,000
- Surface: Hard
- Location: Wuhan, China

Champions

Singles
- (China) Zhang Yuxuan

Doubles
- (Chinese Taipei) Chang Kai-chen / (China) Han Xinyun
← 2014 ·	ITF Women's Circuit – Wuhan	· 2016 →

The 2015 ITF Women's Circuit – Wuhan was a professional tennis tournament played on outdoor hard courts. It was the second edition of the tournament and part of the 2015 ITF Women's Circuit, offering a total of $50,000 in prize money. It took place in Wuhan, China, on 18–24 May 2015.

== Singles main draw entrants ==
=== Seeds ===
Country	Player	Rank^{1}	Seed
THA	Luksika Kumkhum	144	1
CHN	Yang Zhaoxuan	183	2
CHN	Han Xinyun	206	3
UZB	Sabina Sharipova	215	4
IND	Ankita Raina	229	5
HKG	Zhang Ling	230	6
TPE	Chang Kai-chen	262	7
USA	Lauren Embree	265	8

- ^{1} Rankings as of 11 May 2015

=== Other entrants ===
The following players received wildcards into the singles main draw:

- (China) Gai Ao
- (China) Liu Siqi
- (China) Lu Jingjing

The following players received entry from the qualifying draw:

- (China) Kang Jiaqi
- (South Korea) Kim Na-ri
- (China) You Xiaodi
- (China) Zhao Di

== Champions ==
=== Singles ===
- (China) Zhang Yuxuan def. (China) Liu Chang, 6–4, 6–0

=== Doubles ===
- (Chinese Taipei) Chang Kai-chen / (China) Han Xinyun def. (China) Liu Chang / (China) Lu Jiajing, 6–0, 6–3
