= Chris Aire =

African-American jeweler and timepiece designer

Christopher Aire
- Born: December 25, 1964 (age 61); Ivue-Uromi, Nigeria
- Education: California State University, Long Beach
- Occupations: CEO, Solid 21 Incorporated
- Spouse: Diana Durojaiye (3 children)

Christopher Aire (born December 25, 1964) is a Nigerian born African American jeweler and timepiece designer. He is the president of Solid 21 Incorporated and the founder of his eponymous brand, Chris Aire.

== Early years ==
Chris Aire was born in Ivue-Uromi, Edo, Nigeria. His father Joseph Agimenlen Iluobe was a Nigerian oil mogul and businessman and his mother, Victoria Isesele Iluobe was a homemaker. He graduated Immaculate Conception College, Benin City, Nigeria. Thereafter, his father wanted him to join the family business. Aire started helping his father manage the family oil haulage business but quickly realized that he had a strong desire to work independently. After working briefly for his father's company Iluobe Oil, he decided to leave Nigeria and move to the United States to further his education and attend California State University Long Beach. While in college, Aire worked menial jobs in fast-food restaurants and pursued his education during the day. He graduated with a bachelor's degree in acting and directing.

Breaking into the acting scene proved to be unsuccessful, so Aire decided to channel his talents towards music. He joined a group called Raw Silk, collaborating and performing with the band for a few years. The band did not experience the type of success he had hoped for, so he decided to break away in hopes of creating a solo career.

Later, He accepted a job as an apprentice to a jeweler in Los Angeles, California, called P-5 Jewelers. Soon after, he enrolled at the Gemological Institute of America, Carlsbad where he received his diamond-grading diploma.

== Career and brand ==
In 1996, after six years of apprenticeship with P-5 Jewelers, he set out on his own. He had saved $5,000 to start his namesake brand that designs and sells fine jewelry and watches.

Shortly after founding Chris Aire, he met Gary Payton, an NBA superstar who was then with the Seattle SuperSonics. Payton showed interest in his designs and invited Aire to see him in Miami at a charity event the following month. In Miami, he landed a substantial order, solidifying his position in the jewelry market

Aire opened his first boutique at the Transcorp Hilton Hotel in Abuja, Nigeria, in 2012. In 2014, Aire moved his United States office from downtown Los Angeles to his US flagship boutique in Beverly Hills.

== Recognition and titles ==
The Los Angeles Times described Aire as "The King of Bling". Rolling Stone magazine called him "The Emperor of Ice". Aire has been featured in several other magazines such as Forbes, Wall Street Journal, IDEX, JCK MAGAZINE, Elle, Vogue, Black Enterprise, Robb Report, Watch time, QP magazine, Rapaport magazine, and Los Angeles Magazine.

He has also been featured on CNN, Konnect Africa, Washington Times, USA Today, and the Discovery Channel.

== Personal life ==
Aire is married to Diana Atinuke Durojaiye. They have three children. He is based in Los Angeles and visits Nigeria often.
