= Hoechang County =

Hoech'ang County 회창군
- County

Korean transcription(s)
  - Chosŏn'gŭl: 회창군
  - Hancha: 檜倉郡
  - McCune-Reischauer: Hoech'ang-gun
  - Revised Romanization: Hoechang-gun
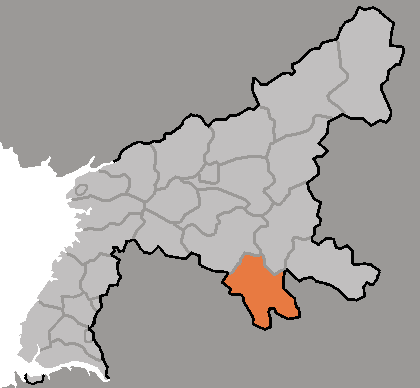
- Map of South Pyongan showing the location of Hoechang
- Country: North Korea
- Province: South P'yŏngan
- Administrative divisions: 1 ŭp, 4 workers' districts, 17 ri

Area
  - Total: 681.43 km^{2} (263.10 sq mi)

Population (2008)
  - Total: 89,959
  - Density: 132.02/km^{2} (341.92/sq mi)

Hoech'ang County is a kun (county) in South P'yŏngan province, North Korea.

== History ==
Before 1945, most of the territory that now comprises Hoech'ang, was part of neighbouring Sŏngch'ŏn county. In 1952 four townships from Sŏngch'ŏn (Sungin-myŏn, Kuryong-myŏn, Rungjung-myŏn, and Taegok-myŏn) and one from Koksan (Pongmyŏng-myŏn) were split from their counties and merged to form Hoech'ang County.

== Administrative divisions ==
The district is split into 1 ŭp (town), 4 rodongjagu (workers' districts) and 17 ri (villages):

- Hoech'ang-ŭp
  회창읍/檜倉邑
- Hwajŏl-lodongjagu
  화전로동자구/花田勞動者區
- Paegryŏng-rodongjagu
  백령로동자구/白嶺勞動者區
- Sinjang-rodongjagu
  신작로동자구/新作勞動者區
- Sŏkhwang-rodongjagu
  석황로동자구/石黃勞動者區
- Chidong-ri
  지동리/芝洞里
- Chŏngsal-li
  정산리/井山里
- Hoeul-li
  회운리/回雲里
- Hwasim-ri
  화심리/花尋里
- Kaul-li
  가운리/佳雲里
- Kuryong-ri
  구룡리/九龍里
- Muno-ri
  문어리/文語里
- Naedong-ri
  내동리/內洞里
- Sinsŏng-ri
  신성리/新成里
- Songdong-ri
  송동리/松洞里
- Sungin-ri
  숭인리/崇仁里
- Taebong-ri
  대봉리/大峰里
- Taedŏng-ri
  대덕리/大德里
- Taegong-ri
  대곡리/大谷里
- Taeg'il-li
  택인리/擇仁里
- Tŏngryŏl-li
  덕련리/德連里
- Yangch'ul-li
  양춘리/陽春里
