= Wang Qiang (tennis) =

Chinese tennis player (born 1992)

Wang Qiang 王蔷
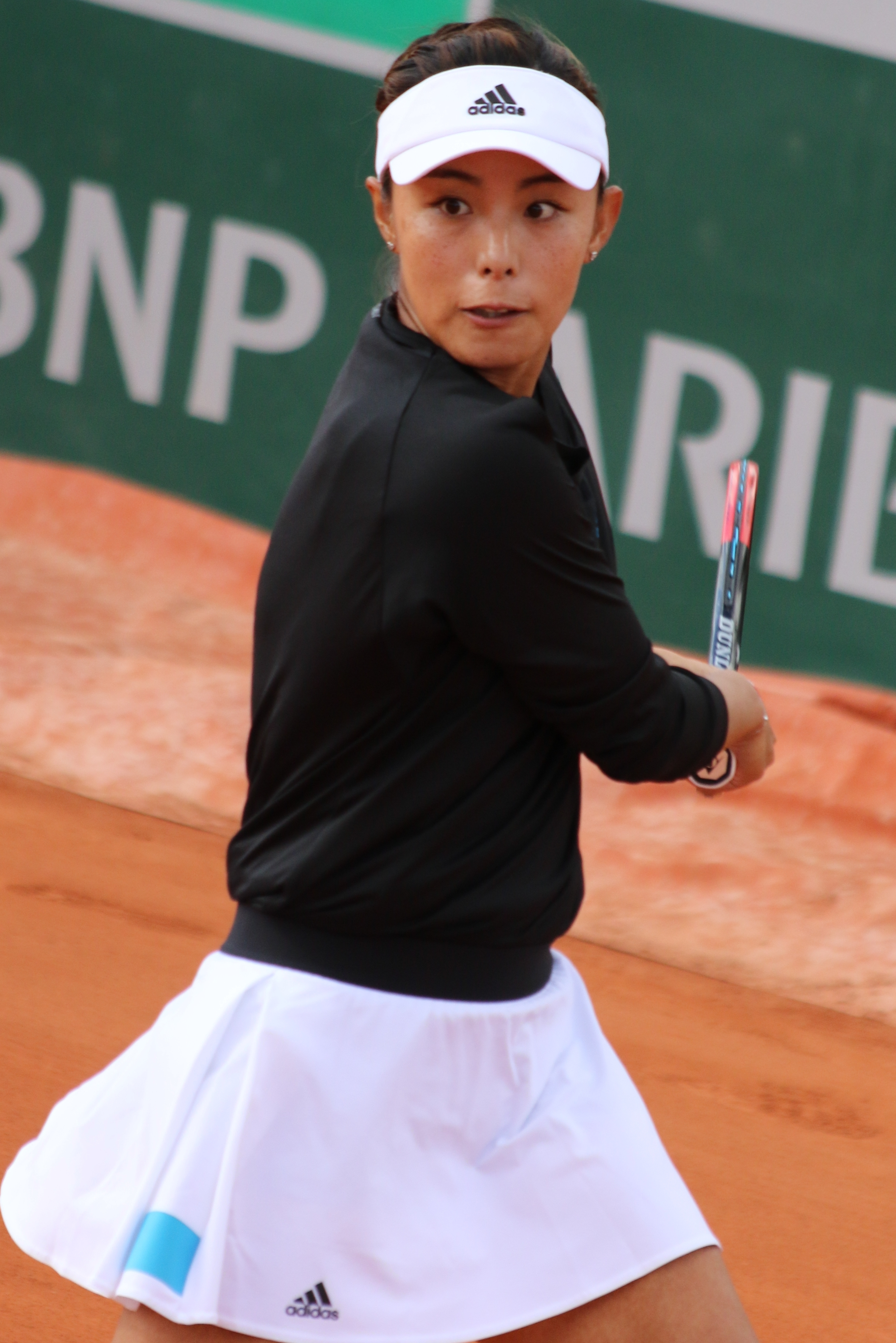
- Wang Qiang at the 2019 French Open
- Country (sports): China
- Residence: Tianjin, China
- Born: 14 January 1992 (age 34) Tianjin
- Height: 1.72 m (5 ft 8 in)
- Turned pro: 2006
- Retired: 2025
- Plays: Right (two-handed backhand)
- Coach: Peter McNamara (2015–2019); Thomas Drouet (2019–2020); Pat Cash (2021–2022)
- Prize money: US$ 5,578,040

Singles
- Career record: 450–303
- Career titles: 2 WTA, 1 WTA Challenger
- Highest ranking: No. 12 (9 September 2019)
- Current ranking: No. 613 (9 June 2025)

Grand Slam singles results
- Australian Open: 4R (2020)
- French Open: 3R (2018)
- Wimbledon: 3R (2019)
- US Open: QF (2019)

Other tournaments
- Olympic Games: 2R (2020)

Doubles
- Career record: 26–58
- Career titles: 1 ITF
- Highest ranking: No. 118 (23 July 2018)

Grand Slam doubles results
- Australian Open: 2R (2019)
- French Open: 2R (2017, 2018)
- Wimbledon: 1R (2017, 2018)
- US Open: 2R (2017)

Team competitions
- Fed Cup: 21–12
Medal record
Women's tennis
Representing China
Asian Games
Gold medal – first place	2014 Incheon	Singles
Gold medal – first place	2018 Jakarta-Palembang	Singles

Wang Qiang (Chinese: 王蔷; pinyin: Wáng Qiáng; Mandarin pronunciation: [wǎŋ tɕʰjǎŋ]; born 14 January 1992) is a Chinese former professional tennis player. On 9 September 2019, Wang achieved her highest singles ranking of world No. 12, becoming the third-highest ranked Chinese tennis player in history after Li Na and Zheng Qinwen.

She has won two singles titles on the WTA Tour, one WTA Challenger singles title, and 14 singles titles and one doubles title on the ITF Circuit. Her best performance at a major came at the 2019 US Open when she advanced to the quarterfinals. Alongside Li Na, Zheng Jie, Peng Shuai, Zhang Shuai and Zheng Qinwen, Wang is one of only six Chinese tennis players to have reached the quarterfinals of a major.

== Career ==
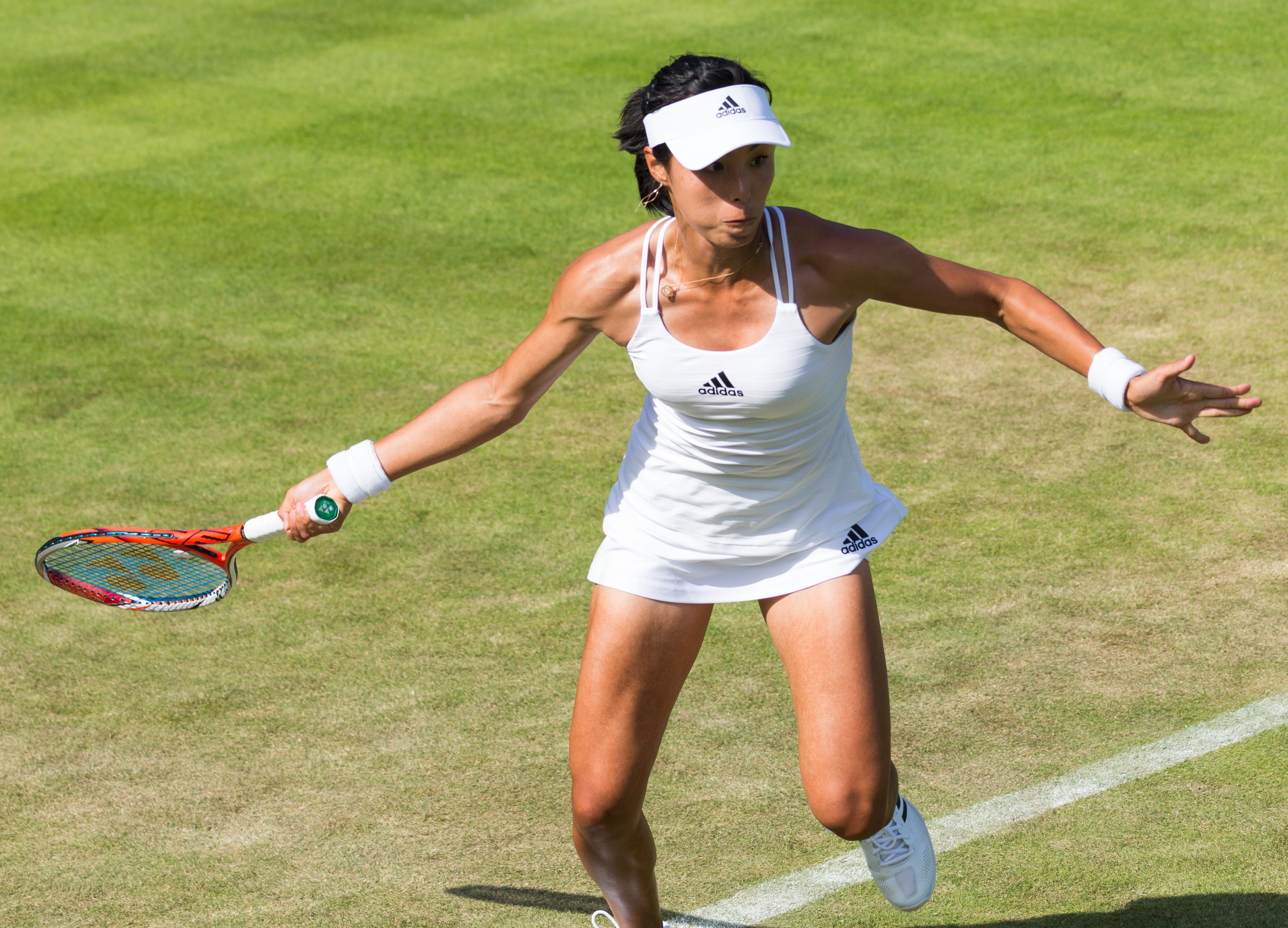
Wang at the 2015 Wimbledon Championships

Wang was born in Tianjin. At age nine, she started playing tennis. That year, she became the promotion player for the Tianjin National Tennis Center. For two years consecutively (2006, 2007), she won the Junior's Tennis Championship in China. She officially started touring the ITF Women's Circuit in Japan as of 2007.

In February 2010, she was a main-draw player at the AOAO Sports charity themed 'Fiji Tennis Invitation Classis' [FTIC] created by Ademola Oduwole on Denarau Island in Fiji aimed at promoting girls sports. She defeated Christina Visico of the Philippines in the finals to win her $2,000 purse and a $4,000 Chris Aire watch donated by the Hollywood Luxury watch designer

Wang achieved her first big WTA Tour win at the 2013 Malaysian Open where, after qualifying, she beat top seed and world No. 10, Caroline Wozniacki in the first round.

She made her major main-draw debut at the 2014 US Open from the qualifying tournament, and defeated Paula Kania from Poland in the first round 6–2, 6–0, before losing to Australian Casey Dellacqua in the second round.

In 2016, Wang's best results came at the major tournaments, reaching the second round of the Australian Open, French Open, and US Open. She also competed in singles at the 2016 Summer Olympics, but lost in the first round to two-time major champion Svetlana Kuznetsova.

In 2017, Wang reached her first quarterfinal at a Premier-level tournament, winning three straight set matches in Dubai, (a Premier 5 tournament) before losing to Anastasija Sevastova. She finished the year ranked inside the top 50 for the first time, at No. 45.

=== 2018: Asian Games gold, two WTA Tour titles, world No. 20 ===
Wang got off to a very slow start in the 2018 season, winning just one main-draw match in her first four tournaments. She then reached the fourth round in Indian Wells, defeating former top-10 players Timea Bacsinszky and Kristina Mladenovic en route, before falling to world No. 1, Simona Halep. Wang struggled in her next tournaments, and her ranking dropped to No. 91 in the world.

She then reached her first quarterfinal of the year in Strasbourg, losing to top seed Ashleigh Barty. At the French Open, Wang upset the ninth seed and seven-time Grand Slam champion Venus Williams in the first round, then defeated Petra Martić to advance to the third round of a major event for the first time. However, she was then beaten by Yulia Putintseva. The only grass-court tournament she played was in Wimbledon, where she lost in the opening round to Zheng Saisai.

Wang won the golden medal in singles at the Asian Games defeating Jeong Su-nam, Gozal Ainitdinova, Aldila Sutjiadi, Liang En-shuo, and finally compatriot Zhang Shuai in the final.

Wang also had a great run in the Asian Swing. She won her first career tile in July at Jiangxi, where she defeated Zheng Saisai in the final. After reaching the third round at the US Open, before falling to Elina Svitolina, Wang won her second title of the year (and career) in Guangzhou, where she didn't drop more than four games in each match throughout the tournament. As a result of her Guangzhou triumph, she reached a new career-high ranking of world No. 34 and replaced Zhang Shuai as the highest-ranked Chinese player.

The next week, she competed at the Premier-5 tournament in Wuhan, where she defeated Maria Sakkari, eighth seed Karolína Plíšková, and Daria Gavrilova in the first three matches. In the quarterfinals, she defeated 2016 Olympic gold medalist Monica Puig in straight sets to reach the semifinals, but was forced to retire from the match against Anett Kontaveit due to injury. She became the first ever Chinese player to reach the semifinals at the tournament, and reached another new career-high ranking of No. 28.

Wang received a wildcard into the China Open in Beijing. As a Wuhan Open semifinalist, she received a first-round bye. She defeated the 2017 French Open champion Jeļena Ostapenko in the second round by 6–0, 6–0. In the third round, she beat Karolína Plíšková for the second time in consecutive weeks in straight sets. In the quarterfinal, she defeated Wuhan champion Aryna Sabalenka in two very tight sets. Her run ended in the semifinal, at the hands of former world No. 1, Caroline Wozniacki. However, her first ever Premier Mandatory semifinal earned her a new career-high ranking of No. 24.

Wang was seeded sixth at the Hong Kong Open. She defeated Zhang Ling and Christina McHale to reach the quarterfinals, where she faced top seed Elina Svitolina. Wang took a decisive lead quickly, taking the first set 6–2 and was leading 5–2 in the second when the match was suspended for the night due to a sudden downpour. She closed out the set 6–4 the next day, advancing to the semifinals; she defeated fourth seed Garbiñe Muguruza in three sets, coming back from a 1–4 deficit in the third to win 7–5. In her third final of the year, Wang was defeated by 18-year-old Dayana Yastremska in straight sets. On 22 October, she reached a new career-high ranking of No. 22.

She was awarded a wildcard to enter the Elite Trophy, but with withdrawals from both Serena Williams and Jeļena Ostapenko, she qualified for the main draw with her ranking. In her first round-robin match, she lost to Daria Kasatkina in three sets. She then played Madison Keys, winning the match in three sets. Later, Keys, as the winner of the group, announced her withdrawal due to a knee injury, allowing the second-placed Wang to play the semifinal match against Muguruza, where she won in straight sets. In the final, she was defeated by Ashleigh Barty. Her performance in Zhuhai saw her break the top 20 for the first time, and ensured she would end the year as world No. 20.

=== 2019: First major quarterfinal, top 15 debut and career-high ranking ===
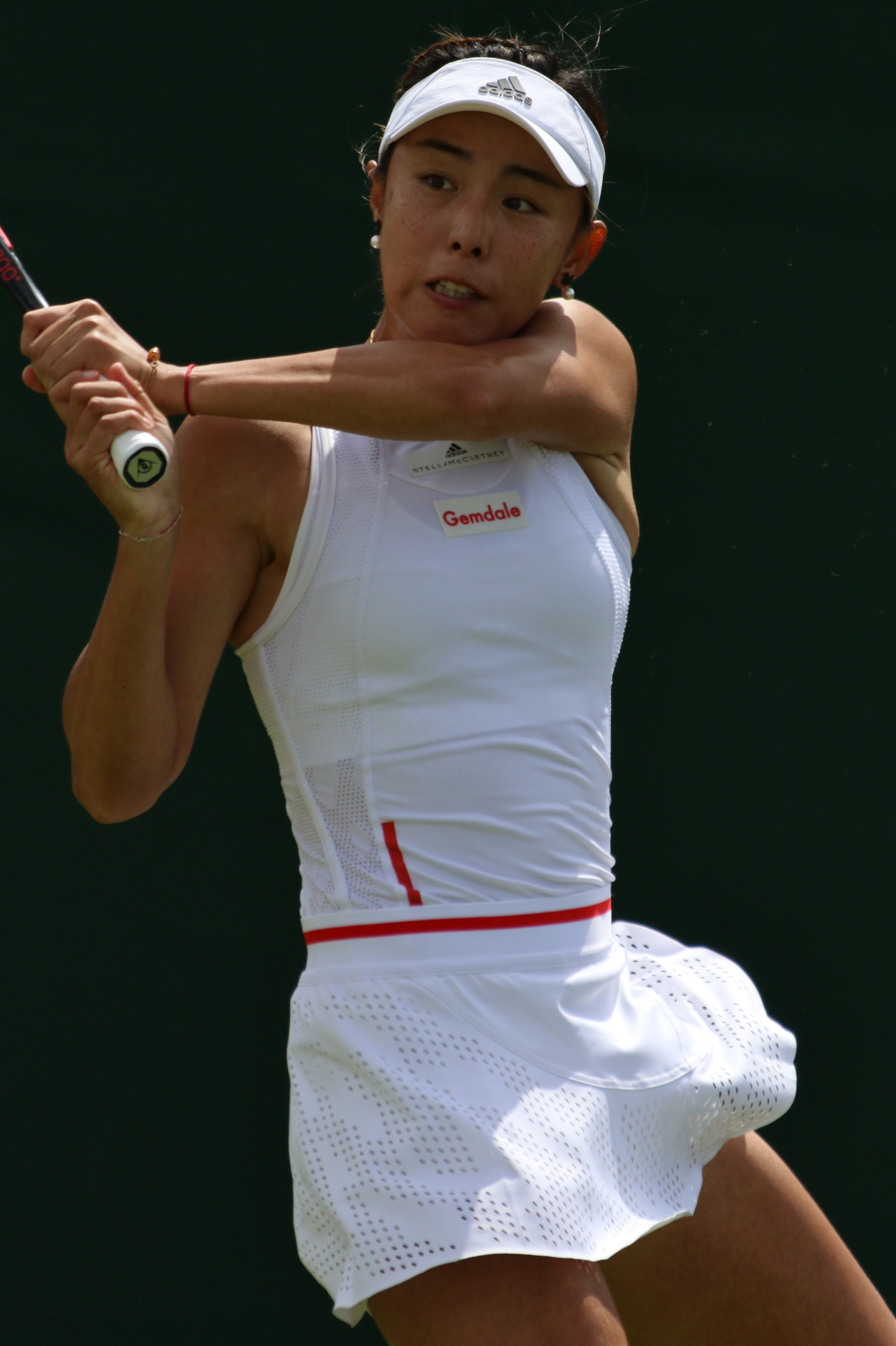
Wang at the 2019 Wimbledon Championships

Seeded 21st at the Australian Open (her first ever seeding at a Grand Slam tournament), Wang defeated Fiona Ferro and Aleksandra Krunić, and then lost to 13th seed Anastasija Sevastova. This was her best performance to date at the tournament. At Indian Wells, she defeated 16th seed Elise Mertens and reached the fourth round, losing to the Canadian wildcard (and eventual champion) Bianca Andreescu. In Miami, she reached the quarterfinals, where she lost to second seed Simona Halep. At the Prague Open, she was seeded third, reaching the quarterfinals and then lost to Bernarda Pera. Wang failed to advance past the second round at any tournament during the clay-court season, losing in the first round at Madrid and Rome, and losing in the second round at Strasbourg and the French Open.

At the Birmingham Classic, she defeated Lauren Davis and then lost to Venus Williams in the second round. Wang subsequently withdrew from the Eastbourne International. Seeded 15th at the Wimbledon Championships, she defeated Vera Lapko and Tamara Zidanšek, before losing to Elise Mertens in the third round. This was her best performance at this major tournament to date.

She achieved a series of new career-high rankings over the course of the year, achieving the world No. 15 position prior to Wimbledon.

Seeded 18th at the US Open, Wang defeated Caroline Dolehide, Alison Van Uytvanck, and Fiona Ferro to advance to the second week of a major event for the first time. She then upset tournament favorite and world No. 2, Ash Barty, in the fourth round, her first victory over a top-three player, to advance to her first Grand Slam quarterfinal. She became just the fifth Chinese player in history, after Li Na, Zheng Jie, Peng Shuai, and Zhang Shuai, to reach a Grand Slam singles quarterfinal, and the third to do so at the US Open, after Li and Peng. However, she heavily lost to eventual runner-up Serena Williams in straight sets, winning just one game. After the tournament, she rose six places to reach another new career high of world No. 12, becoming the second-highest ranked Chinese singles player in history.

Wang struggled following the US Open though, managing just two match wins on the Asian hard courts, one in Wuhan and the other in Tianjin. After failing to qualify or receive a wildcard for the Elite Trophy, she finished the year ranked No. 29, her second consecutive year inside the top 30.

=== 2020: Australian Open win over Serena Williams ===
Wang opened her new season with a quarterfinal appearance at the Shenzhen Open and a first-round loss to Angelique Kerber at Adelaide. Seeded 27th at the Australian Open, she defeated Pauline Parmentier and Fiona Ferro to reach the third round, where she pulled off a major upset by defeating eighth seed Serena Williams in three sets, avenging her lopsided loss to the American at the previous US Open. However, she was upset herself in the fourth round by the unseeded Ons Jabeur. After Melbourne, Wang played three more events, losing in the quarterfinals of the Hua Hin Championships, and the first round of both the Dubai Open and Qatar Ladies Open.

=== 2021: First clay-court final, return to top 40; then hiatus, out of top 100 ===
Wang returned to action on the WTA Tour in the Abu Dhabi Open but lost to Daria Kasatkina in the first round. This was followed by another two opening-match losses in the Gippsland Trophy and the Australian Open. Wang finally won her first match of the season against Maddison Inglis in the Phillip Island Trophy, but lost in the next round to Irina-Camelia Begu. Wang's next event was in Adelaide, where again she was able to get a round of 32 win, this time against Olivia Gadecki, before falling to Jil Teichmann in her fifth three-set loss of the season. Wang failed to get a win in the Middle East swing, losing to Jessica Pegula and Svetlana Kuznetsova, despite serving for the match against the latter. Wang played at Miami, where she managed to win a deciding set for the first time in the season, beating Aliona Bolsova, but fell in two tight sets to Markéta Vondroušová in the next round. Following this event, due to Wang defending a large number of ranking points, Wang fell to world No. 50, as the China No. 2.

Wang opened her clay-court season with a win over Anastasia Gasanova in the İstanbul Cup, however she suffered three consecutive losses after this; against Ana Konjuh in that same tournament, then Karolína Muchová in Madrid and Amanda Anisimova in Rome. However, Wang rebounded for the next event, the Emilia-Romagna Open, where she beat a top 100 player for the first time that season, defeating Misaki Doi, followed by victories over Martina di Giuseppe, Petra Martić, and Sloane Stephens to reach her first ever clay final and first final outside of China in three years. However, she ended up losing in a lopsided final, winning only four games against Coco Gauff. This tournament brought Wang back into the top 40 of the WTA rankings, and she regained the spot as the top ranked Chinese tennis player. She left the French Open with a second-round finish, again with a straight-sets loss to Coco Gauff.

At the Tokyo Olympics, she reached the second round defeating Verónica Cepede Royg. Her win over the Paraguayan bettered her debut 2016 in Rio where she suffered a first-round loss.

=== 2022: Australian Open third round ===
For the first time since the 2020 Australian Open, Wang won consecutive matches in a Grand Slam championship at the 2022 Australian Open by upsetting 18th seed Coco Gauff in the first round, and then defeating Alison Van Uytvanck. She lost to Madison Keys. Wang backed this result up with a semifinal appearance at the Abierto Zapopan, when she fell in straight sets to Marie Bouzková, then a quarterfinal appearance in the Monterrey Open, where she was also beaten in straight sets, this time by Leylah Fernandez.

At Wimbledon, she defeated 14th seed Belinda Bencic in three sets in the first round, but then lost in round two to the unseeded Heather Watson. Wang headed into the Prague Open as the second seed in the qualifying draw, getting into the main draw in straight sets. She advanced to the semifinals, before losing to seventh seed Anastasia Potapova.

=== 2023–2025: Hiatus and retirement ===
Wang did not play at any professional tournaments in 2023, returning to the court in Hua Hin in January 2024 and winning the Wuning W50 event in April that year.

Entering the 2024 Wimbledon Championships using her protected ranking, she lost in the first round to 19th seed Emma Navarro. Again using her protected ranking at the US Open, she was defeated in the first round by 16th seed Liudmila Samsonova. After the match Wang said she intended to play her last tournaments in the Asian Swing over the final months of the year, before competing in some local Chinese tournaments in 2025. Wang announced her retirement from tennis in November 2025.

== Performance timelines ==
Key
W	F	SF	QF	#R	RR	Q#	P#	DNQ	A	Z#	PO	G	S	B	NMS	NTI	P	NH

(W) winner; (F) finalist; (SF) semifinalist; (QF) quarterfinalist; (#R) rounds 4, 3, 2, 1; (RR) round-robin stage; (Q#) qualification round; (P#) preliminary round; (DNQ) did not qualify; (A) absent; (Z#) Davis/Fed Cup Zonal Group (with number indication) or (PO) play-off; (G) gold, (S) silver or (B) bronze Olympic/Paralympic medal; (NMS) not a Masters tournament; (NTI) not a Tier I tournament; (P) postponed; (NH) not held; (SR) strike rate (events won / competed); (W–L) win–loss record.
To avoid confusion and double counting, these charts are updated at the conclusion of a tournament or when the player's participation has ended.

Only main-draw results in WTA Tour, Grand Slam tournaments, Fed Cup/Billie Jean King Cup and Olympic Games are included in win–loss records.

=== Singles ===
Tournament	2011	2012	2013	2014	2015	2016	2017	2018	2019	2020	2021	2022	SR	W–L	Win %
Grand Slam tournaments
Australian Open	A	A	Q2	A	1R	2R	1R	1R	3R	4R	1R	3R	0 / 8	8–8	50%
French Open	A	A	Q1	A	1R	2R	1R	3R	2R	A	2R	1R	0 / 7	5–7	42%
Wimbledon	A	A	A	A	1R	1R	2R	1R	3R	NH	A	2R	0 / 6	4–6	40%
US Open	A	A	A	2R	2R	2R	1R	3R	QF	A	A	Q2	0 / 6	9–6	60%
Win–loss	0–0	0–0	0–0	1–1	1–4	3–4	1–4	4–4	9–4	3–1	1–2	3–3	0 / 27	26–27	49%
Year-end championships
WTA Elite Trophy (Note: WTA Tournament of Champions was held from 2009 to 2014, when WTA Elite Trophy replaced it.)	DNQ							F	DNQ	NH			0 / 1	2–2	50%
National representation
Summer Olympics	NH	A	NH			1R	NH				2R	NH	0 / 2	1–2	33%
WTA 1000
Dubai / Qatar Open (Note: The first Premier 5 event of the year has switched back and forth between the Dubai Tennis Championships and the Qatar Ladies Open since 2009. Dubai was classified as a Premier 5 event from 2009 to 2011 before being succeeded by Doha for the 2012–2014 period. In 2015, Dubai regained its Premier 5 status while Doha was demoted to Premier status. The Premier 5 tournaments were reclassified as WTA 1000 tournaments in 2021.)	A	A	A	A	2R	1R	QF	1R	A	1R	1R	A	0 / 6	4–6	40%
Indian Wells Open	A	A	A	A	A	A	2R	4R	4R	NH	A	1R	0 / 4	6–4	60%
Miami Open	A	A	A	A	A	A	2R	1R	QF	NH	2R	2R	0 / 5	5–5	50%
Madrid Open	A	A	A	A	A	A	3R	1R	1R	NH	1R	Q1	0 / 4	2–4	33%
Italian Open	A	A	A	A	A	A	2R	Q2	1R	A	1R	A	0 / 3	1–3	25%
Canadian Open	A	A	A	A	A	A	A	1R	A	NH	A	A	0 / 1	0–1	0%
Cincinnati Open	A	A	A	A	A	Q1	A	A	1R	A	A	A	0 / 1	0–1	0%
Guadalajara Open	NMS/NH											A	0 / 0	0–0	–
Pan Pacific / Wuhan Open (Note: In 2014, the Pan Pacific Open was downgraded to a Premier event and replaced by the Wuhan Open. The Premier 5 tournaments were reclassified as WTA 1000 tournaments in 2021.)	A	A	A	A	A	Q2	3R	SF	3R	NH			0 / 3	7–3	70%
China Open	A	1R	Q1	A	2R	1R	1R	SF	1R	NH			0 / 6	4–6	40%
Career statistics
	2011	2012	2013	2014	2015	2016	2017	2018	2019	2020	2021	2022			
Tournaments	0	3	1	2	14	12	19	22	19	6	14	13	Career total: 125		
Titles	0	0	0	0	0	0	0	2	0	0	0	0	Career total: 2		
Finals	0	0	0	0	0	0	0	4	0	0	1	0	Career total: 5		
Hard win–loss	0–0	0–3	1–1	1–2	4–10	7–9	18–13	32–15	14–11	7–6	4–9	12–8	2 / 88	100–87	53%
Clay win–loss	0–0	0–0	0–0	0–0	0–2	1–2	5–5	5–5	4–6	0–0	6–5	0–2	0 / 27	21–27	44%
Grass win–loss	0–0	0–0	0–0	0–0	0–2	0–1	1–1	0–1	3–2	0–0	0–0	1–3	0 / 10	5–10	33%
Overall win–loss	0–0	0–3	1–1	1–2	4–14	8–12	24–19	37–21	21–19	7–6	10–14	13–13	2 / 125	126–124	Career total: 50%
Year-end ranking (Note: 2006: WTA ranking–896, 2007: WTA ranking–778, 2008: WTA ranking–556, 2009: WTA ranking–363, 2010: WTA ranking–291.)	270	193	217	100	114	70	45	20	29	34	104	92	$5,578,040		

=== Doubles ===
Tournament	2013	2014	2015	2016	2017	2018	2019	2020	2021	2022	SR	W–L	Win %
Grand Slam tournaments
Australian Open	A	A	A	A	1R	1R	2R	A	A	A	0 / 3	1–3	25%
French Open	A	A	A	A	2R	2R	1R	A	A	A	0 / 3	2–3	40%
Wimbledon	A	A	A	A	1R	1R	A	NH	A	A	0 / 2	0–2	0%
US Open	A	A	A	1R	2R	1R	A	A	A	A	0 / 3	1–3	25%
Win–loss	0–0	0–0	0–0	0–1	2–4	1–4	1–2	0–0	0–0	0–0	0 / 11	4–11	27%
WTA 1000
Italian Open	A	A	A	A	A	A	A	A	1R	A	0 / 1	0–1	0%
Pan Pacific / Wuhan Open (Note: In 2014, the Pan Pacific Open was downgraded to a Premier event and replaced by the Wuhan Open. The Premier 5 tournaments were reclassified as WTA 1000 tournaments in 2021.)	A	A	A	A	1R	1R	A	NH			0 / 2	0–2	0%
China Open	A	A	A	A	1R	A	A	NH			0 / 1	0–1	0%
Career statistics
Tournaments	1	1	1	1	10	7	3	0	3	0	Career total: 27		
Titles	0	0	0	0	0	0	0	0	0	0	Career total: 0		
Finals	0	0	0	0	1	0	0	0	0	0	Career total: 1		
Overall win–loss	0–1	0–1	0–1	0–1	5–10	3–7	2–3	0–0	0–3	0–0	0 / 27	10–27	27%
Year-end ranking	n/a		969	1119	154	253	306	527	1666	951			

== Significant finals ==
=== WTA Elite Trophy ===
==== Singles: 1 (runner–up) ====
Result	Year	Location	Surface	Opponent	Score
Loss	2018	Elite Trophy, Zhuhai	Hard (i)	(Australia) Ashleigh Barty	3–6, 4–6

== WTA Tour finals ==
=== Singles: 5 (2 titles, 3 runner-ups) ===
Legend WTA Elite Trophy (0–1) WTA 250 (2–2)	Finals by surface Hard (2–2) Clay (0–1)

Result	W–L	Date	Tournament	Tier	Surface	Opponent	Score
Win	1–0	Jul 2018	Jiangxi International, China	International (Note: The WTA International tournaments were reclassified as WTA 250 tournaments in 2021.)	Hard	(China) Zheng Saisai	7–5, 4–0 ret.
Win	2–0	Sep 2018	Guangzhou International, China	International	Hard	(Kazakhstan) Yulia Putintseva	6–1, 6–2
Loss	2–1	Oct 2018	Hong Kong Open, China SAR	International	Hard	(Ukraine) Dayana Yastremska	2–6, 1–6
Loss	2–2	Nov 2018	Zhuhai, China	Elite Trophy	Hard (i)	(Australia) Ashleigh Barty	3–6, 4–6
Loss	2–3	May 2021	Emilia-Romagna Open, Italy	WTA 250	Clay	(United States) Coco Gauff	1–6, 3–6

=== Doubles: 1 (runner-up) ===
Legend WTA 500 WTA 250 (0–1)	Finals by surface Hard (0–1) Clay (0–0)

Result	Date	Tournament	Tier	Surface	Partner	Opponents	Score
Loss	Oct 2017	Hong Kong Open, China SAR	International	Hard	(China) Lu Jiajing	(Chinese Taipei) Chan Hao-ching (Chinese Taipei) Chan Yung-jan	1–6, 1–6

== WTA 125 finals ==
=== Singles: 2 (1 title, 1 runner-up) ===
Result	W–L	Date	Tournament	Surface	Opponent	Score
Loss	0–1	Oct 2014	Ningbo International, China	Hard	(Poland) Magda Linette	6–3, 5–7, 1–6
Win	1–1	Apr 2017	Zhengzhou Open, China	Hard	(China) Peng Shuai	3–6, 7–6^{(7–3)}, 1–1 ret.

== ITF Circuit finals ==
=== Singles: 19 (14 titles, 5 runner-ups) ===
Legend $80,000 tournaments (1–1) $60,000 tournaments (5–2) $40,000 tournaments (1–0) $25,000 tournaments (4–2) $10,000 tournaments (3–0)	Finals by surface Hard (12–5) Grass (1–0) Carpet (1–0)

Result	W–L	Date	Tournament	Tier	Surface	Opponent	Score
Win	1–0	Nov 2010	ITF Hyōgo, Japan	10,000	Carpet	(Japan) Yurina Koshino	6–1, 6–4
Loss	1–1	Jun 2011	ITF Balikpapan, Indonesia	25,000	Hard	(Thailand) Varatchaya Wongteanchai	5–7, 3–6
Win	2–1	Mar 2012	ITF Sanya, China	25,000	Hard	(China) Han Xinyun	6–2, 6–4
Win	3–1	Aug 2012	Beijing Challenger, China	75,000	Hard	(Chinese Taipei) Chan Yung-jan	6–2, 6–4
Win	4–1	Dec 2012	ITF Bangkok, Thailand	10,000	Hard	(Thailand) Nungnadda Wannasuk	6–2, 6–1
Win	5–1	Dec 2012	ITF Bangkok, Thailand	10,000	Hard	(China) Xin Wen	4–6, 6–3, 6–4
Loss	5–2	Apr 2013	ITF Wenshan, China	50,000	Hard	(China) Zhang Yuxuan	6–1, 6–7^{(4)}, 2–6
Loss	5–3	May 2013	Kangaroo Cup Gifu, Japan	50,000	Hard	(Belgium) An-Sophie Mestach	6–1, 3–6, 0–6
Win	6–3	Feb 2014	ITF New Delhi, India	25,000	Hard	(Ukraine) Yuliya Beygelzimer	6–1, 6–3
Win	7–3	May 2014	Kurume Cup, Japan	50,000	Grass	(Japan) Eri Hozumi	6–3, 6–1
Win	8–3	May 2014	ITF Tianjin, China	25,000	Hard	(China) Zhu Lin	6–3, 6–2
Win	9–3	Aug 2014	ITF Wuhan, China	50,000	Hard	(Thailand) Luksika Kumkhum	6–2, 6–2
Win	10–3	Jul 2015	ITF Bangkok, Thailand	25,000	Hard	(China) Zhang Kailin	6–2, 6–4
Loss	10–4	Jul 2015	ITF Tianjin, China	25,000	Hard	(China) Duan Yingying	6–4, 6–7^{(2)}, 0–3 ret.
Win	11–4	Mar 2016	Blossom Cup, China	50,000	Hard	(China) Liu Fangzhou	6–2, 6–2
Win	12–4	Apr 2016	Pingshan Open, China	50,000	Hard	(Japan) Mayo Hibi	6–2, 6–0
Loss	12–5	May 2016	Kangaroo Cup Gifu, Japan	75,000	Hard	(Japan) Hiroko Kuwata	2–6, 6–2, 4–6
Win	13–5	Jul 2016	ITF Wuhan, China (2)	50,000	Hard	(Thailand) Luksika Kumkhum	7–5, 6–2
Win	14–5	Apr 2024	ITF Wuning, China	W50	Hard	(Thailand) Lanlana Tararudee	1–6, 6–3, 4–3 ret.

=== Doubles: 2 (1 title, 1 runner-up) ===
Legend
$25,000 tournaments (0–1)
$10,000 tournaments (1–0)

Result	W–L	Date	Tournament	Tier	Surface	Partner	Opponents	Score
Loss	0–1	Sep 2010	ITF Makinohara, Japan	25,000	Carpet	(Chinese Taipei) Kao Shao-yuan	(China) Lu Jiajing (China) Lu Jiaxiang	5–7, 6–1, [9–11]
Win	1–1	Oct 2010	ITF Taipei, Taiwan	10,000	Hard (i)	(Chinese Taipei) Kao Shao-yuan	(Chinese Taipei) Juan Ting-fei (China) Zheng Saisai	6–3, 7–6^{(2)}

== WTA Tour career earnings ==
Current after the 2022 Abierto Zapopan

Year	Grand Slam singles titles	WTA singles titles	Total singles titles	Earnings ($)	Money list rank
2014	0	0	0	107,339	172
2015	0	0	0	260,440	115
2016	0	0	0	339,508	91
2017	0	0	0	585,021	57
2018	0	2	2	1,596,204	25
2019	0	0	0	1,316,417	30
2020	0	0	0	258,094	101
2021	0	0	0	270,376	138
2022	0	0	0	178,926	39
Career	0	2	2	5,057,505	122

== Career Grand Slam statistics ==
=== Seedings ===
The tournaments won by Wang are in boldface, and advanced into finals by Wang are in italics.

Year	Australian Open	French Open	Wimbledon	US Open
2013	did not qualify	did not qualify	did not play	did not play
2014	did not play	did not play	did not play	Qualifier
2015	not seeded	not seeded	not seeded	not seeded
2016	Qualifier	not seeded	not seeded	not seeded
2017	not seeded	not seeded	not seeded	not seeded
2018	not seeded	not seeded	not seeded	not seeded
2019	21st	16th	15th	18th
2020	27th	did not play	cancelled	did not play
2021	30th	not seeded	did not play	did not play
2022	not seeded	not seeded	not seeded	did not qualify

== Wins over top 10 players ==
Season	2013	2018	2019	2020	Total
Wins	1	4	1	1	**7**

#	Player	Rank	Event	Surface	Rd	Score	WQR
**2013**
1.	(Denmark) Caroline Wozniacki	No. 10	Malaysian Open, Malaysia	Hard	1R	2–6, 7–6^{(7–1)}, 6–1	No. 186
**2018**
2.	(United States) Venus Williams	No. 9	French Open, France	Clay	1R	6–4, 7–5	No. 91
3.	(Czech Republic) Karolína Plíšková	No. 7	Wuhan Open, China	Hard	2R	6–1, 3–6, 6–3	No. 34
4.	(Czech Republic) Karolína Plíšková	No. 7	China Open, China	Hard	3R	6–4, 6–4	No. 28
5.	(Ukraine) Elina Svitolina	No. 5	Hong Kong Open, China SAR	Hard	QF	6–2, 6–4	No. 24
**2019**
6.	(Australia) Ashleigh Barty	No. 2	US Open, United States	Hard	4R	6–2, 6–4	No. 18
**2020**
7.	(United States) Serena Williams	No. 9	Australian Open, Australia	Hard	3R	6–4, 6–7^{(2–7)}, 7–5	No. 29
