= Wuhan World Tennis Tour =

Women's World Tennis Tour
- Event name: Wuhan
- Location: Wuhan, China
- Venue: Wuhan World Tennis Tour; Wuhan City Vocational College (2017–18); Optics Valley Tennis Center (2014–16)
- Category: ITF Women's Circuit
- Surface: Hard
- Draw: 32S/32Q/16D
- Prize money: $25,000
- Website: itf.wuhanopen.org

The Wuhan World Tennis Tour is a tournament for professional female tennis players played on outdoor hard courts. The event is classified as a $25,000 ITF Women's Circuit tournament and has been held in Wuhan, China, since 2014. The tournament was previously a $50,000 tournament from 2014 to 2016.

== Past finals ==
=== Singles ===
Year	Champion	Runner-up	Score
2020	Tournament cancelled due to the COVID-19 pandemic		
2019	(China) Yuan Yue	(Japan) Akiko Omae	6–3, 7–6^{(8–6)}
2018	(China) Lu Jiajing	(China) Yuan Yue	2–6, 6–4, 6–3
2017	(Serbia) Jovana Jakšić	(China) Liu Fangzhou	6–0, 3–6, 6–2
2016	(China) Wang Qiang	(Thailand) Luksika Kumkhum	7–5, 6–2
2015	(China) Zhang Yuxuan	(China) Liu Chang	6–4, 6–0
2014	(China) Wang Qiang	(Thailand) Luksika Kumkhum	6–2, 6–2

=== Doubles ===
Year	Champions	Runners-up	Score
2020	Tournament cancelled due to the COVID-19 pandemic		
2019	(China) Jiang Xinyu (Japan) Erika Sema	(China) Guo Meiqi (China) Wu Meixu	7–6^{(7–3)}, 6–2
2018	(Japan) Mai Minokoshi (Japan) Erika Sema	(China) Guo Hanyu (China) Zhang Ying	6–4, 6–1
2017	(Australia) Alison Bai (China) Lu Jiajing	(China) Jiang Xinyu (China) Tang Qianhui	6–2, 7–6^{(7–3)}
2016	(Japan) Shuko Aoyama (Japan) Makoto Ninomiya	(Chinese Taipei) Chang Kai-chen (China) Duan Yingying	6–4, 6–4
2015	(Chinese Taipei) Chang Kai-chen (China) Han Xinyun	(China) Liu Chang (China) Lu Jiajing	6–0, 6–3
2014	(China) Han Xinyun (China) Zhang Kailin	(Japan) Miyu Kato (Japan) Makoto Ninomiya	6–4, 6–2
