= Liu Siqi =

Goddaughter of Mao Zedong (1930–2022)

- 刘思齐
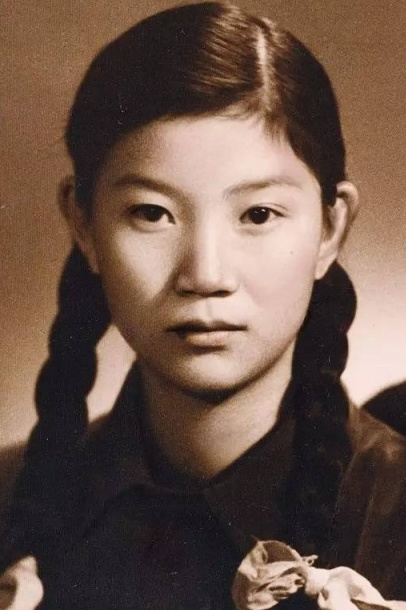
- Liu Songlin, 1949
- Born: 2 March 1930; Shanghai, Republic of China
- Died: 7 January 2022 (aged 91); Beijing, People's Republic of China
- Education: Moscow State University; Peking University
- Political party: Chinese Communist Party
- Spouses: Mao Anying (m. 1949; died 1950) Yang Maozhi (m. 1962)
- Children: 4
- Parent(s): Liu Qianchu; Zhang Wenqiu
- Relatives: Shao Hua (sister)

Chinese name
- Simplified Chinese: 刘思齐
- Traditional Chinese: 劉思齊
Transcriptions
Standard Mandarin
- Hanyu Pinyin: Liú Sīqí

Liu Songlin
- Simplified Chinese: 刘松林
- Traditional Chinese: 劉松林
Transcriptions
Standard Mandarin
- Hanyu Pinyin: Liú Sōnglín

Liu Siqi (Chinese: 刘思齐; 2 March 1930 – 7 January 2022), also known as Liu Songlin (刘松林), was the wife of Mao Anying, the first son of Mao Zedong.

== Biography ==
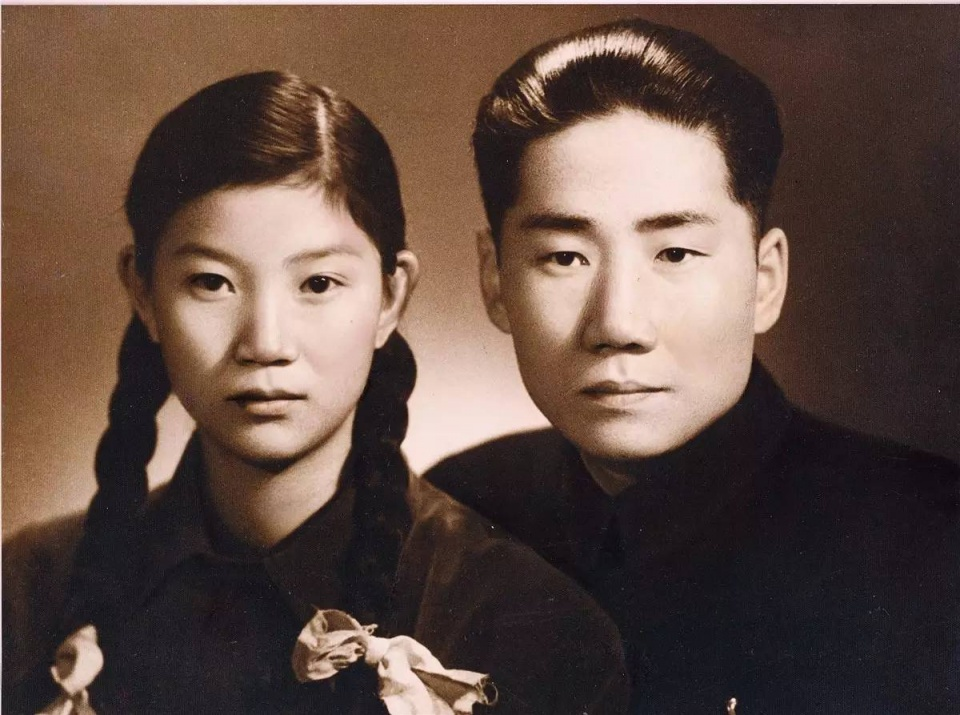
Liu Songlin and husband Mao Anying in 1949.

Liu was born in Shanghai, on 2 March 1930, to Liu Qianchu (刘谦初), a communist who was killed by the Kuomintang on 5 April 1931, and Zhang Wenqiu, a member of the Chinese Communist Party. Her name "Siqi" (思齐) means "missing Shandong" (思念齐鲁). She had two half sisters, Shao Hua and Zhang Shaolin (张少林). In 1938, she was accepted as a goddaughter by Mao Zedong in Yan'an, Shaanxi. In 1939, Liu went to the Soviet Union with her family. When they passed Xinjiang, they were detained by warlord Sheng Shicai and spent eight years in prison. In 1946, under the mediation of Zhou Enlai, she returned to Yan'an, where she met Mao Anying, the first son of Mao Zedong. In May 1948, they became lovers in Xibaipo and got married at Zhongnanhai, in Beijing, on 15 October 1949. In November 1950, Mao Anying died in an air raid by the U.S.-ROK coalition forces in the Korean War. In 1955, she pursued advanced studies at Moscow State University. In 1957, she returned to China and studied Russian language and literature at Peking University. In early 1962, she remarried to Yang Maozhi (杨茂之), a faculty member of the PLA Air Force Academy (now Air Force Command College). They had two sons and two daughters. On 7 January 2022, she died in Beijing, aged 91.
