= Luksika Kumkhum =

Thai tennis player (born 1993)

Luksika Kumkhum ลักษิกา คำขำ
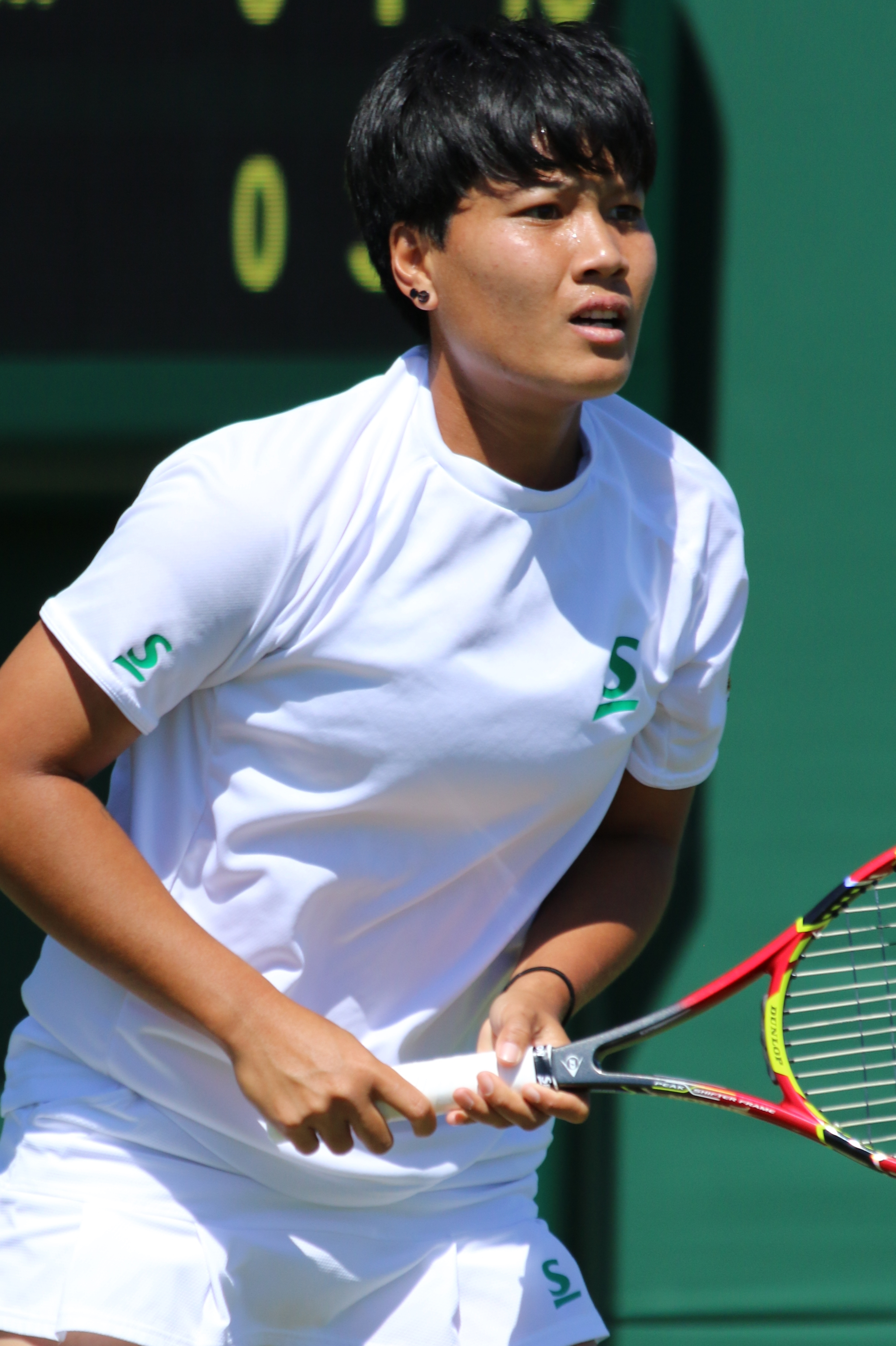
- Luksika Kumkhum at the 2018 Wimbledon Championships
- Country (sports): Thailand
- Residence: Bangkok, Thailand
- Born: 21 July 1993 (age 33) Chanthaburi, Thailand
- Height: 1.67 m (5 ft 6 in)
- Turned pro: 2011
- Plays: Right (two-handed both sides)
- Coach: Lersak Kumkhum (her father)
- Prize money: US$ 1,202,044

Singles
- Career record: 373–197
- Career titles: 2 WTA Challengers, 18 ITF
- Highest ranking: No. 66 (19 November 2018)

Grand Slam singles results
- Australian Open: 3R (2018)
- French Open: 1R (2014, 2018, 2019)
- Wimbledon: 2R (2018)
- US Open: Q2 (2014)

Doubles
- Career record: 219–138
- Career titles: 19 ITF
- Highest ranking: No. 86 (16 July 2018)

Grand Slam doubles results
- Australian Open: 1R (2019)
- Wimbledon: 2R (2018)

Team competitions
- Fed Cup: 23–10
Medal record
Tennis
Representing Thailand
Asian Games
Gold medal – first place	2014 Incheon	Doubles
Silver medal – second place	2014 Incheon	Singles
Silver medal – second place	2018 Palembang	Mixed doubles
Southeast Asian Games
Gold medal – first place	2015 Singapore	Team
Gold medal – first place	2017 Kuala Lumpur	Singles
Gold medal – first place	2021 Vietnam	Singles
Gold medal – first place	2021 Vietnam	Team
Gold medal – first place	2023 Phnom Penh	Doubles
Silver medal – second place	2017 Kuala Lumpur	Doubles
Silver medal – second place	2023 Phnom Penh	Team
Bronze medal – third place	2021 Vietnam	Mixed doubles
Bronze medal – third place	2023 Phnom Penh	Mixed doubles
- Last updated on: 10 July 2026.

Luksika "Luk" Kumkhum (Thai: ลักษิกา คำขำ; RTGS: Laksika Khamkham; born 21 July 1993) is a Thai inactive tennis player. She turned professional in 2011, and reached a career-high singles ranking of world No. 66 on 19 November 2018. On 16 July 2018, she peaked at No. 86 in the WTA doubles rankings.

== Career ==
Kumkhum qualified for the 2013 Australian Open where she defeated world No. 39 Sofia Arvidsson, before losing to Jamie Hampton in the second round.

Again as a qualifier at the 2013 Malaysian Open, she reached the quarterfinals, defeating Olivia Rogowska and Eleni Daniilidou en route before losing to fourth seed Ayumi Morita.

At the 2014 Australian Open, Kumkhum, ranked No. 87 in the world, caused a major upset when she eliminated former Wimbledon champion and sixth seed, Petra Kvitová, in the first round, in three sets. She lost to Mona Barthel in the second round in another three set match.

She reached her first WTA Tour doubles final at the 2017 Korea Open, partnering fellow Thai Peangtarn Plipuech, losing to top seeds Kirsten Flipkens and Johanna Larsson.

Having qualified for the 2018 Australian Open, Kumkhum progressed to the third round of a major tournament for the first time, defeating Johanna Larsson and Belinda Bencic. Her run was ended by Petra Martić.

At the 2018 Wimbledon Championships, she won her first match at the grass-court major by overcoming Bernarda Pera to set up a second round meeting with 10th seed Madison Keys which she lost in straight sets.

Kumkhum won her first WTA 125 title at the 2018 Mumbai Open, defeating Irina Khromacheva in the final. Two weeks later she clinched her second WTA 125 trophy by overcoming Sabine Lisicki in the final of the 2018 Tapei Open. As a result, she moved to a career-high in the WTA rankings, at world No. 66.

Six years after her first WTA Tour doubles final at the same tournament, she reached the final of the 2023 Korea Open with Peangtarn Plipuech, but they lost to Marie Bouzková and Bethanie Mattek-Sands.

== Grand Slam singles performance timeline ==
Key
W	F	SF	QF	#R	RR	Q#	DNQ	A	NH

(W) winner; (F) finalist; (SF) semifinalist; (QF) quarterfinalist; (#R) rounds 4, 3, 2, 1; (RR) round-robin stage; (Q#) qualification round; (DNQ) did not qualify; (A) absent; (NH) not held; (SR) strike rate (events won / competed); (W–L) win–loss record.
To avoid confusion and double counting, these charts are updated at the conclusion of a tournament or when the player's participation has ended.

Tournament	2013	2014	2015	2016	2017	2018	2019	SR	W–L
Australian Open	2R	2R	Q1	1R	1R	3R	1R	0 / 6	4–6
French Open	Q2	1R	A	Q1	A	1R	1R	0 / 3	0–3
Wimbledon	Q1	Q2	Q3	1R	Q2	2R	1R	0 / 3	1–3
US Open	Q1	Q2	Q1	Q1	A	A	A	0 / 0	0–0
Win–loss	1–1	1–2	0–0	0–2	0–1	3–3	0–3	0 / 12	5–12

== WTA Tour finals ==
=== Doubles: 2 (2 runner-ups) ===
Legend WTA 250 (0–2)	Finals by surface Hard (0–2)

Result	W–L	Date	Tournament	Tier	Surface	Partner	Opponents	Score
Loss	0–1	Sep 2017	Korea Open, South Korea	International	Hard	(Thailand) Peangtarn Plipuech	(Netherlands) Kiki Bertens (Sweden) Johanna Larsson	1–6, 4–6
Loss	0–2	Sep 2023	Korea Open, South Korea	WTA 250	Hard	(Thailand) Peangtarn Plipuech	(Czech Republic) Marie Bouzková (United States) Bethanie Mattek-Sands	2–6, 1–6

== WTA 125 finals ==
=== Singles: 2 (2 titles) ===
Result	W–L	Date	Tournament	Surface	Opponent	Score
Win	1–0	Nov 2018	Mumbai Open, India	Hard	(Russia) Irina Khromacheva	1–6, 6–2, 6–3
Win	2–0	Nov 2018	Taipei Open, Taiwan	Carpet (i)	(Germany) Sabine Lisicki	6–1, 6–3

== ITF Circuit finals ==
=== Singles: 28 (18 titles, 10 runner-ups) ===
Legend $75,000 tournaments $50,000 tournaments $25,000 tournaments $10/15,000 tournaments	Finals by surface Hard (17–9) Carpet (1–1)

Result	W–L	Date	Tournament	Tier	Surface	Opponent	Score
Win	1–0	Oct 2010	ITF Pattaya, Thailand	10,000	Hard	(Norway) Emma Flood	6–4, 6–3
Loss	1–1	Oct 2010	ITF Khon Kaen, Thailand	10,000	Hard	(China) Zhu Lin	3–6, 2–6
Loss	1–2	Nov 2010	ITF Manila, Philippines	10,000	Hard	(Finland) Piia Suomalainen	3–6, 3–6
Loss	1–3	Dec 2010	ITF Mandya, India	10,000	Hard	(Ukraine) Anastasiya Vasylyeva	2–6, 6–3, 2–6
Win	2–3	May 2011	ITF Bangkok, Thailand	10,000	Hard	(Indonesia) Ayu Fani Damayanti	6–2, 6–2
Win	3–3	May 2011	ITF Bangkok, Thailand	10,000	Hard	(Thailand) Peangtarn Plipuech	6–1, 6–0
Loss	3–4	Jun 2011	ITF Bangkok, Thailand	25,000	Hard	(Russia) Marta Sirotkina	4–6, 3–6
Win	4–4	Jun 2011	ITF Pattaya, Thailand	10,000	Hard	(China) Liang Chen	6–3, 6–4
Loss	4–5	Jul 2011	ITF Pattaya, Thailand	10,000	Hard	(China) Liang Chen	6–2, 6–7^{(6)}, 5–7
Win	5–5	Nov 2011	ITF Kuching, Malaysia	10,000	Hard	(Thailand) Nungnadda Wannasuk	7–6^{(3)}, 6–3
Win	6–5	Nov 2011	ITF Manila, Philippines	10,000	Hard	(China) Zhao Yijing	4–6, 6–4, 6–2
Win	7–5	Jul 2012	ITF Pattaya, Thailand	10,000	Hard	(Thailand) Nungnadda Wannasuk	6–2, 6–2
Win	8–5	Jul 2012	ITF Astana, Kazakhstan	25,000	Hard	(Thailand) Nudnida Luangnam	3–6, 6–3, 6–3
Win	9–5	Apr 2013	ITF Phuket, Thailand	25,000	Hard	(United Kingdom) Lisa Whybourn	6–0, 7–5
Win	10–5	Nov 2013	Toyota World Challenge, Japan	75,000	Carpet (i)	(Japan) Hiroko Kuwata	3–6, 6–1, 6–3
Loss	10–6	Aug 2014	ITF Wuhan, China	50,000	Hard	(China) Wang Qiang	2–6, 2–6
Win	11–6	May 2015	ITF Xuzhou, China	50,000	Hard	(Chinese Taipei) Chang Kai-chen	1–6, 7–5, 6–1
Loss	11–7	Nov 2015	Toyota World Challenge, Japan	75,000	Carpet (i)	(Croatia) Jana Fett	4–6, 6–4, 4–6
Loss	11–8	Jul 2016	ITF Wuhan, China	50,000	Hard	(China) Wang Qiang	5–7, 2–6
Loss	11–9	May 2017	Incheon Open, Korea	25,000	Hard	(South Korea) Han Na-lae	6–7^{(2)}, 5–7
Win	12–9	Jul 2017	ITF Hua Hin, Thailand	25,000	Hard	(Russia) Alisa Kleybanova	7–5, 6–7^{(4)}, 6–3
Win	13–9	Aug 2017	ITF Nonthaburi, Thailand	25,000	Hard	(China) Yuan Yue	7–5, 6–2
Win	14–9	Apr 2018	Kōfu International Open, Japan	25,000	Hard	(Canada) Bianca Andreescu	6–3, 6–3
Win	15–9	Apr 2018	ITF Kashiwa, Japan	25,000	Hard	(Canada) Bianca Andreescu	6–3, 7–6^{(4)}
Win	16–9	Oct 2021	ITF Monastir, Tunisia	W15	Hard	(India) Jennifer Luikham	6–2, 6–2
Loss	16–10	Apr 2022	ITF Chiang Rai, Thailand	W25	Hard	(Philippines) Alex Eala	4–6, 2–6
Win	17–10	Apr 2022	ITF Chiang Rai, Thailand	W25	Hard	(Thailand) Peangtarn Plipuech	6–3, 6–3
Win	18–10	Apr 2022	ITF Chiang Rai, Thailand	W15	Hard	(Australia) Talia Gibson	6–0, 6–1

=== Doubles: 33 (19 titles, 14 runner-ups) ===
Legend $100,000 tournaments $75,000 tournaments $50/60,000 tournaments $25,000 tournaments $10/15,000 tournaments	Finals by surface Hard (18–13) Grass (1–0) Carpet (0–1)

Result	W–L	Date	Tournament	Tier	Surface	Partner	Opponents	Score
Win	1–0	Oct 2010	ITF Khon Kaen, Thailand	10,000	Hard	(Thailand) Varatchaya Wongteanchai	(Vietnam) Huỳnh Phương Đài Trang (Japan) Maya Kato	6–4, 7–5
Win	2–0	Nov 2010	ITF Manila, Philippines	10,000	Hard	(Thailand) Peangtarn Plipuech	(United States) Ivana King (United States) Yasmin Schnack	6–4, 7–5
Win	3–0	Dec 2010	ITF Bangalore, India	25,000	Hard	(Thailand) Nungnadda Wannasuk	(Chinese Taipei) Chen Yi (Japan) Kumiko Iijima	7–6^{(7)}, 5–7, [10–8]
Loss	3–1	Jun 2011	ITF Pattaya, Thailand	10,000	Hard	(Thailand) Napatsakorn Sankaew	(China) Liang Chen (China) Zhao Yijing	6–1, 1–6, 5–7
Win	4–1	Nov 2011	ITF Kuching, Malaysia	10,000	Hard	(Thailand) Nungnadda Wannasuk	(China) Lu Jiaxiang (China) Lu Jiajing	6–4, 6–3
Win	5–1	Nov 2011	ITF Manila, Philippines	10,000	Hard	(Thailand) Peangtarn Plipuech	(China) Zhao Yijing (China) Zheng Junyi	6–3, 6–0
Loss	5–2	Nov 2011	ITF Manila, Philippines	10,000	Hard	(Thailand) Peangtarn Plipuech	(Thailand) Napatsakorn Sankaew (Thailand) Varunya Wongteanchai	1–6, 6–3, [6–10]
Win	6–2	Jul 2012	ITF Astana, Kazakhstan	25,000	Hard	(Thailand) Varatchaya Wongteanchai	(Ukraine) Veronika Kapshay (Russia) Ekaterina Yashina	6–2, 6–4
Win	7–2	Sep 2012	ITF Tsukuba, Japan	25,000	Hard	(Thailand) Varatchaya Wongteanchai	(Japan) Yurina Koshino (Japan) Mari Tanaka	6–2, 6–2
Win	8–2	May 2013	Kangaroo Cup, Japan	50,000	Hard	(Japan) Erika Sema	(Japan) Nao Hibino (Japan) Riko Sawayanagi	6–4, 6–3
Loss	8–3	Nov 2013	ITF Taipei, Taiwan	50,000	Hard	(Chinese Taipei) Chen Yi	(Netherlands) Lesley Kerkhove (Netherlands) Arantxa Rus	4–6, 6–2, [12–14]
Loss	8–4	Jul 2014	ITF Bangkok, Thailand	10,000	Hard	(Thailand) Tamarine Tanasugarn	(Thailand) Varatchaya Wongteanchai (Thailand) Varunya Wongteanchai	3–6, 6–4, [8–10]
Loss	8–5	Nov 2015	Toyota World Challenge, Japan	75,000	Carpet (i)	(Japan) Yuuki Tanaka	(Japan) Akiko Omae (Thailand) Peangtarn Plipuech	6–3, 0–6, [9–11]
Win	9–5	Apr 2017	Kōfu International Open, Japan	25,000	Hard	(South Korea) Han Na-lae	(Japan) Erina Hayashi (Japan) Robu Kajitani	6–3, 6–0
Win	10–5	Jul 2017	ITF Hua Hin, Thailand	25,000	Hard	(Kyrgyzstan) Ksenia Palkina	(Australia) Naiktha Bains (Switzerland) Karin Kennel	6–3, 2–6, [14–12]
Win	11–5	Mar 2018	Kōfu International Open, Japan	25,000	Hard	(China) Gao Xinyu	(Japan) Erina Hayashi (Japan) Momoko Kobori	6–0, 2–6, [10–4]
Win	12–5	Jun 2018	Manchester Trophy, UK	100,000	Grass	(India) Prarthana Thombare	(United Kingdom) Naomi Broady (United States) Asia Muhammad	7–6^{(5)}, 6–3
Loss	12–6	Oct 2018	Suzhou Ladies Open, China	100,000	Hard	(Thailand) Peangtarn Plipuech	(Japan) Misaki Doi (Japan) Nao Hibino	2–6, 3–6
Loss	12–7	Nov 2018	Shenzhen Longhua Open, China	100,000	Hard	(South Korea) Choi Ji-hee	(Japan) Shuko Aoyama (China) Yang Zhaoxuan	2–6, 3–6
Win	13–7	Oct 2021	ITF Monastir, Tunisia	W15	Hard	(Japan) Natsuho Arakawa	(Japan) Mana Ayukawa (Austria) Tamira Paszek	6–4, 6–2
Loss	13–8	Apr 2022	ITF Monastir, Tunisia	W15	Hard	(Serbia) Nikol Paleček	(China) Ni Ma Zhuoma (China) Yao Xinxin	1–6, 6–4, [2–10]
Loss	13–9	Apr 2022	ITF Chiang Rai, Thailand	W25	Hard	(Japan) Momoko Kobori	(Kazakhstan) Gozal Ainitdinova (Russia) Maria Timofeeva	6–2, 5–7, [4–10]
Win	14–9	Jun 2022	ITF Chiang Rai, Thailand	W25	Hard	(Japan) Momoko Kobori	(Japan) Misaki Matsuda (Japan) Naho Sato	6–3, 6–3
Win	15–9	Sep 2022	ITF Darwin, Australia	W25	Hard	(Japan) Momoko Kobori	(Japan) Yui Chikaraishi (Japan) Nanari Katsumi	6–2, 7–6^{(3)}
Loss	15–10	Dec 2022	Indoor Championships, Japan	W60	Hard (i)	(Japan) Momoko Kobori	(Chinese Taipei) Liang En-shuo (Chinese Taipei) Wu Fang-hsien	6–2, 6–7^{(5)}, [2–10]
Loss	15–11	Mar 2023	ITF Jakarta, Indonesia	W25	Hard	(Thailand) Peangtarn Plipuech	(China) Ma Yexin (Japan) Moyuka Uchijima	0–6, 2–6
Win	16–11	May 2023	ITF Goyang, South Korea	W25	Hard	(Thailand) Punnin Kovapitukted	(China) Guo Hanyu (China) Tang Qianhui	6–3, 1–6, [10–6]
Win	17–11	Jun 2023	ITF Tokyo, Japan	W25	Hard	(Japan) Kanako Morisaki	(Australia) Talia Gibson (Japan) Natsumi Kawaguchi	1–6, 6–2, [10–3]
Win	18–11	Sep 2023	ITF Nakhon Si Thammarat, Thailand	W25	Hard	(South Korea) Park So-hyun	(India) Vaidehi Chaudhari (India) Zeel Desai	7–6^{(4)}, 6–0
Win	19–11	Nov 2023	Takasaki Open, Japan	W100	Hard	(Thailand) Peangtarn Plipuech	(Chinese Taipei) Liang En-shuo (Chinese Taipei) Wu Fang-hsien	6–3, 6–1
Loss	19–12	Mar 2024	Branik Maribor Open, Slovenia	W75	Hard (i)	(Thailand) Peangtarn Plipuech	(United Kingdom) Eden Silva; Anastasia Tikhonova	5–7, 3–6
Loss	19–13	May 2024	Jin'an Open, China	W75	Hard	(Thailand) Peangtarn Plipuech	(China) Tang Qianhui (China) Zheng Wushuang	1–6, 2–6
Loss	19–14	May 2024	ITF Goyang, South Korea	W50	Hard	(Thailand) Peangtarn Plipuech	(Hong Kong) Eudice Chong (Chinese Taipei) Liang En-shuo	5–7, 4–6

== Top 10 wins ==
Season	2014	Total
Wins	1	1

#	Player	Rank	Event	Surface	Round	Score	LKR
2014
1.	(Czech Republic) Petra Kvitová	No. 6	Australian Open	Hard	1R	6–2, 1–6, 6–4	No. 88
