= 2013 Family Circle Cup – Doubles =

Doubles
- 2013 Family Circle Cup

Final
- Champions: (France) Kristina Mladenovic (Czech Republic) Lucie Šafářová
- Runners-up: (Czech Republic) Andrea Hlaváčková (United States) Liezel Huber
- Score: 6–3, 7–6^{(8–6)}

Details
- Draw: 16
- Seeds: 4

Events
| Singles | Doubles |
| ← 2012 · | Family Circle Cup | · 2014 → |

Anastasia Pavlyuchenkova and Lucie Šafářová were the defending champions, but Pavlyuchenkova chose not to participate this year.
Šafářová played alongside Kristina Mladenovic and successfully defended the title, defeating Andrea Hlaváčková and Liezel Huber in the final 6–3, 7–6^{(8–6)}.

== Seeds ==
1. (Czech Republic) Andrea Hlaváčková / (United States) Liezel Huber (final)
2. (United States) Raquel Kops-Jones / (United States) Abigail Spears (quarterfinals)
3. (United States) Vania King / (United States) Lisa Raymond (quarterfinals)
4. (Germany) Julia Görges / (Kazakhstan) Yaroslava Shvedova (quarterfinals)

== Draw ==
=== Key ===
- Q = Qualifier
- WC = Wild card
- LL = Lucky loser
- Alt = Alternate
- SE = Special exempt
- PR = Protected ranking
- ITF = ITF entry
- JE = Junior exempt
- w/o = Walkover
- r = Retired
- d = Defaulted
- SR = Special ranking

=== Draw ===
First round
1 | (Czech Republic) A Hlaváčková (United States) L Huber | 6 | 6
Alt | (New Zealand) M Erakovic (United States) J Pegula | 0 | 4
(Chinese Taipei) H-c Chan (Belarus) O Govortsova | 6 | 6
(Latvia) L Dekmeijere (Germany) T Malek | 2 | 2
4 | (Germany) J Görges (Kazakhstan) Y Shvedova | 3 | 7^{8} | [12]
(Germany) A-L Grönefeld (Slovakia) J Husárová | 6 | 6^{6} | [10]
(United States) M Moulton-Levy (China) S Zhang | 6 | 6
WC | (Bulgaria) J Alawi (Czech Republic) D Kaňáková | 4 | 2
(France) K Mladenovic (Czech Republic) L Šafářová | 6 | 6
WC | (Serbia) J Janković (Germany) A Petkovic | 4 | 2
(United States) V Lepchenko (Luxembourg) M Minella | 1 | 2
3 | (United States) V King (United States) L Raymond | 6 | 6
(Australia) A Barty (Australia) A Rodionova | 6 | 6
(South Africa) N Grandin (Czech Republic) V Uhlířová | 2 | 2
(Croatia) D Jurak (Hungary) K Marosi | 1 | 2
2 | (United States) R Kops-Jones (United States) A Spears | 6 | 6

Quarterfinals
1 | (Czech Republic) A Hlaváčková (United States) L Huber | 6 | 6
(Chinese Taipei) H-c Chan (Belarus) O Govortsova | 3 | 3
4 | (Germany) J Görges (Kazakhstan) Y Shvedova | 7 | 3 | [5]
(United States) M Moulton-Levy (China) S Zhang | 5 | 6 | [10]
(France) K Mladenovic (Czech Republic) L Šafářová | 7^{7} | 6
3 | (United States) V King (United States) L Raymond | 6^{5} | 1
(Australia) A Barty (Australia) A Rodionova | 6 | 3 | [10]
2 | (United States) R Kops-Jones (United States) A Spears | 4 | 6 | [6]

Semifinals
1 | (Czech Republic) A Hlaváčková (United States) L Huber | 6 | 6
(United States) M Moulton-Levy (China) S Zhang | 0 | 2
(France) K Mladenovic (Czech Republic) L Šafářová | 6 | 6
(Australia) A Barty (Australia) A Rodionova | 1 | 4

Final
1 | (Czech Republic) A Hlaváčková (United States) L Huber | 3 | 6^{6}
(France) K Mladenovic (Czech Republic) L Šafářová | 6 | 7^{8}
