= 2013 Guangzhou International Women's Open – Doubles =

Doubles
- 2013 Guangzhou International Women's Open

Final
- Champions: (Chinese Taipei) Hsieh Su-wei (China) Peng Shuai
- Runners-up: (United States) Vania King (Kazakhstan) Galina Voskoboeva
- Score: 6–3, 4–6, [12–10]

Events
Singles	Doubles
← 2012 ·	Guangzhou International Women's Open	· 2014 →

Tamarine Tanasugarn and Zhang Shuai were the defending champions, but Tanasugarn chose not to participate. Zhang played alongside Yaroslava Shvedova, but lost in the first round to Tímea Babos and Olga Govortsova. First seeded Hsieh Su-wei and Peng Shuai won the title, defeating in the final 3rd seeded Vania King and Galina Voskoboeva with the score 6–3, 4–6, [12–10].

== Seeds ==
1. (Chinese Taipei) Hsieh Su-wei / (China) Peng Shuai (champions)
2. (United States) Varvara Lepchenko / (China) Zheng Saisai (semifinals)
3. (United States) Vania King / (Kazakhstan) Galina Voskoboeva (final)
4. (Hungary) Tímea Babos / (Belarus) Olga Govortsova (quarterfinals)

== Draw ==
=== Key ===
- Q = Qualifier
- WC = Wild card
- LL = Lucky loser
- Alt = Alternate
- ITF = ITF entry
- PR = Protected ranking
- SR = Special ranking
- SE = Special exempt
- JE = Junior exempt
- JR = Junior Accelerator Programme entrant
- CO = College Accelerator Programme entrant
- NG = Next Gen Accelerator Program entrant
- w/o = Walkover
- r = Retired
- d = Defaulted

=== Draw ===
First round
1	(Chinese Taipei) S-w Hsieh (China) S Peng	6	6
(Bolivia) MF Álvarez Terán (United States) K Wong	3	3
(Ukraine) I Buryachok (Czech Republic) K Plíšková	6	6
(Georgia (country)) O Kalashnikova (Israel) S Pe'er	2	2
4	(Hungary) T Babos (Belarus) O Govortsova	6	6
(Kazakhstan) Y Shvedova (China) S Zhang	3	3
(Chinese Taipei) H-c Chan (Chinese Taipei) Y-j Chan	6	6
(Ukraine) L Kichenok (Ukraine) N Kichenok	2	3
(Israel) J Glushko (Russia) A Rodionova	6	6
(Chinese Taipei) S-y Hsieh (Argentina) P Ormaechea	0	4
WC	(China) H Tang (China) Z Yang	4	3
3	(United States) V King (Kazakhstan) G Voskoboeva	6	6
(Serbia) V Dolonc (Croatia) D Jurak	6	6
WC	(China) C Liu (China) R Tian	4	2
(France) M Johansson (Sweden) J Larsson	6^{5}	6^{10}
2	(United States) V Lepchenko (China) S Zheng	7^{7}	7^{12}

Quarterfinals
1	(Chinese Taipei) S-w Hsieh (China) S Peng	6	6
(Ukraine) I Buryachok (Czech Republic) K Plíšková	4	1
4	(Hungary) T Babos (Belarus) O Govortsova	6	4	[8]
(Chinese Taipei) H-c Chan (Chinese Taipei) Y-j Chan	4	6	[10]
(Israel) J Glushko (Russia) A Rodionova	4	0
3	(United States) V King (Kazakhstan) G Voskoboeva	6	6
(Serbia) V Dolonc (Croatia) D Jurak	4	3
2	(United States) V Lepchenko (China) S Zheng	6	6

Semifinals
1	(Chinese Taipei) S-w Hsieh (China) S Peng	7^{7}	6
(Chinese Taipei) H-c Chan (Chinese Taipei) Y-j Chan	6^{1}	3
3	(United States) V King (Kazakhstan) G Voskoboeva	7^{7}	6
2	(United States) V Lepchenko (China) S Zheng	6^{1}	3

Final
1	(Chinese Taipei) S-w Hsieh (China) S Peng	6	4	[12]
3	(United States) V King (Kazakhstan) G Voskoboeva	3	6	[10]
