= 2014 Guangzhou International Women's Open – Singles =

Singles
- 2014 Guangzhou International Women's Open

Final
- Champion: (Romania) Monica Niculescu
- Runner-up: (France) Alizé Cornet
- Score: 6–4, 6–0

Details
- Draw: 32
- Seeds: 8

Events
Singles	Doubles
- Guangzhou International Women's Open

Zhang Shuai was defending champion, but withdrew with a right arm injury before the tournament.

Monica Niculescu won the title, defeating Alizé Cornet in the final 6–4, 6–0.

== Seeds ==
1. (Australia) Samantha Stosur (first round)
2. (France) Alizé Cornet (final)
3. (United States) Sloane Stephens (first round)
4. (Serbia) Bojana Jovanovski (first round)
5. (Kazakhstan) Zarina Diyas (first round)
6. (Italy) Roberta Vinci (first round)
7. (Slovakia) Jana Čepelová (first round)
8. (Germany) Annika Beck (first round)

== Draw ==
Key

- Q = Qualifier
- WC = Wild card
- LL = Lucky loser
- Alt = Alternate
- ITF = ITF entry
- PR = Protected ranking
- SR = Special ranking
- SE = Special exempt
- JE = Junior exempt
- JR = Junior Accelerator Programme entrant
- CO = College Accelerator Programme entrant
- NG = Next Gen Accelerator Program entrant
- w/o = Walkover
- r = Retired
- d = Defaulted

=== Finals ===
Semifinals
WC	(China) Wang Yafan	0	2
(Romania) Monica Niculescu	6	6
(Switzerland) Timea Bacsinszky	1	6^{5}
2	(France) Alizé Cornet	6	7^{7}

Final
(Romania) Monica Niculescu	6	6
2	(France) Alizé Cornet	4	0

=== Top half ===
First round
1	(Australia) S Stosur	6	2	2
WC	(China) Y Wang	2	6	6
(Romania) S Cîrstea	6^{3}	1
Q	(Croatia) P Martić	7^{7}	6
(United States) A Riske	6	7^{7}
(Sweden) J Larsson	4	6^{5}
Q	(China) K Zhang	6	6
7	(Slovakia) J Čepelová	1	4
4	(Serbia) B Jovanovski	2	2
(Romania) M Niculescu	6	6
(Poland) K Piter	7	4	3
(Japan) M Doi	5	6	6
(Puerto Rico) M Puig	6	4	6
(Italy) K Knapp	1	6	2
Q	(Hong Kong) L Zhang	6	6
5	(Kazakhstan) Z Diyas	4	1

Second round
WC	(China) Y Wang	7^{7}	6
Q	(Croatia) P Martić	6^{5}	3
(United States) A Riske	2	5
Q	(China) K Zhang	6	7
(Romania) M Niculescu	6	6
(Japan) M Doi	2	1
(Puerto Rico) M Puig	6	6
Q	(Hong Kong) L Zhang	4	4

Quarterfinals
WC	(China) Y Wang	3	6	6
Q	(China) K Zhang	6	2	2
(Romania) M Niculescu	6	6
(Puerto Rico) M Puig	2	2

Semifinals
WC	(China) Y Wang	0	2
(Romania) M Niculescu	6	6

=== Bottom half ===
First round
8	(Germany) A Beck	4	6^{5}
(Spain) MT Torró Flor	6	7^{7}
Q	(China) Y Xu	6	6
(Austria) P Mayr-Achleitner	2	3
(Switzerland) T Bacsinszky	6	4	6
Q	(Poland) M Linette	2	6	4
(Spain) S Soler Espinosa	6	4	6
3	(United States) S Stephens	3	6	4
6	(Italy) R Vinci	3	6^{7}
WC	(China) L Zhu	6	7^{9}
(Belgium) A Van Uytvanck	6^{2}	6	4
WC	(Chinese Taipei) S-w Hsieh	7^{7}	2	6
(Israel) S Pe'er	7^{10}	6
(France) P Parmentier	6^{8}	3
Q	(Kazakhstan) Y Putintseva	1	1
2	(France) A Cornet	6	6

Second round
(Spain) MT Torró Flor	6^{5}	7	6
Q	(China) Y Xu	7^{7}	5	2
(Switzerland) T Bacsinszky	6	6
(Spain) S Soler Espinosa	2	2
WC	(China) L Zhu	4	2
WC	(Chinese Taipei) S-w Hsieh	6	6
(Israel) S Pe'er	6	5	1
2	(France) A Cornet	3	7	6

Quarterfinals
(Spain) MT Torró Flor	2	3
(Switzerland) T Bacsinszky	6	6
WC	(Chinese Taipei) S-w Hsieh	6^{5}	1
2	(France) A Cornet	7^{7}	6

Semifinals
(Switzerland) T Bacsinszky	1	6^{5}
2	(France) A Cornet	6	7^{7}

== Qualifying ==
=== Seeds ===
1. (Poland) Katarzyna Piter (moved to main draw)
2. (Kazakhstan) Yulia Putintseva (qualified)
3. (Israel) Shahar Pe'er (moved to main draw)
4. (Poland) Magda Linette (qualified)
5. (Russia) Ekaterina Bychkova (qualifying competition, retired)
6. (Georgia (country)) Sofia Shapatava (qualifying competition)
7. (Bulgaria) Elitsa Kostova (first round)
8. (Croatia) Petra Martić (qualified)
9. (Hong Kong) Zhang Ling (qualified)
10. (China) Xu Yifan (qualified)
11. (China) Zhang Kailin (qualified)
12. (China) Yang Zhaoxuan (qualifying competition)

=== Qualifiers ===
1. (China) Xu Yifan
2. (Kazakhstan) Yulia Putintseva
3. (China) Zhang Kailin
4. (Poland) Magda Linette
5. (Hong Kong) Zhang Ling
6. (Croatia) Petra Martić

=== Qualifying draw ===
==== First qualifier ====
First round					Qualifying competition
					5	(Russia) Ekaterina Bychkova	3	1^{r}
WC	(Romania) Raluca Olaru	7	2	3	10	(China) Xu Yifan	6	4
10	(China) Xu Yifan	5	6	6

==== Second qualifier ====
First round					Qualifying competition
					2	(Kazakhstan) Yulia Putintseva	6	5	6
	(China) Liu Chang	6	4	7		(China) Liu Chang	3	7	4
7	(Bulgaria) Elitsa Kostova	4	6	5

==== Third qualifier ====
First round				Qualifying competition
				6	(Georgia (country)) Sofia Shapatava	4	7^{10}	2
WC	(Slovenia) Andreja Klepač	6^{5}	3	11	(China) Zhang Kailin	6	6^{8}	6
11	(China) Zhang Kailin	7^{7}	6

==== Fourth qualifier ====
First round				Qualifying competition
				4	(Poland) Magda Linette	6	6
	(Poland) Klaudia Jans-Ignacik	1	4	12	(China) Yang Zhaoxuan	2	0
12	(China) Yang Zhaoxuan	6	6

==== Fifth qualifier ====
First round				Qualifying competition
					(France) Laura Thorpe	1	4
	(China) Tian Ran	1	1	9	(Hong Kong) Zhang Ling	6	6
9	(Hong Kong) Zhang Ling	6	6

==== Sixth qualifier ====
First round					Qualifying competition
						(China) Xu Shilin	6^{1}	1
WC	(China) Liang Chen	6	4	6^{3}	8	(Croatia) Petra Martić	7^{7}	6
8	(Croatia) Petra Martić	4	6	7^{7}
