= 2014 Family Circle Cup =

- Date: March 31 – April 6
- Edition: 42nd
- Category: Premier level
- Draw: 56S / 16D
- Prize money: $710,000
- Surface: Clay / outdoor
- Location: Charleston, SC, United States
- Venue: Family Circle Tennis Center
- Attendance: 87,997

Champions

Singles
- (Germany) Andrea Petkovic

Doubles
- (Spain) Anabel Medina Garrigues (Kazakhstan) Yaroslava Shvedova
← 2013 ·	Family Circle Cup	· 2015 →

The 2014 Family Circle Cup was a women's tennis event on the 2014 WTA Tour. The event took place from March 31 to April 6, 2014. It was the 42nd edition of the tournament and a Premier level tournament. The event was hosted at the Family Circle Tennis Center, on Daniel Island, Charleston, United States. It is the only event of the clay court season played on green clay.

== Finals ==
=== Singles ===
- (Germany) Andrea Petkovic defeated (Slovakia) Jana Čepelová 7–5, 6–2

=== Doubles ===
- (Spain) Anabel Medina Garrigues / (Kazakhstan) Yaroslava Shvedova defeated (Chinese Taipei) Chan Hao-ching / (Chinese Taipei) Chan Yung-jan 7–6^{(7–4)}, 6–2

== Points and prize money ==
=== Point distribution ===
Event	W	F	SF	QF	Round of 16	Round of 32	Round of 64	Q	Q2	Q1
Singles	470	305	185	100	55	30	1	25	13	1
Doubles	470	305	185	100	1	—	—	—	—	—

=== Prize money ===
The total commitment prize money for this year's event was $710,000

Event	W	F	SF	QF	Round of 16	Round of 32	Round of 64	Q2	Q1
Singles	$120,000	$64,000	$31,510	$16,200	$8,400	$4,300	$2,200	$1,000	$600
Doubles	$38,000	$20,000	$11,000	$5,600	$3,035	—	—	—	—

== Singles main draw entrants ==
=== Seeds ===
Country	Player	Ranking^{1}	Seed
USA	Serena Williams	1	1
SRB	Jelena Janković	6	2
ITA	Sara Errani	10	3
GER	Sabine Lisicki	15	4
USA	Sloane Stephens	16	5
CAN	Eugenie Bouchard	19	6
AUS	Samantha Stosur	20	7
ROU	Sorana Cîrstea	26	8
CZE	Lucie Šafářová	27	9
RUS	Maria Kirilenko	29	10
USA	Venus Williams	31	11
SVK	Daniela Hantuchová	33	12
RUS	Elena Vesnina	35	13
GER	Andrea Petkovic	37	14
USA	Madison Keys	38	15
CHN	Zhang Shuai	41	16

- ^{1} Rankings as of March 17, 2014

=== Other entrants ===
The following players received wildcards into the main draw:

- (United States) Melanie Oudin
- (Russia) Nadia Petrova
- (United States) Shelby Rogers

The following player received entry using a protected ranking into the main draw:

- (Czech Republic) Petra Cetkovská

The following players received entry from the qualifying draw:

- (Switzerland) Belinda Bencic
- (Netherlands) Kiki Bertens
- (Australia) Jarmila Gajdošová
- (Russia) Alla Kudryavtseva
- (Portugal) Michelle Larcher de Brito
- (United States) Grace Min
- (Ukraine) Lesia Tsurenko
- (China) Zheng Saisai

=== Withdrawals ===
Before the tournament

- (France) Alizé Cornet → replaced by (France) Caroline Garcia
- (Australia) Casey Dellacqua → replaced by (Germany) Dinah Pfizenmaier
- (Slovenia) Polona Hercog → replaced by (France) Virginie Razzano
- (Russia) Svetlana Kuznetsova → replaced by (Spain) Anabel Medina Garrigues
- (United States) Bethanie Mattek-Sands (hip injury) → replaced by (Croatia) Mirjana Lučić-Baroni
- (Russia) Anastasia Pavlyuchenkova → replaced by (Israel) Julia Glushko
- (Kazakhstan) Galina Voskoboeva → replaced by (Germany) Julia Görges

=== Retirements ===
- (Netherlands) Kiki Bertens (lower back injury)

== Doubles main draw entrants ==
=== Seeds ===
Country	Player	Country	Player	Rank^{1}	Seed
TPE	Hsieh Su-wei	CHN	Peng Shuai	3	1
CZE	Květa Peschke	CZE	Lucie Šafářová	24	2
USA	Raquel Kops-Jones	USA	Abigail Spears	36	3
GER	Julia Görges	GER	Anna-Lena Grönefeld	41	4

- ^{1} Rankings as of March 17, 2014

=== Other entrants ===
The following pairs received wildcards into the doubles main draw:

- (Canada) Eugenie Bouchard / (United States) Taylor Townsend
- (Romania) Sorana Cîrstea / (Russia) Maria Kirilenko
- (Serbia) Jelena Janković / (Germany) Andrea Petkovic

The following pair received entry as alternates:

- (Australia) Jarmila Gajdošová / (China) Zheng Saisai

=== Withdrawals ===
Before the tournament

- (Czech Republic) Barbora Záhlavová-Strýcová (left wrist injury)

=== Retirements ===
- (China) Peng Shuai (abdominal strain)
- (Australia) Anastasia Rodionova (concussion)
