= 2014 Guangzhou International Women's Open =

- Date: September 15–20
- Edition: 11th
- Category: WTA International
- Surface: Hard
- Location: Guangzhou, China

Champions

Singles
- (Romania) Monica Niculescu

Doubles
- (Chinese Taipei) Chuang Chia-jung / (China) Liang Chen
← 2013 ·	Guangzhou International Women's Open	· 2015 →

The 2014 Guangzhou International Women's Open was a women's tennis tournament played on outdoor hard courts. It was the 11th edition of the Guangzhou International Women's Open, and part of the WTA International tournaments of the 2014 WTA Tour. It took place in Guangzhou, China, from September 15 through September 20, 2014.

== Point distribution ==
Event	W	F	SF	QF	Round of 16	Round of 32	Q	Q2	Q1
Singles	280	180	110	60	30	1	18	12	1
Doubles	280	180	110	60	1	—	—	—	—

== Prize money ==
Event	W	F	SF	QF	Round of 16	Round of 32^{1}	Q2	Q1
Singles	$111,163	$55,323	$29,730	$8,934	$4,928	$3,199	$1,852	$1,081
Doubles *	$17,724	$9,222	$4,951	$2,623	$1,383	—	—	—

_{^{1} Qualifiers prize money is also the Round of 32 prize money}
_{* per team}

== Singles main-draw entrants ==
=== Seeds ===
Country	Player	Rank^{1}	Seed
AUS	Samantha Stosur	20	1
FRA	Alizé Cornet	22	2
USA	Sloane Stephens	27	3
SRB	Bojana Jovanovski	35	4
KAZ	Zarina Diyas	40	5
ITA	Roberta Vinci	44	6
SVK	Jana Čepelová	53	7
GER	Annika Beck	58	8

- ^{1} Rankings are as of September 8, 2014.

=== Other entrants ===
The following players received wildcards into the singles main draw:

- (Chinese Taipei) Hsieh Su-wei
- (China) Wang Yafan
- (China) Zhu Lin

The following players received entry from the qualifying draw:

- (Poland) Magda Linette
- (Croatia) Petra Martić
- (Kazakhstan) Yulia Putintseva
- (China) Xu Yifan
- (China) Zhang Kailin
- (Hong Kong) Zhang Ling

=== Withdrawals ===
Before the tournament

- (United States) Vania King → replaced by (Austria) Patricia Mayr-Achleitner
- (China) Peng Shuai → replaced by (France) Pauline Parmentier
- (China) Zhang Shuai (right arm injury) → replaced by (Belgium) Alison Van Uytvanck

== Doubles main-draw entrants ==
=== Seeds ===
Country	Player	Country	Player	Rank^{1}	Seed
JPN	Misaki Doi	CHN	Xu Yifan	143	1
SLO	Andreja Klepač	ESP	María Teresa Torró Flor	143	2
POL	Klaudia Jans-Ignacik	POL	Katarzyna Piter	149	3
ROU	Raluca Olaru	ISR	Shahar Pe'er	158	4

- ^{1} Rankings are as of September 8, 2014.

=== Withdrawals ===
During the tournament

- (Bulgaria) Elitsa Kostova (viral illness)

== Champions ==
=== Singles ===
- (Romania) Monica Niculescu def. (France) Alizé Cornet, 6–4, 6–0

=== Doubles ===
- (Chinese Taipei) Chuang Chia-jung / (China) Liang Chen def. (France) Alizé Cornet / (Poland) Magda Linette, 2–6, 7–6^{(7–3)}, [10–7]
