= 2013 Guangzhou International Women's Open – Singles =

Singles
- 2013 Guangzhou International Women's Open

Final
- Champion: (China) Zhang Shuai
- Runner-up: (United States) Vania King
- Score: 7–6^{(7–1)}, 6–1

Details
- Draw: 32
- Seeds: 8

Events
Singles	Doubles
- Guangzhou International Women's Open

Hsieh Su-wei was the defending champion, but lost in the second round to Zhang Shuai.

Zhang went on to win her first WTA title, defeating Vania King in the final 7–6^{(7–1)}, 6–1.

== Seeds ==
1. (Romania) Sorana Cîrstea (first round)
2. (France) Alizé Cornet (quarterfinals)
3. (United Kingdom) Laura Robson (quarterfinals)
4. (China) Peng Shuai (second round)
5. (Poland) Urszula Radwańska (first round)
6. (Chinese Taipei) Hsieh Su-wei (second round)
7. (United States) Varvara Lepchenko (first round)
8. (Puerto Rico) Monica Puig (quarterfinals)

== Draw ==
Key

- Q = Qualifier
- WC = Wild card
- LL = Lucky loser
- Alt = Alternate
- ITF = ITF entry
- PR = Protected ranking
- SR = Special ranking
- SE = Special exempt
- JE = Junior exempt
- JR = Junior Accelerator Programme entrant
- CO = College Accelerator Programme entrant
- NG = Next Gen Accelerator Program entrant
- w/o = Walkover
- r = Retired
- d = Defaulted

=== Finals ===
Semifinals
Q	(United States) Vania King	3	7	6
(China) Zheng Jie	6	5	3
WC	(China) Zhang Shuai	6	6
(Austria) Yvonne Meusburger	1	1

Final
Q	(United States) Vania King	6^{1}	1
WC	(China) Zhang Shuai	7^{7}	6

=== Top half ===
First round
1	(Romania) S Cîrstea	2	1
(Serbia) B Jovanovski	6	6
Q	(United States) V King	2	6	6
(South Africa) C Scheepers	6	1	3
(Kazakhstan) G Voskoboeva	6	6
PR	(Czech Republic) P Cetkovská	3	1
Q	(Ukraine) N Kichenok	5	6^{4}
8	(Puerto Rico) M Puig	7	7^{7}
3	(United Kingdom) L Robson	6	6
Q	(Serbia) J Jakšić	2	4
WC	(China) S Zheng	6^{3}	6	7
Q	(Thailand) L Kumkhum	7^{7}	3	5
(Kazakhstan) Y Shvedova	1	4
(China) J Zheng	6	6
(Hungary) T Babos	7^{10}	7
7	(United States) V Lepchenko	6^{8}	5

Second round
(Serbia) B Jovanovski	4	6	4
Q	(United States) V King	6	0	6
(Kazakhstan) G Voskoboeva	3	2
8	(Puerto Rico) M Puig	6	6
3	(United Kingdom) L Robson	6	7^{7}
WC	(China) S Zheng	3	6^{4}
(China) J Zheng	7	7^{7}
(Hungary) T Babos	5	6^{1}

Quarterfinals
Q	(United States) V King	1	7	7^{7}
8	(Puerto Rico) M Puig	6	5	6^{5}
3	(United Kingdom) L Robson	6	6^{5}	2
(China) J Zheng	1	7^{7}	6

Semifinals
Q	(United States) V King	3	7	6
(China) J Zheng	6	5	3

=== Bottom half ===
First round
6	(Chinese Taipei) S-w Hsieh	6	6
(Argentina) P Ormaechea	1	2
WC	(China) S Zhang	6	7^{7}
(Russia) O Puchkova	0	6^{1}
Q	(United Kingdom) J Konta	6	6
Q	(Netherlands) R Hogenkamp	3	2
WC	(Israel) S Pe'er	3	4
4	(China) S Peng	6	6
5	(Poland) U Radwańska	5	2
(Serbia) V Dolonc	7	6
(Austria) Y Meusburger	6	6
(Ukraine) L Tsurenko	3	4
(Czech Republic) Ka Plíšková	6	6
(Sweden) J Larsson	4	3
(Belarus) O Govortsova	3	1
2	(France) A Cornet	6	6

Second round
6	(Chinese Taipei) S-w Hsieh	2	2
WC	(China) S Zhang	6	6
Q	(United Kingdom) J Konta	6	6
4	(China) S Peng	1	3
(Serbia) V Dolonc	6	2	4
(Austria) Y Meusburger	2	6	6
(Czech Republic) Ka Plíšková	6^{4}	0
2	(France) A Cornet	7^{7}	6

Quarterfinals
WC	(China) S Zhang	7	6
Q	(United Kingdom) J Konta	5	3
(Austria) Y Meusburger	6	6
2	(France) A Cornet	4	1

Semifinals
WC	(China) S Zhang	6	6
(Austria) Y Meusburger	1	1

== Qualifying ==
=== Seeds ===
1. (Japan) Kurumi Nara (qualifying competition)
2. (Israel) Julia Glushko (first round)
3. (Ukraine) Nadiia Kichenok (qualified)
4. (Thailand) Luksika Kumkhum (qualified)
5. (France) Mathilde Johansson (first round)
6. (Slovenia) Tadeja Majerič (qualifying competition)
7. (United States) Vania King (qualified)
8. (United Kingdom) Johanna Konta (qualified)
9. (Serbia) Jovana Jakšić (qualified)
10. (Kazakhstan) Zarina Diyas (qualifying competition)
11. (Netherlands) Richèl Hogenkamp (qualified)
12. (Ukraine) Lyudmyla Kichenok (qualifying competition)

=== Qualifiers ===
1. (United Kingdom) Johanna Konta
2. (Netherlands) Richèl Hogenkamp
3. (Ukraine) Nadiia Kichenok
4. (Thailand) Luksika Kumkhum
5. (United States) Vania King
6. (Serbia) Jovana Jakšić

=== Qualifying draw ===
==== First qualifier ====
First round
1	(Japan) Kurumi Nara	6	6
(China) Wen Xin	1	1
(Bolivia) María Fernanda Álvarez Terán	6	1	4
8	(United Kingdom) Johanna Konta	3	6	6

Qualifying competition
1	(Japan) Kurumi Nara	3	2
8	(United Kingdom) Johanna Konta	6	6

==== Second qualifier ====
First round
2	(Israel) Julia Glushko	1	3
(China) Wang Qiang	6	6
WC	(China) Tian Ran	1	3
11	(Netherlands) Richèl Hogenkamp	6	6

Qualifying competition
(China) Wang Qiang	6^{1}	5
11	(Netherlands) Richèl Hogenkamp	7^{7}	7

==== Third qualifier ====
First round
3	(Ukraine) Nadiia Kichenok	1	7	6
(China) Yang Zi	6	5	3
(Hong Kong) Zhang Ling	5	3
12	(Ukraine) Lyudmyla Kichenok	7	6

Qualifying competition
3	(Ukraine) Nadiia Kichenok	6	6
12	(Ukraine) Lyudmyla Kichenok	4	4

==== Fourth qualifier ====
First round
4	(Thailand) Luksika Kumkhum	6	6
WC	(China) Tang Haochen	1	0
WC	(China) Yang Zhaoxuan	2	4
10	(Kazakhstan) Zarina Diyas	6	6

Qualifying competition
4	(Thailand) Luksika Kumkhum	6	6
10	(Kazakhstan) Zarina Diyas	3	1

==== Fifth qualifier ====
First round
5	(France) Mathilde Johansson	7^{7}	3	4
(Chinese Taipei) Chan Yung-jan	6^{3}	6	6
(Russia) Arina Rodionova	3	1
7	(United States) Vania King	6	6

Qualifying competition
(Chinese Taipei) Chan Yung-jan	1	6	4
7	(United States) Vania King	6	3	6

==== Sixth qualifier ====
First round
6	(Slovenia) Tadeja Majerič	6	3	7
WC	(China) Zhao Di	4	6	5
(China) Liu Chang	7^{7}	5	2
9	(Serbia) Jovana Jakšić	6^{5}	7	6

Qualifying competition
6	(Slovenia) Tadeja Majerič	6	2	6^{4}
9	(Serbia) Jovana Jakšić	4	6	7^{7}
