= Dominika Kaňáková =

Czech tennis player

- Full name: Dominika Kaňáková
- Country (sports): Czech Republic
- Born: 25 February 1991 (age 34); Frýdek-Místek, Czechoslovakia
- Height: 1.75 m (5 ft 9 in)
- Prize money: $8,449

Singles
- Career record: 20–28
- Career titles: 0
- Highest ranking: 723 (12 July 2010)

Doubles
- Career record: 15–14
- Career titles: 1 ITF
- Highest ranking: 645 (24 May 2010)

Dominika Kaňáková (born 25 February 1991) is a Czech tennis player.

Kaňáková has won one doubles title on the ITF tour in her career. On 12 July 2010, she reached her best singles ranking of world number 723. On 24 May 2010, she peaked at world number 645 in the doubles rankings.

In April 2013, Kaňáková made her WTA tour debut at the 2013 Family Circle Cup alongside Bulgarian Jaklin Alawi in doubles.

== ITF finals ==
=== Singles (0–2) ===
Legend $100,000 tournaments $75,000 tournaments $50,000 tournaments $25,000 tournaments $10,000 tournaments	Finals by surface Hard (0–0) Clay (0–2) Grass (0–0) Carpet (0–0)

Result	No.	Date	Tournament	Surface	Opponent	Score
Loss	1.	28 August 2007	Prague, Czech Republic	Clay	(Czech Republic) Soňa Nováková	6–1, 2–6, 6–7^{(5–7)}
Loss	2.	24 August 2009	Prague, Czech Republic	Clay	(Czech Republic) Martina Kubičíková	4–6, 1–6

=== Doubles (1–1) ===
Legend $100,000 tournaments $75,000 tournaments $50,000 tournaments $25,000 tournaments $10,000 tournaments	Finals by surface Hard (0–0) Clay (1–1) Grass (0–0) Carpet (0–0)

Result	No.	Date	Tournament	Surface	Partner	Opponents	Score
Loss	1.	8 June 2009	Budapest, Hungary	Clay	(Czech Republic) Eva Pigová	(Slovakia) Veronika Blašková (Czech Republic) Barbora Krtičková	4–6, 4–6
Win	1.	22 March 2010	Cairo, Egypt	Clay	(Czech Republic) Jana Jandová	(United States) Ivana King (France) Alizé Lim	6–2, 6–2
