= 2013 Guangzhou International Women's Open =

- Date: September 16–21
- Edition: 10th
- Category: WTA International
- Surface: Hard
- Location: Guangzhou, China

Champions

Singles
- (China) Zhang Shuai

Doubles
- (Chinese Taipei) Hsieh Su-wei / (China) Peng Shuai
← 2012 ·	Guangzhou International Women's Open	· 2014 →

The 2013 Guangzhou International Women's Open (named as GRC Bank Guangzhou International Women's Open for sponsorship reasons) was a women's tennis tournament played on outdoor hard courts. It was the 10th edition of the Guangzhou International Women's Open, and part of the WTA International tournaments of the 2013 WTA Tour. It took place in Guangzhou, China, from September 16 through September 21, 2013. Unseeded Zhang Shuai, who entered the main draw on a wildcard, won the singles title.

== Finals ==
=== Singles ===
(China) Zhang Shuai defeated (United States) Vania King, 7–6^{(7–1)}, 6–1

- It was Zhang's first WTA singles title.

=== Doubles ===
(Chinese Taipei) Hsieh Su-wei / (China) Peng Shuai defeated (United States) Vania King / (Kazakhstan) Galina Voskoboeva, 6–3, 4–6, [12–10]

== Singles main-draw entrants ==
=== Seeds ===
Country	Player	Rank^{1}	Seed
ROU	Sorana Cîrstea	22	1
FRA	Alizé Cornet	29	2
GBR	Laura Robson	35	3
CHN	Peng Shuai	37	4
POL	Urszula Radwańska	38	5
TPE	Hsieh Su-wei	39	6
USA	Varvara Lepchenko	44	7
PUR	Monica Puig	45	8

- ^{1} Rankings are as of September 9, 2013

=== Other entrants ===
The following players received wildcards into the singles main draw:

- (Israel) Shahar Pe'er
- (China) Zhang Shuai
- (China) Zheng Saisai

The following players received entry from the qualifying draw:

- (Netherlands) Richèl Hogenkamp
- (Serbia) Jovana Jakšić
- (Ukraine) Nadiia Kichenok
- (United States) Vania King
- (United Kingdom) Johanna Konta
- (Thailand) Luksika Kumkhum

=== Withdrawals ===
Before the tournament

- (Italy) Karin Knapp
- (Romania) Monica Niculescu

== Doubles main-draw entrants ==
=== Seeds ===
Country	Player	Country	Player	Rank^{1}	Seed
CHN	Peng Shuai	TPE	Hsieh Su-wei	18	1
USA	Varvara Lepchenko	CHN	Zheng Saisai	79	2
USA	Vania King	KAZ	Galina Voskoboeva	94	3
HUN	Tímea Babos	BLR	Olga Govortsova	112	4

- ^{1} Rankings are as of September 9, 2013

=== Other entrants ===
The following pairs received wildcards into the doubles main draw:

- (China) Liu Chang / (China) Tian Ran
- (China) Tang Hao Chen / (China) Yang Zhaoxuan
