= 2014 Guangzhou International Women's Open – Doubles =

Doubles
- 2014 Guangzhou International Women's Open

Final
- Champions: (Chinese Taipei) Chuang Chia-jung (China) Liang Chen
- Runners-up: (France) Alizé Cornet (Poland) Magda Linette
- Score: 2–6, 7–6^{(7–3)}, [10–7]

Events
Singles	Doubles
← 2013 ·	Guangzhou International Women's Open	· 2015 →

Hsieh Su-wei and Peng Shuai were the defending champions, but they chose not to participate this year.
Chuang Chia-jung and Liang Chen won the title, defeating Alizé Cornet and Magda Linette in the final, 2–6, 7–6^{(7–3)}, [10–7], despite being a match point down in the second set.

== Seeds ==
1. (Japan) Misaki Doi / (China) Xu Yifan (semifinals)
2. (Slovenia) Andreja Klepač / (Spain) María Teresa Torró Flor (semifinals)
3. (Poland) Klaudia Jans-Ignacik / (Poland) Katarzyna Piter (first round)
4. (Romania) Raluca Olaru / (Israel) Shahar Pe'er (quarterfinals)

== Draw ==
=== Key ===
- Q = Qualifier
- WC = Wild card
- LL = Lucky loser
- Alt = Alternate
- ITF = ITF entry
- PR = Protected ranking
- SR = Special ranking
- SE = Special exempt
- JE = Junior exempt
- JR = Junior Accelerator Programme entrant
- CO = College Accelerator Programme entrant
- NG = Next Gen Accelerator Program entrant
- w/o = Walkover
- r = Retired
- d = Defaulted

=== Draw ===
First round
(Sweden) J Larsson (United Kingdom) A Smith	2	4
(Germany) A Beck (Croatia) P Martić	6	6
3	(Poland) K Jans-Ignacik (Poland) K Piter	2	6	[5]
(France) A Cornet (Poland) M Linette	6	4	[10]
(France) L Thorpe (China) K Zhang	6	7
(China) C Liu (China) R Tian	3	5
(China) Y Wang (China) L Zhu	6^{5}	1
4	(Romania) R Olaru (Israel) S Pe'er	7^{7}	6
(China) S Xu (China) Z Yang	3	6^{7}
(Bulgaria) E Kostova (Romania) M Niculescu	6	7^{9}

Quarterfinals
1	(Japan) M Doi (China) Y Xu	6	7^{7}
(Germany) A Beck (Croatia) P Martić	3	6^{3}
(France) A Cornet (Poland) M Linette	6	1	[10]
(France) L Thorpe (China) K Zhang	3	6	[5]
(Chinese Taipei) C-j Chuang (China) C Liang	6	1	[10]
4	(Romania) R Olaru (Israel) S Pe'er	3	6	[5]
(Bulgaria) E Kostova (Romania) M Niculescu
2	(Slovenia) A Klepač (Spain) MT Torró Flor	w/o

Semifinals
1	(Japan) M Doi (China) Y Xu	6^{5}	6^{5}
(France) A Cornet (Poland) M Linette	7^{7}	7^{7}
(Chinese Taipei) C-j Chuang (China) C Liang	7^{7}	5	[12]
2	(Slovenia) A Klepač (Spain) MT Torró Flor	6^{2}	7	[10]

Final
(France) A Cornet (Poland) M Linette	6	6^{3}	[7]
(Chinese Taipei) C-j Chuang (China) C Liang	2	7^{7}	[10]
