= 2013 Family Circle Cup =

- Date: April 1–7
- Edition: 41st
- Category: WTA Premier
- Draw: 56S / 16D
- Prize money: $795,707
- Surface: Clay / outdoor
- Location: Charleston, United States
- Venue: Family Circle Tennis Center
- Attendance: 78,147

Champions

Singles
- (United States) Serena Williams

Doubles
- (France) Kristina Mladenovic / (Czech Republic) Lucie Šafářová
← 2012 ·	Family Circle Cup	· 2014 →

The 2013 Family Circle Cup was a women's tennis event in the 2013 WTA Tour. It took place from March 30 to April 7, 2013. It was the 41st edition of the tournament and a Premier level tournament. The event was hosted at the Family Circle Tennis Center, on Daniel Island, Charleston, United States. It was the only event of the clay courts season played on green clay. First-seeded Serena Williams won the singles title

== Finals ==
=== Singles ===
- (United States) Serena Williams defeated (Serbia) Jelena Janković, 3–6, 6–0, 6–2

=== Doubles ===
- (France) Kristina Mladenovic / (Czech Republic) Lucie Šafářová defeated (Czech Republic) Andrea Hlaváčková / (United States) Liezel Huber 6–3, 7–6^{(8–6)}

== Points and prize money ==
=== Point distribution ===
Event	W	F	SF	QF	Round of 16	Round of 32	Round of 64	Q	Q2	Q1
Singles	470	320	200	120	60	40	1	12	8	1
Doubles	470	320	200	120	1	—	—	—	—	—

=== Prize money ===
The total commitment prize money for this year's event was $795,707

Event	W	F	SF	QF	Round of 16	Round of 32	Round of 64	Q2	Q1
Singles	$125,000	$65,000	$32,825	$16,990	$8,645	$4,480	$2,275	$1,300	$700
Doubles	$40,000	$21,137	$10,830	$5,420	$2,810	—	—	—	—

== Singles main draw entrants ==
=== Seeds ===
Country	Player	Ranking^{1}	Seed
USA	Serena Williams	1	1
DEN	Caroline Wozniacki	9	2
AUS	Samantha Stosur	10	3
USA	Sloane Stephens	16	4
USA	Venus Williams	18	5
CZE	Lucie Šafářová	19	6
ESP	Carla Suárez Navarro	21	7
GER	Mona Barthel	23	8
SRB	Jelena Janković	24	9
GER	Julia Görges	26	10
ROU	Sorana Cîrstea	27	11
USA	Varvara Lepchenko	29	12
AUT	Tamira Paszek	31	13
KAZ	Yaroslava Shvedova	35	14
GER	Sabine Lisicki	37	15
GBR	Laura Robson	43	16

- ^{1} Rankings as of March 18, 2013.

=== Other entrants ===
The following players received wildcards into the main draw:

- (United States) Bethanie Mattek-Sands
- (Germany) Andrea Petkovic
- (United States) Taylor Townsend
- (Denmark) Caroline Wozniacki

The following players received entry from the qualifying draw:

- (Canada) Eugenie Bouchard
- (United States) Mallory Burdette
- (Italy) Nastassja Burnett
- (France) Caroline Garcia
- (United States) Vania King
- (United States) Grace Min
- (United States) Jessica Pegula
- (Brazil) Teliana Pereira

=== Withdrawals ===
Before the tournament

- (Czech Republic) Petra Cetkovská
- (Italy) Sara Errani (thigh injury)
- (Slovenia) Polona Hercog
- (Czech Republic) Lucie Hradecká
- (Estonia) Kaia Kanepi
- (France) Pauline Parmentier
- (Kazakhstan) Ksenia Pervak
- (Russia) Elena Vesnina
- (Spain) Lourdes Domínguez Lino
- (United Kingdom) Heather Watson (left adductor injury)

During the tournament

- (Spain) Anabel Medina Garrigues (right knee injury)
- (Germany) Andrea Petkovic (right calf injury)

=== Retirements ===
During the tournament

- (Austria) Tamira Paszek (left neck injury)
- (Australia) Samantha Stosur (right calf strain)

== Doubles main draw entrants ==
=== Seeds ===
Country	Player	Country	Player	Rank^{1}	Seed
CZE	Andrea Hlaváčková	USA	Liezel Huber	16	1
USA	Raquel Kops-Jones	USA	Abigail Spears	29	2
USA	Vania King	USA	Lisa Raymond	41	3
GER	Julia Görges	KAZ	Yaroslava Shvedova	49	4

- ^{1} Rankings are as of March 18, 2013.

=== Other entrants ===
The following pairs received wildcards into the doubles main draw:

- (Bulgaria) Jaklin Alawi / (Czech Republic) Dominika Kaňáková
- (Serbia) Jelena Janković / (Germany) Andrea Petkovic

The following pair received entry as alternates:

- (New Zealand) Marina Erakovic / (United States) Jessica Pegula

=== Withdrawals ===
Before the tournament

- (Spain) Anabel Medina Garrigues (right knee injury)
