= 2014 Family Circle Cup – Doubles =

Doubles
- 2014 Family Circle Cup

Final
- Champions: (Spain) Anabel Medina Garrigues (Kazakhstan) Yaroslava Shvedova
- Runners-up: (Chinese Taipei) Chan Hao-ching (Chinese Taipei) Chan Yung-jan
- Score: 7–6^{(7–4)}, 6–2

Details
- Draw: 16
- Seeds: 4

Events
Singles	Doubles
← 2013 ·	Family Circle Cup	· 2015 →

Kristina Mladenovic and Lucie Šafářová were the defending champions, but Mladenovic chose not to participate this year. Šafářová played alongside Květa Peschke, but they lost in the first round to Chan Hao-ching and Chan Yung-jan.

Anabel Medina Garrigues and Yaroslava Shvedova won the tournament, defeating the Chan sisters in the final, 7–6^{(7–4)}, 6–2.

== Seeds ==
1. (Chinese Taipei) Hsieh Su-wei / (China) Peng Shuai (first round; retired because of abdominal strain (Peng))
2. (Czech Republic) Květa Peschke / (Czech Republic) Lucie Šafářová (first round)
3. (United States) Raquel Kops-Jones / (United States) Abigail Spears (semifinals)
4. (Germany) Julia Görges / (Germany) Anna-Lena Grönefeld (quarterfinals)

== Draw ==
=== Key ===
- Q = Qualifier
- WC = Wild card
- LL = Lucky loser
- Alt = Alternate
- SE = Special exempt
- PR = Protected ranking
- ITF = ITF entry
- JE = Junior exempt
- w/o = Walkover
- r = Retired
- d = Defaulted
- SR = Special ranking

First round
1	(Chinese Taipei) S-w Hsieh (China) S Peng	4^{r}
(New Zealand) M Erakovic (Spain) A Parra Santonja	5
(Spain) A Medina Garrigues (Kazakhstan) Y Shvedova	6^{0}	6	[10]
WC	(Canada) E Bouchard (United States) T Townsend	7^{7}	3	[7]
3	(United States) R Kops-Jones (United States) A Spears	6	3	[11]
Alt	(Australia) J Gajdošová (China) S Zheng	3	6	[9]
(United States) L Huber (United States) L Raymond	5	6	[7]
WC	(Serbia) J Janković (Germany) A Petkovic	7	2	[10]
(Croatia) M Lučić-Baroni (Russia) N Petrova	2	6	[3]
(Russia) A Kudryavtseva (Australia) A Rodionova	6	2	[10]
(Slovakia) J Husárová (United States) V Lepchenko	2	7^{7}	[5]
4	(Germany) J Görges (Germany) A-L Grönefeld	6	6^{3}	[10]
(Poland) A Rosolska (South Africa) C Scheepers	6	3	[9]
WC	(Romania) S Cîrstea (Russia) M Kirilenko	4	6	[11]
(Chinese Taipei) H-c Chan (Chinese Taipei) Y-j Chan	6	6
2	(Czech Republic) K Peschke (Czech Republic) L Šafářová	4	4

Quarterfinals
(New Zealand) M Erakovic (Spain) A Parra Santonja	2	1
(Spain) A Medina Garrigues (Kazakhstan) Y Shvedova	6	6
3	(United States) R Kops-Jones (United States) A Spears	6	1	[16]
WC	(Serbia) J Janković (Germany) A Petkovic	4	6	[14]
(Russia) A Kudryavtseva (Australia) A Rodionova	6	6
4	(Germany) J Görges (Germany) A-L Grönefeld	1	4
WC	(Romania) S Cîrstea (Russia) M Kirilenko	3	6	[8]
(Chinese Taipei) H-c Chan (Chinese Taipei) Y-j Chan	6	4	[10]

Semifinals
(Spain) A Medina Garrigues (Kazakhstan) Y Shvedova	7	6^{5}	[10]
3	(United States) R Kops-Jones (United States) A Spears	5	7^{7}	[8]
(Russia) A Kudryavtseva (Australia) A Rodionova	2	1^{r}
(Chinese Taipei) H-c Chan (Chinese Taipei) Y-j Chan	6	3

Final
(Spain) A Medina Garrigues (Kazakhstan) Y Shvedova	7^{7}	6
(Chinese Taipei) H-c Chan (Chinese Taipei) Y-j Chan	6^{4}	2
