= 2013 Family Circle Cup – Singles =

Singles
- 2013 Family Circle Cup

Final
- Champion: (United States) Serena Williams
- Runner-up: (Serbia) Jelena Janković
- Score: 3–6, 6–0, 6–2

Details
- Draw: 56
- Seeds: 16

Events
Singles	Doubles
- Family Circle Cup

Defending champion Serena Williams defeated Jelena Janković in the final, 3–6, 6–0, 6–2 to win the singles tennis title at the 2013 Charleston Open. She was the first player to defend the title in 18 years, since Conchita Martínez in 1995.

== Seeds ==
The top eight seeds receive a bye into the second round.

1. (United States) Serena Williams (champion)
2. (Denmark) Caroline Wozniacki (quarterfinals)
3. (Australia) Samantha Stosur (third round, retired)
4. (United States) Sloane Stephens (second round)
5. (United States) Venus Williams (semifinals)
6. (Czech Republic) Lucie Šafářová (quarterfinals)
7. (Spain) Carla Suárez Navarro (second round)
8. (Germany) Mona Barthel (second round)
9. (Serbia) Jelena Janković (final)
10. (Germany) Julia Görges (third round)
11. (Romania) Sorana Cîrstea (third round)
12. (United States) Varvara Lepchenko (third round)
13. (Austria) Tamira Paszek (first round, retired)
14. (Kazakhstan) Yaroslava Shvedova (first round)
15. (Germany) Sabine Lisicki (second round)
16. (United Kingdom) Laura Robson (second round)

== Draw ==
Key

- Q = Qualifier
- WC = Wild card
- LL = Lucky loser
- Alt = Alternate
- ITF = ITF entry
- PR = Protected ranking
- SR = Special ranking
- SE = Special exempt
- JE = Junior exempt
- JR = Junior Accelerator Programme entrant
- CO = College Accelerator Programme entrant
- NG = Next Gen Accelerator Program entrant
- w/o = Walkover
- r = Retired
- d = Defaulted

=== Finals ===
Quarterfinals
1	(United States) Serena Williams	6	6
6	(Czech Republic) Lucie Šafářová	4	1
(United States) Madison Keys	4	4
5	(United States) Venus Williams	6	6
9	(Serbia) Jelena Janković	6	6
Q	(Canada) Eugenie Bouchard	2	1
(Switzerland) Stefanie Vögele	3	6	6
2	(Denmark) Caroline Wozniacki	6	4	3

Semifinals
1	(United States) Serena Williams	6	6
5	(United States) Venus Williams	1	2
9	(Serbia) Jelena Janković	6	6^{6}	6
(Switzerland) Stefanie Vögele	4	7^{8}	2

Final
1	(United States) Serena Williams	3	6	6
9	(Serbia) Jelena Janković	6	0	2

=== Top half ===
==== Section 1 ====
First round
(Luxembourg) M Minella	4	4
(Italy) C Giorgi	6	6
Q	(United States) M Burdette	6	1	6
(France) K Mladenovic	1	6	0
(Georgia (country)) A Tatishvili	0	0
15	(Germany) S Lisicki	6	6
11	(Romania) S Cîrstea	6	7^{7}
(Germany) T Malek	4	6^{5}
(Netherlands) A Rus	2	2
(Spain) A Medina Garrigues	6	6
(Switzerland) R Oprandi	6	1	3
(Croatia) M Lučić-Baroni	4	6	6

Second round
1	(United States) S Williams	6	6
(Italy) C Giorgi	2	3
Q	(United States) M Burdette	3	7^{7}	7
15	(Germany) S Lisicki	6	6^{5}	5
11	(Romania) S Cîrstea	w/o
(Spain) A Medina Garrigues
(Croatia) M Lučić-Baroni	5	1
6	(Czech Republic) L Šafářová	7	6

Third round
1	(United States) S Williams	6	6
Q	(United States) M Burdette	4	2
11	(Romania) S Cîrstea	3	7	1
6	(Czech Republic) L Šafářová	6	5	6

Quarterfinals
1	(United States) S Williams	6	6
6	(Czech Republic) L Šafářová	4	1

==== Section 2 ====
First round
(Australia) A Rodionova	4	7^{7}	6^{3}
WC	(United States) B Mattek-Sands	6	6^{4}	7^{7}
(Romania) A Cadanțu	6^{3}	4
(United States) M Keys	7^{7}	6
Q	(United States) G Min	6	0
13	(Austria) T Paszek	3	0^{r}
12	(United States) V Lepchenko	6	4	6
(United States) C McHale	3	6	2
(Hungary) M Czink	7	3	5
(France) M Johansson	5	6	7
(Puerto Rico) M Puig	6	6
(Czech Republic) A Hlaváčková	4	0

Second round
4	(United States) S Stephens	2	0
WC	(United States) B Mattek-Sands	6	6
(United States) M Keys	6	6
Q	(United States) G Min	4	3
12	(United States) V Lepchenko	6	4	6
(France) M Johansson	1	6	1
(Puerto Rico) M Puig	2	7	3
5	(United States) V Williams	6	5	6

Third round
WC	(United States) B Mattek-Sands	6^{4}	4
(United States) M Keys	7^{7}	6
12	(United States) V Lepchenko	2	6	2
5	(United States) V Williams	6	4	6

Quarterfinals
(United States) M Keys	4	4
5	(United States) V Williams	6	6

=== Bottom half ===
==== Section 3 ====
First round
(Spain) G Muguruza	7^{7}	4	5
Q	(United States) J Pegula	6^{2}	6	7
(South Africa) C Scheepers	6^{6}	4
Q	(France) C Garcia	7^{8}	6
(United States) M Oudin	4	7	4
9	(Serbia) J Janković	6	5	6
16	(United Kingdom) L Robson	6	6
(Spain) E Cabeza Candela	2	2
Q	(Italy) N Burnett	2	3
Q	(Canada) E Bouchard	6	6
(Slovakia) D Hantuchová	6^{2}	4
(New Zealand) M Erakovic	7^{7}	6

Second round
8	(Germany) M Barthel	6^{4}	1
Q	(United States) J Pegula	7^{7}	6
Q	(France) C Garcia	7	6^{10}	3
9	(Serbia) J Janković	5	7^{12}	6
16	(United Kingdom) L Robson	4	6	1
Q	(Canada) E Bouchard	6	3	6
(New Zealand) M Erakovic	1	2
3	(Australia) S Stosur	6	6

Third round
Q	(United States) J Pegula	0	4
9	(Serbia) J Janković	6	6
Q	(Canada) E Bouchard	6	2
3	(Australia) S Stosur	1	0^{r}

Quarterfinals
9	(Serbia) J Janković	6	6
Q	(Canada) E Bouchard	2	1

==== Section 4 ====
First round
(Switzerland) S Vögele	4	6	6
Q	(Brazil) T Pereira	6	2	4
(United States) J Hampton	4	7^{7}	4
(Belarus) O Govortsova	6	6^{3}	6
(Kazakhstan) Y Putintseva	2	3
10	(Germany) J Görges	6	6
14	(Kazakhstan) Y Shvedova	6	1	4
Q	(United States) V King	4	6	6
WC	(Germany) A Petkovic	6	6
WC	(United States) T Townsend	3	0
(Italy) F Schiavone	6	4	6^{6}
(Spain) S Soler Espinosa	3	6	7^{8}

Second round
7	(Spain) C Suárez Navarro	2	4
(Switzerland) S Vögele	6	6
(Belarus) O Govortsova	2	6	3
10	(Germany) J Görges	6	0	6
Q	(United States) V King	5	4
WC	(Germany) A Petkovic	7	6
(Spain) S Soler Espinosa	1	1
2	(Denmark) C Wozniacki	6	6

Third round
(Switzerland) S Vögele	3	6	6
10	(Germany) J Görges	6	1	3
WC	(Germany) A Petkovic
2	(Denmark) C Wozniacki	w/o

Quarterfinals
(Switzerland) S Vögele	3	6	6
2	(Denmark) C Wozniacki	6	4	3

== Qualifying ==
=== Seeds ===
1. (Czech Republic) Karolína Plíšková (qualifying competition)
2. (United States) Mallory Burdette (qualified)
3. (Czech Republic) Kristýna Plíšková (qualifying competition)
4. (Kazakhstan) Sesil Karatantcheva (qualifying competition)
5. (Brazil) Teliana Pereira (qualified)
6. (Canada) Eugenie Bouchard (qualified)
7. (China) Zhang Shuai (first round)
8. (Portugal) Michelle Larcher de Brito (qualifying competition)
9. (United States) Vania King (qualified)
10. (Argentina) Paula Ormaechea (qualifying competition)
11. (France) Caroline Garcia (qualified)
12. (Italy) Nastassja Burnett (qualified)
13. (United States) Jessica Pegula (qualified)
14. (United States) Irina Falconi (first round)
15. (Ukraine) Yuliya Beygelzimer (first round)
16. (United States) Grace Min (qualified)

=== Qualifiers ===
1. (United States) Vania King
2. (United States) Mallory Burdette
3. (France) Caroline Garcia
4. (United States) Grace Min
5. (Brazil) Teliana Pereira
6. (Canada) Eugenie Bouchard
7. (Italy) Nastassja Burnett
8. (United States) Jessica Pegula

=== Draw ===
==== First qualifier ====
First round
1	(Czech Republic) Karolína Plíšková	6	7
(United States) Alison Riske	3	5
(Russia) Arina Rodionova	1	3
9	(United States) Vania King	6	6

Qualifying competition
1	(Czech Republic) Karolína Plíšková	4	2
9	(United States) Vania King	6	6

==== Second qualifier ====
First round
2	(United States) Mallory Burdette	7^{7}	6
(Russia) Valeria Solovyeva	6^{3}	2
WC	(United States) Louisa Chirico	2	7^{7}	6
15	(Ukraine) Yuliya Beygelzimer	6	6^{3}	3

Qualifying competition
2	(United States) Mallory Burdette	6	6
WC	(United States) Louisa Chirico	4	1

==== Third qualifier ====
First round
3	(Czech Republic) Kristýna Plíšková	6	6
(United States) Chiara Scholl	0	1
WC	(United States) Sanaz Marand	6	3	0
11	(France) Caroline Garcia	4	6	6

Qualifying competition
3	(Czech Republic) Kristýna Plíšková	2	1
11	(France) Caroline Garcia	6	6

==== Fourth qualifier ====
First round
4	(Kazakhstan) Sesil Karatantcheva	3	6	6
(Colombia) Catalina Castaño	6	2	4
(United States) Shelby Rogers	6^{4}	2
16	(United States) Grace Min	7^{7}	6

Qualifying competition
4	(Kazakhstan) Sesil Karatantcheva	1	3
16	(United States) Grace Min	6	6

==== Fifth qualifier ====
First round
5	(Brazil) Teliana Pereira	6	6
(United States) Jennifer Elie	2	2
WC	(United States) Victoria Duval	6	3	3
10	(Argentina) Paula Ormaechea	3	6	6

Qualifying competition
5	(Brazil) Teliana Pereira	7	6
10	(Argentina) Paula Ormaechea	5	2

==== Sixth qualifier ====
First round
6	(Canada) Eugenie Bouchard	7	6
(Hungary) Katalin Marosi	5	2
(Brazil) Paula Cristina Gonçalves	6	6
14	(United States) Irina Falconi	4	4

Qualifying competition
6	(Canada) Eugenie Bouchard	6	6
(Brazil) Paula Cristina Gonçalves	1	0

==== Seventh qualifier ====
First round
7	(China) Zhang Shuai	6	0	2
(Slovenia) Petra Rampre	1	6	6
(Australia) Ashleigh Barty	1	1
12	(Italy) Nastassja Burnett	6	6

Qualifying competition
(Slovenia) Petra Rampre	3	6	4
12	(Italy) Nastassja Burnett	6	4	6

==== Eighth qualifier ====
First round
8	(Portugal) Michelle Larcher de Brito	6	6
WC	(United States) Hayley Carter	4	1
(United States) Jill Craybas	2	2
13	(United States) Jessica Pegula	6	6

Qualifying competition
8	(Portugal) Michelle Larcher de Brito	6^{4}	3
13	(United States) Jessica Pegula	7^{7}	6
