= 2014 Family Circle Cup – Singles =

Singles
- 2014 Family Circle Cup

Final
- Champion: (Germany) Andrea Petkovic
- Runner-up: (Slovakia) Jana Čepelová
- Score: 7–5, 6–2

Details
- Draw: 56
- Seeds: 16

Events
Singles	Doubles
- Family Circle Cup

Serena Williams was the two-time defending champion, but lost in the second round to Jana Čepelová, ending her 15-match winning streak at this tournament, and her 28-match winning streak on clay.

Andrea Petkovic won the title, defeating Čepelová in the final, 7–5, 6–2.

This was the last WTA tournament that former World No. 3 and two-time French Open semifinalist Nadia Petrova competed in. Having been awarded a wildcard into the main-draw, she was beaten by Marina Erakovic in the first round.

== Seeds ==
The top eight seeds received a bye into the second round.

1. (United States) Serena Williams (second round)
2. (Serbia) Jelena Janković (quarterfinals)
3. (Italy) Sara Errani (quarterfinals)
4. (Germany) Sabine Lisicki (third round)
5. (United States) Sloane Stephens (second round)
6. (Canada) Eugenie Bouchard (semifinals)
7. (Australia) Samantha Stosur (third round)
8. (Romania) Sorana Cîrstea (second round)
9. (Czech Republic) Lucie Šafářová (quarterfinals)
10. (Russia) Maria Kirilenko (first round)
11. (United States) Venus Williams (third round)
12. (Slovakia) Daniela Hantuchová (quarterfinals)
13. (Russia) Elena Vesnina (third round)
14. (Germany) Andrea Petkovic (champion)
15. (United States) Madison Keys (second round)
16. (China) Zhang Shuai (second round)

Click on the seed number of a player to go to their draw section.

== Draw ==
Key

- Q = Qualifier
- WC = Wild card
- LL = Lucky loser
- Alt = Alternate
- ITF = ITF entry
- PR = Protected ranking
- SR = Special ranking
- SE = Special exempt
- JE = Junior exempt
- JR = Junior Accelerator Programme entrant
- CO = College Accelerator Programme entrant
- NG = Next Gen Accelerator Program entrant
- w/o = Walkover
- r = Retired
- d = Defaulted

=== Finals ===
Quarterfinals
(Slovakia) Jana Čepelová	6	6
12	(Slovakia) Daniela Hantuchová	2	1
3	(Italy) Sara Errani	6	2	1
Q	(Switzerland) Belinda Bencic	4	6	6
9	(Czech Republic) Lucie Šafářová	3	6	1
14	(Germany) Andrea Petkovic	6	1	6
6	(Canada) Eugenie Bouchard	6	4	6
2	(Serbia) Jelena Janković	3	6	3

Semifinals
(Slovakia) Jana Čepelová	6	5	7^{9}
Q	(Switzerland) Belinda Bencic	4	7	6^{7}
14	(Germany) Andrea Petkovic	1	6	7
6	(Canada) Eugenie Bouchard	6	3	5

Final
(Slovakia) Jana Čepelová	5	2
14	(Germany) Andrea Petkovic	7	6

=== Top half ===
==== Section 1 ====
First round
WC	(United States) M Oudin	6^{2}	2
(Slovakia) J Čepelová	7^{7}	6
(United States) V Lepchenko	1	6	0
PR	(Czech Republic) P Cetkovská	6	2	6
(Slovakia) AK Schmiedlová	2	1
13	(Russia) E Vesnina	6	6
12	(Slovakia) D Hantuchová	7	7
WC	(United States) S Rogers	5	5
Q	(United States) G Min	6	1	6
Q	(Portugal) M Larcher de Brito	3	6	3
(Austria) P Mayr-Achleitner	1	6^{5}
(Brazil) T Pereira	6	7^{7}

Second round
1	(United States) S Williams	4	4
(Slovakia) J Čepelová	6	6
PR	(Czech Republic) P Cetkovská	6	2	4
13	(Russia) E Vesnina	3	6	6
12	(Slovakia) D Hantuchová	6	6
Q	(United States) G Min	2	3
(Brazil) T Pereira	3	6	7^{7}
8	(Romania) S Cîrstea	6	3	6^{0}

Third round
(Slovakia) J Čepelová	7^{7}	3	6
13	(Russia) E Vesnina	6^{4}	6	3
12	(Slovakia) D Hantuchová	6	6
(Brazil) T Pereira	2	3

Quarterfinals
(Slovakia) J Čepelová	6	6
12	(Slovakia) D Hantuchová	2	1

==== Section 2 ====
First round
(Argentina) P Ormaechea	5	6	3
Q	(Netherlands) K Bertens	7	3	6
(France) C Garcia	2	3
(China) S Peng	6	6
(Croatia) M Lučić-Baroni	6^{0}	6^{3}
15	(United States) M Keys	7^{7}	7^{7}
10	(Russia) M Kirilenko	1	5
Q	(Switzerland) B Bencic	6	7
(New Zealand) M Erakovic	4	6	6
WC	(Russia) N Petrova	6	3	4
(Ukraine) E Svitolina	6	5	7^{7}
Q	(Australia) J Gajdošová	1	7	6^{5}

Second round
3	(Italy) S Errani	6	0
Q	(Netherlands) K Bertens	3	0^{r}
(China) S Peng	6	6^{3}	7^{7}
15	(United States) M Keys	1	7^{7}	6^{4}
Q	(Switzerland) B Bencic	6	6
(New Zealand) M Erakovic	2	1
(Ukraine) E Svitolina	6	6
5	(United States) S Stephens	4	4

Third round
3	(Italy) S Errani	7^{8}	7^{7}
(China) S Peng	6^{6}	6^{5}
Q	(Switzerland) B Bencic	6^{4}	6	6
(Ukraine) E Svitolina	7^{7}	4	1

Quarterfinals
3	(Italy) S Errani	6	2	1
Q	(Switzerland) B Bencic	4	6	6

=== Bottom half ===
==== Section 3 ====
First round
Q	(China) S Zheng	2	6	5
(Kazakhstan) Y Shvedova	6	3	7
(Germany) J Görges	0	7	2
(France) V Razzano	6	5	6
(Sweden) J Larsson	2	3
9	(Czech Republic) L Šafářová	6	6
14	(Germany) A Petkovic	6^{2}	6	6
Q	(Ukraine) L Tsurenko	7^{7}	4	1
(Spain) A Medina Garrigues	3	2
(Spain) L Domínguez Lino	6	6
(United States) V King	4	7	6
(Israel) J Glushko	6	5	3

Second round
7	(Australia) S Stosur	6	5	6
(Kazakhstan) Y Shvedova	3	7	1
(France) V Razzano	6	4	4
9	(Czech Republic) L Šafářová	2	6	6
14	(Germany) A Petkovic	6	6
(Spain) L Domínguez Lino	0	0
(United States) V King	5	6	3
4	(Germany) S Lisicki	7	4	6

Third round
7	(Australia) S Stosur	6	4	4
9	(Czech Republic) L Šafářová	3	6	6
14	(Germany) A Petkovic	6	6
4	(Germany) S Lisicki	1	0

Quarterfinals
9	(Czech Republic) L Šafářová	3	6	1
14	(Germany) A Petkovic	6	1	6

==== Section 4 ====
First round
(United States) C McHale	3	5
Q	(Russia) A Kudryavtseva	6	7
(United States) A Riske	6	2	3
(South Africa) C Scheepers	4	6	6
(Czech Republic) B Záhlavová-Strýcová	3	6	5
11	(United States) V Williams	6	0	7
16	(China) S Zhang	3	7^{7}	7^{7}
(Chinese Taipei) S-w Hsieh	6	6^{5}	6^{0}
(Switzerland) S Vögele	7^{7}	1	5
(Croatia) A Tomljanović	6^{4}	6	7
(Germany) D Pfizenmaier	1	4
(United States) L Davis	6	6

Second round
6	(Canada) E Bouchard	6	6
Q	(Russia) A Kudryavtseva	2	0
(South Africa) C Scheepers	5	5
11	(United States) V Williams	7	7
16	(China) S Zhang	6	6^{4}	3
(Croatia) A Tomljanović	4	7^{7}	6
(United States) L Davis	0	3
2	(Serbia) J Janković	6	6

Third round
6	(Canada) E Bouchard	7^{8}	2	6
11	(United States) V Williams	6^{6}	6	4
(Croatia) A Tomljanović	5	1
2	(Serbia) J Janković	7	6

Quarterfinals
6	(Canada) E Bouchard	6	4	6
2	(Serbia) J Janković	3	6	3

== Qualifying ==
=== Seeds ===
1. (Kazakhstan) Zarina Diyas (qualifying competition)
2. (Spain) Estrella Cabeza Candela (qualifying competition, retired)
3. (Russia) Alla Kudryavtseva (qualified)
4. (Portugal) Michelle Larcher de Brito (qualified)
5. (Belarus) Aliaksandra Sasnovich (qualifying competition)
6. (United States) Victoria Duval (qualifying competition)
7. (Switzerland) Belinda Bencic (qualified)
8. (France) Alizé Lim (first round)
9. (France) Mathilde Johansson (qualifying competition)
10. (Montenegro) Danka Kovinić (first round)
11. (Netherlands) Kiki Bertens (qualified)
12. (China) Zheng Saisai (qualified)
13. (United States) Madison Brengle (qualifying competition)
14. (Ukraine) Lesia Tsurenko (qualified)
15. (Kazakhstan) Sesil Karatantcheva (qualifying competition)
16. (Austria) Tamira Paszek (first round)

=== Qualifiers ===
1. (United States) Grace Min
2. (China) Zheng Saisai
3. (Russia) Alla Kudryavtseva
4. (Portugal) Michelle Larcher de Brito
5. (Ukraine) Lesia Tsurenko
6. (Netherlands) Kiki Bertens
7. (Switzerland) Belinda Bencic
8. (Australia) Jarmila Gajdošová

=== Qualifying draw ===
==== First qualifier ====
First round					Qualifying competition
					1	(Kazakhstan) Zarina Diyas	1	2
	(United States) Grace Min	6	6^{3}	6		(United States) Grace Min	6	6
10	(Montenegro) Danka Kovinić	4	7^{7}	2

==== Second qualifier ====
First round					Qualifying competition
					2	(Spain) Estrella Cabeza Candela	2	0^{r}
	(Australia) Anastasia Rodionova	6	3	4	12	(China) Zheng Saisai	6	1
12	(China) Zheng Saisai	4	6	6

==== Third qualifier ====
First round
3	(Russia) Alla Kudryavtseva	2	6	7
(Spain) Arantxa Parra Santonja	6	4	5
(United States) Sanaz Marand	6	2	1
15	(Kazakhstan) Sesil Karatantcheva	3	6	6

Qualifying competition
3	(Russia) Alla Kudryavtseva	5	6	6
15	(Kazakhstan) Sesil Karatantcheva	7	3	2

==== Fourth qualifier ====
First round
4	(Portugal) Michelle Larcher de Brito	4	6	6
WC	(United States) Jennifer Elie	6	1	2
WC	(Poland) Alicja Rosolska	2	6^{3}
13	(United States) Madison Brengle	6	7^{7}

Qualifying competition
4	(Portugal) Michelle Larcher de Brito	7	5	7^{7}
13	(United States) Madison Brengle	5	7	6^{3}

==== Fifth qualifier ====
First round
5	(Belarus) Aliaksandra Sasnovich	7	6
(Slovenia) Petra Rampre	5	1
WC	(United States) Alexandra Mueller	0	2
14	(Ukraine) Lesia Tsurenko	6	6

Qualifying competition
5	(Belarus) Aliaksandra Sasnovich	3	3
14	(Ukraine) Lesia Tsurenko	6	6

==== Sixth qualifier ====
First round
6	(United States) Victoria Duval	6	6
WC	(United States) Ellie Halbauer	2	2
(Ukraine) Olga Savchuk	4	2
11	(Netherlands) Kiki Bertens	6	6

Qualifying competition
6	(United States) Victoria Duval	4	5
11	(Netherlands) Kiki Bertens	6	7

==== Seventh qualifier ====
First round
7	(Switzerland) Belinda Bencic	6	6
WC	(Chinese Taipei) Chan Yung-jan	3	3
(United States) Louisa Chirico	1	4
9	(France) Mathilde Johansson	6	6

Qualifying competition
7	(Switzerland) Belinda Bencic	7	2	6
9	(France) Mathilde Johansson	5	6	4

==== Eighth qualifier ====
First round
8	(France) Alizé Lim	4	6	4
WC	(United States) Taylor Townsend	6	2	6
(Australia) Jarmila Gajdošová	6	7^{7}
16	(Austria) Tamira Paszek	3	6^{5}

Qualifying competition
WC	(United States) Taylor Townsend	4	7^{7}	3
(Australia) Jarmila Gajdošová	6	6^{5}	6
