= Jaklin Alawi =

Bulgarian tennis player

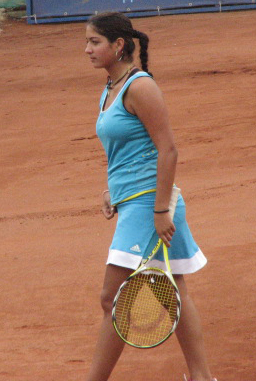
- Country (sports): Bulgaria
- Born: 28 December 1990 (age 34)
- Plays: Right-handed
- Prize money: US$ 6,761

Singles
- Career record: 15–12
- Career titles: 0 WTA, 0 ITF
- Highest ranking: No. 895 (20 October 2008)

Doubles
- Career record: 6–15
- Career titles: 0 WTA, 0 ITF
- Highest ranking: No. 914 (23 June 2008)

Team competitions
- Fed Cup: 0–2 (doubles 0-2)

Jaklin Alawi (born 28 December 1990) is a former professional tennis player from Bulgaria.

== Biography ==
A right-handed player from Sofia, Alawi competed on the professional ITF circuit while a junior, from 2005 to 2008.

Alawi featured in two ties for the Bulgaria Fed Cup team, against Great Britain and Poland in 2007, both times partnering Dessislava Mladenova.

In 2009 she left the tour to play and attend college in the United States, first at Long Beach State, then the University of South Carolina.

While in South Carolina, Alawi and her college teammate Dominika Kaňáková received a wildcard to compete in the doubles at the 2013 Family Circle Cup, which was her only WTA Tour main draw appearance.

== ITF Circuit finals ==
=== Singles: 1 (1 runner–up) ===
Legend $100,000 tournaments $75,000 tournaments $50,000 tournaments $25,000 tournaments $10,000 tournaments	Finals by surface Hard (0–1) Clay (0–0) Grass (0–0) Carpet (0–0)

Result	W–L	Date	Tournament	Tier	Surface	Opponent	Score
Loss	0–1	Jul 2008	ITF Damascus, Syria	10,000	Hard	(Portugal) Magali de Lattre	5–7, 2–6

== Fed Cup ==
Jaklin Alawi debuted for the Bulgaria Fed Cup team in 2017. Since then, she has a 0–0 singles record and a 0–2 doubles record (0–2 overall).

=== Doubles (0–2) ===
Edition	Round	Date	Partner	Against	Surface	Opponents	W/L	Result
2007 Europe/Africa Group I	RR	18 April 2007	(Bulgaria) Dessislava Mladenova	Great Britain	Clay	(United Kingdom) Elena Baltacha (United Kingdom) Claire Curran	L	4–6, 2–6
2007 Europe/Africa Group I	RR	19 April 2007	(Bulgaria) Dessislava Mladenova	Poland	Clay	(Poland) Marta Domachowska (Poland) Klaudia Jans-Ignacik	L	0–6, 3–6

- RR = Round Robin
