= Zhang Shuai =

Chinese tennis player (born 1989)

Zhang Shuai 张帅
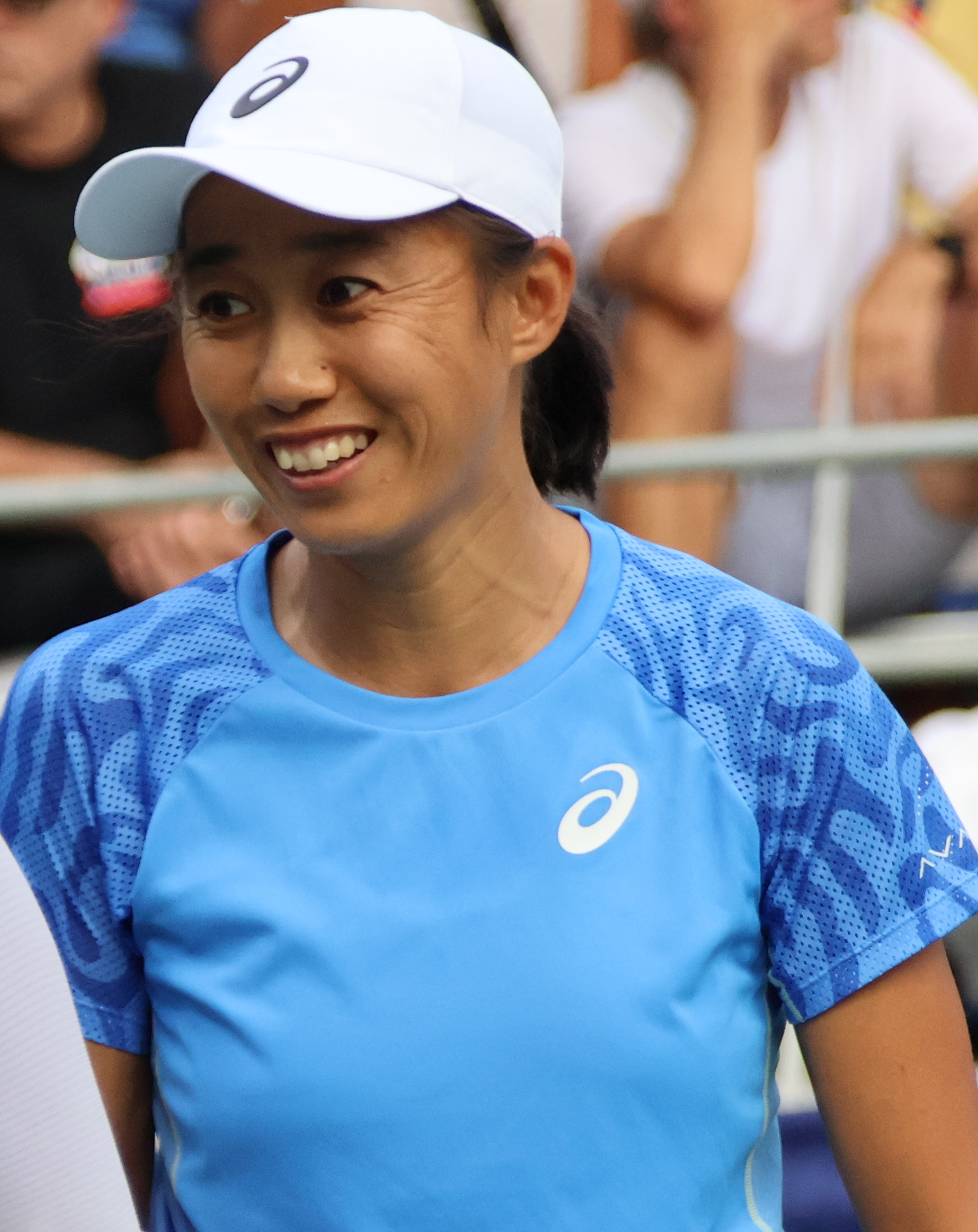
- Zhang at the 2025 DC Open
- Country (sports): China
- Residence: Tianjin, China
- Born: 21 January 1989 (age 37) Tianjin, China
- Height: 1.77 m (5 ft 10 in)
- Turned pro: 2003
- Plays: Right (two-handed backhand)
- Coach: Liu Shuo
- Prize money: US$ 13,601,287
- Official website: zhang-shuai.com

Singles
- Career record: 618–466
- Career titles: 3
- Highest ranking: No. 22 (16 January 2023)
- Current ranking: No. 93 (26 October 2026)

Grand Slam singles results
- Australian Open: QF (2016)
- French Open: 4R (2020)
- Wimbledon: QF (2019)
- US Open: 4R (2022)

Other tournaments
- Olympic Games: 2R (2016)

Doubles
- Career record: 437–325
- Career titles: 19
- Highest ranking: No. 2 (11 July 2022)
- Current ranking: No. 7 (10 August 2026)

Grand Slam doubles results
- Australian Open: W (2019, 2026)
- French Open: QF (2019)
- Wimbledon: F (2022)
- US Open: W (2021)

Other doubles tournaments
- Tour Finals: SF (2019)
- Olympic Games: 2R (2016)

Grand Slam mixed doubles results
- Australian Open: SF (2022)
- French Open: SF (2025)
- Wimbledon: SF (2021, 2025, 2026)
- US Open: SF (2018, 2022)

Team competitions
- Fed Cup: 13–9
Medal record
Women's tennis
Representing China
Asian Games
Gold medal – first place	2010 Guangzhou	Team event
Silver medal – second place	2014 Incheon	Team event
Silver medal – second place	2018 Jakarta-Palembang	Singles
Silver medal – second place	2026 Aichi-Nagoya	Singles
East Asian Games
Silver medal – second place	2009 Hong Kong	Singles
Bronze medal – third place	2009 Hong Kong	Doubles
- Last updated on: 21 August 2026.

Zhang Shuai
- Simplified Chinese: 张帅
- Traditional Chinese: 張帥
Transcriptions
Standard Mandarin
- Hanyu Pinyin: Zhāng Shuài
- IPA: [ʈʂáŋ ʂwâɪ]

Zhang Shuai (Chinese: 张帅; pinyin: Zhāng Shuài; Mandarin pronunciation: [ʈʂáŋ ʂwâɪ]; born 21 January 1989) is a Chinese professional tennis player. She has a career-high doubles ranking of world No. 2, achieved in July 2022, and a singles ranking of No. 22, reached in January 2023. She is a three-time Grand Slam tournament champion in women's doubles, having won the 2019 Australian Open and the 2021 US Open alongside Samantha Stosur, and the 2026 Australian Open partnering Elise Mertens.

Zhang also finished runner-up at the 2022 Wimbledon Championships and 2024 US Open, and has reached six further semifinals across women's and mixed doubles. She has won a total of 14 doubles titles on the WTA Tour, including the 2021 Cincinnati Open with Stosur. Zhang has also qualified for the WTA Finals on two occasions.

She has also enjoyed success in singles winning three WTA Tour singles titles, at the Guangzhou International in 2013 and 2017, and the 2022 Lyon Open, and finished runner-up at three further tournaments. She has reached two major quarterfinals, at the 2016 Australian Open and 2019 Wimbledon Championships. Alongside Li Na, Zheng Jie, Peng Shuai, Wang Qiang and Zheng Qinwen, Zhang is one of only six Chinese tennis players to have reached this stage at a major. She has represented China in the Billie Jean King Cup since 2009, and also competed at the 2012, 2016 and 2024 Olympic Games.

== Career ==
Zhang, born in Tianjin, started playing tennis at the age of six, when her parents took her to a local tennis club.

She turned professional in 2003 and played her first singles event in Mollerusa in August of that year. After defeating Matilde Munoz-Gonzalves in the first qualifying round, she lost to Laura Figuerola-Foix. After a full year on the ITF Women's Circuit, Zhang finished 2004 with a year-end ranking of 901st.

She enjoyed considerable success in singles on ITF tournaments, having won one $50k event, eight $25k and three $10k events between 2006 and 2009. As of October 2009, however, she had won only two main-draw tournaments on the WTA Tour. However, she won her first singles title at the 2013 Guangzhou Open as a wildcard entrant.

=== 2012: Olympics debut in doubles ===
Zhang started her year at the Blossom Cup in Quanzhou. She defeated Nudnida Luangnam and Anna Floris in the first and second rounds, respectively, before falling to Tímea Babos in the quarterfinals. At the Australian Open, she had received a wildcard and was beaten by Aleksandra Wozniak in the first round, in straight sets. It was her seventh first-round loss in a major tournament.

At the Monterrey Open, she lost to Gréta Arn in the first round. Next, Zhang went to Indian Wells to play at the Open where she was a qualifier. She lost to Simona Halep in the first round. At the French Open, she lost in the first round to Angelique Kerber.

Zhang competed at the London Olympics tournament in the women's doubles with Li Na, reaching the second round.

=== 2013: First WTA Tour title ===
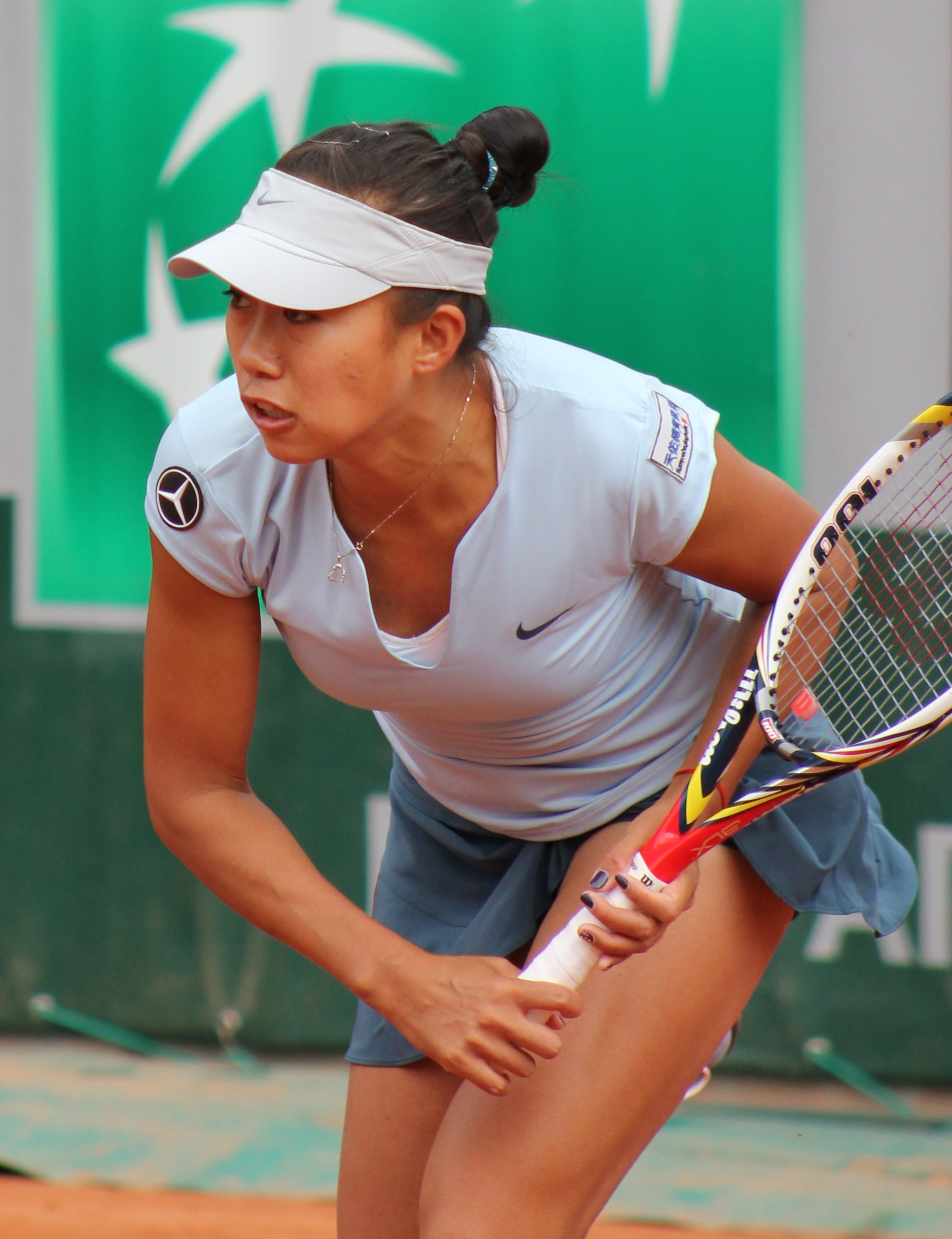
Zhang at the 2013 French Open

Started the year as the top-seed at the ITF tournament Innisbrook Open in Florida on clay with a first-round loss to 468th ranked wildcard Asia Muhammad. Skipping the Australian Open and remaining in Florida for another ITF clay-court tournament, the $25k Tesoro Open in Port St. Lucie losing to 214th ranked and fourth seed Tadeja Majerič in the semifinal. In doubles, she and partner Sharon Fichman were seeded second and lost in the quarterfinals to the eventual winners, qualifiers Angelina Gabueva & Allie Will. Zhang entered three WTA Tour tournaments and played doubles with Janette Husárová: as the third seed in the qualifying draw, lost to 647th ranked Abigail Spears in the first round of the qualifier in the Qatar Open in Doha and lost to Lisa Raymond & Samantha Stosur in second round; lost to 61st ranked Anabel Medina Garrigues in the second round of qualifying in the Dubai Tennis Championships and lost to Julia Görges & Angelique Kerber in straight sets in the first round. and lost to 23rd and second seeded Hsieh Su-wei in the second round of the Malaysian Open and lost to second seeded team of Shuko Aoyama and Chang Kai-chen in an exciting final. Returning stateside losing to 131st ranked wildcard Bethanie Mattek-Sands in the qualifying final of the Miami Open, teaming up with Megan Moulton-Levy, lost in the second round to third seeded Nadia Petrova and Katarina Srebotnik. Zhang lost to Petra Rampre (No. 282) in the first qualifying round as the seventh seed in the Charleston Open. Zhang & Moulton-Levy were beaten in the semifinal by the top-seeded team of Andrea Hlaváčková & Liezel Huber. Playing as the fifth seed in the $25k Challenger in Pelham, Alabama, she lost to the 197th ranked Ashleigh Barty, in the second round. Playing in her first final as the eighth seed at the Dothan Pro Classic, she lost to Ajla Tomljanović (No. 171). As the seventh seed at the ITF Charlottesville, she lost to 381st ranked wildcard player Allie Will in the first round.

Zhang entered the doubles draw of the Madrid Open with Zheng Jie as the seventh seeded team, they lost in the first round to Kristina Mladenovic & Galina Voskoboeva. In Rome, she lost to the fifth-seeded Madison Keys (No. 60) at the Italian Open in the first qualifying round. Again partnering with Zheng, the eighth-seeded team lost to Dominika Cibulková & Monica Niculescu in the opening round. Zhang entered the French Open doubles with Zheng as No. 13, losing to the second-seeded team of Andrea Hlaváčková and Lucie Hradecká in the third round. She also entered the mixed-doubles tournament with Julian Knowle, losing in the second round to the fifth-seeded team of Kristina Mladenovic & Daniel Nestor. She then played in the National Games of China in Dalian with team members Duan Yingying, Peng Shuai and Zheng Saisai representing Tianjin in the team competition winning the gold medal over Team Shanghai. Zhang entered Wimbledon doubles with Moulton-Levy losing to the 12th seeded team of Ashleigh Barty & Casey Dellacqua in the second round. She entered the mixed-doubles tournament once again with Knowle losing in the first round to Barty & John Peers. At the Beijing Challenger, she, as the third seed, made her second final of the year beating the top-seed Misaki Doi. In the final, she defeated the fourth-seeded Zhou Yimiao winning her first title since 31 May 2010, at the Infond Open in Maribor. Zhang competed at the National Games of China in Dalian for the individual finals in the end of July. Playing as the third seed, she lost in the second round (after receiving a bye) to 728th ranked Zhang Kailin. In the doubles tournament, as the top seed with Peng, she won the gold medal in a walkover when the second team from Tianjin, Xu Yifan and Zheng Saisai withdrew because of Zheng's injury from her semifinal singles match.

Zhang entered the Suzhou Ladies Open as the fourth seed, and lost to the unranked Zheng Saisai (No. 195) in the quarterfinal. At the Cincinnati Open doubles event, she lost with Irina-Camelia Begu in the first round to Vera Dushevina and Sílvia Soler Espinosa. Then, she entered the qualifying event at New Haven. After beating the 12th seeded Johanna Larsson in the first round, she lost to eventual qualifier Anna Karolína Schmiedlová in the second round. Seeded fifth at the qualifying event for the US Open, she defeated Julie Coin in the first round but lost to CoCo Vandeweghe (No. 192) in second. She entered the doubles tournament with Yaroslava Shvedova losing to Alla Kudryavtseva & Anastasia Rodionova in the first round. At the ITF event in Sanya, China as the second seed, she lost to Zheng Saisai in straight sets in the first round. Zhang entered the Guangzhou International Open as a wildcard, winning her first WTA Tour singles title over qualifier Vania King (No. 124). She also entered the doubles tournament with Shvedova losing in the first round to the fourth-seeded team of Tímea Babos & Olga Govortsova. At the Ningbo International Open, she lost in the final round to the top seeded Bojana Jovanovski. She entered the doubles competition with Chan Yung-jan winning the title over the fourth-seeded team of Irina Buryachok & Oksana Kalashnikova. As a wildcard at the China Open in Beijing, she lost to tenth seed Roberta Vinci, in three sets in the second round. She received a wildcard in the doubles tournament with Shvedova, losing to Chan Yung-jan and Zheng Jie in the first round in three sets.

Zhang played at the Japan Women's Open in Osaka losing to the sixth seed Madison Keys in the second round. She entered the doubles tournament with Sam Stosur losing in straight sets to the second seeded team of Kristina Mladenovic & Flavia Pennetta in the final. At the Nanjing Ladies Open, as the third seed, she won her third title of the year beating the fourth seed Ayumi Morita in match shortened by retirement after one set. Zhang also reached the final in doubles with Shvedova as the top-seeded team losing to Misaki Doi and Xu Yifan, in straight sets. She reached No. 51 as a career-high in singles on 4 November 2013. She entered the Taipei Open on carpet as the third seed, and lost in the first round to Katarzyna Piter (No. 122), retiring after first game in the second set being down a set. and played in the doubles competition with Kimiko Date-Krumm as the top-seeded team; they lost to the team of Misaki Doi & Hsieh Shu-ying in the first round, in three sets.

=== 2014: Mixed results ===
Zhang started the season at the Shenzhen Open as the sixth seed losing to Chan Yung-jan in the first round, and played in the doubles tournament with Zheng Saisai as the top seeds, losing in the quarterfinal round to Monica Niculescu & Klára Zakopalová. Next, in the Hobart International, she lost to the seventh-seeded Zakopalová in the second round. She reached the doubles final with Lisa Raymond as the second seeded team losing again to Niculescu & Zakopalová in a match decided in a super tiebreak. Zhang's winless streak in the Grand Slam tournaments reached nine as she had a disappointing opening-round loss to Mona Barthel in the Australian Open.

She also lost in first round with Kimiko Date-Krumm in doubles against the seventh-seeded team of Andrea Hlaváčková & Lucie Šafářová. She suffered another first-round lost to the wildcard and second seed Svetlana Kuznetsova in the Pattaya Open. After being three games from losing the doubles finals in the second, she and partner Peng Shuai as the fourth-seeded team rallied back to defeat the third-seeded Kudryavtseva & Rodionova in a thrilling match decided by a super tiebreak. In early February, Zhang competed in the Fed Cup for China in Astana. Partnering with Liu Fangzhou, Zhang lost the deciding doubles match against Uzbekistan's Nigina Abduraimova & Sabina Sharipova in the first round-robin match. She teamed with Peng Shuai in a straight-set victory against South Korea's team of Han Na-lae & Yoo Mi in the second match. In the third round, she beat Juan Ting-fei from Taiwan in the second singles rubber and teamed with Wang Qiang to defeat the team of Juan & Lee Ya-hsuan. Later in the same month, Zhang lost to qualifier Petra Cetkovská in the second round of the Qatar Open. In the doubles competition with Lisa Raymond, she lost in straight sets to the top-seeded team of Sara Errani & Roberta Vinci in the second round. She failed to qualify for the Dubai Tennis Championships. Playing as the eighth seed, she lost to Karolína Plíšková in the second round of qualifying. Partnering with Lisa Raymond, she lost in the second round of the doubles draw against Hlaváčková & Šafářová. At the Mexican Open as the eighth seed, she reached the semifinals only to retire because of her shoulder to top-seeded Dominika Cibulková after six games. Partnered with Chuang Chia-jung, she lost to the second seeds Kristina Mladenovic & Galina Voskoboeva in the quarterfinal. At Indian Wells, Zhang was eliminated by Mladenovic in the first round, and withdrew from the doubles because of injury. At the Miami Open, she suffered another first-round loss, this time against Lauren Davis. Zhang then also withdrew from the Oaks Club Challenger.

She began clay-court season at the Charleston Open as the 16th seed losing to Ajla Tomljanović in the second round, but reached the semifinals at the Malaysian Open as the second seed losing to the seventh seed and eventual winner, Donna Vekić. As the seventh seed, she lost to Polona Hercog in the first round at the Morocco Open. At the Portugal Open, she lost to seventh seed Svetlana Kuznetsova in the first round. and reached the quarterfinals with Sílvia Soler Espinosa losing to the top-seeded team of Cara Black & Sania Mirza. Another first-round loss came at Madrid against wildcard entrant Irina-Camelia Begu. Partnering with Janette Husárová, Zhang lost to the eighth-seeded team of Julia Görges and Anna-Lena Grönefeld in the first round. She defeated Petra Kvitová in the second round of the Italian Open, in three sets. She recorded a total of 300 wins and her second top-10 victory. She lost to Serena Williams in the quarterfinals. She entered the doubles with Monica Niculescu but withdrew with a shoulder injury against Casey Dellacqua & Klaudia Jans-Ignacik, in the second round. Zhang also withdrew from the Internationaux de Strasbourg. Her winless streak in major events reached ten as she lost to third seed Agnieszka Radwańska at Roland Garros, in two sets. She entered the doubles draw with Ajla Tomljanović but lost to Gabriela Dabrowski & Alicja Rosolska in the first round.

Zhang began grass-court season at the Birmingham Classic as No. 9 seed, losing to the top-seeded and eventual champion, Ana Ivanovic, in the semifinal. Played in the doubles competition with Caroline Garcia losing to the second-seeded team of Ashleigh Barty & Casey Dellacqua in the semifinal round. Lost at the Eastbourne International to Varvara Lepchenko in the first round. She suffered another first-round loss at Wimbledon against 15th seed Carla Suárez Navarro in straight sets, and her losing streak reached eleven. Partnering with Yanina Wickmayer in doubles, lost to the 11th-seeded team of Alla Kudryavtseva & Anastasia Rodionova in the first round. She then entered the mixed doubles with Nicholas Monroe, losing to the 13th-seeded team of Bruno Soares & Martina Hingis in the second round.

Zhang withdrew from the Baku Cup and started preparing for the US Open at the San Jose Classic, but lost to qualifier Sachia Vickery in the first round. Along with Caroline Garcia, she was beaten by the third-seeded team of Garbiñe Muguruza & Carla Suárez Navarro in the quarterfinals. She suffered another first-round loss at the Canadian Open against CoCo Vandeweghe. Zhang played doubles with Samantha Stosur losing against the sixth-seeded team of Raquel Kops-Jones & Abigail Spears in the first round. At the Cincinnati Open, she lost in the second round to 12th-seeded Caroline Wozniacki. She was scheduled to play doubles with Stosur again, but withdrew with an injured right arm. The Grand Slam tournament losing-streak reached twelve as she lost to Mona Barthel in the first round at the US Open, seeded 32nd.

In September, Zhang withdrew from the Hong Kong Open and Guangzhou Open. She played in the Asian Games in the team event with Duan Yingying, Zheng Jie and Zheng Saisai. Zhang won her quarterfinal singles and doubles (with Zheng Jie) matches, but dropped the deciding doubles match in the final, earning a silver medal. She lost in the first round to Caroline Garcia at the China Open, and played in the doubles with Samantha Stosur losing to Jarmila Gajdošová & Ajla Tomljanović in the first round.

=== 2016: First major singles quarterfinal ===
Zhang started new season at the Shenzhen Open where she beat fellow wildcard Irina Khromacheva in straight sets, before losing to top-seed and eventual champion, Agnieszka Radwańska, in the second round.

Prior to the Australian Open, Zhang was contemplating retirement due to a lack of success in majors, having not won a match in a main draw in 14 attempts. She qualified for the main draw by beating Mandy Minella, Tereza Martincová and Virginie Razzano. In the first round, Zhang caused a huge upset by defeating world No. 2, Simona Halep, in straight sets, finally ending her drought on the 15th attempt. Both her and her coach were seen in tears during the time between the match and the on-court interview, as well as the interview itself, where Zhang broke down in tears of joy. Following subsequent victories over Alizé Cornet and Varvara Lepchenko, she then proceeded to reach the fourth round where she defeated an injured Madison Keys in three sets and proceeded to the quarterfinals where she was defeated by Johanna Konta in straight sets. She became the fourth ever Chinese player to reach a major quarterfinal after Li Na, Zheng Jie and Peng Shuai. This run earnt her the Breakthrough Performance of the Month Award by WTA for January, as she received 44% of the votes in a poll on the official WTA website. She also moved 68 places up the rankings, from 133rd to 65th, thus becoming the new Chinese No. 1.

In February, Zhang returned to the ITF Circuit in Rancho Santa Fe. She won five matches to claim the Morgan Run Women's Open title, culminating in a three-set victory over Vania King. At the 2016 Olympics, she competed in both the singles and doubles (with Peng). She reached the second round in both events. Zhang finished her breakthrough year with a career-high ranking of 23.

=== 2017–18: Second career title ===
In September 2017, she won her second WTA Tour title at the Guangzhou Open. Seeded second, she reached the final without dropping a set and defeated the unseeded Aleksandra Krunić in the final in three sets to win the title for the second time.

In 2018, Zhang reached the semifinals in Prague and Hiroshima. After defeating Angelique Kerber, she lost to Naomi Osaka in the quarterfinals of China Open where she won the first set. She also triumphed in doubles in Istanbul and Hiroshima, partnering Liang Chen and Eri Hozumi, respectively.

=== 2019: Australian doubles title and top 10, Wimbledon singles quarterfinal ===
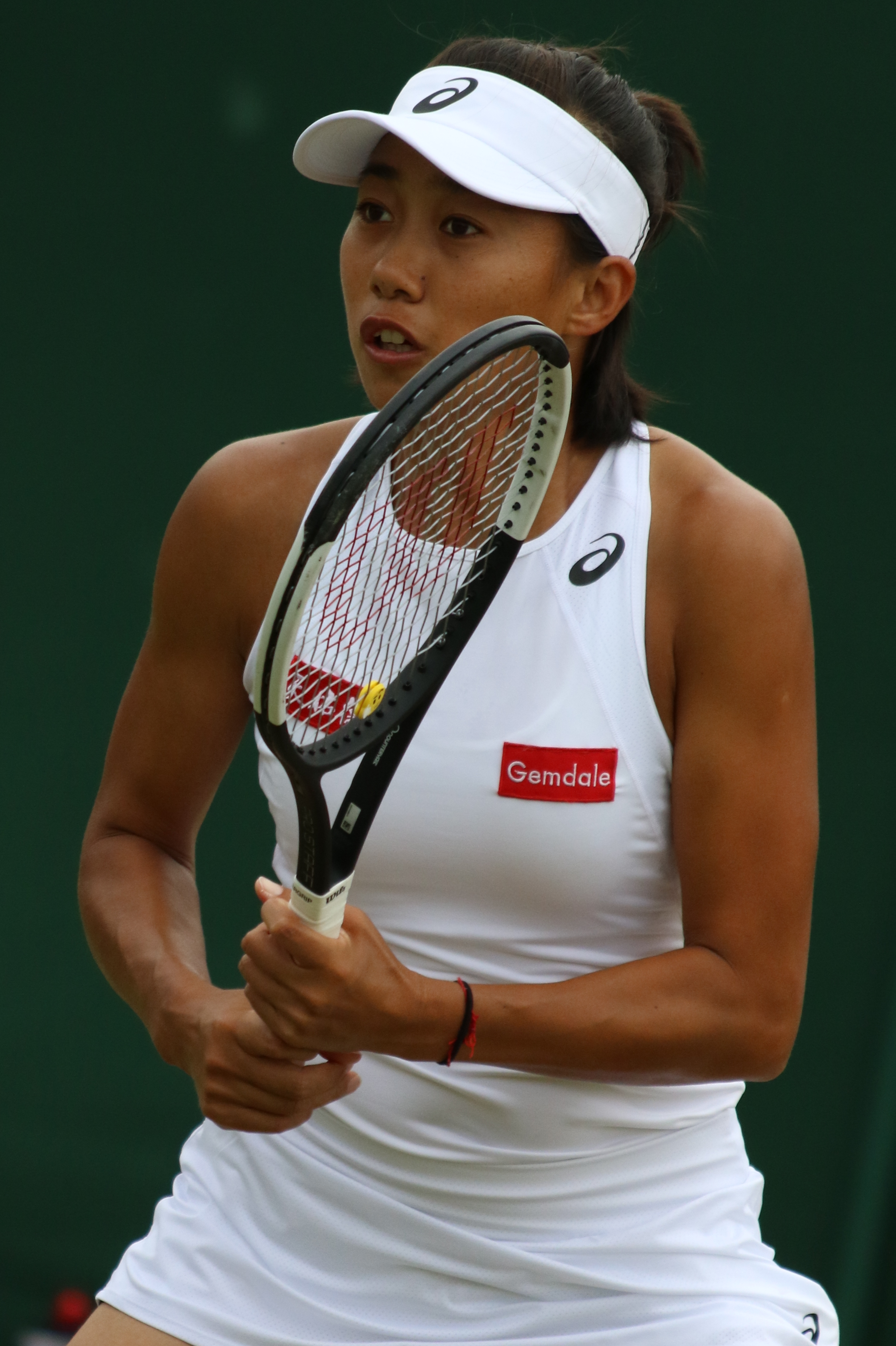
Zhang at the 2019 Wimbledon Championships

Zhang won the biggest doubles title of her career at the Australian Open. With home-favorite Sam Stosur, she won her maiden major doubles title, upsetting defending champions, Tímea Babos and Kristina Mladenovic, in straight sets. She became the fourth player from mainland China to win a major women's doubles title, after Zheng Jie, Yan Zi and Peng Shuai.

The pair also reached the final at Miami, where they lost to Elise Mertens and Aryna Sabalenka, in straight sets. She made her top-10 debut in doubles on 13 May 2019.

At Wimbledon, Zhang reached the second quarterfinal of a major singles event of her career, before losing to seventh seed and eventual champion Simona Halep in straight sets.

=== 2020–21: French Open singles 4th round, US Open & WTA 1000 doubles titles ===
She reached the fourth round of the 2020 French Open for the first time in her career where she lost to seventh seed Petra Kvitová.

She won the WTA 1000 2021 Cincinnati Open and the 2021 US Open titles in doubles, partnering Sam Stosur.

She finished the year ranked No. 8 in doubles, the highest ranking and year-end finish of her career.

=== 2022: Singles title, Wimbledon doubles final & world No. 2 ===
She reached the third round in singles at the Australian Open and the second round in doubles with her regular partner Stosur who announced she was playing the last year of her career. She also reached the semifinals in mixed doubles for the first time at this major with another Australian John Peers.

Zhang entered the Lyon Open as the eighth seed. She beat Kristina Mladenovic, Arantxa Rus, Vitalia Diatchenko and Caroline Garcia to reach the final. Then she defeated wildcard Dayana Yastremska to win her first title since 2017 and third overall. At the Miami Open, she reached the third round in singles in which she lost in a close match to Coco Gauff.

She reached a career-high ranking of world No. 5 in doubles on 11 April 2022, following her participation at the Charleston Open where she reached semifinals with Caroline Dolehide.

Partnering Caty McNally at the French Open, she reached the third round. As a result, she set a new career-high ranking in doubles, at world No. 3 on 13 June 2022.

Zhang won the doubles tournament title at the WTA 250 Nottingham Open playing alongside Beatriz Haddad Maia and defeating Caroline Dolehide and Monica Niculescu in the final, in two sets.

At the WTA 250 Birmingham Classic, Zhang was runner-up playing against Haddad Maia, after retiring from the match in the first set due to a back injury, when the score was 5–4 for Haddad.

At Wimbledon, she reached the final for the first time at this major, partnering Elise Mertens. She also reached a career-high of world No. 2 in the doubles rankings, on 11 July 2022.

Zhang lost in the second round of the Canadian Open to eventual winner Simona Halep. At the Western & Southern Open in Cincinnati, she made the quarterfinals. At the US Open, Zhang became the oldest from all the four Chinese female players that reached the fourth round at this major but lost to Coco Gauff in a thrilling match lasting almost two hours. With this result, she made the second week at all four majors.

=== 2023–24: Injury, China Open singles quarterfinal ===
Zhang was the doubles champion of the 2023 Abu Dhabi Open, a WTA 500 tournament. Partnering Luisa Stefani, they defeated Shuko Aoyama and Chan Hao-ching at the final in three sets.

Zhang withdrew from the 2023 US Open in singles and doubles. Following the tournament she dropped out of the top 100 in singles.

In doubles, Zhang returned to the WTA Tour at the 2024 Dubai Open where she partnered Anna Danilina. She reached the final at the 2024 US Open with Kristina Mladenovic defeating en route they second seeds Hsieh Su-wei and Elise Mertens, in the first round. They lost the final to Jeļena Ostapenko and Lyudmyla Kichenok.

In singles, at the 2024 Korea Open, she increased her losing streak in singles to 24, after falling to Veronika Kudermetova in the first round, making her the second-placed woman record holder in the Open Era (after Madeleine Pegel with 29).

Ranked No. 595 at the 2024 China Open, she finally recorded a win over McCartney Kessler, her first since 31 January 2023, snapping her record losing singles streak. With her second-round win over sixth seed Emma Navarro, Zhang became the lowest ranked player to defeat a top 10 player since the inception of the tournament in 2004. With her straight sets wins over Greet Minnen and 23rd seed Magdalena Fręch, to reach her fifth career WTA 1000 quarterfinal, she moved back into the top 250 in the singles rankings, close to 350 positions up from the start of the tournament. She became the lowest-ranked player to reach the round of 16 at the tournament, and also only the fourth player ranked outside the top 500 to reach a WTA 1000-level quarterfinal.

Partnering Kateřina Siniaková, she won the doubles at the 2024 Guangzhou Open, defeating Katarzyna Piter and Fanny Stollár in the final.

=== 2025: WTA 500 doubles title ===
Partnering McCartney Kessler, Zhang was runner-up in the doubles at the ATX Open, losing to Anna Blinkova and Yuan Yue in the final. Alongside Ekaterina Alexandrova, she also reached the final at the Stuttgart Open but lost to top seeds Gabriela Dabrowski and Erin Routliffe.

Teaming with Taylor Townsend, Zhang won the doubles title at the Washington Open, defeating Caroline Dolehide and Sofia Kenin in the final. The pair were also runners-up at the Canadian Open, losing in the final to Coco Gauff and McCartney Kessler.

Given a wildcard entry into the singles main draw at the Guangzhou Open, Zhang defeated Anastasia Zakharova, Veronika Erjavec and qualifier Katie Volynets to reach the semifinals. She retired during the first set of her last four match against second seed and eventual champion, Ann Li, due to a hip injury.

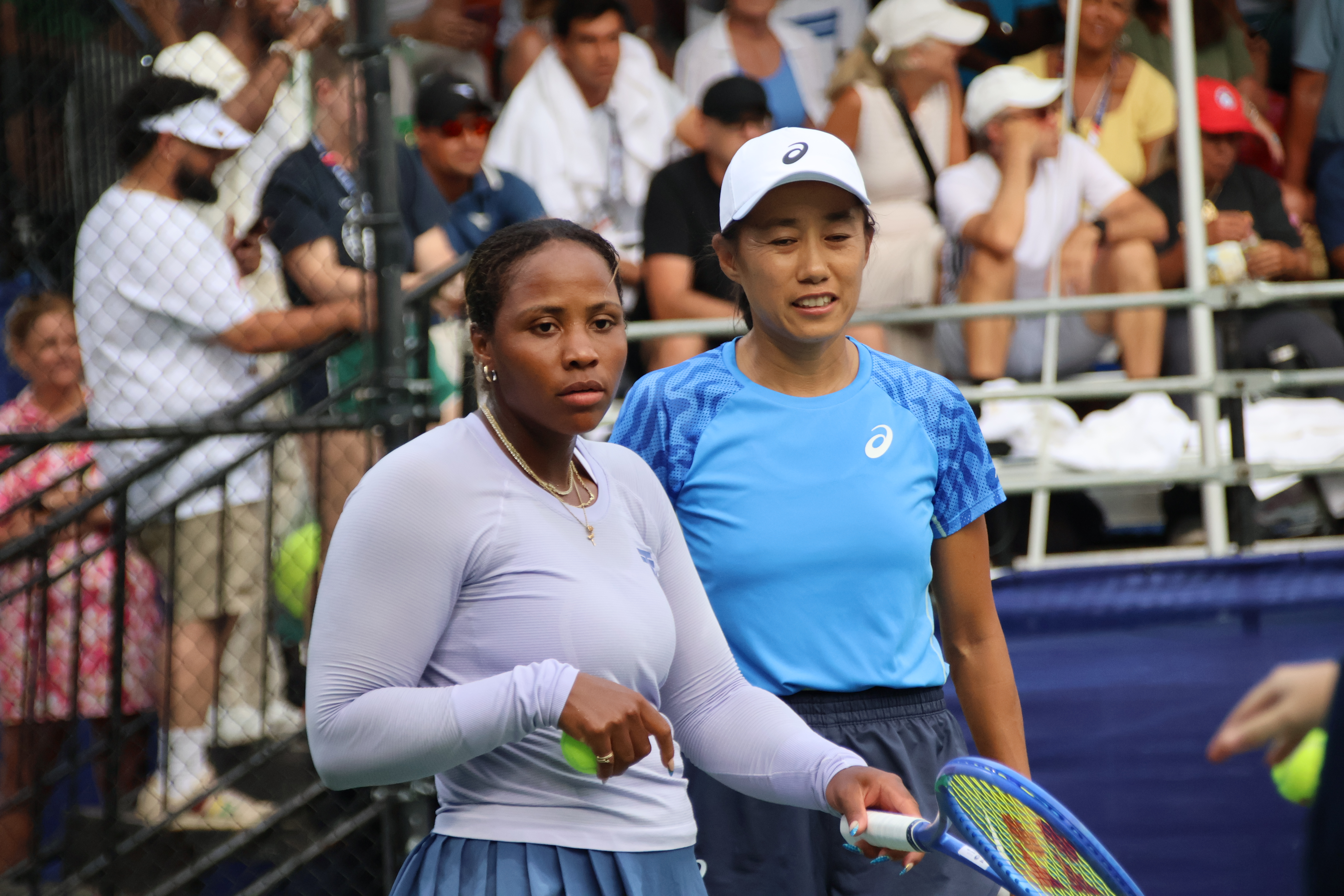
Zhang with Taylor Townsend at the 2025 Washington Open

=== 2026: Australian Open champion ===
Partnering with Kateřina Siniaková, Zhang won the doubles title at the Adelaide International, defeating Lyudmyla Kichenok and Desirae Krawczyk in the final.

At the Australian Open, she teamed up with Elise Martens to win the doubles title, overcoming Anna Danilina and Aleksandra Krunić in the final.

Having qualified for the main draw at the Mérida Open, Zhang recorded wins over Varvara Lepchenko, second seed and defending champion Emma Navarro and Victoria Jiménez Kasintseva to reach her first WTA Tour singles semifinal since 2022, at which point her run was ended by Magdalena Fręch.

In April at the Linz Open, she partnered with Sorana Cîrstea to win the doubles title, defeating Jesika Malečková and Miriam Škoch in the final. The following week, Zhang teamed up with Jeļena Ostapenko at the Stuttgart Open, where they reached the final but lost to Nicole Melichar-Martinez and Liudmila Samsonova.

Entering the main draw at the Strasbourg Open as a lucky loser, she defeated Cristina Bucșa and wildcard entrant Diane Parry, before losing to Emma Navarro in the quarterfinals.

== Personal life ==
Zhang is coached by Liu Shuo. Her parents are Zhang Zhiqiang (a former football player) and Wang Fengqin (a former basketball player). Her English name is Rose. According to fellow tennis players Coco Gauff and Heather Watson, Zhang is one of the nicest players on tour. She has spoken of opening a coffee bar when she retires.

== Career statistics ==
=== Grand Slam performance timelines ===
Key
W	F	SF	QF	#R	RR	Q#	DNQ	A	NH

(W) winner; (F) finalist; (SF) semifinalist; (QF) quarterfinalist; (#R) rounds 4, 3, 2, 1; (RR) round-robin stage; (Q#) qualification round; (DNQ) did not qualify; (A) absent; (NH) not held; (SR) strike rate (events won / competed); (W–L) win–loss record.
To avoid confusion and double counting, these charts are updated at the conclusion of a tournament or when the player's participation has ended.

==== Singles ====
Current through the 2026 US Open – Women's singles.

Tournament	2007	2008	2009	2010	2011	2012	2013	2014	2015	2016	2017	2018	2019	2020	2021	2022	2023	2024	2025	2026	SR	W–L	Win %
Australian Open	Q1	Q3	A	Q1	1R	1R	A	1R	1R	QF	2R	2R	3R	3R	1R	3R	4R	A	2R	1R	0 / 14	16–14	53%
French Open	A	Q2	A	1R	1R	1R	A	1R	1R	2R	3R	2R	2R	4R	1R	1R	1R	A	Q2	1R	0 / 14	8–14	36%
Wimbledon	A	A	A	Q2	1R	Q2	A	1R	Q3	1R	1R	1R	QF	NH	1R	3R	1R	1R	1R	2R	0 / 12	7–12	37%
US Open	Q2	1R	Q2	Q2	1R	Q3	Q2	1R	Q2	3R	3R	1R	3R	1R	2R	4R	A	1R	1R	1R	0 / 13	10–13	43%
Win–loss	0–0	0–1	0–0	0–1	0–4	0–2	0–0	0–4	0–2	7–4	5–4	2–4	9–4	5–3	1–4	7–4	3–3	0–2	1–3	1–4	0 / 53	41–53	44%
Career statistics
Titles	0	0	0	0	0	0	1	0	0	0	1	0	0	0	0	1	0	0	0	0	Career total: 3		
Finals	0	0	0	0	0	0	1	0	0	0	1	0	0	1	1	2	0	0	0	0	Career total: 6		
Year-end ranking	155	212	153	91	126	122	51	62	186	23	36	35	46	35	63	24	208	219	81		$12,438,096		

==== Doubles ====
Tournament	2010	2011	2012	2013	2014	2015	2016	2017	2018	2019	2020	2021	2022	2023	2024	2025	2026	SR	W–L	Win%
Australian Open	A	2R	1R	A	1R	1R	A	2R	A	W	1R	1R	2R	2R	A	QF	W	2 / 12	19–10	66%
French Open	A	2R	3R	3R	1R	A	1R	1R	1R	QF	3R	2R	3R	2R	1R	1R	3R	0 / 15	16–15	52%
Wimbledon	2R	3R	1R	2R	1R	A	2R	1R	1R	2R	NH	1R	F	SF	2R	3R	2R	0 / 15	19–15	56%
US Open	A	2R	QF	1R	A	A	2R	QF	SF	1R	1R	W	3R	A	F	3R	QF	1 / 13	30–12	69%
Win–loss	1–1	5–4	5–4	3–3	0–3	0–1	2–3	4–4	4–3	10–3	2–3	7–3	10–4	6–3	6–3	7–4	12–3	3 / 55	84–52	62%
Career statistics
Year-end ranking	158	49	34	57	63	447	234	64	33	10	27	8	25	34	27	16				

=== Grand Slam tournament finals ===
==== Doubles: 5 (3 titles, 2 runner-ups) ====
Result	Year	Tournament	Surface	Partner	Opponents	Score
Win	2019	Australian Open	Hard	(Australia) Samantha Stosur	(Hungary) Tímea Babos (France) Kristina Mladenovic	6–3, 6–4
Win	2021	US Open	Hard	(Australia) Samantha Stosur	(United States) Coco Gauff (United States) Caty McNally	6–3, 3–6, 6–3
Loss	2022	Wimbledon	Grass	(Belgium) Elise Mertens	(Czech Republic) Barbora Krejčíková (Czech Republic) Kateřina Siniaková	2–6, 4–6
Loss	2024	US Open	Hard	(France) Kristina Mladenovic	(Latvia) Jeļena Ostapenko (Ukraine) Lyudmyla Kichenok	4–6, 3–6
Win	2026	Australian Open (2)	Hard	(Belgium) Elise Mertens	(Kazakhstan) Anna Danilina (Serbia) Aleksandra Krunić	7–6^{(7–4)}, 6–4
