= 2007 PTT Bangkok Open =

- Date: 8–14 October
- Edition: 3rd
- Category: Tier III
- Draw: 32S / 16D
- Prize money: $200,000
- Surface: Hard / outdoor
- Location: Bangkok, Thailand

Champions

Singles
- (Italy) Flavia Pennetta

Doubles
- (China) Sun Tiantian / (China) Yan Zi
← 2006 ·	PTT Bangkok Open

The 2007 PTT Bangkok Open was a tennis tournament played on outdoor hard courts. It was the 3rd and final edition of the PTT Bangkok Open, and was a Tier III event on the 2007 Sony Ericsson WTA Tour. It was held in Bangkok, Thailand, from 8 October through 14 October 2009. Total prize money for the tournament was $200,000.

== Finals ==
=== Singles ===
(Italy) Flavia Pennetta defeated (Chinese Taipei) Chan Yung-jan, 6–1, 6–3

- Pennetta won her fourth WTA title of her career.

=== Doubles ===
(China) Sun Tiantian / (China) Yan Zi defeated (Japan) Ayumi Morita / (Japan) Junri Namigata, Walkover

== WTA entrants ==
=== Singles ===
==== Seeds ====
Country	Player	Rank^{1}	Seed
SRB	Jelena Janković	3	1
USA	Venus Williams	8	2
ISR	Shahar Pe'er	16	3
FRA	Virginie Razzano	33	4
SVK	Dominika Cibulková	47	5
JPN	Aiko Nakamura	52	6
ITA	Flavia Pennetta	53	7
ROU	Raluca Olaru	60	8

- ^{1} Seeds are based on the rankings of 8 October 2007.

==== Other entrants ====
The following players received wildcards into the singles main draw:

- (Romania) Sorana Cîrstea
- (Thailand) Noppawan Lertcheewakarn
- (Poland) Urszula Radwańska

The following players received entry from the singles qualifying draw:

- (Luxembourg) Anne Kremer
- (Argentina) María Emilia Salerni
- (Slovakia) Magdaléna Rybáriková
- (Uzbekistan) Akgul Amanmuradova

==== Withdrawals ====
During the tournament

- (Romania) Edina Gallovits (Heat illness)
- (Serbia) Jelena Janković (Heat illness)
- (United States) Vania King (Right lower back injury)
- (Croatia) Jelena Kostanić Tošić (Right thoracic spine injury)

=== Doubles ===
==== Seeds ====
Countries	Team	Rank^{1}	Seed
CHN / CHN	Sun Tiantian & Yan Zi	33	1
USA / RUS	Vania King & Anastasia Rodionova	94	2
USA / CRO	Jill Craybas & Jelena Kostanić Tošić	132	3
ESP / ESP	Lourdes Domínguez Lino & Arantxa Parra Santonja	138	4

- ^{1} Seeds are based on the rankings of 8 October 2007.

==== Other entrants ====
The following players received wildcards into the doubles main draw:

- (Thailand) Sophia Mulsap & (Thailand) Varatchaya Wongteanchai

The following players received an entry as alternates into the doubles main draw:

- (Luxembourg) Anne Kremer & (Canada) Aleksandra Wozniak

==== Withdrawals ====
Before the tournament

- (United States) Jill Craybas & (Croatia) Jelena Kostanić Tošić (Kostanić Tošić withdrew with a right thoracic spine injury)

During the tournament

- (Australia) Casey Dellacqua (Lumbar spine injury)
- (United States) Vania King (Right lower back injury)
- (Japan) Ayumi Morita (Gastro-intestinal illness)

== Prize money and points breakdown ==
=== Singles ===
Round	Money	Points
Winner	$28,161	140
Finalist	$15,150	100
Semifinalist	$8,080	65
Quarterfinalist	$4,300	35
2nd round	$2,295	20
1st round	$1,225	1

=== Doubles ===
Round	Money	Points
Winner	$8,410	140
Finalist	$4,480	100
Semifinalist	$2,400	65
Quarterfinalist	$1,280	35
1st round	$680	1
