= 2007 PTT Bangkok Open – Doubles =

Doubles
- 2007 PTT Bangkok Open

Final
- Champions: (China) Sun Tiantian (China) Yan Zi
- Runners-up: (Japan) Ayumi Morita (Japan) Junri Namigata
- Score: Walkover

Events
Singles	Doubles
← 2006 ·	PTT Bangkok Open

The women's doubles Tournament at the 2007 PTT Bangkok Open took place between 8 October and 14 October on the outdoor hard courts in Bangkok, Thailand. Sun Tiantian and Yan Zi won the title after Ayumi Morita and Junri Namigata retired from the final.

== Seeds ==
1. (China) Sun Tiantian / (China) Yan Zi (champions)
2. (United States) Vania King / (Russia) Anastasia Rodionova (quarterfinals)
3. (United States) Jill Craybas / (Croatia) Jelena Kostanić Tošić (withdrew)
4. (Spain) Lourdes Domínguez Lino / (Spain) Arantxa Parra Santonja (first round)

== Draw ==
=== Key ===
- Q = Qualifier
- WC = Wild card
- LL = Lucky loser
- Alt = Alternate
- SE = Special exempt
- PR = Protected ranking
- ITF = ITF entry
- JE = Junior exempt
- w/o = Walkover
- r = Retired
- d = Defaulted
- SR = Special ranking

First round
1	(China) T Sun (China) Z Yan	6	4	[10]
(Poland) U Radwańska (Denmark) C Wozniacki	1	6	[4]
(Uzbekistan) A Amanmuradova (Ukraine) Y Fedak	6	6^{5}	[10]
(France) S Lefèvre (Romania) Á Szatmári	4	7	[4]
4	(Spain) L Domínguez Lino (Spain) A Parra Santonja	4	6^{5}
WC	(Thailand) S Mulsap (Thailand) V Wongteanchai	6	7
(Colombia) C Castaño (Romania) E Gallovits	6	6
(Russia) M Kondratieva (Czech Republic) H Šromová	2	4
(Hungary) M Czink (United States) C Fusano	3	4
(Australia) C Dellacqua (South Africa) N Grandin	6	6
(Japan) A Morita (Japan) J Namigata	6	6
Alt	(Luxembourg) A Kremer (Canada) A Wozniak	1	1
(France) C Pin (Argentina) ME Salerni	7	6
(Japan) A Nakamura (Thailand) T Tanasugarn	6^{5}	4
(Romania) S Cîrstea (Spain) N Llagostera Vives	6	4	[7]
2	(United States) V King (Russia) A Rodionova	3	6	[10]

Second round
1	(China) T Sun (China) Z Yan	6	6
(Uzbekistan) A Amanmuradova (Ukraine) Y Fedak	3	1
WC	(Thailand) S Mulsap (Thailand) V Wongteanchai	6	6
5	(Colombia) C Castaño (Romania) E Gallovits	1	4
(Australia) C Dellacqua (South Africa) N Grandin
(Japan) A Morita (Japan) J Namigata	w/o
(France) C Pin (Argentina) ME Salerni	w/o
2	(United States) V King (Russia) A Rodionova

Quarterfinals
1	(China) T Sun (China) Z Yan	6	6
WC	(Thailand) S Mulsap (Thailand) V Wongteanchai	2	0
(Japan) A Morita (Japan) J Namigata	6	6
(France) C Pin (Argentina) ME Salerni	3	4

Semifinals
1	(China) T Sun (China) Z Yan	w/o
(Japan) A Morita (Japan) J Namigata
