= 2007 PTT Bangkok Open – Singles =

Singles
- 2007 PTT Bangkok Open

Final
- Champion: (Italy) Flavia Pennetta
- Runner-up: (Chinese Taipei) Chan Yung-jan
- Score: 6–1, 6–3

Events
| Singles | Doubles |
| ← 2006 · | PTT Bangkok Open |

Vania King was the defending champion, but was forced to withdraw in the quarterfinals due to a lower back injury.

Flavia Pennetta won the tournament, defeating Chan Yung-jan 6–1, 6–3 in the final.

== Seeds ==
1. (Serbia) Jelena Janković (first round, retired due to heat exhaustion)
2. (United States) Venus Williams (semifinals)
3. (Israel) Shahar Pe'er (quarterfinals)
4. (France) Virginie Razzano (second round)
5. (Slovakia) Dominika Cibulková (second round)
6. (Japan) Aiko Nakamura (first round)
7. (Italy) Flavia Pennetta (champion)
8. (Romania) Ioana Raluca Olaru (first round)

== Draw ==
=== Key ===
- Q = Qualifier
- WC = Wild card
- LL = Lucky loser
- Alt = Alternate
- SE = Special exempt
- PR = Protected ranking
- ITF = ITF entry
- JE = Junior exempt
- w/o = Walkover
- r = Retired
- d = Defaulted
- SR = Special ranking

=== Finals ===
Semifinals
(China) Yan Zi | 5 | 6 | 5
(Chinese Taipei) Chan Yung-jan | 7 | 3 | 7
7 | (Italy) Flavia Pennetta | 6 | 7^{10}
2 | (United States) Venus Williams | 4 | 6^{8}

Final
(Chinese Taipei) Chan Yung-jan | 1 | 3
7 | (Italy) Flavia Pennetta | 6 | 6

=== Top half ===
First round
1 | (Serbia) J Janković | 6 | 6^{5} | r
(China) Z Yan | 4 | 7^{7}
(Russia) O Poutchkova | 6 | 4 | 6
Q | (Luxembourg) A Kremer | 3 | 6 | 2
(United States) J Craybas | 1 | 6 | 2
(United States) V King | 6 | 3 | 6
Q | (Argentina) ME Salerni | 2 | 6 | 2
5 | (Slovakia) D Cibulková | 6 | 4 | 6
4 | (France) V Razzano | 6 | 6
(Spain) L Domínguez Lino | 0 | 3
WC | (Romania) S Cîrstea | 0 | 3
WC | (Poland) U Radwańska | 6 | 6
Q | (Slovakia) M Rybáriková | 3 | 3
(Chinese Taipei) Y-j Chan | 6 | 6
(Canada) A Wozniak | 7 | 6
8 | (Romania) IR Olaru | 5 | 4

Second round
(China) Z Yan | 3 | 6 | 6
(Russia) O Poutchkova | 6 | 1 | 1
(United States) V King | 6^{8} | 7^{8} | 7^{7}
5 | (Slovakia) D Cibulková | 7^{10} | 6^{6} | 6^{4}
4 | (France) V Razzano | 6^{3} | 5
WC | (Poland) U Radwańska | 7^{7} | 7
(Chinese Taipei) Y-j Chan | 4 | 6 | 6
(Canada) A Wozniak | 6 | 3 | 2

Quarterfinals
(China) Z Yan | w/o
(United States) V King
WC | (Poland) U Radwańska | 2 | 3
(Chinese Taipei) Y-j Chan | 6 | 6

Semifinals
(China) Z Yan | 5 | 6 | 5
(Chinese Taipei) Y-j Chan | 7 | 3 | 7

=== Bottom half ===
First round
7 | (Italy) F Pennetta | 6 | 6
WC | (Thailand) N Lertcheewakarn | 0 | 2
(Australia) C Dellacqua | 6 | 6
(France) S Brémond | 2 | 4
Q | (Uzbekistan) A Amanmuradova | 4 | 3
(Russia) A Rodionova | 6 | 6
(Hungary) M Czink | 6^{3} | 4
3 | (Israel) S Pe'er | 7^{7} | 6
6 | (Japan) A Nakamura | 4 | 6^{5}
(Czech Republic) K Zakopalová | 6 | 7^{7}
(Croatia) J Kostanić Tošić | 5 | 0^{r}
(France) C Pin | 7 | 0
(Romania) E Gallovits | 5 | 1^{r}
(Thailand) T Tanasugarn | 7 | 3
(Denmark) C Wozniacki | 4 | 1
2 | (United States) V Williams | 6 | 6

Second round
7 | (Italy) F Pennetta | 2 | 6 | 7
(Australia) C Dellacqua | 6 | 3 | 5
(Russia) A Rodionova | 1 | 1
3 | (Israel) S Pe'er | 6 | 6
(Czech Republic) K Zakopalová | 3 | 6^{1}
(France) C Pin | 6 | 7^{7}
(Thailand) T Tanasugarn | 4 | 1
2 | (United States) V Williams | 6 | 6

Quarterfinals
7 | (Italy) F Pennetta | 3 | 6 | 6
3 | (Israel) S Pe'er | 6 | 4 | 2
(France) C Pin | 1 | 1
2 | (United States) V Williams | 6 | 6

Semifinals
7 | (Italy) F Pennetta | 6 | 7^{10}
2 | (United States) V Williams | 4 | 6^{8}
