= 2005 PTT Bangkok Open – Doubles =

Doubles
- 2005 PTT Bangkok Open

Final
- Champions: (Japan) Shinobu Asagoe (Argentina) Gisela Dulko
- Runners-up: (Spain) Conchita Martínez (Spain) Virginia Ruano Pascual
- Score: 6–1, 7–5

Events
| Singles | Doubles |
| PTT Bangkok Open | · 2006 → |

This was the first edition of the tournament.

Shinobu Asagoe and Gisela Dulko won the title by defeating Conchita Martínez and Virginia Ruano Pascual 6–1, 7–5 in the final.

== Seeds ==
1. (Spain) Conchita Martínez / (Spain) Virginia Ruano Pascual (final)
2. (Japan) Shinobu Asagoe / (Argentina) Gisela Dulko (champions)
3. (Australia) Lisa McShea / (Australia) Bryanne Stewart (semifinals)
4. (Spain) Nuria Llagostera Vives / (Venezuela) María Vento-Kabchi (quarterfinals)

== Draw ==
=== Key ===
- Q = Qualifier
- WC = Wild card
- LL = Lucky loser
- Alt = Alternate
- SE = Special exempt
- PR = Protected ranking
- ITF = ITF entry
- JE = Junior exempt
- w/o = Walkover
- r = Retired
- d = Defaulted
- SR = Special ranking

=== Draw ===
First round
1 | (Spain) C Martínez (Spain) V Ruano Pascual | 6 | 6
(South Africa) N Grandin (Germany) M Müller | 1 | 1
(Austria) D Klemenschits (Austria) S Klemenschits | 3^{r}
(Chinese Taipei) C-j Chuang (Japan) R Fujiwara | 5
4 | (Spain) N Llagostera Vives (Venezuela) M Vento-Kabchi | 7 | 6
Q | (Japan) R Fuda (Japan) M Saeki | 5 | 2
(Indonesia) W Prakusya (Italy) A Serra Zanetti | 6 | 3 | 6
(Chinese Taipei) C-w Chan (Chinese Taipei) S-w Hsieh | 4 | 6 | 2
(United States) J Hopkins (United States) M Washington | 6 | 3 | 6
WC | (Thailand) N Luangnam (Thailand) T Tanasugarn | 4 | 6 | 4
(Italy) T Garbin (Israel) T Obziler | 6^{4} | 3
3 | (Australia) L McShea (Australia) B Stewart | 7^{7} | 6
(United States) C Gullickson (United States) A Spears | 2 | 6^{3}
(India) S Mirza (Israel) S Pe'er | 6 | 7^{7}
(Japan) S Obata (Australia) T Musgrave | 2 | 3
2 | (Japan) S Asagoe (Argentina) G Dulko | 6 | 6

Quarterfinals
1 | (Spain) C Martínez (Spain) V Ruano Pascual | 6 | 6
(Chinese Taipei) C-j Chuang (Japan) R Fujiwara | 2 | 1
4 | (Spain) N Llagostera Vives (Venezuela) M Vento-Kabchi | 2 | 6 | 2
(Indonesia) W Prakusya (Italy) A Serra Zanetti | 6 | 3 | 6
(United States) J Hopkins (United States) M Washington | 5 | 6 | 6^{2}
3 | (Australia) L McShea (Australia) B Stewart | 7 | 2 | 7^{7}
(India) S Mirza (Israel) S Pe'er
2 | (Japan) S Asagoe (Argentina) G Dulko | w/o

Semifinals
1 | (Spain) C Martínez (Spain) V Ruano Pascual | 6 | 7^{7}
(Indonesia) W Prakusya (Italy) A Serra Zanetti | 0 | 6^{5}
3 | (Australia) L McShea (Australia) B Stewart | 3 | 4
2 | (Japan) S Asagoe (Argentina) G Dulko | 6 | 6

Final
1 | (Spain) C Martínez (Spain) V Ruano Pascual | 1 | 5
2 | (Japan) S Asagoe (Argentina) G Dulko | 6 | 7
