= 2016 Jiangxi International Women's Tennis Open – Doubles =

Doubles
- 2016 Jiangxi International Women's Tennis Open

Final
- Champions: (China) Liang Chen (China) Lu Jingjing
- Runners-up: (Japan) Shuko Aoyama (Japan) Makoto Ninomiya
- Score: 3–6, 7–6^{(7–2)}, [13–11]

Details
- Draw: 16
- Seeds: 4

Events
Singles	Doubles
- Jiangxi International Women's Tennis Open

Chang Kai-chen and Zheng Saisai were the defending champions, but Zheng chose not to participate this year. Chang played alongside Duan Yingying, but lost in the first round to Nicha Lertpitaksinchai and Peangtarn Plipuech.

Liang Chen and Lu Jingjing won the title, defeating Japanese second seeds Shuko Aoyama and Makoto Ninomiya in the final 3–6, 7–6^{(7–2)}, [13–11].

== Seeds ==
1. (China) Wang Yafan / (China) Yang Zhaoxuan (semifinals)
2. (Japan) Shuko Aoyama / (Japan) Makoto Ninomiya (final)
3. (China) Han Xinyun / (China) Zhang Kailin (quarterfinals)
4. (Japan) Miyu Kato / (Japan) Kurumi Nara (first round)

== Draw ==
Key

- Q = Qualifier
- WC = Wild card
- LL = Lucky loser
- Alt = Alternate
- ITF = ITF entry
- PR = Protected ranking
- SR = Special ranking
- SE = Special exempt
- JE = Junior exempt
- JR = Junior Accelerator Programme entrant
- CO = College Accelerator Programme entrant
- NG = Next Gen Accelerator Program entrant
- w/o = Walkover
- r = Retired
- d = Defaulted

First round
1	(China) Y Wang (China) Z Yang	6	6
(Japan) Y Tanaka (China) R Tian	1	2
(China) X You (China) L Zhu	6	7^{7}
(South Korea) N-l Han (South Korea) S-j Jang	2	6^{5}
4	(Japan) M Kato (Japan) K Nara	2	3
(China) C Liang (China) J Lu	6	6
(Chinese Taipei) C-w Chan (Australia) S Sanders	7^{7}	7
(Japan) K Hisami (Japan) K Takahata	6^{2}	5
(Thailand) N Lertpitaksinchai (Thailand) P Plipuech	6	6
WC	(Chinese Taipei) K-c Chang (China) Y Duan	1	2
(Japan) M Eguchi (France) S Reix	6	3	[6]
3	(China) X Han (China) K Zhang	4	6	[10]
(Russia) V Ivakhnenko (Russia) M Melnikova	4	6	[11]
WC	(China) Z Sun (China) A Zhu	6	4	[13]
(Chinese Taipei) Y-h Lee (Thailand) V Wongteanchai	6^{4}	3
2	(Japan) S Aoyama (Japan) M Ninomiya	7^{7}	6

Quarterfinals
1	(China) Y Wang (China) Z Yang	6	6
(China) X You (China) L Zhu	1	3
(China) C Liang (China) J Lu	7	2	[11]
(Chinese Taipei) C-w Chan (Australia) S Sanders	5	6	[9]
(Thailand) N Lertpitaksinchai (Thailand) P Plipuech	2	7	[12]
3	(China) X Han (China) K Zhang	6	5	[10]
WC	(China) Z Sun (China) A Zhu	2	1
2	(Japan) S Aoyama (Japan) M Ninomiya	6	6

Semifinals
1	(China) Y Wang (China) Z Yang	2	4
(China) C Liang (China) J Lu	6	6
(Thailand) N Lertpitaksinchai (Thailand) P Plipuech	2	6	[4]
2	(Japan) S Aoyama (Japan) M Ninomiya	6	3	[10]

Final
(China) C Liang (China) J Lu	3	7^{7}	[13]
2	(Japan) S Aoyama (Japan) M Ninomiya	6	6^{2}	[11]
