= 2006 PTT Bangkok Open – Singles =

Singles
- 2006 PTT Bangkok Open

Final
- Champion: (United States) Vania King
- Runner-up: (Thailand) Tamarine Tanasugarn
- Score: 2–6, 6–4, 6–4

Events
Singles	Doubles
← 2005 ·	PTT Bangkok Open	· 2007 →

The Czech Republic's Nicole Vaidišová was the defending champion, but decided to compete in the 2006 Kremlin Cup, which was held in the same week at Moscow, Russia.

Vania King won the title, defeating Tamarine Tanasugarn in the final. This was King's 1st title of her career.

== Seeds ==
1. (France) Marion Bartoli (withdrew because of a right achilles injury)
2. (Spain) Anabel Medina Garrigues (first round)
3. (France) Nathalie Dechy (second round)
4. (Czech Republic) Lucie Šafářová (second round)
5. (Greece) Eleni Daniilidou (quarterfinals)
6. (United States) Meghann Shaughnessy (semifinals)
7. (Spain) Lourdes Domínguez Lino (withdrew because of a right shoulder injury)
8. (Croatia) Jelena Kostanić (quarterfinals)
9. (France) Séverine Brémond (semifinals)
10. (Colombia) Catalina Castaño (first round)

== Draw ==
=== Key ===
- Q = Qualifier
- WC = Wild card
- LL = Lucky loser
- Alt = Alternate
- SE = Special exempt
- PR = Protected ranking
- ITF = ITF entry
- JE = Junior exempt
- w/o = Walkover
- r = Retired
- d = Defaulted
- SR = Special ranking

=== Finals ===
Semifinals
WC	(Thailand) Tamarine Tanasugarn	6	6
9	(France) Séverine Brémond	2	3
(United States) Vania King	6	6
6	(United States) Meghann Shaughnessy	1	4

Final
WC	(Thailand) Tamarine Tanasugarn	6	4	4
(United States) Vania King	2	6	6

=== Top half ===
First round
3	(France) N Dechy	6	6
Q	(China) Z Yan	4	4
(Austria) S Bammer	6	6
(Australia) N Pratt	1	3
(United States) J Jackson	6	6
(Hungary) M Czink	2	3
WC	(Thailand) T Tanasugarn	6	7^{7}
10	(Colombia) C Castaño	0	6^{5}
5	(Greece) E Daniilidou	4	6	6
Q	(Chinese Taipei) S-w Hsieh	6	4	3
LL	(Japan) E Takao	6	6
(Russia) A Jidkova	3	1
(China) T Sun	4	6	3
(Czech Republic) K Zakopalová	6	4	6
LL	(Japan) R Fuda	2	6	5
9	(France) S Brémond	6	2	7

Second round
3	(France) N Dechy	3	1
(Austria) S Bammer	6	6
(United States) J Jackson	1	0^{r}
WC	(Thailand) T Tanasugarn	6	2
5	(Greece) E Daniilidou	6	6
LL	(Japan) E Takao	4	4
(Czech Republic) K Zakopalová	7	4	3
9	(France) S Brémond	5	6	6

Quarterfinals
(Austria) S Bammer	0	2
WC	(Thailand) T Tanasugarn	6	6
5	(Greece) E Daniilidou	6	6^{5}	3
9	(France) S Brémond	4	7^{7}	6

Semifinals
WC	(Thailand) T Tanasugarn	6	6
9	(France) S Brémond	2	3

=== Bottom half ===
First round
8	(Croatia) J Kostanić	5	6	7^{7}
Q	(China) M Yuan	7	4	6^{5}
WC	(Thailand) S Viratprasert	4	0
(Poland) M Domachowska	6	6
(Australia) A Molik	1	5
(United States) V King	6	7
(Tunisia) S Sfar	3	3
4	(Czech Republic) L Šafářová	6	6
6	(United States) M Shaughnessy	6	6
(India) S Mirza	4	4
(Germany) J Schruff	6	7^{7}
(Finland) E Laine	4	6^{5}
(Japan) A Nakamura	6	6
WC	(Thailand) N Luangnam	1	4
Q	(Argentina) M Díaz Oliva	6^{4}	6	6
2	(Spain) A Medina Garrigues	7^{7}	3	4

Second round
8	(Croatia) J Kostanić	6	6
(Poland) M Domachowska	1	0
(United States) V King	6	6
4	(Czech Republic) L Šafářová	1	1
6	(United States) M Shaughnessy	6	6
(Germany) J Schruff	1	3
(Japan) A Nakamura	6	6
Q	(Argentina) M Díaz Oliva	4	3

Quarterfinals
8	(Croatia) J Kostanić	1	1
(United States) V King	6	6
6	(United States) M Shaughnessy	6	6
(Japan) A Nakamura	2	4

Semifinals
(United States) V King	6	6
6	(United States) M Shaughnessy	1	4

== Qualifying ==
=== Seeds ===
1. (China) Yuan Meng (qualified)
2. (Japan) Erika Takao (qualifying competition, lucky loser)
3. (Chinese Taipei) Hsieh Su-wei (qualified)
4. (Japan) Ryōko Fuda (qualifying competition, lucky loser)
5. (China) Yan Zi (qualified)
6. (Argentina) Mariana Díaz Oliva (qualified)
7. (India) Shikha Uberoi (qualifying competition)
8. (Indonesia) Angelique Widjaja (qualifying competition)

=== Qualifiers ===
1. (China) Yuan Meng
2. (China) Yan Zi
3. (Chinese Taipei) Hsieh Su-wei
4. (Argentina) Mariana Díaz Oliva

=== Lucky losers ===
1. (Japan) Erika Takao
2. (Japan) Ryōko Fuda

=== Qualifying draw ===
==== First qualifier ====
First round				Second round				Qualifying competition
				1	(China) Yuan Meng	6	6
				WC	(Thailand) Noppawan Lertcheewakarn	1	1
								1	(China) Yuan Meng	6	6
WC	(Thailand) Nungnadda Wannasuk	6	6					8	(Indonesia) Angelique Widjaja	3	3
	(South Korea) Lyoo-suh Hee-sun	1	4	WC	(Thailand) Nungnadda Wannasuk	3	0
				8	(Indonesia) Angelique Widjaja	6	6

==== Second qualifier ====
First round				Second round				Qualifying competition
				2	(Japan) Erika Takao	6	6
				WC	(Thailand) Nicha Lertpitaksinchai	1	3
								2	(Japan) Erika Takao	6^{4}	6	1
	(South Korea) Yoo Mi	6	3					5	(China) Yan Zi	7^{7}	3	6
WC	(Thailand) Ketravee Attachoo	1	0^{r}		(South Korea) Yoo Mi	3	3
				5	(China) Yan Zi	6	6

==== Third qualifier ====
First round		Second round					Qualifying competition
		3	(Chinese Taipei) Hsieh Su-wei	6	6
			(South Korea) Bae Hae-youm	0	1
							3	(Chinese Taipei) Hsieh Su-wei	7	6
(China) Li Ting	w/o						7	(India) Shikha Uberoi	5	3
(South Africa) Natalie Grandin			(China) Li Ting	7^{7}	4	2
		7	(India) Shikha Uberoi	6^{3}	6	6

==== Fourth qualifier ====
First round			Second round					Qualifying competition
			4	(Japan) Ryōko Fuda	6	6
			WC	(Thailand) Varatchaya Wongteanchai	3	1
								4	(Japan) Ryōko Fuda	4	3
(Venezuela) María Vento-Kabchi	6^{1}	4						6	(Argentina) Mariana Díaz Oliva	6	6
(Thailand) Napaporn Tongsalee	7^{7}	6		(Thailand) Napaporn Tongsalee	3	6	2
			6	(Argentina) Mariana Díaz Oliva	6	4	6
