= 2016 Jiangxi International Women's Tennis Open =

- Date: 1–7 August
- Edition: 3rd
- Category: WTA International
- Draw: 32S/16D
- Prize money: $250,000
- Surface: Hard / outdoor
- Location: Nanchang, China

Champions

Singles
- (China) Duan Yingying

Doubles
- (China) Liang Chen / (China) Lu Jingjing
- Jiangxi International Women's Tennis Open

The 2016 Jiangxi International Women's Tennis Open was a professional women's tennis tournament played on outdoor hard courts. It was the third edition of the tournament, in the International category of the 2016 WTA Tour and took place in Nanchang, China, from 1 August through 7 August 2016. Unseeded Duan Yingying won the singles title.

== Finals ==
=== Singles ===
- (China) Duan Yingying defeated (United States) Vania King 1–6, 6–4, 6–2

=== Doubles ===
- (China) Liang Chen / (China) Lu Jingjing defeated (Japan) Shuko Aoyama / (Japan) Makoto Ninomiya, 3–6, 7–6^{(7–2)}, [13–11]

== Points and prize money ==
=== Point distribution ===
Event	W	F	SF	QF	Round of 16	Round of 32	Q	Q2	Q1
Singles	280	180	110	60	30	1	18	12	1
Doubles	280	180	110	60	1	—N/a	—N/a	—N/a	—N/a

=== Prize money ===
Event	W	F	SF	QF	Round of 16	Round of 32	Q2	Q1
Singles	$43,000	$21,400	$11,500	$6,175	$3,400	$2,100	$1,020	$600
Doubles	$12,300	$6,400	$3,435	$1,820	$960	—N/a	—N/a	—N/a

== Singles main draw entrants ==
=== Seeds ===
Country	Player	Rank^{1}	Seed
~~POL~~	~~Magda Linette~~	~~86~~	~~1~~
JPN	Kurumi Nara	91	2
ITA	Francesca Schiavone	107	3
CRO	Donna Vekić	109	4
CHN	Zhang Kailin	112	5
USA	Vania King	120	6
JPN	Risa Ozaki	126	7
CHN	Han Xinyun	127	8
BUL	Elitsa Kostova	131	9

- Rankings are as of July 25, 2016.

=== Other entrants ===
The following players received wildcards into the singles main draw:

- (China) Lu Jiajing
- (China) Yang Zhaoxuan
- (China) Zheng Wushuang
- (China) Zhang Yuxuan

The following player received entry by a protected ranking:

- (Croatia) Tereza Mrdeža

The following players received entry from the qualifying draw:

- (Thailand) Nicha Lertpitaksinchai
- (China) Lu Jingjing
- (Japan) Junri Namigata
- (Thailand) Peangtarn Plipuech
- (Australia) Storm Sanders
- (China) Zhang Ying

The following player received entry by a lucky loser spot:

- (South Korea) Han Na-lae

=== Withdrawals ===
Before the tournament

- (Kazakhstan) Zarina Diyas → replaced by (Bulgaria) Elitsa Kostova
- (Poland) Magda Linette → replaced by (South Korea) Han Na-lae
- (Czech Republic) Kateřina Siniaková → replaced by (Slovakia) Daniela Hantuchová
- (China) Wang Qiang → replaced by (Russia) Marina Melnikova

== Doubles main draw entrants ==
=== Seeds ===
Country	Player	Country	Player	Rank^{1}	Seed
CHN	Wang Yafan	CHN	Yang Zhaoxuan	123	1
JPN	Shuko Aoyama	JPN	Makoto Ninomiya	154	2
CHN	Han Xinyun	CHN	Zhang Kailin	180	3
JPN	Miyu Kato	JPN	Kurumi Nara	219	4

- Rankings are as of July 25, 2016.

=== Other entrants ===
The following pairs received wildcards into the doubles main draw:

- (Chinese Taipei) Chang Kai-Chen / (China) Duan Yingying
- (China) Sun Ziyue / (China) Zhu Aiwen
