= 2005 PTT Bangkok Open =

- Date: 10–16 October
- Edition: 1st
- Category: Tier III
- Draw: 32S / 16D
- Prize money: $200,000
- Surface: Hard / outdoor
- Location: Bangkok, Thailand
- Venue: Rama Gardens Hotel

Champions

Singles
- (Czech Republic) Nicole Vaidišová

Doubles
- (Japan) Shinobu Asagoe / (Argentina) Gisela Dulko
- PTT Bangkok Open

The 2005 PTT Bangkok Open was a women's professional tennis tournament played on outdoor hard courts. It was the 1st edition of the PTT Bangkok Open and was part of the WTA Tier III tournaments on the 2005 WTA Tour. It took place at the Rama Gardens Hotel in Bangkok, Thailand from October 10 through October 16, 2005.

== Singles main-draw entrants ==
=== Seeds ===
Country	Player	Ranking^{1}	Seed
RUS	Nadia Petrova	9	1
CZE	Nicole Vaidišová	21	2
ARG	Gisela Dulko	34	3
JPN	Shinobu Asagoe	36	4
IND	Sania Mirza	37	5
ESP	Conchita Martínez	39	6
FRA	Marion Bartoli	45	7
ISR	Shahar Pe'er	50	8

- ^{1} Rankings as of October 3, 2005

=== Other entrants ===
The following players received wildcards into the main draw:

- (Spain) Virginia Ruano Pascual
- (Thailand) Suchanun Viratprasert

The following players received entry from the qualifying draw:

- (Hungary) Melinda Czink
- (France) Stéphanie Foretz
- (Chinese Taipei) Hsieh Su-wei
- (Japan) Saori Obata

The following players received entry as a lucky loser:

- (Germany) Martina Müller
- (United States) Shenay Perry

== Doubles main-draw entrants ==
=== Seeds ===
Country	Player	Rank^{1}	Country	Player	Rank^{1}	Seed
ESP	Conchita Martínez	16	ESP	Virginia Ruano Pascual	1	1
JPN	Shinobu Asagoe	28	ARG	Gisela Dulko	46	2
AUS	Lisa McShea	77	AUS	Bryanne Stewart	22	3
ESP	Nuria Llagostera Vives	68	VEN	María Vento-Kabchi	36	4

- ^{1} Rankings are as of October 3, 2005

=== Other entrants ===
The following pair received wildcards into the doubles main draw:

- (Thailand) Nudnida Luangnam / (Thailand) Tamarine Tanasugarn

The following pair received entry from the qualifying draw:

- (Japan) Ryōko Fuda / (Japan) Miho Saeki

== Champions ==
=== Singles ===
- (Czech Republic) Nicole Vaidišová def. (Russia) Nadia Petrova, 6–1, 6–7^{(5–7)}, 7–5

It was the 5th title for Vaidišová in her career and the 3rd consecutive title in 3 straight weeks, after winning in Seoul and Tokyo.

=== Doubles ===
- (Japan) Shinobu Asagoe / (Argentina) Gisela Dulko def. (Spain) Conchita Martínez / (Spain) Virginia Ruano Pascual, 6–1, 7–5
