= 2016 Jiangxi International Women's Tennis Open – Singles =

Singles
- 2016 Jiangxi International Women's Tennis Open

Final
- Champion: (China) Duan Yingying
- Runner-up: (United States) Vania King
- Score: 1–6, 6–4, 6–2

Details
- Draw: 32
- Seeds: 8

Events
Singles	Doubles
- Jiangxi International Women's Tennis Open

Jelena Janković was the defending champion, but chose to participate in Florianópolis instead.

Duan Yingying won her first WTA title, defeating Vania King in the final 1–6, 6–4, 6–2.

== Seeds ==
1. (Poland) Magda Linette (withdrew; chosen to compete in Rio Summer Olympics)
2. (Japan) Kurumi Nara (quarterfinals)
3. (Italy) Francesca Schiavone (quarterfinals)
4. (Croatia) Donna Vekić (first round)
5. (China) Zhang Kailin (quarterfinals)
6. (United States) Vania King (final)
7. (Japan) Risa Ozaki (semifinals)
8. (China) Han Xinyun (second round)
9. (Bulgaria) Elitsa Kostova (first round)

== Draw ==
Key

- Q = Qualifier
- WC = Wild card
- LL = Lucky loser
- Alt = Alternate
- ITF = ITF entry
- PR = Protected ranking
- SR = Special ranking
- SE = Special exempt
- JE = Junior exempt
- JR = Junior Accelerator Programme entrant
- CO = College Accelerator Programme entrant
- NG = Next Gen Accelerator Program entrant
- w/o = Walkover
- r = Retired
- d = Defaulted

=== Finals ===
Semifinals
7	(Japan) Risa Ozaki	2	2
6	(United States) Vania King	6	6
(Japan) Misa Eguchi	4	6^{7}
(China) Duan Yingying	6	7^{9}

Final
6	(United States) Vania King	6	4	2
(China) Duan Yingying	1	6	6

=== Top half ===
First round
3	(Italy) F Schiavone	6	6
WC	(China) Z Yang	0	4
WC	(China) Jia Lu	5	6	7
(Slovakia) D Hantuchová	7	4	5
Q	(Thailand) P Plipuech	2	4
Q	(Thailand) N Lertpitaksinchai	6	6
LL	(South Korea) N-l Han	3	1
7	(Japan) R Ozaki	6	6
5	(China) K Zhang	3	6	6
(Serbia) I Jorović	6	4	3
(Japan) M Kato	1	7^{7}	6
(Poland) U Radwańska	6	6^{4}	3
Q	(China) Yi Zhang	6	6
(China) Y Wang	3	1
Q	(Australia) S Sanders	4	2
6	(United States) V King	6	6

Second round
3	(Italy) F Schiavone	4	6	6
WC	(China) Jia Lu	6	1	2
Q	(Thailand) N Lertpitaksinchai	0	3
7	(Japan) R Ozaki	6	6
5	(China) K Zhang	6	7
(Japan) M Kato	4	5
Q	(China) Yi Zhang	4	2
6	(United States) V King	6	6

Quarterfinals
3	(Italy) F Schiavone	7	1	2
7	(Japan) R Ozaki	5	6	6
5	(China) K Zhang	0	4
6	(United States) V King	6	6

Semifinals
7	(Japan) R Ozaki	2	2
6	(United States) V King	6	6

=== Bottom half ===
First round
9	(Bulgaria) E Kostova	2	1
(Japan) M Eguchi	6	6
Q	(China) Jin Lu	3	6	4
(China) L Zhu	6	2	6
(South Korea) S-j Jang	6	6
WC	(China) W Zheng	1	4
(China) F Liu	6	6
4	(Croatia) D Vekić	2	2
8	(China) X Han	2	6	7
Q	(Japan) J Namigata	6	4	5
(Russia) M Melnikova	2	2
(China) Y Duan	6	6
(Chinese Taipei) K-c Chang	7	4	6
WC	(China) Yu Zhang	5	6	3
PR	(Croatia) T Mrdeža	3	5
2	(Japan) K Nara	6	7

Second round
(Japan) M Eguchi	6	6
(China) L Zhu	4	2
(South Korea) S-j Jang	4	3
(China) F Liu	6	6
8	(China) X Han	6	4	2
(China) Y Duan	3	6	6
(Chinese Taipei) K-c Chang	5	4
2	(Japan) K Nara	7	6

Quarterfinals
(Japan) M Eguchi	6	6
(China) F Liu	1	2
(China) Y Duan	6	7
2	(Japan) K Nara	1	5

Semifinals
(Japan) M Eguchi	4	6^{7}
(China) Y Duan	6	7^{9}

== Qualifying ==
=== Seeds ===
1. (South Korea) Han Na-lae (qualifying competition, lucky loser)
2. (Chinese Taipei) Lee Ya-hsuan (qualifying competition)
3. (France) Shérazad Reix (qualifying competition)
4. (China) Lu Jingjing (qualified)
5. (Italy) Martina Caregaro (qualifying competition)
6. (Japan) Ayaka Okuno (first round)
7. (Australia) Storm Sanders (qualified)
8. (Russia) Valentyna Ivakhnenko (first round)
9. (China) Tian Ran (first round)
10. (Thailand) Varatchaya Wongteanchai (first round)
11. (Japan) Erika Sema (first round)
12. (Japan) Makoto Ninomiya (first round)

=== Qualifiers ===
1. (Japan) Junri Namigata
2. (Thailand) Peangtarn Plipuech
3. (Australia) Storm Sanders
4. (China) Lu Jingjing
5. (China) Zhang Ying
6. (Thailand) Nicha Lertpitaksinchai

=== Lucky losers ===
1. (South Korea) Han Na-lae

=== Draw ===
==== First qualifier ====
First round
1	(South Korea) Han Na-lae	6	6
(Japan) Yuuki Tanaka	1	2
(Japan) Junri Namigata	6	3	6
10	(Thailand) Varatchaya Wongteanchai	1	6	2

Qualifying competition
1	(South Korea) Han Na-lae	2	6	4
(Japan) Junri Namigata	6	2	6

==== Second qualifier ====
First round
2	(Chinese Taipei) Lee Ya-hsuan	6	7
(Japan) Mizuno Kijima	1	5
(Thailand) Peangtarn Plipuech	6	6
8	(Russia) Valentyna Ivakhnenko	3	3

Qualifying competition
2	(Chinese Taipei) Lee Ya-hsuan	7^{8}	3	3
(Thailand) Peangtarn Plipuech	6^{6}	6	6

==== Third qualifier ====
First round
3	(France) Shérazad Reix	6	6
WC	(China) Gao Xinyu	1	0
(Japan) Kanae Hisami	0	3
7	(Australia) Storm Sanders	6	6

Qualifying competition
3	(France) Shérazad Reix	1	5
7	(Australia) Storm Sanders	6	7

==== Fourth qualifier ====
First round
4	(China) Lu Jingjing	6	6
WC	(China) Sun Ziyue	2	2
(China) Xun Fangying	6	7
12	(Japan) Makoto Ninomiya	4	5

Qualifying competition
4	(China) Lu Jingjing	7	6
(China) Xun Fangying	5	3

==== Fifth qualifier ====
First round
5	(Italy) Martina Caregaro	4	6	5
WC	(China) Sun Xuliu	6	2	0^{r}
WC	(China) Zhang Ying	6	6
9	(China) Tian Ran	2	4

Qualifying competition
5	(Italy) Martina Caregaro	6^{2}	6	2
WC	(China) Zhang Ying	7^{7}	3	6

==== Sixth qualifier ====
First round
6	(Japan) Ayaka Okuno	6^{4}	2
(Thailand) Nicha Lertpitaksinchai	7^{7}	6
(China) You Xiaodi	6	6
11	(Japan) Erika Sema	1	1

Qualifying competition
(Thailand) Nicha Lertpitaksinchai	6	6
(China) You Xiaodi	4	4
