= 2006 PTT Bangkok Open =

- Date: 9–15 October
- Edition: 2nd
- Category: Tier III
- Draw: 32S / 16D
- Prize money: $200,000
- Surface: Hard / outdoor
- Location: Bangkok, Thailand
- Venue: Rama Gardens Hotel

Champions

Singles
- (United States) Vania King

Doubles
- (United States) Vania King / (Croatia) Jelena Kostanić
- PTT Bangkok Open

The 2006 PTT Bangkok Open was a women's professional tennis tournament played on outdoor hard courts. It was the second edition of the PTT Bangkok Open and was part of the WTA Tier III tournaments on the 2006 WTA Tour. It took place at the Rama Gardens Hotel in Bangkok, Thailand from 9 October through 15 October 2006. Unseeded Vania King won the singles title.

== Singles main-draw entrants ==
=== Seeds ===
Country	Player	Ranking^{1}	Seed
~~FRA~~	~~Marion Bartoli~~	22	1
ESP	Anabel Medina Garrigues	28	2
FRA	Nathalie Dechy	39	3
CZE	Lucie Šafářová	40	4
GRE	Eleni Daniilidou	41	5
USA	Meghann Shaughnessy	43	6
~~ESP~~	~~Lourdes Domínguez Lino~~	45	7
CRO	Jelena Kostanić	50	8
FRA	Séverine Brémond	53	9
COL	Catalina Castaño	54	10

- ^{1} Rankings as of October 2, 2006

=== Other entrants ===
The following players received wildcards into the main draw:

- (Thailand) Nudnida Luangnam
- (Thailand) Tamarine Tanasugarn
- (Thailand) Suchanun Viratprasert

The following players received entry from the qualifying draw:

- (Argentina) Mariana Díaz Oliva
- (Chinese Taipei) Hsieh Su-wei
- (China) Yan Zi
- (China) Yuan Meng

The following players received entry as a lucky loser:

- (Japan) Ryōko Fuda
- (Japan) Erika Takao

== Doubles main-draw entrants ==
=== Seeds ===
Country	Player	Country	Player	Rank^{1}	Seed
CHN	Li Ting	CHN	Sun Tiantian	63^{PR}	1
TPE	Hsieh Su-wei	CHN	Yan Zi	116	2
FIN	Emma Laine	CZE	Vladimíra Uhlířová	152	3
IND	Sania Mirza	THA	Tamarine Tanasugarn	174	4

- ^{1} Rankings are as of October 2, 2006

== Champions ==
=== Singles ===
- (United States) Vania King def. (Thailand) Tamarine Tanasugarn 2–6, 6–4, 6–4

=== Doubles ===
- (United States) Vania King / (Croatia) Jelena Kostanić def. (Argentina) Mariana Díaz Oliva / (South Africa) Natalie Grandin 7–5, 2–6, 7–5
