= Bangkok Open =

PTT Bangkok Open

Defunct tennis tournament
- Founded: 2005
- Abolished: 2007
- Editions: 3
- Location: Bangkok; Thailand
- Venue: Rama Gardens Hotel (2005–2006); National Tennis Development Centre (2007)
- Category: Tier 3
- Surface: Hard / Outdoors
- Draw: 32M/32Q/16D
- Prize money: $200,000

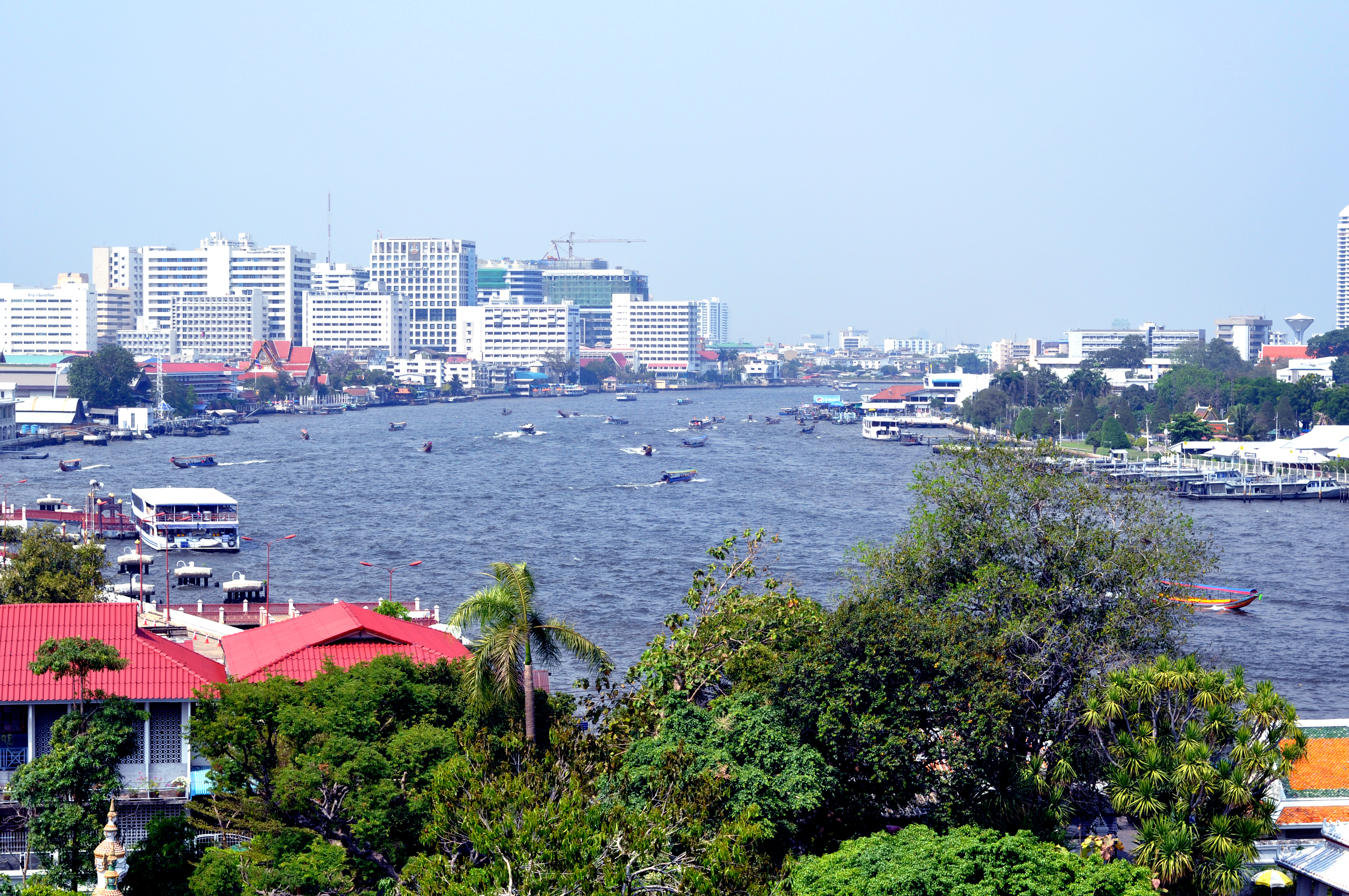
The open space used for the women's tennis tournament held in Bangkok, Thailand. Held from 2005 to 2007

The PTT Bangkok Open was a women's tennis tournament held in Bangkok, Thailand. Held from 2005 to 2007, this WTA Tour event was a Tier III-tournament and was played on outdoor hardcourts.

== Finals ==
=== Singles ===
Year	Champion	Runner-up	Score
2005	(Czech Republic) Nicole Vaidišová	(Russia) Nadia Petrova	6–1, 6–7^{(5–7)}, 7–5
2006	(United States) Vania King	(Thailand) Tamarine Tanasugarn	2–6, 6–4, 6–4
2007	(Italy) Flavia Pennetta	(Chinese Taipei) Chan Yung-jan	6–1, 6–3

=== Doubles ===
Year	Champions	Runners-up	Score
2005	(Japan) Shinobu Asagoe (Argentina) Gisela Dulko	(Spain) Conchita Martínez (Spain) Virginia Ruano Pascual	6–1, 7–5
2006	(United States) Vania King (Croatia) Jelena Kostanić	(Argentina) Mariana Díaz Oliva (South Africa) Natalie Grandin	7–5, 2–6, 7–5
2007	(China) Sun Tiantian (China) Yan Zi	(Japan) Ayumi Morita (Japan) Junri Namigata	Walkover

== See also ==
- 2005 PTT Bangkok Open
- 2006 PTT Bangkok Open
- 2007 PTT Bangkok Open
- Bangkok Tennis Classic – men's tournament
- List of tennis tournaments
