= Sophia Mulsap =

Thai tennis player

- Country (sports): Thailand
- Born: 6 June 1990 (age 34); Bangkok, Thailand
- Retired: 2009
- Plays: Right-handed
- Prize money: $10,583

Singles
- Career record: 18–40
- Career titles: 0
- Highest ranking: No. 791 (6 October 2008)

Grand Slam singles results
- Australian Open Junior: 1R (2008)

Doubles
- Career record: 41–44
- Career titles: 2 ITF
- Highest ranking: No. 246 (19 May 2008)

Grand Slam doubles results
- Australian Open Junior: QF (2008)

Sophia Mulsap (born 6 June 1990) is a former Thai tennis player.

Mulsap has career-high WTA rankings of 791 in singles, achieved on 6 October 2008, and 246 in doubles, set on 19 May 2008. She won two doubles titles on the ITF Women's Circuit. Her only WTA Tour main-draw appearance came at the 2007 Bangkok Open, where she partnered Varatchaya Wongteanchai in the doubles event.

== ITF finals ==
$10,000 tournaments

=== Doubles (2 titles, 3 runner–ups) ===
Result	W–L	Date	Tournament	Tier	Surface	Partnering	Opponents	Score
Win	1–0	July 2007	ITF Khon Kaen, Thailand	10,000	Hard	(Thailand) Varatchaya Wongteanchai	(Philippines) Denise Dy (Thailand) Nungnadda Wannasuk	6–4, 6–2
Win	2–0	July 2007	ITF Bangkok, Thailand	10,000	Hard	(Thailand) Varatchaya Wongteanchai	(Thailand) Noppawan Lertcheewakarn (Thailand) Napaporn Tongsalee	4–6, 6–4, 6–1
Loss	2–1	August 2007	ITF Noida, India	10,000	Carpet	(Thailand) Varatchaya Wongteanchai	(India) Ankita Bhambri (India) Sanaa Bhambri	1–6, 4–6
Loss	2–2	August 2007	ITF New Delhi, India	10,000	Hard	(Thailand) Varatchaya Wongteanchai	(India) Tara Iyer (Thailand) Nungnadda Wannasuk	4–6, 3–6
Loss	2–3	August 2008	ITF Chiang Mai, Thailand	10,000	Hard	(Thailand) Varatchaya Wongteanchai	(China) Chen Yanchong (Chinese Taipei) Chen Yi	5–7, 3–6

== ITF Junior finals ==
Category B1
Category G2
Category G3
Category G4
Category G5

=== Singles (1–2) ===
Result	W–L	Date	Tournament	Grade	Surface	Opponent	Score
Loss	0–1	Jun 2006	Jakarta, Indonesia	G4	Hard	(Indonesia) Lutfiana-Aris Budiharto	4–6, 2–6
Win	1–1	Jul 2006	Bangkok, Thailand	G4	Hard	(Thailand) Nicha Lertpitaksinchai	6–0, 6–1
Loss	1–2	Nov 2006	Bangkok, Thailand	G4	Hard	(China) Zhou Yimiao	1–6, 0–6

=== Doubles (6–5) ===
Result	W–L	Date	Tournament	Grade	Surface	Partner	Opponents	Score
Win	1–0	Sep 2003	Colombo, Sri Lanka	G5	Clay	(Thailand) Penporn Chantawannop	(Sri Lanka) Thiyumi Abeysinghe (Sri Lanka) Mahesha Seneviratne	6–1, 6–3
Win	2–0	Jul 2005	Bangkok, Thailand	G5	Hard	(Hong Kong) Yang Zi-jun	(Thailand) Penporn Chantawannop (Thailand) Varanya Vijuksanaboon	6–3, 6–4
Win	3–0	Jul 2006	Bangkok, Thailand	G4	Hard	(Thailand) Khunpak Issara	(Thailand) Nicha Lertpitaksinchai (Thailand) Uthumporn Pudtra	1–6, 6–2, 6–2
Loss	3–1	Jul 2006	Bangkok, Thailand	G4	Hard	(Thailand) Khunpak Issara	(Thailand) Varunya Wongteanchai (Thailand) Varatchaya Wongteanchai	4–6, 6–1, 6–7
Win	4–1	Sep 2006	Sarawak, Malaysia	G3	Hard	(Thailand) Khunpak Issara	(Chinese Taipei) Huang Hui-chi (Chinese Taipei) Lin Szu-yu	6–3, 6–1
Win	5–1	Sep 2006	Kuala Lumpur, Malaysia	G4	Hard	(Thailand) Khunpak Issara	(Chinese Taipei) Chen Mu-ying (Chinese Taipei) Li Meng-lin	6–3, 6–3
Loss	5–2	Nov 2006	Bangkok, Thailand	G4	Hard	(Thailand) Khunpak Issara	(China) Xuan-Yu Guo (China) Zhou Yimiao	3–6, 1–6
Loss	5–3	Jan 2007	New Delhi, India	G2	Hard	(Thailand) Khunpak Issara	(Ukraine) Julia Goloborodko (Ukraine) Anastasiya Vasylyeva	3–6, 4–6
Win	6–3	Mar 2007	Jakarta, Indonesia	G2	Hard	(Thailand) Noppawan Lertcheewakarn	(Italy) Gioia Barbieri (Russia) Elena Chernyakova	6–1, 3–6, 6–4
Loss	6–4	Sep 2007	Huzhou, China	G3	Hard	(Thailand) Khunpak Issara	(Ukraine) Lyudmyla Kichenok (Ukraine) Nadiia Kichenok	3–6, 3–6
Loss	6–5	Nov 2007	New Delhi, India	B1	Hard	(Thailand) Noppawan Lertcheewakarn	(Uzbekistan) Alexandra Kolesnichenko (India) Poojashree Venkatesha	2–6, 4–6
