= 2005 PTT Bangkok Open – Singles =

Singles
- 2005 PTT Bangkok Open

Final
- Champion: (Czech Republic) Nicole Vaidišová
- Runner-up: (Russia) Nadia Petrova
- Score: 6–1, 6–7^{(5–7)}, 7–5

Details
- Draw: 32
- Seeds: 8

Events
Singles	Doubles
- PTT Bangkok Open

This was the first edition of the tournament.

Nicole Vaidišová won in the final, beating Nadia Petrova, 6–1, 6–7^{(5–7)}, 7–5.

== Seeds ==
1. (Russia) Nadia Petrova (final)
2. (Czech Republic) Nicole Vaidišová (champion)
3. (Argentina) Gisela Dulko (semifinals)
4. (Japan) Shinobu Asagoe (first round)
5. (India) Sania Mirza (second round, retired due to a lower-back strain)
6. (Spain) Conchita Martínez (quarterfinals)
7. (France) Marion Bartoli (withdrew due to a wrist injury)
8. (Israel) Shahar Pe'er (quarterfinals)

== Draw ==
Key

- Q = Qualifier
- WC = Wild card
- LL = Lucky loser
- Alt = Alternate
- ITF = ITF entry
- PR = Protected ranking
- SR = Special ranking
- SE = Special exempt
- JE = Junior exempt
- JR = Junior Accelerator Programme entrant
- CO = College Accelerator Programme entrant
- NG = Next Gen Accelerator Program entrant
- w/o = Walkover
- r = Retired
- d = Defaulted

=== Finals ===
Semifinals
1	(Russia) Nadia Petrova	3	6	6
(Italy) Antonella Serra Zanetti	6	2	4
3	(Argentina) Gisela Dulko	6	0	6^{3}
2	(Czech Republic) Nicole Vaidišová	3	6	7^{7}

Final
1	(Russia) Nadia Petrova	1	7^{7}	5
2	(Czech Republic) Nicole Vaidišová	6	6^{5}	7

=== Top half ===
First round
1	(Russia) N Petrova	6	6
(Spain) N Llagostera Vives	1	2
(United States) M Washington	2	3
Q	(Japan) S Obata	6	6
(South Korea) Y-j Cho	4	1
(Slovakia) M Suchá	6	6
Q	(France) S Foretz	6	6
LL	(Germany) M Müller	2	0
4	(Japan) S Asagoe	6^{2}	4
(Italy) A Serra Zanetti	7^{7}	6
Q	(Hungary) M Czink	6	4	6
(Italy) T Garbin	3	6	1
(Serbia and Montenegro) A Timotić	6^{4}	1
LL	(United States) S Perry	7^{7}	6
(France) S Brémond	3	4
8	(Israel) S Pe'er	6	6

Second round
1	(Russia) N Petrova	6	6
Q	(Japan) S Obata	3	2
(Slovakia) M Suchá	6^{7}	3
Q	(France) S Foretz	7^{9}	6
(Italy) A Serra Zanetti	6	6
Q	(Hungary) M Czink	3	3
LL	(United States) S Perry	4	7	6^{2}
8	(Israel) S Pe'er	6	5	7^{7}

Quarterfinals
1	(Russia) N Petrova	6	6
Q	(France) S Foretz	4	0
(Italy) A Serra Zanetti	6	3	6
8	(Israel) S Pe'er	3	6	2

Semifinals
1	(Russia) N Petrova	3	6	6
(Italy) A Serra Zanetti	6	2	4

=== Bottom half ===
First round
5	(India) S Mirza	6	4	6
(Slovakia) H Nagyová	1	6	0
(China) M Yuan	6	4	6
(Japan) A Nakamura	2	6	3
(Japan) R Fujiwara	5	6^{5}
WC	(Spain) V Ruano Pascual	7	7^{7}
(United States) J Jackson	4	5
3	(Argentina) G Dulko	6	7
6	(Spain) C Martínez	6	6
(Thailand) T Tanasugarn	3	2
(Venezuela) M Vento-Kabchi	3	2
(Colombia) C Castaño	6	6
WC	(Thailand) S Viratprasert	6	7^{7}
Q	(Chinese Taipei) S-w Hsieh	2	6^{1}
(United States) A Spears	5	2
2	(Czech Republic) N Vaidišová	7	6

Second round
5	(India) S Mirza	5	r
(China) M Yuan	7
WC	(Spain) V Ruano Pascual	2	3
3	(Argentina) G Dulko	6	6
6	(Spain) C Martínez	6	6
(Colombia) C Castaño	2	0
WC	(Thailand) S Viratprasert	3	1
2	(Czech Republic) N Vaidišová	6	6

Quarterfinals
(China) M Yuan	6	3	2
3	(Argentina) G Dulko	4	6	6
6	(Spain) C Martínez	3	0
2	(Czech Republic) N Vaidišová	6	6

Semifinals
3	(Argentina) G Dulko	6	0	6^{3}
2	(Czech Republic) N Vaidišová	3	6	7^{7}
