= Zhu Aiwen =

Chinese tennis player

Zhu Aiwen 朱皑雯
- Country (sports): China
- Born: 22 September 1994 (age 30); Wuxi, China
- Plays: Right handed (two-handed backhand)
- College: University of Nevada
- Prize money: $17,694

Singles
- Career record: 44–62
- Career titles: 0
- Highest ranking: No. 738 (5 November 2012)

Doubles
- Career record: 55–55
- Career titles: 3 ITF
- Highest ranking: No. 395 (12 May 2014)

Zhu Aiwen (Chinese: 朱皑雯; pinyin: Zhū Áiwén; Mandarin pronunciation: [ʈʂú ǎɪ wə̌n]; born 22 September 1994), also known as Angelina Zhu, is a Chinese former tennis player.

Zhu has a career-high doubles ranking of 395 by the WTA, achieved on 12 May 2014. She won three doubles titles at tournaments of the ITF Women's Circuit.

Zhu made her WTA Tour main-draw debut at the 2016 Jiangxi International Open, in the doubles event, partnering Sun Ziyue.

== ITF finals ==
=== Doubles (3–4) ===
Legend
$60,000 tournaments
$25,000 tournaments
$10,000 tournaments

Result	No.	Date	Location	Surface	Partner	Opponents	Score
Win	1.	26 May 2013	Sharm El Sheikh, Egypt	Hard	(Italy) Camilla Rosatello	(United Kingdom) Anna Fitzpatrick (Kazakhstan) Kamila Kerimbayeva	6–4, 6–3
Loss	2.	7 July 2013	Solo, Indonesia	Hard	(Indonesia) Aldila Sutjiadi	(Indonesia) Beatrice Gumulya (Indonesia) Jessy Rompies	2–6, 4–6
Loss	3.	1 November 2013	Benicarló, Spain	Clay	(India) Sowjanya Bavisetti	(Argentina) Tatiana Búa (Spain) Lucía Cervera Vázquez	3–6, 0–6
Loss	4.	8 November 2013	Vinaròs, Spain	Clay	(India) Sowjanya Bavisetti	(Argentina) Tatiana Búa (Spain) Lucía Cervera Vázquez	3–6, 2–6
Loss	5.	22 November 2013	Castellón, Spain	Clay	(Spain) Lucía Cervera Vázquez	(Italy) Martina Colmegna (Germany) Anna Klasen	1–6, 7–5, [5–10]
Win	6.	22 March 2015	Jiangmen, China	Hard	(China) You Xiaodi	(China) Xin Yuan (China) Ye Qiuyu	4–6, 7–5, [10–4]
Win	7.	14 June 2015	Anning Open, China	Clay	(India) Sowjanya Bavisetti	(China) Gai Ao (China) Sheng Yuqi	7–6, 0–6, [10–7]
