= 2006 PTT Bangkok Open – Doubles =

Doubles
- 2006 PTT Bangkok Open

Final
- Champions: (United States) Vania King (Croatia) Jelena Kostanić
- Runners-up: (Argentina) Mariana Díaz Oliva (South Africa) Natalie Grandin
- Score: 7–5, 2–6, 7–5

Events
Singles	Doubles
- PTT Bangkok Open

Shinobu Asagoe and Gisela Dulko were the defending champions, but both players decided not to participate in 2006.

Vania King and Jelena Kostanić won the title, defeating Mariana Díaz Oliva and Natalie Grandin in the final.

== Seeds ==
1. (China) Li Ting / (China) Sun Tiantian (first round)
2. (Chinese Taipei) Hsieh Su-wei / (China) Yan Zi (first round)
3. (Finland) Emma Laine / (Czech Republic) Vladimíra Uhlířová (first round)
4. (India) Sania Mirza / (Thailand) Tamarine Tanasugarn (first round, withdrew because of Mirza's stomach illness)

== Draw ==
Key

- Q = Qualifier
- WC = Wild card
- LL = Lucky loser
- Alt = Alternate
- ITF = ITF entry
- PR = Protected ranking
- SR = Special ranking
- SE = Special exempt
- JE = Junior exempt
- JR = Junior Accelerator Programme entrant
- CO = College Accelerator Programme entrant
- NG = Next Gen Accelerator Program entrant
- w/o = Walkover
- r = Retired
- d = Defaulted

=== Draw ===
First round
1	(China) T Li (China) T Sun	3	4
(Chinese Taipei) C-j Chuang (United States) J Jackson	6	6
(Greece) E Daniilidou (Australia) A Molik	2	6	6
(Austria) S Bammer (Hungary) M Czink	6	2	1
4	(India) S Mirza (Thailand) T Tanasugarn
(Russia) A Jidkova (China) M Yuan	w/o
(Czech Republic) L Šafářová (Czech Republic) K Zakopalová	1	2
(Argentina) M Díaz Oliva (South Africa) N Grandin	6	6
(Thailand) N Lertcheewakarn (Thailand) V Wongteanchai	1	4
(Australia) N Pratt (India) S Uberoi	6	6
(Colombia) C Castaño (Poland) M Domachowska	6	6
3	(Finland) E Laine (Czech Republic) V Uhlířová	4	4
(Thailand) N Tongsalee (South Korea) M Yoo	2	5
(United States) V King (Croatia) J Kostanić	6	7
(France) S Brémond (Tunisia) S Sfar	6	2	6
2	(Chinese Taipei) S-w Hsieh (China) Z Yan	3	6	4

Quarterfinals
(Chinese Taipei) C-j Chuang (United States) J Jackson	w/o
(Greece) E Daniilidou (Australia) A Molik
(Russia) A Jidkova (China) M Yuan	2	3
(Argentina) M Díaz Oliva (South Africa) N Grandin	6	6
(Australia) N Pratt (India) S Uberoi	7	3	6
(Colombia) C Castaño (Poland) M Domachowska	5	6	3
(United States) V King (Croatia) J Kostanić	6
(France) S Brémond (Tunisia) S Sfar	2	r

Semifinals
(Chinese Taipei) C-j Chuang (United States) J Jackson	1^{r}
(Argentina) M Díaz Oliva (South Africa) N Grandin	4
(Australia) N Pratt (India) S Uberoi	2	7^{7}	1
(United States) V King (Croatia) J Kostanić	6	6^{5}	6

Final
(Argentina) M Díaz Oliva (South Africa) N Grandin	5	6	5
(United States) V King (Croatia) J Kostanić	7	2	7
