= Vania King =

American tennis player (born 1989)

Vania King (金久慈)
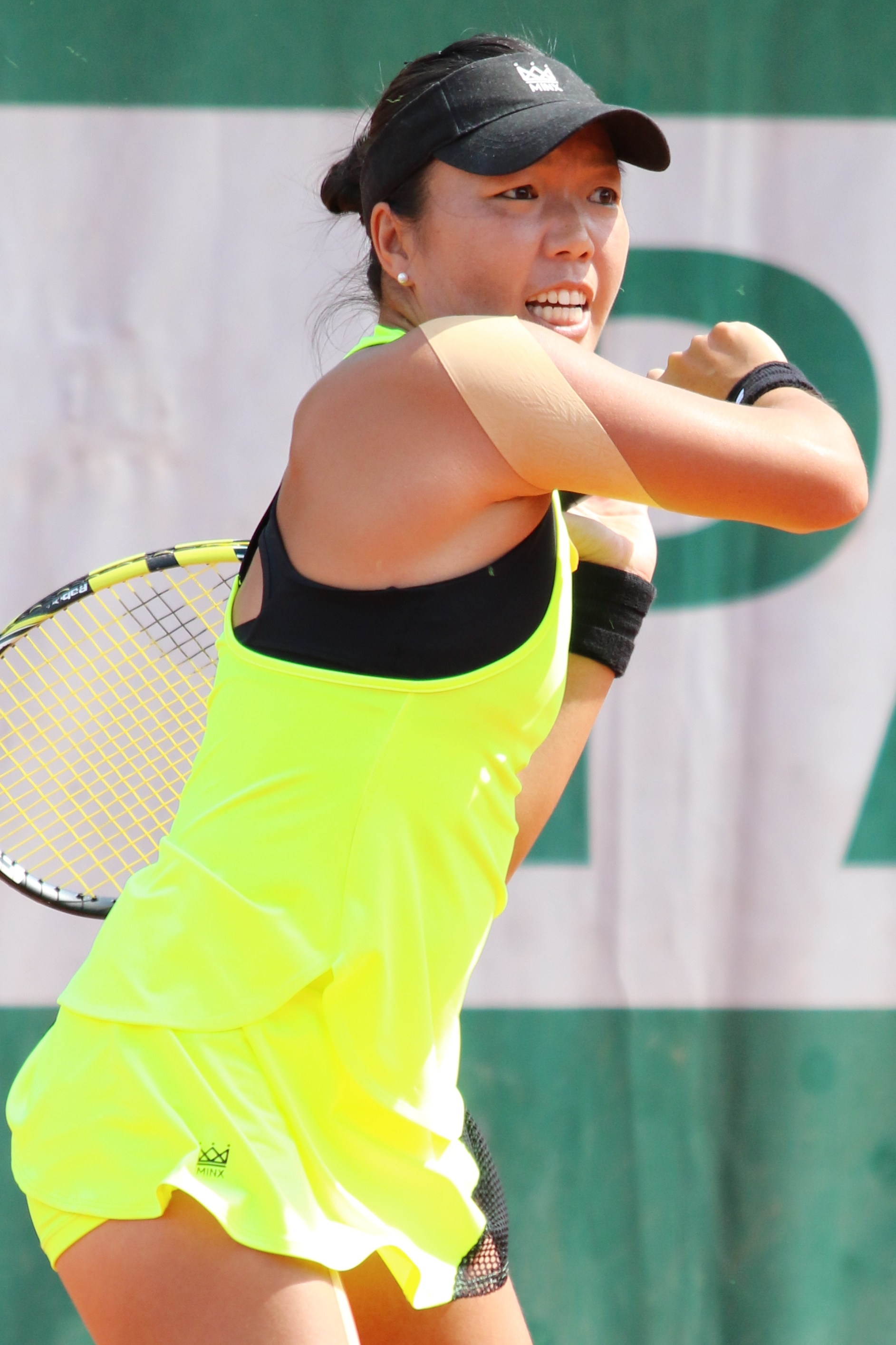
- King at the 2018 French Open
- Country (sports): United States
- Residence: Boynton Beach, Florida, U.S.
- Born: February 3, 1989 (age 36) Monterey Park, California, U.S.
- Height: 5 ft 4 in (1.63 m)
- Turned pro: July 2006
- Retired: April 6, 2021
- Plays: Right-handed (two-handed backhand)
- Prize money: $4,556,888

Singles
- Career record: 269–250
- Career titles: 1
- Highest ranking: No. 50 (November 6, 2006)

Grand Slam singles results
- Australian Open: 3R (2012)
- French Open: 3R (2011)
- Wimbledon: 2R (2006, 2009)
- US Open: 3R (2009, 2011)

Doubles
- Career record: 324–204
- Career titles: 15
- Highest ranking: No. 3 (June 6, 2011)

Grand Slam doubles results
- Australian Open: QF (2012, 2016, 2018)
- French Open: SF (2011)
- Wimbledon: W (2010)
- US Open: W (2010)

Other doubles tournaments
- Tour Finals: SF (2010, 2011)

Grand Slam mixed doubles results
- Australian Open: 2R (2018)
- French Open: F (2009)
- Wimbledon: 2R (2007, 2014)
- US Open: QF (2006)

Team competitions
- Fed Cup: 5–7

Vania King
- Chinese: 金久慈
Transcriptions
Standard Mandarin
- Hanyu Pinyin: Jīn Jiǔcí
- Bopomofo: ㄐㄧㄣ ㄐㄧㄡˇ ㄘˊ
- Gwoyeu Romatzyh: Jin Jeoutsyr
- Wade–Giles: Chin^{1} Chiu^{3}tzʻu^{2}
- Tongyong Pinyin: Jin Jiǒucíh
- Yale Romanization: Jīn Jyǒutsź
- MPS2: Jīn Jiǒu-tsź
- IPA: [tɕín tɕjòʊ tsʰɹ̩̌]

Vania King (born February 3, 1989) is a retired American tennis player. A former top-10 doubles player, King won both the Wimbledon and US Open women's doubles titles in 2010 with partner Yaroslava Shvedova, with whom she also reached the final of the 2011 US Open. She won a total of 15 doubles titles on the WTA Tour and reached a career-high ranking of No. 3 in the world. She also ended runner-up in the mixed-doubles final at the French Open in 2009, with Marcelo Melo.

In singles, King has been ranked as high as No. 50 in the world. Her biggest accomplishments included a WTA Tour title at the 2006 Bangkok Open and two runner-up finishes at the 2013 Guangzhou International and 2016 Jianxi International. She also progressed as far as the third round in Grand Slam tournaments, doing so on four occasions (the 2009 US Open, the 2011 French Open, the 2011 US Open, and the 2012 Australian Open).

King announced her retirement on April 6, 2021

== Personal life ==
King's parents moved to the United States from Taiwan in 1982. She is the youngest of four children. Her brother Phillip was a two-time All-American at Duke University and two-time US junior champion. Vania is a graduate of Long Beach Poly High School in California.

== Tennis career ==
=== 2006–2009 ===
In 2006, King won her only WTA Tour singles title at the Bangkok Open, a Tier-III tournament where she defeated Tamarine Tanasugarn in the final. In November, she achieved her career-high singles ranking of world No. 50.

In 2009, she reached the mixed-doubles final at the French Open alongside Brazilian player Marcelo Melo, losing to top-seeded team Liezel Huber/Bob Bryan.

King lost in the second round of the 2009 Wimbledon Championships to No. 15, Flavia Pennetta. She played in the ladies' doubles with Anna-Lena Grönefeld, losing in the quarterfinals to eventual champions Venus and Serena Williams.

At the US Open, King was granted a wildcard and had her best singles Grand Slam performance. She was defeated in the third round by world No. 22, Daniela Hantuchová.

=== 2010 ===
King began the year ranked No. 80 in the world at the Brisbane International. She reached the second round of the singles tournament, losing to Andrea Petkovic. In doubles, she partnered with Anna-Lena Grönefeld and lost in the first round to Timea Bacsinszky and Tathiana Garbin. King and Grönefeld fared better at the Sydney International, where they were seeded fourth. They lost in the semifinals to Garbin and Nadia Petrova. In the singles tournament, King failed to qualify, losing in the first round of the qualifying tournament to top seed Ágnes Szávay, who went on to defeat Jelena Janković in the first round of the tournament.

At the Australian Open, King lost in the second round to Roberta Vinci. In doubles, she partnered with Grönefeld again and entered the tournament seeded 14th. They lost in the second round to Svetlana Kuznetsova and Victoria Azarenka.

King's next bigger tournament was the Memphis Cup in mid-February. She entered the singles draw seeded seventh and lost in the second round to Sofia Arvidsson. In the doubles tournament, she and partner Michaëlla Krajicek were seeded third and won the title without dropping a set, defeating Bethanie Mattek-Sands and Shaughnessy in the final.

King then traveled to the Monterrey Open. In doubles, she reunited with Grönefeld and reached the final as the top seed, falling to second-seeded pair Benešová/Záhlavová. In singles, she lost in the quarterfinals to second seed Daniela Hantuchová. At the Indian Wells Open, King lost in the second round to No. 2, Caroline Wozniacki. She did not enter the doubles tournament. She fared better in the Miami Open later that month. King partnered with Julie Coin and reached the quarterfinals of the doubles tournament, before losing to third seeds Petrova and Samantha Stosur, who went on to become the runners-up.

Her next Premier event was the Charleston Open, where she reunited with Krajicek and reached the final, before falling to top seeds Huber and Petrova. In singles, she lost to Petrova in the second round. At the Madrid Open, King paired with Chuang Chia-jung for the first time for the doubles tournament. They defeated fourth seeds Huber and Anabel Medina Garrigues, before falling in the quarterfinals to Pe'er and Francesca Schiavone. In singles, King lost in the first round to Karolina Šprem. She then entered the Strasbourg International. In the doubles tournament, she partnered with Alizé Cornet and won the title after an injury to Lucie Hradecká forced top seeds Hradecká/Chuang to retire in the second round. King/Cornet defeated second seeds Rodionova/Kudryavtseva in the final for her tenth tour doubles title. In singles, King defeated second seed Elena Vesnina in the first round and reached the semifinals, falling there to Kristina Barrois.

At the French Open, she lost in the first round to Mattek-Sands. She entered the mixed-doubles tournament with Christopher Kas, reaching the semifinals, before falling to Shvedova and Julian Knowle. In women's doubles with Krajicek, she reached the second round losing to fourth-seeded Petrova and Stosur.

At Wimbledon, King won the ladies' doubles title in straight sets with Yaroslava Shvedova. They defeated Elena Vesnina and Vera Zvonareva in the final. At the US Open, King and Shvedova won their second Grand Slam doubles title, defeating the second-seeded pair Huber/Petrova in a rain-delayed final. At the Stanford Classic, Vania lost to Sorana Cîrstea.

=== 2011 ===
King and Shvedova made the finals of the US Open, losing to Liezel Huber and Lisa Raymond.

King made it to the finals of five other WTA tournaments in the course of the year, one in Monterrey with Grönefeld and in Rome, Cincinnati, Osaka, and Moscow with Shvedova. She and Shvedova won the events in Cincinnati in August and Moscow in October.

=== 2012 ===
King reached the third round of the Australian Open at the start of the year, losing to Ana Ivanovic. She had defeated Kateryna Bondarenko in the first round.

She reached the second round of the Carlsbad Open in July, losing to Marion Bartoli.

In doubles, she reached the final in Stanford with Jarmila Gajdošová and in Carlsbad with Nadia Petrova, but lost to Marina Erakovic and Heather Watson in Stanford and to Raquel Kops-Jones and Abigail Spears in Carlsbad.

=== 2013 ===
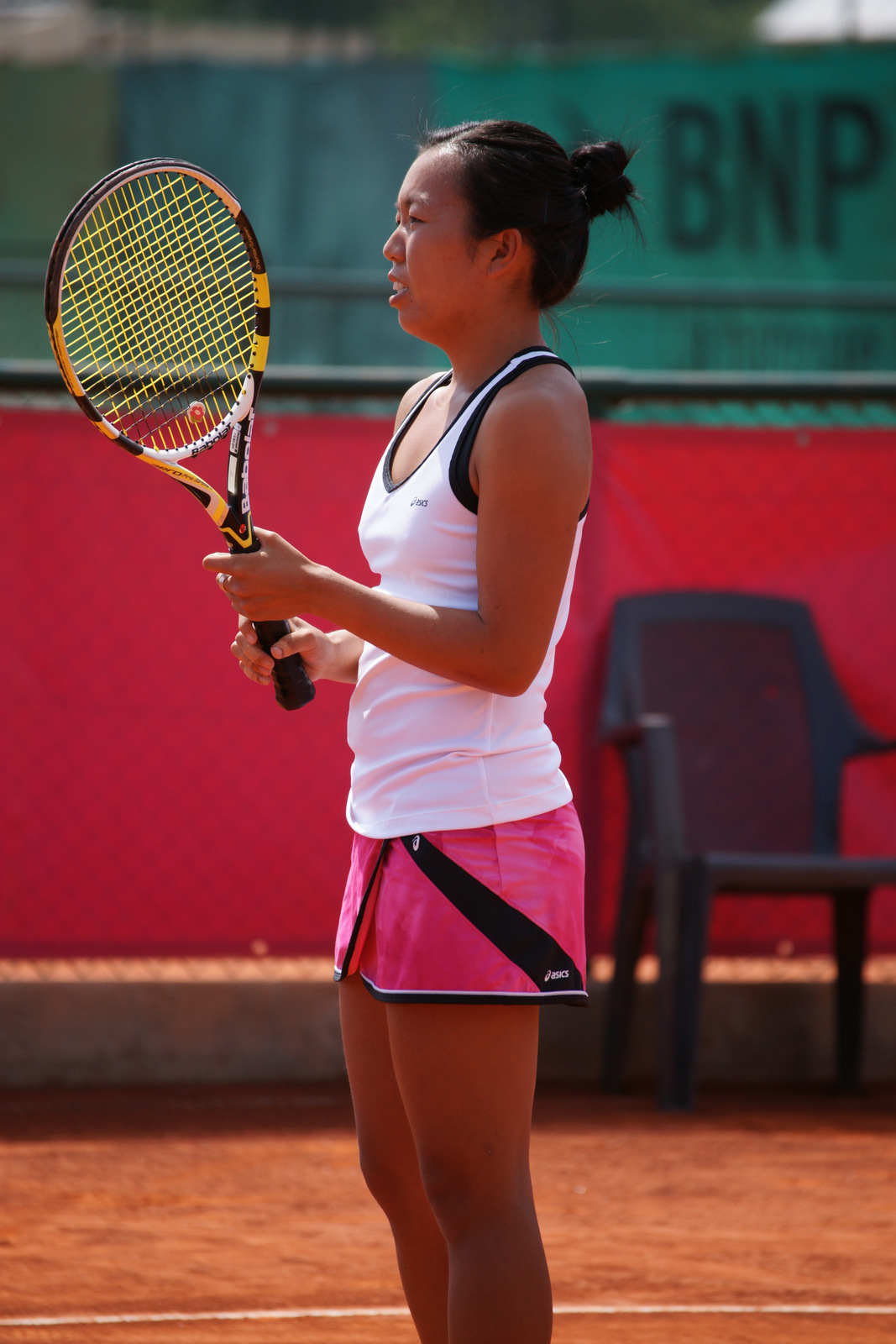
King at Cagnes-sur-Mer, 2013

In singles action, King lost in the Guangzhou final to Zhang Shuai. King lost in the second round of the French Open and in the first round of the other three Slans. In doubles that year, her best finish was a finals loss in Guangzhou.

=== 2014 ===
In doubles, King made the second round at the Australian Open partnering Galina Voskoboeva. They lost to the Czech/Dutch pair of Hradecká and Krajicek.

She partnered with Barbora Strýcová in Florianópolis, and they made it to the semifinals before being defeated by Medina Garrigues and Shvedova. She was eliminated in the first round in Indian Wells, and the second round in Miami, but made it to the final in Bogotá, partnering Chanelle Scheepers of South Africa.

Partnering Zheng Jie, she made a quarterfinal appearance in Madrid, losing to Sara Errani and Roberta Vinci. Then followed a series of first-round losses, including Roland Garros and Wimbledon.

She had some success in the late summer, making the quarterfinals in Washington, partnering Taylor Townsend, and the third round at the US Open, partnering Lisa Raymond.

In singles, she made the semifinals in Shenzhen, but had to concede a walkover. She made a first-round exit at the Australian Open at the hands of Carla Suárez Navarro. At the Pattaya Open, she was defeated by Elena Vesnina in the first round. A series of first-round defeats followed in Rio de Janeiro, Florianópolis, and Indian Wells.

She made the second round in Miami and Charleston, but it was not until April in Bogotá that she found some form and made it to the semifinals. She went down in the first round in both Roland Garros and Wimbledon, but she did make the quarterfinals in Washington, D.C.

At the US Open, she defeated Francesca Schiavone in the first round, but lost to eventual champion Serena Williams in the second.

=== 2015 ===
King missed the first three majors of 2015 due to injury. She lost in the first round of singles and the second round of doubles there in Flushing. The highlight of her year came on hardcourts in Waco, where King and Nicole Gibbs won in November, defeating Julia Glushko and Rebecca Peterson.

=== 2017 ===
King reunited with the doubles partner with whom she had had the most success, Yaroslava Shvedova. They made it to the semifinals in Sydney where they lost to Sania Mirza and Barbora Strýcová.

At the Australian Open, King and Shvedova advanced to the third round, where they lost to Mirjana Lučić-Baroni and Andrea Petkovic. They were stopped in the second round of Indian Wells by the Japanese/Chinese pair of Shuko Aoyama and Yang Zhaoxuan. In Miami, they went on to the quarterfinals, where they again lost to Mirza and Strýcová.

== Performance timelines ==
Key
W	F	SF	QF	#R	RR	Q#	P#	DNQ	A	Z#	PO	G	S	B	NMS	NTI	P	NH

(W) winner; (F) finalist; (SF) semifinalist; (QF) quarterfinalist; (#R) rounds 4, 3, 2, 1; (RR) round-robin stage; (Q#) qualification round; (P#) preliminary round; (DNQ) did not qualify; (A) absent; (Z#) Davis/Fed Cup Zonal Group (with number indication) or (PO) play-off; (G) gold, (S) silver or (B) bronze Olympic/Paralympic medal; (NMS) not a Masters tournament; (NTI) not a Tier I tournament; (P) postponed; (NH) not held; (SR) strike rate (events won / competed); (W–L) win–loss record.

=== Singles ===
Tournament	2005	2006	2007	2008	2009	2010	2011	2012	2013	2014	2015	2016	2017	2018	W–L
Grand Slam tournaments
Australian Open	A	Q3	1R	1R	Q2	2R	2R	3R	1R	1R	A	2R	1R	A	5–9
French Open	A	1R	1R	2R	Q2	1R	3R	2R	2R	1R	A	Q2	A	1R	5–9
Wimbledon	A	2R	1R	1R	2R	1R	1R	1R	1R	1R	A	Q3	A	A	2–9
US Open	2R	2R	1R	1R	3R	2R	3R	1R	1R	2R	1R	2R	A	2R	10–13
Win–loss	1–1	2–3	0–4	1–4	3–2	2–4	5–4	3–4	1–4	1–4	0–1	2–2	0–1	1–2	22–40
WTA 1000
Indian Wells Open	A	3R	2R	2R	1R	2R	1R	3R	1R	1R	A	2R	1R	A	8–11
Miami Open	A	2R	2R	2R	Q1	1R	1R	2R	Q1	2R	A	2R	A	A	6–8
Madrid Open	Not Held				Q1	Q1	2R	1R	A	Q1	A	A	A	A	1–2
Italian Open	A	A	A	A	1R	A	1R	2R	A	Q1	A	2R	A	A	2–4
Canadian Open	A	A	A	1R	Q1	2R	1R	A	Q1	A	A	A	A	A	1–3
Cincinnati Open	Not held		Not Tier I		A	1R	1R	1R	2R	A	A	A	A	Q1	1–4
Pan Pacific/Wuhan Open	Not Tier I				Q1	A	3R	1R	A	A	A	A	A	Q2	2–2
China Open	Not held		Not Tier 1		2R	A	A	1R	A	A	A	Q1	A	A	1–2

=== Doubles ===
Tournament	2005	2006	2007	2008	2009	2010	2011	2012	2013	2014	2015	2016	2017	2018	2019	2020	2021	SR	W–L
Grand Slam tournaments
Australian Open	A	A	2R	1R	1R	2R	1R	QF	1R	2R	A	QF	3R	QF	1R	1R	A	0 / 13	14–13
French Open	A	1R	1R	1R	3R	2R	SF	QF	3R	1R	A	1R	A	3R	A	A	A	0 / 11	14–11
Wimbledon	A	1R	1R	3R	QF	W	2R	1R	3R	1R	A	2R	A	3R	A	NH	A	1 / 11	17–10
US Open	1R	2R	3R	1R	3R	W	F	3R	2R	3R	2R	3R	A	1R	SF	A	A	1 / 14	28–13
Win–loss	0–1	1–3	3–4	2–4	7–4	14–2	10–4	8–4	5–4	3–4	1–1	6–4	2–1	7–4	4–2	0–1	0–0	2 / 49	73–47
Year-end championships
WTA Tour Championships	Did not qualify					SF	SF	Did not qualify								NH	DNQ	0 / 2	0–2
WTA 1000
Indian Wells Open	A	A	QF	1R	1R	A	QF	2R	1R	1R	A	QF	2R	QF	A	NH	A	0 / 10	10–10
Miami Open	A	A	2R	1R	1R	QF	1R	SF	1R	2R	A	QF	QF	2R	A	NH	1R	0 / 12	12–12
Madrid Open	Not Held				2R	QF	SF	1R	A	QF	A	SF	A	A	A	NH	A	0 / 6	11–6
Italian Open	A	A	A	A	A	A	F	2R	A	1R	A	1R	A	QF	A	A	A	0 / 5	7–5
Canadian Open	A	A	A	2R	1R	2R	A	A	1R	A	A	A	A	A	A	NH	A	0 / 4	2–4
Cincinnati Open	Not Tier I				A	2R	W	A	2R	A	A	QF	A	1R	A	A	A	1 / 5	8–4
Pan Pacific/Wuhan Open	A	A	F	W	1R	1R	SF	1R	A	A	A	A	A	2R	2R	NH		1 / 8	11–6
China Open	Not Tier I				1R	SF	SF	2R	2R	A	A	2R	A	A	1R	NH		0 / 7	7–7

=== Mixed doubles ===
Tournament	2004	2005	2006	2007	2008	2009	2010	2011	2012	2013	2014	...	2017	2018	W–L
Australian Open	A	A	A	A	1R	A	A	1R	A	1R	A		1R	2R	1–5
French Open	A	A	A	1R	A	F	SF	1R	A	A	A		A	2R	8–5
Wimbledon	A	A	A	2R	1R	1R	1R	1R	A	A	2R		A	1R	2–7
US Open	1R	A	QF	2R	A	1R	1R	1R	A	A	A		A	1R	3–7
Win–loss	0–1	0–0	2–1	2–3	0–2	4–3	3–3	0–4	0–0	0–1	1–1		0–1	2–4	14–24

== Significant finals ==
=== Grand Slam tournaments ===
==== Doubles: 3 (2 titles, 1 runner-up) ====
Result	Year	Championship	Surface	Partner	Opponents	Score
Win	2010	Wimbledon	Grass	(Kazakhstan) Yaroslava Shvedova	(Russia) Elena Vesnina; (Russia) Vera Zvonareva	7–6^{(8–6)}, 6–2
Win	2010	US Open	Hard	(Kazakhstan) Yaroslava Shvedova	(United States) Liezel Huber; (Russia) Nadia Petrova	2–6, 6–4, 7–6^{(7–4)}
Loss	2011	US Open (2)	Hard	(Kazakhstan) Yaroslava Shvedova	(United States) Liezel Huber (United States) Lisa Raymond	6–4, 6–7^{(5–7)}, 6–7^{(3–7)}

==== Mixed doubles: 1 (runner-up) ====
Result	Year	Championship	Surface	Partner	Opponents	Score
Loss	2009	French Open	Clay	(Brazil) Marcelo Melo	(United States) Bob Bryan; (United States) Liezel Huber	7–5, 6–7^{(5–7)}, [7–10]

=== WTA 1000 finals ===
==== Doubles: 4 (2 titles, 2 runner-ups) ====
Result	Year	Tournament	Surface	Partner	Opponents	Score
Loss	2007	Pan Pacific Open, Japan	Hard	(Australia) Rennae Stubbs	(United States) Lisa Raymond (Australia) Samantha Stosur	6–7^{(6–8)}, 6–3, 5–7
Win	2008	Pan Pacific Open, Japan	Hard	(Russia) Nadia Petrova	(United States) Lisa Raymond (Australia) Samantha Stosur	6–1, 6–4
Loss	2011	Italian Open	Clay	(Kazakhstan) Yaroslava Shvedova	(China) Peng Shuai (China) Zheng Jie	2–6, 3–6
Win	2011	Cincinnati Open, US	Hard	(Kazakhstan) Yaroslava Shvedova	(South Africa) Natalie Grandin (Czech Republic) Vladimíra Uhlířová	6–4, 3–6, [11–9]

== WTA career finals ==
=== Singles: 3 (1 title, 2 runner-ups) ===
Legend Grand Slam WTA 1000 WTA 500 WTA 250 (1–2)	Finals by surface Hard (1–2) Grass (0–0) Clay (0–0) Carpet (0–0)

Result	W–L	Date	Tournament	Tier	Surface	Opponent	Score
Win	1–0	Oct 2006	Bangkok Open, Thailand	Tier III	Hard	(Thailand) Tamarine Tanasugarn	2–6, 6–4, 6–4
Loss	1–1	Sep 2013	Guangzhou Open, China	International	Hard	(China) Zhang Shuai	6–7^{(1)}, 1–6
Loss	1–2	Aug 2016	Jiangxi Open, China	International	Hard	(China) Duan Yingying	6–1, 4–6, 2–6

=== Doubles: 33 (15 titles, 18 runner-ups) ===
Legend Grand Slam (2–1) WTA 1000 (2–2) Premier (1–4) International (10–11)	Finals by surface Hard (12–13) Grass (1–2) Clay (2–3) Carpet (0–0)

Result	W–L	Date	Tournament	Tier	Surface	Partner	Opponents	Score
Loss	0–1	Oct 2006	Guangzhou Open, China	Tier III	Hard	(Croatia) Jelena Kostanić Tošić	(China) Li Ting; (China) Sun Tiantian	4–6, 6–2, 5–7
Win	1–1	Oct 2006	Japan Open	Tier III	Hard	(Croatia) Jelena Kostanić Tošić	(Chinese Taipei) Chan Yung-jan; (Chinese Taipei) Chuang Chia-jung	7–6^{(2)}, 5–7, 6–2
Win	2–1	Oct 2006	Bangkok Open, Thailand	Tier III	Hard	(Croatia) Jelena Kostanić Tošić	(Argentina) Mariana Díaz Oliva; (South Africa) Natalie Grandin	7–5, 2–6, 7–5
Loss	2–2	Feb 2007	Pan Pacific Open, Japan	Tier I	Hard	(Australia) Rennae Stubbs	(United States) Lisa Raymond; (Australia) Samantha Stosur	6–7^{(6)}, 6–3, 5–7
Win	3–2	May 2007	Morocco Open	Tier IV	Clay	(India) Sania Mirza	(Romania) Andreea Ehritt-Vanc; (Russia) Anastasia Rodionova	6–1, 6–2
Win	4–2	Sep 2007	Sunfeast Open, India	Tier III	Hard	(Russia) Alla Kudryavtseva	(Italy) Alberta Brianti; (Ukraine) Mariya Koryttseva	6–1, 6–4
Loss	4–3	Oct 2007	Guangzhou Open, China	Tier III	Hard	(China) Sun Tiantian	(China) Peng Shuai; (China) Yan Zi	3–6, 4–6
Loss	4–4	Oct 2007	Japan Open	Tier III	Hard	(Chinese Taipei) Chuang Chia-jung	(China) Sun Tiantian (China) Yan Zi	6–1, 2–6 [6–10]
Loss	4–5	Feb 2008	Pattaya Open, Thailand	Tier IV	Hard	(Chinese Taipei) Hsieh Su-wei	(Chinese Taipei) Chan Yung-jan (Chinese Taipei) Chuang Chia-jung	4–6, 3–6
Win	5–5	Sep 2008	Pan Pacific Open, Japan	Tier I	Hard	(Russia) Nadia Petrova	(United States) Lisa Raymond (Australia) Samantha Stosur	6–1, 6–4
Win	6–5	Nov 2008	Tournoi de Québec, Canada	Tier III	Hard	(Germany) Anna-Lena Grönefeld	(United States) Jill Craybas; (Thailand) Tamarine Tanasugarn	7–6^{(3)}, 6–4
Win	7–5	Jan 2009	Brisbane International, Australia	International	Hard	(Germany) Anna-Lena Grönefeld	(Poland) Klaudia Jans; (Poland) Alicja Rosolska	3–6, 7–5, [10–5]
Win	8–5	Sep 2009	Tournoi de Québec, Canada (2)	International	Hard	(Czech Republic) Barbora Záhlavová-Strýcová	(Sweden) Sofia Arvidsson; (France) Séverine Beltrame	6–1, 6–3
Win	9–5	Feb 2010	National Indoors, U.S.	International	Hard	(Netherlands) Michaëlla Krajicek	(United States) Bethanie Mattek-Sands; (United States) Meghann Shaughnessy	7–5, 6–2
Loss	9–6	Mar 2010	Monterrey Open, Mexico	International	Hard	(Germany) Anna-Lena Grönefeld	(Czech Republic) Iveta Benešová (Czech Republic) Barbora Záhlavová-Strýcová	6–3, 4–6, [8–10]
Loss	9–7	Apr 2010	Charleston Open, U.S.	Premier	Clay	(Netherlands) Michaëlla Krajicek	(United States) Liezel Huber (Russia) Nadia Petrova	3–6, 4–6
Win	10–7	May 2010	Internationaux de Strasbourg, France	International	Clay	(France) Alizé Cornet	(Russia) Alla Kudryavtseva (Australia) Anastasia Rodionova	3–6, 6–4, [10–7]
Loss	10–8	Jun 2010	Rosmalen Open, Netherlands	International	Grass	(Kazakhstan) Yaroslava Shvedova	(Russia) Alla Kudryavtseva (Australia) Anastasia Rodionova	6–3, 3–6, [6–10]
Win	11–8	Jul 2010	Wimbledon, UK	Grand Slam	Grass	(Kazakhstan) Yaroslava Shvedova	(Russia) Elena Vesnina; (Russia) Vera Zvonareva	7–6^{(6)}, 6–2
Win	12–8	Sep 2010	US Open	Grand Slam	Hard	(Kazakhstan) Yaroslava Shvedova	(United States) Liezel Huber (Russia) Nadia Petrova	2–6, 6–4, 7–6^{(4)}
Loss	12–9	Mar 2011	Monterrey Open, Mexico	International	Hard	(Germany) Anna-Lena Grönefeld	(Czech Republic) Iveta Benešová (Czech Republic) Barbora Záhlavová-Strýcová	7–6^{(8)}, 2–6, [6–10]
Loss	12–10	May 2011	Italian Open	Premier 5	Clay	(Kazakhstan) Yaroslava Shvedova	(China) Peng Shuai (China) Zheng Jie	2–6, 3–6
Win	13–10	Aug 2011	Cincinnati Open, U.S.	Premier 5	Hard	(Kazakhstan) Yaroslava Shvedova	(South Africa) Natalie Grandin (Czech Republic) Vladimíra Uhlířová	6–4, 3–6, [11–9]
Loss	13–11	Sep 2011	US Open	Grand Slam	Hard	(Kazakhstan) Yaroslava Shvedova	(United States) Liezel Huber (United States) Lisa Raymond	6–4, 6–7^{(5)}, 6–7^{(3)}
Loss	13–12	Oct 2011	Japan Women's Open	International	Hard	(Kazakhstan) Yaroslava Shvedova	(Japan) Kimiko Date-Krumm; (China) Zhang Shuai	5–7, 6–3, [9–11]
Win	14–12	Oct 2011	Kremlin Cup, Russia	Premier	Hard (i)	(Kazakhstan) Yaroslava Shvedova	(Australia) Anastasia Rodionova (Kazakhstan) Galina Voskoboeva	7–6^{(3)}, 6–3
Loss	14–13	Jul 2012	Silicon Valley Classic, U.S.	Premier	Hard	(Australia) Jarmila Gajdošová	(New Zealand) Marina Erakovic; (United Kingdom) Heather Watson	5–7, 6–7^{(7)}
Loss	14–14	Jul 2012	Southern California Open, U.S.	Premier	Hard	(Russia) Nadia Petrova	(United States) Raquel Kops-Jones; (United States) Abigail Spears	2–6, 4–6
Loss	14–15	Sep 2012	Korea Open, South Korea	International	Hard	(Uzbekistan) Akgul Amanmuradova	(United States) Raquel Kops-Jones (United States) Abigail Spears	6–2, 2–6, [8–10]
Loss	14–16	Sep 2013	Guangzhou Open, China	International	Hard	(Kazakhstan) Galina Voskoboeva	(Chinese Taipei) Hsieh Su-wei (China) Peng Shuai	3–6, 6–4, [10–12]
Loss	14–17	Apr 2014	Copa Colsanitas, Colombia	International	Clay	(South Africa) Chanelle Scheepers	(Spain) Lara Arruabarrena; (France) Caroline Garcia	6–7^{(5)}, 4–6
Win	15–17	Jan 2016	Shenzhen Open, China	International	Hard	(Romania) Monica Niculescu	(China) Xu Yifan; (China) Zheng Saisai	6–1, 6–4
Loss	15–18	Jun 2016	Birmingham Classic, UK	Premier	Grass	(Russia) Alla Kudryavtseva	(Czech Republic) Karolína Plíšková (Czech Republic) Barbora Strýcová	3–6, 6–7^{(1)}

== WTA 125 tournament finals ==
=== Doubles: 1 (runner-up) ===
Result	W–L	Date	Tournament	Surface	Partner	Opponents	Score
Loss	0–1	Mar 2018	Indian Wells Challenger, United States	Hard	(United States) Jennifer Brady	(United States) Taylor Townsend (Belgium) Yanina Wickmayer	4–6, 4–6

== ITF Circuit finals ==
=== Singles: 2 (runner–ups) ===
Legend $100,000 tournaments $75,000 tournaments $50,000 tournaments $25,000 tournaments $10,000 tournaments	Finals by surface Hard (0–2) Clay (0–0) Grass (0–0) Carpet (0–0)

Result	W–L	Date	Tournament	Tier	Surface	Opponent	Score
Loss	0–1	Nov 2005	ITF Tucson, United States	75,000	Hard	(Ukraine) Yuliana Fedak	5–7, 0–6
Loss	0–2	Feb 2016	ITF Rancho Santa Fe, United States	25,000	Hard	(China) Zhang Shuai	6–1, 5–7, 4–6

=== Doubles: 8 (7 titles, 1 runner–up) ===
Legend $100,000 tournaments $80,000 tournaments $50/$60,000 tournaments $25,000 tournaments $10,000 tournaments	Finals by surface Hard (6–1) Clay (1–0) Grass (0–0) Carpet (0–0)

Result	W–L	Date	Tournament	Tier	Surface	Partner	Opponents	Score
Win	1–0	Jun 2004	ITF Fort Worth, United States	10,000	Hard	(United States) Anne Mall	(United States) Neha Uberoi (United States) Shikha Uberoi	2–6, 6–3, 7–5^{(5)}
Loss	1–1	Jul 2004	ITF Evansville, United States	10,000	Hard	(Egypt) Heidi El Tabakh	(United States) Kelly Schmandt (United States) Aleke Tsoubanos	4–6, 4–6
Win	2–1	Aug 2009	Bronx Open, United States	100,000+H	Hard	(Germany) Anna-Lena Grönefeld	(France) Julie Coin (Canada) Marie-Ève Pelletier	6–0, 6–2
Win	3–1	May 2013	Open de Cagnes-sur-Mer, France	100,000	Clay	(Netherlands) Arantxa Rus	(Colombia) Catalina Castaño (Brazil) Teliana Pereira	4–6, 7–5, [10–8]
Win	4–1	Nov 2015	Waco Showdown, United States	50,000	Hard	(United States) Nicole Gibbs	(Israel) Julia Glushko (Sweden) Rebecca Peterson	6–4, 6–4
Win	5–1	Feb 2018	Burnie International, Australia	60,000	Hard	(United Kingdom) Laura Robson	(Japan) Momoko Kobori (Japan) Chihiro Muramatsu	7–6^{(3)}, 6–1
Win	6–1	Aug 2019	ITF Landisville, United States	60,000	Hard	(United States) Claire Liu	(United States) Hayley Carter (United States) Jamie Loeb	4–6, 6–2, [10–5]
Win	7–1	Mar 2021	ITF Newport Beach, United States	25,000	Hard	(United States) Maegan Manasse	(United States) Emina Bektas (United Kingdom) Tara Moore	6–4, 6–2

== Junior Grand Slam finals ==
=== Doubles: 1 (runner-up) ===
Result	Year	Tournament	Surface	Partner	Opponents	Score
Loss	2005	US Open	Hard	(United States) Alexa Glatch	(Czech Republic) Nikola Fraňková (Russia) Alisa Kleybanova	5–7, 6–7^{(3)}
